= John FitzGerald of Dromana =

Irish magnate (died 1662 or 1664)

Sir John FitzGerald of Dromana
- Lord of the Decies
- Tenure: 1643–1664
- Predecessor: Gerald FitzGerald of Dromana
- Born: c. 1635
- Died: 1662 or 1664
- Spouses: 1. Katherine Power; 2. Helen MacCarthy
- Issue Detail: Katherine, Vicountess Grandison
- Father: Gerald FitzGerald of Dromana
- Mother: Mabel Digby

Sir John FitzGerald of Dromana (c. 1635 – 1662 or 1664) was the last of the FitzGeralds of Dromana. He sat as MP for Dungarvan in the Irish Parliament of 1661–1666.

== Birth and origins ==
Family tree

John FitzGerald with his two wives, his parents, and other selected relatives. (Note: This family tree is based on genealogies of the FitzGeralds of Dromana and the Powers of Curraghmore.)

John Oge; Power d.v.p.*	John Oge; FitzGerald of Dromana d. 1626	Robert; Digby; 1574–1618 courtier	Lettice; Baroness; Offaly; 1580–1658
John; Power; 5th Baron; Curraghmore c. 1599 – 1661	Gerald; FitzGerald of Dromana; 1610–1643	Mabel; Digby	Donough; 1st Earl; 1594–1665
Richard; Power; 1st Earl; Tyrone; 1630–1690	Katherine; Power d. 1660	John; FitzGerald of Dromana d. 1664	Helen d. 1722	George; 4th Viscount; Grandison c. 1617 – 1699
John Power, 2nd Earl of Tyrone d. 1693	Katherine; 1660–1725	Edward; Villiers c. 1654 – 1693 d.v.p.*
John; Villiers; 1st Earl; 1684–1766

Legend

XXX	Subject of the article	XXX	Power of Curraghmore	XXX	Earls of Clancarty	XXX	Viscounts & Earls of Grandison
XXX	Baron; Offaly

*d.v.p. = predeceased his father (decessit vita patris)

John was born about 1635 probably at Dromana, the only son of Gerald FitzGerald and his wife Mabel Digby. His father was esquire of Dromana and styled Lord of the Decies. His family was a cadet branch of the FitzGerald of Desmond, an Irish Old English family. The Dromana branch started when Gerald FitzGerald, the second son of James FitzGerald, 6th Earl of Desmond (died 1462) was given Dromana as appanage.

His mother was the second daughter of Sir Robert Digby and his wife Lettice Digby, 1st Baroness Offaly. Her family was English and Protestant.

== Irish Wars ==
His father was a protestant like his wife and sided with the government during the Irish Rebellion of 1641 and the ensuing Irish Confederate Wars. He died in 1643 in his early thirties, probably killed in action while fighting the Confederates. Dromana castle had been lost to the insurgents in 1642 or 1643 when his mother surrendered the castle to them. Murrough O'Brien, 6th Baron Inchiquin retook the castle in April 1647.

== First marriage and child ==
FitzGerald married first in 1658 Katharine, daughter of John Power, 5th Baron Curraghmore and sister of Richard Power, 1st Earl of Tyrone.

John and Katherine had an only daughter:

- Katherine, rich heiress, who married first John Power, 2nd Earl of Tyrone, secondly Edward FitzGerald-Villiers, and thirdly William Steuart

FitzGerald's first wife died on 22 August 1660.

== Second marriage ==
FitzGerald married secondly Helen, daughter of Donough MacCarty, 1st Earl of Clancarty. The marriage was childless.

== House of Commons ==
When Charles II summoned the Irish Parliament of 1661–1666, FitzGerald stood for Dungarvan Bourough and was elected as one of its two representatives.

== Death ==
FitzGerald died in 1662 or 1664.

== Notes and references ==
=== Sources ===
- Bagwell, Richard (1895). "O'Brien, Murrough, first Earl of Inchiquin (1614–1674)". In Lee, Sidney (ed.). Dictionary of National Biography. Vol. XLI. New York: MacMillan and Co. pp. 320–327. OCLC 8544105.
- Burke, John (1838). A Genealogic and Heraldic History of the Commoners of Great Britain and Ireland, Enjoying Territorial Possessions or High Official Rank. Vol. IV. London: Henry Colburn. OCLC 13131620.
- Burke, Bernard (1866). A Genealogical History of the Dormant, Abeyant, Forfeited and Extinct Peerages of the British Empire (New ed.). London: Harrison. OCLC 11501348.
- Burke, Bernard; Burke, Ashworth Peter (1909). A Genealogical and Heraldic History of the Peerage and Baronetage, the Privy Council, Knightage and Companionage (71st ed.). London: Harrison. OCLC 28297274.
- Cokayne, George Edward (1895). Complete Peerage of England, Scotland, Ireland, Great Britain and the United Kingdom, Extant, Extinct, or Dormant. Vol. VI (1st ed.). London: George Bell and Sons. OCLC 1180818801. – N to R (for Power)
- Fuller, James F. (1904). "The Heiress of Dromana, Two Hundred Years ago" (PDF). Journal of the Cork Historical and Archaeological Society. 2. 10 (61): 10–18.
- House of Commons (1878). Return. Members of Parliament – Part II. Parliaments of Great Britain, 1705–1796. Parliaments of the United Kingdom, 1801–1874. Parliaments and Conventions of the Estates of Scotland, 1357–1707. Parliaments of Ireland, 1599–1800. London: His/Her Majesty's Stationery Office. OCLC 13112546.
- Mackenzie, Thérèse Muir (1907). Dromana: the Memoirs of an Irish Family. Dublin: Sealy, Bryers, and Walker. OCLC 1156362488.

Parliament of Ireland
Preceded by Sir Richard Osborne, 2nd Baronet; John Hore	Member of Parliament for Dungarvan Borough; 1661–1666; With: Sir Allan Broderick	Succeeded by John Hore; Martin Hore
