= Theaker Wilder =

Irish academic (1717–1778)

Theaker Wilder (1717–1778) was an Anglo-Irish academic with expertise in mathematics and Greek. He was the first Regius Professor of Greek, Senior Register and Senior Fellow at Trinity College Dublin. He is remembered for being Oliver Goldsmith's 'learned savage' of a tutor.

== Family ==
Born in 1717 at Castle Wilder, Abbeyshrule, County Longford, Wilder was the youngest son of Mathew Wilder (d.1719) of Castle Wilder, High Sheriff of Longford, and Eleanor Steuart (d.1729), co-heiress of her uncle General Sir William Steuart. His mother was a daughter of Captain James Steuart (d.1689), but after his death at the Siege of Derry, she and her brothers and sisters were brought up by their father's younger brother, General Steuart and his first wife, Katherine FitzGerald, Viscountess Grandison. Theaker Wilder's uncles included Admiral James Steuart M.P., Admiral of the Fleet; Charles Steaurt (d.1740) of Bailieborough Castle, County Cavan; and Brigadier-General The Hon. William Steuart (d.1737) M.P., of Ballylane, County Waterford, who through his marriage to his uncle's stepdaughter, Mary FitzGerald-Villiers, came to be the uncle of Prime Minister William Pitt, 1st Earl of Chatham.

== Education ==
Wilder was tutored at home by Dr. Elwood before entering Trinity College Dublin as a pensioner (ordinary student) on 8 July 1734. He became a Scholar in 1736, earned a BA degree in 1738, got an M.A. in 1741, and became a Fellow in 1744. He also received a BD in 1748 and a D.D. in 1753. He was appointed Donegall Lecturer in Mathematics at TCD in 1759 and the first Regius Professor of Greek in 1761. He was succeeded in this latter post by John Stokes in 1760 and 1764, respectively.

Academics at Trinity College led an affluent life. According to Thomas D'Arcy McGee in his book A Popular History of Ireland: from the Earliest Period to the Emancipation of the Catholics:

The Established Church continued, of course, to monopolise University honours, and to enjoy its princely revenues and all political advantages. Trinity College continued annually to farm its 200,000 acres at a rental averaging 100,000 pounds sterling. Its wealth, and the uses to which it is put, are thus described by a recent writer:

"Some of Trinity's senior fellows enjoy higher incomes than Cabinet ministers; many of her tutors have revenues above those of cardinals; and junior fellows, of a few days' standing, frequently decline some of her thirty-one church livings with benefices which would shame the poverty of scores of continental, not to say Irish, Catholic archbishops. Even eminent judges hold her professorships; some of her chairs are vacated for the

Episcopal bench only; and majors and field officers would acquire increased pay by being promoted to the rank of head porter, first menial, in Trinity College. Apart from her princely fellowships and professorships, her seventy Foundation, and sixteen non-Foundation Scholarships, her thirty Sizarships, and her fourteen valuable Studentships, she has at her disposal an aggregate, by bequests, benefactions, and various endowments, of 117 permanent exhibitions, amounting to upwards of 2,000 pounds per annum".

Wilder was fairly eccentric, as described in Ireland 120 Years Ago (1851) by John Edward Walsh:

The gownsmen were then a formidable body, and, from a strong esprit de corps, were ready, on short notice, to issue forth in a mass to avenge any insult offered to an individual of their party who complained of it. They converted the keys of their rooms into formidable weapons. They procured them as large and heavy as possible, and slinging them in the sleeves or tails of their gowns, or pocket-handkerchiefs, gave with them mortal blows. Even the fellows participated in this esprit de corps. The interior of the college was considered a sanctuary for debtors; and woe to the unfortunate bailiff who violated its precincts. There stood, at that time, a wooden pump in the centre of the front court to which delinquents in this way were dragged the moment they were detected, and all but smothered. One of the then fellows, Dr. Wilder, [Rev. Theaker Wilder, a good mathematical scholar, was tutor to Oliver Goldsmith. He was elected Fellow in 1744; and died in 1777] was a man of very eccentric habits, and possessed little of the gravity and decorum that distinguish the exemplary fellows of Trinity at the present day. He once met a young lady in one of the crossings, where she could not pass him without walking in the mud He stopped opposite her; and, gazing for a moment on her face, he laid his hands on each side and kissed her. He then nodded familiarly at the astonished and offended girl and saying, "Take that, miss, for being so handsome" stepped out of the way and let her pass. He was going through the college courts on one occasion when a bailiff was under discipline; he pretended to interfere for the man and called out – "Gentlemen, gentlemen, for the love of God, don't be so cruel as to nail his ears to the pump." The hint was immediately taken; a hammer and nail were sent for, and an ear was fastened with a tenpenny nail; the lads dispersed, and the wretched man remained for a considerable time bleeding, and shrieking with pain, before he was released.

== Tutor to Goldsmith ==
Wilder was appointed tutor to the young Oliver Goldsmith when Goldsmith entered Trinity College as a Sizar in 1744. Because both men were from the same locality, it was thought that Wilder would provide wise counsel to Goldsmith. However, according to Irving and others, the relationship was tempestuous. There were several incidents where Goldsmith was disciplined by Wilder for infractions of the college rules, culminating in his running away to Cork (en route to the Colonies). When he had spent all his money, wiser heads prevailed and, with Goldsmith's brother Henry acting as peacemaker, he was able to return to his academic studies. He was awarded a B.A. degree in February 1749, two years later than normal.

Some extracts from Goldsmith's biographies:

From John Gibson Lockhart –

He was, moreover, unfortunate in having for his tutor a Mr. Wilder, noted for savage temper, who had the ungenerosity to treat students of the subordinate class with peculiar harshness. Wilder might, perhaps, have treated Oliver better, had his turn been for mathematics and the scholastic logic, in which alone he himself excelled and delighted: but Oliver never concealed his dislike of these studies, and for his proficiency, to whatever it may have amounted, in the ancient languages and their elegant literature, the tutor cared little or nothing ... The youthful sizar was a poet, and we need not doubt that his passions at this period fermented with sufficient commotion. His father died before he had been two years in college, and from that time, though he received occasional supplies from his uncle Contarine, according to the statement of a companion, "his poverty was generally squalid." ...

The registers of Trinity furnish evidence of many irregularities; and among the rest Goldsmith figures as aiding and abetting a riot of May 1747, which began with pumping a bailiff at the college cistern — and ended with the students heading the rabble of the town in an attempt to force Newgate and liberate the prisoners. This frolic was a very serious one — the gaoler fired, and three were killed and several wounded. Five of the gowned ringleaders were expelled, and Goldsmith and four others were ordered to be admonished "Quod seditioni favissent et tumultuantibus opem tulissent."

In the month after this, Oliver, anxious to recover his ground, made a considerable exertion, stood for one of Erasmus Smith's exhibitions, for which, though then producing only thirty shillings a-year, there were numerous competitors, and acquitted himself at the examination so well as to attain his object. Elated with this first and last of his academical distinctions, he invited a party of young people of both sexes to a supper and dance in his chambers. Mr. Wilder, astounded with the noise of the unlawful fiddle, entered the room, expostulated warmly with Goldsmith, and probably receiving an intemperate answer, struck him. Upon his sensitive spirit, this unwarrantable violence produced a violent effect. After brooding all night over his disgrace, he sold off his books and quit the university, resolving to embark for America, and never revisit Ireland until he had made a character and fortune for himself in another region. He loitered about Dublin, however, until he had just one shilling left, and then set out for Cork. On this shilling he supported himself, by his own account, for three days, and then, having sold most of his raiment, was reduced to such extremity, that "after fasting twenty-four hours, he thought a handful of grey peas, given him by a girl at a wake, the most comfortable repast he had ever made." Fatigue and famine did what advice would probably have attempted in vain. Reaching the neighbourhood of his brother Henry, he sent him notice of his plight — was kindly received, re-clothed — and at length carried back to college, where his brother effected "a sort of reconciliation" between him and his tutor.

From Alexander Chalmers – The materials for a life of Dr. Goldsmith are very copious, although, not perhaps uniformly authentic...

In June 1744, when in his fifteenth year, he was sent to Dublin College, and entered as a sizer, under the rev. Mr. Wilder, one of the fellows, but a man of harsh temper and violent passions, and consequently extremely unfit to win the affections and guide the disposition of a youth, simple, ingenuous, thoughtless and unguarded. His pupil, however, made some progress, although slow, in academical studies. In 1747, he was elected one of the exhibitioners on the foundation of Erasmus Smyth; and in 1749, two years after the regular time, he was admitted to the degree of bachelor of arts. His indolence and irregularities may in part account for this tardy advancement to the reputation of a scholar, but much may likewise be attributed to the unfeeling neglect of his tutor, who contended only for the preservation of certain rules of discipline, while he gave himself little trouble with the cultivation of the mind. On one occasion he thought proper to chastise Oliver before a party of young friends of both sexes, whom, with his usual imprudence, he was entertaining with a supper and dance in his rooms. Oliver immediately disposed of his books and clothes, left college, and commenced a wanderer, without any prospect, without friends, and without money. At length, after suffering such extremity of hunger, that a handful of grey peas, which a girl gave him at a wake, appeared a luxurious meal, he contrived to acquaint his brother with his situation, who immediately clothed him and carried him back to college, effecting at the same time a reconciliation between him and his tutor, which it may be supposed was more convenient than cordial on either side.

From Henry Francis Cary – In June 1744, he was sent a sizer to Trinity College, Dublin, and placed under the tuition of Mr. Wilder, one of the fellows, who is represented to have been of a temper so morose as to excite the strongest disgust in the mind of his pupil. He did not pass through his academical course without distinction. Dr. Kearney (who was afterwards provost), in a note on Boswell's Life of Johnson, informs us, that Goldsmith gained a premium at the Christmas examination, which, according to Mr. Malone, is more honourable than those obtained at the other examinations, inasmuch as it is the only one that determines the successful candidate to be the first in literary merit. This is enough to disprove what Johnson is reported to have said of him, that he was a plant that flowered late; that there appeared nothing remarkable about him when he was young; though, when he had got in fame, one of his friends began to recollect something of his being distinguished at college. Whether he took a degree is not known. On one occasion he narrowly escaped expulsion for having been concerned in the rescue of a student, who, in violation of the supposed privileges of the University, had been arrested for debt within its precincts: but his superiors contented themselves with passing a public censure on him.

From Sir Walter Scott – An uncle by affinity, the Rev. Thomas Contarine, undertook the expense of affording to so promising a youth the advantages of a scholastic education. He was put to school at Edgeworths-town, and, in June 1744, was sent to Dublin College as a sizer; a situation which subjected him to much discouragement and ill usage, especially as he had the misfortune to fall under the charge of a brutal tutor.

On 15th June 1747, Goldsmith obtained his only academical laurel, being an Exhibition on the foundation of Erasmus Smythe, Esq. Some indiscreet frolic induced him soon afterwards to quit the University for a period; and he appears thus early to have commenced that sort of idle strolling life, which has often great charms for youths of genius, because it frees them from every species of subjection, and leaves them full masters of their own time, and their own thoughts; a liberty which they do not feel too dearly bought, at the expense of fatigue, of hunger, and of all the other inconveniences incidental to those who travel without money. Those who can recollect journeys of this kind, with all the shifts, necessities, and petty adventures, which attend them, will not wonder at the attractions which they had for such a youth as Goldsmith. Notwithstanding these erratic expeditions, he was admitted Bachelor of Arts in 1749.

From Thomas Campbell – He was admitted a sizer or servitor of Trinity college, Dublin, in his sixteenth year, [11th June, 1745] a circumstance which denoted considerable proficiency; and three years afterwards was elected one of the exhibitioners on the foundation of Erasmus Smith. But though he occasionally distinguished himself by his translations from the classics, his general appearance at the university corresponded neither with the former promises, nor future development of his talents. He was, like Johnson, a lounger at the college-gate. He gained neither premiums nor a scholarship, and was not admitted to the degree of bachelor of arts till two years after the regular time. His backwardness, it would appear, was the effect of despair more than of wilful negligence. He had been placed under a savage tutor, named Theaker Wilder, who used to insult him at public examinations, and to treat his delinquencies with a ferocity that broke his spirit. On one occasion, poor Oliver was so imprudent as to invite a company of young people, of both sexes, to a dance and supper in his rooms; on receiving intelligence of which, Theaker grimly repaired to the place of revelry, belaboured him before his guests, and rudely broke up the assembly. The disgrace of this inhuman treatment drove him for a time from the university. He set out from Dublin, intending to sail from Cork for some other country, he knew not whither; but, after wandering about till he was reduced to such famine, that he thought a handful of grey peas, which a girl gave him at a wake, the sweetest repast he had ever tasted, he returned home, like the prodigal son, and matters were adjusted for his being received again at college.

== Examiner of Edmund Burke ==
There is also a record of Wilder's contacts with Goldsmith's contemporary, Edmund Burke. Wilder examined Burke in 1745. It seems that Burke did not relish the experience, and took a dim view of Wilder.

== Marriage and family ==
In about 1746, Wilder married Letitia Grove (b.c.1724) of Castle Shanahan, County Donegal. In 1771, after the death of his brother, Steuart Wilder, he inherited Lisdornan, County Meath, which had previously belonged to their mother's uncle, General Sir William Steuart. Theaker continued to reside at Grovehall, Ramelton, gifted to him by his wife's kinsman James Grove, High Sheriff of Donegal. Three of their children (Henry, Oliver, and Nancy) died unmarried. They were survived by two sons:

- Mathew Wilder (d.1792) inherited Castle Wilder from his uncle Steuart Wilder and served as High Sheriff of Longford. In 1772, he married Eleanor, sister of Lt.-General Sir Hugh Lyle Carmichael. Their son, Mathew Carlisle Wilder (1775–1809), left Castle Wilder to his son-in-law, Captain Hugh Pollock, who sold it in 1845.
- James Wilder (1764–1788) married Sarah Drought (1764–1788), the eldest daughter of his first cousin James Drought (1738–1820), and sister of Mrs Richard Graves. James Drought's mother, Sarah (Wilder) Drought, was Theaker's sister.

Theaker and Letitia Wilder were the grandparents of Letitia Denniston (otherwise Coll, 1775–1863) of Cocksheath, Carrigart, County Donegal.

== Later life and death ==
Wilder became rector of Tullyaughnish (Ramelton, County Donegal) in 1769 and died in late 1777 or, most likely, January 1778, at his home, Grovehall (a townland between Ramelton and Kilmacrennan—not Castle Grove near Letterkenny). The living of Tullyaughnish was in the patronage of the Provost and Fellows of Trinity College Dublin at that time.

His death was reported in the first issue of the Dublin Evening Journal and a few days later in The Londonderry Journal. According to one account—"It is interesting to know that Mr. Theaker Wilder was killed in a drunken riot, just at the time when Goldsmith's social success was at its height"—but this cannot be true since Goldsmith had already been dead for almost four years by the time Wilder died. Another source ascribes his death to an accident sustained when arriving home late from a local hostelry. In any event, his widow took steps to secure his assets. Advertisements to this effect appeared in The Londonderry Journal for several weeks after his death.

== Publications ==
Wilder published an edition of Newton's Universal arithmetick, to which he contributed notes. The book was published in London in 1769. It was begun by Wilder's colleague in Trinity College, Dublin, James Maguire, but was unfinished at the time of Maguire's death. The enterprise was undertaken by Wilder at the behest of Maguire's family–

... John and Bridget, the Brother and Sister

of the Author James Maguire: And to the Use of his Representatives, the Profits (if any) of this Work are by Deed conveyed; the Losses, if any, are to be sustained solely by me.
