= George Hogg (priest) =

George Smith Hogg (born 20 April 1910, date of death unknown) was Archdeacon of Cashel and Emly from 1965 to 1980.

He was born in Ballacolla, educated at Trinity College, Dublin and ordained in 1934. His first post was as Curate of Crossduff. He was Curate in charge at Sallaghy then Rector of Clonoulty. After this he was the Incumbent at Tipperary from 1947 to 1980; Canon and Chancellor of Cashel Cathedral from 1960 to 1965; and Rural Dean of Tipperary from 1961 to 1980.

Church of Ireland titles
Preceded by George McKinley	Archdeacon of Cashel and Emly; 1965–1980	Succeeded by Gerald Mark David Woodworth & Hugh Henry James Gray (Archdeaconries re-organised)
