= George White (archdeacon) =

Irish Anglican cleric

George Purcell White (died 1929) was Archdeacon of Cashel from 1922 and of Emly from 1928; after which the Archdeaconries merged.

He was educated at Trinity College, Dublin and ordained in 1895. His first post was as Curate of St Mark, Cork. He was Rector of Templemore from 1903; and Prebendary of Fennor in Cashel Cathedral from 1912; .

His father was Dean of Cashel from 1890 to 1908.

Church of Ireland titles
Preceded by Denis Hanan (Cashel); Robert Cleary (Emly)	Archdeacon of Cashel and Emly; 1922–1929	Succeeded by St. John Drelincourt Seymour (Archdeaconries merged)
