= Hugh Gray =

Hugh Gray may refer to:

- Hugh Gray (theologian) (before 1550–1604), English churchman and academic
- Hugh Gray (politician) (1916–2002), English Labour Party MP and University of London lecturer
- Hugh Gray (priest) (1921–c. 2003), Irish archdeacon of Ossory and Leighlin from 1983 to 1992
