= Arthur Leech =

Irish clergyman

Arthur Henry Leech, FSIA (23 March 1817 – 10 May 1890) was an Irish clergyman and Dean of Cashel from 1878 to 1890.

He was born in Dublin, the fifth son of civil servant William Ansdell Leech, an inspector with H.M. Customs in Ireland, and Mary Atkinson. He was educated at Trinity College, Dublin, receiving his BA in 1840 and MA and in 1869. He was a fellow of the Royal Society of Antiquaries of Ireland. He was a clergyman in the diocese for more than 50 years when he died at the deanery, aged 73.

He married Ellen Wilson, daughter of Thomas Maunsell Wilson and the Hon. Isabella Monck and granddaughter of Charles Monck, 1st Viscount Monck. They had one who died in infancy and five daughters.

== Arms ==
Coat of arms of Arthur Leech
Notes Confirmed 30 October 1860 by Sir John Berard Burke, Ulster King of Arms. Crest Out of a ducal coronet Or charged with a trefoil Vert an arm erect Proper grasping a snake environed about the arm also Vert. Escutcheon Ermine a trefoil Vert on a chief indented Gules three ducal coronets Or. Motto Virtute Et Valore

Church of Ireland titles
Preceded by William Pakenham Walsh	Dean of Cashel; 1878–1890	Succeeded by George Purcell White
