= Ambrose Forth =

English-born civilian lawyer

Sir Ambrose Forth (c.1545–1610) was an English-born civilian lawyer whose career was spent in Ireland, where he became the Irish Probate judge and later the first judge of the Irish Court of Admiralty. He has been praised as a diligent, conscientious and honest Crown official. At the same time, he devoted much effort to acquiring a large landed estate.

== Early career ==
He was born in London: little seems to be known about his parents. He was a younger brother of Robert Forth, a leading admiralty lawyer who often acted as Deputy to the English Admiralty judge, David Lewis, in the 1560s and 70s, and probably helped to further his brother's career. Ambrose was educated at Eton College and the University of Cambridge, and became a fellow of Jesus College, Cambridge.

In 1573 he moved to Ireland and built up a lucrative practice in the field of civil law. He became a Master of the Court of Chancery (Ireland) and judge of the Irish Prerogative court, which dealt with probate cases. Much to his own disappointment, he was passed over for the office of Master of the Rolls in Ireland, although he enjoyed the regard of Archbishop Adam Loftus, Lord Chancellor of Ireland, the most powerful man in the Irish administration for some 30 years. He also enjoyed the support of several of the leading English statesmen of the time, and visited London every year or two to consult them.

Ambrose, who was inclined to grumble, portrayed himself as a poverty-stricken man who had suffered financially due to his integrity. He complained about his supposedly meagre salary, which he said allowed him to live only in a "poor farmhouse" in Cabra: this was apparently Cabra Castle near Kingscourt in County Cavan, in which case the description "poor farmhouse" is grossly misleading. The original Cabra Castle is now a ruin: the present building is nineteenth-century. He petitioned repeatedly for further grants of land, and was reputed to dispense bribes to those who might assist him in acquiring further lands, although he vehemently denied any suggestion of corruption. In fact he seems to have been well-rewarded for his official duties: in 1591 he received grants of lands at Trevet, near Dunshaughlin, and at Kells, Clongorman, Ballinagrange and Ballinaclaye in County Meath. He made an advantageous marriage into the leading Anglo-Irish Cusack family of County Meath. The family's principal estate remained at Cabra in County Cavan.

== Irish Court of Admiralty ==
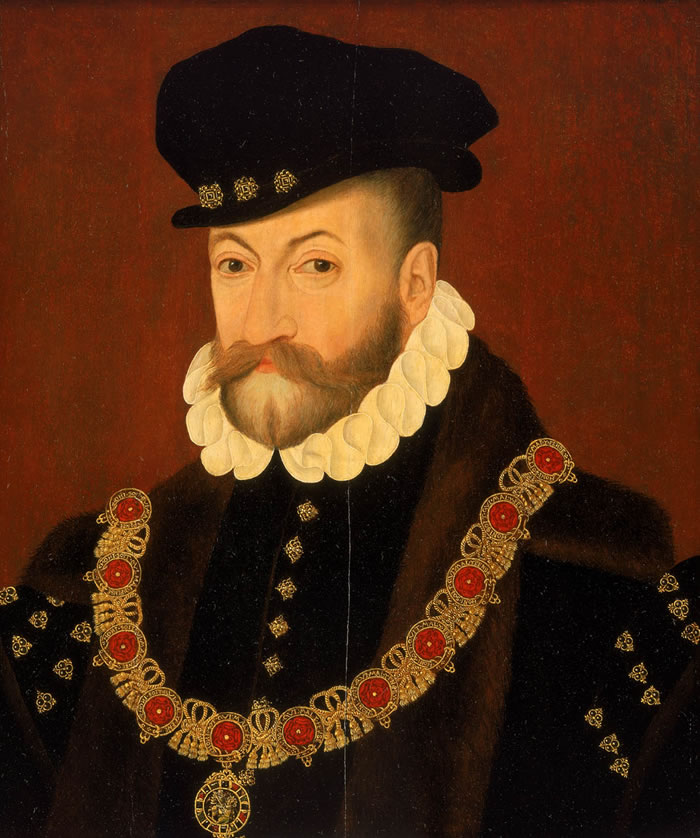
Edward, Earl of Lincoln, the Lord High Admiral, who chose Forth as the first Irish Admiralty judge

In 1575 the Lord High Admiral, Edward Clinton, 1st Earl of Lincoln, created a separate, though subordinate, Court of Admiralty in Ireland. His reason for taking this step was the lack of any Irish Court which could try cases of piracy, or deal with the disposition of prize ships. Forth, given his own and his brother's knowledge of civil law (which encompassed admiralty law), and enjoying the respect of several leading English statesmen, was an obvious choice to be the first judge of the new Court, and proved to be a good one. He was a conscientious and hard-working official, travelling regularly to Munster and Connacht in the course of his duties, and setting up a subsidiary Court of Admiralty in Munster.

Piracy was an endemic problem in Ireland, and Forth was naturally troubled by it. Although he had been appointed the Admiralty judge largely to deal with the problem, he apparently thought that his powers were inadequate. In 1586 he wrote to his English counterpart, Sir Julius Caesar, describing the problem of pirates "in several towns", and pleading for a special commission to be set up to try Irish pirates.

He clashed with the municipal corporations, many of whom insisted that they had a separate admiralty jurisdiction, and with the Lord Deputy of Ireland, Sir John Perrot, whom he evidently believed supported the corporations on the point; the clash over jurisdiction between the Court of Admiralty and the corporations rumbled on at intervals into the 1640s.

His greatest difficulty was the preference of litigants for the longer-established English Admiralty Court; Forth complained of the insistence of litigants on getting a hearing in England even where the subject matter of the case was purely Irish. His authority was also limited by the fact that Irish litigants had a right of appeal to the English Admiralty, as the Lord High Admiral of England remained the final authority in all maritime law cases, although a local Court of Appeal for Admiralty cases sat in Ireland for a few years. He was troubled by the expenses suffered by Irish litigants who were required to appear before the English Court, and wrote to Caesar about the matter in 1591.

Notwithstanding these difficulties, it is to his credit that he did establish the Irish Admiralty court, and its subsidiary court in Munster, as permanent features of the Irish courts system. Forth was knighted in 1604, and died in 1610.

== Marriage and children ==
Forth married Anne Cusack, daughter of Edward Cusack of Lismullen and granddaughter of Sir Thomas Cusack, Lord Chancellor of Ireland. Her mother was Elizabeth Aylmer, daughter of Richard Aylmer of Donadea, County Kildare and his wife Elinor Fleming (who was a granddaughter of James Fleming, 7th Baron Slane), and sister of Sir Gerard Aylmer, 1st Baronet. After Forth's death, Anne remarried Christopher Nugent, a younger brother of Richard Nugent, 1st Earl of Westmeath. She married thirdly, before 1637, Valerian Wellesley, of the family which later produced the Duke of Wellington.

Ambrose and Anne Forth had at least four children, including:

- Sir Robert Forth MP, who sat in the Irish House of Commons for Kilbeggan 1639–49, and for Meath in the Parliament of 1661–6. He became a member of the Privy Council of Ireland in 1660, and was a close ally of James Butler, 1st Duke of Ormonde. He had at least one son John and one daughter Mary, who married as his second wife the wealthy Cromwellian settler James Stopford (1620–1685) of Newhall, County Meath, who was grandfather through his first wife of James Stopford, Bishop of Cloyne, and also ancestor of the Earl of Courtown.
- Catherine, who married Edward Nugent of Dysart, County Westmeath, with whom she had two sons.
- Margaret, who married firstly Thomas Moore of Croghan, County Offaly, MP for Philipstown in the Parliament of 1634–35, by whom she had three children, including their eldest son John, ancestor of the Earl of Charleville; and secondly Philip Digby, a younger son of Sir Robert Digby and Lettice Digby, 1st Baroness Offaly.

== Sources ==
- Ball, F. Elrington "History of Dublin" Vol.6 Dublin University Press 1920
- Bergin, John "Stopford, James" Cambridge Dictionary of National Biography
- Costello, Kevin, The Court of Admiralty of Ireland 1575–1893 Dublin Four Courts Press 2011
- D'Alton, John, "Wellesley Pedigree" Notes and Queries Issue 136, 22 January 1853
- Mosley, ed. Burke's Peerage 106th Edition Switzerland 1999
- National Library of Ireland
- Perceval-Maxwell, M. The Outbreak of the Irish Rebellion of 1641 McGill-Queen's University Press 1994
