= Philip Matthews =

Philip Matthews or Philip Mathews may refer to:

- Sir Philip Matthews, 1st Baronet (c. 1642–1685), Fellow of the Royal Society of London
- Philip Mathews (archdeacon) (fl. 1689–1740), Archdeacon of Connor in Ireland
- Phil Mathews (basketball) (born 1950), American basketball coach
- Phillip Matthews (born 1960), Ireland rugby union player

== See also ==
- Philip Bushill-Matthews (born 1943), former British politician
