= William Digby (Dean of Clonfert) =

Irish Anglican cleric

William Digby was a Church of Ireland priest in Ireland.

The grandson of Bishop Simon Digby, he was educated at Trinity College Dublin. He was Dean of Clonfert from 1766 until his death in 1812. He was appointed a Prebendary of Elphin Cathedral in 1767 and of Kildare in 1770.
