= Bolton Library =

Building in County Tipperary, Ireland

- 53.219190804434184°N 7.885437490647715°W
- Location: Cashel, County Tipperary, Ireland
- Established: 18th century CE

Collection
- Items collected: Books
- Size: ca. 12,000 items

The Bolton Library is a collection of books housed at the University of Limerick and a physical library building in Cashel, County Tipperary, Ireland. It is described as the largest and most important collection of antiquarian books in Ireland outside of Dublin.

== History ==
Church of Ireland Archbishop Theophilus Bolton established the library in the 18th century CE by combining his own collection of books with approximately 6,000 more purchased from the estate of the late Archbishop of Dublin, William King. Known as the Cashel Diocesan Library, it was originally housed in the Bishop's Palace before moving to a purpose-built chapter house designed by local architect William Tinsley on the grounds of St. John's Cathedral, Cashel. On his death, Bolton left the collection to the diocese of Cashel in perpetuity. His bequest did not include funding for the maintenance of the collection and the library struggled financially.

== Conservation ==
The collection was endangered as early as 1798, when soldiers quartered in the Bishop's Palace damaged the library and destroyed some books. In 1822, Reverend Henry Cotton was appointed librarian. Passage of the Church Temporalities Act 1833 led to the removal of the collection from the Bishop's Palace and in 1835 Cotton hired local architect William Tinsley to design a new building to house the library. In 1857, John Davis White became librarian, a post he held until the 1890s. Introduction of the Irish Church Act 1869 reduced funding for the collection, resulting in a deterioration of conditions in the building. In 1873, the library printed a Catalogue of the Library of the Dean and Chapter of Cashel, documenting the contents. In 1909, the post of librarian was dissolved and the Dean of Cashel took charge of the collection. In the early 1900s, Bolton Library made loans to other institutions, including Marsh's Library and the Church of Ireland Representative Church Body Library in Dublin. On his appointment in 1961, Dean Charles Wolfe arranged the return of loaned items and attempted to obtain funding to restore the library. Unable to find sponsors, Wolfe sold hundreds of books to the Folger Shakespeare Library in Washington, D.C. and used the money to repair the outside of the building. In 1973, a Catalogue of Cashel Diocesan Library was printed in Boston.

In the 1980s, Dean of Cashel David Woodworth began a renovation and conservation project. The building was refurbished with funding from the American Irish Foundation and the Smurfit Foundation, among others. Major support came from Guinness Peat Aviation (GPA) and in 1986 the library was renamed the GPA Bolton Library. Throughout the 1990s, the library's debts increased dramatically, leading to the sale of two valuable pieces. Attempts to fund the library through tourism failed. In 1994, under Dean Philip Knowles, the University of Limerick agreed to support the library, including managing its finances and administration. Further funding was provided by philanthropist Lewis Glucksman and much work was carried out by FÁS employees and volunteers. In 2004 a computerised catalogue was established. The Irish Heritage Council published a heritage conservation plan for the library in 2007.

From 2010, the University of Limerick took a greater role in managing the library, in conjunction with Marsh's Library and the Office of Public Works. In 2016, the collection was moved to the Glucksmann Library at the University of Limerick.

Previous board members, trustees, and patrons have included Archbishop John Neill, Founding President of the University of Limerick Edward M. Walsh, Bishop Peter Barrett, and politician Martin Mansergh.

== Collection ==
The library contains approximately 12,000 items, including books, manuscripts, maps, and prints. More than 50 items are not on record anywhere else in the world and a further 800 are unique in Ireland. The library includes books from the collections of Catherine of Aragon, Francis Bacon, and Abraham Ortelius, creator of the modern atlas. The library has been featured as part of National Heritage Week.

== See also ==
- Marsh's Library
- List of libraries in the Republic of Ireland
