= Robert Digby (courtier) =

English courtier (1574–1618)

Sir Robert Digby PC(I) (1574 – 24 May 1618) was an English courtier who owned an estate at Coleshill, Warwickshire. His marriage to Lettice FitzGerald, heir-general to the 11th Earl of Kildare, led him to spend his life litigating over her claims to the Kildare lands. He divided his time between local business in Warwickshire and in Ireland.

== Biography ==
Digby was the eldest son of George Digby, (MP) of Coleshill, and his wife, Abigail, daughter of Sir Anthony Heveningham. Robert was educated at Magdalen College, Oxford, where he took a BA, and then as a barrister at the Middle Temple, which he entered in 1595. He received his MA from Magdalen in 1598. Around this time, he married Lettice FitzGerald, the daughter of Gerald FitzGerald, Lord Offaly and Catherine Knollys, daughter of Sir Francis Knollys. They had seven sons and three daughters:

- Mabel Digby, Lady Fitzgerald of Dromana and Decies
- Robert Digby, 1st Baron Digby (d. 1642)
- Essex Digby (d. 1683), Bishop of Dromore
- George Digby
- Gerald Digby
- John Digby
- Simon Digby, MP for Philipstown
- Philip Digby, married Margaret Moore (née Forth), daughter of Sir Ambrose Forth, judge of the Irish Court of Admiralty, and widow of Thomas Moore of Croghan, County Offaly
- Lettice Digby, married Sir Roger Langford
- Abigail Digby, died as a child.

Lettice's father had died in 1580, around the time of her birth, and her grandfather the Earl of Kildare had died in 1585, leaving all of his property to his heirs male. She and her husband became increasingly convinced that her grandmother Mabel, the earl's wife, had forged the will in the interest of her sons, Lettice's uncles. After Lettice's last surviving uncle William FitzGerald, 13th Earl of Kildare was lost at sea in April 1599, she assumed the title of "Lady Offaly" and laid claim to that barony and some of the Kildare estates.

Meanwhile, Robert was knighted in Dublin on 4 August 1599 by the Earl of Essex, Lord Lieutenant of Ireland and his wife's first cousin.

Digby divided his energies between affairs in Ireland, where his litigation against the 14th Earl of Kildare for Lettice's claims became extremely involved, and in Warwickshire, where he was appointed a justice of the peace for Warwickshire in 1601. His family's long-standing connection with the locally influential Knollys family, reinforced by his marriage to Lettice (whose mother was a Knollys), probably helped secure his return as Member of Parliament for Warwickshire in the same year. He was named an esquire of the body to Queen Elizabeth before her death in 1603. During the reign of James I, Digby assisted Sir Richard Verney, then High Sheriff of Warwickshire, in apprehending some of those involved in the Gunpowder Plot in November 1605.

Litigation in Ireland over the Kildare estates continued; King James offered to hear the suit in person in 1610, but Lord Kildare declined on the grounds that he could not afford to plead before the English courts. Kildare died in 1612, and Digby had been appointed to the Privy Council of Ireland by 1613, when he sat as MP for Athy but the issue was still unresolved when he died on 24 May 1618. The expenses of litigation had impaired his estate, and he was forced in his will to ask her to provide settlements for their children from the revenues of her Irish lands and a sum of money held by his brother. A settlement was finally achieved in July 1620: Lettice was created Baroness Offaly for life, with remainder to her grandfather's heirs male, and received the manor of Geashill, with 30,000 acres of land, for herself and her children. Her eldest son Robert was simultaneously created Baron Digby, of Geashill.

They are buried in the parish church of St Peter and St Paul, Coleshill.

== Gardens ==
Digby's formal gardens at Coleshill Manor were excavated during the construction of the HS2 railway in 2019–2020. They were described as exceptional by the garden expert Paul Stamper, comparable to those at Hampton Court or Kenilworth Castle.

Parliament of England
Preceded by Fulke Greville; William Combe	Member of Parliament for Warwickshire; 1601; With: Fulke Greville	Succeeded by Sir Edward Greville; Sir Richard Verney
Parliament of Ireland
Preceded by Robert Mothill; Rowland Cussyn	Member of Parliament for Athy; 1613–1615; With: Walter Weldon	Succeeded by Maurice Eustace; Edward Blount
