= John Baynard =

Irish Anglican priest

John Baynard was an Irish Anglican priest in the 17th century: a Non Juror, he was Archdeacon of Connor from 1771 to 1789, when he refused to take the oath of allegiance to William and Mary.

Church of Ireland titles
Preceded by Robert Leslie	Archdeacon of Connor; 1671–1689	Succeeded by Philip Mathews
