= William Armar =

Irish Anglican priest

William Armar was an Irish Anglican priest.

Armar was educated at Trinity College, Dublin, graduating B.A. in 1676 and M.A. in 1680. He was Precentor of Lisburn from 1693 to 1694; and Archdeacon of Connor from 1694 until 1707. Canon Leslie's Connor succession lists however list him as archdeacon of Connor from 1691-3, and note him as excommunicated in 1694 for not having turned up for a visitation.

Church of Ireland titles
Preceded by Philip Mathews	Archdeacon of Connor; 1694–1707	Succeeded by William Smyth
