= Caesar Williamson =

Irish Anglican cleric

- Church: Church of Ireland

Personal details
- Education: Trinity College, Cambridge; Magdalen College, Oxford; Trinity College Dublin

Caesar Williamson was Dean of Cashel from 1671 until 1675.

Williamson was educated at Westminster School, Trinity College, Cambridge, Magdalen College, Oxford and Trinity College, Dublin. A noted author he held livings at Wappenham, Ardstraw, Dromiskin and Kilsaran from 1660. He was Treasurer of Christ Church Cathedral, Dublin from 1664 until 1671.

Church of Ireland titles
Preceded by Essex Digby	Dean of Cashel; 1671–1675	Succeeded by John Glandie
