= John Wetherby (priest) =

18th century Irish dean

Rev. Dr. John Wetherby, Dean of Cashel, died at his lodgings in Dublin in 1736. (Reference: The Newcastle Weekly Courant, Tue, Aug. 7, 1736, page 2; Newspapers.com; https://www.newspapers.com/image/404047569/?match=1&terms=wetherby )

John Wetherby was an Irish senior leader in the first decades of the 18th century.

He was Archdeacon of Connor from 1710 to 1736; Dean of Emly from 1710 to 1713; Dean of Cashel from 1714 until 1736. He was also the Archdeacon of Emly from 1723 to 1724.

Church of Ireland titles
Preceded by William Smyth	Archdeacon of Connor; 1710–1736	Succeeded by Samuel Richardson
Preceded by Enoch Reader	Dean of Emly; 1710–1713	Succeeded by William Perceval
Preceded by William Mullart	Dean of Cashel; 1714–1736	Succeeded by William Gore
Preceded by John Hickey	Archdeacon of Emly; 1723–1724	Succeeded by John Molles
