= George McKinley =

George McKinley was Archdeacon of Cashell and Emly from 1950 until 1965. McKinley was educated at Trinity College, Dublin and ordained in 1913. After a curacy in Tipperary he was the incumbent at Kilcooly with Ballingary and then Templemore. He was Rural Dean of Thurles from 1941 until 1950; Treasurer of Cashel Cathedral from 1942 to 1947; Prebendary of Fennor in Cashel Cathedral from 1949, and its Precentor from 1949 to 1950.

Church of Ireland titles
Preceded by St. John Drelincourt Seymour	Archdeacon of Cashell and Emly; 1950–1965	Succeeded by George Smith Hogg
