= William Tinsley =

William Tinsley may refer to:

- William Tinsley (publisher) (1831–1902), British publisher
- William Tinsley (architect) (1804–1885), Irish-born architect in the United States
