= George Hogg =

George Hogg may refer to:

- George Hogg (adventurer) (1915–1945), English adventurer
- George Hogg (footballer) (1869–?), Scottish footballer
- George Hogg (priest) (1910–?), Archdeacon of Cashel and Emly
- Brad Hogg (George Bradley Hogg, born 1971), Australian cricketer
- George Alfred Hogg, member of the crew of the RMS Titanic (lookout)
