= John Macdonnell =

John Cotter Macdonnell (1821 – 9 September 1902) was Dean of Cashel from 1862 to 1873.

== Biography ==
Macdonnell was educated at Trinity College, Dublin and was placed in the first class in the final divinity examination in 1846. Further studies saw him receive the Master of Arts (MA) in 1855, Bachelor of Divinity (BD) in 1856, and the Doctorate of Divinity (DD) in 1860.

He was ordained deacon in 1846 and priest in 1847, and began his career as a Curate at St. Patrick's Cathedral, Dublin. He was the Incumbent Vicar of Laracor from 1854 to 1862 before his years as Dean 1862–1873. That year, he was asked by his college friend William Connor Magee (at this point Bishop of Peterborough) to become Vicar of St Mary's Leicester, moving two years later in 1875 to Rector of Walgrave, and in 1880 to Rector of Misterton, Leicestershire; He was private chaplain to Bishop Magee throughout his time as bishop of Peterborough (1873–1891), and in 1878 was appointed an Honorary Canon of Peterborough Cathedral, changing in 1883 to a Residentiary Canon at Peterborough.

He wrote several books including a biography of his old friend, Life and Correspondence of William Magee (1896), described at the time as one of the more outspoken pieces of ecclesiastical biography printed. He also wrote "The Doctrine of Atonement" (1858), "Shall we commute?" (1869), and an Essay on Cathedrals in Ireland (1872).

He died at his house in Peterborough after a long illness on 9 September 1902, and he was buried in Peterborough Cathedral four days later. His wife had died seven years earlier, and he was survived by a son, Frederick T. Macdonnell, and a daughter Charlotte Jane Macdonnell, who married Sir Shirley Salt, 3rd Baronet.

Church of Ireland titles
Preceded by Ogle William Moore	Dean of Cashel; 1862–1873	Succeeded by William Pakenham Walsh
