= William Pakenham =

William Pakenham may refer to:

- William Pakenham, 4th Earl of Longford (1819–1887), Anglo-Irish peer and politician
- William Pakenham (Royal Navy officer) (1861–1933), Anglo-Irish naval commander, nephew of the above

== See also ==
- W. S. Pakenham-Walsh (William Sandford Pakenham-Walsh), missionary
