= William Mullart =

Irish Anglican priest

William Mullart was an Irish Anglican priest in the early 18th century.

He was Dean of Cashel from 1706 until his death on 18 May 1713.

Religious titles
Preceded by Henry Price	Dean of Cashel; 1713–1736	Succeeded by John Wetherby
