= Michael Chang (bishop) =

Anglican bishop (1898–1973)

Kwang-Hsu Michael Chang
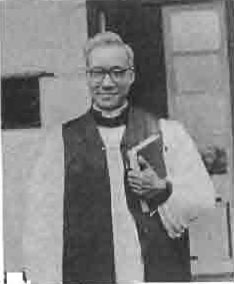
- Anglican bishop of Fukien
- Born: January 1898; Luoyuan, China
- Died: May 12, 1973 (aged 75); Fuzhou, China
- Occupation: Bishop

The Rt. Rev. Kwang-Hsu Michael Chang was a bishop of the Anglican Church. He was educated at Trinity College Foochow and ordained in 1923. He was consecrated an Assistant Bishop of Kwangsi-Hunan on 10 October 1943 and appointed Bishop of Fukien in 1944.
