= John Glandie =

Irish Anglican priest (died 1694)

John Glandie, B.D. was an Irish Anglican priest in the second half of the 17th century.

A Prebendary of Christ Church Cathedral, Dublin he was Dean of Cashel from 1676 until his death on 22 January 1694.

Religious titles
Preceded by Caesar Williamson	Dean of Cashel; 1676–1694	Succeeded by Henry Price
