= David Woodworth =

Irish Anglican priest

Gerald Mark David Woodworth (1939–1994) was an Anglican priest in Ireland, who was described as "a rare southern Protestant radical".

Woodworth was educated at Trinity College, Dublin, receiving a BA in 1962 and an MA in 1969, and the Church of Ireland Theological College, graduating in 1964; and was ordained as a deacon in 1964 and as a priest in 1965. After curacies in Dublin he held incumbencies at Kilkenny then Bandon. He was Archdeacon and Dean of Cashel from 1984 until his death on 11 July 1994. Woodworth was instrumental to the conservation of the Bolton Library, and was succeeded by Dr. Philip Knowles.
