= Joseph Palmer (priest) =

Irish Anglican priest

Very Reverend Joseph Palmer
- Church: Church of Ireland
- Province: Dublin
- Diocese: Cashel and Ossory
- See: Dean of Cashel
- Installed: 1787
- Term ended: 1829
- Predecessor: John Jebb
- Successor: Samuel Adams

Orders
- Ordination: 5 May 1776 by Bishop Jonathan Shipley
- Rank: Dean

Personal details
- Born: 13 June 1749 Great Torrington, Devon, England
- Died: 2 May 1829 (aged 79)
- Spouse: Elizabeth Edwards (m. 1786)
- Education: Exeter College, Oxford

Joseph Palmer (1749–1829) was an Irish Anglican priest in the late 18th century and the first decades of the 19th.

Matriculating at Exeter College, Oxford in 1766, aged 16, he graduated B.A. in 1770, and M.A. in 1772. He was ordained as deacon on 25 September 1774 by Bishop Frederick Keppel to the office of curate at Langtree on a stipend of £40 per year. He was ordained as priest of St James Parish Church by Bishop Jonathan Shipley on 5 May 1776.

He was Chancellor of Ferns from 1779 to 1802. In 1787 he became Dean of Cashel and in 1802 Precentor of Waterford, holding both posts until his death on 2 May 1829.

Religious titles
Preceded by John Jebb	Dean of Cashel; 1787–1829	Succeeded by Samuel Adams
