= Mabel Digby =

Anglo-Irish noblewoman

- Lady of Dromana and Decies
- Born: Sometime after 1598; Coleshill, Warwickshire, England
- Died: Unknown; Dromana, County Waterford, Ireland
- Noble family: FitzGerald
- Spouses: Sir Gerald FitzGerald, Lord of Dromana and Decies; Donagh O'Brien
- Issue: Sir John FitzGerald, Lord of Dromana and Decies; Lettice FitzGerald; Unnamed daughter
- Father: Sir Robert Digby
- Mother: Lettice FitzGerald

Mabel Digby, Lady of Dromana and Decies (dates of birth and death unknown) was an Anglo-Irish noblewoman being the eldest daughter of Sir Robert Digby and Lettice FitzGerald, 1st Baroness Offaly. She was the wife of Sir Gerald FitzGerald, Lord of Dromana and Decies. In 1642, during an Irish rebellion, she was openly sympathetic to the Irish and entertained them at Dromana Castle. She later handed the castle over to them.

== Family ==
Mabel was born on an unknown date sometime after 1598 in Coleshill, Warwickshire, England, the eldest daughter and one of the ten children of Sir Robert Digby and Lettice FitzGerald, suo jure 1st Baroness Offaly. Her eldest brother was Robert Digby, 1st Baron Digby, and another brother was Essex Digby, Bishop of Dromore.

== Marriages and issue ==
She married her first husband Sir Gerald FitzGerald, Lord of Dromana and Decies on an unknown date. He was the son and heir of Sir John Og FitzGerald, Lord of Dromana and Decies, and Elinor Butler. She was described as having been "suitably English and Protestant". She was said to have dominated Sir Gerald. They made their principal residence at Dromana Castle, County Waterford, and together had three children:

- Sir John FitzGerald, Lord of Dromana and Decies (died 1 March 1664), married firstly Katherine Le Poer, by whom he had his only daughter and heiress Katherine FitzGerald, Viscountess Grandison; he married secondly, Helen McCarthy
- Lettice FitzGerald, married Parliamentarian Major Richard Franklyn of Coolbach
- Daughter whose name is unknown, married Thomas Walsh of Piltown, County Waterford

Upon the death of her husband on 6 August 1643, Mabel married secondly Donagh O'Brien of Arragh.

== Rebellion of 1641 ==
On 23 October 1641, the major Irish rebellion of 1641 broke out in Ulster, and by December had spread to County Waterford.

Although her husband sided with the English, Mabel showed herself sympathetic to the Irish rebels and in 1642 entertained them at Dromana Castle serving them "beefes, muttons, bread and beere". In mid-September 1642, she handed the castle over to them; however, it was shortly afterward besieged and captured by the English.

== Death ==
Mabel died on an unknown date at Dromana. Her granddaughter, Katherine, inherited the entire Dromana estate upon the death of Mabel's only son in 1664. The FitzGeralds had managed to keep their estates intact during the Cromwellian settlements due to their Protestant religion and the influence of Mabel's Parliamentarian son-in-law Richard Franklyn, who served as a major in Oliver Cromwell's army.
