= Harriet Villiers =

Anglo-Irish noblewoman (1680–1736)

- Born: 1680; Blandford Forum, Dorset, England
- Died: 21 October 1736 (aged 55–56); England
- Buried: Layston, Buntingford, Hertfordshire
- Spouse: Robert Pitt
- Issue Detail: Thomas Pitt; William Pitt; Harriot Villiers; Catherine Pitt
- Father: Edward FitzGerald-Villiers
- Mother: Katherine FitzGerald

Lady Harriet Pitt (née Villiers; 1680 – 21 October 1736) was an Anglo-Irish noblewoman who was the mother and grandmother of two British prime ministers, William Pitt the elder and William Pitt the younger.

== Family ==
Villiers was born into Anglo-Irish nobility as the daughter of Edward FitzGerald-Villiers and the Irish heiress Katherine FitzGerald.

== Life ==
In 1704, she married Robert Pitt, who was elected to the House of Commons in the 1705 general election. Together Harriet and Robert had four children:

- Thomas Pitt, who was an MP
- William Pitt, who was an MP and prime minister (1756–57, 1757–1762 and 1766–1768)
- Harriot Pitt married William Corbet MP.
- Catherine Pitt married Robert Nedham MP.

== Death ==
Villiers died in 1736 and was buried at Layston Church in Buntingford, Hertfordshire. Her mother and her son are buried at Westminster Abbey.
