= Christ Church at the Quarry =

Historic church in Ohio, United States

- Christ Church At The Quarry
- U.S. National Register of Historic Places
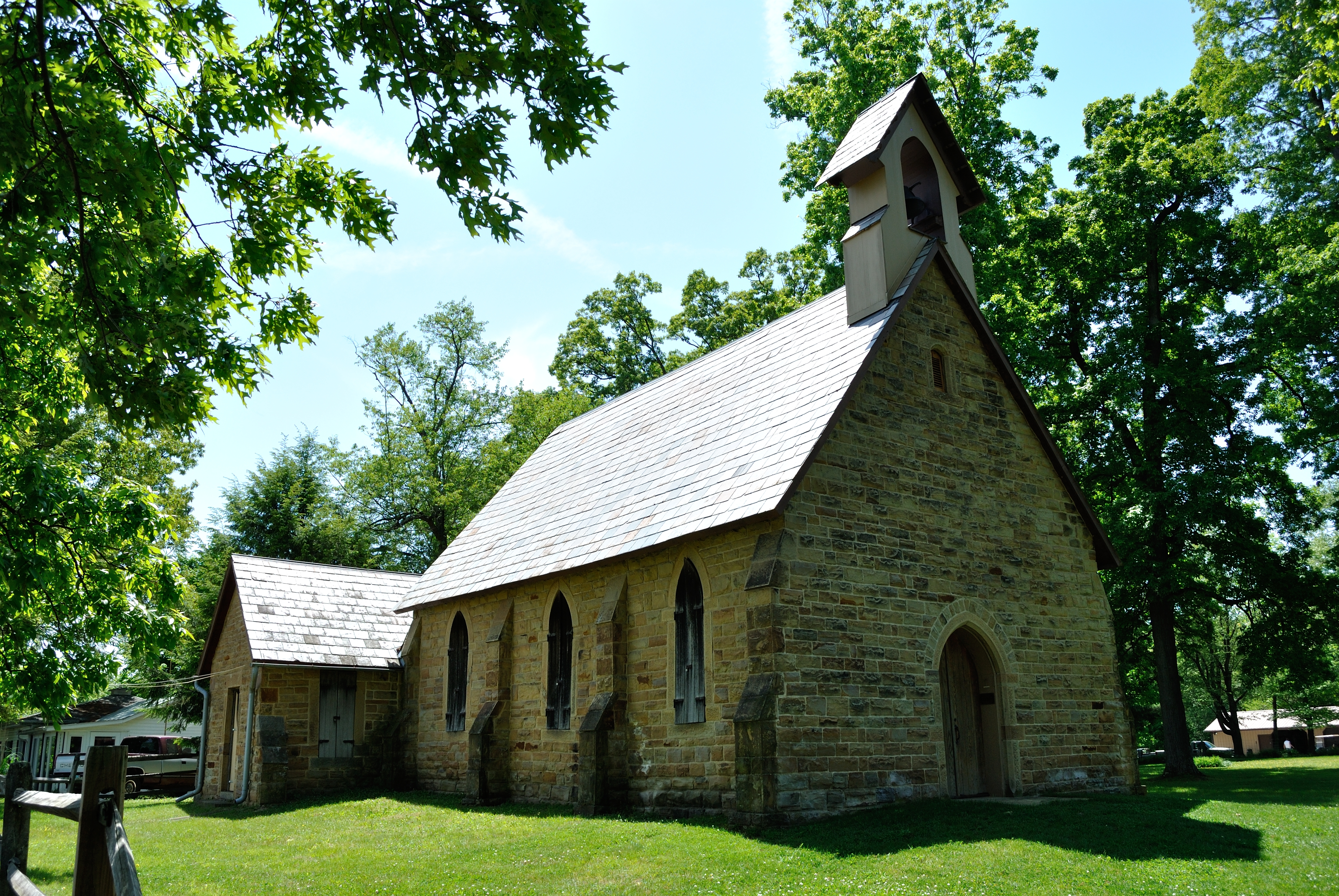

- Location within Ohio Location within the United States
- Nearest city: Gambier, Ohio
- Coordinates: 40°23′16″N 82°22′15″W
- Area: 0.4 acres (0.16 ha)
- Built: 1863
- Architect: William Tinsley
- NRHP reference No.: 75001446
- Added to NRHP: September 25, 1975

The Christ Church at the Quarry is a historic church in Gambier, Ohio. It was built in 1863 and added to the National Register of Historic Places in 1975.

It is a "beautiful stone chapel" with both Gothic and Celtic design influences, with exterior walls built of stone cut from a nearby quarry.

It derived from Kenyon College students' starting a mission in Gambier and opening a Sunday School. Then participants in the mission sought to build a church. It is likely that the church was designed by architect William Tinsley. Tinsley designed Ascension Hall on the Kenyon College campus around that time.
