= David Clarke (priest) =

Anglican Priest

David George Alexander Clarke was an Anglican priest.

Clarke was educated at Trinity College, Dublin and ordained in 1949. He served at: Dromore (curacy); Clonbroney, Clogher, Abbeystrewry, Usworth and Kilrossanty (incumbencies); St Patrick's Cathedral, Dublin (Prebendary); and Cashel (Dean). He retired in 1983.
