= Henry Price (priest) =

Irish Anglican priest

Henry Price was an Irish Anglican priest in the late 17th and early 18th centuries.

He was Treasurer and Prebendary of Kildare from 1674 until 1706 when he became Dean of Cashel, a post he held until his death in 1706.

Religious titles
Preceded by John Glandie	Dean of Cashel; 1713–1736	Succeeded by William Mullart
