= William Tinsley (architect) =

Irish architect

- Resting place: Crown Hill Cemetery and Arboretum, Section 7, lot 43; 39.8208837°N 86.1752786°W

William Tinsley (7 February 1804 – 14 June 1885) was an Irish architect who immigrated to the United States in 1851. He and his family settled in Cincinnati where Tinsley received commissions to design several prestigious buildings in the Midwestern United States.

== Ireland ==
William, the younger son of Thomas Tinsley and Lucy Brough, was born in Clonmel, County Tipperary. In about 1820 he entered the family building business. Although baptised into the Church of Ireland, Tinsley converted to Methodism at the age of twenty-one. Following the death of his father in 1825, William took over the company and received several commissions from local landowners: most notably he rebuilt Darling Hill, seat of the Pennefather family. He studied the designs of church architect James Pain, and was made the official architect for the Diocese of Lismore on Pain's death. Tinsley designed the chapter house of St. John's Cathedral, Cashel, which housed the Bolton Library.

== United States ==
In 1851, following a decline in business after the Great Famine, Tinsley and his wife Lucy and their nine children emigrated to the US. They sailed from Waterford to New York via Liverpool before settling in Cincinnati. His first major commission in his adopted country was the original North Western Christian University building which he began in the Winter of 1852-53. He completed several other commissions, among them Christ Church Cathedral on Monument Circle in Indianapolis, River View Cemetery in Aurora, Indiana, work for Rockwell, Kenyon (Ascension Hall), and Wabash colleges, as well as Ohio Wesleyan University, and Bascom Hall at the University of Wisconsin. It is likely that he designed Christ Church at the Quarry (1863) in Gambier, Ohio, near Kenyon College. He was also the architect for Grace Episcopal Church in Pomeroy, Ohio, and St. Philip's Episcopal Church, Circleville, Ohio in 1866-1867. His last major work was the Ohio State School for the Blind at Columbus, Ohio. Following his death in 1885, he was interred at Crown Hill Cemetery in Indianapolis.

=== Bascom Hall ===
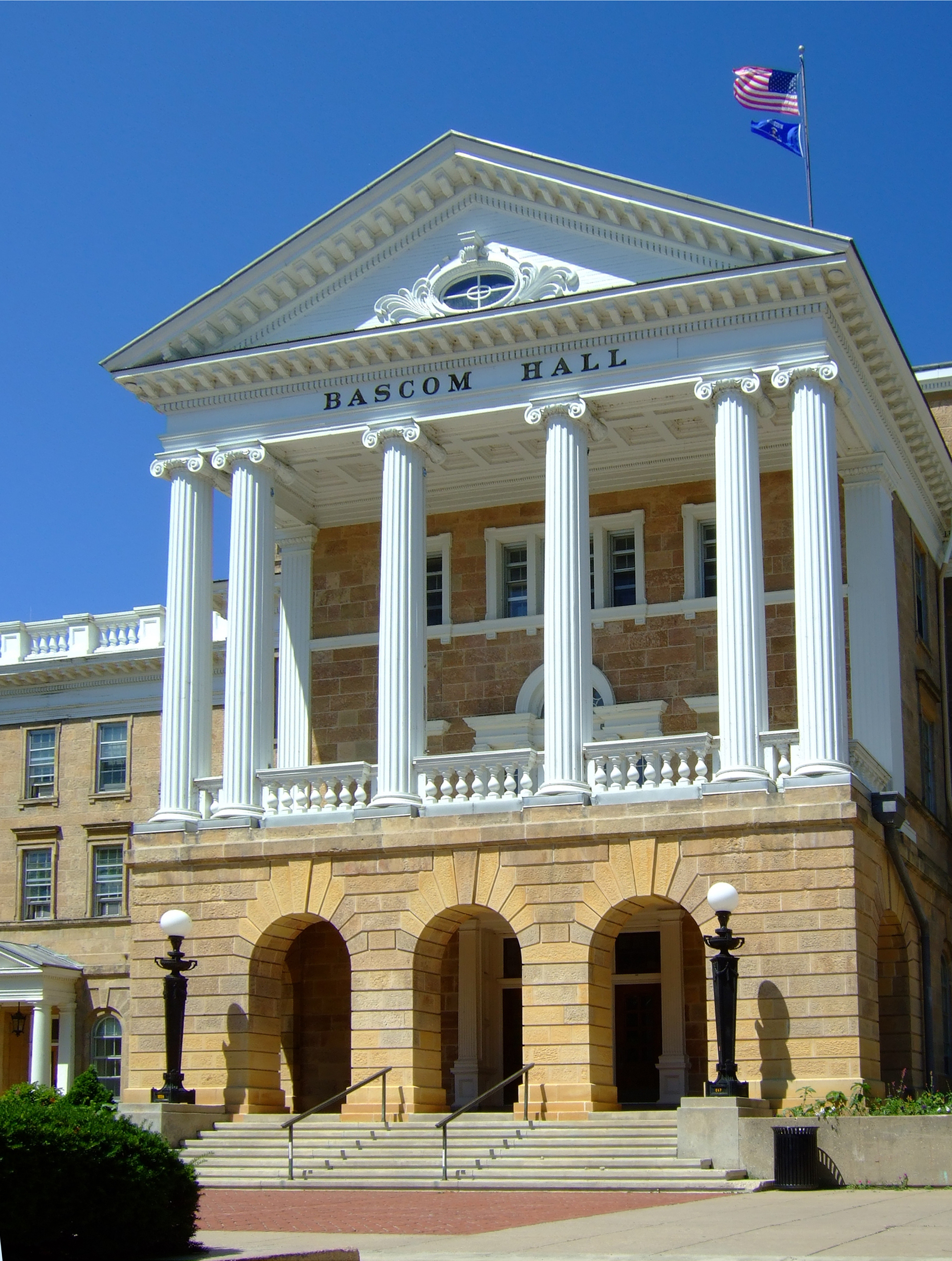
Bascom Hall in its present state.

Originally known as Main Hall, Bascom Hall opened in 1859 as the first entirely instructional building on the University of Wisconsin–Madison campus. The building was expanded through additions in 1899, 1905 and 1927. The building originally featured a towering dome until 1916 when it burned down. The dome was never replaced. In a report from the University Regents in 1856, the building was described as such: "This building is designed for public restrooms, for recitation, lecture, library cabinet, apparatus. It will contain also, the astronomical observatory, the working laboratory, apartments suitable to the residence of two families of the faculty, the principal dining hall for the use of Students, and a chapel. All the departments in Science, Literature and Arts and in the professional schools of Medicine and Law will find ample accommodation in the proposed edifice."

Today the building stands as the iconic centrepiece of the UW-Madison campus and is home to the office of the chancellor of the university, the dean of students and other administrators. The building also does still include a limited number of classrooms as well as two large lecture halls.

== Sources ==
- William Tinsley, architect William N. Pickerill, 1914.
- Victorian architect: the life and work of William Tinsley John Douglas Forbes, 1953.
