= John Molles =

John Molles was an Irish Anglican priest in the 18th-century: a prebendary of Newchapel in Cashel Cathedral he was Archdeacon of Emly from 1736 his death in 1740.
