= Samuel Adams (priest) =

Irish Anglican priest

- Dean of Cashel
- Church: Church of Ireland
- Installed: 1829
- Term ended: 1856
- Predecessor: Joseph Palmer
- Successor: Ogle William Moore

Personal details
- Born: 23 December 1786
- Died: 5 December 1856 (aged 69)
- Education: Trinity College, Dublin

Coat of arms of Samuel Adams

Notes
Confirmed 6 September 1854 by Sir John Bernard Burke, Ulster King of Arms.
Crest
On a mount Vert a cross crosslet fitchee Or charged with a bleeding heart Gules.
Escutcheon
Gules a heart between three cross crosslets fitchee Or.
Motto
In Cruce Salus

Samuel Adams (23 December 1786 – 8 December 1856) was an Irish Anglican priest in the 19th century.

A graduate of Trinity College, Dublin, he became a Prebendary of Elphin in 1813. He was Dean of Cashel from 1829 until his death.

Religious titles
| Preceded by Joseph Palmer | Dean of Cashel; 1829–1856 | Succeeded by Ogle William Moore |
