= Fuzhou Foreign Language School =

- 福建省福州外国语学校
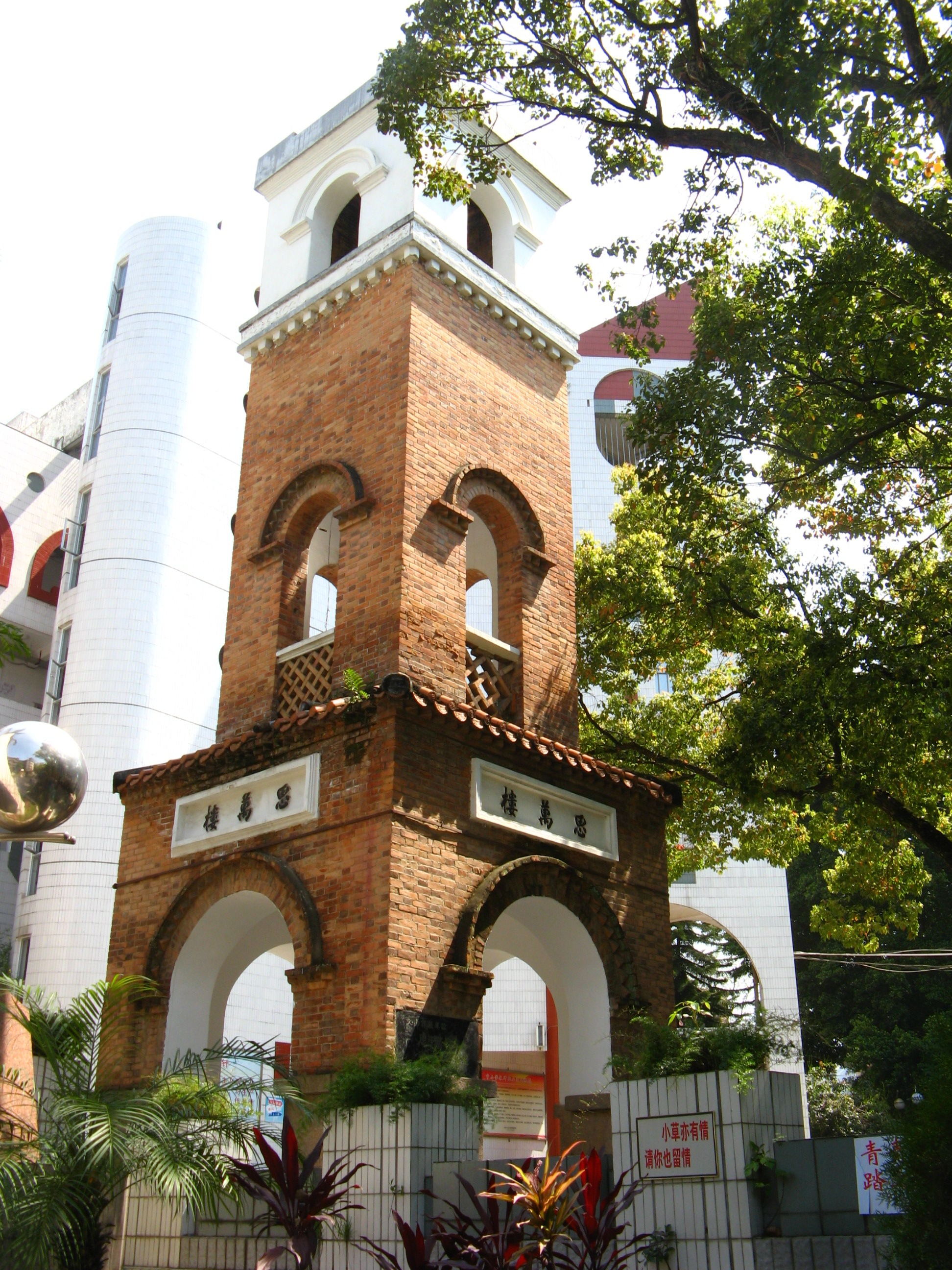
- Pakenham-Walsh Tower on the campus in memory of the first headmaster, erected in 1925

Location
- No. 39 Park Road, Cangshan District; Fuzhou, Fujian; China
- Coordinates: 26.0438°N 119.3144°E

Information
- Type: Public
- Established: 1907
- Principal: Lin Jian (林建)
- Faculty: 225 (as of 2021)
- Enrollment: 2862 (as of 2018)
- Nickname: Fuwai (福外), Jiuzhong(九中）
- Website: Official website (in Simplified Chinese)

Fuzhou Foreign Language School (福建省福州外国语学校) is a municipal public secondary school in Fuzhou, Fujian, China.

== History ==
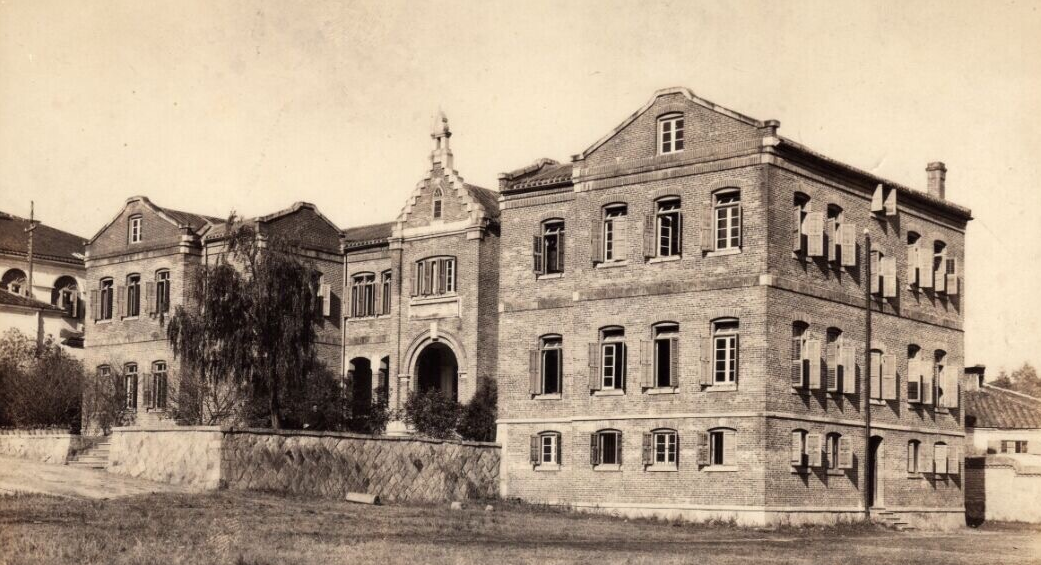
The red brick mansion of Trinity College Foochow (Fuzhou).

Its precursor is St. Mark's College founded in 1907 by W. S. Pakenham-Walsh, a Chaplain of Dublin University Far Eastern Mission. There were only ten students in the first year, and all staff was W. S. Pakenham-Walsh and his wife plus a Chinese teacher. In the beginning, the college was funded by an Irish lady who was familiar W. S. Pakenham-Walsh's father, totally £40. In 1909, there are 150 people applied to the school, taking 100 people. In 1911, after getting a large amount of donation from Pan-Anglican Congress, Church Mission Society decided to merge the college with a middle school and a primary school. W. S. Pakenham-Walsh purchased Russian consulate and surrounding land as the campus of the new school, and named it Trinity College Foochow (Fuzhou). The name indicated its strong relationship with Trinity College Dublin and Christianity. St. Mark's College became the Anglo-Chinese school of Trinity College, where most courses were taught in English and another combined middle school mainly in Chinese language. The school maintained a high English standard, as a result, its students were very popular with society, many of them even began working without graduation. Dublin University Fukien Mission was in charge of the management of the school, hence many teachers and staffers were missionaries who came from Ireland. The students had to study the Bible and participate the religious activities including morning prayer, evening prayer. Graduates of Anglo-Chinese school could enter Saint John's University, Shanghai and Fukien Christian University founded in 1916 without exam. The school applied to Chinese education department for register in 1927, as the school was independence to the Chinese government before. Except for English, the language of courses in Anglo-Chinese school changed to Chinese language. On 2 January 1928, the education department approve the application. After registration, the teaching and administration of the school were transferred to Chinese staff, but still financed by Church Mission Society. In 1928, due to growing public pressure on taking the right of education back and against the "cultural invasion", Rev.W.P.W.Williams resigned from the post of headmaster, who was the last foreigner in this position. In summer 1929, Rev.W.P.W.Williams ordered the Chinese headmaster to fire two students, which caused large scale protest among students, and they succeed at last. In 1930, Anglo-Chinese school merged with the high school of Trinity College.

After the Second Sino-Japanese War broke out, the school first moved to Gutian, and in 1939 moved to Chong'an (now Wuyishan) in North Fujian. In 1941, it was merged with Do-seuk Girls' School from Fuzhou after the city fell. On 15 April 1941, the Japanese aircraft bombed the school, killing 6 students. In summer 1942, the senior high school moved back to Gutian, and the junior high school moved to Minhou near Fuzhou. In 1945, all departments moved back to Fuzhou.

In October 1952, after the Communist Party came to power, it was taken over by the authorities and renamed Fuzhou No. 9 Middle School. In July 1993, the school began using this name, although most townspeople still refer the school as "Jiuzhong" (the abbreviation of No. 9 middle school in Chinese).

=== Trinity College Foochow Badge ===
The Dublin University Far Eastern Mission (founded in 1886) established Trinity College Fuzhou in 1907, now the Fuzhou Foreign Language School. The outline of the school badge is inverted triangle. There is a celtic cross in the center of circular school emblem, surrounding by the Chinese name of the school. The outer circle is decorated with shamrock, the symbol of Ireland, on the top, left and right with a strong Irish style.

== General accreditation ==
The school is an accredited school for the Deutsches Sprachdiplom, which allows its students have the chance to apply for German universities.

== Notable people ==
- Watchman Nee
- Michael Chang
- Chen Jingrun
