= Richard Howlett =

Irish Anglican cleric

Richard Howlet
- Church: Church of Ireland

Personal details
- Education: Trinity College Dublin

Richard Howlett was Dean of Cashel from 1639 until 1641: In the Irish Rebellion of 1641 his house and goods were plundered.

Church of Ireland titles
Preceded by William Chappell	Dean of Cashel; 1639–1661	Succeeded by Essex Digby
