= Gerald Field =

Anglican priest

Gerald Gordon Field (born 1954) is an Anglican priest.

Field was educated at King's College London and the College of the Resurrection Mirfield; and ordained in 1978. After curacies at Broughton and Blackpool he held incumbencies in Skerton, Shap, All Souls, Netherton and Tullamore. He has been Dean of Cashel since 2014.
