= St John Seymour =

St John Drelincourt Seymour MRIA (15 April 1880 – 25 May 1950) was an Irish Anglican priest in the first half of the 20th century who served as Archdeacon of Cashel and Archdeacon of Emly.

Seymour was born in Limerick, Ireland. Educated at Trinity College, Dublin, he was ordained in 1904.

After curacies in Durrow and Thurles he was the incumbent at Toem, Ireland, then Borris, before his years as Archdeacon of Cashell and Emly and Donohill afterwards.

He died on 25 May 1950 in Dublin.

== Select bibliography ==
Source: Ricorso

- United Diocese of Cashel and Emly, 1908, Belfast Public Library
- The Puritans of Ireland 1647-1661, 1912 & Clarendon Press 1969
- Irish Witchcraft and Demonology, 1913 & 1970 (Chap.3, Kyteler Case and its surroundings)
- True Irish Ghost Stories, 1914, 1926
- St Patrick’s Purgatory: A Medieval Pilgrimage in Ireland, 1919, University of Ulster Library
- The Tales of King Solomon, Oxford University Press, London 1924.
- Anglo-Irish Literature 1200-1582, 1929 & Octagon 1970
- Irish Visions of the Otherworld: A Contribution to the Study of Medieval Visions, 1930
- Adventures and Experiences of a Seventeenth Century Clergyman, 1909, Belfast Public Library
- Liber Primus Kilkenniensis - translation of 15th-century edition
- The Ormond Fragments 1 & 2 - Royal Irish Academy, 1932-1934

Church of Ireland titles
Preceded by George White	Archdeacon of Cashell and Emly; 1929–1950	Succeeded by George McKinley
