= William Smyth (priest, born 1662) =

Irish Anglican priest (1662–1710)

William Smyth (9 July 1662 – 3 February 1710) was an Irish Anglican priest.

Born at Lisburn in County Antrim in 1665, he was the son of James Smyth of Mountown, County Down, by his wife Francisca, daughter of Edward Dowdall of Mountown. He was educated at Trinity College Dublin. He was Precentor of Down Cathedral from 1699 to 1703; Treasurer of Lisburn Cathedral from 1703 to 1705; Prebendary of Rasharkin at Lisburn from 1705 to 1707; and Archdeacon of Connor from 1707 until his death.

His brother was Bishop of Down and Connor from 1699 until his death in 1720.

Church of Ireland titles
Preceded by William Armar	Archdeacon of Connor; 1707–1710	Succeeded by John Wetherby
