= George White (dean of Cashel) =

Irish Anglican clergyman

Rev. George Purcell White (1842 – 14 January 1908) was an Irish Anglican clergyman who was Dean of Cashel from 1890 to 1908.

He was the son of James White. He was educated at Trinity College, Dublin and ordained in 1864. His first post was as Curate of Athassel, of which parish he later became the incumbent. He moved to Templemore in 1881, and remained there until his son took over from him in 1903.

He married Henrietta Poole Townsend in 1865. He died in Cashel, aged 66.

Church of Ireland titles
Preceded by Arthur Henry Leech	Dean of Cashel; 1890–1908	Succeeded by Maurice William Day
