= W. S. Pakenham-Walsh =

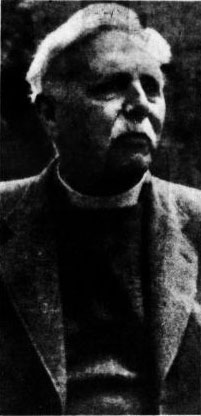
- Born: William Sandford Pakenham-Walsh; 1868; Ireland
- Died: 26 April 1960 (aged 92); England
- Occupations: Christian missionary, scholar, educationalist, writer
- Writing career
- Notable work: A Tudor Story: The Return of Anne Boleyn

William Sandford Pakenham-Walsh (simplified Chinese: 万拔文; traditional Chinese: 萬拔文; Pinyin: Wàn Báwén; Foochow Romanized: Uâng Bĕk-ùng; 1868 – April 26, 1960) was a Christian clergyman, educationalist and writer. He was most famous for his work Tudor Story.

== Life ==
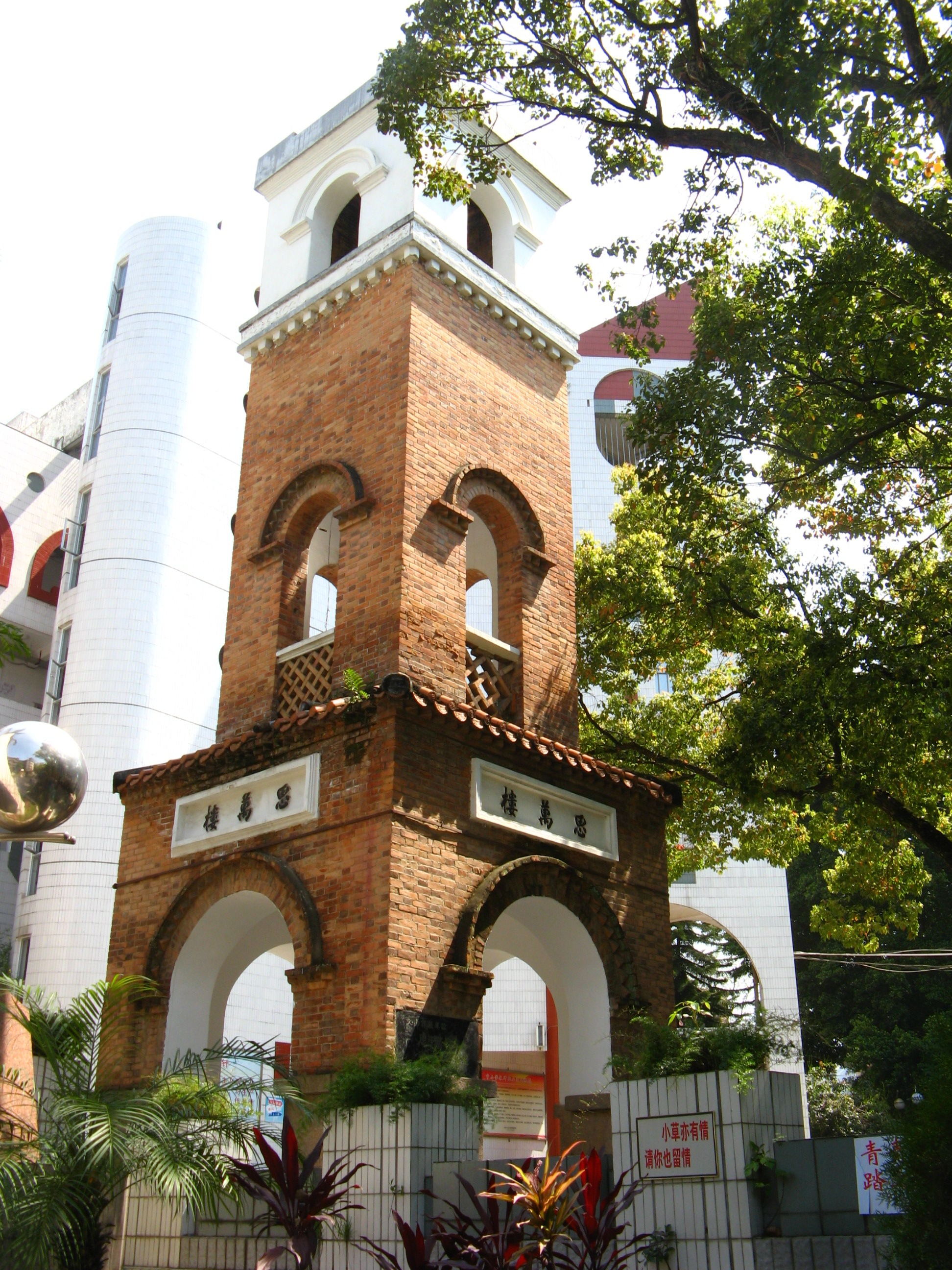
Pakenham-Walsh Tower (思萬樓) of Foochow Trinity College, erected in 1925. It is on the campus of Fuzhou Foreign Language School today.

W. S. Pakenham-Walsh was born in 1868 into a distinguished Irish clerical family. His middle name, Sandford, was given to him by his father, William Pakenham Walsh who served as curate and later Rector of Sandford Parish in Dublin.

In 1897, W. S. Pakenham-Walsh went to China under the auspices of CMS to work with the Dublin University Fukien Mission as Chaplain to the British community in Fuzhou, where he labored as a pastor of St. John's Church in Cangshan. In 1907, he opened St. Mark's Anglo-Chinese College, later renamed to the Foochow Trinity College and again to the Fuzhou Foreign Language School. W. S. Pakenham-Walsh retired in 1919, but he remained in China until 1921. On his return to England he became Vicar of Sulgrave, Northamptonshire, and also a keen scholar and educationalist.

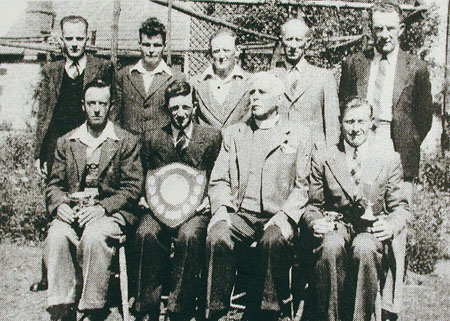
Sulgrave Billiard Club in the 1930s. Rev. Pakenham-Walsh was seated in the front row second from right

W. S. Pakenham-Walsh's most notable work is his Tudor Story that he completed at age 90. His strong interest in Anne Boleyn began in 1917 during his missionary trip in Fuzhou, when he found in the Fuzhou British Community Library books related to Anne Boleyn's life. Since then W. S. Pakenham-Walsh had been compiling a summary of her life. Motivated by his desire to unveil the true Anne Boleyn, he claimed to have experienced a series of spiritual experiences following a prayer at Boleyn's burial site that she might become his guardian angel, which led him to seek clairvoyants who helped to channel the spirit of Anne Boleyn. In his diary he said that for 30 years he had been in constant touch with King Henry VIII, Anne Boleyn, and other figures of the Tudor Court.

W. S. Pakenham-Walsh died on 26 April 1960.

== Selected works ==
- Some Typical Christians of South China (1905)
- Nestorius and the Nestorian Mission in China (1908)
- Chants in War (1916)
- Anne Boleyn: or, The queen of May – A Play in Four Acts (1921)
- Three Medical Missionaries: in Memoriam (1922)
- The Church of St. James, Sulgrave (Notes on Famous Churches and Abbeys) (1925)
- Fifty Miles Around Sulgrave (1929)
- Through Cloud and Sunshine (1932)
- Twenty Years in China (1935)
- A Tudor Story: The Return of Anne Boleyn (1963), ISBN 978-0-227-67678-3
