= Simon Digby (bishop) =

Irish Anglican bishop (died 1720)

- Bishop of Elphin
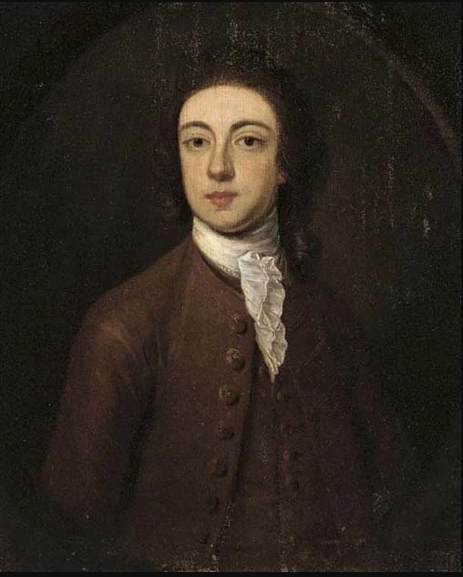
- Church: Church of Ireland
- Diocese: Elphin
- Previous posts: Dean of Kildare (1678–1679); Limerick, Ardfert and Aghadoe (1679–1690)

Orders
- Consecration: 23 March 1679 by Michael Boyle

Personal details
- Died: 7 April 1720
- Parents: Essex Digby
- Spouse: Elizabeth Westenra
- Children: 16
- Education: Trinity College Dublin

Simon Digby was an Irish Anglican bishop at the end of the seventeenth century and the beginning of the eighteenth century. He was the son of Essex Digby and attended Trinity College Dublin. After a short spell as Dean of Kildare in 1678–1679, he was nominated Bishop of Limerick, Ardfert and Aghadoe on 24 January 1679 and consecrated on 23 March that year. He was summoned to attend the short-lived Patriot Parliament called by James II of England in 1689. In 1690 he was translated to Elphin, being nominated on 4 December and appointed by letters patent on 12 January the following year. He died in office on 7 April 1720.

Church of England titles
Preceded by John Vesey	Bishop of Limerick, Ardfert and Aghadoe; 1679–1691	Succeeded by Nathanael Wilson
Vacant	Bishop of Elphin; 1691–1720	Succeeded by Henry Downes
