= Essex Digby =

English Anglican priest

Essex Digby was an English Anglican priest in Ireland in the second half of the seventeenth century.

Digby came from an eminent family. He was the son of Sir Robert Digby of Coleshill, Warwickshire and Lettice FitzGerald, of Geashill, Ireland, granddaughter of Gerald FitzGerald, 11th Earl of Kildare. John Digby, 1st Earl of Bristol, was his uncle, Robert Digby, 1st Baron Digby, his brother and Simon Digby his son. He was educated at Trinity College, Dublin. He was Dean of Cashel from 1661 until 1671 and Bishop of Dromore from his consecration on 27 February 1671 until his death on 12 May 1683.
