= Philip Knowles =

Irish Anglican priest

Philip John Knowles (born 1948) is an Anglican priest.

Knowles was educated at Trinity College, Dublin and the Church of Ireland Theological College; and ordained in 1977. After a curacy in Lisburn he held incumbencies at Dromahair then Gorey. He was the Dean of Cashel from 1995 until 2013. Knowles oversaw the conservation programme of the Bolton Library in partnership with the University of Limerick.
