= Robert Digby, 1st Baron Digby =

Anglo-Irish peer

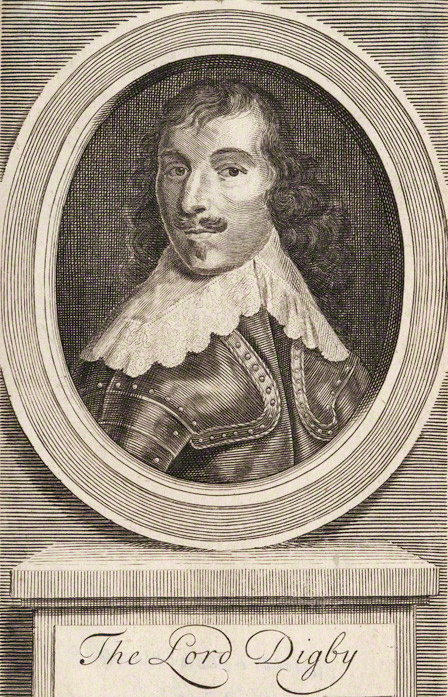
Lord Digby

Robert Digby, 1st Baron Digby (died 6 June 1642), was an Anglo-Irish peer.

Digby was the son of Sir Robert Digby of Coleshill, Warwickshire, and Lettice FitzGerald, of Geashill, Ireland, granddaughter of Gerald FitzGerald, 11th Earl of Kildare. John Digby, 1st Earl of Bristol, was his uncle, and Essex Digby, Bishop of Dromore, his brother. Digby notably served as Governor of King's County in Ireland. In 1620, he was raised to the Peerage of Ireland as Baron Digby, of Geashill. He married, firstly, Lady Sarah Boyle, daughter of Richard Boyle, 1st Earl of Cork, and Catherine Fenton; this marriage produced a son, Kildare Digby (c. 1627 – 1661). Digby married secondly, Elizabeth Altham, daughter of Sir James Altham and his second wife, Mary Stapers. Digby died in 1642 and was succeeded in the barony by his son Kildare. They are buried in the parish church of St Peter and St Paul, Coleshill.

Coat of arms of Robert Digby, 1st Baron Digby
Crest An ostrich, holding in the beak a horse-shoe all proper. Escutcheon Azure, a fleur-de-lis argent Supporters On either side a monkey proper environed about the middle and lined or. Motto DEO NON FORTUNA (From God not chance)

Peerage of Ireland
New creation	Baron Digby; 1620–1642	Succeeded by Kildare Digby
