= Katherine FitzGerald, Viscountess Grandison =

17th-century Irish viscountess

Katherine FitzGerald
- Suo jure Viscountess Grandison
- Born: August 1660; Dromana House, Villierstown, County Waterford, Ireland
- Died: 26 December 1725 (aged 65); London
- Buried: Westminster Abbey
- Spouses: John Le Poer, 2nd Earl of Tyrone (annulled); Brigadier-General Hon. Edward Villiers; General William Steuart
- Issue Detail: Mary Villiers; Harriet Villiers; John FitzGerald Villiers, 5th Viscount Grandison, 1st Earl Grandison, & others
- Father: Sir John FitzGerald, Lord of the Decies (died 1664)
- Mother: Katherine Le Poer

Katherine FitzGerald, suo jure Viscountess Grandison (1660–1725), was a wealthy Irish heiress, being the only child of Sir John FitzGerald of Dromana, County Waterford. She inherited the Dromana estate in 1664 upon the death of her father. She was married three times; firstly to John Le Poer, 2nd Earl of Tyrone; secondly to Brigadier-General, Hon. Edward FitzGerald-Villiers; and thirdly and lastly to General William Steuart.

She was granted the rank of a Viscountess by Royal Warrant on 6 January 1700, and she died insane 25 years later.

== Family and inheritance ==
Katherine FitzGerald was born in August 1660 at Dromana House, Villierstown, County Waterford, Ireland, the only child and heiress of Sir John FitzGerald, Lord of the Decies (died 1664) and Katherine Power (died 22 August 1660), daughter of John Power, 5th Baron Power, of Curraghmore and Ruth Pypho.

The lords of the Decies had managed to keep their lands intact through the Cromwellian settlements. This was due to their Protestant religion, and the marriage of Katherine's aunt, Lettice to Parliamentarian Major Richard Franklyn, who protected the family's interests.

Katherine inherited the entire Dromana estate on 1 March 1664, at the age of three, upon the death of her father, who was the son of Sir Gerald FitzGerald, Lord of the Decies (died 1643) and Mabel Digby. Katherine's mother had died shortly after her birth; and her stepmother Helen MacCarty had not produced offspring. Being only a minor, Katherine's guardians were King Charles II of England, and her maternal uncle, Richard Le Poer, 6th Baron Le Poer of Curraghmore (later the 1st Earl of Tyrone) (1630- 14 October 1690).

== Marriages and issue ==
Her ambitious uncle Baron Le Poer, wanting to unite the Curraghmore and Dromana estates, arranged a marriage between Katherine and his own son and heir, John. On 20 May 1673, Katherine and John were married by Gilbert Sheldon, Archbishop of Canterbury in his chapel at Lambeth Palace. She was three months short of her 13th birthday, and John was a boy of eight. That same year, her uncle was created 1st Earl of Tyrone and Viscount Decies by King Charles. Two years later, Katherine, who had not wanted to marry her eight-year-old cousin John Le Poer, appealed to the Archbishop to grant her an annulment on the grounds that she had not freely consented to the marriage.

In March 1677, Katherine eloped and married an officer, Brigadier-General, Hon. Edward Villiers, the son of George Villiers, 4th Viscount Grandison and Mary Leigh, and a cousin of Barbara Villiers, the notorious and powerful mistress of King Charles. Following her clandestine marriage to Edward, there ensued a lengthy legal battle, which Katherine eventually won, due to the help from Edward's influential cousin, Barbara. Her marriage to Edward Villiers was thus declared legal and valid, while her uncle was forced to give back her lands and renounce the title of Viscount Decies.

John Le Poer, her erstwhile husband later succeeded to the title of 2nd Earl of Tyrone in October 1690.

An artist, who was a follower of court painter Sir Peter Lely, painted her portrait between 1685 and 1690. The portrait, which is in a private art collection, shows Katherine to have been slender, with auburn hair and fair skin.

Together Katherine and Edward had four children:

- Mary Villiers (died 24 December 1725), married Brigadier-General Hon. William Steuart (d.1736) M.P., her stepfather's eldest nephew and adopted son; brother of Admiral James Steuart M.P.
- Harriet Villiers (died 21 October 1736), married Robert Pitt, by whom she had a son, William Pitt, 1st Earl of Chatham
- John FitzGerald Villiers, 5th Viscount Grandison, and 1st Earl Grandison (1684- 14 May 1766), married Frances Cary, by whom he had issue.
- William Villiers

Edward died in 1693, and she married her third husband, General William Steuart, Commander-in-Chief of Queen Anne's forces in Ireland, and a Member of the Irish Parliament for County Waterford. This marriage was childless.

Shortly after the death of her former father-in-law, Viscount Grandison, Katherine was granted the rank of Viscountess by Royal Warrant issued by King William III of England on 6 January 1700.

== Death ==
She died insane almost 26 years later in London on 26 December 1725, aged 65. She was buried in Westminster Abbey. One month later General William Steuart married Eliza Alston, daughter of Sir Rowland Alston (1654–1697), 2nd Bart., of Odell Castle, Bedfordshire, by his wife Temperance, daughter and heiress of Thomas Crew, 2nd Baron Crew.

== Ancestry ==
Ancestors of Katherine FitzGerald, Viscountess Grandison

Sir John FitzGerald, Lord of Dromana and Decies
Sir John Og FitzGerald, Lord of Dromana and Decies
Ellen FitzGibbon
Sir Gerald FitzGerald, Lord of Dromana and Decies
James Butler, 2nd Baron Dunboyne
Elinor Butler
Margaret FitzPatrick
Sir John FitzGerald, Lord of Dromana and Decies
Sir George Digby
Sir Robert Digby
Abigail Heveningham
Mabel Digby
Gerald FitzGerald, Lord FitzGerald
Lettice FitzGerald, 1st Baroness Offaly
Catherine Knollys
Katherine FitzGerald
Richard Le Poer, 4th Baron Le Poer
John Og Le Poer
Katherine Barry
John Le Poer, 5th Baron Le Poer
David de Barry, 5th Viscount Buttevant
Helen Barry
Ellen Roche
Katherine Le Poer
Robert Pypho, of Dublin
Ruth Pypho
