= Lettice Digby, 1st Baroness Offaly =

Irish noble

Lettice FitzGerald
- 1st Baroness Offaly
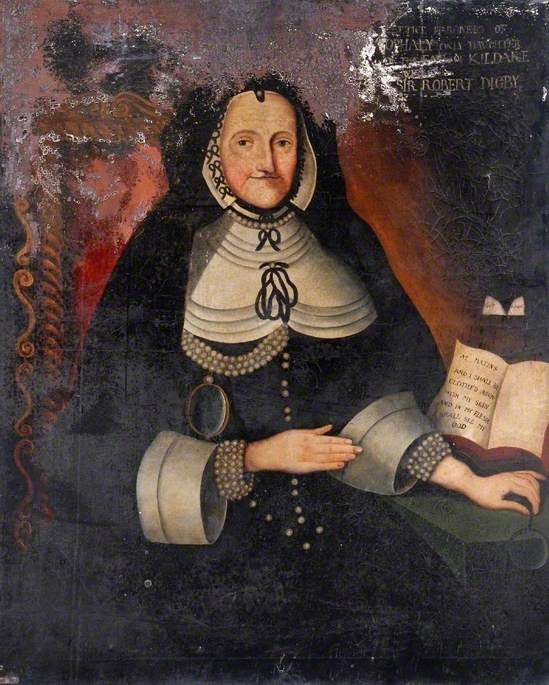
- Born: c.1580
- Died: 1 December 1658
- Buried: Parish Church of Coleshill, Warwickshire, England
- Noble family: FitzGerald dynasty
- Spouse: Sir Robert Digby
- Issue: Mabel Digby; Robert Digby, 1st Baron Digby; Essex Digby, Bishop of Dromore; George Digby; Gerald Digby; John Digby; Simon Digby MP; Philip Digby; Lettice Digby; Abigail Digby
- Father: Gerald FitzGerald, Lord Offaly
- Mother: Catherine Knollys

Lettice FitzGerald, 1st Baroness Offaly (c. 1580 – 1 December 1658) was an Irish noblewoman and a member of the FitzGerald dynasty. Although she became heiress-general to the Earls of Kildare on the death of her father, the title instead went to the next FitzGerald male heir when her grandfather, the 11th Earl of Kildare, died in 1585. In 1620, she was created suo jure Baroness Offaly by King James I of England.

She was the wife of Sir Robert Digby, a landed English aristocrat by whom she had ten children. They were a notoriously litigious couple, who spent many years asserting their rights before numerous courts, and were quite prepared to accuse even their closest relatives of wrongdoing.

In early 1642, around the age of about sixty-two, her castle of Geashill was besieged by a force of insurgents from the O'Dempsey clan; she managed to hold out against them until October 1642. Her defence has been described as having been the "most spirited episode in the history of the Irish Rebellion of 1641".

== Family ==
Lettice was born in about 1580, the only child and heir of Gerald FitzGerald, Lord Offaly, by Catherine Knollys, who was a younger daughter of Catherine Carey and Sir Francis Knollys. Lettice's maternal great-grandmother was Mary Boleyn, elder sister of Anne Boleyn, the second queen consort of King Henry VIII of England, who had been the lover of Mary prior to his courtship of Anne and possibly the biological father of her daughter Catherine. Her paternal grandparents were Gerald FitzGerald, 11th Earl of Kildare and Mabel Browne. One of her aunts, and after whom she was likely named, was Lettice Knollys, the celebrated rival of Queen Elizabeth I, who was also a first cousin of the Knollys family.

Her father died in June 1580, around the time of her birth, so Lettice never knew him. He was nineteen years of age. Upon his death, Lettice became heiress-general to the Earls of Kildare; however, the earldom passed to her uncle, Henry. Her mother married secondly Sir Philip Butler, but it is not known whether she had additional children.

== Marriage and issue ==
On 19 April 1598, when she was about eighteen years old, Lettice married Sir Robert Digby (1574 – 24 May 1618), a landed aristocrat of Coleshill, Warwickshire, whose brother was John Digby, 1st Earl of Bristol. The couple resided in Ireland where Sir Robert held the office of MP for Athy, County Kildare in 1613.

The marriage produced ten children:

- Mabel Digby, married firstly, Sir Gerald FitzGerald, Lord of Dromana and Decies, by whom she had issue; and secondly Donagh O'Brien
- Robert Digby, 1st Baron Digby (died 6 June 1642), married firstly Lady Sarah Boyle, by whom he had issue; and secondly Elizabeth Altham
- Essex Digby, Bishop of Dromore (died 12 May 1683), married firstly Thomasine Gilbert, by whom he had issue; and secondly Lettice Brereton, by whom he had issue
- George Digby
- Gerald Digby
- John Digby
- Simon Digby. MP for Philipstown
- Philip Digby, married Margaret Forth, daughter of Sir Ambrose Forth and widow of Thomas Moore of Croghan, County Offaly
- Lettice Digby, married Sir Roger Langford
- Abigail Digby, died as a child

== Digby v Earl of Kildare ==
Lettice and her husband were vigilant in asserting their legal rights, and they had a long-standing grievance over her exclusion from the Kildare inheritance. By 1602, they had gathered a considerable body of evidence that her grandfather's purported deed, which settled the property on his male heirs only, might have been forged or tampered with by her grandmother Mabel, Dowager Countess of Kildare, who was still alive. The Digbys filed suit against Mabel and against Lettice's cousin, the 14th Earl of Kildare, alleging that Lettice had been fraudulently deprived of her inheritance. Lord Kildare filed a counterclaim arguing, rather implausibly, that the action was a conspiracy between Lettice and Mabel to deprive him of his property.

Mabel admitted to altering the deed, but she put the entire blame on her barrister, Henry Burnell, who was censured for professional misconduct and fined. The lawsuit, which became quite celebrated, dragged on for over a decade, with hearings in several courts in London and Dublin. At one point the Lord Deputy of Ireland, Sir Arthur Chichester, complained that for two entire law terms the Court of Castle Chamber had been unable to deal with any other business, due to its preoccupation with the Kildare case (which it should probably not have heard at all, since in theory Castle Chamber dealt only with cases involving public security). The Digbys pursued the lawsuit with great determination: even after Kildare's death in 1612, the case continued against his widow and young son. Eventually, the parties were persuaded to settle their differences by arbitration.

== Baroness Offaly ==
As the daughter and only heiress of the eldest son of the 11th Earl of Kildare, the barony of Offaly had been claimed on her behalf when she was a child; in 1599, she assumed the title Baroness Offaly. Lettice has been described as having been an accomplished negotiator, and this skill paid off when finally, on 29 July 1620, after years of dispute, King James I granted her the suo jure title of 1st Baroness Offaly for life.

This was made under the Great Seal of England, and the King also invested her with the lands of Killeagh, and the territory and demesne of Geashill in King's County, Ireland. Geashill had been her dowry which she had brought into the Digby family upon her marriage. Her husband died in May 1618. On the same day of her investiture as Baroness Offaly, her eldest son Robert was made Baron Digby.

== Rebellion of 1641 ==
In 1641, the Great Irish Rebellion broke out. Lettice, by then a widow in her early sixties, became caught up in it at the end of 1641, when Lettice received a letter from her cousin, Henry O'Dempsey, Viscount Clanmalier, containing fraudulent orders from King Charles I to surrender Geashill Castle to the O'Dempseys, and leave with her people in a safe convoy provided by them. The letter continued with the threat to burn the castle and town, as well as to massacre all the Protestant inhabitants, should she fail to yield to their demands.

Lettice, who resided at the castle with her sons and some of her grandchildren, refused to hand over the castle, and sent a scornful letter back to Henry O'Dempsey:

"I am, as I have ever been, a loyal subject of my king. I thank you for your offer of a convoy, which however, I hold as of little safety. Being free from offending His Majesty, or doing wrong to any of you, I will live and die innocently, and will do my best to defend my own, leaving the issue to God".

In early 1642, the O'Dempseys made an assault on the castle, and more letters were exchanged, however, she and her people managed to hold out; she later refused to leave under the convoy of a relief party sent by Dublin, preferring to defend her fortress. When the rebels had captured one of her sons, and brought him under the castle walls in chains, they threatened to decapitate him if she did not immediately surrender Geashill. Lettice retaliated by bringing one of her own prisoners, a Catholic priest, onto the ramparts and threatened to kill him on the spot unless they released her son, unharmed. The rebels complied with her demand, and her son was returned to her.

Well-armed with weapons and ammunition from Dublin, Lettice kept the insurgents at bay until October 1642 when Lettice was finally persuaded to leave Geashill in the company of Sir Richard Grenville. She departed Ireland to retire to her late husband's family estate in Coleshill, England where she died in December 1658. She was buried alongside Sir Robert in Coleshill Parish Church.

She was not succeeded by her eldest grandson, Kildare Digby (c.1627- 1661) as the patent of the barony of Offaly stipulated that upon her death the title was to pass to the head of the House of Kildare who in 1658 was George FitzGerald, 16th Earl of Kildare.

Peerage of Ireland
New creation	Baroness Offaly; 1620–1658	Succeeded by George FitzGerald
