= William Steuart (British Army officer) =

British Army general

General The Right Honourable Sir William Steuart
- Born: 1643; Scotland
- Died: 4 June 1726 (aged 82–83); Hanover Square, London, Middlesex, England
- Military career
- Allegiance: Kingdom of Great Britain
- Branch: British Army
- Rank: General
- Commands: Queen Anne's Forces in Ireland
- Conflicts: Williamite War in Ireland

General Sir William Steuart (or Stewart; 1643 – 4 June 1726) was a Scottish-born soldier, Commander-in-chief of Queen Anne's Forces in Ireland, Member of Parliament for County Waterford and a Privy Counsellor. He was a benefactor of Hanover Square, London, donating the land and laying the first stone of St George's, Hanover Square.

== Biography ==
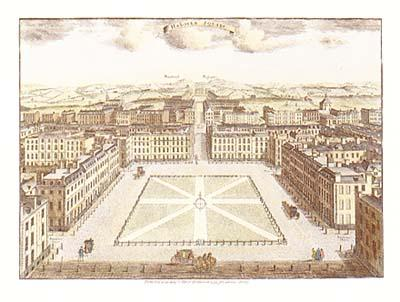
Steuart lived at Hanover Square, London.

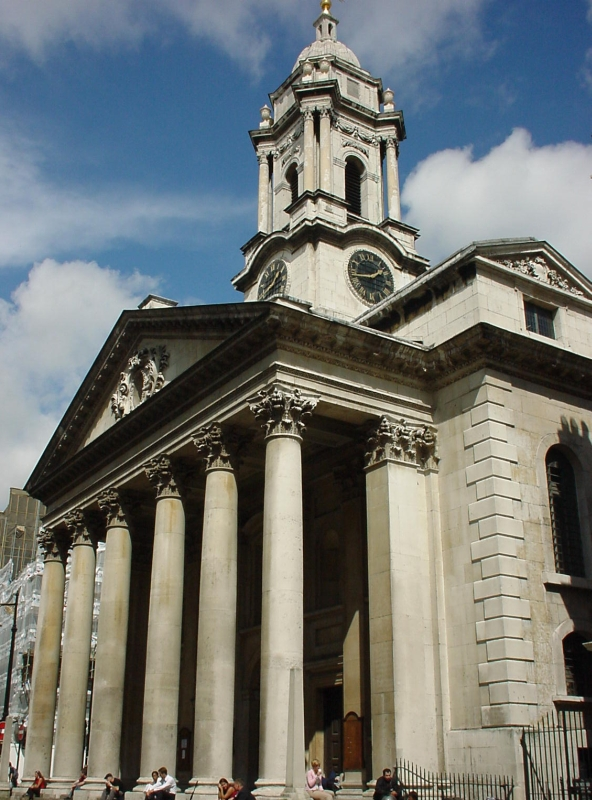
Steuart donated the land on which St George's Hanover Square was built, and laid the first stone in 1721.

Steuart was the second son of Colonel William Stewart (d.1691), adjutant to James Graham, 1st Marquess of Montrose at the Battle of Philiphaugh, by his wife Barbara, the granddaughter of James Stewart, Earl of Arran, the Lord Chancellor of Scotland. His paternal grandfather, William Stewart of Burray, lived at Mains, Wigtownshire, and was the elder brother of Alexander Stewart, 1st Earl of Galloway. Steuart himself was a first cousin of John Sinclair, 8th Earl of Caithness, and a nephew of Lt.-Col. Sir Archibald Stewart (d.1689), the first Baronet of Burray.

His father had been granted lands in Ireland by King Charles II in lieu of arrears of pay due to him as a Cavalier officer during the English Civil War, and it was there that William Steuart grew up. He joined the English Army and became a captain with the 1st Foot Guards before his promotion by William III of Orange to lieutenant-colonel of the 16th Foot. He was subsequently promoted to colonel of the 9th Regiment following the Glorious Revolution. Before Stewart took command, the regiment had taken part in aborted attempt to relieve the besieged city of Derry under another Colonel John Cunningham who was dismissed by King William for his failure. Stewart's regiment was re-embarked as part of General Percy Kirke's second relief force for Derry.

He served with distinction for the remainder of the Williamite War in Ireland against the Jacobite Irish Army. At the first Siege of Limerick (1690) he was badly wounded in the right hand, permanently disabling him was wounded again at Limerick and Athlone.

He was promoted to brigadier-general in 1694 and then to major-general in 1696. On Christmas Eve, 1700, he fought a duel with Colonel Bellew. Within two yards of his opponent, Steuart, with his left hand, shot Bellew through the hat. In return Bellew threw away his pistol saying that he did not desire to kill Steuart. By 1703 he was promoted to lieutenant-general. In 1711, in the absence of the Duke of Ormonde, Queen Anne appointed him commander-in-chief of her forces in Ireland. The same year he was made a full general and Privy Councillor. George I later removed him from his colonelcy of the 9th Foot, suspecting him of 'favouring the Chevalier'. He lived at Hanover Square, London and was a member of Parliament for County Waterford from 1703 to 1715. He owned considerable amounts of land in Ireland that after his death was distributed between his nephews and nieces, the children of his deceased brother, James.

General Steuart died 4 June 1726, and is buried with his first wife in the vault of the Duke of Buckingham at Westminster Abbey. In his will he left £5,000 to endow a school for the poor boys of his parish, St. George's, in London. He also donated the land on which St George's, Hanover Square was built, laying the first stone in 1721. The auctioneer Christopher Cock sold the house and its contents in Hanover Square, on 14 April 1730.

== Family ==
General Stewart was married twice: His first wife, The Rt. Hon. and Lady Katherine FitzGerald, Viscountess Grandison, was the widow of Brigadier-General Hon. Edward FitzGerald-Villiers (d.1693), the eldest son of George Villiers, 4th Viscount Grandison. She was the daughter and heiress of Sir John Fitzgerald of Dromana House (Villierstown), County Waterford, by his wife Katherine, second daughter of John Power (1599–1661), 5th Baron La Poer, and her guardians included Charles II of England. She died in December 1725. One month later Stewart married Eliza, daughter of Sir Rowland Alston (1654–1697), 2nd Bart., of Odell Castle, Bedfordshire, by his wife Temperance, daughter and heiress of Thomas Crew, 2nd Baron Crew. Neither wife bore him children.

After various charitable donations the bulk of the remainder of his will was divided between his brother and sister and the children of his elder brother, Captain James Steuart (d.1689), to whom he had acted as guardian. His nephews were: (1) Colonel John Steuart (d.1762) of Dublin, married Bridget Pocklington and inherited the General's land at Leighlinbridge, County Carlow, where his son, William (who married Anne, daughter of Sir Richard Butler, 5th Baronet), built Steuart/Stewart's Lodge in 1752; (2) Major Charles Stewart, who had a 'very considerable fortune of his own' bought Bailieborough Castle in 1724; and (3) James Steuart, Admiral of the Fleet, who was the executor of the General's will. Their fourth and eldest brother, (4) Brigadier-General The Hon. William Steuart (d.1736) of Ballylane, County Waterford, whose monument stands in Bath Abbey, was cut off with only a shilling.

== Bibliography ==
- Childs, John. The British Army of William III, 1689-1702. Manchester University Press, 1987.
