= William Walsh (bishop of Ossory, Ferns and Leighlin) =

19th-century Anglican priest and author

William Pakenham Walsh (4 May 1820 – 30 July 1902) was a 19th-century Anglican priest and author.

Born on 4 May 1820, he was educated at Trinity College Dublin and ordained in 1844. He held curacies at Ovoca and Rathdrum, after which he was the incumbent at Sandford, Dublin. In 1861 he held the Donnellan Lectures at Trinity College Dublin. From 1873 until 1878 he was Dean of Cashel and canon of Christ Church Cathedral. He was elected Bishop of Ossory, Ferns and Leighlin in 1878, and held the office until he retired in 1897. He died at Shankill, Dublin on 30 July 1902.

Walsh was the author of several works, including:

- Ancient Monuments and Holy Writ
- Heroes of the Mission Field
- Modern Heroes of the Mission Field
- The Decalogue of Charity
- The Voices of the Psalms

He married and had several children, including:

- Herbert Pakenham-Walsh (1871–1959), who was the inaugural Bishop of Assam.
- William Sandford Pakenham-Walsh, also a clergyman, who married in 1902 G. Maud Harmar.

== Notes ==
Religious titles
Preceded by Robert Samuel Gregg	Bishop of Ossory, Ferns and Leighlin; June 1878 –June 1897	Succeeded by John Baptist Crozier
