= Geashill =

Village in County Offaly, Ireland

Geashill Géisill (Irish)
- Village
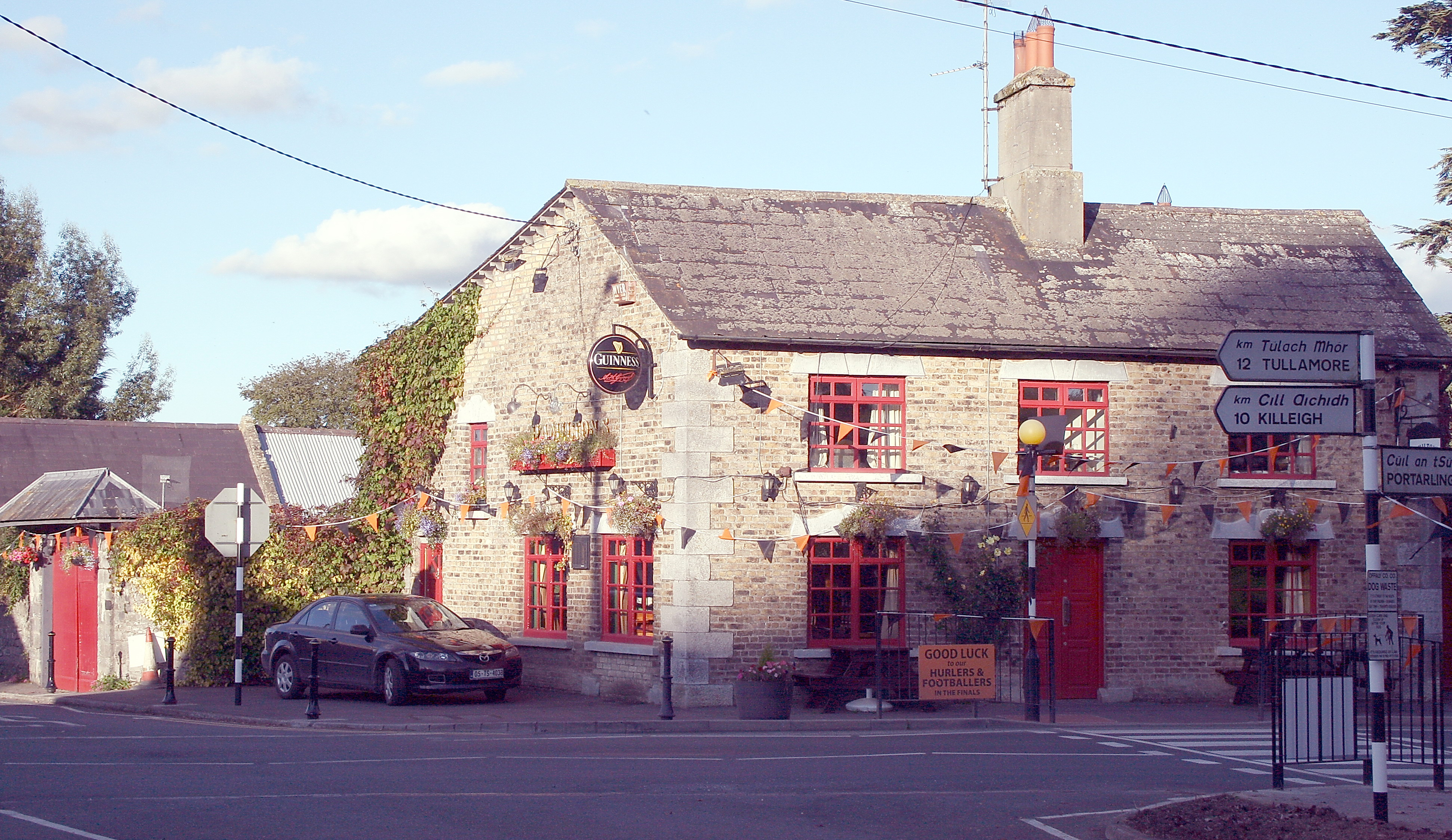
- Pub in Geashill

- Location in Ireland
- Coordinates: 53°14′13″N 7°19′19″W
- Country: Ireland
- Province: Leinster
- County: Offaly
- Elevation: 89 m (292 ft)

Population (2016)
  - Total: 395
- Time zone: UTC+0 (WET)
  - Summer (DST): UTC-1 (IST (WEST))
- Irish Grid Reference: N450206

Geashill /ˈɡiːʃəl/ (Irish: Géisill) is a village in County Offaly, Ireland. It is situated between the towns of Tullamore and Portarlington (each 12 km away), on the R420 road. The village has a Church of Ireland church, a shop and petrol station, a school, a GAA club, two public houses and a playground. Geashill was named "tidiest village" in the 2021 and 2023 Tidy Towns competitions. The village is in a townland and civil parish of the same name.

== History ==
The name Geashill is an anglicisation of the Irish name Géisill. Older anglicisations include Geashil, Geshill, Geshell, Geisshell and Gessill.

=== Medieval period ===
An ancient place named Brí Dam was situated in or near Geashill; it had its sacred tree (Old Irish: bile Brí Daim) that was mentioned in Lives of Saint Patrick. In 600 AD, Brí Dam was the place of death of king of Uisnech (according to some sources - King of Ireland) Suibne mac Colmáin, who was killed near an unidentified stream.

An Anglo-Norman settlement was built here between 1185 and 1204 by the first Lord of Offaly, Gerald Fitzmaurice Fitzgerald, an ancestor of the Earls of Kildare. Originally of motte-and-bailey design, it was a timber castle on an earthen mound, nearby were located the church and tenant dwellings. In the 15th century the wooded fortress was replaced by a stone tower house. Today, only the west wall of the castle remains.

In 1598, Lettice Digby, 1st Baroness Offaly, daughter and heir of Gerald, the Lord Offaly of the time, married a Robert Digby of Coleshill, Warwickshire, England, who was a brother of John Digby, 1st Earl of Bristol and whose son was created Robert Digby, 1st Baron Digby, of Geashill in the King's County, in 1620.

=== 19th century ===
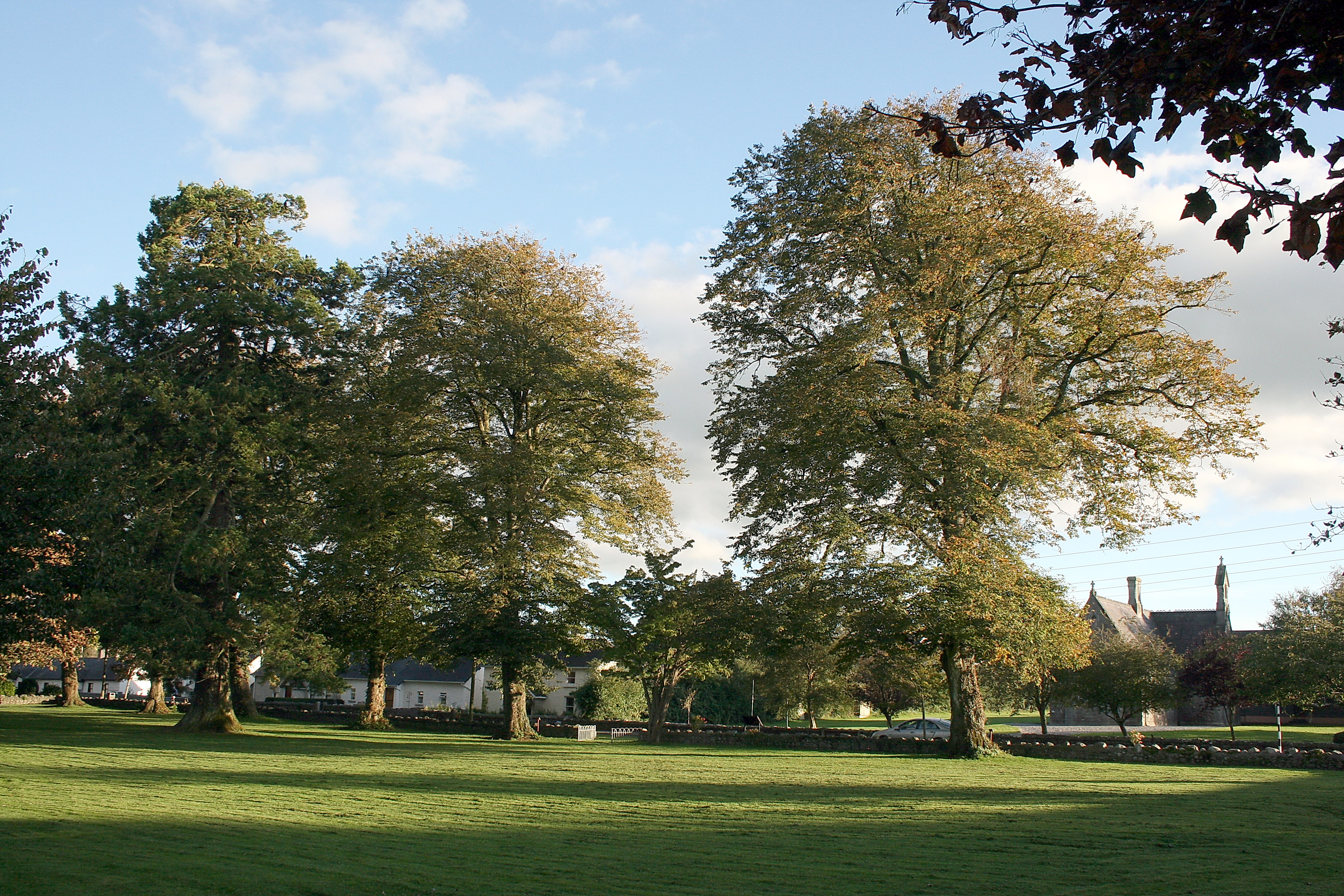
The triangular green in Geashill

The Digbys developed Geashill as a planned estate village. Samuel Lewis, writing in 1837, described the village as containing 87 mostly thatched houses arranged around a triangular green. Fairs were held on 1 May, 6 October and December, the latter being one of the largest pig markets in Ireland. Consisting of over 34,000 acres (140 km^{2}), the Digby estate was the largest in County Offaly.

Edward Digby, the 9th Baron Digby, came into the estate in 1856, but had no money to keep it. Consequently, he evicted a large number of families from their lands. A local priest, Father Patrick Dunne, arranged for 400 people to be taken to Australia on a ship named the Erin-go-Bragh, which took a record 25 weeks to reach Moreton Bay; 51 passengers died en route. Following the evictions, Lord Digby carried out extensive improvements in the 1860s and 1870s and many of the current buildings around the triangular green date from this time. The Kings County Directory recorded that Digby had "converted the village of Geashill into what it now is, one of the neatest, cleanest and best kept in Ireland".

At the Paris Exhibition of 1867, Lord Digby was awarded the bronze medal for models of the village he was building. He was awarded the gold medal for three years by the Royal Agricultural Society, for improving the greatest number of cottages in the best manner in the province of Leinster. The Digbys built a house called Geashill Castle near the medieval tower house, but this was burnt down during the Civil War in 1922.

== Transport ==
Geashill railway station opened on 2 October 1854, was closed for passenger traffic on 17 June 1963 and finally closed altogether on 30 August 1982.

There are several buses each day to Tullamore and Portarlington, and other local places.

== Sport ==
The local Gaelic Athletic Association club, Raheen GAA, won the Offaly Intermediate Football Championship in 1981 and 2014.
