= Dean of Cashel =

Church of Ireland official

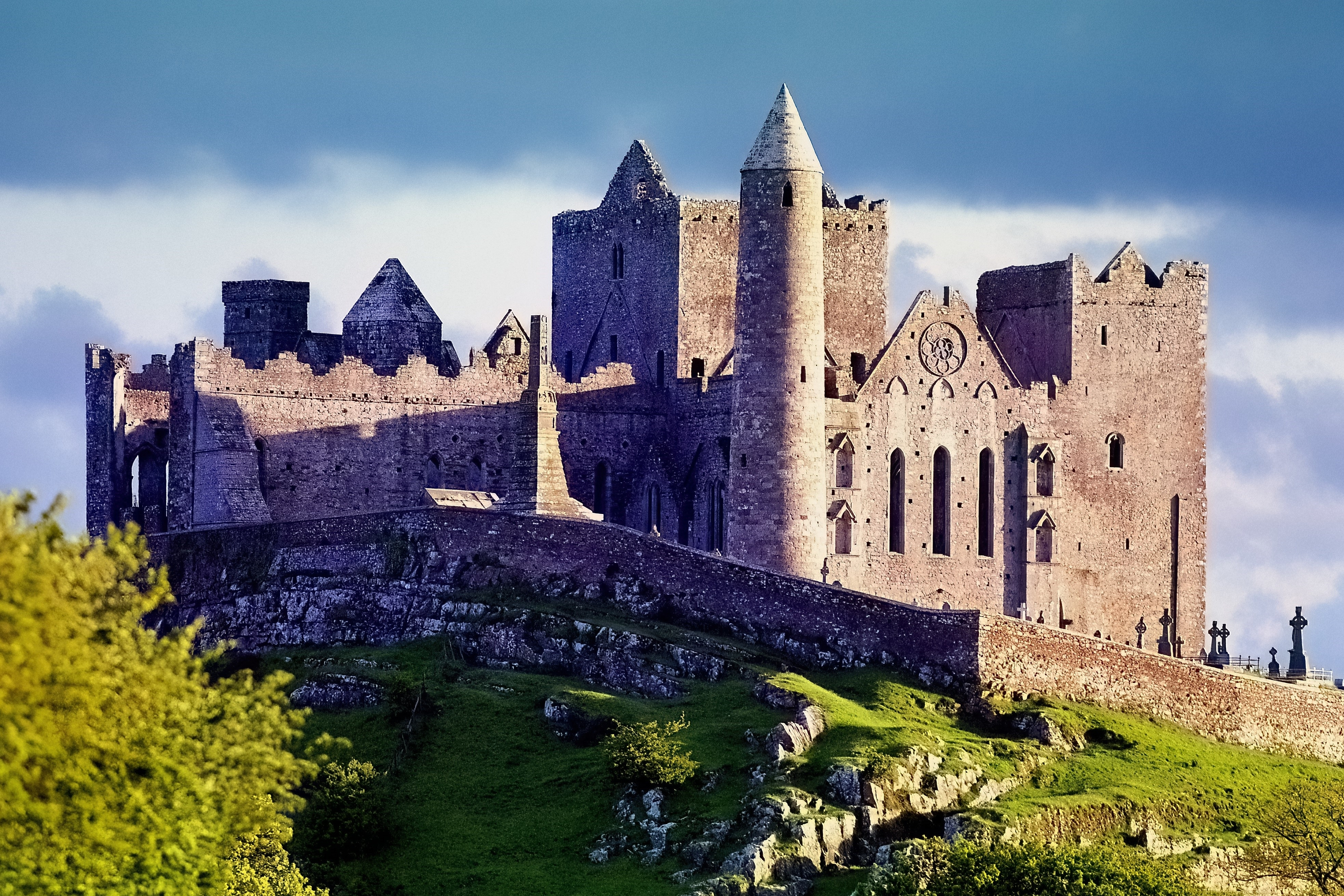
The historic cathedral of St Patrick, located at the Rock of Cashel.

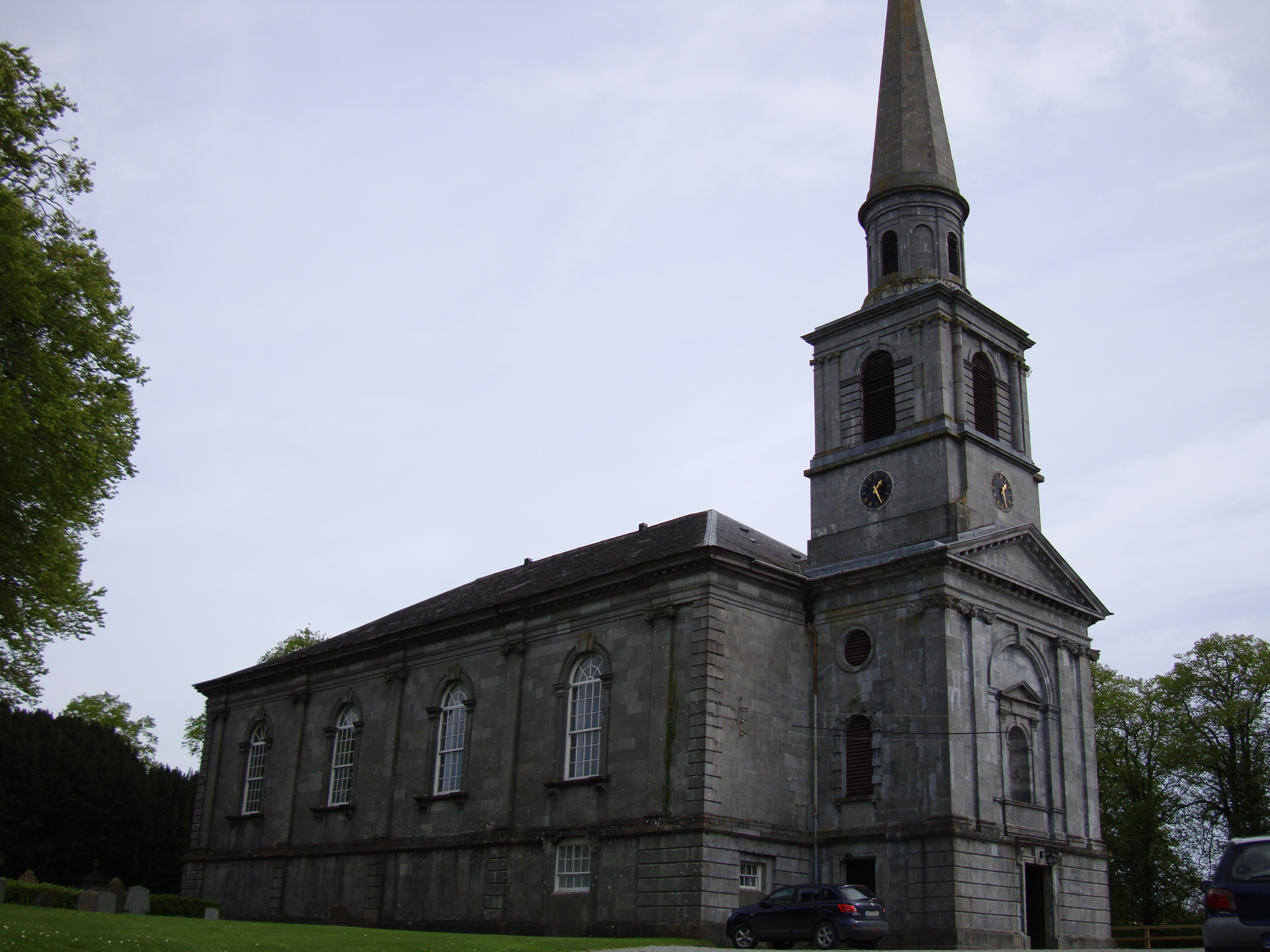
The present Church of Ireland cathedral of St John the Baptist and St Patrick's Rock, Cashel.

The Dean of Cashel is the head of the Chapter of the Cathedral Church of St John the Baptist and St Patrick's Rock, Cashel, one of the Church of Ireland cathedrals of the united Diocese of Cashel, Ferns and Ossory.

The Deanery is vacant.

It is not known when the Chapter of Cashel was established, but in 1224 Pope Honorius III confirmed twelve Canons and a Dean in the historic cathedral of St Patrick, located at the Rock of Cashel. For centuries the Chapter consisted of five dignitaries and six prebendaries, the Archbishop of Cashel being one, holding the prebend of Glankeen as parcel of his see. The prebend of Crohane was united to the archdeaconry of Cashel for more than 200 years.

Following the Reformation, the Church of Ireland retained the cathedral until it was closed for worship in 1721. Meanwhile, the old parish Church of St John in Cashel was removed and the present Georgian Cathedral completed in 1784.

The most recent dean, the Very Reverend Gerald G. Field, was instituted and installed in February 2014.

== List of deans of Cashel ==
=== Pre-Reformation ===
- c. 1224–1238: Thomas.
- before 1237–1238: David mac Cellaig Ó Gilla Pátraic, O.P. (afterwards Bishop of Cloyne, then Archbishop of Cashel).
- unknown–1253: David Mac Cerbaill, O.Cist. (afterwards Archbishop of Cashel); died 1289.
- 1254–unknown: Thaddeus O'Brien.
- 1260–unknown: Keran, or Kyran.
- 1267–unknown: Roland.
- c. 1269/72–1276: David.
- fl. 1282 and 1289: Antonius.
- 1302-1306: Philip Broder.
- 1346–unknown: Richard Fitzjohn.
- 1402–1412: Richard Barry.
- 1429–1437: David O'Dwyer.
- 1452–unknown: Cornelius.
- 1467–1485: John Hedian or O'Hedian.
- unknown–1558: Peter Butler.

=== Post-Reformation ===
- 1558/9–unknown: William Stapleton.
- unknown–1583/4: John McCody
- 1583/84–1605: Robert Coman
- 1605–1606: Dermot O'Meara (resigned)
- 1606–1607: John Todd (afterwards Bishop of Down and Connor and Bishop of Dromore).
- 1608–1633: Lewis Jones (also Dean of Ardagh and afterwards Bishop of Killaloe).
- 1633–1638: William Chappell (afterwards Bishop of Cork and Ross).
- 1638/9–unknown: Richard Howlett
- 1660/1–1670/1: Essex Digby (afterwards Bishop of Dromore).
- 1671–1675: Caesar Williamson
- 1676–1693/4: John Glandie
- 1693/4-1706: Henry Price
- 1706–1713: William Mullart
- 1714–1736: John Wetherby
- 1736–1758: William Gore (afterwards Bishop of Clonfert and Kilmacduagh).
- 1758–1769: Thomas Paul
- 1769–1787: John Jebb
- 1787–1829: Joseph Palmer
- 1829–1856: Samuel Adams
- 1857–1861: Ogle William Moore (afterwards Dean of Clogher, 1862)
- 1862–1873: John Cotter MacDonnell (later Canon Residentiary of Peterborough, 1883–1902)
- 1873–1878: William Pakenham Walsh (afterwards Bishop of Ossory, Ferns and Leighlin, 1878)
- 1878–1890: Arthur Henry Leech
- 1890–1908: George Purcell White
- 1908–1913: Maurice William Day (afterwards Dean of Waterford, 1913)
- 1913–1916: Robert Jones Sylvester Devenish
- 1916–1924: William Chadwick Bourchier
- 1924–1946: Joseph Talbot.
- 1946–1960: Robert Wyse Jackson (afterwards Bishop of Limerick, Ardfert and Aghadoe).
- 1961–1973: Charles Wolfe
- 1973–1983: David George Alexander Clarke (Prebendary of Newcastle, St Patrick's Dublin 1965–1989).
- 1984–1994: Gerald Mark David Woodworth
- 1995–2013: Philip John Knowles
- 2014–2021: Gerald G. Field
