= Hugh Gray (priest) =

Irish Anglican archdeacon (1921-2003)

Hugh Henry James Gray (1921 - 2003) was Archdeacon of Ossory and Leighlin from 1983 to 1992.

Gray was born in Cavan and received his education at Trinity College, Dublin. He was ordained in 1950 and began his ministry with a curacy in Enniscorthy. Following that, he held incumbencies at Fenagh and Clonenagh. He was Treasurer of Leighlin Cathedral from 1978 to 1980, and as its Chancellor from 1980 to 1983.

He retired in 1996 and died 2003.
