= Philip Mathews (priest) =

Philip Mathews was Archdeacon of Connor from 1689 to 1694.

Mathews was educated at Trinity College, Dublin. After his five years as Archdeacon he was then Precentor until his death in 1740.
