= Croghan, County Offaly =

Village in County Offaly, Ireland

Croghan Cruachán
- Village
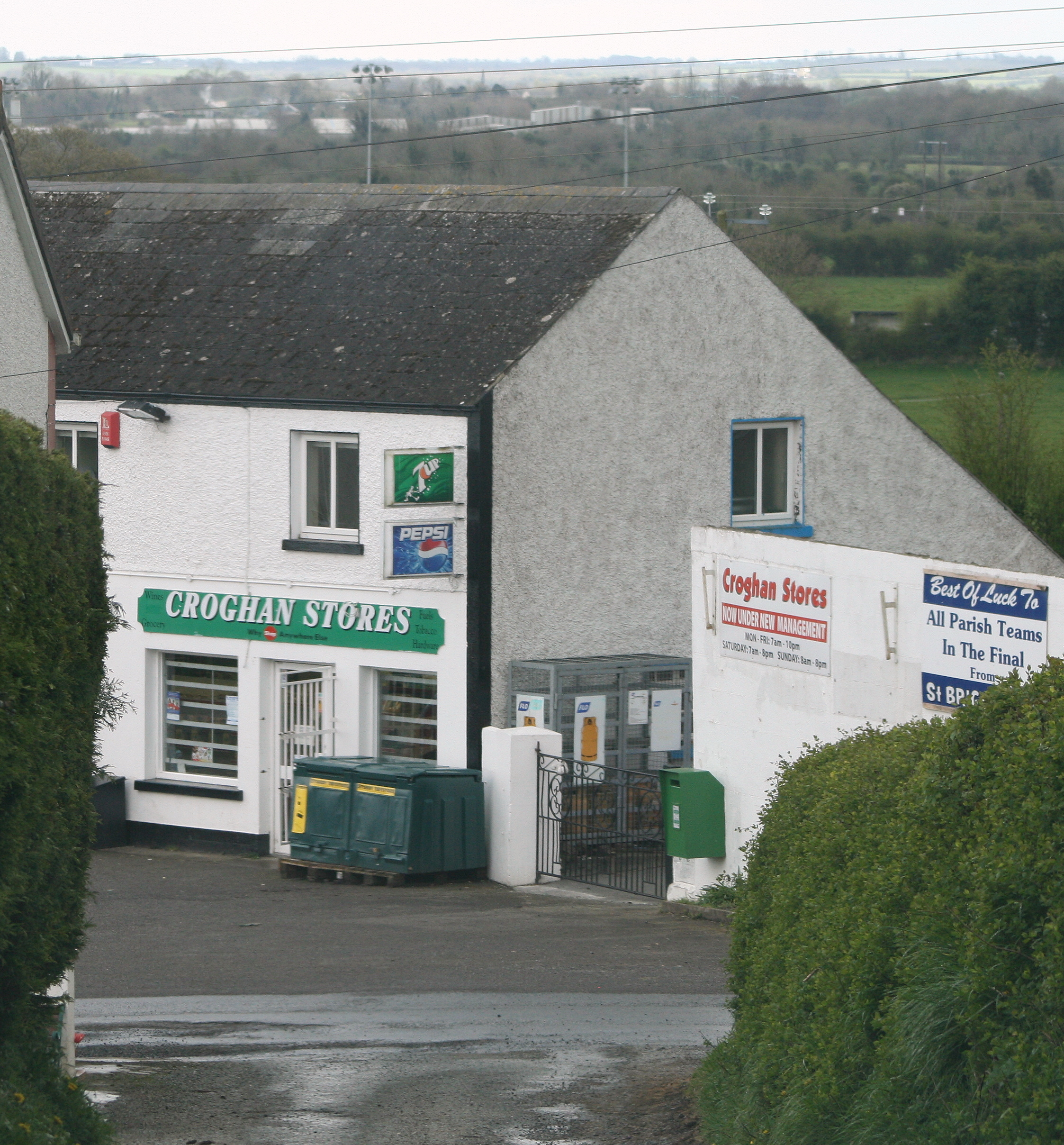
- Croghan village from Croghan Hill

- Location in Ireland
- Coordinates: 53°20′26″N 7°16′44″W
- Country: Ireland
- Province: Leinster
- County: Offaly
- Elevation: 110 m (360 ft)
- Time zone: UTC+0 (WET)
  - Summer (DST): UTC-1 (IST (WEST))
- Irish Grid Reference: N470331

Croghan (Irish: Cruachán) is a village in County Offaly in Ireland. It is situated near Croghan Hill, on an "island" of high ground surrounded by an expanse of raised bog which forms part of the Bog of Allen. The village is in a townland and civil parish of the same name.

== Sport ==
The local GAA club in Croghan is St Brigid's (Irish: Naomh Brid).

== School ==
St Brigid's National School, known in Irish as Scoil Bhride, was built in 1963. There were formerly a number of other schools in Croghan, including a hedge school which was run in Coole during the time of the Penal Laws by a Mr. Burke. The first official school opened in August 1835 in Cannakill. Croghan Community Centre was the local school until Scoil Bhríde was built. Due to the number of pupils then attending the new school, an extension was built in 2009. It included an assembly hall and other facilities and was officially opened and blessed by Bishop of Kildare and Leighlin, James Moriarty. As of 2014, the school had over 90 pupils enrolled.

== Croghan Hill ==
It is said that it is possible to see up to 9 counties from the summit of nearby Croghan Hill. On 17 March every year, St Patrick's Day, people climb the hill and set fire to the Furzes. The lighting of furzes is an age old tradition and it was believed that if you drove your cattle through the burning furzes it would ward off any diseases.

The Croghan Hill Challenge is an adventure race which takes place on the slopes of the hill, and has been used as a fundraiser for charities. Including in 2013, when over €60,000 was raised.

== Transport ==
Croghan is served by Bus Éireann route number 120, which provides 6 daily buses, Monday to Saturday, 2 buses on a Saturday and 1 bus on a Sunday. It serves the local towns of Tullamore and Edenderry and onwards to Dublin.

The village is 19 km by road from Tullamore.

== See also ==
- List of towns and villages in Ireland
