= St. John's Cathedral, Cashel =

The Cathedral Church of St. John the Baptist and St. Patrick's Rock, Cashel
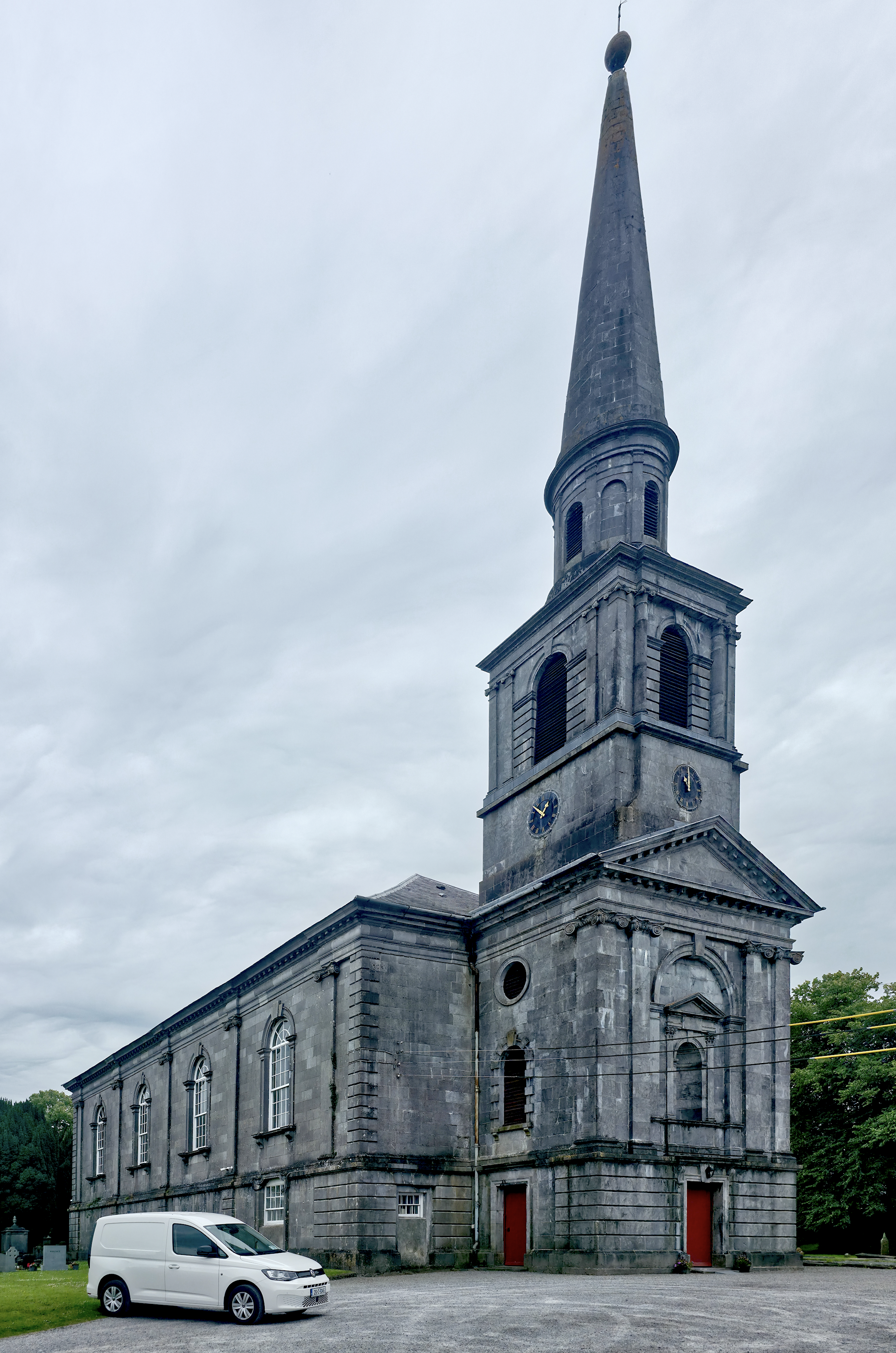
- The Cathedral Church of St. John the Baptist and St. Patrick's Rock, Cashel
- 52°30′55.49″N 07°53′8.31″W
- Location: John's St., Cashel, County Tipperary
- Country: Ireland
- Denomination: Church of Ireland
- Website: https://cashelunion.ie/

History
- Dedication: Saint John the Baptist and Saint Patrick's Rock

Architecture
- Architect: Oliver Grace
- Style: Georgian
- Completed: 1784

Administration
- Province: Province of Dublin & Cashel
- Diocese: United Dioceses of Cashel Ferns and Ossory

Clergy
- Bishop: Bishop of Cashel and Ossory
- Dean: The Very Reverend Gerald G. Field

The Cathedral Church of Saint John the Baptist and Saint Patrick's Rock is a cathedral of the Church of Ireland in Cashel, County Tipperary in Ireland. It is in the ecclesiastical province of Dublin.

Previously the cathedral of the Diocese of Cashel, it is now one of six cathedrals in the United Dioceses of Cashel Ferns and Ossory.

== Ecclesiastical history ==
The historic cathedral on the Rock of Cashel had been in the 1530s handed to the reformed Church of Ireland. This mediaeval cathedral was closed for worship by the Church of Ireland in 1721. Meanwhile, the old parish church of St John was removed and the present Georgian cathedral completed in 1784. Its famous Samuel Green organ was built in 1786, while Charles Agar was Archbishop, and the Chapter House was built to hold the Bolton Library.

== See also ==
- Dean of Cashel
- Thurles Cathedral for the cathedral of the Roman Catholic Archdiocese of Casel and Emly
