= Hugh O'Donnell, 2nd Earl of Tyrconnell =

Irish-Spanish soldier (1606–1642)

The Earl of Tyrconnell
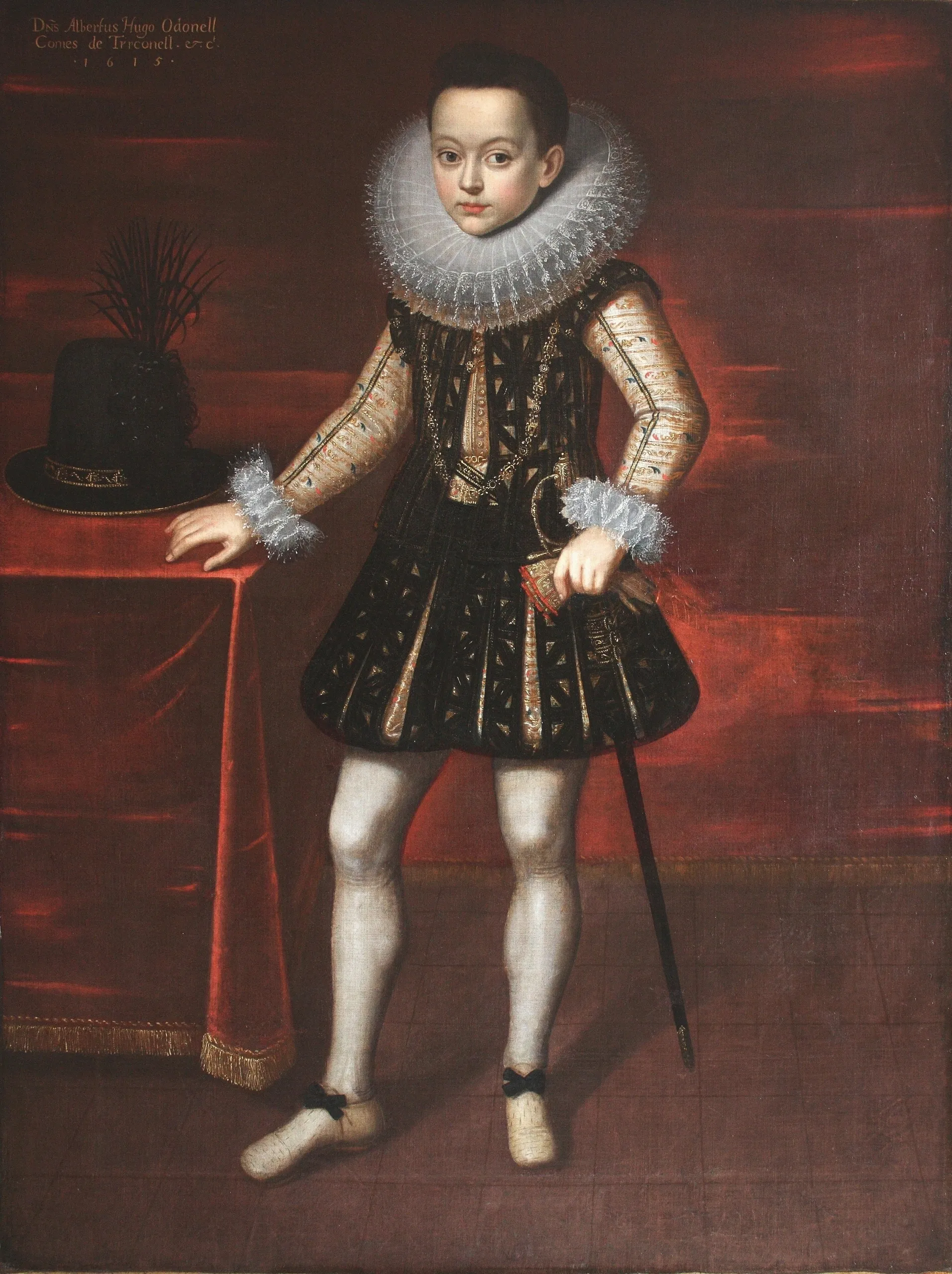
- O'Donnell at Albert VII's court, 1615, by Peter Paul Rubens or his workshop

Earl of Tyrconnell
- Tenure: 28 July 1608 – 7 November 1614
- Predecessor: Rory O'Donnell, 1st Earl of Tyrconnell
- Successor: Attainted in 1614
- Other titles: Baron of Donegal
- Born: Hugh O'Donnell c. October 1606; County Kildare, Ireland
- Died: 1 July 1642 (aged 35); Off the coast of Catalonia, Crown of Aragon
- Spouse: Anna-Margaret de Hénin (m. 1632; died 1634)
- Father: Rory O'Donnell, 1st Earl of Tyrconnell
- Mother: Bridget FitzGerald

Colonel Hugh Albert O'Donnell, 2nd Earl of Tyrconnell (Note: Irish: Aodh Ailbhe mac Rudhraighe Ó Domhnaill; Spanish: Albertus Hugo Odonnell) (Note: He was also styled Hugh-Albert or Albert-Hugh O'Donnell. He became known as Alberto.) (c. October 1606 – 1 July 1642), was an Irish-Spanish nobleman who served in the Spanish military. The only son of Rory O'Donnell, 1st Earl of Tyrconnell, he was eleven months old when he participated in the Flight of the Earls, leaving Ireland never to return. He was naturalised as a Spanish subject in 1633 and fought in the Thirty Years' War.

After O'Donnell's extended family settled in Catholic Europe, he was raised at St Anthony's College in the Spanish Netherlands. He assumed the name Albert for his confirmation in honour of Albert VII, Archduke of Austria, and was a page to Isabella Clara Eugenia. As O'Donnell matured, he took on a leadership role amongst his family of Irish refugees. He began a military career; in 1625 he was made a captain of a company of Spanish cavalry, and in 1632 he was made colonel of the second Irish regiment (tercio) in the Spanish army.

For much of O'Donnell's career, he had a professional rivalry with fellow Irish noble-turned-soldier Shane O'Neill, 3rd Earl of Tyrone. O'Donnell was a key supporter of a proposed Spanish invasion of Ireland in 1627, but the invasion plans fell apart. His duties to Spain also prevented him from participating in the Irish Rebellion of 1641. He died in July 1642 when his ship, the Magdalena, was attacked and sunk by French forces off the coast of Catalonia.

In addition to the earldom, O'Donnell held the title Baron of Donegal from birth. Both titles were attainted in 1614 but he continued to use them throughout his life. O'Donnell was a nephew of Hugh Roe O'Donnell, the last undisputed chief of the O'Donnell clan.

== Family background ==
The only son of Rory O'Donnell, 1st Earl of Tyrconnell, and his wife Bridget FitzGerald, Hugh O'Donnell was born around October 1606, either at Kildare Castle or in his mother's home at Maynooth. His paternal grandparents were Hugh McManus O'Donnell, a Gaelic Irish chieftain in Ulster, and Scottish noblewoman Fiona "Iníon Dubh" MacDonald. (Note: Through Iníon Dubh, he was a descendant of King of Scots Robert the Bruce via Robert II.) His maternal grandparents were Henry FitzGerald, 12th Earl of Kildare, an Irish peer of Hiberno-Norman descent, and English noblewoman Frances Howard.

O'Donnell's paternal family were the O'Donnell clan of Tyrconnell, who claimed descent, via Conall Gulban of the Cenél Conaill, from High King Niall of the Nine Hostages. Rory's branch of the O'Donnell clan had ruled Tyrconnell since 1566. Rory fought against the English Crown during the Nine Years' War (1593–1603). He surrendered in 1603 and managed to secure favour with King James VI and I, though he was required to renounce his Gaelic titles. On 7 October [O.S. 27 September] 1603, Rory was created Baron of Donegal and 1st Earl of Tyrconnell, with the title Baron of Donegal to his heirs apparent. Thus, O'Donnell became Baron of Donegal upon his birth.

O'Donnell was fostered by the O'Gallagher family in his youth. Specifically, his foster-parents were his wet nurse Caecilia O'Gallagher and her husband Hugh, who were clients of the O'Donnell clan. The O'Gallaghers fostered O'Donnell for at least a year prior to the Flight of the Earls.

== Upbringing and education ==
=== Flight of the Earls ===
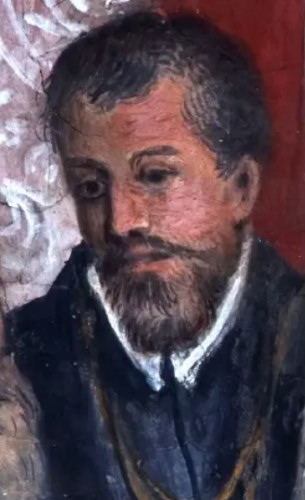
O'Donnell's father, Rory O'Donnell, 1st Earl of Tyrconnell, accompanied him to Catholic Europe in the Flight of the Earls.

On 14 September 1607, due to increasing hostility from the government, Rory and his wartime ally Hugh O'Neill, Earl of Tyrone, fled from Ireland along with about ninety of their followers. O'Donnell, aged about eleven months, accompanied his father on the flight. He was accompanied by Caecilia and two criadas. Additionally, O'Donnell's uncle Cathbarr and aunt Rosa were on the flight, with their two-year-old son also named Hugh O'Donnell. In the haste to depart, O'Donnell's mother Bridget was left behind in Maynooth. Bridget was pregnant at the time; a few months after the flight, she gave birth to O'Donnell's younger sister Mary Stuart O'Donnell.

The refugees hoped to reach Spain, but were turned away due to Philip III's fears of violating the Treaty of London. Thus the refugees spent the winter in Leuven in the Spanish Netherlands. Arrangements were made for the lodging and safe-keeping of O'Donnell, his cousin Hugh, and the O'Gallaghers' son. The O'Gallaghers had "lost all their possessions to come [to Flanders]", and they maintained O'Donnell for "a full year and six months" at their own expense.

=== Fosterage in Leuven ===
Rory was clearly concerned for his son's safety, as he gave Fr. Donagh Mooney (Superior of the Irish Franciscans in Leuven) a commission to exercise supervision over young O'Donnell. Dr. Fienus (First Professor of Medicine at the College) suggested nurse Anna ny Madden (Note: Anna ny Madden did not participate in the Flight of the Earls. She was apparently of noble birth.) as a replacement for Caecilia. With Rory's approval, Anna ny Madden supplanted Caecilia in February 1608, and O'Donnell was given to the Convent of the Dames Blanches in Leuven. This was after Rory and Tyrone left Leuven to continue their journey to Rome. O'Donnell's cousin Hugh, and Tyrone's sons Shane and Brian were also left in Leuven.

The O'Gallaghers were devastated by this development, reminding officials that they were O'Donnell's legal fosterers. They condemned Madden for her "slovenness and unpleasantness", and accused her for only caring about the well-being of her own child and her spouse Dennis O'Kelly. Hugh O'Gallagher questioned how a stranger could teach O'Donnell the Irish language ("his mother tongue") and he asserted that Caecilia should remain with O'Donnell at the convent as his rightful nurse. The O'Gallaghers bemoaned that they had "no other consolation except this child, or means of support, or income", and lamented to Albert VII, Archduke of Austria and sovereign of the Netherlands, that they "had nothing to eat except what your Highness with your wanted kindness is pleased to grant". These desperate solicitations and pleas only alienated their correspondents.

O'Donnell became 2nd Earl of Tyrconnell after his father's death in Rome from a fever on 28 July 1608. His uncle Cathbarr similarly died of fever in September. Following Rory and Cathbarr's deaths, Tyrone unsuccessfully petitioned for Nuala (Rory's sister) and Rosa to be relocated back to the Spanish Netherlands to allow them to look after the O'Donnell cousins. For the next two years, Rosa and Nuala repeatedly petitioned the Spanish government to allow them to reunite with their nephews in Flanders.

In December 1608, O'Donnell was placed under the care of nuns and received into the monastery. On 25 January 1610, the Prioress of the Dames Blanches asked Albert VII for O'Donnell's pension to be increased. This request was granted. The Prioress wrote to Lodewijk Verreycken on 20 February, referencing complaints made to Isabella Clara Eugenia about the way O'Donnell, his cousin Hugh and Caecilia's son were dressed: "Sir, we are very much surprised at certain complaints which have been made to Her Highness, that we do not dress these young Princes as their state demands. As we dress them in ermine and velvet, it seems to us that this should be quite satisfactory". Around this time, both O'Donnell cousins suffered from a serious illness, which required one of them to be operated on. Fr. Hugh MacCaughwell and Colonel Henry O'Neill attempted to have the O'Gallaghers reinstated as O'Donnell's foster-parents, but this was blocked by the nuns.

=== St Anthony's College ===
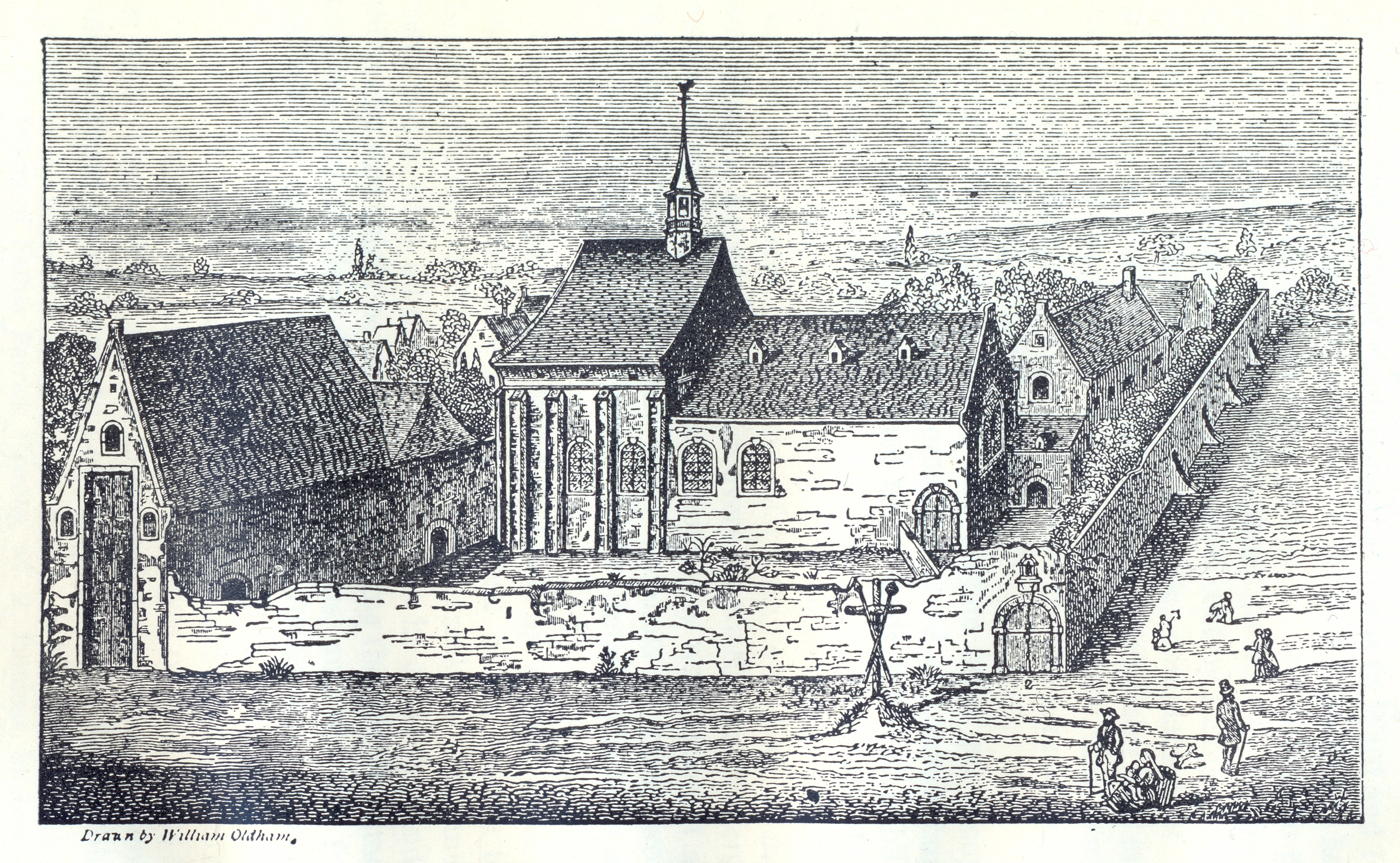
O'Donnell was raised and educated at St Anthony's College in Leuven.

The two boys remained in the care of their nurses at the convent until 8 October 1610, when O'Donnell and his cousin Hugh (along with Shane and Brian) were ordered by Albert VII to be given over to MacCaughwell, who was the Franciscan superior of St Anthony's College. On 12 October, MacCaughwell reported that the nuns refused to hand the children over. The nuns complained that the Irish College was "the most unhealthy in Leuven", and they wrote that the four-year-old O'Donnell screamed and bled from the nose when told that he had to leave them. On 15 October, peremptory orders were sent to forthwith send O'Donnell to St. Anthony's College. The four young nobles (O'Donnell, cousin Hugh, Shane and Brian) were raised and educated at the college. O'Donnell received a monthly grant of 1000 crowns from the government.

On 26 August 1610, Philip III finally granted Nuala permission to go to Leuven. She arrived in the Lowlands in mid-December 1611. On 20 June 1612, ambassador Castro informed Philip III that he could not dissuade Rosa and that she too was travelling to the Low Countries. After Nuala and Rosa were reunited with their nephews, they settled at Leuven and oversaw the upbringing of the O'Donnell cousins.

Around 1614, (Note: Francis Martin O'Donnell states that the meeting was in 1613. Casway states it was in March 1614. Jennings dates it "just before the holding of the Irish Parliament, 1613-1615".) Nuala secretly met with English ambassador William Trumbull. Nuala pledged her loyalty to King James and offered to withdraw O'Donnell from Flanders, if James would pardon the refugees and return Tyrconnell's lands to O'Donnell. Trumbull gave no guarantee of the king's favour and suggested Nuala and O'Donnell travel to England to plead the king in person. Unfortunately for Nuala, she could not be granted safe passage back to the British Isles, thus her proposals were in vain. Trumbull apparently attempted to bring O'Donnell back to Ireland, to be educated in the English manner, but this was blocked by Nuala. During this time, the Crown was sending the sons of Gaelic Irish lords to Dublin or England to be re-educated as English gentlemen. The title Earl of Tyrconnell was attainted by the Irish Parliament on 7 November [O.S. 28 October] 1614.

=== At the royal court ===
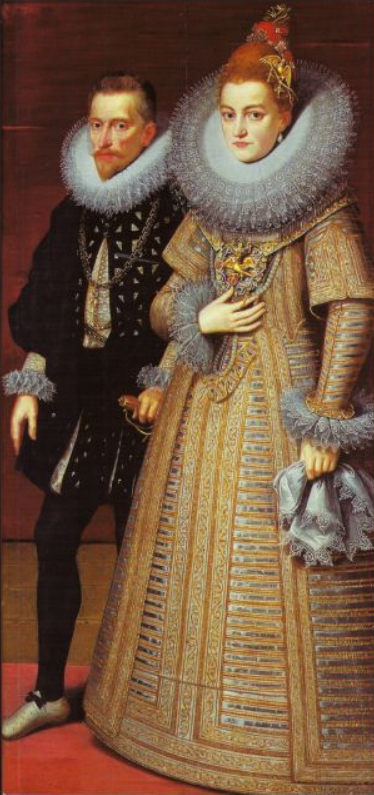
Albert VII and Isabella Clara Eugenia, sovereigns of the Habsburg Netherlands

From 1615, O'Donnell and his cousin Hugh were in the receipt of a modest pension from Albert VII. As both boys were called Hugh, O'Donnell assumed the name Albert for his confirmation, in honour of Albert VII, who was O'Donnell's sponsor at his confirmation. Hugh Albert O'Donnell was attached to the court of the Infanta Isabella as a page, and it was during this time that his portrait was painted, by either Peter Paul Rubens or his workshop. This portrait is the only authentic and contemporary portrait of the last regnant O'Donnell dynasty of Tyrconnell. (Note: O'Donnell's father Rory was depicted in a fresco in the Vatican dated circa 1610, though Rory himself died in 1608.)

O'Donnell had probably already left the college by the start of 1617. He petitioned Albert VII for an increase in pension, asking that it should be made the same as his late father's pension. An increase of fifty crowns monthly was granted on 24 August 1618. He also petitioned Isabella that he might be transferred to the service of the Prince in Spain, but by May 1619 this had not been granted. Albert VII brought this matter to Philip III but it was ignored. In autumn 1621, O'Donnell was enrolled as a student at St Anthony's College.

Philip III died in March 1621 and was succeeded by his son Philip IV. O'Donnell once again petitioned for a further increase in his pension so that his pay would be equal to Shane's pay. On 8 November 1622, Albert VII recommended to the king that O'Donnell's monthly pension should be increased by 50 crowns, also in view of the services of O'Donnell's late father. O'Donnell was thereafter attached to Albert VII's court at Brussels. In 1623, O'Donnell wrote: "...I do not consider myself inferior in rank, services and obligations to the Counts of Tiron... and only His Majesty is powerful enough to overshadow my house and no one lower than a king in Ireland, Scotland or England..."

== Career ==
=== Rise in influence ===
On 26 June 1623, O'Donnell was granted permission to travel to Spain for six months "on business of great importance". Although no documentation exists of his visit, it is assumed he spent this time in Spain. On 6 August, this grant was renewed for three more years. O'Donnell's cousin Hugh joined the first Irish regiment (tercio) in the Spanish army—which was then coloneled by Shane, now 3rd Earl of Tyrone—as a captain. Cousin Hugh died in early 1625 in the Siege of Breda.

As O'Donnell matured, he took over the role of leader of the O'Donnell exiles from his aunt Nuala. She eventually became O'Donnell's dependent and needed his consent for her monthly pension's distribution. O'Donnell's importance as head of the O'Donnell refugees meant that he did not serve in the Irish regiment. Philip IV proposed to Isabella the formation of a second Irish regiment, to be commanded by O'Donnell, which could be formed by disbanding the English and Scottish soldiers in Spanish service. Isabella remarked that it was difficult enough to recruit sufficient Irish soldiers for one recruitment. The king insisted that, even if a regiment could not be raised for O'Donnell, his pension should at least be paid promptly, "as there are many reasons why this gentlemen should be kept occupied and satisfied". O'Donnell left the royal court in September 1625.

In May 1625, O'Donnell was made a Knight Commander of the Order of Alcántara. In November he was made captain of a company of Spanish Mounted Cuirassiers. He would retain his pension in addition to his pay as captain. On 8 September 1626, Philip IV instructed that O'Donnell was to be given a company of Irish infantry. Isabella objected, citing O'Donnell's lack of experience and inability to command two companies; Philip IV ultimately agreed.

O'Donnell took the title of earl, or count, on the continent, and was in favour at the Spanish court. As an adult, O'Donnell styled himself Earl of Tyrconnell and Donegal, Baron of Lifford, Lord of Sligo and Lower Connaught. (Note: The title Baron of Lifford was offered to Rory's cousin Niall Garve O'Donnell as part of the Irish peerage, but he refused. In 1595, Rory's elder brother Hugh Roe, last undisputed chief of the O'Donnell clan, claimed sovereignty over Sligo and Lower Connacht.) These titles are recorded in a document dated 3 November 1626. Had the earldom of Tyrconnell not been attainted, O'Donnell's title would have had an annual value of 600,000 gold florins.

O'Donnell's company of Horse was ordered into garrison at Sichem, where it seemingly stayed until April 1630. Many of O'Donnell's junior officers resented his presence and raised difficulties about obeying him, possibly because he was a foreigner commanding a Spanish company. On 31 October 1630, orders were issued that all Cavalry Captains of the Light Horse, regardless of birth, nation, or condition, were to respect O'Donnell's rights of precedence.

=== Planned Armada and Mary Stuart O'Donnell ===
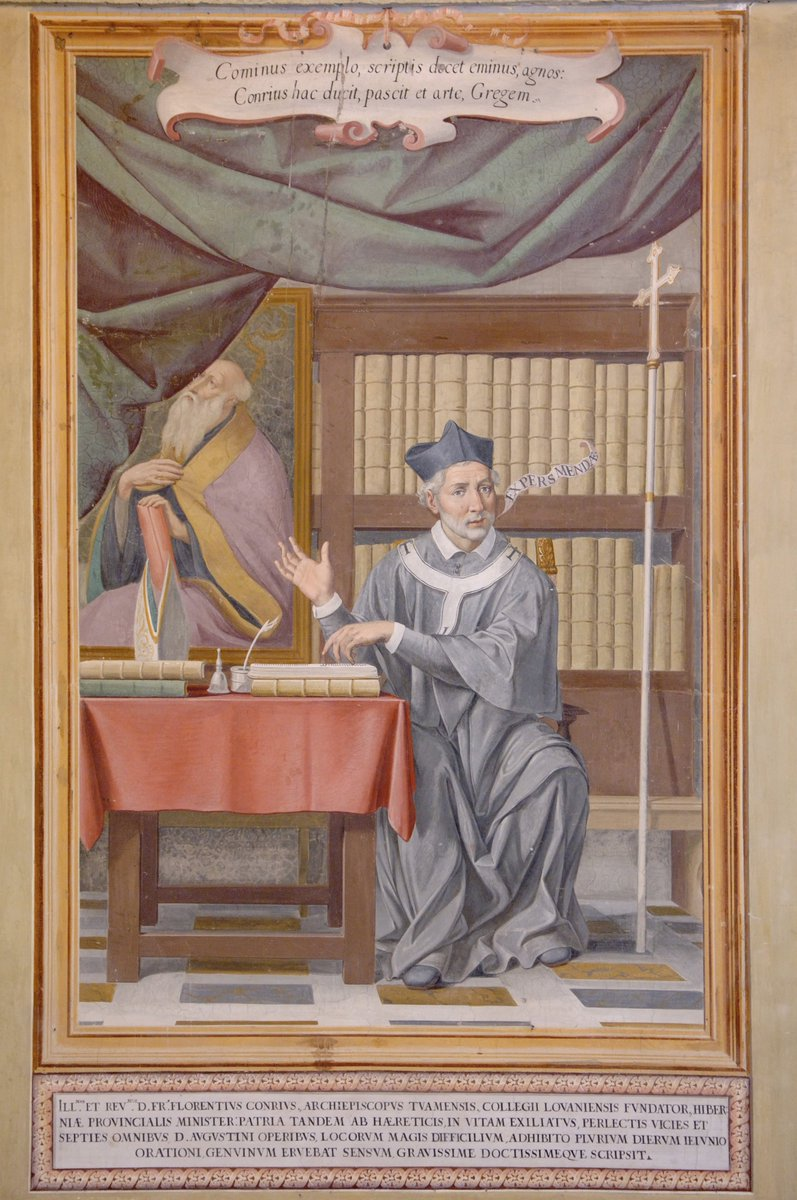
Catholic Archbishop Florence Conroy proposed a Spanish invasion of Ireland, to be led by O'Donnell.

Conflict between Spain and England was revived with the Anglo-Spanish War of 1625 to 1630. Irishmen living on the Continent pressured the Spanish government to use this conflict to liberate Ireland from English control. In 1626, Conry and Owen Roe O'Neill went to Madrid to discuss plans for a Spanish expedition to Ireland with Philip IV. They proposed that the expedition should be led by O'Donnell and Shane as generals of equal footing to contend with the serious rivalry and jealousy between them. It was suggested that half of Shane's regiment could be assigned to O'Donnell. It was also proposed, with the approval of Philip IV, that an Irish republic should be established rather than a new monarchy, to avoid conflict between the earls over who had the right to the throne of Ireland. The Infanta wrote "the earls should be called Captains General of the said republic and... one could exercise his office on land and the other at sea".

In summer 1626, O'Donnell's younger sister Mary broke into a London prison and freed two Irishmen. She subsequently fled from the British Isles. In 1627, Mary arrived in Brussels and met O'Donnell there for the first time. Through his influence, she was received by Isabella's court. Conroy proposed an arranged marriage between Shane and Mary to reduce tension and unify the noble families.

A fleet of 11 ships had been prepared at Dunkirk by March 1627, anticipated to sail to Killybegs in September. However, the invasion plan was marred by various disagreements. The Spanish government was reticent to be publicly associated with the invasion. O'Donnell and O'Neill also argued over their roles as joint commanders. Although O'Donnell was seven years younger than O'Neill, he again maintained that he was equally entitled to command an Irish regiment. The authorities in Brussels wished for O'Neill to take sole command of the expedition, while authorities in Madrid favoured O'Donnell (probably because Conroy remained there as an advisor). Conroy's hope for a marriage to unify the feuding families came to naught, as Mary was secretly in a relationship with an Irish captain named Dudley O'Gallagher, who had accompanied her to the Continent; she rejected the marriage.

The plans were ultimately abandoned—the Spanish Council of State announced that Philip IV wished "only to preserve what he has" rather than acquiring more territory in Ireland. Conry died in Madrid in 1629. Despite an English expedition against Cádiz in 1625, the Anglo-Spanish conflict did not develop into full-scale war. Around 1629, Mary became pregnant and her relationship with O'Gallagher was exposed. The disgraced couple fled from Brussels to Italy. O'Donnell was upset and claimed that Mary was an imposter pretending to be his sister and attempting to defame his family.

=== Military experience ===
O'Donnell was commissioned colonel of his own Irish regiment (tercio) in January 1632, which slighted O'Neill. O'Donnell's regiment was to consist of fifteen banners, and would have equal footing with the Spanish regiments. In his commission, dated 13 January, his qualifications are referenced; he was Captain of Spanish Lancers for five years and distinguished himself during the campaign for the relief of Bois-le-Duc and for the entry into Veluwe. Additionally, the previous year he had repelled the Frederick Henry, Prince of Orange's forces near Bruges.

By 1632, O'Donnell's annual pension was 1,800 crowns. As a Knight of Alcántara he had 3,000 crowns yearly. Additionally was his pay as a colonel. O'Donnell was granted naturalisation as a Spanish subject in 1633. In January 1635, rumours reached Philip IV that the French were attempting to lure O'Donnell and O'Neill to work for their own military. It is possible that O'Donnell could have been facing financial problems, as on 7 April he complained that he was owed 26,280 crowns.

Philip IV recognised the need to not appear to choose favourites between O'Neill and O'Donnell's houses. He wrote: "Examine what can be done with the Count of Tyrconnell considering that both of them are coming to serve in my household; from what my brother has written to me I do not know how the matter may be adjusted evenly. In August 1638, by royal decree, the Earls of Tyrone and Tyrconnell were granted a payment of four thousand escudos for their unpaid service in Flanders, in addition to two thousand escudos from army funds to support their continued service.

In 1638, the Irish regiments commanded by O'Neill and O'Donnell were transferred from the Army of Flanders to the Basque Country to bolster forces on the northern coast in the face of an expected French invasion. With 1,200 men, the two Irish regiments comprised roughly 10% of the Peninsular force. A French army of 22,000, led by the Prince of Condé and the Due de la Valette, had begun besieging Fuenterrabía in July. A small garrison of five companies had been holding out for two months when a relief force of 12,000 Spanish soldiers reached the town in early September. O'Donnell and his regiment were among those in the relief force, and the French were quickly routed. Both Irish regiments distinguished themselves at Fuenterrabía.

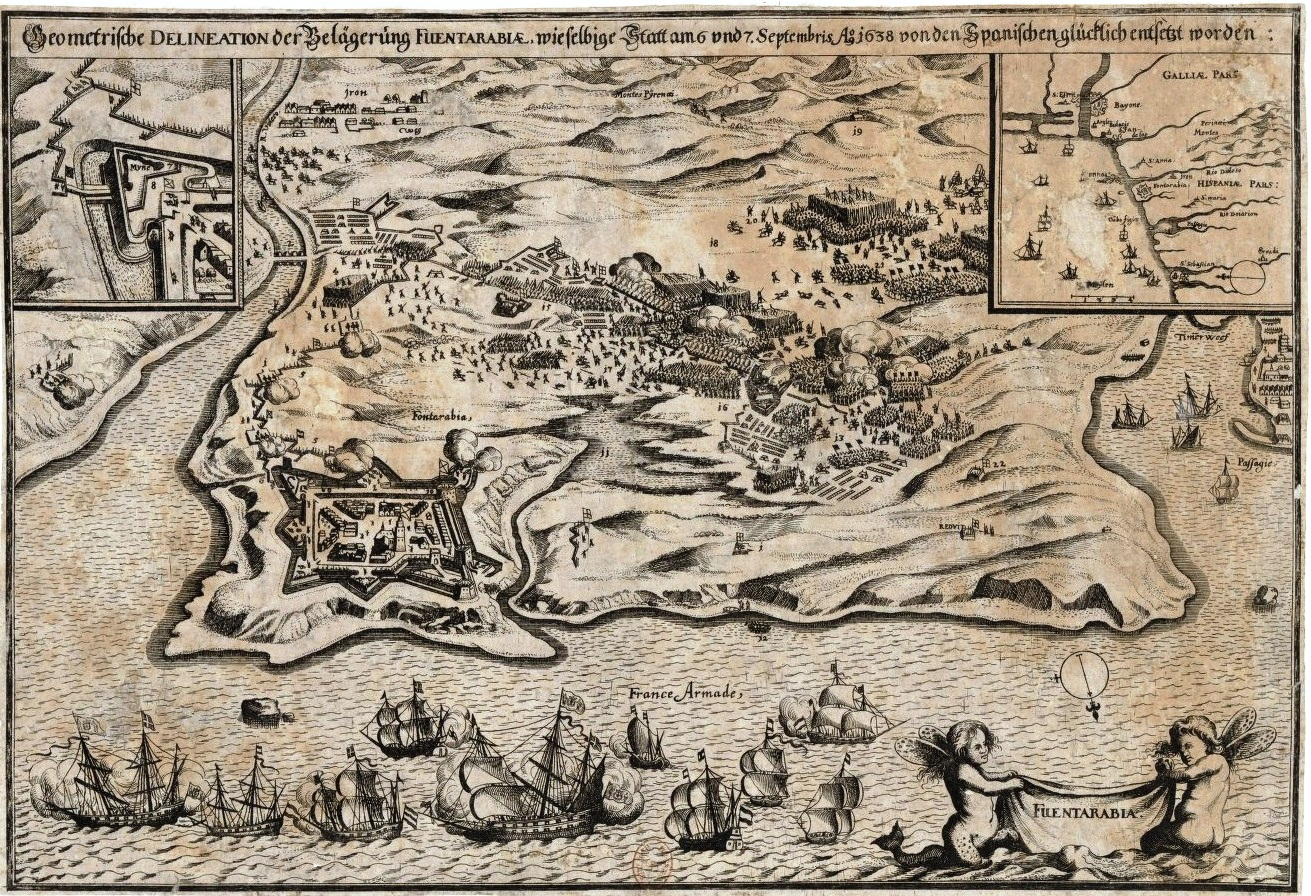
Contemporary etching depicting the siege of Fuenterrabía, where O'Donnell distinguished himself.

It was expected that O'Donnell would assist in the Irish Rebellion of 1641. His military rank and experience, coupled with his claim as a descendant of the Gaelic nobility and his association with Celtic prophecies, (Note: During the early Nine Years' War, O'Donnell's uncle Hugh Roe was associated with the Aodh Engeach prophecy, which alleged that if two men named Hugh succeeded each other as O'Donnell chief, the last Hugh shall "be a monarch in Ireland and quite banish thence all foreign nations and conquerors". O'Donnell's cousin Hugh became associated with the same prophecy. O'Donnell's designated heir, Hugh Balldearg O'Donnell, was associated with a prophecy which proclaimed that an O'Donnell with a red mark would save Ireland.) contributed to expectations that O'Donnell would have the potential to retake Ireland from English rule. O'Donnell requested permission from the Spanish court to be placed in service of Ireland. However, this was refused as he was required to serve in the Franco-Spanish War of 1635 to 1659.

In January 1641, O'Donnell and O'Neill fought at the Battle of Montjuïc in Catalonia where they both suffered heavy casualties. O'Neill was killed and his regiment was annihilated. O'Donnell retreated south with 450 survivors of his regiment, sacking Reus. He reached Tarragona with the Spanish army but faced a lengthy siege from Catalan rebels. O'Donnell and his regiment were only involved in the siege's early stages. A few weeks after they had arrived in Tarragona, they went behind enemy lines with the Spanish navy to relieve Perpignan in France. It is possible this was punishment for their excesses at Reus. The relief operation failed, and Perpignan was taken by French forces in 1642.

On his return to Spain in 1642, O'Donnell and his men were intercepted by the French navy off Catalonia. (Note: Sources conflict on whether this was off Barcelona or off Tarragona.) An ensuing naval engagement took place across 30 June and 1 July. On the second day of the battle, O'Donnell was entrusted with leading a Spanish attack on the French van after two hours of fighting. His ship, the 60-gun Magdalena, was closely engaged with the French ship Galion de Guise. In an attempt to run down the Spanish flagship, a French fireship accidentally set fire to Galion de Guise. The fire spread to the Magdalena. (Note: Attributed to multiple sources:) Whilst the ship was being evacuated, O'Donnell drowned along with many of his men (Note: Micheline Walsh stated that thirty of his men died in the battle, whereas Rodríguez stated that hundreds of his men died.) on 1 July. The remainder of his men were captured as prisoners.

== Marriage ==
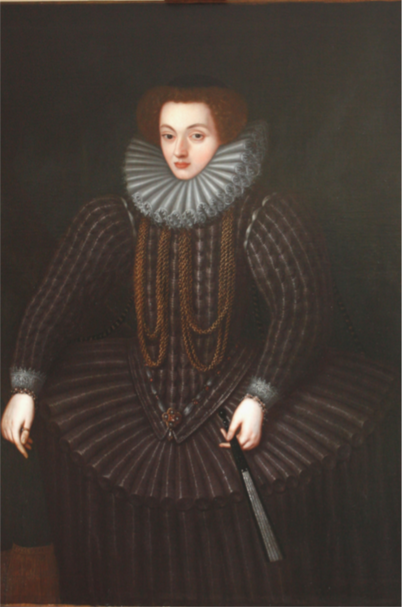
O'Donnell's wife, Anna-Margaret of Henin-Lietard (1608–1634)

On 20 March 1632, (Note: Conversely, the Kilkenny and South-East of Ireland Archaeological Society stated that the couple married "towards the year 1635".) O'Donnell entered into a marriage agreement with noblewoman Anna-Margaret of Henin-Lietard. She was the eldest daughter of Maximilien II de Hénin, 5th Count of Bossu, and his wife Alexandrine Françoise de Gavre. Anna-Margaret died in 1634. O'Donnell had no children.

Maximilien II de Hénin was a Knight of the Golden Fleece. Alexandrine Françoise de Gavre was a near kinswoman of the last eccentric Charles, Duke of Guise. Anna-Margaret's eldest brother was Albert Maximilian de Hennin, who was an ally to Owen Roe O'Neill. Her family had a chateau in what is modern-day Belgium, though their noble house (the House of Hénin of the Belgian nobility) is now extinct.

== Legacy ==
O'Donnell and O'Neill's deaths in consecutive years were a major blow to Irish expectations that the two men would lead an Irish rebellion. The contemporary source Commentariiu Rinuccinianus described O'Donnell and O'Neill thus: "Tyrconnell, an accomplished courtier, expert in matters of war, of the greatest courage, but less prudent than Tyrone, a man of singular judgement". O'Donnell was outlived by his mother Bridget, who died in 1682 at the age of ninety.

According to the original patent of the earldom of Tyrconnell, the title (were it not attainted in 1614) would have passed to Donal Oge O'Donnell, (Note: The text of the Letters Patent is referenced in: (a) O'Donovan 1856 (vol. VI), pp. 2388–2389; (b) Meehan 1870, p. 39; (c) in a partial translation of the Latin original of the Letters Patent held by Count O'Donnell von Tyrconnell in Austria, and recounted in O'Donnell 1989, pp. 5–6. Versions (a) and (b) make explicit reference to the remainder to Donal Oge O'Donnell.) who was the son of Rory's late elder half-brother Donal. In O'Donnell's will, he appointed Hugh Balldearg O'Donnell, a soldier in the Spanish army, as his heir, thus restoring the chieftainship to the elder branch of the family.

As of 2018, two portraits, one of O'Donnell and the other of his wife Anna-Margaret, are held at Kiplin Hall in Yorkshire.

=== Modern appraisal ===
Historian Matteo Binasco notes that, despite O'Donnell's young age, he was a proactive figure who worked tirelessly to support his family's interests, as well as the interests of Irish Franciscans.

== Ancestry ==
Ancestors of Hugh O'Donnell, 2nd Earl of Tyrconnell (Note: Hugh McManus O'Donnell's parents were Manus O'Donnell, Lord of Tyrconnell, and Judith O'Neill (Irish: Siobhán Ó Néill). Iníon Dubh's parents were James MacDonald, 6th of Dunnyveg, and his wife Agnes Campbell. The 12th Earl of Kildare's parents were Gerald FitzGerald, 11th Earl of Kildare and Mabel Browne. Frances Howard's parents were Charles Howard, 1st Earl of Nottingham and Catherine Carey, Countess of Nottingham.)

8. Manus O'Donnell, Lord of Tyrconnell
4. Hugh McManus O'Donnell, Lord of Tyrconnell
9. Siobhán O'Neill
2. Rory O'Donnell, 1st Earl of Tyrconnell
10. James MacDonald, 6th of Dunnyveg
5. Fiona MacDonald
11. Agnes Campbell
1. Hugh Albert O'Donnell
12. Gerald FitzGerald, 11th Earl of Kildare
6. Henry FitzGerald, 12th Earl of Kildare
13. Mabel Browne, Countess of Kildare
3. Bridget FitzGerald, Countess of Tyrconnell
14. Charles Howard, 1st Earl of Nottingham
7. Frances Howard, Countess of Kildare
15. Catherine Howard, Countess of Nottingham

Regnal titles
Preceded by Rory O'Donnell	King of Tyrconnell; 1608–1642	Vacant
Preceded by Rory O'Donnell, 1st Earl of Tyrconnell	Earl of Tyrconnell; 1608–1614	Vacant
