= Mary Stuart O'Donnell =

Irish noblewoman (c. 1607 – after 1638)

- Born: Mary O'Donnell c. 1607; London, England
- Died: During or after 1639; Possibly Rome
- Noble family: O'Donnell dynasty
- Spouse: Dudley O'Gallagher (m. 1630)
- Father: Rory O'Donnell, 1st Earl of Tyrconnell
- Mother: Bridget FitzGerald

Lady Mary Stuart O'Donnell (Irish: Máire Stíobhartach/Stiúbhart Ní Dhomhnaill; c. 1607 – in or after 1639) was an English-born Irish noblewoman. Her father, Rory O'Donnell, 1st Earl of Tyrconnell, left her pregnant mother Bridget behind in Ireland during the Flight of the Earls. Born in England, Mary and her mother survived on a pension from James VI and I and she grew up in Ireland as a Catholic.

Due to her strong-willed nature and devout Catholicism, she became estranged from her mother's Protestant family, and after breaking into a London prison to free Irish fugitives, she fled to Brussels with her boyfriend Dualtach O'Gallagher. She faced further issues when her brother Hugh and his allies sought to use her as a marital tool to unite their noble families.

Mary and O'Gallagher escaped to Italy, where they married and had at least one child. The circumstances of her death are unknown - she was last recorded living in Rome in 1639.

== Family background ==
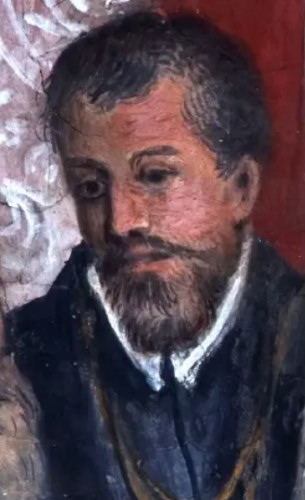
Mary's father, Rory O'Donnell, 1st Earl of Tyrconnell

Mary O'Donnell was born in London around late 1607. She was the only daughter of Irish nobleman Rory O'Donnell, 1st Earl of Tyrconnell, and his wife Bridget FitzGerald. Her paternal grandparents were Hugh McManus O'Donnell, the Gaelic Irish lord of Tyrconnell, and Scottish noblewoman Fiona "Iníon Dubh" MacDonald. Her maternal grandparents were Henry FitzGerald, 12th Earl of Kildare, and Frances Howard.

Rory fought against the English Crown in the Nine Years' War. He surrendered in December 1602 and subsequently married Bridget. Their only son, Hugh Albert O'Donnell, Baron of Donegal, was born about October 1606. However, the terms of Rory's surrender led to financial difficulties and a reduced status, and according to reports, he began plotting a Catholic revolt against the Crown. By September 1607, British officials became aware of Rory's treasonous activities, and it is possible they intended to imprison or execute him. In response, Rory and his wartime ally Hugh O'Neill, Earl of Tyrone, abruptly fled from Ireland for continental Europe in what is known as the Flight of the Earls. He was joined by his extended family (including Hugh Albert) and retinue, Tyrone's family and various followers. When Bridget learned of her husband's departure, she was pregnant with Mary and expected to deliver in two weeks. As she was staying at her paternal grandmother's Maynooth estate at the time, far away from the point of departure in Rathmullan, she was left behind. Rory did not intend to abandon her, assuming she would reunite with him in Europe at a later time.

A few weeks after the Flight, Rory's messenger Owen MacGrath attempted to persuade Bridget to leave Ireland and join her husband, but she refused. Bridget's mother Frances advised her to cooperate with the English. Bridget never saw her husband or son again. Arthur Chichester sent Bridget to London to defend herself.

== Early life ==
As an infant, she was presented by Bridget at the English court with a personal appeal to King James VI and I. Bridget sufficiently roused the King with an emotional telling of her plight and financial troubles, and he granted Bridget a pension of £200 from Tyrconnell's escheated estates. He also gave the infant the name "Mary Stuart" after his mother the Queen of Scots, and placed her under royal protection. As the daughter of an earl, she was styled as 'Lady Mary'.

Rory died in Rome of a fever in July 1608.

In 1609, Bridget returned to her family's estates in Kildare. Mary was raised there by her mother as a Catholic.

Mary's pension was decreased by £50 after her mother's second marriage (1619).

== Life in London ==
In 1619, her mother remarried, and Mary went to live in England with her maternal grandmother for the next few years. She received a generous dowry from the King.

Lady Kildare attempted to anglicise the young girl and proposed to leave Mary her substantial inheritance. However, within a few years, the strong-willed Mary had dismayed her mother's family due to her Catholicism and her failure to marry. Additionally, her pension was often not paid on time, leading to financial troubles. Much to the consternation of her mother's family, she increasingly associated with the young, disaffected Irish Catholics of London.

Lady Kildare had thought that a Protestant husband would resolve Mary's insolent behaviour, but Mary objected to the favoured suitor exactly because of his Protestantism. She was also already in a relationship with Catholic man Dudley "Dualtach" O'Gallagher.

In the summer of 1626, Mary and several friends broke into a London prison (Note: Potentially the Tower of London.) and freed her cousins Caffar "Con" O'Donnell and Hugh O'Rourke, who had recently been incarcerated for refusing to revoke their claims over planted land in Ireland. Following this incident, she was ordered to appear before the royal court. She instead opted to go into hiding, then flee London with O'Gallagher during the latter months of 1626.

== Escape to continental Europe ==
Disguised as a man named Rudolph Huntley, and wearing a sword, she got clear of London and after many wanderings arrived in Bristol. She was accompanied by a maid, Anne Baynham, similarly disguised, and by a young "gentilhomme son parent" (most likely O'Gallagher).

At Bristol her sex was suspected; but, according to a Spanish panegyrist, who likens her to various saints, she bribed a magistrate, offered to fight a duel, and made fierce love to another girl. Two attempts were made to reach Ireland, but the ship was beaten back into the Severn. At last Mary got off in a Dutch vessel, and was carried with her two companions to La Rochelle. She retained her doublet, boots, and sword, and at Poitiers had sex with another lady. She may have taken a ship to Cádiz, then moved on to France and finally Brussels.

== Brussels ==
It took Mary six weeks to reach Brussels, and her trip was recorded by a man named Alberto Enriquez. In all likelihood, his account was written to portray Mary heroically to Archduchess Isabella Clara Eugenia, to whom Mary was appealing for financial support. Enriquez's account described Mary as a devout Catholic seeking safety on the Continent. Enriquez does not mention O'Gallagher's presence - the fact that Mary was travelling with a man of lower status was seen by some as a reason for scandal.

On her arrival at Brussels in January 1627, Pope Urban VIII wrote her a special congratulatory letter. He praised her "heroic" character and defiance against Protestantism.

Mary met her elder brother, Hugh Albert, for the first time in Brussels. Through his influence, she was received by Isabella's court. Isabella granted her a pension.

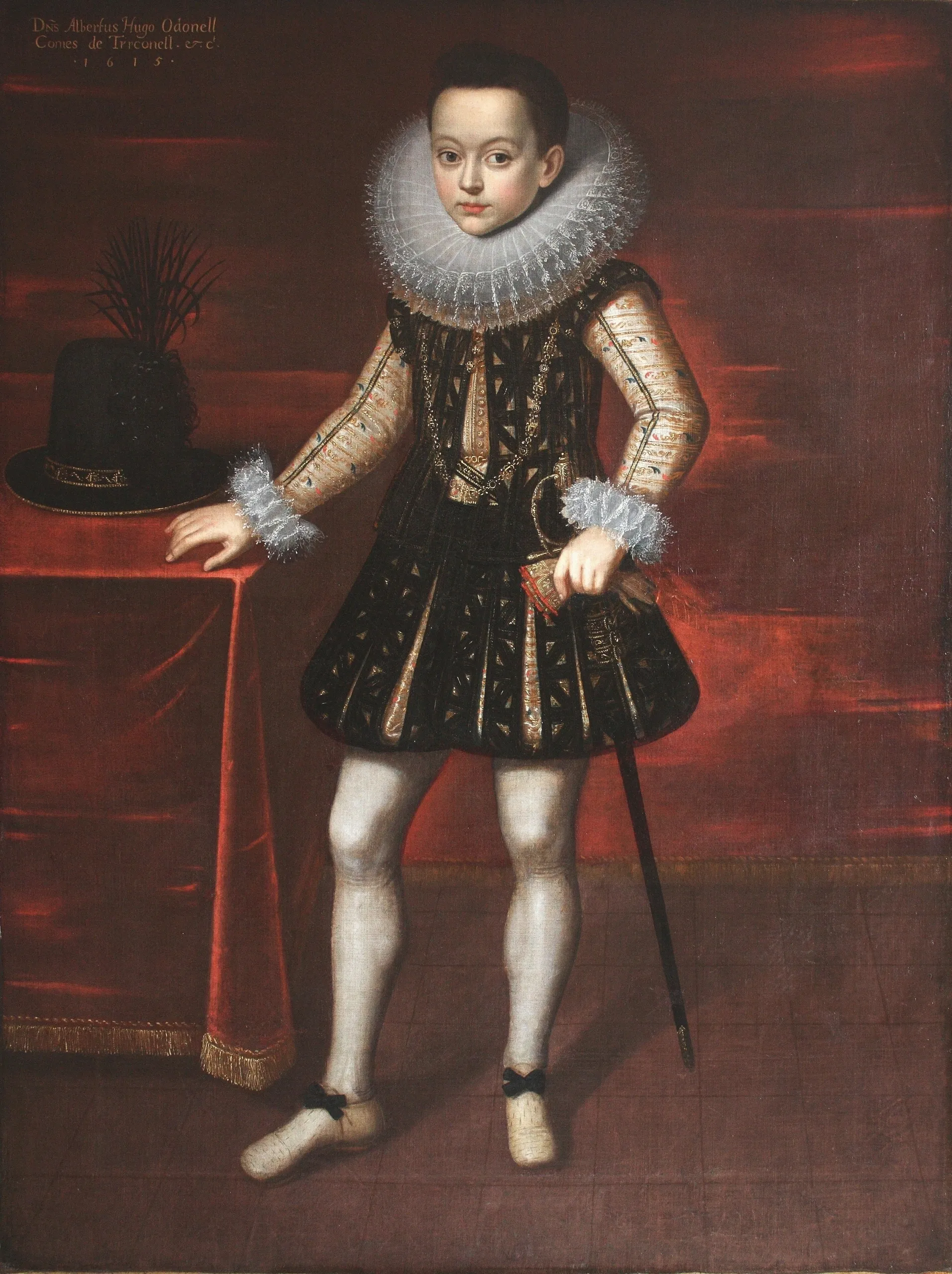
Lady Mary's elder brother, Hugh Albert O'Donnell, 10 years of age as a page at the court of Albert VII.

However, Mary faced difficulties with her new compatriots when Archbishop of Tuam Florence Conry arranged for her to be married to Shane O'Neill, 3rd Earl of Tyrone, an Irish nobleman who had become a decorated officer in the Spanish army. The relations between the O'Neills and the O'Donnells had become strained after the war's end, and Conry hoped a unifying marriage would allay hostilities between the noble families. Hugh Albert had hoped to unite the families in preparation for a planned invasion of Ireland in 1627.

Mary, who had kept her relationship with O'Gallagher secret, anticipated conflict if she rejected the marriage. She secretly wrote to Lord Conway, English Secretary of State, defending her flight from authorities, and proposing that with the right guarantee, she could return to England, and with her, bring Shane into the King's service. This plan came to naught. Historian Jerrold Casway believes that this saga exposes "the hopelessness of her position".

Around 1629, Mary became pregnant, and her relationship with O'Gallagher was exposed. The disgraced couple once again fled, this time from Brussels to Italy. They arrived in Rome in 1630, where she was greeted with admiration as the daughter of the late 1st Earl of Tyrconnell.

== Italy ==
Mary and O'Gallagher married in Rome. The couple unsuccessfully petitioned the pope for financial help. They later settled in Genoa, where Mary gave birth to a boy.

By this time, her relationship with the Catholic Church and the O'Donnell family had irrevocably broken down. The Church was unwilling to support Mary, and Hugh Albert claimed that Mary was an imposter pretending to be his sister. She had also estranged her elder brother by continuing to seek adventures in men's clothes. Mary and O'Gallagher had to survive on a subsidy from Archduchess Isabella.

== Vienna ==
The couple found refuge in Vienna, where they were treated warmly by Irish Franciscans. In February 1632 Mary wrote to Cardinal Barberini (nephew of Pope Urban VIII) saying that another child was expected. In 1635, O'Gallagher became a captain in the imperial army, but was killed during his service. Her infant son fell ill and died shortly after her husband's passing.

== Later life and death ==
Beset by grief and estranged from her family, she travelled Europe once again before eventually settling down in Rome. By 1639, Mary was living in Rome, married to "a poor Irish captain".

Nothing more is known of her life after 1639. She apparently "died in poverty on the continent". According to some lore, she was buried in Prague.

== Ancestry ==
Ancestors of Mary Stuart O'Donnell (Note: Hugh McManus O'Donnell's parents were Manus O'Donnell, Lord of Tyrconnell, and Judith O'Neill (Irish: Siobhán Ó Néill). Iníon Dubh's parents were James MacDonald, 6th of Dunnyveg, and his wife Agnes Campbell. The 12th Earl of Kildare's parents were Gerald FitzGerald, 11th Earl of Kildare and Mabel Browne. Frances Howard's parents were Charles Howard, 1st Earl of Nottingham and Catherine Carey, Countess of Nottingham.)

8. Manus O'Donnell, Lord of Tyrconnell
4. Hugh McManus O'Donnell, Lord of Tyrconnell
9. Siobhán O'Neill
2. Rory O'Donnell, 1st Earl of Tyrconnell
10. James MacDonald, 6th of Dunnyveg
5. Fiona MacDonald
11. Agnes Campbell
1. Mary Stuart O'Donnell
12. Gerald FitzGerald, 11th Earl of Kildare
6. Henry FitzGerald, 12th Earl of Kildare
13. Mabel Browne, Countess of Kildare
3. Bridget FitzGerald, Countess of Tyrconnell
14. Charles Howard, 1st Earl of Nottingham
7. Frances Howard, Countess of Kildare
15. Catherine Howard, Countess of Nottingham
