= Jenico Preston, 7th Viscount Gormanston =

Irish peer, Jacobite soldier and landowner

Jenico Preston, 7th Viscount Gormanston (born at Gormanston, County Meath 1631; died at Limerick 17 March 1691), was an Irish peer, Jacobite soldier and landowner.

== Life ==
The elder son of Nicholas Preston, 6th Viscount Gormanston and Mary Barnewall, eldest daughter of Nicholas, 1st Viscount Barnewall by his wife Bridget, Dowager Countess of Tyrone, eldest daughter and co-heiress of Henry FitzGerald, 12th Earl of Kildare, he succeeded in 1643 to his father's title. In July 1647 Lord Gormanston is recorded as attending a Jesuit school at Kilkenny and went into exile with King Charles II in 1651 when his lands were confiscated after the Royalist and Confederate forces were defeated by Cromwell's forces. The Gormanston estates, held by his father before the Irish Rebellion of 1641, were restored to him in 1660 upon the Stuart Restoration.

Commissioned into the Irish Army in September 1685 as a lieutenant in the regiment of Colonel Richard Talbot, Duke of Tyrconnell, he was promoted captain in March 1686. He then successfully petitioned King James II to reverse his father's outlawry and also in 1686 was sworn of the Privy Council of Ireland. Appointed Alderman of Drogheda in 1687 and Burgess of Athboy in 1689 by Royal Charter, Viscount Gormanston served as Lord Lieutenant of Meath (1689–1691).

A member of the Irish House of Lords, he sat in the short-lived Patriot Parliament called by James II in 1689. Lord Gormanston was appointed a Commissioner of the Treasury in 1690.

Promoted lieutenant-colonel in the Irish Army, Lord Gormanston served at the battles of Cavan and the Boyne in 1690. On 17 March 1691 during the Siege of Limerick, the 7th Viscount died leaving no male heir, thus was succeeded in the family title by his nephew, Jenico Preston (1640–1697) as de jure 8th Viscount.

Married twice, firstly to Lady Frances Leke (who died without issue in 1682), daughter of Francis Leke, 1st Earl of Scarsdale, and by his second wife, Margaret Molyneux, daughter of Caryll, 3rd Viscount Molyneux, Lord Gormanston had an only daughter, Mary Preston (who married her cousin, Anthony Preston, de jure 9th Viscount Gormanston).

Posthumously indicted for high treason and declared an outlaw by decree of King William III on 16 April 1691, the viscountcy was thereby attainted (later restored in 1800).

== See also ==
- Gormanston Castle
- Lodge's Peerage of Ireland

Peerage of Ireland
Preceded by Nicholas Preston, 6th Viscount	Viscount Gormanston; 1643–1691	Succeeded by Jenico Preston, de jure 8th Viscount
