= Proposed 1627 Spanish invasion of Ireland =

In 1627, a group of Irish emigres, including Florence Conry, Shane O'Neill and Hugh Albert O'Donnell, proposed a Spanish invasion of Ireland.

== Background ==
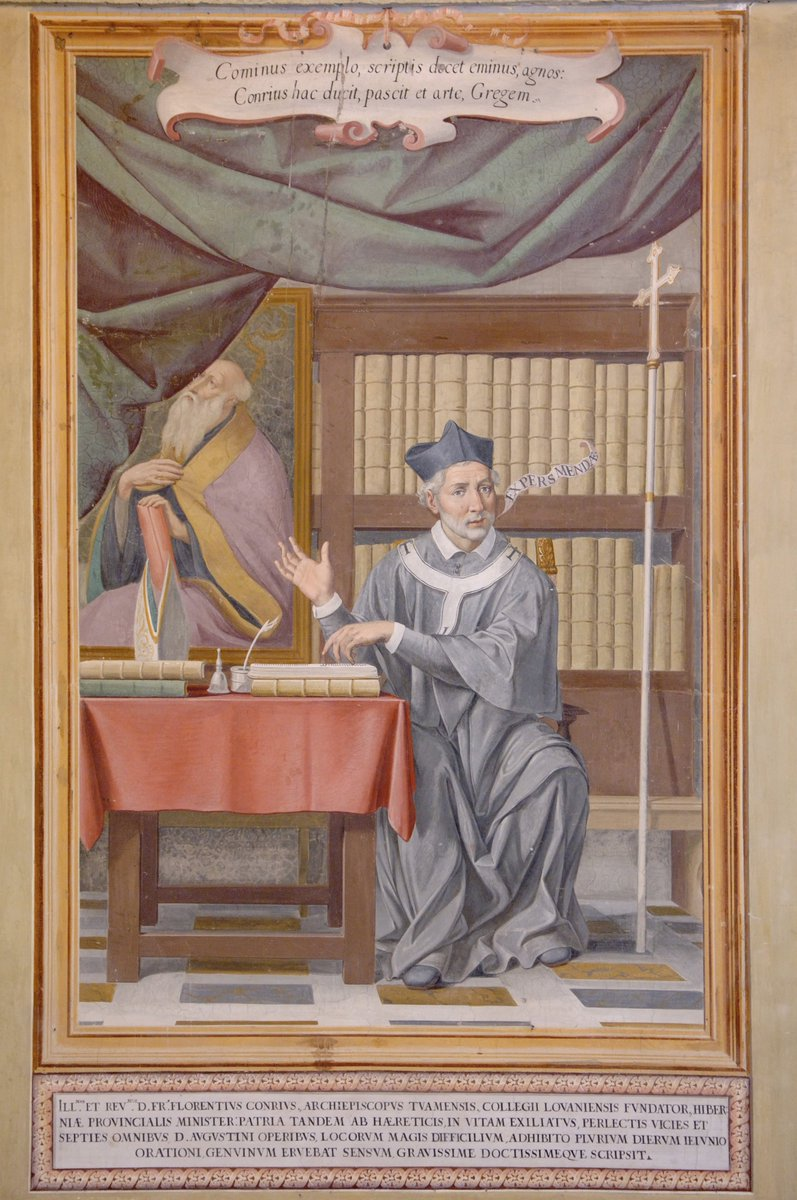
Catholic Archbishop Florence Conry was an important adherent to the O'Neill family during their exile in Catholic Europe.

Conflict between Spain and England was revived with the Anglo-Spanish War of 1625 to 1630. Irishmen in Spanish service saw the opportunity to use this conflict to liberate Ireland from English control. It is unclear who first proposed the idea of a Spanish invasion of Ireland—possibly Irish Cistercian Paul Ragget. From 1625, two groups of Irish expatriates in the Low Countries (clergymen led by Archbishop Conry and soldiers led by Owen Roe) pressured the Spanish government to support their invasion plans. The Infanta rejected this proposal in September 1625. Undaunted, Conry and Owen Roe made their way to Madrid to present their plan to Philip IV.

By this time, Hugh Albert O'Donnell had succeeded his father as Earl of Tyrconnell (Note: Though the title had officially been attainted by the Irish Parliament in 1614, Hugh Albert continued to call himself Earl of Tyrconnell.) and had begun a military career. Shane and Hugh Albert were the eldest surviving sons of their fathers, who themselves were the heads of the two most powerful Ulster clans. Prior to the Nine Years' War, the two clans had been rivals for centuries. Tension was still present during the war, requiring a treaty of equality to be signed by clan leaders.

Conry proposed that Shane and Hugh Albert should equally command the expedition. It was agreed that, to avoid jealousy and tension between the Earls, both Shane and Hugh Albert should be made generals of equal footing "as one will never serve under the other". Hugh Albert had previously expressed a desire to be regarded as Shane's equal. When Hugh Albert had begun his military career, he had requested that his pay be raised to equal Shane's and also claimed: "I do not consider myself inferior in rank, services and obligations to the Counts of Tiron." Though Hugh Albert was seven years younger than Shane, he declared that he was as entitled to the colonelcy of an Irish regiment as Shane. It was proposed that Shane's regiment should be divided in half, and that Hugh Albert should take command of one half. Walloon soldiers would be drafted to supplement additional soldiers.

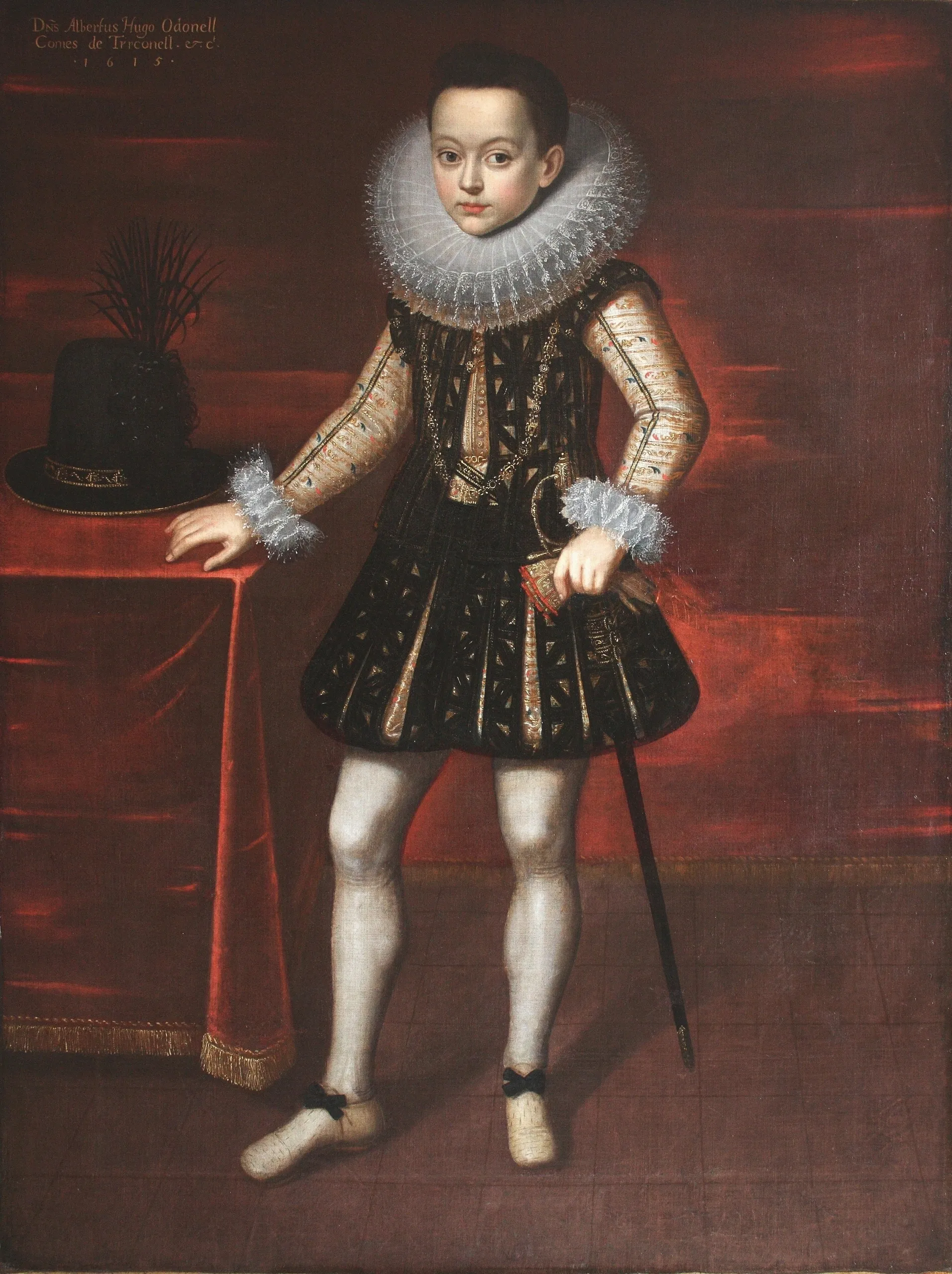
Shane O'Neill and Hugh Albert O'Donnell, Earl of Tyrconnell (pictured), colonels of the first two Irish regiment in the Spanish Netherlands, quarreled over their rank.

Conry proposed that the fleet should land at Killybegs in modern-day County Donegal, with Teelin and Derry occupied to provide defensible ports. When the earls got to Ireland, they should write to the dominant Irish noblemen and call for a united Ireland to free itself from English rule. No English or Scottish men, nor any anglicised Irishmen, should be brought on the expedition. This invasion plan was considered feasible, as small Dutch forces were then holding out from Spain in the Eighty Years' War.

A fleet of 11 ships had been prepared at Dunkirk by March 1627, with the fleet anticipated to sail in September 1627. Disagreements remained however, as the Spanish government was reticent to be publicly associated with the invasion. The Infanta, wishing to reduce the repercussions to Spain in the event of failure, suggested that the fleet should not bring their banners, and should sail under the pretenses that they were a disbanded regiment returning home to Ireland. Per this plan, the previously proposed 2,000 Walloon soldiers could not be brought along. The Infanta's plan was disliked by the Irish, who were not willing to reduce the numbers of the invasion fleet.

The two Earls also argued over their dual leadership. Shane and Hugh Albert could not abide each other. The authorities in Brussels wished for Shane to be in sole command, while Madrid favoured Hugh Albert (probably because Conry remained there as an advisor).

Conry proposed that a marriage should be arranged between Shane and Mary Stuart O'Donnell, Hugh Albert's sister, to remove tensions and unify the noble families. Mary was born in England a few months after the Flight, as her pregnant mother Bridget had been left behind due to time constraints. Mary was a free spirit and a staunch Catholic who disliked her mother's Protestant family; in 1626 she fled from England following her involvement in a prison break. She arrived in Brussels in January 1627 where she met her brother Hugh Albert for the first time and was lauded by Pope Urban VIII as a hero of Catholic Europe. Conry wrote in March 1627, "Let the king of Spain... get the Infanta to treat of bringing about a marriage between the sister of the earl of Tyrconnell, who has lately fled from England and the earl of Tyrone, and let his Majesty give her a dowry, since her brother cannot do so". Shane was then 28; Mary was about 19.

"It was proposed that I should bring about a marriage between the earl of Tyrone and the sister of the earl of Tyrconnell, so as to join them in closer friendship... this marriage has been treated of, but the sister of Tyrconnell has declared that she has no wish whatever to marry Tyrone."

—The Infanta Isabella, April 1627

However, Mary was secretly in a relationship with an Irishman named Dudley O'Gallagher, who had accompanied her to the Continent; she rejected the marriage. Mary anticipated conflict in response to her rejection of the marriage proposal, and so she wrote to the English secretary of state Edward Conway in an unsuccessful attempt to reconcile with English authorities.

Historians Seán Bonner and Tomás Ó Fiaich have suggested that this invasion was the first proposal of an Irish Republic. With the approval of Philip IV, it was proposed (possibly by Owen Roe) that, if the invasion was successful, an Irish republic should be established rather than a new monarchy. This was to avoid conflict between the earls over who had the right to the throne of Ireland. "The earls should be called Captains General of the said republic and... one could exercise his office on land and the other at sea". This proposal for an early Irish Republic is contained in a document dated 21 December 1626.

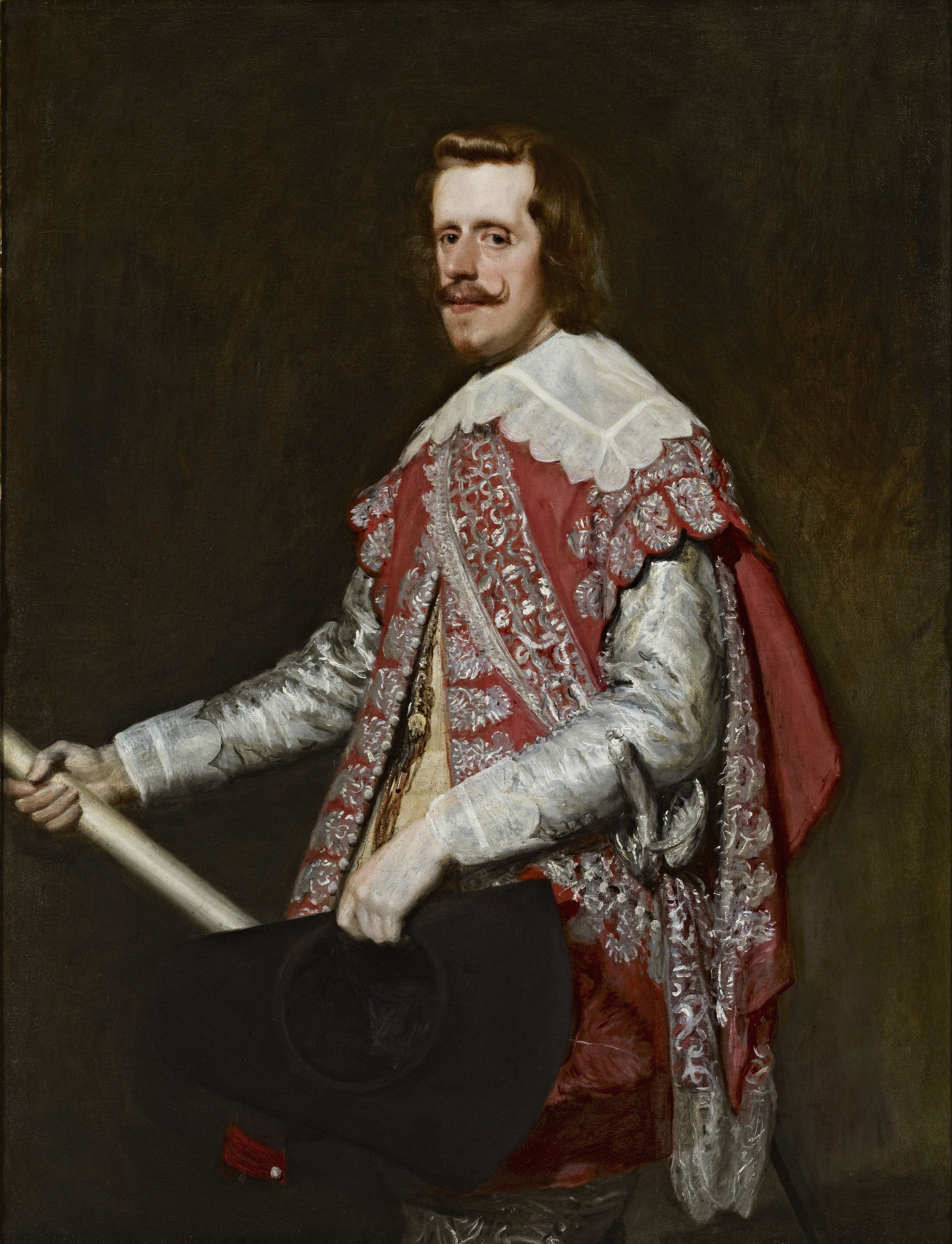
Shane repeatedly petitioned Philip IV of Spain for assistance in a proposed Spanish invasion of Ireland.

Shane was considered a threat to English supremacy in Ireland. A letter from the Lord Deputy of Ireland, Viscount Falkland, dated 27 April 1627, claimed that Shane would be sent to Ireland in July at the head of a Spanish army to have himself crowned King of Ulster by Philip IV. Shane would be appointed governor of Ireland on Spain's behalf, and would have the power to create new noble titles, to attract important allies and gain the cooperation of Irish Catholics. Falkland also claimed that a story was circulating among the Irish that Shane had already received a crown of gold, which he kept on his bedside table in Brussels.

Despite an English expedition on Cádiz in 1625, the Anglo-Spanish conflict did not develop into full-scale war. Philip IV was never optimistic about the invasion's chances and was unwilling to support an independent Ireland whilst Spain was officially at peace with England. Plans for the invasion were abandoned. Philip IV wished "only to preserve what he has" rather than acquiring more territory in Ireland. Conry died in Madrid in 1629. The plan to bond the two Irish noble families was unsuccessful. Around 1629, Mary became pregnant and her relationship with O'Gallagher was exposed. The couple fled to Italy in disgrace.
