= Nicholas Preston =

Nicholas Preston may refer to:

- Nicholas Preston, 6th Viscount Gormanston (1606–1643)
- Nicholas Preston, 17th Viscount Gormanston (born 1939)
