= Nicholas Preston, 6th Viscount Gormanston =

Irish viscount (died 1643)

Nicholas Preston
- Viscount Gormanston
- Tenure: 1630–1643
- Predecessor: Jenico, 5th Viscount Gormanston
- Successor: Jenico, 7th Viscount Gormanston
- Born: c. 1608
- Died: 29 July 1643
- Spouse: Mary Barnewall
- Issue Detail: Jenico & others
- Father: Jenico, 5th Viscount Gormanston
- Mother: Margaret St. Lawrence

Nicholas Preston, 6th Viscount Gormanston (1606–1643) sat in the House of Lords of the Irish Parliament of 1634–1635 and sided with the insurgents after the Irish Rebellion of 1641.

== Birth and origins ==
Nicholas was born about 1608, the eldest son of Jenico Preston and his wife Margaret St. Lawrence. His father was the 5th Viscount Gormanston. His father's family descended from Robert Preston, 1st Baron Gormanston whose ancestors had come from Preston, Lancashire, England, some generations before. His mother was a daughter of Nicholas St Lawrence, 9th Baron Howth.

Family tree

Nicholas Preston with wife, parents, and other selected relatives. (Note: This family tree is based on genealogies of the Viscounts Gormanston. Also see the list of children in the text.)

Christopher; 4th Viscount; Gormanston d. 1600	Catherine; FitzWilliam
Jenico; 5th Viscount; Gormanston; 1585–1630	Margaret; St. Lawrence d. 1637	Nicholas; 1st Viscount; Barnewall; 1592–1663	Thomas; 1st Viscount; Tara; 1585–1655; General
Nicholas; 6th Viscount c. 1608 – 1643	Mary; Barnewall	Mabel; Barnewall	Christopher; 2nd Earl; Fingall d. 1649	Anthony; 2nd Viscount d. 1649
Jenico; 7th Viscount d. 1691	Margaret; Caryll	Nicholas; Preston	Elizabeth; Preston
Mary; Preston d. 1750	Jenico; 8th Viscount d. 1697	Anthony; 9th Viscount d. 1716

Legend

XXX	Subject of the article	XXX	Viscounts; Gormanston	XXX	Earls of Fingall	XXX	Viscounts; Barnewall	XXX	Viscounts; Tara

== Marriages and children ==
Preston married Mary Barnewall. She was a daughter of Nicholas Barnewall, 1st Viscount Barnewall and Lady Bridget FitzGerald. Her family was Old English.

Nicholas and Mary had two sons:

1. Jenico (died 1691), his successor
2. Nicholas, married his cousin Elizabeth Preston, daughter of Anthony Preston, 2nd Viscount Tara

—and two daughters, who do not seem to be known by name.

== 6th Viscount and House of Lords ==
Preston succeeded his father in 1630 as the 6th Viscount Gormanston. Gormanston, as he was now, sat in the House of Lords during the two Irish parliaments of King Charles I.

=== Parliament of 1634–1635 ===
The Irish Parliament of 1634–1635 was opened on 14 July 1634 by the new Lord Deputy of Ireland, Thomas Wentworth (the future Lord Strafford), who had taken office in July 1633. Gormanston took his seat on the day of opening, the 14 July 1634. (Note: Gormanston took his seat on the 14 July 1634. Cokayne's date is wrong.) Wentworth asked to vote taxes: six subsidies of £50,000 (equivalent to about £9,700,000 in 2025) were passed unanimously by both houses. The parliament also belatedly and incompletely ratified the Graces of 1628, in which the King conceded rights for money.

=== Parliament of 1640–1649 ===
The Irish Parliament of 1640–1649. (Note: Also called the "Parliament of 1639–1648" as its start date and end date are both affected by the shift in the start of the year from 25 March to 1 January in the calendar reform of 1750. The opening date, the 16 March 1640, was still in 1639 according to the Old Style (O.S.) calendar, in force in Great Britain and Ireland at the time. Similarly, the end date, the 30th of January 1649 (the execution of Charles I), was still in 1648 according to O.S.) was opened on 16 March 1640 by Christopher Wandesford, whom Strafford, as Wentworth was now called, had appointed Lord Deputy. Strafford arrived two days later. Gormanston was there on the 18 March.

In its first session the parliament unanimously voted four subsidies of £45,000 (about £9,500,000 in 2025) to raise an Irish army of 9000 for use by the King against the Scots in the Second Bishops' War. On 3 April 1640 Strafford left Ireland.

The Lords sent a separate delegation for their grievances. Gormanston was part of it.

== Death ==
Gormantown died on 29 July 1643, aged about 35. He was posthumously outlawed on 17 November 1643. He was succeeded by his elder son Jenico as the 7th Viscount Gormanston.

== Notes and references ==
=== Sources ===
- Asch, Ronald G. (2004). "Wentworth, Thomas, first earl of Strafford (1593–1641)". In Matthew, Colin; Harrison, Brian (eds.). Oxford Dictionary of National Biography. Vol. 56. New York: Oxford University Press. pp. 142–157. ISBN 0-19-861408-X.
- Bergin, John (October 2009). McGuire, James; Quinn, James (eds.). "Preston, Nicholas". Dictionary of Irish Biography.
- Bagwell, Richard (1909). Ireland under the Stuarts and under the Interregnum. Vol. I. London: Longmans, Green, and Co. OCLC 458582656. – 1603 to 1642
- Burke, Bernard (1866). A Genealogical History of the Dormant, Abeyant, Forfeited and Extinct Peerages of the British Empire (New ed.). London: Harrison. OCLC 11501348.
- Burke, Bernard; Burke, Ashworth Peter (1915). A Genealogical and Heraldic History of the Peerage and Baronetage, the Privy Council, Knightage and Companionage (77th ed.). London: Harrison. OCLC 1155471554.
- Carte, Thomas (1851) [1st pub. 1736]. The Life of James Duke of Ormond. Vol. I (New ed.). Oxford: Oxford University Press. OCLC 1086656347. – 1613 to 1641
- Cokayne, George Edward (1892). Complete Peerage of England, Scotland, Ireland, Great Britain and the United Kingdom, Extant, Extinct, or Dormant. Vol. IV (1st ed.). London: George Bell and Sons. OCLC 1180828941. – G to K (for Gormanston)
- Cusack, Mary Frances (1871). A Compendium of Irish History. Boston: Patrick Donahoe. OCLC 873009963.
- Fryde, Edmund Boleslaw; Greenway, D. E.; Porter, S.; Roy, I., eds. (1986). Handbook of British Chronology. Royal Historical Society Guides and Handbooks, No. 2 (3rd ed.). London: Offices of the Royal Historical Society. ISBN 0-86193-106-8. – (for timeline)
- Gardiner, Samuel Rawson (1899). "Wentworth, Thomas, first Earl of Strafford (1593–1641)". In Lee, Sidney (ed.). Dictionary of National Biography. Vol. LX. London: Smith, Elder, & Co. pp. 268–283. OCLC 8544105.
- Gerard, John (1913). "Chronology, General". In Herbermann, Charles George (ed.). Catholic Encyclopedia. Vol. III. New York: The Encyclopedia Press. pp. 738–742. OCLC 1157968788.
- Gillespie, Raymond (2006). Seventeenth-Century Ireland: Making Ireland Modern. Dublin: Gill & MacMillan. ISBN 978-0-7171-3946-0.
- House of Commons (1878). Return. Members of Parliament – Part II. Parliaments of Great Britain, 1705–1796. Parliaments of the United Kingdom, 1801–1874. Parliaments and Conventions of the Estates of Scotland, 1357–1707. Parliaments of Ireland, 1599–1800. London: His/Her Majesty's Stationery Office. OCLC 13112546.
- House of Lords (1779). Journals of the House of Lords (PDF). Vol. I. Dublin: William Sleater. OCLC 35009219. – 1634 to 1699
- Kearney, Hugh Francis (1959). Strafford in Ireland 1633–1641 – a Study in Absolutism. Manchester: Manchester University Press. OCLC 857142293.
- Wedgwood, Cicely Veronica (1961). Thomas Wentworth, First Earl of Strafford 1593–1641. A Revaluation. London: Jonathan Cape. OCLC 1068569885.
