= Viscount Gormanston =

Title in the Peerage of Ireland

Viscountcy of Gormanston
- Or on a Chief Sable three Crescents of the First
- Creation date: 7 August 1478
- Created by: Edward IV
- Peerage: Peerage of Ireland
- First holder: Robert Preston, 4th Baron Gormanston
- Present holder: Nicholas Preston, 17th Viscount Gormanston
- Heir apparent: Hon. Jenico Preston
- Subsidiary titles: Baron Gormanston (I); Baron Gormanston, of Whitewood (UK)
- Status: Extant
- Former seat: Gormanston Castle

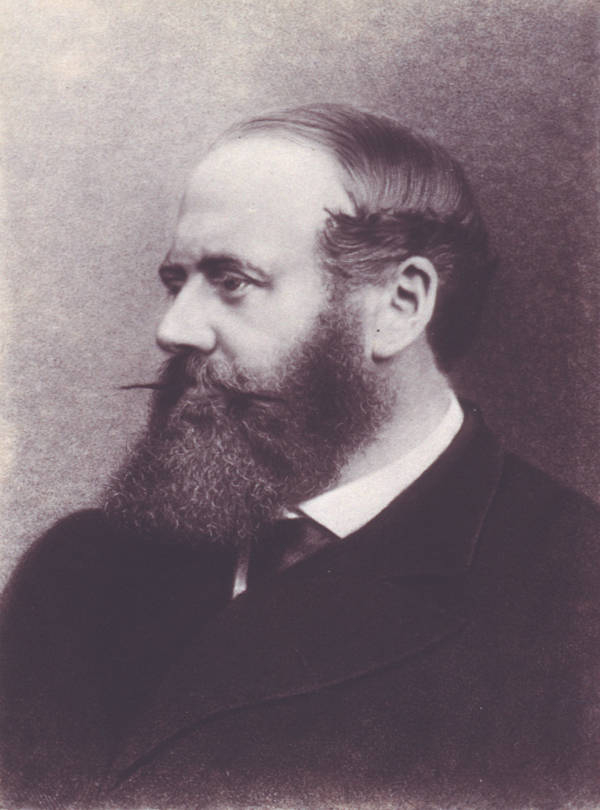
Viscount Gormanston GCMG

Viscount Gormanston is a noble title, created in 1478, held by the Anglo-Irish Preston family since the Middle Ages. The oldest vicomital title in the British Isles, Lord Gormanston is accorded the style of Premier Viscount of Ireland.

Descended from Sir Robert Preston, who served as Lord Chancellor of Ireland, sometime between 1365 and 1370, he was created Baron Gormanston by writ of the Parliament of Ireland. His son and heir, Sir Christopher Preston the second Baron, played a prominent part in public affairs, and was arrested for treason in 1418. His great-grandson, Sir Robert Preston the fourth Baron, served as Lord Deputy of Ireland: in 1478 he was created Viscount Gormanston in the peerage of Ireland. His son, Sir William Preston the second Viscount, served as Lord Justice of Ireland in 1525. A later descendant, the seventh Viscount, was a supporter of King James II and was outlawed after the Glorious Revolution.

Jenico Preston helped to suppress the Irish Rebellion of 1798, and in 1800 he had the outlawry reversed and was summoned to the Irish House of Lords as the twelfth Viscount Gormanston. He was the great-grandson of Anthony Preston, the de jure ninth Viscount Gormanston, the nephew of the seventh Viscount. The twelfth Viscount was succeeded by his son, the thirteenth Viscount. In 1868 he was created Baron Gormanston, of Whitewood in County Meath, in the peerage of the United Kingdom, which gave the Viscounts an automatic seat in the House of Lords. His son, the fourteenth Viscount, notably served as Governor of British Guiana and as Governor of Tasmania. The 15th Viscount was a Captain in the Royal Irish Fusiliers and a Deputy Lieutenant for County Meath. As of 2025 the peerage titles are held by the latter's great-grandson who succeeded as the seventeenth Viscount in 1940 at the age of seven months, when his father was killed in action during the Battle of France during the Second World War.

Another member of the Preston family was Thomas Preston, 1st Viscount Tara. He was the second son of the fourth Viscount Gormanston. Also, John Preston, 1st Baron Tara, was a descendant of a younger brother.

The unusual first name Jenico borne by many of Preston family sons derives from the Gascon-born soldier Sir Jenico d'Artois, a prominent military commander who became a substantial landowner in Ireland. His daughter and heiress Jeanne married the 3rd Baron Gormanston, being the mother of Sir Robert Preston, later created a viscount.

The ancestral seat was Gormanston Castle, County Meath, close to the county border with Dublin.

== Barons Gormanston (1365/1370) ==
- Robert Preston, 1st Baron Gormanston (died 1396)
- Christopher Preston, 2nd Baron Gormanston (died 1422)
- Christopher Preston, 3rd Baron Gormanston (died 1450)
- Robert Preston, 4th Baron Gormanston (died 1503; created Viscount Gormanston in 1478)

== Viscounts Gormanston (1478) ==
- Robert Preston, 1st Viscount Gormanston (1435–1503)
- William Preston, 2nd Viscount Gormanston (died 1532); only son of the 1st Viscount
- Jenico Preston, 3rd Viscount Gormanston (1502–1569); only son of the 2nd Viscount
- Christopher Preston, 4th Viscount Gormanston (1546–1599); eldest son of the 3rd Viscount
- Jenico Preston, 5th Viscount Gormanston (1584–1630); eldest son of the 4th Viscount
- Nicholas Preston, 6th Viscount Gormanston (1608–1643); only son of the 5th Viscount
- Jenico Preston, 7th Viscount Gormanston (died 1691) (outlawed 1691); eldest son of the 6th Viscount
- Jenico Preston, de jure 8th Viscount Gormanston (1640–1700); eldest son of 2nd (and youngest) son of the 6th Viscount
- Anthony Preston, de jure 9th Viscount Gormanston (died 1716); only brother of the de jure 8th Viscount
- Jenico Preston, de jure 10th Viscount Gormanston (1707–1757); only son of de jure 9th Viscount
- Anthony Preston, de jure 11th Viscount Gormanston (1736–1786); eldest son of the de jure 10th Viscount
- Jenico Preston, 12th Viscount Gormanston (1775–1860) (restored 1800); only son of the de jure 11th Viscount
- Edward Anthony John Preston, 13th Viscount Gormanston (1796–1876); eldest son of the 12th Viscount
- Jenico William Joseph Preston, 14th Viscount Gormanston (1837–1907); eldest son of the 13th Viscount
- Jenico Edward Joseph Preston, 15th Viscount Gormanston (1879–1925); eldest son of the 14th Viscount
  - Married the daughter of Gen. Sir William Butler and painter Lady Butler
- Jenico William Richard Preston, 16th Viscount Gormanston (1914–1940)
  - The eldest son of the 15th Viscount, Captain Preston of the King's Own Yorkshire Light Infantry was KIA at Dunkirk in 1940.
- Jenico Nicholas Dudley Preston, 17th Viscount Gormanston (born 1939); only son of the 16th Viscount
  - The heir apparent is the present Viscount's elder son the Hon. Jenico Francis Tara Preston (born 1974)
    - The heir-in-line is the Hon. Jenico Preston's son, Jenico Bertram Nicholas Alfred Preston (born 2016).

== See also ==
- Baron Tara
- Viscount Tara
- Irish House of Lords
