= Nicholas Barnewall, 1st Viscount Barnewall =

Irish politician

Nicholas Barnewall, 1st Viscount Barnewall (1592 – 20 August 1663) of Turvey, County Dublin, was an Irish landowner and politician.

== Family history ==
After the subjection of Ireland in the time of Henry II, Michael de Berneval, who served under Richard de Clare, 2nd Earl of Pembroke, obtained large grants of land at Berehaven, County Cork, of which the O'Sullivans had been dispossessed. Here the Bernevals flourished in great prosperity until the reign of King John, when the Irish rose against them, and destroyed every member of the family but one, who happened to be in London learning the law. The latter, returning to Ireland, was settled at Drimnagh, near Dublin, where his posterity remained until the reign of James I. The family were traditionally Roman Catholic in religion, although after the Reformation the head of the family might find it expedient to conform to the Church of Ireland, at least outwardly, in order to preserve the family estates.

Various members of the family distinguished themselves, chiefly in the law and in Parliament.

== Life ==
Nicholas, born in 1592, was the eldest son of Sir Patrick Barnewall of Turvey House, Donabate. His mother was Mary Bagenal, daughter of Sir Nicholas Bagenal, knight marshal of Ireland. Turvey was built on the site of Grace Dieu Abbey, which the family received on the Dissolution of the Monasteries. He was educated at the English College, Douai and Gray's Inn.

He was thirty years old when his father died in 1622, and he represented County Dublin in the Irish House of Commons in the Parliaments of 1634 and 1639. When the rebellion of 1641 broke out, he was appointed Governor of County Dublin to command such forces as he could raise, which were to be armed by the state for the defence of County Dublin. However, according to John Lodge's Peerage of Ireland: "...dreading the designs of the Irish, he fled into Wales with his wife, several priests, and others, and stayed there till after the cessation of arms was concluded, returning to Captain Bartlett's ship 17 March 1643."

A conversation on board this ship with his cousin Susanna Stockdale, reported by Lodge, points to the fact that his sympathies were rather with the Roman Catholics in Ireland than the Protestants, Roman Catholic sympathies being traditional in his family, and it is there said that he was very intimately acquainted with some that were near Queen Henrietta Maria of France. It may therefore be that Charles I was influenced by Queen Henrietta in raising Barnewall to the Irish peerage as Baron of Turvey and Viscount Barnewall, of Kingsland in the parish of Donabate in the County of Dublin, in 1645, "as being sensible of his loyalty and taking special notice both of his services in Ireland and those of his son Patrick in England."

Lord Barnewall died at Turvey on 20 August 1663. He had married in 1617 Lady Bridget FitzGerald, daughter of Henry FitzGerald, 12th Earl of Kildare and Lady Frances Howard and the widow of Rory O'Donnell (also known as Rudhraighe Ó Domhnaill, 1st Earl of Tyrconnell). They had five sons and four daughters. He was succeeded by his second son, Henry, 2nd Viscount Barnewall. His daughter Mabel married firstly Christopher Plunkett, 2nd Earl of Fingall and secondly her cousin Colonel James Barnewall. She died at a great age in 1699. Her sister Mary married Nicholas Preston, 6th Viscount Gormanston.

Peerage of Ireland
New creation	Viscount Barnewall; 1646–1663	Succeeded by Henry Barnewall
