= Kilkea Castle =

Castle in County Kildare, Ireland

Coordinates: 52°56′36″N 6°53′13″W

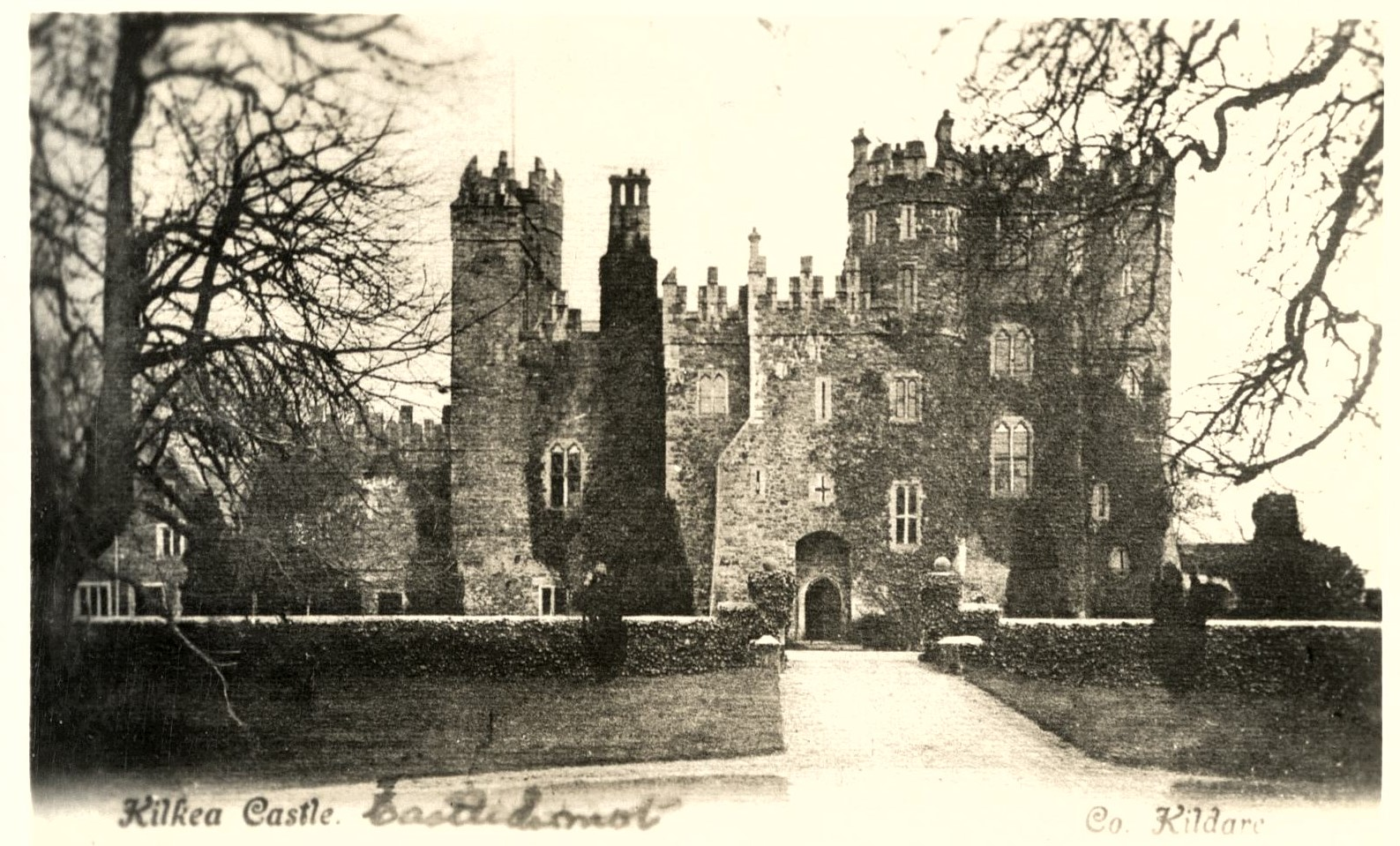
Kilkea Castle, Castledermot Ireland

Kilkea Castle is located 5 km (3.1 mi) northwest of Castledermot, County Kildare, Ireland near the village of Kilkea on the R418 regional road from Athy to Tullow. It was a medieval stronghold, for over 700 years, of the Fitzgeralds, earls of Kildare.

== History ==
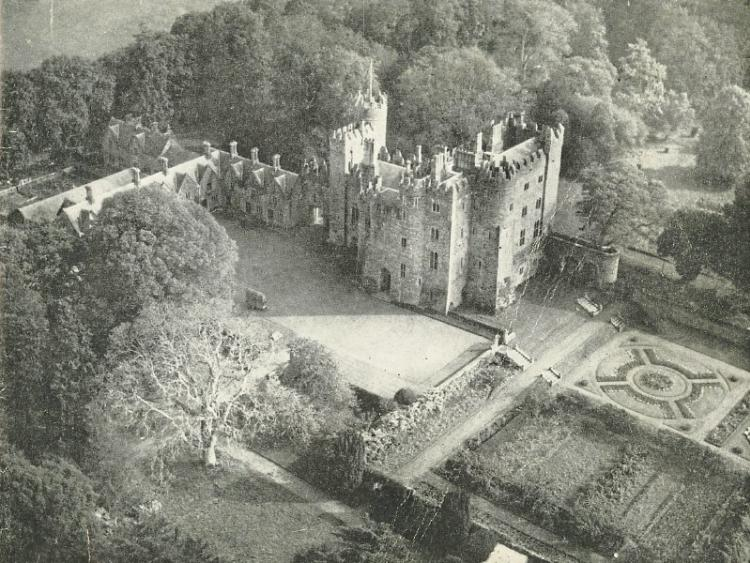
Kilkea Castle, aerial view

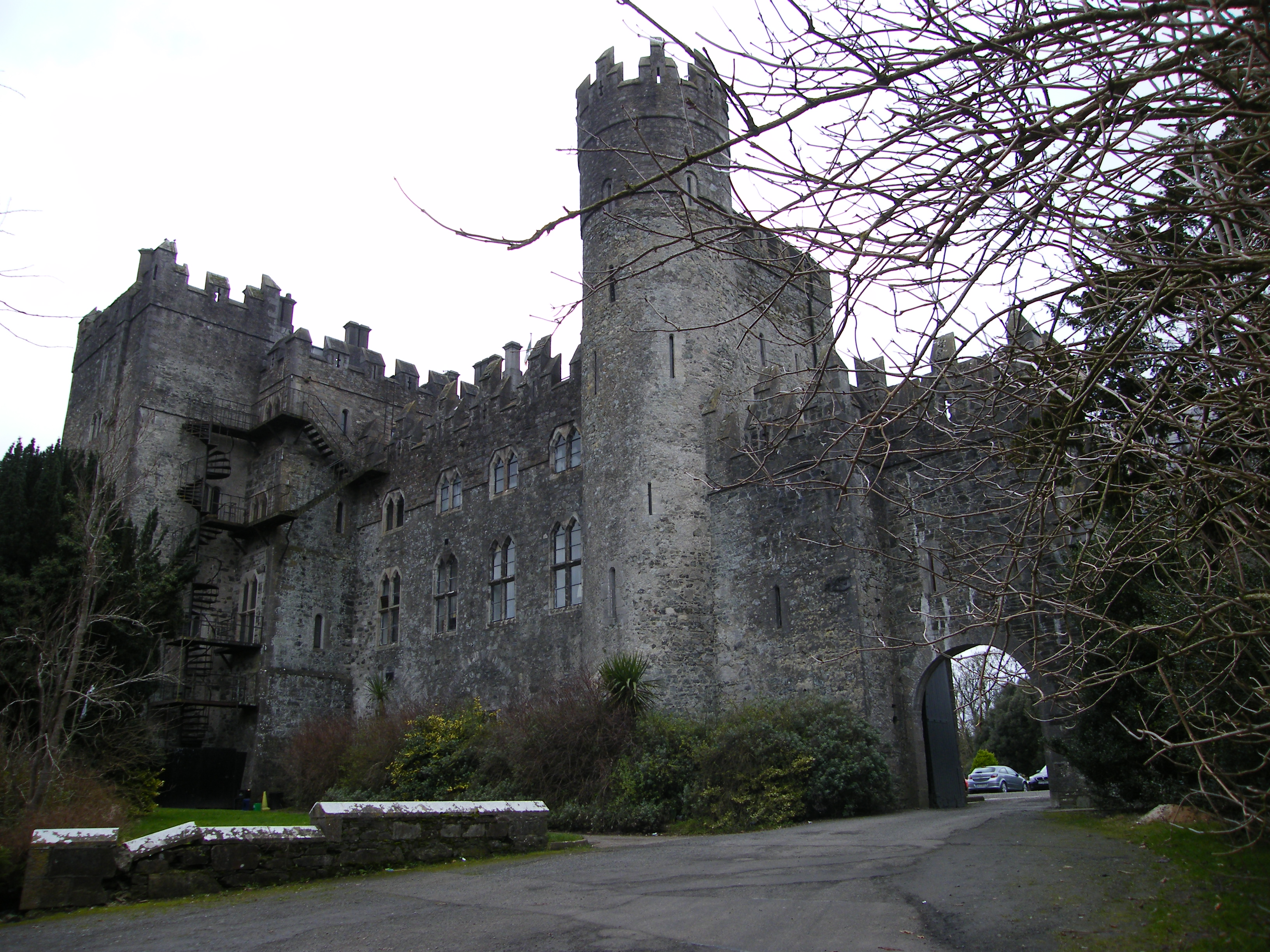
Kilkea Castle, rear view

Sir Walter de Riddlesford built a motte and bailey on the site of Kilkea Castle in 1180. A granddaughter of his married Maurice Fitzgerald, 3rd baron of Offaly, and so the Manor of Kilkea came into the possession of the Fitzgeralds and was to remain in the family for over 700 years.

Sir Thomas de Rokeby, the Justiciar of Ireland 1349-56, used the castle as his military base, and died here in 1356.

In 1414 the O'Mores and O'Dempsies wasted the English pale. According to Francis Grose's Antiquities of Ireland, "to curb their outrages, Thomas Crawley, Archbishop of Dublin and Lord Justice, set out from Dublin, but proceeded no farther than Castledermot; the troops went forward under military leaders, he remaining engaged in processions and prayers for their success". According to Grose, the "enemy were defeated with great slaughter at Kilkea". Later, in 1426, John FitzGerald, 6th Earl of Kildare reputedly "strengthened Kilkea with so many new works, that he might be said almost to have new built it".

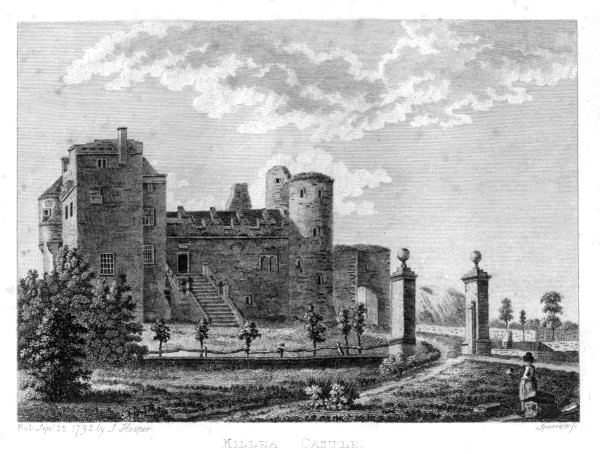
Representation of the castle from Antiquities of Ireland (published 1791)

The castle is particularly associated with Gerald, the 11th Earl of Kildare known as the "Wizard Earl", who became the eldest male representative of the Geraldines when only 12 years of age after his half brother "Silken Thomas" the 10th Earl and five uncles were executed at Tyburn in 1537. The "Wizard Earl" escaped Ireland, being sent to the continent to be educated, and following his return to Kildare and restoration to his titles his interest in alchemy caused much interest among his neighbours around Kilkea Castle and he was said to possess magic powers. The 11th Earl (the "Wizard Earl") died in 1585 and is supposed to return to the castle every seventh year mounted on a silver-shod white charger. In 1634 the castle was leased to the Jesuit Order by Countess Elizabeth, the widow of Gerald FitzGerald, 14th Earl of Kildare and they remained there until 1646. That year the order entertained the Archbishop Rinuccini, Papal Nuncio to the Confederation of Kilkenny at Kilkea.

In the early 18th century, the 19th Earl of Kildare decided to make Carton House the family seat and Kilkea Castle was leased to a succession of tenants. One of these tenants was Thomas Reynolds, a Dublin silk merchant, who was a "friend" of Lord Edward FitzGerald, through whom Reynolds had become a United Irishman, only to become an informer. His role as informer did not prevent the castle (which had been renovated shortly before) from being sacked by the military during the rebellion. After Carton House was sold in 1949, Kilkea Castle became the seat of the 8th Duke of Leinster.

== Developments ==
The castle and estate was sold by the Fitzgerald family in 1960. In 1966 it was restored and developed as a hotel under the direction of architect Niall Montgomery. The hotel entered examinership in 2009, as a result of the Irish financial crisis. It was closed and put up for sale in 2010. It was bought by an American business-man, Jay Cashman, investing $35 million in renovations, and has since reopened as a resort.

== Shackleton connection ==
The polar explorer Sir Ernest Shackleton (1874-1922) was born at Kilkea House, near the castle, to a Quaker family.
