= Bridget FitzGerald =

Irish poet and noble woman

- Viscountess Barnewall
- Born: c. 1589
- Died: 1682 (aged 92–93)
- Spouses: Rory O'Donnell (m. 1606; died 1608); Nicholas Barnewall (m. 1617; died 1663)
- Issue: 11, including Hugh Albert O'Donnell and Mary Stuart O'Donnell
- Father: Henry FitzGerald, 12th Earl of Kildare
- Mother: Frances Howard, Countess of Kildare

Bridget FitzGerald, Countess of Tyrconnell and later Viscountess Barnewall (c. 1589 – 1682), was an Irish noblewoman and poet. The wife of Rory O'Donnell, 1st Earl of Tyrconnell, she was left behind in Ireland during the Flight of the Earls in 1607. She later remarried to Nicholas Barnewall, 1st Viscount Barnewall.

== Early life ==
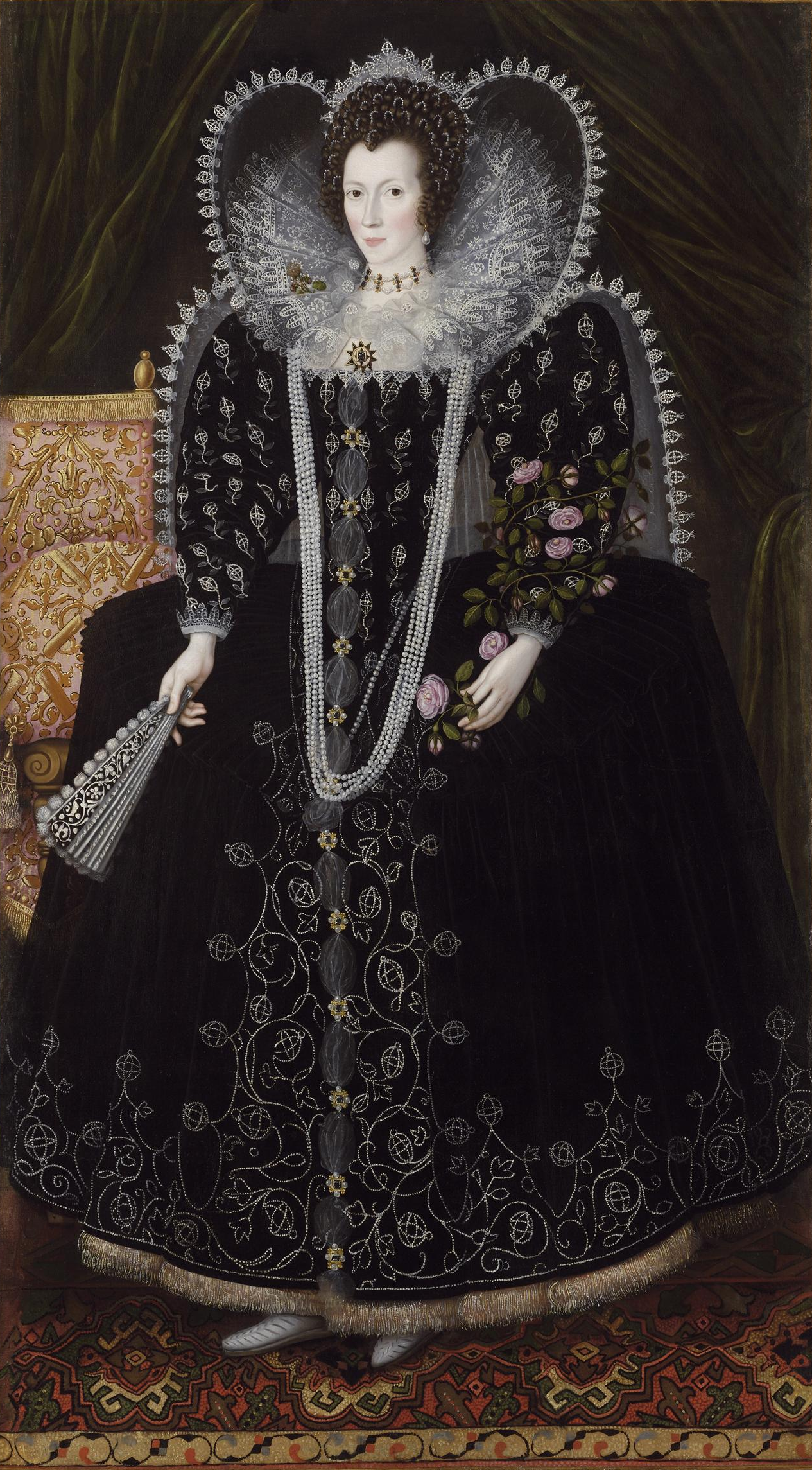
Bridget's mother, Frances Howard, Countess of Kildare

Bridget FitzGerald was born circa 1589. Her parents were Henry FitzGerald, 12th Earl of Kildare, and Lady Frances Howard, daughter of the Earl of Nottingham. When her father died in 1597 she was sent to live with her grandmother, Mabel Browne, Countess of Kildare, in Maynooth.

== First marriage ==
Bridget married Rory O'Donnell, 1st Earl of Tyrconnell, either in 1604 or around Christmas 1606. Their only son, Hugh Albert, was born around October 1606. Due to increasing hostility from the English nobility, Rory fled Ireland in September 1607 whilst Bridget was pregnant with their second child. Rory was joined by about ninety people - his extended family (including Hugh Albert), the family of wartime ally Hugh O'Neill, and various followers. As Bridget was staying at her paternal grandmother's Maynooth estate at the time, far away from the point of departure in Rathmullan, she was left behind.

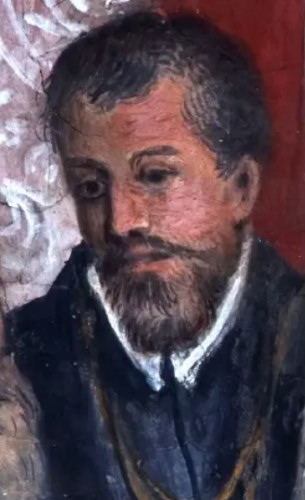
Bridget's first husband, Rory O'Donnell, 1st Earl of Tyrconnell

When Bridget learned of her husband's departure, she was expected to deliver the baby within two weeks. Rory did not intend to abandon her, assuming she would reunite with him in Continental Europe at a later time. According to Rory's messenger Owen MacGrath, "[Rory's flight was not] for want of love... if [he] had known sooner of his going, he would have taken [Bridget] with him." Nevertheless, nineteen-year-old Bridget was distressed and furious by her husband leaving with no warning.

MacGrath attempted to persuade Bridget to leave Ireland a few weeks after the flight. She considered going, though she eventually refused. Bridget's mother, Lady Kildare, had advised her to cooperate with the English. Bridget never saw her husband or son again. Rory died in Rome on 28 July 1608.

== Second marriage and death ==
Bridget presented her daughter at the English court with a personal appeal to King James I. Bridget sufficiently roused the king with an emotional telling of her plight and financial troubles, and he granted Bridget a pension of £200 from Tyrconnell's escheated estates. Mary was placed under the patronage of the King and Bridget was sent back to Ireland. In 1609, Bridget returned to her family's estates in Kildare. She raised Mary there as a Catholic.

On 7 July 1617 or 1619, Bridget remarried to Nicholas Barnewall, 1st Viscount Barnewall from Turvey, County Dublin. They had nine children. Barnewall died on 20 August 1663.

Bridget died in 1682, at the age of ninety.

== Poetry ==
She wrote in Irish, but only one of her poems has survived, a work in an elegant classical style from about 1607.

== Children ==
With Rory O'Donnell, 1st Earl of Tyrconnell:

- Hugh Albert O'Donnell, 2nd Earl of Tyrconnell (c. October 1606 – 1 July 1642); married Anna-Margaret de Hénin in 1632
- Mary Stuart O'Donnell (c. 1607 – after 1638); married Dudley O'Gallagher in 1630

With Nicholas Barnewall, 1st Viscount Barnewall:

- Patrick Barnewall, eldest son, who served as a colonel in the royal army during the English Civil War
- Henry Barnewall, 2nd Viscount Barnewall (died June 1688)
- Mabel Barnewall (died February 1699); married Christopher Plunket, 2nd Earl of Fingall
- Richard Barnewall
- Colonel James Barnewall
- Mary Barnewall (died May 1642)
- One other son and two other daughters

== Ancestry ==
Ancestors of Bridget FitzGerald

8. Gerald FitzGerald, 9th Earl of Kildare
4. Gerald FitzGerald, 11th Earl of Kildare
9. Elizabeth Grey, Countess of Kildare
2. Henry FitzGerald, 12th Earl of Kildare
10. Anthony Browne
5. Mabel Browne, Countess of Kildare
11. Alice Gage
1. Bridget FitzGerald, Countess of Tyrconnell
12. William Howard, 1st Baron Howard of Effingham
6. Charles Howard, 1st Earl of Nottingham
13. Margaret Gamage
3. Frances Howard, Countess of Kildare
14. Henry Carey, 1st Baron Hunsdon
7. Catherine Howard, Countess of Nottingham
15. Anne Morgan, Baroness Hunsdon

== See also ==
- Irish poetry
- Irish syllabic poetry
