= Gerald FitzGerald, 11th Earl of Kildare =

Irish peer

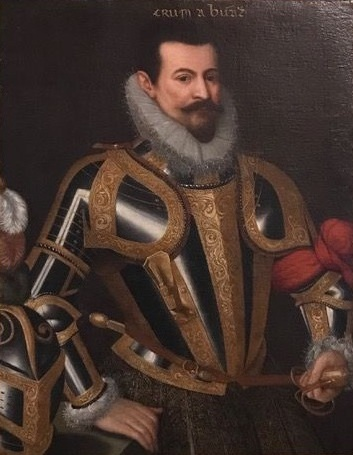
Gerald FitzGerald, 11th Earl of Kildare

Arms of FitzGerald: Argent, a saltire gules

Gerald FitzGerald, 11th Earl of Kildare (1525 – 16 November 1585), also known as the "Wizard Earl" (a sobriquet also given to Henry Percy), was an Irish peer. He was the son of Gerald FitzGerald, 9th Earl of Kildare and his second wife Elizabeth Grey of the Royal House of Grey.

== Biography ==
Young Lord Kildare became the sole male representative of the Kildare Geraldines at the age of twelve, after his half-brother, Silken Thomas, the tenth earl, was executed at Tyburn in February 1537 with five of his uncles. He spent the next few years on the run in Ireland and spent some time in Tír Chonaill (now mainly County Donegal) in Ulster, under the guardianship of his aunt, Lady Eleanor McCarthy, the wife of Manus O'Donnell, An Ó Domhnaill. The short-lived Geraldine League, a federation including the O'Neills, the O'Donnells, the O'Briens of Thomond, and other powerful Irish clans related to the Geraldines through marriages, formed around FitzGerald's claim to the Earldom of Kildare. The League came to nothing, however, after the principal members were badly defeated in modern-day County Monaghan following a raid into The Pale in August 1539.

FitzGerald escaped Ireland with a few loyal servants and was protected from King Henry VIII and his agents by both Francis I of France and Charles V of the Holy Roman Empire. He was educated at a monastery in Liège, and later spent time with Ercole Cardinal Gonzaga, Lord Bishop of Mantua, a scion of the House of Gonzaga and the effective 'Regent' of the Duchy of Mantua. Due to his time in the Cardinal's court, FitzGerald was fluent in Italian and experienced the court culture of Renaissance Italy. From there, he then moved on to Rome, and for three years studied under the guidance of his kinsman, Reginald Cardinal Pole, later Lord Archbishop of Canterbury.

During his exile from Ireland, FitzGerald fought with the Knights of Rhodes against the Turks and travelled as far as Tripoli in Libya, then held by the Knights of St. John. Following the death of Henry VIII in 1547, he travelled to England and was received at the court of Edward VI. The young king restored the Kildare lands to him at this time.

During the reign of Mary I, FitzGerald assisted in suppressing the rebellion of Sir Thomas Wyatt in 1554. He was then restored as Earl of Kildare and Baron of Offaly. He returned to Ireland soon after.

Lord Kildare had a keen interest in alchemy, which caused much speculation among those living around Kilkea Castle. He was rumoured to possess magic powers, and thus earned the nickname "the Wizard Earl". He was a highly intelligent and cultivated man, "a product of the Renaissance", but he seems to have lacked the political skills of his grandfather, The 8th Earl of Kildare, who virtually ruled Ireland for 35 years, and in the turbulent political atmosphere of the 1560s and 70s he was increasingly vulnerable to attack, especially since he openly professed the Roman Catholic faith. He was also unfortunate in being the father-in-law of Lord Delvin, who was suspected of treason throughout his career.

His restoration as Earl of Kildare aroused the hostility of many, both Old English and New English, and successive Lord Deputies, and throughout his career he was frequently accused of treason, and was imprisoned in Dublin Castle and later in the Tower of London. He owed his survival mainly to the personal regard of Queen Elizabeth I, who twice dismissed the charges of treason against him. He conformed to the Protestant religion at the beginning of the reign of Queen Elizabeth. In his last years although technically a free man he was forbidden to leave London, save that he was permitted to take his seat in the Parliament of Ireland which met in Dublin during April–May 1585.

Lord Kildare died in London, still in a condition of semi-captivity, on 16 November 1585.

According to legend, his ghost returns to Kilkea Castle every seventh year, mounted on a silver-shod white charger.

== Marriage ==
While at the court of Edward VI, FitzGerald met Mabel Browne, daughter of Sir Anthony Browne, Master of the Horse and his first wife Alice Gage; after Alice's death Anthony became the first husband of FitzGerald's sister, Elizabeth FitzGerald. Kildare and Mabel Browne married during the reign of Mary I on 28 May 1554, in the Chapel Royal.

Amongst a certain branch of the FitzGerald's, there was a belief/legend that the 11th Earl of Kildare had been married to an Ellinor O'Kelly by Thomas Leverous (later Bishop of Kildare) in 1545. This resulted in the birth of the progenitor of this branch of the FitzGerald's. However, the date purported for the marriage seems unlikely given the timescale and that there would not be some written sources to confirm this event (the marriage to the head of the house of Kildare would always attract notice).

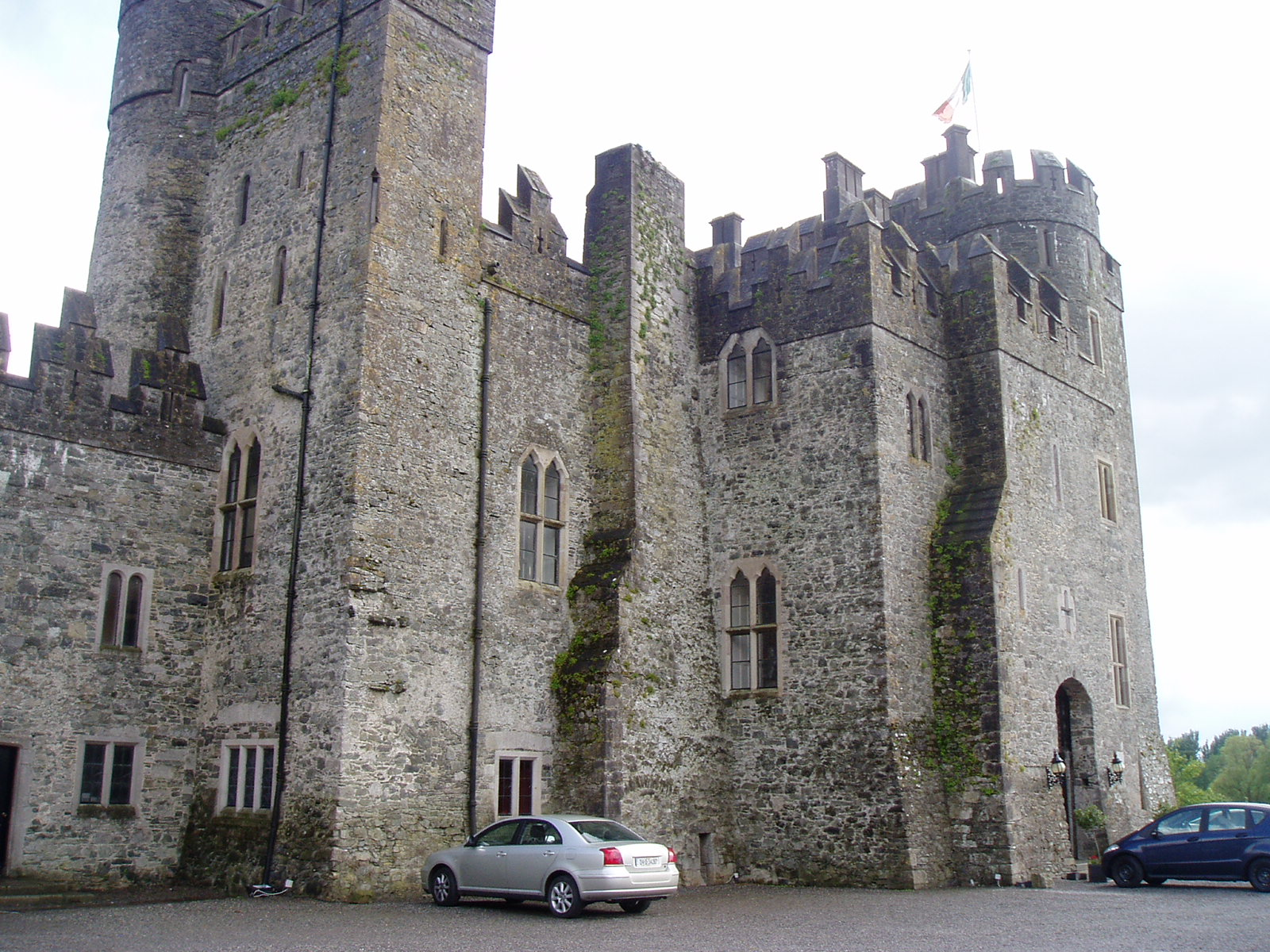
Kilkea Castle, the principal residence of Gerald FitzGerald and Mabel Browne, as it appears today

=== Issue ===
1. Lady Elizabeth FitzGerald (d. 12 January 1617), married Donnchadh MacConchobhair O'Brien, the 4th Earl of Thomond, by whom she had issue.
2. Lord Gerald FitzGerald, Lord Offaly, Lord Garratt (28 December 1559 – June 1580), married in October 1578, Catherine Knollys, a granddaughter of Mary Boleyn. They had a daughter Lettice Digby, 1st Baroness Offaly who married Sir Robert Digby. These were the direct ancestors of the celebrated 19th-century adventuress Jane Digby.
3. Lord Henry Na Tuagh FitzGerald, 12th Earl of Kildare, (1562–1597), married Lady Frances Howard, by whom he had female issue.
4. Lord William FitzGerald, 13th Earl of Kildare (d. April 1599), died unmarried.
5. Lady Mary FitzGerald (d. 1 October 1610), married Christopher Nugent, 6th Baron Delvin, by whom she had issue.
6. Lady Mabel FitzGerald (b. 1564- d. 1587), married Dudley Bagenal, by whom she had issue.

Mabel died in 1610, much troubled in her last years by a lawsuit brought by her granddaughter Lettice, claiming that the Earl's will had been fraudulently altered.

== In fiction ==
Gerald FitzGerald appears in The Irish Princess by Karen Harper, a fictional portrayal of the life of FitzGerald's sister, Elizabeth FitzGerald.

== Ancestors ==
Ancestors of Gerald FitzGerald, 11th Earl of Kildare

16. John FitzGerald, 6th Earl of Kildare
8. Thomas FitzGerald, 7th Earl of Kildare
17. Rose Basset
4. Gerald FitzGerald, 8th Earl of Kildare
18. James FitzGerald, 6th Earl of Desmond
9. Lady Joan FitzGerald
19. Mary de Burgh
2. Gerald FitzGerald, 9th Earl of Kildare
20. John FitzEustace
10. Rowland FitzEustace, 1st Baron Portlester
5. Alison FitzEustace
1. Gerald FitzGerald, 11th Earl of Kildare
24. Sir Edward Grey
12. Sir John Grey
25. Elizabeth Ferrers, 6th Baroness Ferrers of Groby
6. Thomas Grey, 1st Marquess of Dorset
26. Richard Woodville, 1st Earl Rivers
13. Elizabeth Woodville
27. Jacquetta of Luxembourg
3. Lady Elizabeth Grey
28. William Bonville
14. William Bonville, 6th Baron Harington
29. Elizabeth Harington
7. Cecily Bonville, 7th Baroness Harington
30. Richard Neville
15. Lady Katherine Neville
31. Alice Montacute, 5th Countess of Salisbury

Peerage of Ireland
Preceded by Thomas FitzGerald (forfeit in 1537)	Earl of Kildare; 1569–1585	Succeeded by Henry FitzGerald
New creation	Baron Offaly; 1554–1585	Succeeded by Henry FitzGerald
