= Mabel Browne, Countess of Kildare =

Irish noble

Mabel Browne
- Countess of Kildare; Baroness of Offaly
- Born: c.1536 Sussex, England
- Died: 25 August 1610; Ireland
- Spouses: Gerald FitzGerald, 11th Earl of Kildare, Baron of Offaly
- Issue: Lady Elizabeth FitzGerald; Lord Gerald FitzGerald, Lord Offaly, Lord Garratt; Lord Henry Na Tuagh FitzGerald, 12th Earl of Kildare; Lord William FitzGerald, 13th Earl of Kildare; Lady Mary FitzGerald
- Father: Sir Anthony Browne KG
- Mother: Alice Gage
- Occupation: Gentlewoman of the Privy Chamber

Mabel Browne, Countess of Kildare (c. 1536 – 25 August 1610) was an English courtier. She was wife of Gerald FitzGerald, 11th Earl of Kildare, Baron of Offaly (25 February 1525 – 16 November 1585). She was born into the English Roman Catholic Browne family whose members held prominent positions at the courts of the Tudor sovereigns for three generations. Mabel served as a gentlewoman of Queen Mary I's privy chamber, and enjoyed the Queen's favour.

== Family ==
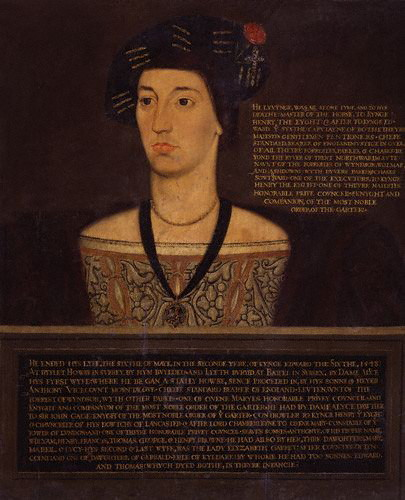
Sir Anthony Browne

Mabel was born in Sussex, England in about 1536, to Sir Anthony Browne, Knight of the Garter, Master of the Horse, and his first wife Alice Gage. Her paternal grandparents were Sir Anthony Browne, Standard Bearer of England and Governor of Queenborough Castle, and Lucy Neville. Mabel's maternal grandparents were Sir John Gage and Philippa Guildford. She had five brothers, including Anthony Browne, 1st Viscount Montagu, and two sisters. One of her aunts was Elizabeth Browne, a lady-in-waiting to Anne Boleyn.

Mabel's mother died in 1540. When Mabel was about seven years of age, in 1543, her father married Elizabeth FitzGerald, an Irish noblewoman celebrated as The Fair Geraldine in a sonnet by Henry Howard, Earl of Surrey. The Brownes were Roman Catholics, but even after the dissolution of the monasteries Mabel's father enjoyed the favour of King Henry VIII when he was granted the estate of Battle Abbey in East Sussex. Mabel spent her childhood there and at Cowdray House in West Sussex, which had come into Sir Anthony's possession in 1542.

Mabel's father died on 6 May 1548, and his widow married secondly Edward Clinton, 1st Earl of Lincoln.

== Marriage ==
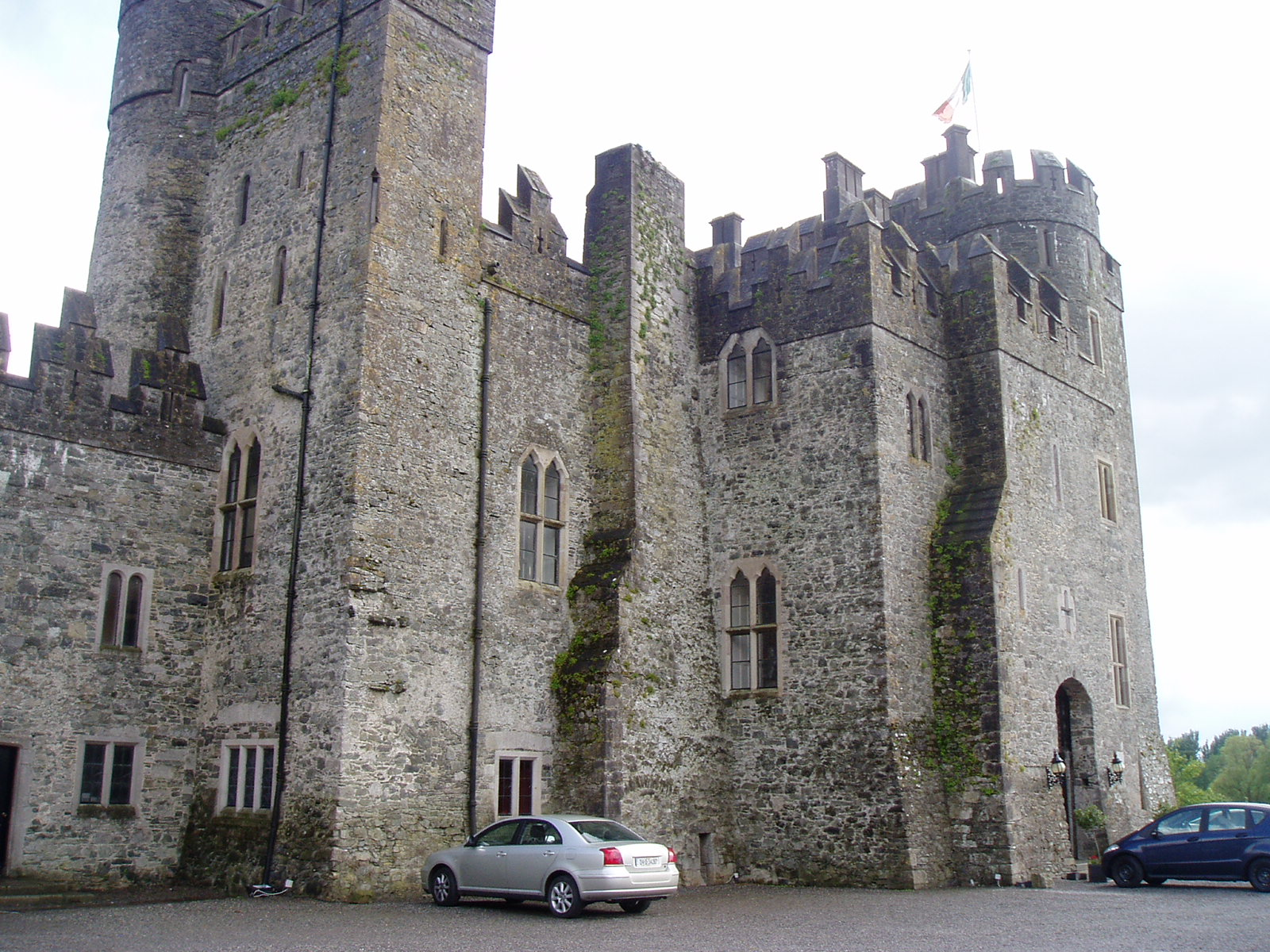
Kilkea Castle, the principal residence of Mabel Browne and Gerald FitzGerald as it appears today

On 28 May 1554, when she was about eighteen years old, Mabel married the eldest brother of her stepmother, Gerald FitzGerald, 11th Earl of Kildare, known as The Wizard Earl, whom she had met at the court of King Edward VI. According to historian Mary Anne Everett Green in her Royal and Illustrious Ladies, the pair actually met at a masked ball and Mabel immediately fell in love with him. FitzGerald was given his sobriquet on account of his interest in alchemy. They were married in the Chapel Royal during the reign of Queen Mary I, who held the Browne family in high esteem.

Mabel was a gentlewoman of Queen Mary's Privy Chamber, and in February, the same year of his marriage to Mabel, FitzGerald had helped suppress the rebellion of Sir Thomas Wyatt. Mabel went to live with her husband at Kilkea Castle, Kildare, in Ireland, the country where she was to spend most of her life. Together FitzGerald and Mabel had five children.

=== Issue ===
1. Lady Elizabeth FitzGerald (died 12 January 1617), married Donnchadh MacConchobhair O'Brien, 4th Earl of Thomond, by whom she had issue.
2. Lord Gerald FitzGerald, Lord Offaly, Lord Garratt (28 December 1559 Maynooth- June 1580), married in October 1578, Catherine Knollys, a granddaughter of Mary Boleyn. They had a daughter Lettice who married Sir Robert Digby. These were the direct ancestors of the celebrated 19th-century adventuress Jane Digby.
3. Lord Henry Na Tuagh FitzGerald, 12th Earl of Kildare, (1562- 1597 Drogheda), married Lady Frances Howard, by whom he had female issue.
4. Lord William FitzGerald, 13th Earl of Kildare (died April 1599)
5. Lady Mary FitzGerald (died 1 October 1610), married Christopher Nugent, 14th Baron Delvin, by whom she had issue.
6. Lady Mabel FitzGerald (b. 1564-d. 1587), married Dudley Bagenal, by whom she had issue.

== Recusant leanings ==
While Mabel had enjoyed the favour of Queen Mary, she was less welcome at the court of the latter's successor, Queen Elizabeth I, as Mabel's recusant leanings were well known. She kept a number of priests in her household, including her private chaplain Nicholas Eustace, who was related to the Catholic rebel James Eustace, 3rd Viscount Baltinglass, and she hired the suspected Father Compton to serve as the tutor of her children. She was also a close friend of Jane Dormer, Duchess of Feria, their friendship dating from the time when they had both served in the household of Queen Mary. According to author Vincent P. Carey, Mabel "maintained a refuge and library for the Jesuit missionary Robert Rochfort.

Despite her overt Roman Catholicism, Mabel was never accused of treason against Queen Elizabeth, unlike her husband who fell under increasing suspicion of disloyalty in his later years and spent several years in the Tower of London. Elizabeth however had a certain fondness for him and refused to take any decisive action against him. He died in London in 1585, technically a free man, though he was forbidden to leave the city.

== Death ==
Mabel died in Ireland on 25 August 1610. She was about seventy-four years of age. Her last years were greatly troubled by a lawsuit brought against her by her granddaughter Lettice Digby, alleging that Mabel had fraudulently tampered with her husband's will. Mabel admitted that the will had been altered but insisted that this had been done on legal advice.

== In fiction ==
Mabel Browne is a minor character in Anya Seton's historical romance Green Darkness, where her brother Sir Anthony Browne Viscount Montagu, his wife Magdalen Dacre, and Cowdray House are featured prominently.
