= Frances Howard, Countess of Kildare =

Noblewoman and Countess of Kildare (Born 21 Sep 1572 - Died 11 Jul 1628)

Frances Howard
- Countess of Kildare
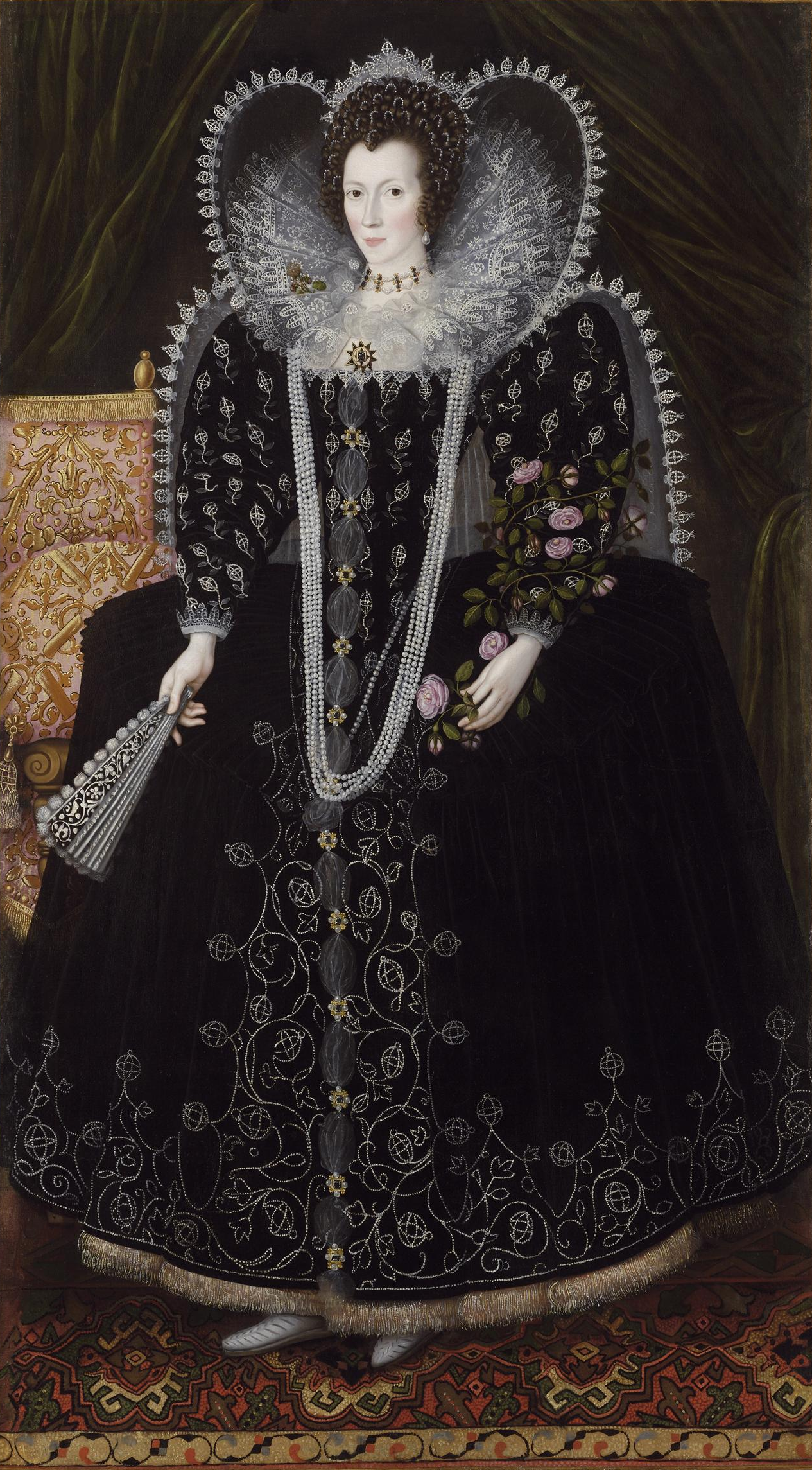
- Frances Howard in 1601
- Died: 1628
- Noble family: Howard
- Spouses: Henry FitzGerald, 12th Earl of Kildare; Henry Brooke, 11th Baron Cobham
- Issue: Bridget FitzGerald; Elizabeth FitzGerald
- Father: Charles Howard, 1st Earl of Nottingham
- Mother: Catherine Carey

Frances Howard, Countess of Kildare (died 1628), was a courtier and governess of Princess Elizabeth Stuart, Queen of Bohemia, and a member of the House of Howard.

== Marriages ==
Frances Howard was the daughter of Charles Howard, 1st Earl of Nottingham and Catherine Carey, Countess of Nottingham. She was a member of the household of Queen Elizabeth as a lady of the Privy Chamber. On New Year's Day 1589, she gave the queen a scarf of black cloth "flourished" with Venice gold and silver, in 1600 she gave seven gold buttons set with sparks of ruby and pearls.

She was married firstly to Henry FitzGerald, 12th Earl of Kildare (died 1597), and secondly in May 1601 to Henry Brooke, 11th Baron Cobham. Around the same time Cobham's brother George Brooke married Elizabeth Burgh, daughter of Lord Burgh. Rowland Whyte reported that the Queen approved their marriage plan in January 1600 and Howard and Brooke had secretly married in August 1600.

Rowland Whyte mentioned her several times in his newsletters to Robert Sidney. In November 1595, he described how Barbara Sidney was received at court and 'my Lord Admiral and all that tribe were glad to see her' and Lady Kildare was sent especially to keep her company and dine with her in Lady Hoby's chamber. Her husband the Earl of Kildare died, and in November 1598 Elizabeth gave her £700 to compensate the loss of her marriage jointure in Ireland.

In August 1599, Whyte heard that Margaret Radcliffe, a maid of honour, had stayed in her chamber for four days after Lady Kildare had been unkind to her because they were rivals for the affection of Lord Cobham. Radcliffe died in November 1599, after refusing to eat, and Ben Jonson as an epitaph wrote an acrostic epigram.

In August 1602 at the Harefield Entertainment in the lottery she was given a girdle, with the verses, "By fortune's girdle you may happy be: But they that are less happy are more free."

After her second marriage she retained the title "Lady Kildare". She signed an inventory of the wardrobe of Queen Elizabeth in December 1602 as "Frauncis Cobham of Kildare". The signature was for a gift from Queen Elizabeth of a black velvet gown embroidered with scallop shells and ragged pearls. The gown had originally been a gift to the Queen from the Earl of Warwick in 1578. It was altered for Lady Kildare by the queen's tailor William Jones, and the embroiderer John Parr sewed gold spangles and 150 pearls to a new bodice.

A note by one of Lord Cobham's household administrators blames Lady Kildare and her people for extra expenses on food.

== The Succession ==
Lady Kildare became involved in correspondence between English courtiers and James VI of Scotland before his succession to the throne of England. In September 1599 her Scottish servant named Dicksoun ingratiated himself with the Scottish diplomat James Sempill, and said she had spoken in favour of the king's succession to the English throne at dinner with her father the Lord Admiral. Sempill wrote that Kildare passed the paper knife to the queen to open the king's letters.

Henry Howard, 1st Earl of Northampton tried to break her Scottish connections, and wrote to Edward Bruce, 1st Lord Kinloss, asking if he could find out about three letters she had written to James before the fall of the Earl of Essex in February 1601. One asked if she could have a private cipher to write secret letters to the king, and Northampton heard she had a cipher to write to Sir Thomas Erskine. In the second she had offered to engineer the disgrace of Cecil and Walter Raleigh with Queen Elizabeth. In the third she warned James VI against Raleigh and the Master of Grey.

Northampton was keen to thwart Lady Kildare's involvement in international politics, and on 22 November 1601 wrote to the Earl of Mar about his difficulties with 'her entermeddelinge'. Northampton questioned her access to useful information, claiming 'hir owne sexe dare not speake before hir', incidentally giving insight into the political roles of ladies in waiting at Elizabeth's court.

In 1601 Kildare took a letter from Christian Annesley, Lady Sandys, sister of Cordell Annesley, to the queen to plead for Lord Sandys, who was pardoned for supporting Essex. Lady Raleigh complained to Robert Cecil in March 1602 that Kildare was damaging her reputation with the queen.

Lady Kildare was said to have told Dr Henry Parry that on her deathbed, Queen Elizabeth was wearing a ring that Earl of Essex had given her, and not her coronation ring.

== Berwick and Edinburgh ==
After the succession Lord Cobham and the Earl of Northampton travelled to Berwick upon Tweed to greet King James on 7 April 1603. The letter writer John Chamberlain said that Lord Henry Howard (Northampton) went to Scotland to "countermine the Lord Cobham", to possess the king's ear and prevent Cobham gaining royal favour.

Frances, Lady Kildare also came to Berwick with other courtiers in an official party to welcome Anne of Denmark. These were chosen by the Privy Council, following the king's order of 15 April 1603. The group consisted of two countesses, Kildare, and Elizabeth, Countess of Worcester; two baronesses Philadelphia, Lady Scrope and Penelope, Lady Rich; and two ladies Anne Herbert, a daughter of Henry Herbert, 2nd Earl of Pembroke, and Audrey Walsingham. A Venetian diplomat, Giovanni Carlo Scaramelli, wrote that the six great ladies were escorted by 200 horsemen. There were also two maids of honour.

Kildare, as William, Lord Compton reported to Cecil, left the official party at Berwick on 27 May and travelled on to Edinburgh to meet Anne of Denmark, writing "my lady Kildare would needs quit her companions at Berwick and went to Edinburgh". Others made the same journey, hoping to gain the queen's favour, including Lucy Russell, Countess of Bedford. The queen came from Stirling Castle to Edinburgh and met a convoy of English ladies, and on 31 May 1603 attended church in Edinburgh accompanied by these would-be companions. Some of the English ladies were accommodated in John Kinloch's house in the Canongate, near Holyroodhouse, and the cost of their stay was met by the Scottish chancellor, John Graham, 3rd Earl of Montrose.

== Governess to Princess Elizabeth ==
On 3 June 1603, the queen arrived in England welcomed by the remaining ladies of the official party. Kildare was made the governess of Princess Elizabeth on 5/15 June 1603, despite Northampton's efforts to discredit her, and sworn a Lady of the Queen's Privy Chamber two weeks later. A later memoir, which has a very favourable view of Kildare, states she had a letter from the king to the queen recommending her to "constantly attend Princess Elizabeth, who burst into tears at the news of this change of governess. The memoir also states that Lady Kildare's great affection for Lord Cobham was not reciprocated.

Princess Elizabeth arrived at Windsor Castle in a litter with Lady Kildare and 30 horses in procession on 1 July 1603. Kildare's father, the Earl of Nottingham, visited her and Prince Henry and Princess Elizabeth at Oatlands in September 1603. An account of expenses made by Anne Livingstone, one of the ladies-in-waiting, or by Princess Elizabeth herself, mentions Kildare's footman and wagon-man, and that Kildare sent away some male servant when plague was suspected.

== Disgrace ==
In September 1603, she lost this position four months after her husband was named in the 'Bye Plot' and 'Main Plot'. It was said she urged her husband to testify against Raleigh to save himself. Howard wrote to Cecil blaming and implicating her brother-in-law Sir George Brooke. Arbella Stuart wrote on 16 September, "Kildare is discharged of her office, and as near a free woman as may be and have a bad husband." The keeping of Cobham Hall and park was given to Miles Rainsford, a valet of the king's privy chamber.

A later memoir states that although Cobham had been unkind to Howard, she became sick with worry at his arrest, leading to her replacement as governess, and a letter of Thomas Edmondes explained 'her spyrittes have been of late much troubled with her husbande's disaster'. She wrote to her husband in October 1603, apologising that she could not send a message to court to intercede for him, because King James and Anne of Denmark were away on progress and she did not know where, the "king is gone one way, the queen another, and the house [household] remains at Basing". After his trial at Winchester, Lord Cobham was not executed but remained in Tower for years, dying in 1618.

== Investigating a family archive ==
Robert Cecil required her husband's papers, and she first wrote to him for more specific details. Lord Cobham apologised to Cecil after she had sent the wrong papers from a cabinet at Cobham. Lord Cobham noted that there many old papers from the embassy of Sir Henry Cobham to France which he had never looked through. He felt that Kildare had let him down deliberately and compared her to the biblical Jezabel.

Kildare offered Cecil her husband's papers from their house in Blackfriars. Some were state papers, which she wrote were no concern of women, and she would like to be acquitted of keeping them:

ther ar so manny papars and writtings cast and lad (laid) about that if it might ples (please) you[r] lordship I shwld be very glad to be holy (wholly) dispossest of them for that manny letters consarne foren (foreign) cases, were of wes (whereof use) might be maed, thee (they) ar un fit for women to see or men of mene jugement for thee (they) concarne state causis, I shwld be much bound to your lordship if you wolld procour a commanddyment from the king that I shwld be frely acquitted of them all if anyn evidences consarne me, I presume of your hannorabell concenes to rit me in all things.

== Later life ==
After her husband's death, Kildare was a 'countess assistant' at the funeral of Anne of Denmark in 1619, a sign of rehabilitation.

Her daughter, Bridget, married Rory O'Donnell, 1st Earl of Tyrconnell, and secondly Nicholas Barnewall, 1st Viscount Barnewall. Her other daughter, Elizabeth, married Luke Plunket, 1st Earl of Fingall. Lady Kildare lived at Cobham Hall and Deptford. She borrowed another house at Deptford belonging to the East India Company to entertain the poor of the neighbourhood at Christmas in 1623, and had done the company 'some favours'.

On 9 September 1627 she visited Sir John Coke, the Master of Requests, to ask a favour. The Earl of Dorset wrote to Coke recommending her and suggesting good manners were required, "She is a lady out of date, and therefore I may more confidently intercede in her behalf, bur she has strains in her of the ancient nobility, and is one who will deserve all courtesy".

She died in 1627. According to her will Anne Arundell of Wardour Castle was a particular friend.
