= Henry FitzGerald, 12th Earl of Kildare =

Irish earl

Henry FitzGerald, 12th Earl of Kildare (1562 – 30 September 1597) was an Irish peer and soldier.

== Background ==
Kildare was the second son of Gerald FitzGerald, 11th Earl of Kildare and Mabel Browne. His eldest brother died in 1580, and Henry inherited the earldom in 1585.

== Military career ==
Nicknamed Henry "na Tuagh", or Henry "of the Battleaxes", he fought against the Spanish invaders in Ireland in 1588. In 1597, he helped quell the Earl of Tyrone's uprising in Ulster, where he was mortally wounded. Wounded in a skirmish on the Blackwater in July 1597, he was brought to Drogheda where he died of his wounds on 30 September 1597.

== Family ==
Kildare married Frances, daughter of Charles Howard, 1st Earl of Nottingham and Katherine Carey, in 1589. They had no sons, and Kildare was succeeded by his brother William FitzGerald, 13th Earl of Kildare. He had at least two surviving daughters:

- Bridget, (c. 1590 – died between 1661 and 1683), married firstly Rory O'Donnell, 1st Earl of Tyrconnell, and secondly Nicholas Barnewall, 1st Viscount Barnewall and had children from both marriages.
- Elizabeth, who married Luke Plunkett, 1st Earl of Fingall, when he was still Baron Killeen. She died in London in 1611, whereas her widowed husband married three more times and became Earl of Fingall in 1628.

== Notes ==
Peerage of Ireland
Preceded by Gerald FitzGerald	Earl of Kildare; 1585–1597	Succeeded by William FitzGerald
