= Earl of Brentford =

Title in the Peerage of England

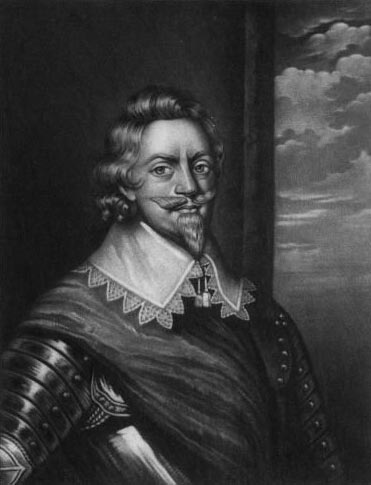
Patrick Ruthven, 1st Earl of Brentford.

Earl of Brentford was a title that was created twice in Peerage of England. It was first created in 1644 when the Scottish soldier and diplomat Patrick Ruthven, 1st Earl of Forth, was made Earl of Brentford, in the County of Middlesex. He had already been created Lord Ruthven of Ettrick in 1639 and Earl of Forth in 1642, both in the Peerage of Scotland. He had no surviving male issue and the titles became extinct on his death in 1651. Lord Brentford was a great-grandson of William Ruthven, 1st Lord Ruthven (see Earl of Gowrie for earlier history of the family). His brother William Ruthven was the grandfather of Francis Ruthven, who was created a Baronet, of Redcastle, in 1666 (see Ruthven Baronets). The latter married Elizabeth, daughter of Thomas Ruthven, 1st Lord Ruthven of Freeland, great-grandson of William Ruthven, 2nd Lord Ruthven. Their daughter, Isabel (or Isobel), succeeded as 5th Lady Ruthven of Freeland in 1722 (see Lord Ruthven of Freeland for further history of this title).

The second creation of the earldom of Brentford came in 1689 in favour of Frederick Schomberg, who was also created Duke of Schomberg. For more information on this creation of the earldom, see Duke of Schomberg.

== Earls of Brentford; First creation (1644) ==
- Patrick Ruthven, 1st Earl of Brentford (d. 1651)
  - Alexander Ruthven, Lord Ruthven (d. between 1642 and 1649)
    - Patrick Ruthven
  - Patrick Ruthven, Lord Ruthven (1648–1650)

== Earls of Brentford; Second creation (1689) ==
- Duke of Schomberg

FitzGerald family tree: Earls of Kildare, Dukes of Leinster and Schomberg, Marquesses of Kildare and Barons Rayleigh

Gerald de Windsor	Nest ferch Rhys
Maurice FitzGerald c. 1105–1176; Lord of Lanstephan
Baron Offaly, 1175
Gerald FitzMaurice c. 1150–1204; 1st Lord of Offaly	Thomas FitzMaurice c. 1175–1213; Lord of O'Connelloe
Maurice FitzGerald; 1194–1257; 2nd Lord of Offaly	Earl of Desmond
Maurice FitzGerald; 3rd Lord of Offaly; 1238–c. 1286	Thomas FitzGerald d. 1271
Earl of Kildare, 1316
John FitzGerald; 1250–1316; 1st Earl of Kildare, 4th Lord of Offaly
Thomas FitzGerald d. 1328; 2nd Earl of Kildare
Richard FitzGerald; 1317–1329; 3rd Earl of Kildare	Maurice FitzGerald; 1318–1390; 4th Earl of Kildare
Gerald FitzGerald d. 1432; 5th Earl of Kildare	John FitzGerald d. 1434; 6th Earl of Kildare
Thomas FitzGerald c. 1421–1478; 7th Earl of Kildare
Gerald FitzGerald c. 1456–1513; 8th Earl of Kildare
Gerald FitzGerald; 1487–1534; 9th Earl of Kildare
Earl of Kildare (2nd creation), 1554; Ancient earldom restored, 1569
Thomas FitzGerald; 1513–1537; 10th Earl of Kildare	Gerald FitzGerald; 1525–1585; 1st & 11th Earl of Kildare	Edward FitzGerald; 1528–1590
Kildare earldom (1st creation) forfeit, 1537
King James VI & I 1566–1625	Henry FitzGerald; 1562–1597; 2nd & 12th Earl of Kildare	William FitzGerald c. 1563–1599; 3rd & 13th Earl of Kildare	Gerald FitzGerald d. 1612; 14th Earl of Kildare	Thomas FitzGerald c. 1560–1619
Elizabeth Stuart; 1596–1662	King Charles I 1600–1649	Gerald FitzGerald; 1611–1620; 15th Earl of Kildare	George FitzGerald; 1612–1660; 16th Earl of Kildare
Duke of Schomberg, Marquess of Harwich, Earl of Brentford and Baron Teyes, 1689
Charles Louis; 1617–1680; Elector Palatine	Frederick Schomberg; 1615–1690; 1st Duke of Schomberg, etc., Count of Mértola (Portugal)	King Charles II; 1630–1685	Wentworth FitzGerald; 1634–1664; 17th Earl of Kildare	Robert FitzGerald; 1638–1698
Duke of Leinster (1st creation), Earl of Bangor, Baron Tara, of Bellinter in the County of Meath, 1691
Raugravine Caroline Elisabeth; 1659–1696	Meinhardt Schomberg; 1641–1719; 3rd Duke of Schomberg, etc., Duke of Leinster, etc., Count of Mértola (Portugal)	Charles Schomberg; 1645–1693; 2nd Duke of Schomberg, etc., Count of Mértola (Portugal)	Charles Lennox; 1672–1723; Duke of Richmond	John FitzGerald; 1661–1707; 18th Earl of Kildare	Robert FitzGerald; 1675–1744; 19th Earl of Kildare
Dukedom of Leinster (1st creation) and Dukedom of Schomberg extinct, 1719
Charles Lennox; 1701–1750; Duke of Richmond
Viscount Leinster, of Taplow in the County of Buckingham, 1747; Marquess of Kildare and Earl of Offaly, 1761; Duke of Leinster (2nd creation), 1766
Emily Lennox; 1731–1814	James FitzGerald; 1722–1773; 1st Duke of Leinster, etc., 20th Earl of Kildare
Baron Lecale	Baron Rayleigh
George FitzGerald; 1748–1765 styled Earl of Offaly	William Robert FitzGerald; 1749–1804; 2nd Duke of Leinster, etc., 21st Earl of Kildare	Charles James FitzGerald; 1756–1810; Baron Lecale	Charlotte Strutt; 1758–1836; 1st Baroness Rayleigh
Lecale barony extinct, 1810
George FitzGerald; 1783–1784 styled Marquess of Kildare	Augustus Frederick FitzGerald; 1791–1874; 3rd Duke of Leinster, etc., 22nd Earl of Kildare	John James Strutt; 1796–1873; 2nd Baron Rayleigh
Baron Kildare, 1870
Charles William FitzGerald; 1819–1887; 4th Duke of Leinster, etc., 23rd Earl of Kildare, 1st Baron Kildare
Gerald FitzGerald; 1851–1893; 5th Duke of Leinster, etc., 24th Earl of Kildare, 2nd Baron Kildare	John William Strutt; 1842–1919; 3rd Baron Rayleigh
Maurice FitzGerald; 1887–1922; 6th Duke of Leinster, etc., 25th Earl of Kildare, 3rd Baron Kildare	Desmond FitzGerald; 1888–1916	Edward FitzGerald; 1892–1976; 7th Duke of Leinster, etc., 26th Earl of Kildare, 4th Baron Kildare	Robert John Strutt; 1875–1947; 4th Baron Rayleigh
Gerald FitzGerald; 1914–2004; 8th Duke of Leinster, etc., 27th Earl of Kildare, 5th Baron Kildare	John Arthur Strutt; 1908–1988; 5th Baron Rayleigh
Maurice FitzGerald b. 1948; 9th Duke of Leinster, etc., 28th Earl of Kildare, 6th Baron Kildare	John FitzGerald; 1952–2015	John Gerald Strutt b. 1960; 6th Baron Rayleigh
Thomas FitzGerald; 1974–1997 styled Earl of Offaly	Edward FitzGerald b. 1988	John Frederick Strutt b. 1993
Heir presumptive to the Leinster dukedom	Heir apparent to the Barony Rayleigh

== See also ==
- Earl of Gowrie
- Lord Ruthven of Freeland
- Viscount Brentford
- Baroness Brentford
