= Duke of Schomberg =

English nobility title

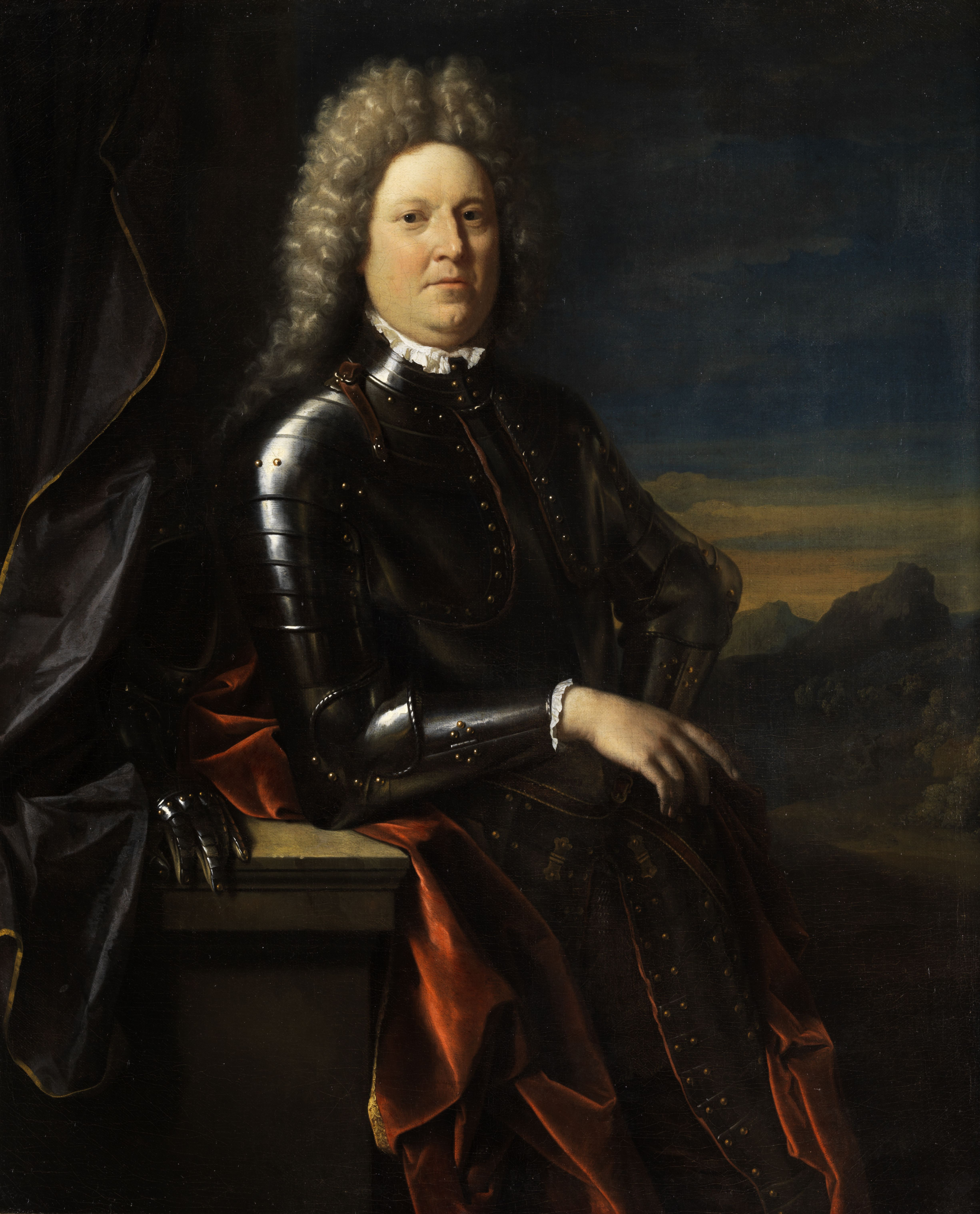
Portrait Friedrich von Schomberg/Schönberg (1615–1690)

Duke of Schomberg in the Peerage of England was created in 1689. The title derives from the surname of its holder (originally Schönberg).

The Duke of Schomberg was part of King William of Orange's army and camped in the Holywood hills area of Craigantlet in Northern Ireland. The area is now a farm and the house that King William himself stayed in is now formally known as "Schomberg Cottage".

== Dukes of Schomberg (1689) ==
Other titles: Marquess of Harwich, Earl of Brentford and Baron Teyes (1689)

- Maréchal Frederick Schomberg, 1st Duke of Schomberg (1615–1690), military commander in the Williamite War in Ireland
- Charles Schomberg, 2nd Duke of Schomberg (1645–1693), younger son of the 1st Duke, was also a general

Other titles (3rd Duke): Duke of Leinster, Earl of Bangor and Baron of Tara (En 1690)

- Meinhardt Schomberg, 3rd Duke of Schomberg, 1st Duke of Leinster (1641–1719), elder son of the 1st Duke, was also a general. He died without surviving male issue and his titles all became extinct
  - Charles Schomberg, Marquess of Harwich (1683–1713), only son of the 3rd Duke, died from consumption before his father

== Family tree ==
FitzGerald family tree: Earls of Kildare, Dukes of Leinster and Schomberg, Marquesses of Kildare and Barons Rayleigh

Gerald de Windsor	Nest ferch Rhys
Maurice FitzGerald c. 1105–1176; Lord of Lanstephan
Baron Offaly, 1175
Gerald FitzMaurice c. 1150–1204; 1st Lord of Offaly	Thomas FitzMaurice c. 1175–1213; Lord of O'Connelloe
Maurice FitzGerald; 1194–1257; 2nd Lord of Offaly	Earl of Desmond
Maurice FitzGerald; 3rd Lord of Offaly; 1238–c. 1286	Thomas FitzGerald d. 1271
Earl of Kildare, 1316
John FitzGerald; 1250–1316; 1st Earl of Kildare, 4th Lord of Offaly
Thomas FitzGerald d. 1328; 2nd Earl of Kildare
Richard FitzGerald; 1317–1329; 3rd Earl of Kildare	Maurice FitzGerald; 1318–1390; 4th Earl of Kildare
Gerald FitzGerald d. 1432; 5th Earl of Kildare	John FitzGerald d. 1434; 6th Earl of Kildare
Thomas FitzGerald c. 1421–1478; 7th Earl of Kildare
Gerald FitzGerald c. 1456–1513; 8th Earl of Kildare
Gerald FitzGerald; 1487–1534; 9th Earl of Kildare
Earl of Kildare (2nd creation), 1554; Ancient earldom restored, 1569
Thomas FitzGerald; 1513–1537; 10th Earl of Kildare	Gerald FitzGerald; 1525–1585; 1st & 11th Earl of Kildare	Edward FitzGerald; 1528–1590
Kildare earldom (1st creation) forfeit, 1537
King James VI & I 1566–1625	Henry FitzGerald; 1562–1597; 2nd & 12th Earl of Kildare	William FitzGerald c. 1563–1599; 3rd & 13th Earl of Kildare	Gerald FitzGerald d. 1612; 14th Earl of Kildare	Thomas FitzGerald c. 1560–1619
Elizabeth, Queen of Bohemia; 1596–1662	King Charles I 1600–1649	Gerald FitzGerald; 1611–1620; 15th Earl of Kildare	George FitzGerald; 1612–1660; 16th Earl of Kildare
Duke of Schomberg, Marquess of Harwich, Earl of Brentford and Baron Teyes, 1689
Charles Louis; 1617–1680; Elector Palatine	Frederick Schomberg; 1615–1690; 1st Duke of Schomberg, etc., Count of Mértola (Portugal)	King Charles II; 1630–1685	Wentworth FitzGerald; 1634–1664; 17th Earl of Kildare	Robert FitzGerald; 1638–1698
Duke of Leinster (1st creation), Earl of Bangor, Baron Tara, of Bellinter in the County of Meath, 1691
Raugravine Caroline Elisabeth; 1659–1696	Meinhardt Schomberg; 1641–1719; 3rd Duke of Schomberg, etc., Duke of Leinster, etc., Count of Mértola (Portugal)	Charles Schomberg; 1645–1693; 2nd Duke of Schomberg, etc., Count of Mértola (Portugal)	Charles Lennox; 1672–1723; Duke of Richmond	John FitzGerald; 1661–1707; 18th Earl of Kildare	Robert FitzGerald; 1675–1744; 19th Earl of Kildare
Dukedom of Leinster (1st creation) and Dukedom of Schomberg extinct, 1719
Charles Lennox; 1701–1750; Duke of Richmond
Viscount Leinster, of Taplow in the County of Buckingham, 1747; Marquess of Kildare and Earl of Offaly, 1761; Duke of Leinster (2nd creation), 1766
Emily Lennox; 1731–1814	James FitzGerald; 1722–1773; 1st Duke of Leinster, etc., 20th Earl of Kildare
Baron Lecale	Baron Rayleigh
George FitzGerald; 1748–1765 styled Earl of Offaly	William Robert FitzGerald; 1749–1804; 2nd Duke of Leinster, etc., 21st Earl of Kildare	Charles James FitzGerald; 1756–1810; Baron Lecale	Charlotte Strutt; 1758–1836; 1st Baroness Rayleigh
Lecale barony extinct, 1810
George FitzGerald; 1783–1784 styled Marquess of Kildare	Augustus Frederick FitzGerald; 1791–1874; 3rd Duke of Leinster, etc., 22nd Earl of Kildare	John James Strutt; 1796–1873; 2nd Baron Rayleigh
Baron Kildare, 1870
Charles William FitzGerald; 1819–1887; 4th Duke of Leinster, etc., 23rd Earl of Kildare, 1st Baron Kildare
Gerald FitzGerald; 1851–1893; 5th Duke of Leinster, etc., 24th Earl of Kildare, 2nd Baron Kildare	John William Strutt; 1842–1919; 3rd Baron Rayleigh
Maurice FitzGerald; 1887–1922; 6th Duke of Leinster, etc., 25th Earl of Kildare, 3rd Baron Kildare	Lord Desmond FitzGerald; 1888–1916	Edward FitzGerald; 1892–1976; 7th Duke of Leinster, etc., 26th Earl of Kildare, 4th Baron Kildare	Robert John Strutt; 1875–1947; 4th Baron Rayleigh
Gerald FitzGerald; 1914–2004; 8th Duke of Leinster, etc., 27th Earl of Kildare, 5th Baron Kildare	John Arthur Strutt; 1908–1988; 5th Baron Rayleigh
Maurice FitzGerald b. 1948; 9th Duke of Leinster, etc., 28th Earl of Kildare, 6th Baron Kildare	John FitzGerald; 1952–2015	John Gerald Strutt b. 1960; 6th Baron Rayleigh
Thomas FitzGerald; 1974–1997 styled Earl of Offaly	Edward FitzGerald b. 1988	John Frederick Strutt b. 1993
Heir presumptive to the Leinster dukedom	Heir apparent to the Barony Rayleigh

== Arms ==
Coat of arms of Duke of Schomberg
Coronet Coronet of a Duke Crest 1st: An Arm in armour embowed holding in the hand all proper, a Battle-axe Argent; 2nd: Out of a Ducal Coronet and between two Elephant’s Trunks Or, a Talbot sejant affrontée Sable; 3rd: Out of a Ducal Coronet Or, three Peacock Feathers proper. Escutcheon Quarterly: 1st & 4th, Argent, on an Inescutcheon Sable, an Escarbuncle of eight rays Or; 2nd & 3rd, Gules, six Escutcheons Argent, three, two and one; over all an Escutcheon of Pretence, Gules, a Cavalier in armour proper, mounted on a Horse in full course Argent, holding in his right hand a Battle-axe Argent. Supporters On either side a Lion segreant proper.

== See also ==
- Duke of Leinster
