= Gerald Fitzgerald =

Gerald Fitzgerald may refer to:

- Gerald Fitzgerald, Lord of Offaly (died 1204)
- Gerald FitzGerald, 5th Duke of Leinster (1851–1893), Irish peer
- Gerald FitzGerald, 8th Duke of Leinster (1914–2004), Irish peer
- Gerald FitzGerald, 3rd Earl of Desmond (1335–1398)
- Gerald FitzGerald, 14th Earl of Desmond (c. 1533–1583), leader of the Irish rebellion of 1579
- Gerald FitzGerald, 5th Earl of Kildare (died 1432), Irish peer
- Gerald FitzGerald, 8th Earl of Kildare (c. 1456–1513)
- Gerald FitzGerald, 9th Earl of Kildare (1487–1534)
- Gerald FitzGerald, 11th Earl of Kildare (1525–1585)
- Gerald FitzGerald, 14th Earl of Kildare (died 1612), Irish peer
- Gerald FitzGerald, 15th Earl of Kildare (1611–1620)
- Gerald Fitzgerald, 3rd Lord Decies (died 1553)
- Gerald Fitzgerald (artist) (1873–1935), Australian watercolourist
- Gerald Fitzgerald (priest) (1894–1969), American clergyman
- Gerald FitzGerald, Dean of Lismore from 1564 to 1583
- Gerald FitzGerald, (1821–1886), son of the Duke of Leinster
- Gerald F. Fitzgerald, (1925–2010), American banking magnate

== See also ==
- Gerard George Fitzgerald (1834–1904), New Zealand politician, in some sources misspelled as Gerald Fitzgerald
- Garret FitzGerald (disambiguation), alternative anglicisation of the same Irish name
