= Duke of Leinster =

Highest-ranking noble title in the Peerage of Ireland

Dukedom of Leinster
- Argent a saltire gules
- Creation date: 26 November 1766
- Created by: King George III
- Peerage: Peerage of Ireland
- First holder: James FitzGerald, 1st Marquess of Kildare
- Present holder: Maurice FitzGerald, 9th Duke
- Heir presumptive: Edward FitzGerald (nephew of the present holder)
- Remainder to: the 1st Duke's heirs male of the body lawfully begotten
- Subsidiary titles: Marquess of Kildare; Earl of Kildare; Earl of Offaly; Viscount Leinster; Baron of Offaly; Baron Offaly; Baron Kildare
- Former seats: Maynooth Castle; Kilkea Castle; Leinster House; Carton House

Duke of Leinster (/ˈlɪnstər/; Irish: Diúc Laighean) is a title that has been created twice in the Peerage of Ireland since 1691. It does not include any territorial landholdings and does not produce any revenue for the title-holder.

Currently Duke of Leinster is the premier dukedom in the Peerage of Ireland. The subsidiary titles of the Duke of Leinster are Marquess of Kildare (1761), Earl of Kildare (1316), Earl of Offaly (1761), Viscount Leinster, of Taplow in the County of Buckingham (1747), Baron of Offaly (c. 1193), Baron Offaly (1620) and Baron Kildare, of Kildare in the County of Kildare (1870). The viscounty of Leinster is in the Peerage of Great Britain, the barony of Kildare in the Peerage of the United Kingdom, and all other titles in the Peerage of Ireland. The courtesy title of the eldest son and heir of the Duke of Leinster is Marquess of Kildare. The Duke of Leinster is the head of the House of Kildare.

== Duke of Leinster, first creation (1691) ==
The title was first conferred on General Meinhardt Schomberg, later the 3rd Duke of Schomberg, K.G. (1641–1719) in 1691. Schomberg was created Duke of Leinster for his part in the Battle on 30 June 1690 and, after taking part in the abortive Siege of Limerick in August 1690, he became a British subject through naturalization by Act of Parliament on 25 April 1691. However, that creation became extinct upon Schomberg's death in July 1719.

- See Duke of Schomberg

== Dukes of Leinster, second creation (1766) ==
For the second creation, it was granted to Major-General James FitzGerald, 1st Marquess of Kildare, Master-General of the Irish Ordnance, in 1766. FitzGerald married to Lady Emily Lennox, the great-granddaughter of King Charles II of the Royal House of Stuart.

=== Earls of Kildare from 1316 ===
This branch of the Cambro Norman FitzGerald/FitzMaurice dynasty, which came to Ireland in 1169, were initially created Earls of Kildare. The earldom was created in 1316 for John FitzGerald. Two senior FitzGeralds, Garret Mór FitzGerald and his son, Garret Óg FitzGerald served as Lords Deputy of Ireland, the representative of the Lord of Ireland (the King of England) in Ireland. The tenth earl, Thomas FitzGerald, known as Silken Thomas, was attainted and his honours were forfeit in 1537. In 1554, Thomas's half-brother and only male heir, Gerald FitzGerald, was created Earl of Kildare in the Peerage of Ireland. He was subsequently restored to the original letters patent in 1569, as 11th earl. The second (1554-created) earldom became extinct in 1599, although the original earldom survived.

== Estates and residences ==
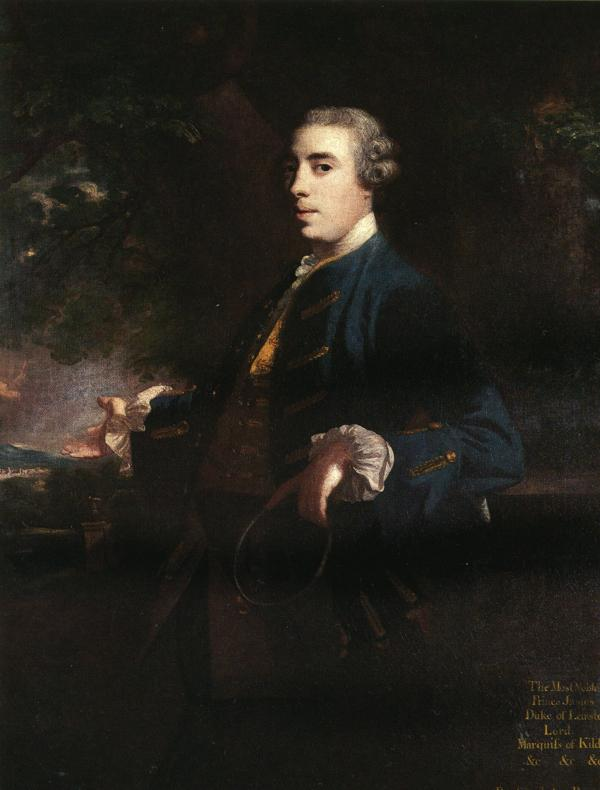
James FitzGerald, 1st Duke of Leinster

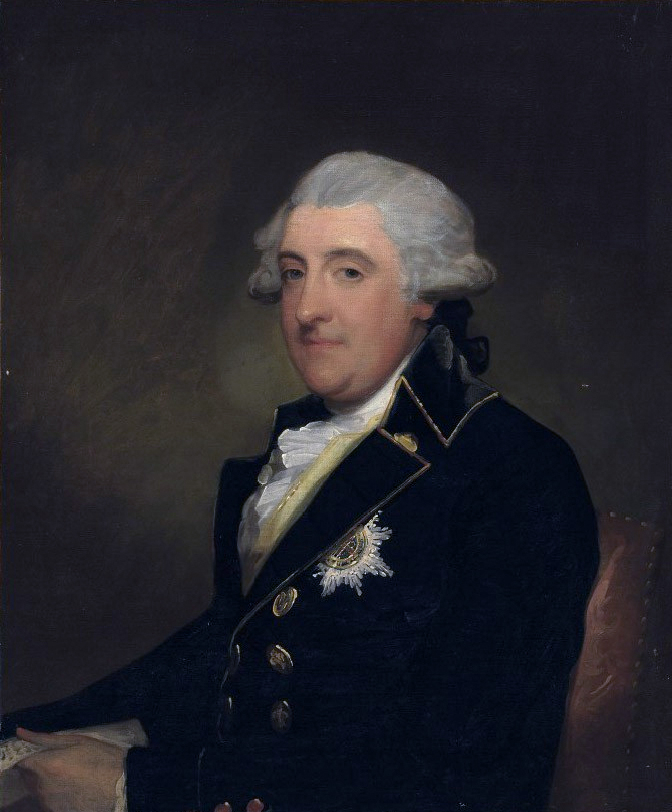
William FitzGerald, 2nd Duke of Leinster

=== Country seats ===
The family was originally based in Maynooth Castle in Maynooth in County Kildare. In later centuries the family owned estates in County Waterford with their country residence being a Georgian house called Carton House which had replaced the castle in County Kildare.

The Dukes of Leinster had by the early 20th century lost all their property and wealth. Their Carton House seat was sold (though one of Ireland's most historic buildings with perfectly preserved 18th century grounds, it was controversially turned into a hotel and golf course in the late 1990s by the current owner in an act condemned by environmentalists), as later on was their other residence in Waterford. The family now live in a smaller property in Ramsden, Oxfordshire.

=== Estates ===
In the 1883 edition of John Bateman's The Great Landowners of Great Britain and Ireland, Charles FitzGerald, 4th Duke of Leinster's estates were recorded as spanning 73,100 acres across Ireland, including 71,977 acres in County Kildare and 1,123 acres in County Meath, which produced a combined annual income of £55,877.

=== Dublin residences ===
In Dublin, the Earl built a large townhouse residence on the southside of Dublin called Kildare House. When the Earl was awarded a dukedom and became Duke of Leinster, the house was renamed Leinster House. One of its occupants was Lord Edward FitzGerald, who became an icon for Irish nationalism through his involvement with the Irish Rebellion of 1798, which ultimately cost him his life.

Leinster House was sold by the Leinsters in 1815. After nearly a century as the headquarters of the Royal Dublin Society, which held its famed Spring Show and Horse Show in its grounds, Oireachtas Éireann, the two chamber parliament of the new Irish Free State, rented Leinster House in 1922 to be its temporary parliament house. In 1924 it bought the building for parliamentary use. It has remained the parliament house of the Irish state.

=== London residences ===
Following the demolition of Carlton House in 1826, Augustus FitzGerald, 3rd Duke of Leinster was one of the original lessees who occupied one of the large terraced mansions at Carlton House Terrace which was built on the site during the late 1820s. The 3rd Duke took a lease of No. 6 Carlton House Terrace on 25 December 1829, and had taken up residence in the house by April 1832.

No. 6 Carlton House Terrace house remainded as the London home of the Dukes of Leinster until 1889. An auction of the house's contents was held in August 1889, and by July 1890 the house was occupied by the artist and explorer Herbert Ward. Following the death of Gerald FitzGerald, 5th Duke of Leinster in December 1893, his obituary in The Daily Telegraph listed No. 6 Carlton House Terrace as one of his residences, although by the date of the Duke's death the house had been leased by Marie Mackay, the widow of American millionaire John William Mackay.

== Title dispute ==
A controversial claim by claimants who say they are descended from Gerald FitzGerald, 5th Duke of Leinster, which is reported to have been largely debunked by Michael Estorick in 1981, was made in 2006 and subsequently failed.

In 2005, a claim was filed with the Department of Constitutional Affairs by Theresa Pamella Caudill, daughter of Eleanor and Maurice F. "Desmond" FitzGerald, on behalf of her nephew, a California builder, Paul FitzGerald, as claimant to be the rightful Duke of Leinster. FitzGerald was claimed to be the grandson of Major Lord Desmond FitzGerald (1888–1916), the second son of the 5th Duke of Leinster, who was recorded as having been killed in action during the First World War, while serving with the Irish Guards. When Maurice, 6th Duke of Leinster, died childless, in February 1922, the Leinster dukedom and its considerable wealth and estates devolved upon his youngest brother, Lord Edward FitzGerald, who succeeded as the 7th Duke. However, Paul FitzGerald's supporters claimed that Lord Desmond had faked his death and emigrated to California, by way of Winnipeg, Canada, where he lived until his death in 1967. It was further claimed by Mrs Caudill that a package of documents, witnessed by Edward, Prince of Wales (later Edward VIII), Sir Edgar Vincent, and Lord Feversham, had been lodged by her father with the Crown Office of the House of Lords in 1929, and the family had been denied access to them. Mrs Caudill believed the documents included evidence that her father had agreed to relinquish the title for his own generation but had insisted that it was to be passed down to his son, her brother Leonard FitzGerald. Instead, it had remained in the family of the 7th Duke. She claimed that an archivist had acknowledged the package existed, but said the official line was that it was now lost.

In February 2006, Lord Falconer of Thoroton, Lord Chancellor (2003–2007), and Harriet Harman, Minister of State in the Department for Constitutional Affairs, considered this claim after a 30-year campaign by Paul FitzGerald's family reported to have cost £1.3 million, and dismissed it. They adjudicated that the title was to remain with the existing holder, Maurice FitzGerald. Paul FitzGerald had a right of appeal against the Lord Chancellor's verdict only by petitioning the monarch.

In 2010, DNA evidence was presented that indicated that Paul FitzGerald was related to the wife of the 5th Duke, the former Lady Hermione Duncombe. As reported in The Scotsman,

With the help of Dunfermline-based genealogist Lloyd Pitcairn, Mrs FitzGerald Caudill [Paul FitzGerald's aunt] traced Maud Crawford, the grand-daughter of Lady Hermione's younger sister Urica Duncombe.

The results of the tests found that it was "41 times more probable" that Ms Crawford and Paul FitzGerald were extremely closely related than that they were from different families. The proof that Paul FitzGerald is related to the ducal family is the first DNA evidence produced in the case, and it supports Mrs Fitz-Gerald Caudhill's claim that her mysterious father was the son of Lady Hermione, the wife of the fifth Duke of Leinster.

Theresa Pamella Caudill died on July 25, 2015.

It had also previously been alleged that Edward FitzGerald, who succeeded as 7th Duke, was the biological son of the 11th Earl of Wemyss (1857–1937). Were this to be established, then neither the present Duke nor any other descendant of his grandfather, the 7th Duke, would be a legitimate heir of the 1st Duke of Leinster.

== List of titleholders ==
=== Earls of Kildare (1316) ===
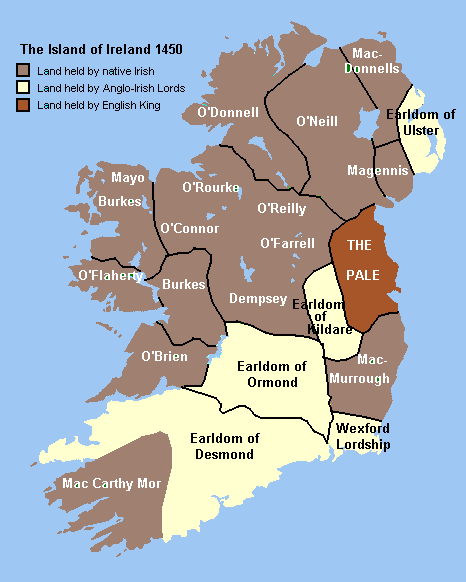
Ireland in 1450, with the Earldom of Kildare shown just southwest of the Pale

Other titles: Baron of Offaly (c. 1193)

- John FitzGerald, 1st Earl of Kildare (1250–1316), already 4th Baron of Offaly, was rewarded for serving Edward I of England in Scotland
- Thomas FitzGerald, 2nd Earl of Kildare (died 1328), younger (only surviving) son of the 1st Earl
  - John FitzGerald (1314–1323), eldest son of the 2nd Earl, died in childhood
- Richard FitzGerald, 3rd Earl of Kildare (1317–1329), second son of the 2nd Earl, died unmarried
- Maurice FitzGerald, 4th Earl of Kildare (1318–1390), third and youngest son of the 2nd Earl
- Gerald FitzGerald, 5th Earl of Kildare (died 1432), a son of the 4th Earl
  - The 5th Earl had at least one son Thomas, who predeceased him
- John FitzGerald, 6th Earl of Kildare (de jure; d.c.1434), a younger son of the 4th Earl; he was forced to dispute his right to the title with a son-in-law of the 5th Earl
- Thomas FitzGerald, 7th Earl of Kildare (died 1478), son of the 6th Earl
- Gerald FitzGerald, 8th Earl of Kildare (c. 1456–1513), eldest son of the 7th Earl (Gearóid Mór FitzGerald)
- Gerald FitzGerald, 9th Earl of Kildare (1487–1534), eldest son of the 8th Earl (Gearóid Óg Fitzgerald)
- Thomas FitzGerald, 10th Earl of Kildare (died 1537), "Silken Thomas", eldest son of the 9th Earl, led an insurrection in Ireland and his honours were forfeit, and he died unmarried

Other titles (11th–13th Earls): Earl of Kildare and Baron of Offaly (1554)

- Gerald FitzGerald, 11th Earl of Kildare (1525–1585), second son of the 9th Earl, was given a new creation in 1554 then restored to his brother's honours in 1569
  - Gerald (Garrett) FitzGerald, Lord Offaly (1559–1580), eldest son of the 11th Earl, predeceased his father without male issue
- Henry FitzGerald, 12th Earl of Kildare (1562–1597), second son of the 11th Earl, died without male issue
- William FitzGerald, 13th Earl of Kildare (died 1599), third and youngest son of the 11th Earl, died unmarried
- Gerald FitzGerald, 14th Earl of Kildare (died 1612), elder son of Edward, himself third and youngest son of the 9th Earl
- Gerald FitzGerald, 15th Earl of Kildare (1611–1620), only son of the 14th Earl, died in childhood
- George FitzGerald, 16th Earl of Kildare (1612–1660), also 2nd Baron Offaly from 1658, a son of Thomas, himself younger brother of the 14th Earl, and the 1st Baroness Offaly
- Wentworth FitzGerald, 17th Earl of Kildare (1634–1664), elder son of the 16th Earl
- John FitzGerald, 18th Earl of Kildare (1661–1707), only son of the 17th Earl, died without surviving issue
  - Henry FitzGerald, Lord Offaly (1683–1684), only son of the 18th Earl, died in infancy
- Robert FitzGerald, 19th Earl of Kildare (1675–1744), only son of Robert, himself younger son of the 16th Earl

Other titles (20th Earl): Viscount Leinster, of Taplow in the County of Buckingham (GB 1747)

- James FitzGerald, 20th Earl of Kildare (1722–1773) was created Marquess of Kildare in 1761

=== Marquesses of Kildare (1761) ===
Other titles: Earl of Kildare (1316), Earl of Offaly (1761), Viscount Leinster, of Taplow in the County of Buckingham (GB 1747) and Baron of Offaly (c. 1193)

- James FitzGerald, 1st Marquess of Kildare (1722–1773) was created Duke of Leinster in 1766
  - George FitzGerald, Earl of Offaly (1748–1765), eldest son of the 1st Marquess

=== Dukes of Leinster, second creation (1766) ===
Other titles: Marquesse of Kildare (1761), Earl of Kildare (1316), Earl of Offaly (1761), Viscount Leinster, of Taplow in the County of Buckingham (GB 1747), Baron Offaly (1620) and Baron of Offaly (c. 1193)

- James FitzGerald, 1st Duke of Leinster (1722–1773), elder son of the 19th Earl
- William Robert FitzGerald, 2nd Duke of Leinster (1749–1804), second son of the 1st Duke
  - George FitzGerald, Marquess of Kildare (1783–1784), eldest son of the 2nd Duke, died in infancy
- Augustus Frederick FitzGerald, 3rd Duke of Leinster (1791–1874), second son of the 2nd Duke

Other titles (4th Duke onwards): Baron Kildare, of Kildare in the County of Kildare (UK 1870)

- Charles William FitzGerald, 4th Duke of Leinster (1819–1887), eldest son of the 3rd Duke
- Gerald FitzGerald, 5th Duke of Leinster (1851–1893), eldest son of the 4th Duke
- Maurice FitzGerald, 6th Duke of Leinster (1887–1922), eldest son of the 5th Duke, died unmarried
- Edward FitzGerald, 7th Duke of Leinster (1892–1976), third and youngest son of the 5th Duke
- Gerald FitzGerald, 8th Duke of Leinster (1914–2004), only legitimate son of the 7th Duke
- Maurice FitzGerald, 9th Duke of Leinster (born 1948), elder son of the 8th Duke

=== Present duke ===
Maurice FitzGerald, 9th Duke and Marquess of Leinster (born 7 April 1948) is the elder son of the 8th Duke and of his second wife, Anne, and was previously styled as Earl of Offaly.

A landscape gardener by profession, he was educated at Millfield and succeeded to his father's peerages on his death in 2004. On 19 February 1972, as Earl of Offaly, he married Fiona Mary Francesca Hollick. They had three children:

- Thomas FitzGerald, Earl of Offaly (1974–1997); killed in a motor accident;
- Lady Francesca Emily Purcell FitzGerald-Hobbs (born 1976);
- Lady Pollyanna Louisa Clementine FitzGerald (born 1982).

In 2004, he succeeded as Duke of Leinster, Marquess and Earl of Kildare, Earl of Offaly, Viscount Leinster of Taplow, Baron Offaly, Baron Kildare, and as the Premier Duke, Marquess, and Earl in the Peerage of Ireland. The family seat is now Oakley Park, near Abingdon, Oxfordshire.

As Leinster's only son died childless in 1997, his brother, Lord John FitzGerald (1952–2015), became the heir presumptive to the peerages, but died in 2015. Lord John FitzGerald had two children:

- Hermione FitzGerald (born 1985);
- Edward FitzGerald (born 1988), heir presumptive to the dukedom and other peerages.

== Line of succession ==
Line of succession
- Charles FitzGerald, 4th Duke of Leinster (1819–1897)
  - Gerald FitzGerald, 5th Duke of Leinster (1851–1893)
    - Maurice FitzGerald, 6th Duke of Leinster (1887–1922)
    - Edward FitzGerald, 7th Duke of Leinster (1892–1976)
      - Gerald FitzGerald, 8th Duke of Leinster (1914–2004)
        - Maurice FitzGerald, 9th Duke of Leinster (born 1948)
        - Lord John FitzGerald (1952–2015)
          - (1) Edward FitzGerald (b. 1988)
            - (2) Hector John FitzGerald (b. 2025)
  - Lord Charles FitzGerald (1859–1928)
    - Rupert Augustus FitzGerald (1900–1969)
      - Peter Charles FitzGerald (1925–1999)
        - (3) Stephen Peter FitzGerald (b. 1953)

== Family tree ==
FitzGerald family tree: Earls of Kildare, Dukes of Leinster and Schomberg, Marquesses of Kildare and Barons Rayleigh

Gerald de Windsor	Nest ferch Rhys
Maurice FitzGerald c. 1105–1176; Lord of Lanstephan
Baron Offaly, 1175
Gerald FitzMaurice c. 1150–1204; 1st Lord of Offaly	Thomas FitzMaurice c. 1175–1213; Lord of O'Connelloe
Maurice FitzGerald; 1194–1257; 2nd Lord of Offaly	Earl of Desmond
Maurice FitzGerald; 3rd Lord of Offaly; 1238–c. 1286	Thomas FitzGerald d. 1271
Earl of Kildare, 1316
John FitzGerald; 1250–1316; 1st Earl of Kildare, 4th Lord of Offaly
Thomas FitzGerald d. 1328; 2nd Earl of Kildare
Richard FitzGerald; 1317–1329; 3rd Earl of Kildare	Maurice FitzGerald; 1318–1390; 4th Earl of Kildare
Gerald FitzGerald d. 1432; 5th Earl of Kildare	John FitzGerald d. 1434; 6th Earl of Kildare
Thomas FitzGerald c. 1421–1478; 7th Earl of Kildare
Gerald FitzGerald c. 1456–1513; 8th Earl of Kildare
Gerald FitzGerald; 1487–1534; 9th Earl of Kildare
Earl of Kildare (2nd creation), 1554; Ancient earldom restored, 1569
Thomas FitzGerald; 1513–1537; 10th Earl of Kildare	Gerald FitzGerald; 1525–1585; 1st & 11th Earl of Kildare	Edward FitzGerald; 1528–1590
Kildare earldom (1st creation) forfeit, 1537
King James VI & I 1566–1625	Henry FitzGerald; 1562–1597; 2nd & 12th Earl of Kildare	William FitzGerald c. 1563–1599; 3rd & 13th Earl of Kildare	Gerald FitzGerald d. 1612; 14th Earl of Kildare	Thomas FitzGerald c. 1560–1619
Elizabeth Stuart; 1596–1662	King Charles I 1600–1649	Gerald FitzGerald; 1611–1620; 15th Earl of Kildare	George FitzGerald; 1612–1660; 16th Earl of Kildare
Duke of Schomberg, Marquess of Harwich, Earl of Brentford and Baron Teyes, 1689
Charles Louis; 1617–1680; Elector Palatine	Frederick Schomberg; 1615–1690; 1st Duke of Schomberg, etc., Count of Mértola (Portugal)	King Charles II; 1630–1685	Wentworth FitzGerald; 1634–1664; 17th Earl of Kildare	Robert FitzGerald; 1638–1698
Duke of Leinster (1st creation), Earl of Bangor, Baron Tara, of Bellinter in the County of Meath, 1691
Raugravine Caroline Elisabeth; 1659–1696	Meinhardt Schomberg; 1641–1719; 3rd Duke of Schomberg, etc., Duke of Leinster, etc., Count of Mértola (Portugal)	Charles Schomberg; 1645–1693; 2nd Duke of Schomberg, etc., Count of Mértola (Portugal)	Charles Lennox; 1672–1723; Duke of Richmond	John FitzGerald; 1661–1707; 18th Earl of Kildare	Robert FitzGerald; 1675–1744; 19th Earl of Kildare
Dukedom of Leinster (1st creation) and Dukedom of Schomberg extinct, 1719
Charles Lennox; 1701–1750; Duke of Richmond
Viscount Leinster, of Taplow in the County of Buckingham, 1747; Marquess of Kildare and Earl of Offaly, 1761; Duke of Leinster (2nd creation), 1766
Emily Lennox; 1731–1814	James FitzGerald; 1722–1773; 1st Duke of Leinster, etc., 20th Earl of Kildare
Baron Lecale	Baron Rayleigh
George FitzGerald; 1748–1765 styled Earl of Offaly	William Robert FitzGerald; 1749–1804; 2nd Duke of Leinster, etc., 21st Earl of Kildare	Charles James FitzGerald; 1756–1810; Baron Lecale	Charlotte Strutt; 1758–1836; 1st Baroness Rayleigh
Lecale barony extinct, 1810
George FitzGerald; 1783–1784 styled Marquess of Kildare	Augustus Frederick FitzGerald; 1791–1874; 3rd Duke of Leinster, etc., 22nd Earl of Kildare	John James Strutt; 1796–1873; 2nd Baron Rayleigh
Baron Kildare, 1870
Charles William FitzGerald; 1819–1887; 4th Duke of Leinster, etc., 23rd Earl of Kildare, 1st Baron Kildare
Gerald FitzGerald; 1851–1893; 5th Duke of Leinster, etc., 24th Earl of Kildare, 2nd Baron Kildare	John William Strutt; 1842–1919; 3rd Baron Rayleigh
Maurice FitzGerald; 1887–1922; 6th Duke of Leinster, etc., 25th Earl of Kildare, 3rd Baron Kildare	Desmond FitzGerald; 1888–1916	Edward FitzGerald; 1892–1976; 7th Duke of Leinster, etc., 26th Earl of Kildare, 4th Baron Kildare	Robert John Strutt; 1875–1947; 4th Baron Rayleigh
Gerald FitzGerald; 1914–2004; 8th Duke of Leinster, etc., 27th Earl of Kildare, 5th Baron Kildare	John Arthur Strutt; 1908–1988; 5th Baron Rayleigh
Maurice FitzGerald b. 1948; 9th Duke of Leinster, etc., 28th Earl of Kildare, 6th Baron Kildare	John FitzGerald; 1952–2015	John Gerald Strutt b. 1960; 6th Baron Rayleigh
Thomas FitzGerald; 1974–1997 styled Earl of Offaly	Edward FitzGerald b. 1988	John Frederick Strutt b. 1993
Heir presumptive to the Leinster dukedom	Heir apparent to the Barony Rayleigh

== Coat of arms ==
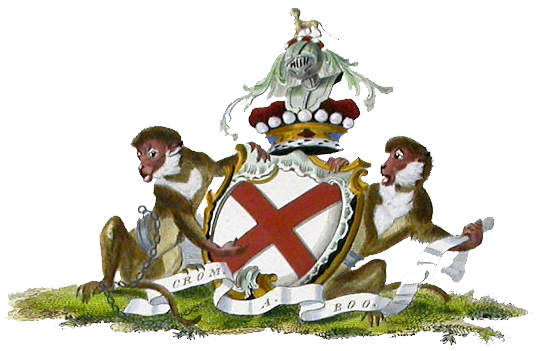
Arms of the Duke of Leinster

The coat of arms of the Dukes of Leinster derives from the legend that John FitzGerald, 1st Earl of Kildare, as a baby in Woodstock Castle, was trapped in a fire when a pet monkey rescued him. The FitzGeralds then adopted a monkey as their crest (and later supporters) and occasionally use the additional motto Non immemor beneficii (Not forgetful of a helping hand). The motto "Crom A Boo" comes from the medieval Croom Castle and "Abu", meaning "up" in Irish; Crom Abu was the FitzGeralds' medieval warcry. Crom (Croom) and Shanet (Shanid) were two castles about 16 miles apart in County Limerick, one being the seat of the Geraldines of Kildare, and the other that of the Geraldines of Desmond, whose distinctive war cries were accordingly "Crom-a-boo" and "Shanet-a-boo". In 1495 an act of Parliament was passed (10 Hen. 7. c. 20 (Ir)) "to abolish the words Crom-a-boo and Butler-a-boo." The word "Abu" or "Aboo", an exclamation of defiance, was the usual termination of the war cries in Ireland, as in a' buaidh, "to victory!" Saint Patrick's Saltire, a red saltire on a white field, may have been adapted from the duke's arms on the 1783 creation of the Order of Saint Patrick, of which the 2nd Duke of Leinster was the senior founder knight.

- Escutcheon: Argent a saltire gules.
- Crest: A monkey statant proper environed about the middle with a plain collar and chained or.
- Supporters: Two monkeys, environed and chained as in the crest.
- Motto: Crom a boo (Now it would be spelt "Crom Abu"). In English, "Up Croom", or "Croom to victory".

== See also ==
- Irish nobility
- Baron Offaly
- Baron Lecale
- Baron Rayleigh
- Baron de Ros
- Earl of Desmond
