= Gerard Fitzgerald =

Gerard Fitzgerald may refer to:

- Gerard FitzGerald, Australian rules footballer
- Gerard George Fitzgerald, member of parliament in New Zealand

== See also ==
- Gerald Fitzgerald (disambiguation)
