= Garret FitzGerald (disambiguation) =

Garret FitzGerald (1926–2011) was the 8th Taoiseach of Ireland.

Garret FitzGerald may also refer to:

- Garret FitzGerald (18th-century MP) (died 1775)
- Garret A. FitzGerald (born 1950), Irish pharmacologist
- Garrett Fitzgerald (rugby union) (1955/56–2020), Irish rugby union player

== See also ==
- Gerald Fitzgerald (disambiguation), alternative anglicisation of the same Irish name
- FitzGerald dynasty
