= John Preston, 1st Baron Tara =

Irish politician

John Preston, 1st Baron Tara (4 November 1764 – 18 July 1821), was an Irish politician.

Preston was the son of John Preston, a descendant of a younger brother of Thomas Preston, 1st Viscount Tara, second son of Christopher Preston, 4th Viscount Gormanston. He inherited Bellinter House.

He was elected to the Irish House of Commons as one of two representatives for Navan in 1783 (aged only 18), a seat he held until the Irish Parliament was abolished in 1800. He was raised to the Peerage of Ireland the same year as Baron Tara, of Bellinter in the County of Meath, a reward for his support for the Union.

Lord Tara was childless and the title became extinct on his death in July 1821, aged 56.

Parliament of Ireland
| Preceded by Joseph Preston; James Pratt | Member of Parliament for Navan; 1783–1800; With: Joseph Preston | Parliament of the United Kingdom |
Regnal titles
| New creation | Baron Tara; 1800–1821 | Extinct |
