= Custos Rotulorum of County Kildare =

The Custos Rotulorum of County Kildare was the highest civil officer in County Kildare, Ireland. The position was later combined with that of Lord Lieutenant of Kildare.

== Incumbents ==
- 1680–1685 Hon. Robert FitzGerald
- 1685–? Edward Brabazon, 4th Earl of Meath (died 1707)
- 1798–1804 William FitzGerald, 2nd Duke of Leinster
- 1804–1819 Lord Robert FitzGerald
- 1819–1874 Augustus Frederick FitzGerald, 3rd Duke of Leinster

For later custodes rotulorum, see Lord Lieutenant of Kildare
