= Baron Offaly =

Extinct baronies

- Creation date: 1554
- Created by: Mary I
- Peerage: Peerage of Ireland
- First holder: Gerald FitzGerald, 11th Earl of Kildare
- Present holder: Maurice FitzGerald, 9th Duke of Leinster
- Heir presumptive: Edward FitzGerald (nephew of the present holder)
- Remainder to: the 1st Duke's heirs male of the body lawfully begotten
- Subsidiary titles: Lord Offelan
- Former seats: Maynooth Castle; Kilkea Castle; Leinster House; Carton House

There have been two creations of the title Baron Offaly, both in the Peerage of Ireland.

Two earlier medieval creations as Baron of Offaly existed for an earlier FitzGerald, who owned land in County Kildare, Ireland, including what was then "Offelan", a word that derived from the Irish Uí Faelain and not from what is now County Offaly. The original grant of the lordship of Offelan was in 1175 to Maurice FitzGerald, one of Strongbow's main supporters.

In 1538–50 the title was recreated for Brian O'Connor Faly, who was based in neighbouring County Offaly.

The first modern creation by Queen Mary I was for Gerald FitzGerald on 13 May 1554, who was also created Earl of Kildare at the same time and later restored to the senior earldom of Kildare (forfeit by his half-brother, Thomas) in 1569. The title (as well as the second creation of the earldom), became extinct in 1599 when the 13th earl's branch of the family became extinct and the senior earldom passed to his cousin, Gerald.

The second creation of the title was for Lettice Digby on 29 July 1620. She was the daughter of Gerald FitzGerald, Lord Offally (1559–1580; the eldest son of the 11th earl, who predeceased his father) and the wife of Sir Robert Digby. Her eldest son, Robert, was created Baron Digby on the same day. The patent of the barony stipulated that it was not to pass to Lord Digby, but instead to the head of the House of Kildare, who, at the time of Baroness Offaly's death in 1658, was George FitzGerald, 16th Earl of Kildare. The 20th earl was later created Duke of Leinster in 1766 and the dukedom and barony remain united.

== FitzGerald Barons of Offaly ==
- Gerald FitzMaurice, 1st Lord of Offaly (c. 1152 – c. 1203)
- Maurice FitzGerald, 2nd Lord of Offaly (1190–1257)
- Maurice FitzGerald, 3rd Lord of Offaly (1238–1286)
- John FitzThomas FitzGerald, 4th Lord of Offaly (1287-1316).

for further Barons of Offaly, see Duke of Leinster

== O'Conor Faly Barons of Offaly ==
- Brian O'Connor Faly (1525–1556) (In Irish, Brian mac Cathaoir Ó Conchobhair Failghe) attainted in 1550

== Barons Offaly, first creation (1554–1599) ==
- Gerald FitzGerald, 11th Earl of Kildare, 1st Baron Offaly (1525–1585)
- Henry FitzGerald, 12th Earl of Kildare, 2nd Baron Offaly (1562–1597)
- William FitzGerald, 13th Earl of Kildare, 3rd Baron Offaly (died 1599)

== Barons Offaly, second creation (1620–present) ==
- Lettice Digby, 1st Baroness Offaly (c. 1578–1658)
- George FitzGerald, 16th Earl of Kildare, 2nd Baron Offaly (1612–1660)

for further Barons Offaly, see Duke of Leinster

== See also ==
- FitzGerald dynasty
