= Robert FitzGerald (1637–1698) =

Irish soldier, politician and official

Robert FitzGerald (1637 – 31 January 1698) was an Irish soldier, politician and official.

== Biography ==
FitzGerald was the third, but second surviving, son of George FitzGerald, 16th Earl of Kildare and Lady Joan Boyle, daughter of Richard Boyle, 1st Earl of Cork.

In 1659 he was commissioned with the rank of cornet and in 1664 he was promoted to lieutenant in the Royal Horse Guards. Between 1661 and 1666 he was a Member of Parliament for County Kildare in the Irish House of Commons. As Comptroller of the Musters and Cheques of the Army in the Dublin Castle administration, he was appointed to the Privy Council of Ireland in 1678 by Charles II of England. Between 1680 and 1685 he served as Custos Rotulorum of County Kildare. Following the Glorious Revolution, it appears that he adhered to James II of England and served in his Irish army as Comptroller of Musters. He was present at the Battle of the Boyne. Despite this, he seems to have escaped any repercussions and represented County Kildare in parliament again from 1692 to 1693.

On 4 August 1663, he married Mary Clotworthy. Their only son was Robert FitzGerald, 19th Earl of Kildare.

Parliament of Ireland
Preceded by Maurice Fitzgerald; Maurice Eustace	Member of Parliament for County Kildare; 1661–1666; With: Sir Paul Davys	Succeeded by John Wogan; George Aylmer
Preceded by John Wogan; George Aylmer	Member of Parliament for County Kildare; 1692–1693; With: George FitzGerald	Succeeded by George FitzGerald; Henry Colley
