= Baron Tara =

Baron Tara was a title that was created twice in the Peerage of Ireland. It was created for the first time in 1691 in favour of the soldier Lord Meinhardt Schomberg, younger son of Frederick Schomberg, 1st Duke of Schomberg. He was made Earl of Bangor and Duke of Leinster at the same time. For more information on this creation, see Duke of Schomberg.

It was created for a second in time in 1800 in favour of John Preston, who was made Baron Tara, of Bellinter in the County of Meath. He had previously represented Navan in the Irish House of Commons. Preston was a descendant of a younger brother of Thomas Preston, 1st Viscount Tara, who himself was the second son of Christopher Preston, 4th Viscount Gormanston. However, Lord Tara was childless and the title became extinct on his death in 1821.

== Barons Tara; First creation (1691) ==
Duke of Schomberg in the Peerage of England was created in 1689.

== Barons Tara; Second creation (1800) ==
- John Preston, 1st Baron Tara (1764–1821)

== See also ==
- Viscount Tara
- Viscount Gormanston
