= Hermione FitzGerald =

Irish golfer

Personal information
- Nationality: Ireland
- Born: 11 October 1985 (age 41) Newmarket, Suffolk, England

Career
- Sport: Golf
- Status: Professional
- Current tour: Jamega Ladies Tour
- Former tour: LET Access Series
- Professional wins: 3

Hermione FitzGerald (born 11 October 1985) is an Irish professional golfer.

== Early life ==
FitzGerald is the daughter of Lord John FitzGerald and wife Barbara Zindel. She is of Irish and Swiss descent. She began playing golf at the age of eight when she first tried playing it on the Emirates Golf Club course when she was on holiday in Dubai. She regularly played at the Dubai Creek and Nad Al Sheba golf courses in her youth. In 1992, her father was approached by Sheikh Mohammed Bin Rashid Al Maktoum to help promote the horse racing scene in Dubai. She then attended the Dubai English Speaking School from 1992 to 1996, graduating from the Hills Road Sixth Form College in French, Italian, history and physical education.

== Career ==
Although she was born in England, FitzGerald represents Ireland when playing golf professionally. FitzGerald played on the LET Access Series in 2014, making two cuts in the Open Generali de Strasbourg and the WPGA International Challenge, finishing T-46 in both events. In 2013, FitzGerald won three Jamega Ladies Tour events which were all based in the UK. Currently living in Woollhara since February 2017, she works in full time as the Australian and International Marketing Manager of OTI Sport and OTI Racing in Sydney, Australia, where she manages business development initiatives for OTI Racing and OTI Sport, promote OTI Racing's partnerships, built OTI Racing's and OTI Sport brand awareness, oversees OTI Racing NSW operations, including racehorse management, client liaison and race day communications, and organises and promotes events, and tours for OTI Sport clients.
