= Wentworth FitzGerald, 17th Earl of Kildare =

Irish politician

Wentworth FitzGerald, 17th Earl of Kildare PC (I) (1634 – 5 March 1664), styled Lord Offaly until 1660, was an Irish politician who sat in the House of Commons of England in 1660 and from 1661 sat in the Irish House of Lords.

== Background ==
Kildare was the son of George FitzGerald, 16th Earl of Kildare, and Lady Jane Boyle, daughter of Richard Boyle, 1st Earl of Cork. He succeeded his father in the earldom in 1660.

== Political career ==
Kildare served as Governor of King's County, County Kildare and Queen's County. He owned no property in Nottinghamshire, but in April 1660 he was elected Member of Parliament for East Retford in the Convention Parliament. In 1661, he took his seat in the Irish House of Lords and was sworn of the Irish Privy Council. He was active both in Parliament and in the Privy Council.

== Family ==
Kildare married Lady Elizabeth, daughter of John Holles, 2nd Earl of Clare and his wife Elizabeth Vere c. 1655. He died in March 1664 and was succeeded by his son, John. His daughter, Anne, married Hugh Boscawen of Tregothnan, Cornwall, was widowed, and remarried Francis Robartes. Both her husbands belonged to leading Cornish families.

Parliament of England
Preceded by Edward Neville	Member of Parliament for East Retford; 1660–1661; With: Sir William Hickman, 2nd Baronet	Succeeded by Sir William Hickman, 2nd Baronet; Clifford Clifton
Peerage of Ireland
Preceded by George FitzGerald	Earl of Kildare; 1660–1664	Succeeded by John FitzGerald
