= Gerald FitzGerald, 8th Duke of Leinster =

Irish peer (1914–2004)

His Grace The Duke of Leinster
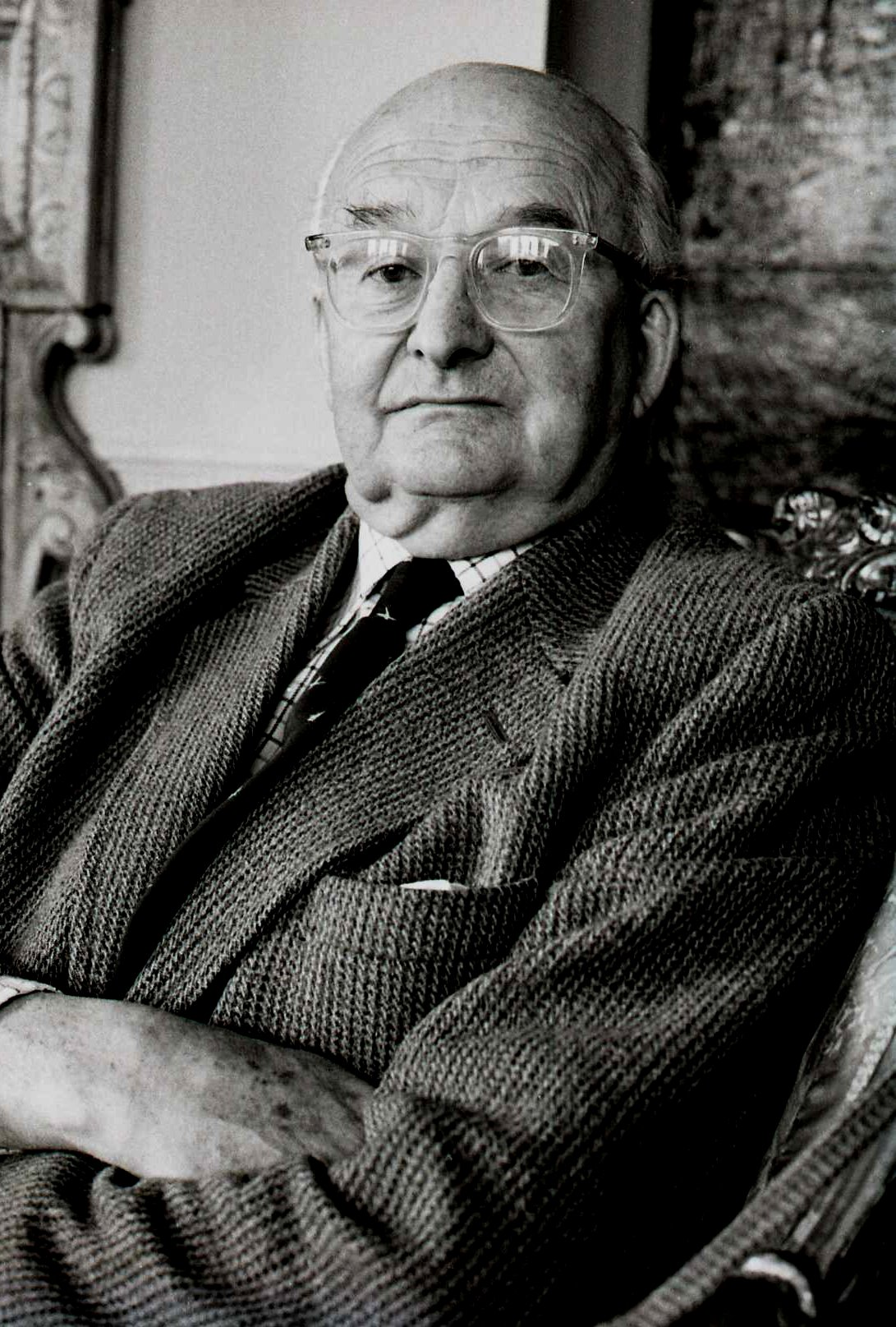
- Portrait by Allan Warren, 1990

Personal details
- Born: Gerald FitzGerald; 27 May 1914 London, England
- Died: 3 December 2004 (aged 90)
- Spouses: Joane Kavanagh (m. 1936; div. 1946) Anne Eustace-Smith (m. 1946)
- Children: 5, including John
- Parent: Edward FitzGerald, 7th Duke of Leinster (father)
- Education: RMC, Sandhurst

Military service
- Allegiance: United Kingdom
- Branch/service: British Army
- Unit: 5th Royal Inniskilling Dragoon Guards
- Battles/wars: World War II

Gerald FitzGerald, 8th Duke of Leinster (27 May 1914 – 3 December 2004) was an Anglo-Irish peer.

== Early life ==
Gerald FitzGerald was the only child of Edward FitzGerald, 7th Duke of Leinster, and his first wife May Juanita Etheridge, a chorus girl.

Relations between Gerald FitzGerald's parents became strained when he was still a small child. In 1922, his father succeeded as the 7th Duke of Leinster following the death of the 6th Duke, and Gerald acquired the courtesy title of Marquess of Kildare. But Harry Mallaby-Deeley acquired control of the large estates of the Dukes of Leinster during the lifetime of the new duke, who had previously sold Mallaby-Deeley his reversionary rights to them for a small sum, not expecting a younger son to inherit.

Soon after this, the seventh Duke secured a separation from his mother, and they were divorced eight years later, in 1930. Gerald was largely raised by his great-aunt Lady Adelaide FitzGerald (1860–1942), at Johnstown Castle, County Wexford. A daughter of George Forbes, 7th Earl of Granard, she was the widow of his great-uncle Lord Maurice FitzGerald, and it was felt that she would provide a suitable environment for the future duke.

The seventh Duke married four times in all, but had no other legitimate children and became notorious for financial profligacy and mismanagement. He had numerous step-children, the progeny of his wives by previous marriages. Among them was Joan Yarde-Buller, daughter of his third wife Denise Orme. Joan Yarde-Buller, also known as Princess Taj-ud-dawlah, was married to Prince Aly Khan at the time he married her mother in 1946. Joan's son Karim (born 1936) would in time become Prince Aga Khan IV.

Due to the seventh Duke’s money troubles, the trustees of the family estate entrusted the young Gerald Kildare with the care of family heirlooms and treasures and gave him an advance on his inheritance.

Educated at Eton College, Gerald Kildare became a cadet at the Royal Military College, Sandhurst and was commissioned into the 5th Royal Inniskilling Dragoon Guards. In 1935, his mother committed suicide by overdosing on sleeping pills. He saw active service in the Second World War and was discharged from the Army after being wounded in Normandy with the rank of major.

== Later life ==
After the war, the future duke farmed his estate at Kilkea Castle, County Kildare, Ireland, but it proved unprofitable. In the early 1960s, he moved to Oxfordshire and worked in the aviation industry. It was at his Oxfordshire home that, in 1976, the police were called to prevent his father making off with property worth over £100,000, a painting by Joshua Reynolds and a tapestry. The seventh Duke died the same year; however, the eighth Duke was delayed in receiving the peerages due to an American who claimed to be the son of his father's elder brother Lord Desmond FitzGerald (died 1916).

The Duke of Leinster was a keen field sportsman. He was Master of the North Kilkenny Foxhounds from 1937 to 1940; of the West Percy Foxhounds in 1945-1946; and of the Portman Foxhounds in 1946-1947.

In 1999, the Duke failed in his attempts to prevent a half-brother from being formally recognised as a member of the ducal family by both Debrett's Peerage and Burke's Peerage. This was Adrian FitzGerald, an illegitimate son of the 7th Duke by Yvonne Denison Percy Probyn, later surnamed FitzGerald by deed poll, who was the daughter of Captain Percy John Probyn, RAMC, the eldest son of Frederick Probyn, JP, of Cambridge House, Treverthen, Monmouthshire.

== Marriages and children ==
The Duke was twice married, his wives being:

- Joane Kavanagh (1915–1994), eldest daughter of Rt. Hon. Maj. Arthur Thomas MacMorrough Kavanagh, The MacMorrough Kavanagh, Prince of Leinster. Married on 17 October 1936, they divorced in 1946 (Joane, Marchioness of Kildare, married, the next year, Lt. Col. Archibald Macalpine-Downie, and had further issue.) The Kildares had three daughters, one of whom died in infancy:
  - Lady Pamela Hermione FitzGerald (6 November 1937 – 3 April 1938), whose middle name was given in honour of her father's paternal grandmother, Hermione, wife of the 5th Duke of Leinster.
  - Lady Rosemary Anne FitzGerald (born 4 August 1939), married on 9 February 1963 Mark Killigrew Wait. After her divorce in 1967, she returned to using her maiden name.
  - Lady Nesta FitzGerald (born 8 January 1942), married in 1977 Philip Tirard (died 1993), with whom she has two daughters.
- Anne Eustace-Smith (Whalton, 6 May 1922 – 4 December 2016), daughter of Lt. Col. Philip Eustace-Smith TD MC of Rothley Crag, Cambo, Morpeth, Northumberland (1888 – ?), High Sheriff of Northumberland in 1931, and wife (23 October 2012) Eleanor Anne Clayton (1887 – 1946); paternal granddaughter of Eustace Smith of the Manor House, Whalton (1861 – ?) and wife (Newcastle-upon-Tyne, 10 October 1886) Ellen Gertrude Hawkes (Chester, July or September 1865 – ?) and maternal granddaughter of John Bertram Clayton of Chesters, Northumberland, and of Charlwood Park, Surrey (9 October 1861 – 8 April 1900) and wife (26 January 1886) Florence Octavia Cadogan (London, 1862 – ?); great-granddaughter of Thomas Eustace Smith (3 June 1831 – 1903), shipping magnate, Member of Parliament between 1868 and 1885, son of shipbuilder William Smith and wife Margaret Werge) and wife (Haddington, 1 March 1855) Mary Martha Dalrymple (14 October 1835 – ?), daughter of William Henry Clarence Dalrymple and wife Margaret Werge), of Nathaniel George Clayton of Chesters, Northumberland, and of Charlwood Park, Surrey (20 September 1833 – 5 September 1895), son of Rev. Richard Clayton and wife ...) and wife (12 December 1860) Isabel Ogle (daughter of Rev. Edward Chaloner Ogle of Kirkley Hall and wife Sophia Ogle of the Ogle Baronets, of Worthy) and of Cadogan Hodgson-Cadogan of Brinkburn Priory (Dawlish, Devon, 1826 – 26 March 1886), Justice of Peace, High Sheriff of Northumberland in 1881, son of William Hodgson-Cadogan and wife ...) and wife (Brighton, 1848) Isabel Mary Smith (Langham Place, London - 1907, daughter of Oswald Smith of Blendon Hall and wife Henrietta Mildred Hodgson, both also parents of Frances Dora Smith, great-grandmother of Elizabeth II). They married in Alnwick on 12 June 1946 and had two sons:
  - Maurice FitzGerald, 9th Duke of Leinster (born 1948). Succeeded to the dukedom upon the death of his father. Married and had issue three children, but his only son died in a motor accident in 1997.
  - Lord John FitzGerald (3 March 1952 – 3 August 2015). His only son Edward FitzGerald is presently heir to the dukedom and other titles.

== Dual claims ==
After Gerald FitzGerald, Marquess of Kildare, became eighth Duke of Leinster, in 1976, a California artist and teacher, Leonard FitzGerald, claimed to be the rightful duke. He said his father was Lord Desmond FitzGerald, the second of three sons of Gerald FitzGerald, 5th Duke of Leinster, and who was thought to have been killed in the First World War while serving in the Irish Guards. Leonard FitzGerald declared that Lord Desmond, however, secretly emigrated to North America and lived there until his death in 1967, despite eyewitness accounts of Desmond FitzGerald's death and his burial at the public cemetery in Calais, France. (Note: Father Lane Fox, the late chaplain to the Irish Guards, lost his right eye and hand in a bombing accident. He was standing by the Colonel, Lord Desmond Fitzgerald, watching a bombing practice. The Colonel said 'Now, Padre, you have a try'. Lane Fox took a bomb, pulled out the pin, and then, before the proper time, the bomb exploded in his hand, destroying his right eye and hand, killing Lord Desmond Fitzgerald and wounding or killing two officers are several men.)

On the advice of his doctor, Leonard FitzGerald withdrew his claim because of poor health. He died in 1994, but the claim was continued by his son Paul FitzGerald, who filed a suit about this with the Department of Constitutional Affairs in 2006. Paul FitzGerald's claim, however, was eventually dismissed in 2007.

In 2010, however, DNA evidence was presented that indicates that Paul FitzGerald is related to the wife of the fifth Duke, the former Lady Hermione Duncombe. As reported in The Scotsman

With the help of Dunfermline-based genealogist Lloyd Pitcairn, Mrs. FitzGerald Caudill [Paul FitzGerald's aunt] traced Maud Crawford, the granddaughter of Lady Hermione's younger sister Ulrica Duncombe.

The results of the tests found that it was "41 times more probable" that Ms. Crawford and Paul FitzGerald were extremely closely related than that they were from different families. The proof that Paul FitzGerald is related to the titled family is the first DNA evidence ever produced in the case, and it strongly supports Mrs Fitz-Gerald Caudhill's long-held claim suggesting that her mysterious father was the son of Lady Hermione, the wife of the fifth Duke of Leinster.

Peerage of Ireland
| Preceded by Edward FitzGerald | Duke of Leinster; 1976–2004 | Succeeded by Maurice FitzGerald |
