= Charles Schomberg, 2nd Duke of Schomberg =

Charles Schomberg, 2nd Duke of Schomberg (5 August 1645 – 17 October 1693) was a general in the Prussian, Dutch and British Army, the second in the Von Schonberg line to be Duke of Schomberg, a title in the Peerage of England. He was born in 's-Hertogenbosch in the Generality Lands of the United Provinces, the son of Frederick, the first Duke.

Charles, like his father, made his early career in Brandenburg, attaining the rank of lieutenant-general in 1689. In 1688, he served with his father as a mercenary of the Dutch Republic in the Glorious Revolution which made William III of Orange king of England in 1689. In 1690 he succeeded as Duke when his father was killed at the Battle of the Boyne. From 1691 he served as "General of the troops of his British Majesty in Piedmont", during the Nine Years' War; commanding three regiments of exiled French Huguenots serving in the army of the Duke of Savoy: the regiments of Montauban, Miremont, and Montbrun. These troops were paid by the English government and led by Huguenot officers in English service.

In late 1692, while still serving as General of the British troops in Piedmont, he was also appointed colonel of the Regiment Saint-Julian, whose commander, the Sieur Saint-Julian, had returned to French service after converting to Catholicism. Thereafter, the regiment was known as Regiment Schomberg.

Charles died at the Battle of Marsaglia, Turin, in 1693. He was succeeded by his brother, Meinhardt Schomberg, 3rd Duke of Schomberg. He was succeeded as Colonel of his Regiment by another Huguenot in British service, Henri de Massue, 1st Viscount (later 1st Earl) of Galway. The regiment became known as Regiment Galway thereafter.

Military offices
Preceded by The Viscount Sidney	Colonel of the 1st Regiment of Foot Guards; 1690–1693	Succeeded by The Viscount Sidney
Peerage of England
Preceded by Frederick Schomberg	Duke of Schomberg; 1690–1693	Succeeded by Meinhardt Schomberg
