= Thomas FitzGerald, 2nd Earl of Kildare =

Thomas FitzJohn, 2nd Earl of Kildare, Lord Offaly (died 9 April 1328) was a noble in the Peerage of Ireland who held the office of Lord Justice of Ireland.

The eldest son of John FitzGerald, 1st Earl of Kildare, Lord Offaly, by his spouse Blanche Roche, daughter of John Roche, Lord Fermoy, the second earl was appointed commander of 30,000 men to fight Edward Bruce and the Scots. But with Roger, Lord Mortimer landing about the same time at Youghal the engagement was deferred until his force could also join them. Bruce was in the meantime defeated and killed in 1318, putting an end to the Scottish kingdom in Ireland.

In 1318 Thomas was appointed Lord Justice of Ireland (until 1321) and later reappointed in February 1326, holding the office until his death two years later at Maynooth. He was interred in the Franciscan Friary at Kildare.

He married at Greencastle, County Down on 16 August 1312, Joan (d. 23 April 1359), the third daughter of Richard de Burgh, 2nd Earl of Ulster, and had issue:

- John FitzGerald (1314–1323)
- Richard FitzGerald, 3rd Earl of Kildare (c. 1317 – 7 July 1329), died at Rathangan. He was buried on the right-hand side of his father.
- Maurice FitzGerald, 4th Earl of Kildare

== Notes ==
Peerage of Ireland
Preceded by John FitzGerald	Earl of Kildare; 1316–1328	Succeeded by Richard FitzGerald
