= George FitzGerald, 16th Earl of Kildare =

Irish landowner (1612–1660)

George FitzGerald, 16th Earl of Kildare (23 January 1612 – 29 May 1660) was known as the "Fairy Earl", apparently for no other reason than that his portrait, which is extant, was painted on a small scale."

== Biography ==
FitzGerald was the son of Thomas FitzGerald (died 1619) and Frances (1576–1618), daughter of Thomas Randolph, and great grandson of Gerald FitzGerald, 9th Earl of Kildare.

George Fitzgerald was in his ninth year when, in 1620, he inherited the Kildare peerage, on the death of Gerald FitzGerald, 15th Earl of Kildare, at the age of eight years and ten months. Earl George was given in wardship by the king to Ludovic Stewart, 2nd Duke of Lennox. On the decease of the latter, his widow transferred the wardship of the minor and his estates to Richard Boyle, 1st Earl of Cork, for £6,600.

Kildare studied for a time at Christ Church, Oxford, and in his eighteenth year married Joan, fourth daughter of Lord Cork. He appears to have been much under the influence of that astute adventurer; but occasional differences occurred between them, for the settlement of which the intervention of the lord deputy, Wentworth, was obtained.

A portrait of Kildare, painted in 1632, in which he is represented as of diminutive stature, is extant at Carton, the residence of the Duke of Leinster. There is also preserved at Carton a transcript, made in 1633 for Kildare, of an ancient volume known as the "Red Book of the Earls of Kildare". Kildare sat for the first time in the Irish House of Lords, in 1634, and was appointed colonel of a foot regiment in the English army in Ireland.

With pecuniary advances from Lord Cork Kildare rebuilt the decayed castle of his ancestors at Maynooth in the county of Kildare. James Shirley, the English dramatist, during his visit to Dublin in 1637–1638, was befriended by Kildare, and dedicated to him his tragi-comedy entitled 'The Royal Master,' acted at the castle and the theatre, Dublin, in 1638. Kildare was about that time committed to prison for having disobeyed an order made by the lord deputy for the delivery of documents connected with a suit at law with Lord Digby.

In 1641 Kildare was appointed governor of the county of Kildare, and subsequently took part with the leaders of the protestant party in Ireland in opposing the movements of the Irish Catholics to obtain from Charles I redress of their grievances. Correspondence between Kildare and the viceroy, Duke of Ormonde, in 1644 appears in the third and fourth volumes of the "History of the Irish Confederation and War."

In January 1646 Kildare and the Ulick Burke, 1st Marquess of Clanricarde became sureties to the extent of £10,000 each for the Edward Somerset, Earl of Glamorgan, on the occasion of his liberation from prison at Dublin.

Kildare acted as governor of Dublin under the Parliamentarian colonel, Michael Jones, in 1647, and in 1649 he received a pension of 46s. weekly from the government. In a subsequent petition to the chief justice of Munster Kildare stated that during eleven years he and his family had been driven to great extremities and endured much hardship in England and Ireland through his constant adherence and faithful affection to the parliament of England; that he was then, for debt, under restraint in London, and had despatched his wife and some of his servants to Ireland in hopes to raise a considerable sum out of his estate for his enlargement and subsistence.

Kildare died early in 1660. He was buried at Kildare. His second son, Wentworth, succeeded him as 17th Earl of Kildare.

== Family ==
Kildare married Lady Joan Boyle (1611–1656) on 15 August 1630. She was the daughter of Richard Boyle, 1st Earl of Cork and his second wife Catherine Fenton. George and Joan had three sons and six daughters. One of the sons (Robert, the eldest) and two of the daughters died young. One more of the daughters, Catherine, did not marry.

- Wentworth FitzGerald, 17th Earl of Kildare (1632 – 5 March 1664) married Lady Elizabeth Holles.
- Lady Eleanor Fitzgerald (Christened 18 May 1634 – 3 August 1681 married Sir Walter Borrowes, 2nd Baronet.
- Robert Fitzgerald (born 1638), married Mary Clotworthy and was the father of Robert FitzGerald, 19th Earl of Kildare.
- Lady Elizabeth Fitzgerald (1642 – died c. 1697/98) married Callaghan MacCarty, 3rd Earl of Clancarty, and subsequently Sir William Davys, Lord Chief Justice of Ireland.
- Frances married Sir James Shaen, 1st Baronet.

== Notes ==
Peerage of Ireland
Preceded by Gerald FitzGerald	Earl of Kildare; 1620 – 1660	Succeeded by Wentworth FitzGerald
Preceded by Lettice Digby	Baron Offaly; 1658 – 1660	Succeeded by Wentworth FitzGerald
