= John FitzGerald, 18th Earl of Kildare =

Irish peer

John Holles FitzGerald, 18th Earl of Kildare (1661 – 9 November 1707), styled Lord Offaly until 1664, was an Irish peer and Whig politician.

== Early life ==
Kildare was the only son of Wentworth FitzGerald, 17th Earl of Kildare and Lady Elizabeth, daughter of John Holles, 2nd Earl of Clare. He succeeded his father in the earldom in 1664. He was educated at Oxford University, and was made a Doctor of Civil Law by James, Duke of York upon his visit to the university in 1683. Kildare inherited vast Irish estates but he rarely visited the country, living primarily in Oxfordshire. In 1687 he entertained Mary of Modena at his estate at Caversham Park.

Despite these associations with James II, in 1689 he refused to attend James' 1689 Patriot Parliament in Dublin and consequently his Irish estates were seized by the Jacobites. He regained his property following the conclusion of the Williamite War in Ireland.

== Political career ==
Kildare was returned to the House of Commons of England for Tregony in 1694 on the interest of the Whig magnate, Hugh Boscawen. In the Commons, Kildare made no recorded speeches and did not appear on any parliamentary lists. In September 1695 he was summoned to attend the Irish House of Lords and did not stand at the 1695 English general election.

== Family ==
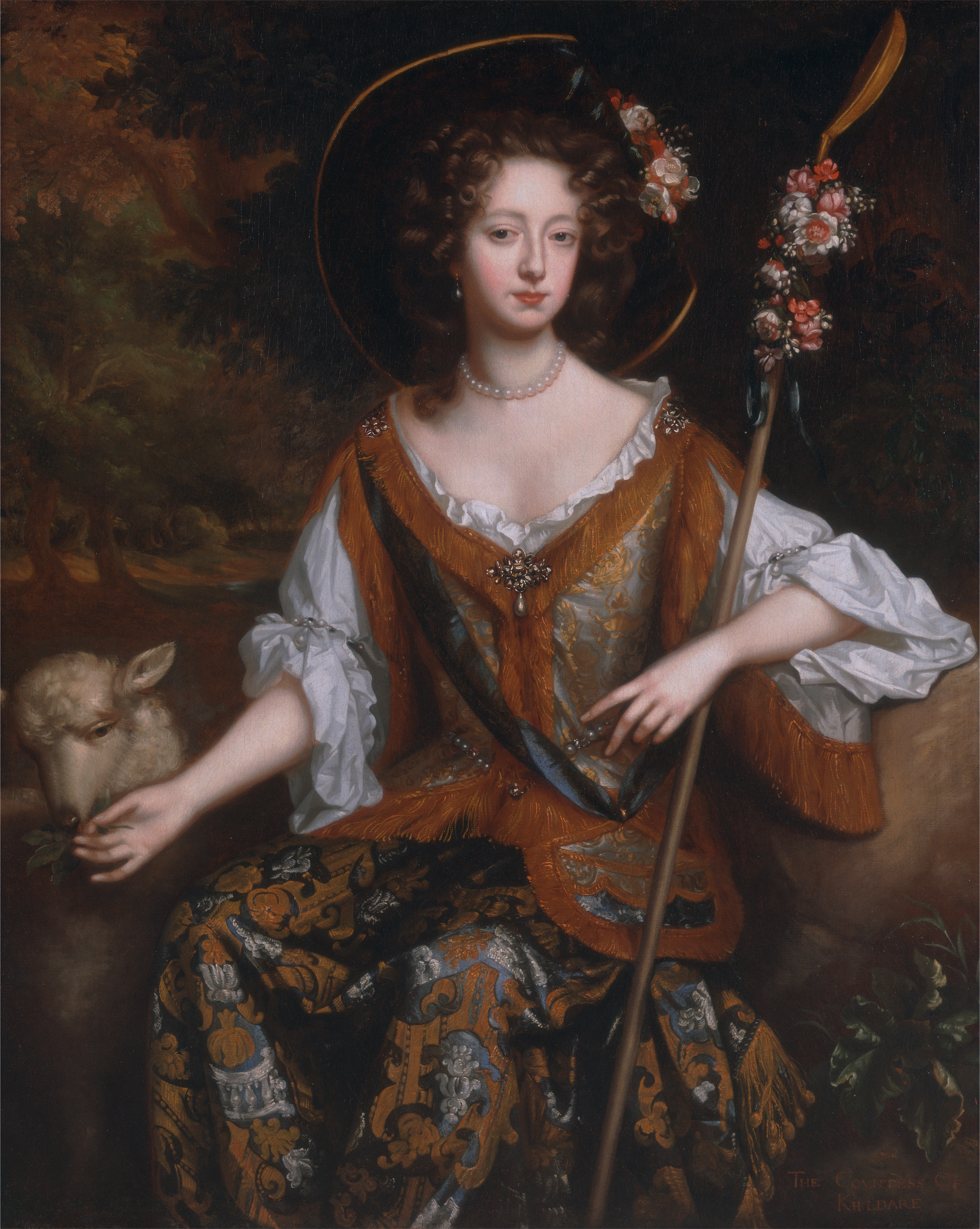
Elizabeth Jones, Countess of Kildare, as a shepherdess (Willem Wissing, ca. 1684)

Kildare married firstly, Mary, daughter of Henry O'Brien, Lord O'Brien. They had one child, Henry FitzGerald, Lord Offaly (1683–1684), who died as an infant. After Mary's death in November 1683, aged 21, Kildare married secondly, Lady Elizabeth, daughter of Richard Jones, 1st Earl of Ranelagh, on 12 June 1684. There were no children from this marriage.

Kildare died in November 1707 and was succeeded in the earldom by his first cousin, Robert FitzGerald, 19th Earl of Kildare. The Countess of Kildare died in April 1758.

Parliament of England
Preceded by Hugh Fortescue; Sir John Tremayne	Member of Parliament for Tregony; 1694–1695; With: Hugh Fortescue	Succeeded by Francis Robartes; James Montagu
Peerage of Ireland
Preceded by Wentworth FitzGerald	Earl of Kildare; 1664–1707	Succeeded by Robert FitzGerald
