= Maurice FitzGerald, 6th Duke of Leinster =

Irish nobleman

His Grace The Duke of Leinster

Personal details
- Born: Maurice FitzGerald; 1 March 1887
- Died: 2 April 1922 (aged 35)
- Parent(s): Gerald FitzGerald, 5th Duke of Leinster; Hermione Wilhelmina Duncombe

Maurice FitzGerald, 6th Duke of Leinster (1 March 1887 – 4 February 1922), styled Marquess of Kildare until 1893, was the eldest son of the 5th Duke of Leinster and his wife, the former Lady Hermione Wilhelmina Duncombe, a daughter of the 1st Earl of Feversham.

== Biography ==
Born at Kilkea Castle and never married but was educated at Eton College, he acceded to the dukedom and its related titles upon his father's death from typhoid fever in 1893, at age 42; his mother died of tuberculosis in 1895, at age 30.

The Duke had three siblings:

- A sister (born 1885 – died 5 February 1886)
- Lord Desmond FitzGerald (1888–1916)
- Edward FitzGerald, 7th Duke of Leinster (1892–1976), whose biological father it has been alleged was the 11th Earl of Wemyss.

During his minority, his family's large estates in County Kildare were sold in November 1903 by his trustees to 506 tenant farmers via the Land Commission. Some of the lands had a title dating back to the Norman invasion of Ireland in 1171. The 45,000 acres sold for £766,000, a huge amount at the time, but this had to cover costs, some mortgages and £272,000 that was earmarked to family trusts for the surviving younger children of the 4th duke.

== Mental illness and death ==
The 6th Duke was reported to be in delicate health from childhood onwards and, the day before he turned 21, in 1908, a newspaper observed that he was "little known in London", due to the "careful way in which he has been obliged to live". Actually, the young Duke was, at the time, a patient at Craig House Hospital, a psychiatric institution, in Edinburgh, Midlothian, Scotland; there he lived in his own villa, attended by a butler, from 1907 until his death in 1922.

From 1908 until death John Donald Pollock served as his personal physician and confidant.

== Ancestry ==
Maurice FitzGerald : 6th Duke of Leinster : Premier Duke, Marquess, and Earl of Ireland

16. William Robert FitzGerald; 2nd Duke of Leinster KP (1749–1804)
8. Augustus Frederick FitzGerald; 3rd Duke of Leinster (1791–1874)
17. Emilia Olivia St George; (da. Usher St. George) (b.17??)
4. Charles William FitzGerald; 4th Duke of Leinster (1847–1887)
18. Charles Stanhope; 3rd Earl of Harrington (1853–1859)
9. Charlotte Augusta Stanhope; (1793–1859)
19. Jane Fleming; (da. John Fleming) (b.17??)
2. Gerald FitzGerald; 5th Duke of Leinster (1851–1893)
20. George Granville Leverson-Gower; 1st Duke of Sutherland KG (1758–1833)
10. George Granville Sutherland-Leverson-Gower; 2nd Duke of Sutherland KG (1786–1861)
21. Elizabeth Countess of Sutherland; (1765–1839)
5. Caroline Sutherland-Leverson-Gower; (da. 2nd Duke of Sutherland) (1817–1887)
22. George Howard; 6th Earl of Carlisle KG (1773–1848)
11. Harriet Elizabeth Georgina Howard; (1806–1868)
23. Georgina Cavendish; (da. 5th Duke of Devonshire KG) (b.17??)
1. Maurice FitzGerald; 6th Duke of Leinster (b. 1887)
24. Charles Dunscombe; 1st Baron Feversham (1764–1841)
12. William Dunscombe; 2nd Baron Faversham (1798–1867)
25. Charlotte Legge; (da. 2nd Earl of Dartmouth) (d.1848)
6. William Ernest Dunscombe; 1st Earl of Feversham (b. 1829)
26. George Stewart; 8th Earl of Galloway KT (1768–1834)
13. Louisa Stewart; (d.1889)
27. Jane Paget; (da. 1st Earl Uxbridge) (d. 1842)
3. Hermione Wilhelmina Duncombe; (1864–1895)
28. Sir James Graham, 1st Baronet; (1761–1824)
14. Sir James Robert George Graham, 2nd Baronet PC; (1792–1861)
29. Catherine Stewart; (da. 7th Earl of Galloway (d.1836)
7. Mabel Violet Graham; (18??)
30. James Callander; (b.1774)
15. Fanny Callender; (d.1857)
31. Elizabeth MacDonnel; (da. 5th Earl of Antrim) (d.1796)

Peerage of Ireland
Preceded by Gerald FitzGerald	Duke of Leinster; 1893–1922	Succeeded by Edward FitzGerald
