= Edward FitzGerald, 7th Duke of Leinster =

Irish noble (1892–1976)

His Grace The Duke of Leinster

Personal details
- Born: Edward FitzGerald; 6 May 1892
- Died: 8 March 1976 (aged 83)
- Spouses: May Juanita Etheridge (m. 1913; div. 1930) Raffaelle Van Neck (m. 1932; div. 1946) Jessie Wessel (m. 1946; div. 1949) Vivien Irene Conner (m. 1965)
- Children: Gerald FitzGerald, 8th Duke of Leinster
- Parent(s): Gerald FitzGerald, 5th Duke of Leinster; Hermione Wilhelmina Duncombe

Edward FitzGerald, 7th Duke of Leinster, etc. (6 May 1892 – 8 March 1976), known as Lord Edward FitzGerald before 1922, was an Anglo-Irish peer. He was Duke of Leinster from 1922 until his death.

== Biography ==
Leinster was the youngest of the three sons born to Gerald, 5th Duke of Leinster, and his wife, the former Lady Hermione Duncombe. His mother died aged 30 in 1895. The child was thought to be the biological son of Hugo Charteris, 11th Earl of Wemyss.

For a short period, Leinster was a second lieutenant (on probation) in the Irish Guards, British Army, but resigned his commission on 4 December 1912. He served in the army during the First World War. In January 1915, he was made a temporary lieutenant in the 8th Battalion, Duke of Wellington's Regiment (West Riding). He took part in the Gallipoli campaign.

He inherited the Dukedom in February 1922, upon the death of his eldest brother, Maurice FitzGerald, 6th Duke of Leinster, who never married and was confined to a mental institution at the time of his death.

An addicted gambler, Leinster enjoyed an extravagant lifestyle, including motor racing. He had already signed away his possible reversionary rights to the family's ancestral seat, Carton House, near Maynooth in County Kildare, not expecting that he would inherit the property and the title. He chose to live in England and his estates remained in the possession of the beneficiary, Sir Harry Mallaby-Deeley, 1st Baronet, during the Duke's lifetime.

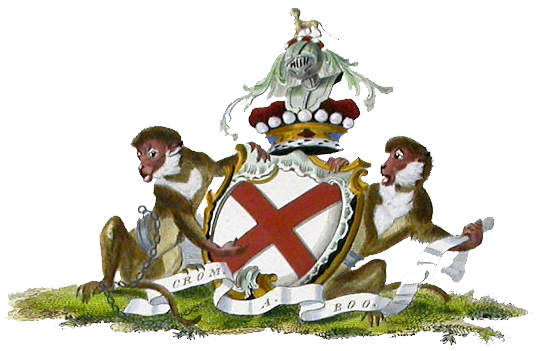
Arms of the Duke of Leinster

In 1936, Leinster testified at a bankruptcy hearing that he had travelled to the United States in 1928 in order to find an heiress to marry and that during his trip he "entertained lavishly on borrowed money in efforts to find an American wife who would pay off his debts". Two heiresses appeared to be interested but both eventually declined to become Duchess of Leinster.

Unable to repay his debts, the duke spent the final years of his life living in a small bedsit in Pimlico. He died by suicide in 1976 by taking an overdose of pentobarbital.

== Marriages and issue ==
The Duke of Leinster married four times.

The first wife was May Juanita Etheridge (4 August 1892 – 11 February 1935), a chorus girl and actress on the London Stage nicknamed the "Pink Pajama Girl", whom he married, in London, on 12 June 1913. She was the daughter of Jesse Edward Etheridge, a salesman, buried at Bishop's Cleeve, Gloucestershire, and son of a George Etheridge and wife ..., and his wife, the former Theresa Grace Harriett Ann Summerell. They separated in 1922, whereupon the duke paid his estranged wife approximately $50 a week, "on condition that she live in retirement and make no effort to communicate with her son". The duke sued the duchess for divorce in 1926, citing a George Frederick Newell as co-respondent. The couple finally divorced in 1930, with Stanley Williams, "a young chef", being named as co-respondent. After the end of her marriage, the duchess took the name May Murray by deed poll. In 1935 she committed suicide by an overdose of sleeping draught. They had one son:

- Gerald FitzGerald, 8th Duke of Leinster (27 May 1914 – 3 December 2004).

The second wife was (Agnes) Raffaelle Van Neck (14 December 1902 – 28 December 1993, London), an American socialite, who was the former wife of Clare Van Neck and the only child of Robert Davidson Kennedy and his first wife, the former May Nutting. The Duke and Mrs Van Neck married in London on 1 December 1932; they divorced in 1946, after some years of living in Scotland, the duke saying, "She said she could not live with black-faced sheep and lochs, and I saw a certain amount of truth in that".

The third wife was Jessie Wessel, a former actress and music-hall performer, known professionally as Denise Orme (1884–1960). She was the maternal grandmother of Prince Aga Khan IV. Born Jessie Smither, daughter of a bartender named Alfred Smither, she had become a music-hall performer and then married and divorced firstly Danish diplomat Theodor William Wessel, and secondly The 3rd Baron Churston; Leinster became her third husband on 11 March 1946. By this marriage, the duke acquired seven stepchildren, including Joan Yarde-Buller, known at that time (1936–49) as Princess Taj-ud-dawlah, mother of Prince Aga Khan IV (born 1936).

The fourth wife was Vivien Irene Conner, a waitress (19 February 1920 – Brighton, Sussex, 1992), the former wife of George William Conner and a daughter of Thomas Felton. She and the duke married in 1965.

Peerage of Ireland
Preceded by Maurice FitzGerald	Duke of Leinster; 1922–1976	Succeeded by Gerald FitzGerald
