= Robert FitzGerald, 19th Earl of Kildare =

Irish peer

Robert FitzGerald, 19th Earl of Kildare PC (Ire) (4 May 1675 – 20 February 1743), known as Robert FitzGerald until 1707, was an Irish peer.

== Background ==
Kildare was the son of the Hon. Robert FitzGerald, younger son of George FitzGerald, 16th Earl of Kildare. His mother was Mary, daughter of James Clotworthy of Monninmore, County Londonderry.

== Career ==
Kildare succeeded his first cousin as Earl of Kildare in 1707 and was sworn into the Irish Privy Council in 1710. In 1714 he served as Lord Justice of Ireland.

He was rather unusual among the Irish nobility of his time for his strong and sincere religious beliefs. Richard Parsons, 1st Earl of Rosse, a notorious rakehell, just before his death in 1741, received a letter from his local vicar reproaching him for his debauchery and blasphemy and urging him to repent. Rosse, noting that the letter was addressed only to "My Lord", as a dying joke put it in a fresh envelope and forwarded it to Kildare, who naturally assumed that it was an attack on him and was predictably furious. He demanded an inquiry by John Hoadly, Archbishop of Dublin, but the hoax was quickly exposed.

== Family ==
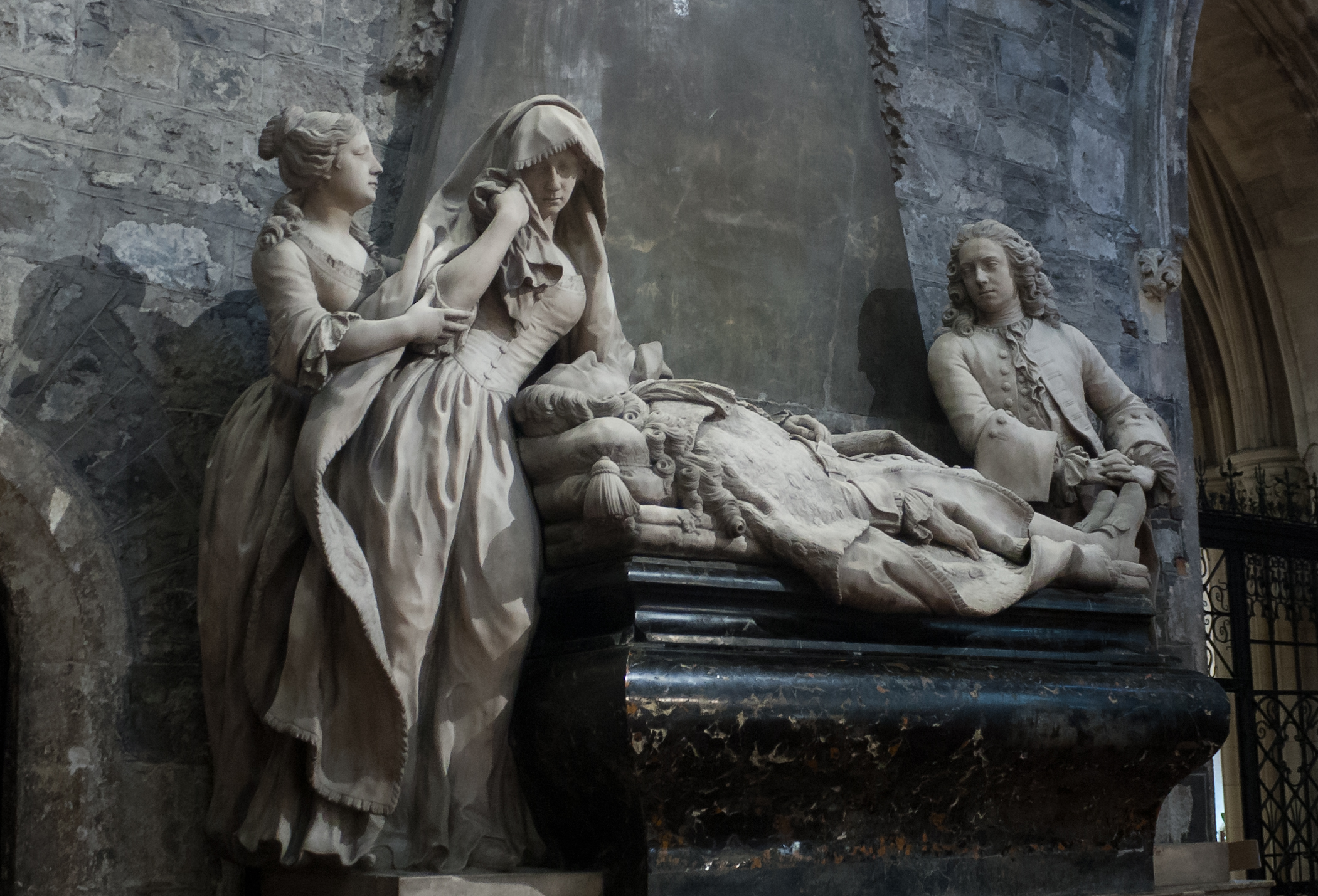
Monument dedicated to Robert FitzGerald, showing how he was mourned by his family, in Christ Church Cathedral.

Lord Kildare married Lady Mary, daughter of William O'Brien, 3rd Earl of Inchiquin and Mary Villiers on 7 March 1708. They had four sons and eight daughters, including:

- James FitzGerald, 1st Duke of Leinster (1722-1773)
- Hon. Richard FitzGerald
- Margaretta Hill, Countess of Hillsborough (died 19 January 1766), wife of Wills Hill, 1st Marquess of Downshire

Lord Kildare died in February 1743, aged 68, and was succeeded in the earldom by his son James, who was created Marquess of Kildare in 1761 and Duke of Leinster in 1766. A monument dedicated to him was created by Henry Cheere, showing how he was mourned by his wife and his surviving children Margaretta and James. This monument was first put at the north side of the choir of Christ Church Cathedral but later moved into the south transept.

Peerage of Ireland
Preceded by John FitzGerald	Earl of Kildare; 1707–1743	Succeeded by James FitzGerald
