= Maurice FitzGerald, 4th Earl of Kildare =

Irish nobleman (1318-1390)

Maurice FitzThomas FitzGerald, 4th Earl of Kildare (1318 - 25 August 1390) was a prominent Irish nobleman in the Peerage of Ireland who held the office of Lord Justice of Ireland.

The second son of Thomas FitzGerald, 2nd Earl of Kildare by his spouse Joan (d.1359), daughter of Richard de Burgh, 2nd Earl of Ulster, he succeeded his brother Richard, 3rd Earl, who died aged 12 in 1329.

Maurice, Earl of Kildare, suppressed the insurrection in 1339 of the O'Dempsies in Leinster; and in November 1346, with Lord Justice Bermingham, forced the O'Mores to submit and give hostages for their future good behaviour. In 1346 he was himself imprisoned due to suspicion about his loyalty to the Crown, but was soon released and restored to favour. On 26 January 1347 he was summoned by Writ signed at Eltham Palace to serve King Edward III at the siege of Calais where he proceeded in May with thirty men-at-arms and was subsequently made leader of the army, and knighted.

With various irregulars and foot-soldiers assigned to defend County Kildare against rebel Irish, the earl was appointed, on 14 September 1358, supervisor of the four commissioners for raising and collecting their pay from that county.

On 30 March 1360 he was constituted Lord Justice of Ireland with an annual salary of £500 sterling. He was made Custos of the realm again on 22 March 1371, and a third time on 16 February 1375, until the return of Sir William Windsor.

In 1364 he headed a delegation of Irish nobles and officials to complain directly to King Edward III about the misgovernment of Ireland, and the corruption of certain officials, notably Thomas de Burley, the Lord Chancellor of Ireland.

In 1378 he petitioned King Richard II that he had, at his request, accompanied the Lord Justice, James Butler, 2nd Earl of Ormond "in a certain amount of great hosting" of the O'Morchoes of Slewmargy (Sliabh Mairge), with numerous horsemen in his retinue, whereof six of his men were lost as well as four coats of mail and other armour. He asked for recompense, of which the King granted £10 sterling from the Exchequer of Ireland on 21 May 1378.

On 22 January 1377 he was summoned to the Parliament held at Castledermot; and on 11 September 1381 to that held at Trim; and on 29 April 1382 to that held at Dublin. In 1379 he was sent to England a second time to report on the state of Irish affairs, accompanied by the soldier and statesman Sir John Cruys of Thorncastle.

He was, with Sir Philip Courtenay, the Lord Justice, active in imposing law and order in Leinster and Merthyr and elsewhere, and in resisting rebels all at his own expense. His reward came partly in the form of a grant, dated 20 April 1386, of the estate of Sir William de London in the counties of Kildare and Meath during the minority of his son and heir, John de London. On 5 August 1389 he was enfeoffed in the manors of Lucan, County Dublin, Kildrought (now Celbridge), and Kilmacredock, County Kildare, held from the Crown in capite for him and his heirs forever.

On 29 May 1390, a Writ was issued to him to remove O'Connor, son of Dough O'Dempsie, the King's Irish enemy currently detained in Kildare Castle, to Dublin Castle for safer custody.

He died at an advanced age in 1390, and was interred in the Church of the Holy Trinity, now Christ Church Cathedral, Dublin.

The Annales Hiberniae record that in 1347, after having been with the King at the siege of Calais, which was surrendered on 4 June, Maurice Fitz Thomas, Earl of Kildare was knighted by the King, and married to the daughter of Sir Bartholomew Burghersh the elder and his wife Elizabeth de Verdun, one of the heiresses of Theobald de Verdun, 2nd Baron Verdon. His wife is widely noted as being called Elizabeth. It is very clear that her father was Bartholomew Burghersh the elder. The reason we can be so certain is that her brother Henry's Inquisition Post Mortem was recorded in 1349. It records that he was the son of Bartholomew de Burghersh and that his heir was his brother Bartholomew, son of Bartholomew de Burghersh, aged 26 years and more. If this younger Bartholomew was aged 26 or more in 1349, he cannot have had a daughter who married Maurice Fitzgerald in 1347.

He had issue as follows:

- Gerald FitzGerald, 5th Earl of Kildare
- John FitzGerald, de jure 6th Earl of Kildare; on his brother's death he failed to take possession of the Earldom, but was the father of
  - Thomas FitzGerald, 7th Earl of Kildare
- Thomas FitzGerald, High Sheriff of County Limerick
- Joanne, who married Donal Reagh MacCarthy, 5th Prince of Carbery.

Peerage of Ireland
Preceded by Richard FitzGerald	Earl of Kildare; 1329–1390	Succeeded by Gerald FitzGerald
