= Lord John FitzGerald =

Peer, army officer and horse racing trainer and administrator

Lord John FitzGerald (3 March 1952 – 3 August 2015) was an Irish nobleman, British Army officer, racehorse trainer, and horseracing administrator.

Lord John was born in Dublin, the second son of Gerald, 8th Duke of Leinster, and his second wife, Anne, daughter of Lt-Col Philip Smith, MC, TD. He was born in Dublin and educated at Millfield School, Street, Somerset.

== Career ==
After Millfield, FitzGerald trained at the Royal Military Academy Sandhurst, and was commissioned into the 5th Royal Inniskilling Dragoon Guards, with periods of service with the British Army of the Rhine and in Cyprus. He reached the rank of Captain. Upon leaving the British Army FitzGerald entered the horseracing industry, he had in fact ridden extensively as an amateur jockey during his time in the British Army, and now pursued a career as a racehorse trainer in Newmarket.

During his first season as licensed trainer, FitzGerald won the Norfolk Stakes at the 1986 Royal Ascot meeting with the horse called Sizzling Melody who became a leading sprinter of his generation also winning the Flying Childers Stakes at Doncaster, and the Prix du Petit Couvert at Longchamp as well as being placed in the 1987 William Hill Sprint Championship at York.

In 1992, Sheikh Mohammed Bin Rashid Al Maktoum recruited FitzGerald to administer horseracing in Dubai, with the aim of establishing the necessary conditions regulatory environment needed to host top class international races. FitzGerald oversaw the creation of the internationally recognised Emirates Racing Authority, the expansion to world-class standards of the country's biggest racetrack, Nad Al Sheba, and the founding in 1996 of the Dubai World Cup, the world's richest horse race.

FitzGerald concluded his career by returning to Newmarket and working, up until his death, as racing manager for Kirsten Rausing at the Lanwades Stud in Kennett.

== Personal life ==
Lord John FitzGerald married Barbara Zindel (1956/1957), daughter of Andreas Zindel, of Lausanne, and wife Danielle, of Lausanne and St. Moritz, Switzerland, at St. Nicholas Church, Chadlington, Oxford, on 11 December 1982; they divorced in 2013 and FitzGerald died on 3 August 2015. Lord and Lady John FitzGerald had two children:

- Hermione FitzGerald (born Newmarket, Suffolk, 11 October 1985), a professional golfer; and
- Edward FitzGerald (born Newmarket, Suffolk, 27 October 1988), the current heir presumptive to the dukedom of Leinster and other family titles. He married on 5 August 2017 to Laura Caroline Tellwright (1987), daughter of William Kirkland Tellwright (Stoke-on-Trent, April or June 1956) and wife (9 May 1981) Hon. Caroline Fiona Fitzherbert (13 October 1956), paternal granddaughter of William Anthony Tellwright (Stoke-on-Trent, January or March 1928) and wife (Marylebone, London, October or December 1953) Dora J. Glazebrook (Marylebone, London, July or September 1934) and maternal granddaughter of Basil Francis Nicholas Fitzherbert, 14th Baron Stafford (7 April 1926 - 1986) and wife (16 June 1952) Morag Nada Campbell (Southam, October or December 1932), and has issue:
  - Eve FitzGerald (London, 24 March 2020).
  - Amelia FitzGerald (London, 2 October 2021)
  - Hector John FitzGerald (Bury St Edmunds, Suffolk, 20 September 2025)
