= John FitzGerald, 1st Earl of Kildare =

Anglo-Norman nobleman in Ireland

John FitzThomas (c. 1250 – d. 10 September 1316) was an Anglo-Norman in the Peerage of Ireland, as 4th Lord of Offaly from 1287 and subsequently as 1st Earl of Kildare from 1316.

== Life ==
He was the eldest son of Thomas FitzMaurice (son of Maurice FitzGerald) and Rohesia de St. Michel. He is noticed in 1291 in a serious dispute with William de Vesci, Lord of Kildare, Lord Justice of Ireland, about whom there were many complaints of oppression and neglect of the country's defences. As champion of the complainants John FitzThomas, by then 4th Lord of Offaly (having succeeded to the title in 1287, upon the death of his uncle Maurice FitzGerald, 3rd Lord of Offaly), their paths crossed and instead of addressing the issues, de Vesci charged FitzThomas with minor charges of slander and libel, some touching the King himself. FitzThomas appealed to King Edward I of England, who, to examine and judge the matter impartially, summoned them both to London to hear the cases, where it appears FitzThomas had the advantage, challenging the Lord Justice to clear his name by trial by combat, which was accepted. However, de Vesci fled to France, whereupon the King pronounced Lord Offaly innocent, and settled upon him de Vesci's lordships and manors of Kildare, Rathangan, &c., which had been forfeited to the Crown.

FitzThomas, perhaps inevitably, clashed with the powerful and expansionist magnate Richard de Burgh, 2nd Earl of Ulster. Their quarrel was at its height in 1294-5 when FitzThomas captured de Burgh and imprisoned him at Lea Castle for several months "to the disturbance of the whole land". The Parliament of Ireland eventually secured de Burgh's release. FitzThomas, though he was indicted at Westminster for a number of very serious offences, obtained a royal pardon for all of them except those against de Burgh, to whom he was forced to surrender his lands in Connacht. Thereafter he and de Burgh were on reasonably amicable terms, and FitzThomas's eldest son married de Burgh's daughter Joan.

In 1296 and 1299 he was summoned to fight for the Crown in the Scottish campaigns of Edward II. With Sir John Wogan, Justiciar of Ireland, and others he went a third time to war in Scotland in 1301-2.

In 1307, with his son-in-law Sir Edmund Butler, he dispersed rebels in Offaly who had razed the castle of Geashill and burnt the town of Leix. In 1312 he was sent as General at the head of an army into Munster to suppress armed Irish rebels. On 25 May 1315, Edward Bruce, brother to King Robert the Bruce of Scotland, entered the north of Ireland with 6000 men, was crowned King of Ireland at Dundalk, and wasted the country. Lord Offaly, among others, commenced vigorous sporadic warfare to resist Bruce, leaving "great slaughter" of Scots and the Irish irregulars in his service. Edward Bruce was eventually defeated and killed in the battle of Dundalk.

King Edward II created Fitzgerald Earl of Kildare by Letters Patent dated 14 May 1316, the year in which he founded the Augustinian priory at Adare, County Limerick.

He died that same year, on Sunday 12 September 1316, at Laraghbryan, near Maynooth and was interred in the Franciscan Friary of Clan, Kildare.

== Family ==
He married Blanche de La Roche, daughter of John de La Roche, Lord Fermoy and Maud Waley (daughter of Henry Waley), by whom he had two sons and two daughters:

- Gerald (d.1303)
- Thomas FitzGerald, 2nd Earl of Kildare, his successor.
- Joan FitzGerald, married in 1302 to Edmund Butler, Earl of Carrick.
- Elizabeth FitzGerald, married to Sir Nicholas de Netterville, ancestor of Viscount Netterville.

Peerage of Ireland
New creation	Earl of Kildare; 1316	Succeeded by Thomas FitzGerald
