= William FitzGerald, 13th Earl of Kildare =

William FitzGerald, 13th Earl of Kildare (c. 1563 – March 1599) was an Irish nobleman.

== Biography ==
FitzGerald was the third son of Gerald FitzGerald, 11th Earl of Kildare and Mabel Browne, and the younger brother of Henry, the 12th Earl.

Returning from a visit to England in March 1599, prepared to accompany Robert Devereux, 2nd Earl of Essex in the war against Hugh O'Neill, Earl of Tyrone, he perished at sea with "eighteen of the chiefs of Meath and Fingall".

FitzGerald also succeeded to the title of 3rd Baron of Offaly on 1 August 1597.

== Notes ==
Peerage of Ireland
Preceded by Henry FitzGerald	Earl of Kildare; 1597–1599	Succeeded by Gerald FitzGerald
Preceded by Henry FitzGerald	Baron Offaly; 1597–1599	Extinct
