= Gerald FitzGerald, 5th Earl of Kildare =

Irish peer

Gerald FitzMaurice FitzGerald, 5th Earl of Kildare (d. before 24 June 1428) was an Irish peer. Gerald was the son of Maurice FitzGerald, 4th Earl of Kildare and Elizabeth Burghersh.

== Career ==
Gerald served as Justiciar of Ireland in 1405. In 1407 he defeated the O'Carrol clan at Kilkenny. About 1418 he emerged as a leading opponent of the Lord Lieutenant of Ireland, John Talbot, 1st Earl of Shrewsbury. Together with Christopher Preston, 2nd Baron Gormanston, he was accused of treasonable correspondence with Thomas Le Boteller, the Prior of the Order of Hospitallers at Kilmainham, imprisoned and threatened with forfeiture of his titles and estates. No plausible evidence of treason was produced against either Kildare or Gormanston, and they were released and restored to their estates. It is unlikely that either of these elderly pillars of the Anglo-Irish establishment were guilty of anything more serious than opposition to Shrewsbury's policies.

He was buried at the Grey Abbey at Kildare.

== Family ==
Gerald married, firstly, Margaret Rocheford, daughter of Sir John Rocheford. Their children included:

- Thomas FitzGerald, died before his father without issue.
- Lady Joan FitzGerald d. Jul 1452, married James Butler, 4th Earl of Ormonde , who claimed the Kildare title in right of his wife.

He married secondly, Agnes Darcy, daughter of Philip Darcy, 4th Baron Darcy de Knayth and Elizabeth Gray. Their children included:

- Elizabeth FitzGerald, who married John Grey, 2nd Baron Grey of Codnor.

He reputedly had one illegitimate son, Richard. He has been identified as Richard FitzGerald of Ballysonan, who married into the Castlemartin family, and was the ancestor of the Baron of Dunsany.

Since his only legitimate son predeceased him the title should have passed to his brother John, de jure 6th Earl, although his son-in-law, the Earl of Ormonde, also claimed the title in right of his wife, Joan. The dispute was eventually resolved in favour of John's son Thomas FitzGerald, 7th Earl of Kildare.

Peerage of Ireland
Preceded by Maurice FitzGerald	Earl of Kildare; 1390–1432	Succeeded by John FitzGerald (de jure)
