= Frederick Schomberg, 1st Duke of Schomberg =

German-born army officer (1615–1690)

General His Grace The Duke of Schomberg KG PC
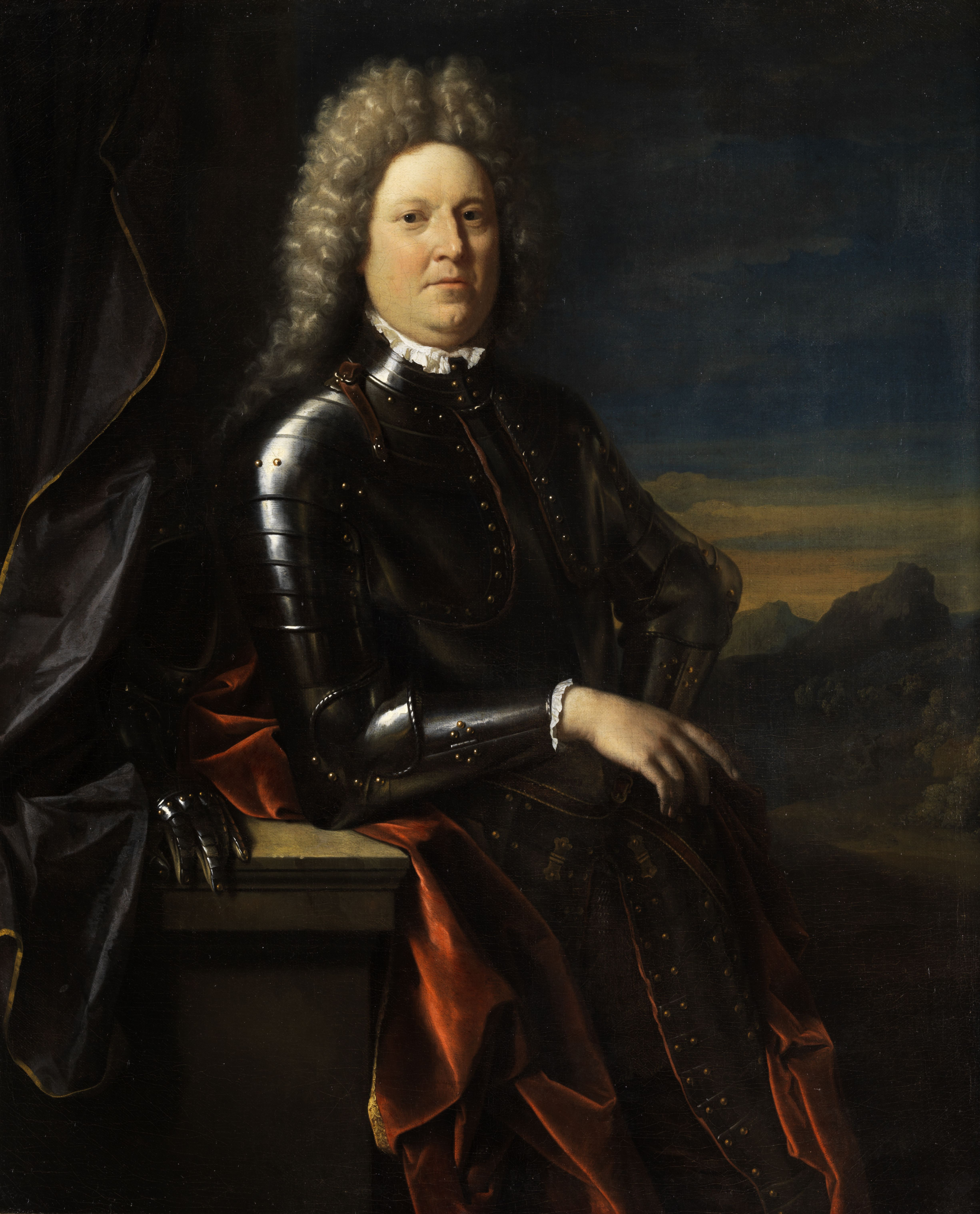
- Portrait attributed to Adriaen van der Werff

Master-General of the Ordnance
- In office 1689–1690
- Monarch: William III
- Preceded by: The Lord Dartmouth
- Succeeded by: The Earl of Romney

Personal details
- Born: Friedrich Hermann von Schönberg; 6 December 1615 Heidelberg, Electoral Palatinate
- Died: 1 July 1690 (aged 74) Oldbridge, County Meath, Kingdom of Ireland
- Spouse: Johanna Elizabeth (m. 1638)
- Children: 6, including Charles and Meinhardt
- Parent(s): Hans Meinhard von Schönberg; Anne Sutton

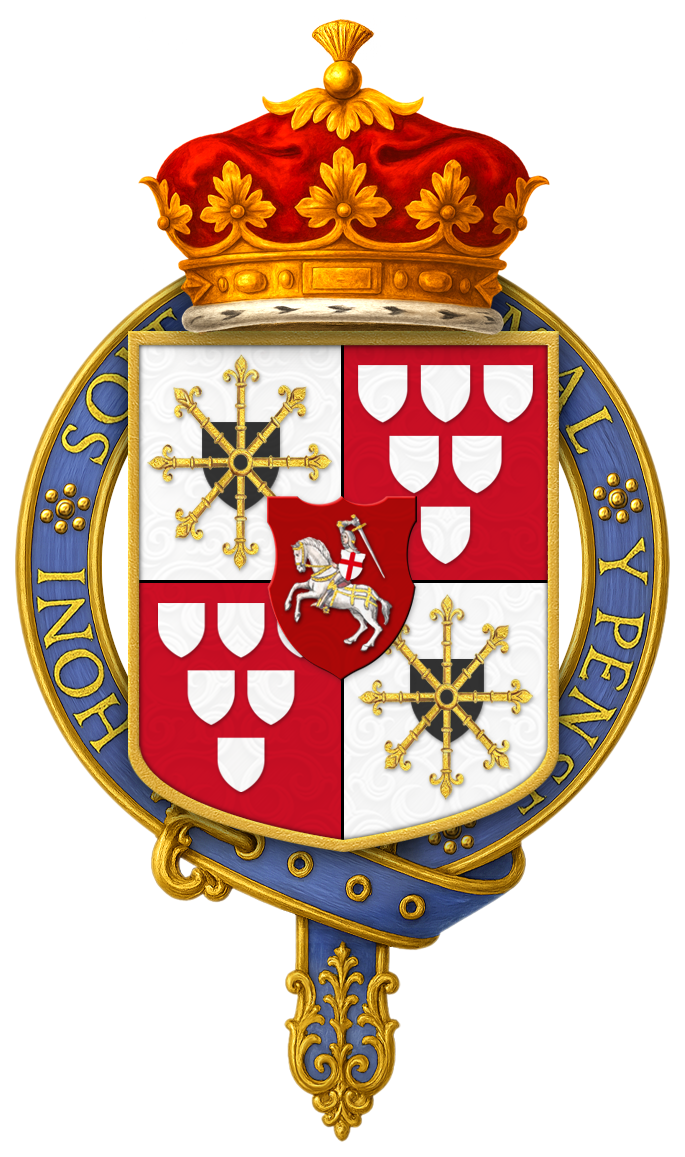
Quartered arms of Friedrich Hermann von Schönberg, 1st Duke of Schomberg, KG

Frederick Herman de Schomberg, 1st Duke of Schomberg (6 December 1615 – 1 July 1690) was a German-born army officer who served in the French, Portuguese, Dutch and English armies, he was killed in action fighting on the Williamite side at the Battle of the Boyne in 1690.

== Early career ==
Descended from an old family of the Electorate of the Palatinate, he was born at Heidelberg, the son of Count Hans Meinhard von Schönberg (1582–1616) and Anne, a daughter of Edward Sutton, 5th Baron Dudley, and Theodosia Harington. An orphan within a few months of his birth, he was educated by various family friends, among whom was Elector Frederick V of the Palatinate, in whose service his father had been. He began his military career under Frederick Henry, Prince of Orange, and in 1634 passed into the service of Sweden, entering that of France in 1635. His family, and the allied house of the Saxon Schönbergs, had already attained eminence in France with Henri de Schomberg and Charles de Schomberg, both marshals of France.

After a time he retired to his family estate at Geisenheim on the Rhine, but in 1639 he re-entered the Dutch States Army, in which, apparently, apart from a few intervals at Geisenheim, he remained until about 1650. He then rejoined the French army as a general officer (maréchal de camp), and served under Turenne in the Fronde, against Condé. He became a lieutenant-general in 1665, receiving this rapid promotion perhaps partly owing to his relationship with Charles de Schomberg.

Portugal was at this time fighting to regain independence from Spain. In 1662, Schomberg was sent there as military adviser with the secret approval of Charles II of England. Louis XIV of France, constrained by the 1659 Treaty of the Pyrenees with Spain, deprived Schomberg of his French officers. Schomberg instead took command of the "English brigade", 3,000 men in three regiments. Many of these were former Royalist and New Model Army troops from the Civil War. After many difficulties in the first three campaigns resulting from the opposition of Portuguese officers, Schomberg and Portuguese commander Meneses defeated the Spanish in the Montes Claros on 17 June 1665. In 1663, King Afonso VI made him a Grandee, created him Count of Mértola and awarded him a pension of £5,000 a year.

In 1667, he participated with his army in the palace revolution which stripped Alfonso of power, led by his brother Pedro, who became regent and ended the war with Spain in 1668.

Schomberg returned to France, became a naturalised Frenchman and bought the lordship of Coubert near Paris. In 1673 he was brought by Charles II to England to take command of the newly formed Blackheath Army, intended for an invasion of the Dutch Republic during the Third Anglo-Dutch War. However the army did not go into action before the Treaty of Westminster (1674) established peace, and was disbanded by the King following Parliamentary pressure.

He therefore again entered the service of France. His first operations in Catalonia were unsuccessful owing to the disobedience of subordinates and the rawness of his troops. On 19 June 1674, he was dealt a defeat at the Battle of Maureillas by Francisco de Tutavilla y del Rufo, but he retrieved the failure by retaking Fort de Bellegarde in 1675. For this he was made a marshal, being included in the promotion that followed the death of Turenne. The tide had now turned against the Huguenots, and Schomberg's merits had been long ignored on account of his adherence to the Protestant religion. The revocation of the Edict of Nantes (1685) forced him to leave his adopted country.

Ultimately he became general-in-chief of the forces of Frederick William, Elector of Brandenburg, and at Berlin he was the acknowledged leader of the thousands of Huguenot refugees there. Soon afterwards, with the Elector's consent, he joined William of Orange on his invasion of England in 1688 (the Glorious Revolution) as second in command. The following year he was made a Knight of the Garter, was appointed Master-General of the Ordnance, was created Duke of Schomberg, and received from Parliament a grant of £100,000 to compensate him for the loss of his French estates, seized by Louis XIV.

== Ireland ==
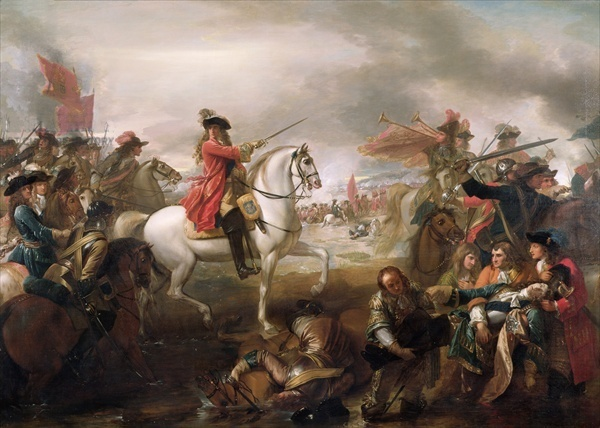
Benjamin West's Battle of the Boyne (1778) shows the death of Schomberg in the bottom right-hand corner.

In July 1689, William appointed him commander-in-chief of the expedition that he undertook to drive James II out of Ireland. Before departing to Ireland, Schomberg took his leave from parliament on 16 July 1689. On 20 July Schomberg arrived at Chester where the expedition's troops were gathering. Sailing with a fleet from Hoylake, he landed on 13 August 1689 at Ballyholme Bay near Bangor. He made the passage on the royal yacht Cleveland. He then marched over Bangor and Belfast to Carrickfergus, which had a Jacobite garrison. He began the siege of Carrickfergus on 20 August. The town surrendered on 28 August. Thereafter he marched unopposed through a country desolated before him to Dundalk, but, as the bulk of his forces were raw and undisciplined as well as inferior in numbers to the enemy Irish Army, he deemed it imprudent to risk a battle, and entrenching himself at Dundalk declined to be drawn beyond the circle of his defences. Shortly afterwards pestilence broke out, and when he retired to winter quarters in Ulster his forces were more shattered than if they had sustained a severe defeat.

His conduct was criticized in ill-informed quarters, but the facts justified his inactivity, and he gave what was said at the time to be a "striking example of his generous spirit" in placing at William of Orange's disposal for military purposes the £100,000 recently granted to him. In the spring he began the campaign with the capture of Charlemont, but no advance southward was made until William arrived with reinforcements. At the Battle of the Boyne (1 July 1690 O.S.), Schomberg gave his opinion against the determination of William to cross the river in face of the opposing army. After riding through the river to rally his men, he was wounded twice in the head by sabre cuts, and was shot in the neck by Cahir O'Toole of Ballyhubbock and instantly killed.

== Family ==
His eldest son Charles Schomberg, the second duke in the English peerage, died in the year 1693 of wounds received at the Battle of Marsaglia. His other son was Meinhardt Schomberg, 3rd Duke of Schomberg.

== Burial and inscription ==
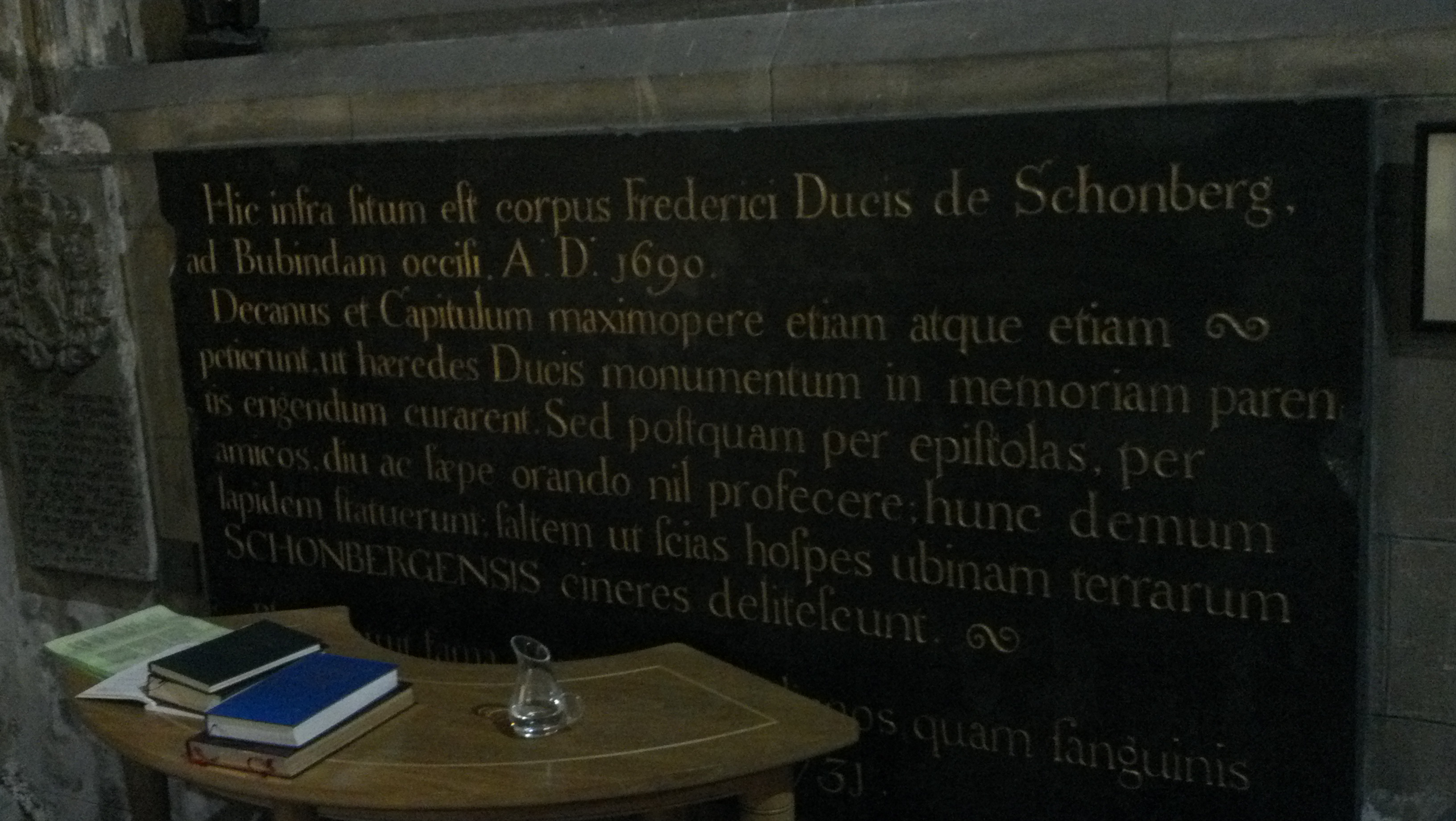
Latin inscription to the memory of Schomberg in St Patrick's Cathedral, Dublin, Ireland.

He was buried in St Patrick's Cathedral, Dublin, where there is a monument to him, erected in 1731. On the monument is a Latin inscription by Jonathan Swift, which reads:

Hic infra situm est corpus Frederici Ducis de Schonberg, ad Bubindam occisi, A.D. 1690. Decanus et Capitulum maximopere etiam atque etiam petierunt, ut haeredes Ducis monumentum in memoriam parentis erigendum curarent. Sed postquam per epistolas, per amicos, diu ac saepe orando nil profecere; hunc demum lapidem statuerunt; saltem ut scias, hospes, ubinam terrarum SCHONBERGENSIS cineres delitescunt. Plus potuit fama virtutis apud alienos quam sanguinis proximitas apud suos. A.D. 1731

The English translation:

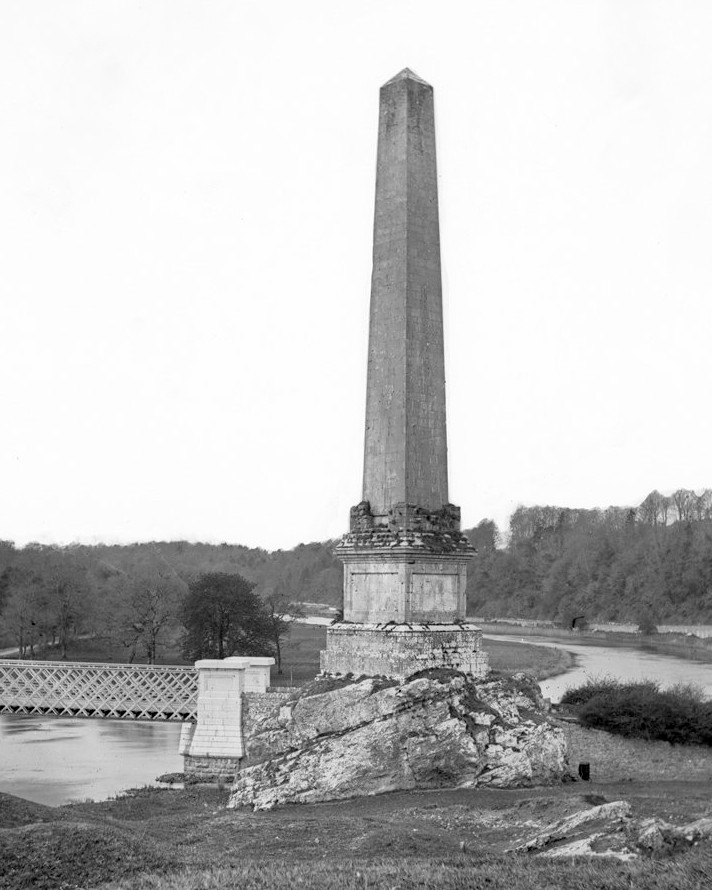
The former Boyne Obelisk (c.1890), Oldbridge, County Louth, Ireland.

Here below is placed the body of Frederick, Duke of Schomberg, killed at the Boyne, A.D. 1690. The dean and the chapter fervently sought, again and again, that the heirs of the Duke see to the erection of a monument in memory of (their) parent. But, after asking for a long time and often, through letters, through friends, they accomplished nothing; finally they set up this stone; so that at least, visitor, you might know where in the world the ashes of Schomberg are concealed. The fame of his valor had more influence among strangers than the relationships of blood did among his own (family). A.D. 1731

Additionally, the Boyne Obelisk (which was erected on the north bank of the River Boyne in 1736, to commemorate the Williamite victory at the Battle of the Boyne, and later destroyed in 1923) contained an inscription to him on its south side base, reading:

Marshal the Duke of Schomberg in passing this river died bravely fighting in defence of liberty

The village of Schomberg, Ontario is named after him.

== Notes ==
Military offices
Preceded by The Earl of Dumbarton	Colonel of His Majesty's Royal Regiment of Foot; 1689–1690	Succeeded by Sir Robert Douglas, Bt
Preceded by The Lord Dartmouth	Master-General of the Ordnance; 1689–1690	Vacant Title next held by The Earl of Romney
Portuguese nobility
New creation	Count of Mértola; 1663–1690	Succeeded by Meinhardt Schomberg
Peerage of England
New creation	Duke of Schomberg; 1689–1690	Succeeded by Charles Schomberg
