= Gerald FitzGerald, 14th Earl of Kildare =

Irish peer

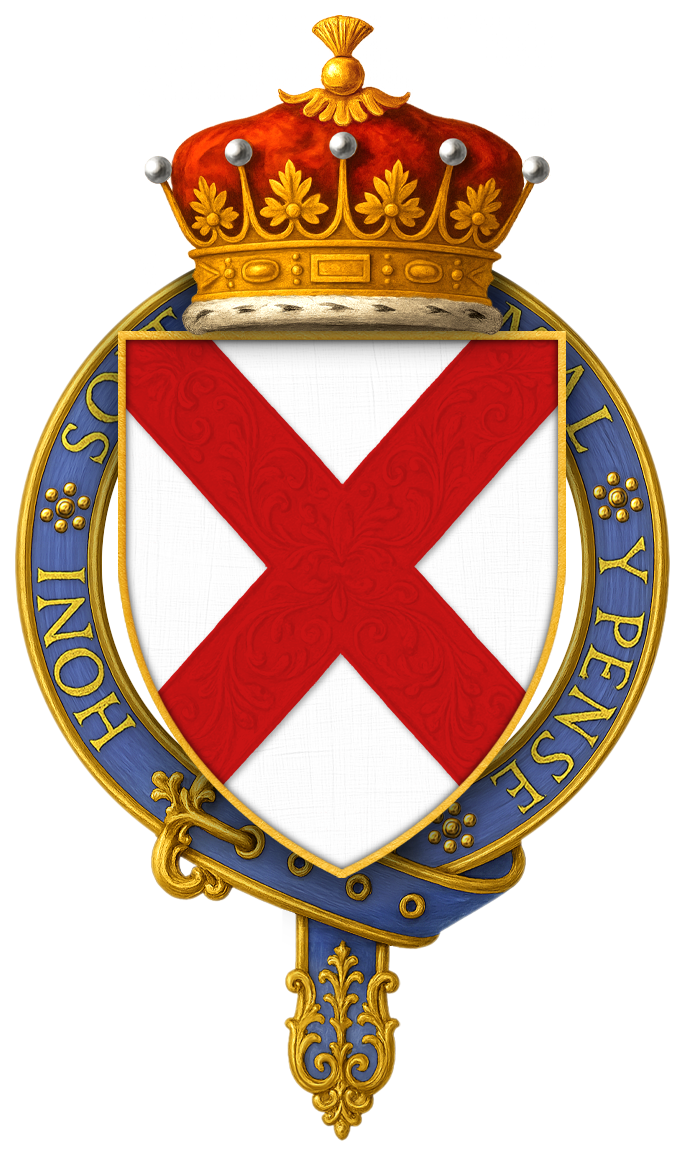
Coat of arms of Sir Gerard FitzGerald

Gerald FitzGerald, 14th Earl of Kildare (died 11 February 1612) was an Irish peer. Much of his adult life was dominated by litigation with relatives over the Kildare inheritance.

== Background ==
Lord Kildare was the son of Edward FitzGerald, younger son of Gerald FitzGerald, 9th Earl of Kildare and his second wife Elizabeth Grey, a cousin of Henry VIII. Edward married Agnes Leigh, daughter of Sir John Leigh of Stockwell, Surrey, who was a half-brother of Queen Catherine Howard, the fifth queen of Henry VIII, both of them being children of Joyce Culpepper. Agnes was the widow of Sir Thomas Paston, of the famous Norfolk family who produced the Paston Letters.

== Career ==
Lord Kildare was knighted in 1599 and succeeded his cousin William as Earl of Kildare that same year. He served as Governor of Offaly in 1600 and was Commissioner of Connaught in 1604.

The last decade of his life was much troubled by a long-running lawsuit brought against him by his cousin Lettice and her husband. Lettice, only child of the eldest son of Gerald FitzGerald, 11th Earl of Kildare and his countess, Mabel Browne, had expected to inherit a substantial part of her grandfather's estate, but shortly before his death in 1585 she was disinherited by deed. In 1602 she sued both Kildare and her aged grandmother, alleging that Countess Mabel had forged or fraudulently altered the deed and that Kildare as a result was unlawfully in occupation of her property. Kildare filed a countersuit alleging, rather implausibly, that the action was collusive and that Mabel and Lettice were conspiring to deprive him of his property. The case, which became quite celebrated, dragged on for years with hearings in several courts in both London and Dublin. Kildare complained bitterly of the disgrace to his honour and impoverishment of his estate, but was unable to bring proceedings to a resolution; the case continued even after both he and Mabel were dead.

== Family ==
Lord Kildare married his cousin Elizabeth Nugent, daughter of Christopher Nugent, 5th Baron Delvin and Lady Mary FitzGerald, daughter of the 11th Earl of Kildare. She was still living in 1634, when she leased Kilkea Castle, County Kildare, a long-standing FitzGerald residence, to the Jesuit Order.

He died suddenly at Maynooth in February 1612 after complaining of a "pain in his stomach" and was succeeded in the earldom by his infant son, Gerald, who died young in 1620.

Peerage of Ireland
Preceded by William FitzGerald	Earl of Kildare; 1599–1611	Succeeded by Gerald FitzGerald
