= Gerald FitzGerald, 5th Duke of Leinster =

Anglo-Irish peer

His Grace The Duke of Leinster
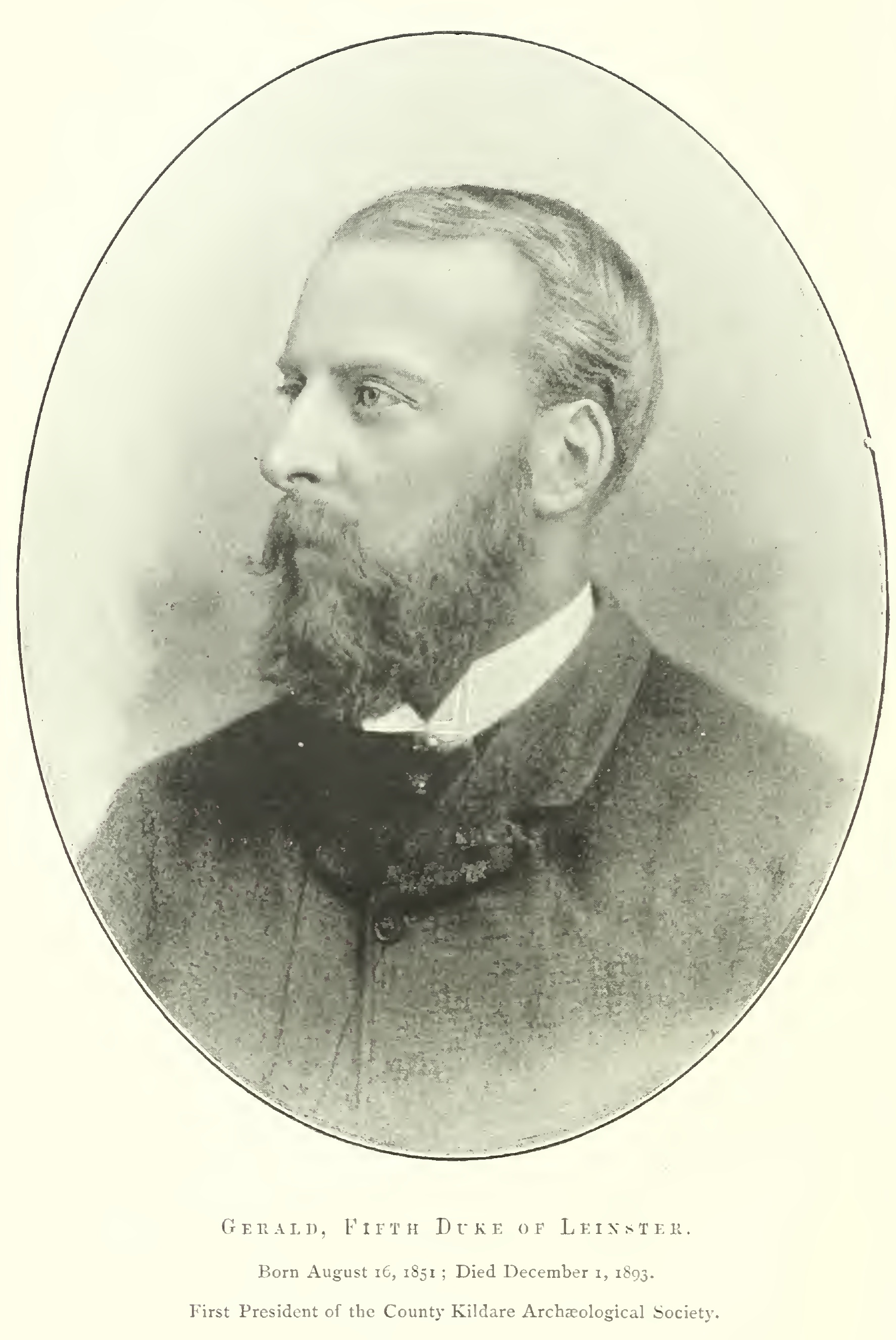
- Gerald FitzGerald, 5th Duke of Leinster

Duke of Leinster
- Preceded by: Charles FitzGerald, 4th Duke of Leinster
- Succeeded by: Maurice FitzGerald, 6th Duke of Leinster

Personal details
- Born: 16 August 1851
- Died: 1 December 1893 (aged 42)
- Spouse: Hermione Wilhelmina Duncombe
- Children: Maurice FitzGerald, 6th Duke of Leinster; Lord Desmond FitzGerald; Edward FitzGerald, 7th Duke of Leinster
- Parents: Charles FitzGerald, 4th Duke of Leinster; Lady Caroline Sutherland-Leveson-Gower

Gerald FitzGerald, 5th Duke of Leinster (16 August 1851 – 1 December 1893) was an Anglo-Irish peer.

== Biography ==
Leinster was born in Dublin, Ireland, the son of the 4th Duke of Leinster and Lady Caroline Sutherland-Leveson-Gower, daughter of the 2nd Duke of Sutherland.

He married Lady Hermione Wilhelmina Duncombe (30 March 1864 – Menton, France, 19 March 1895), daughter of the 1st Earl of Feversham, in London on 17 January 1884. It was not a happy marriage. She died of tuberculosis at age 30.

The Leinsters had the following children:

- Unnamed daughter (born 1885 – died 5 February 1886)
- Maurice FitzGerald, 6th Duke of Leinster (1 March 1887 – 4 February 1922)
- Major Lord Desmond FitzGerald (21 September 1888 – 3 March 1916), killed in World War I — buried in France with the gravestone inscription: "FAITHFUL UNTO DEATH". (Note: According to Rudyard Kipling, FitzGerald "was so severely wounded that he died within an hour at the Millicent Sutherland (No. 9. Red Cross Hospital). Lieutenant T. E. G. Nugent was dangerously wounded at the same time through the liver, though he did not realise this at the time, and stayed coolly in charge of a party till help came. Lieutenant Hanbury, who was conducting the practice, was wounded in the hand and leg, and Father Lane-Fox lost an eye and some fingers. Lord Desmond FitzGerald was buried in the public cemetery at Calais on the 5th. As he himself had expressly desired, there was no formal parade, but the whole Battalion, of which he was next for the command, lined the road to his grave. His passion and his loyalty had been given to the Battalion without thought of self, and among many sad things, few are sadder than to see the record of his unceasing activities and care since he had been second in command cut across by the curt announcement of his death. It was a little thing that his name had been at the time submitted for a well-deserved D.S.O.")
- Edward FitzGerald, 7th Duke of Leinster (6 May 1892 – 8 March 1976), whose alleged biological father was Hugo Charteris, 11th Earl of Wemyss.

After the 5th Duke's death of typhoid fever, his stamp collection, which contained around ten thousand pieces, was bequeathed to the Dublin Museum of Science and Art. It included an Inverted Swan which he had discovered was inverted years after he took possession of it.

== Ancestry ==
Ancestors of Gerald FitzGerald, 5th Duke of Leinster

16. James FitzGerald, 1st Duke of Leinster
8. William FitzGerald, 2nd Duke of Leinster
17. Lady Emily Lennox
4. Augustus FitzGerald, 3rd Duke of Leinster
18. St George St George, 1st Baron St George
9. The Hon. Emilia St George
19. Elizabeth Dominick
2. Charles FitzGerald, 4th Duke of Leinster
20. William Stanhope, 2nd Earl of Harrington
10. Charles Stanhope, 3rd Earl of Harrington
21. Lady Caroline FitzRoy
5. Lady Charlotte Stanhope
22. Sir John Fleming, 1st Baronet
11. Jane Fleming
23. Jane Coleman
1. Gerald FitzGerald, 5th Duke of Leinster
24. Granville Leveson-Gower, 1st Marquess of Stafford
12. George Leveson-Gower, 1st Duke of Sutherland
25. Lady Louisa Egerton
6. George Sutherland-Leveson-Gower, 2nd Duke of Sutherland
26. William Gordon, 18th Earl of Sutherland
13. Elizabeth Gordon, 19th Countess of Sutherland
27. Mary Maxwell
3. Lady Caroline Sutherland-Leveson-Gower
28. Frederick Howard, 5th Earl of Carlisle
14. George Howard, 6th Earl of Carlisle
29. Lady Margaret Leveson-Gower
7. Lady Harriet Howard
30. William Cavendish, 5th Duke of Devonshire
15. Lady Georgiana Cavendish
31. Lady Georgiana Spencer

== Sources and references ==
Peerage of Ireland
Preceded by Charles FitzGerald	Duke of Leinster; 1887–1893	Succeeded by Maurice FitzGerald
