= Plunkett =

Plunkett is a surname associated with Ireland, possibly of Norse or Norman origin; it may be spelled O'Plunket, Plunket, Plunkit, Plunkitt, Plonkit, Plonkitt, Plonket, Plonkett, Ó Plunceid, or Ó Pluingceid and may refer to:

== Middle Ages ==
- Richard Plunkett (1340–1393), Lord Chancellor of Ireland, ancestor of the Barons of Dunsany, Barons of Killeen, and Earls of Fingall

== Dunsany family ==
- Baron of Dunsany
- Christopher Plunkett, 1st Baron of Dunsany (1410–1463)
- Thomas Fitz-Christopher Plunket (c.1407–1471), Lord Chief Justice of Ireland, brother of the 1st Baron of Dunsany
- Sir Thomas Plunket (1440–1519), Chief Justice of the Common Pleas for Ireland, nephew of the 1st Baron of Dunsany
- Randal Edward Sherborne Plunkett (1848–1883), politician, son of the 16th Baron of Dunsany
- Sir Horace Curzon Plunkett (1854–1932), Irish unionist and agricultural reformer, son of the 16th Baron of Dunsany
- John William Plunkett, 17th Baron of Dunsany (1853–1899)
- Reginald Plunkett (1880–1967), a British admiral, sometimes called Reginald Aylmer Ranfurly Plunkett-Ernle-Erle-Drax or Reginald Drax, son of the 17th Baron of Dunsany
- Edward Plunkett, 18th Baron of Dunsany (1878–1957), an Anglo-Irish writer. His pen name was Lord Dunsany
- Randal Arthur Henry Plunkett, 19th Baron of Dunsany (1906–1999)
- Edward John Carlos Plunkett, 20th Baron of Dunsany (1939–2011)
- Randal Plunkett, 21st Baron of Dunsany (1983–)

== Killeen and Fingall family ==
- Barons Killeen and Earls of Fingall
- Christopher Plunket, 1st Baron Killeen (d. 1445)
- John Plunket (c.1497–1582), Lord Chief Justice of Ireland, great-great-grandson of the 1st Baron Killeen
- Luke Plunkett, 10th Baron Killeen, 1st Earl of Fingall (d. 1637)
- Christopher Plunkett, 2nd Earl of Fingall (d. 1649)
- Arthur Plunkett, 8th Earl of Fingall (1759–1836)
- Arthur Plunkett, 9th Earl of Fingall (1791–1869)
- Saint Oliver Plunkett (1625–1681), Roman Catholic Archbishop of Armagh and martyr, 1st cousin of Luke Plunkett
- Sir Nicholas Plunkett (1602–1680), Irish confederate
- Sir Francis Richard Plunkett (1835–1907), British diplomat

== Family of George Noble Plunkett ==
Distant cousins of the families of Dunsany, Killeen, and Fingall

- George Noble Plunkett (1851–1948), Irish republican and papal count
- Joseph Mary Plunkett (1887–1916), Irish republican, son of George Noble Plunkett
- Geraldine "Gerry" (Plunkett) Dillon (1891–1986), daughter of George Noble Plunkett
- George Oliver Plunkett (1894–1944), Irish republican, son of George Noble Plunkett
- Fiona Plunkett (1896 - 1977), daughter of George Noble Plunkett

== Family of Baron Plunket ==
Baron Plunket is a title in the Peerage of the United Kingdom

- William Conyngham Plunket, 1st Baron Plunket (1764–1854), Lord Chancellor of Ireland, Whig MP for Dublin University
- Thomas Span Plunket, 2nd Baron Plunket (1792–1866), Bishop of Tuam, Killala and Achon
- John Span Plunket, 3rd Baron Plunket QC (1793–1871)
- Katherine Plunket (1820–1932), the oldest person ever to be born and die in Ireland, daughter of Thomas Span Plunket
- Louisa Lilias Plunket Greene (1833–1891), author, daughter of John Span Plunket
- Frederica Louise Edith Plunket (1838–1886), daughter of Thomas Span Plunket
- William Conyngham Plunket, 4th Baron Plunket (1828–1897), Church of Ireland Bishop of Meath and later Archbishop of Dublin
- David Plunket, 1st Baron Rathmore QC (1838–1919), Conservative MP for Dublin University, son of John Span Plunket
- William Lee Plunket, 5th Baron Plunket (1864–1920), Governor General of New Zealand
- Benjamin John Plunket (1870–1947), Church of Ireland Bishop of Tuam, Killala and Achonry and later Bishop of Meath, son of William Conyngham Plunket
- Terence Conyngham Plunket, 6th Baron Plunket (1899–1938)
- Patrick Terence William Span Plunket, 7th Baron Plunket (1923–1975), Equerry to King George VI and later Deputy Master of the Household to Queen Elizabeth II
- Robin Rathmore Plunket, 8th Baron Plunket (1925–2013), supporter and advocate of Zimbabwean Independence and racial harmony
- Tyrone Shaun Terence Plunket, 9th Baron Plunket (born 1966), Page of Honour to HM Queen Elizabeth II

== Baron Louth family ==
- Oliver Plunkett, 1st Baron Louth (second creation) (d. 1555)
- Matthew Plunkett, 7th Baron Louth (died September 1689)

== Others ==
- Adam Plunkett (1903–1992), Scottish footballer
- Catherine Plunkett (born c.1725), eighteenth century Irish violinist
- Charles Peshall Plunkett (1864–1931), US rear admiral
- Elizabeth Gunning (translator) (1769–1823), married name Elizabeth Plunkett, novelist and translator
- Elizabeth Plunkett, 1976 victim of serial killers Geoffrey Evans and John Shaw in Ireland
- George Thomas Plunkett, Bishop of Elphin from 1814 to 1827
- George Washington Plunkitt (1842–1924), New York state senator
- Harriette Merrick Plunkett (1826–1906), American sanitary reform leader
- James Plunkett, pen name of James Plunkett Kelly (1920–2003), an Irish writer
- Jim Plunkett, NFL quarterback
- John Plunket (1664–1738), Irish Jacobite
- John Plunkett, (1802–1869), Attorney-General of New South Wales
- Liam Plunkett, English cricketer
- Margaret Louise "Peggy" Plunkett Ph.D. (1906–2000), U.S. diplomat, labor official
- Maryann Plunkett, actress, 1987 Tony award
- Oliver Plunkett (1884–1971), Chief Justice of Saint Lucia and later a British judge in Palestine and Egypt
- Patricia Ruth Plunkett (1926-1974), actress
- Patrick Joseph Plunkett (1738–1827), Bishop of Meath
- Paul Edward Plunkett (1935–2018), American judge
- Peg Plunkett (1727–1797), brothel keeper in Dublin
- Richard Plunkett (1788–1832), Beadle or night-constable of Whitechapel, London
- Robert Plunkett (d. 1815), President of Georgetown University
- Roy J. Plunkett (1910–1994), inventor of Teflon
- Sean Plunket, New Zealand broadcast journalist
- Steve Plunkett, singer, guitarist and songwriter for the 1980s band Autograph
- Thomas Plunket, Irish rifleman in the British 95th Regiment of Foot circa 1809
- Thomas Plunkett (1840–1913), Member of the Queensland Legislative Assembly
- Thomas Plunkett (1841–1885), United States Army Sergeant, who was awarded the Medal of Honor for his actions at the Battle of Fredericksburg
- Thomas Flood "Tom" Plunkett (1878–1957), Member of the Queensland Legislative Assembly
- Walter Plunkett (1902–1982), Academy Award-winning costume designer
- William Plunkett, 18th-century highwayman in England and possibly later a colonel and magistrate in Pennsylvania
- William C. Plunkett (1799–1884), Lieutenant Governor for the Commonwealth of Massachusetts from 1854 to 1855

== See also ==
- Royal New Zealand Plunket Society
- Plunkett, Queensland, a neighbourhood in Australia
- Plunkett railway station, in Plunkett, Tamborine, Queensland, Australia
- Plunket Shield, the original New Zealand first-class cricket championship
- Plunket shark or dogfish Centroscymnus plunketi or Proscymnodon plunketi
- Plunkett, Saskatchewan
- Plunketts Creek (disambiguation), multiple uses
- Plunkett & Macleane, 1999 film
- USS Plunkett (DD-431)
- Waterford railway station in Ireland, named "Plunkett Station" since 1966
