= Nicholas Plunkett =

Anglo-Irish lawyer and politician

Sir Nicholas Plunkett

Chairman of the Confederate Assembly
- In office 1642–1652
- Monarch: Charles I
- Preceded by: Office created
- Succeeded by: Office abolished

Member of Parliament for County Meath
- In office 1634–1635
- Preceded by: Robert Barnewall
- Succeeded by: Richard Barnewall

Personal details
- Born: 1602 Killeen, County Meath, Ireland
- Died: 25 December 1680 (aged 77-78) Balrath, County Meath, Ireland
- Spouse: Catherine Turner
- Children: Jane Plunkett
- Education: Gray's Inn, London (1622); King's Inns, Dublin (1628)
- Occupation: Lawyer

Sir Nicholas Plunkett (1602–1680) was an Anglo-Irish lawyer and politician.

== Family and early life ==
He was a younger son of Christopher Plunkett, 9th Baron Killeen and Jane (or Genet) Dillon, daughter of Sir Lucas Dillon: his brother Luke was created Earl of Fingall in 1628. At the age of twenty Plunkett travelled to London to receive training as a lawyer at Gray's Inn in London, and later trained at King's Inn in Dublin.

== Career ==
=== Member of parliament and lawyer ===
By the 1630s he had established a thriving legal practice: the attempts by Thomas Wentworth, the Lord Lieutenant of Ireland, to confiscate as much Irish land as possible to the Crown, ensured that his services were in high demand. At this time he also became an MP in the Irish House of Commons, sitting for County Meath.

=== Support of Rebellion of 1641 ===
At the outbreak of the Irish Rebellion of 1641, Plunkett attempted to remain neutral. However, in mid-1642 government troops looted and torched his home in Balrath, County Meath: Plunkett unsurprisingly thereafter gave support to the leaders of the Irish Insurgents. He played a prominent role in the foundation of the Confederation of Kilkenny, sitting as chairman at the first meeting of the Confederate Assembly and was also a member of the Confederate Supreme Council (one of six members representing the province of Leinster). Plunkett was also appointed Muster-Master general.

=== Delegations and negotiations ===
In 1644 Plunkett was a member of a Confederate delegation sent to negotiate a treaty with King Charles I. The first Ormond Peace was eventually arranged in 1646, but despite Plunkett's efforts, the Catholic Clergy of Ireland rejected the treaty.

Plunkett was a deeply religious man, who impressed the Papal Nuncio, Rinuccini after his arrival in Ireland in late 1645. Even so, Plunkett was a moderate by disposition, and he thus became a leader of the moderate Confederate faction, attempting in 1647 to reconcile the supporters of Ormond and those of Rinuccini. In 1648 he once again took part in a Confederate delegation, this time to Rome, in an attempt to gain further Papal support. The Pope made Plunkett a knight of the Golden Spur, but the mission to Rome was largely a failure.

While he was in Rome a Civil War broke out in the Confederation over the Inchiquin truce of 1648. When Plunkett returned, the clerical faction of the Confederates had lost influence, and so Plunkett became involved in negotiations for a second Ormond Peace, eventually signed in early 1649.

=== Cromwell's invasion ===
Only six months later the New Model Army launched a full-scale invasion of Ireland, and within a year had conquered large areas of the island. Nicholas' nephew Christopher Plunkett, 2nd Earl of Fingall was killed at the Battle of Rathmines. Ulick Burke, 1st Marquess of Clanricarde was appointed leader of the Irish forces in late 1650, replacing the discredited Earl of Ormond. In 1651 Clanricarde sent Plunkett with Geoffrey Browne on a desperate mission to negotiate with Charles IV, the extremely wealthy Duke of Lorraine, but the mission to gain his support was not successful.

=== Restoration and return to prosperity ===
After the conquest of Ireland Plunkett had his lands confiscated and was transported to Connacht. His luck changed at the Restoration in 1660, however: the endless disputes between the dispossessed Irish landholders and the planters enabled him to restore his legal practice to its former esteem.

== Personal life and death ==
He married Catherine Turner, daughter of William Turner, an Alderman of Dublin; their daughter Jane married Valentine Browne, 1st Viscount Kenmare.

Nicholas Plunkett's brother, Patrick, was also prominent in Confederate politics, becoming Bishop of Ardagh in 1647 largely thanks to the backing of Rinuccini.

Nicholas Plunkett died on Christmas Day 1680, and was buried in Killeen, County Meath.

== Sources ==
- Ó hAnnracháin, Tadhg (2001). "Reformation and the Wars of the Three Kingdoms in Ireland: the Mission of Rinuccini, 1645-49".
- Meehan, Rev. Charles Patrick (1882). The Confederation of Kilkenny (New revised and enlarged ed.). Dublin: James Duffy. OCLC 224157081.
