= Luke Plunket, 3rd Earl of Fingall =

Irish soldier and politician (1639–1684)

Luke Plunket
- Earl of Fingall
- Tenure: 1649–1684
- Predecessor: Christopher, 2nd Earl of Fingall
- Successor: Peter, 4th Earl of Fingall
- Born: 1639
- Died: 1684 (aged 44–45)
- Spouse: Margaret MacCarthy
- Issue Detail: Peter, & others
- Father: Christopher, 2nd Earl of Fingall
- Mother: Mabel Barnewall

Luke Plunket, 3rd Earl of Fingall (1639–1684) was an Irish soldier and politician. He was one of the signatories of the Catholic Remonstrance of 1661.

== Birth and origins ==
Luke was born in 1639 in Ireland. He was the eldest son of Christopher Plunket and his wife Mabel Barnewall. His father was the 2nd Earl of Fingall (since 1637). As the eldest son, Luke held from birth on the courtesy title of Baron of Killeen. His father's family was Old English and attested in Ireland since the 11th century.

Luke's mother was the daughter of Nicholas Barnewall, 1st viscount Kingsland, and Lady Bridget FitzGerald. His parents had married in January 1636. Lucas had four brothers and one sister, who are listed in his father's article.

Family tree

Luke Plunkett with his wife, parents, and other selected relatives. (Note: This family tree is derived from two published trees, and classical genealogical sources. Also see the list of children in the text.)

Elizabeth; FitzGerald	Luke; 1st Earl d. 1637	Susanna; Brabazon d. 1623	Charles; 1st Viscount; Muskerry d. 1641
Christopher; 2nd Earl d. 1649	Mabel; Barnewall	Donough; 1st Earl; Clancarty; 1594–1665	Eleanor; Butler; 1612–1682
Walter of Garryricken d. 1700	Mary; Plunket	Luke; 3rd Earl; 1639–1684	Margaret; MacCarthy d. 1704
Thomas of Garryricken d. 1738; Colonel	Margaret; Magennis; 1673–1744	Peter; 4th Earl; 1678–1718	Frances; Hales
John de jure 15th Earl; Ormond d. 1766	Justin; 5th Earl d. 1734

Legend

XXX	Subject of the article	XXX	Earls of Fingall	XXX	Viscounts Muskerry, & Earls of Clancarty	XXX	Earls of Ormond

== Early life ==
His father fought for the insurgents in the Irish Rebellion of 1641 and the Irish Confederate Wars. After the dissolution of the Irish Catholic Confederation in 1649, he continued his fight in the Royalist Alliance against the Parliamentarians during the Cromwellian Conquest. On 2 August 1649 his father fought under James Butler, 1st Duke of Ormond at the Battle of Rathmines for the Royalist alliance against the Parliamentarians. He was wounded and taken prisoner by the Parliamentarians. He died two weeks later of his wounds while in captivity at Dublin Castle.

Killeen succeeded his father as 3rd Earl of Fingall in August 1649 at the age of about ten. His father's estates were forfeited by the Parliamentarians.

== Marriage and children ==
Some time before 1666, Fingall married Margaret MacCarty, second daughter of Donough MacCarthy, 1st Earl of Clancarty and Eleanor Butler.

Luke and Margaret had three sons (of which the elder two died young and are not known by name):

1. Peter (1678–1718), his successor

—and three daughters:

1. Elizabeth, married to Rowland Eyre, Esq., of Hassop, Derbyshire, and of Estwell in Staffordshire
2. Helena, married first in 1681 to Sir FitzGerald Aylmer, Baronet, of Donadea in County Kildare and secondly to Michael Fleming, Esq., of Staholmog in County Meath
3. Amelia, married Theobald Taaffe, 4th Earl of Carlingford, the last earl of Carlingford

The marriage was a troubled one, giving constant anxiety to friends and family. The couple seem to have spent much time apart.

== Later life ==
In December 1661 Lord Fingall was one of the signatories of the Catholic Remonstrance and presented the document personally to James Butler, 1st Duke of Ormond, for submission to the king.

Litigation over the recovery of his estates before the Court of Claims dragged on for years, causing one of the commissioners for claims to remark that Lord Fingall's case "was suspended between Heaven and earth". He had recovered most of his estates by 1677. Though he had been politically prominent in the 1660s, he seems to have spent his later years in retirement. During the Popish Plot Lady Fingall, who was living apart from her husband in London, was named as a Catholic conspirator, but no action was taken against her.

== Death and timeline ==
Fingall died in 1684 and was succeeded by his eldest son Peter.

Timeline
Age	Date	Event
0	1639	Born
9–10	1649, 30 Jan	King Charles I beheaded.
9–10	1649, 2 Aug	Battle of Rathmines. Michael Jones defeats James Butler, Marquess of Ormond before Dublin.
9–10	1649, Aug	Succeeded his father as 3rd Earl of Fingall
20–21	1660, 29 May	Restoration of King Charles II
22–23	1662	Recovered his lands
38–39	1678	Peter, his third but only surviving son, born
45–46	1685, 6 Feb	Accession of King James II, succeeding King Charles II
44–45	1684	Died

== Notes and references ==
=== Sources ===
- Burke, Bernard; Burke, Ashworth Peter (1915). A Genealogical and Heraldic History of the Peerage and Baronetage, the Privy Council, Knightage and Companionage (77th ed.). London: Harrison. OCLC 1155471554.
- Cokayne, George Edward (1890). Complete Peerage of England, Scotland, Ireland, Great Britain and the United Kingdom, Extant, Extinct, or Dormant. Vol. III (1st ed.). London: George Bell and Sons. OCLC 1180838776. – D to F (for Fingall)
- Cokayne, George Edward (1895). Complete Peerage of England, Scotland, Ireland, Great Britain and the United Kingdom, Extant, Extinct, or Dormant. Vol. VI (1st ed.). London: George Bell and Sons. OCLC 1180818801. – N to R (for Ormond)
- Cokayne, George Edward (1926). Gibbs, Vicary (ed.). The complete peerage of England, Scotland, Ireland, Great Britain and the United Kingdom, extant, extinct, or dormant. Vol. V (2nd ed.). London: St Catherine Press. OCLC 228661424. – Eardley of Spalding to Goojerat (for Fingall)
- Creighton, Anne (October 2009). McGuire, James; Quinn, James (eds.). "Plunket, Luke". Dictionary of Irish Biography.
- Debrett, John (1828). Peerage of the United Kingdom of Great Britain and Ireland. Vol. II (17th ed.). London: F. C. and J. Rivington. OCLC 54499602. – Scotland and Ireland
- Duffy, Seán (2002). The Illustrated History of Ireland. New York: Contemporary Books. ISBN 0-8092-2437-2.
- Dunboyne, Patrick Theobald Tower Butler, Baron (1968). Butler Family History (2nd ed.). Kilkenny: Rothe House.
- Dunlop, Robert (1896). "Plunket, Christopher, second earl of Fingall (d. 1649)". In Lee, Sidney (ed.). Dictionary of National Biography. Vol. XLV. London: Smith, Elder, & Co. pp. 440–441. OCLC 8544105. – (for his father)
- Fryde, Edmund Boleslaw; Greenway, D. E.; Porter, S.; Roy, I., eds. (1986). Handbook of British Chronology. Royal Historical Society Guides and Handbooks, No. 2 (3rd ed.). London: Offices of the Royal Historical Society. ISBN 0-86193-106-8. – (for timeline)
- Hayes-McCoy, Gerard Anthony (1990) [1st pub. 1969]. Irish Battles: A Military History of Ireland. Belfast: The Appletree Press. ISBN 0-86281-250-X.
- Lodge, John (1789). Archdall, Mervyn (ed.). The Peerage of Ireland or, A Genealogical History of the Present Nobility of that Kingdom. Vol. VI. Dublin: James Moore. OCLC 264906028. – Viscounts, barons
- Mountmorres, Hervey Redmond Morres, Viscount (1792). The History of the Principal Transactions of the Irish Parliament from the Year 1634 to 1666. Vol. I. London: T. Cadell. OCLC 843863159. – House of Lords
- Ohlmeyer, Jane (2004). "Plunket, Christopher, second earl of Fingal". In Matthew, Colin; Harrison, Brian (eds.). Oxford Dictionary of National Biography. Vol. 44. New York: Oxford University Press. pp. 626–627. ISBN 0-19-861394-6.

Peerage of Ireland
Preceded by Christopher Plunket	Earl of Fingall; 1649–1684	Succeeded by Peter Plunket
