= General Herbert =

General Herbert may refer to:

- Arthur James Herbert (general) (1820–1897), British Army general
- George Herbert, 11th Earl of Pembroke (1759–1827), British Army general
- Henry Herbert, 10th Earl of Pembroke (1734–1794), British Army general
- Henry Herbert, 9th Earl of Pembroke (1693–1749), British Army lieutenant general
- Ivor Herbert, 1st Baron Treowen (1851–1933), British Army major general
- Otway Herbert (1901–1984), British Army lieutenant general
- Percy Egerton Herbert (1822–1876), British Army lieutenant general
- William Herbert (British Army officer, died 1757) (c. 1696–1757), British Army major general
- William Norman Herbert (1880–1949), British Army major general

== See also ==
- Attorney General Herbert (disambiguation)
