= Sáerlaith inion Elcomach =

Saerlaith inion Elcomach was an Irish centenarian who died in 969.

Saerlaith is recorded in the Annals of Ulster, sub anno 969, which states "Saerlaith, daughter of Elcomach, died aged one hundred."

== See also ==
- Katherine Plunket, 1820–1932.
- Dan Keating, 1902–2007.
