= Elizabeth Plunkett =

Elizabeth Plunkett may refer to:

- Elizabeth Gunning (translator), married name Elizabeth Plunkett, novelist and translator
- Elizabeth Plunket (died 1611), Countess of Fingall, of the Irish nobility
- Elizabeth Plunkett, 1976 victim of serial killers Geoffrey Evans and John Shaw in Ireland

== See also ==
- Elizabeth Burke-Plunkett (1862–1944), Irish activist and philanthropist
