= St Bride's Church, Llansantffraed =

The Church of St Bride (or St Bridget)
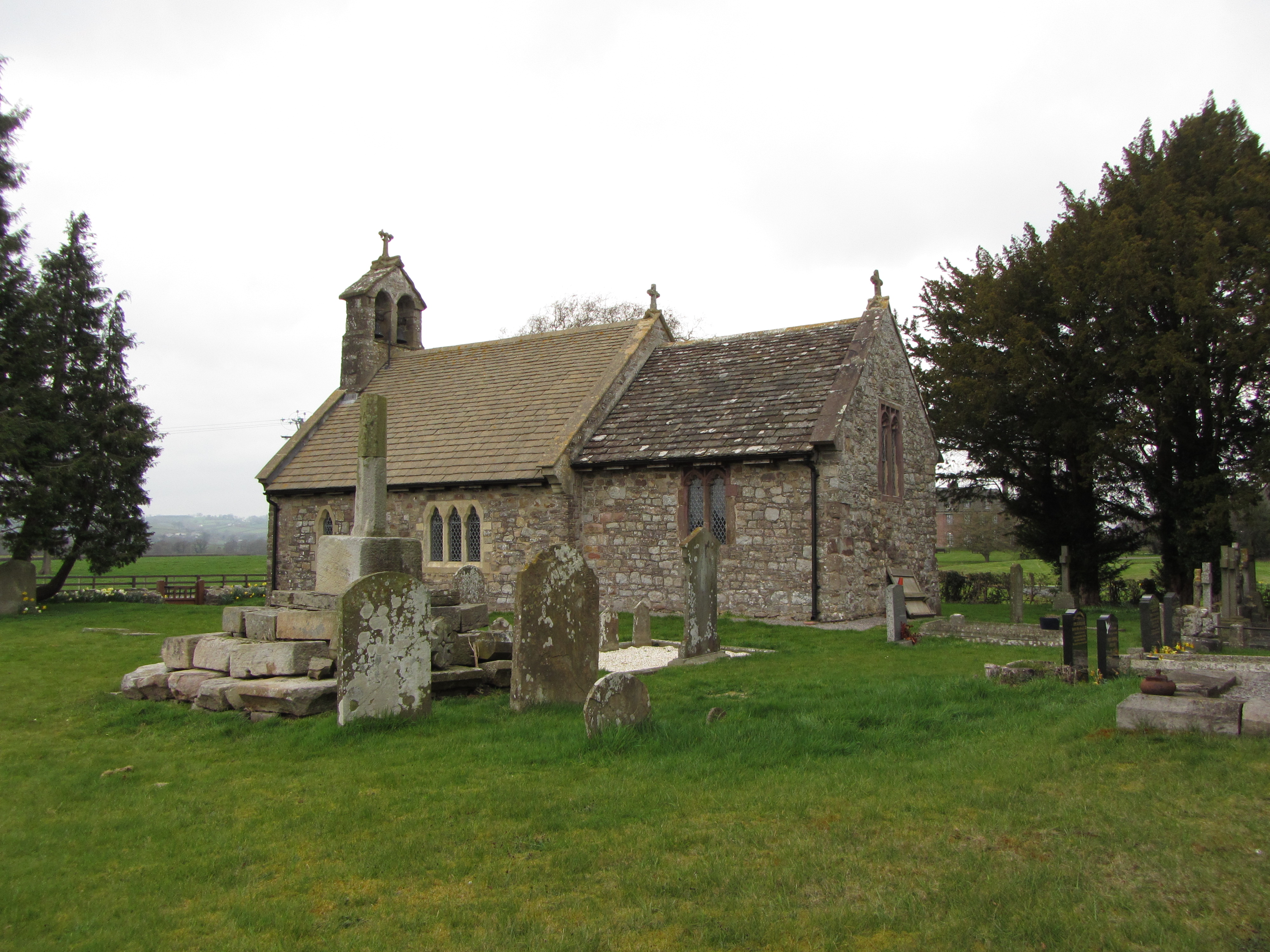

- Location in Monmouthshire
- 51.785°N 2.9332°W
- Location: Llansantffraed, Monmouthshire
- Country: Wales
- Denomination: Church in Wales

History
- Status: parish church
- Founded: 14th century

Architecture
- Functional status: Active
- Heritage designation: Grade II*
- Designated: 9 January 1956
- Architect(s): John Prichard & John Pollard Seddon
- Architectural type: Church
- Style: Norman

Administration
- Diocese: Monmouth
- Archdeaconry: Monmouth
- Deanery: Abergavenny
- Parish: Llanarth with Llansantffraed

Clergy
- Priest: The Reverend J Humphries

The Church of St Bride (or St Bridget) in Llansantffraed near Raglan, Monmouthshire, Wales, is a parish church of Norman origins. The church was restored by John Prichard and John Pollard Seddon in the 19th century but retains much of its earlier fabric. It is an active parish church in the parish of Llansantffraed, Monmouthshire's smallest parish, and is a Grade II* listed building.

== History ==
The church has Norman origins with a considerable amount of the fabric remaining. The building date for the bellcote is uncertain, but it post-dates the Norman building, and pre-dates the Victorian restoration. Pollard and Seddon worked at the church during 1856–1857, adding the porch in the process. Aside from re-roofing and general maintenance in the 1990s, it has been little altered since. It remains an active church in the parish of Llansantffraed, Monmouthshire's smallest parish. A late-medieval cross in the churchyard has its own Grade II listing.

== Architecture and description ==
The church is built of Old Red Sandstone. It is small, with an "oversize(d)" bellcote. The architectural historian John Newman notes the "unforgettable monuments", comprising a series of wall-mounted gravestones dating from the 17th century which record the ancestors of a William Jones, and run back to 1438.
