= Elizabeth Plunket =

Noblewoman in Elizabethan Ireland

Elizabeth FitzGerald (before 1597–1611) was the first wife of Lucas Plunket, who succeeded as Baron Killeen in 1613, and who in due course became the 1st Earl of Fingall in 1628. They lived at Killeen Castle, County Meath in Ireland. She was a daughter of Henry FitzGerald, 12th Earl of Kildare, and therefore sister to Bridget, the Countess of Tyrconnell and wife of Prince Rory O'Donnell, 1st Earl of Tyrconnell.

== Errors in her genealogy ==
Much confusion about her identity prevailed in erroneous genealogies during the 19th and early 20th centuries.

She was believed to be the daughter of Rory O'Donnell, 1st Earl of Tyrconnell, and Lady Bridget FitzGerald. Understood in the same way to have been Elizabeth O'Donnell, she was reported to have married Luke Plunket, 1st Earl of Fingall.

Her lineage as a daughter (possibly pre-marital) of Rory O'Donnell, 1st Earl of Tyrconnell, and his wife Lady Bridget FitzGerald, was repeatedly cited in various peerage directories, such as Lodge's (1827, and re-issued in 1907), Foster's (1881), Cokayne's (1926), and Burke's (1980).

== Corrected lineage ==
However, Elizabeth is clearly and more authoritatively identified as the second daughter of Henry FitzGerald, 12th Earl of Kildare and Lady Frances Howard, and was, therefore, the sister of Rory's wife, Lady Bridget née FitzGerald, properly recorded in the histories of the FitzGeralds of Kildare, based on their own family archives in Carton House and Kilkea Castle, and on no better authority than Charles FitzGerald, 4th Duke of Leinster himself, writing at the time as Marquis of Kildare (and before the later erroneous authors), and who confirmed that Elizabeth married Luke Plunket, 1st Earl of Fingall in 1608. Later sources confirmed this, i.e. that this Elizabeth was a FitzGerald, the Countess Lady Bridget's sister, and not her daughter. Elizabeth is said to have died in London in 1611 during an outbreak of the plague only three years after her marriage.

Lord Killeen, later Earl of Fingall, was also married on three other occasions. He had married in 1628 Eleanor Bagenal, who died leaving no children. His son by a later marriage to Susanna Brabazon, Christopher Plunket, 2nd Earl of Fingall, married Mabel Barnewall, niece of Elizabeth through her sister, Bridget, whose second husband was Nicholas Barnewall, 1st Viscount Kingsland, from whom she had more children. Another niece, Mary Barnewall married Nicholas Preston, 6th Viscount Gormanston. Lucas Plunket's last wife was Margaret St. Lawrence, daughter of Nicholas St Lawrence, 9th Baron Howth. Plunket died on 29 March 1637; Margaret died the following November.
