= Arthur James Herbert (general) =

British Army general

General Sir Arthur Herbert KCB
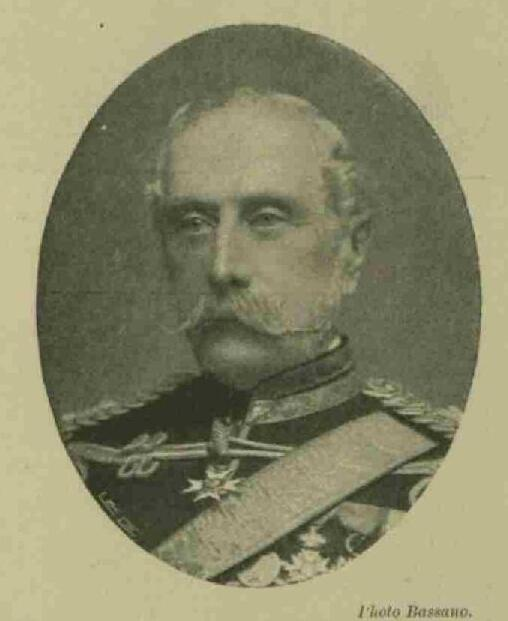
- Born: Arthur James Jones; 21 January 1820; Llansantffraed, Monmouthshire, Wales
- Died: 24 November 1897 (aged 77); Kensington, London
- Military career
- Allegiance: United Kingdom
- Branch: British Army
- Service years: 1839–1887
- Rank: General
- Unit: Royal Welsh Fusiliers
- Conflicts: Crimean War
- Awards: Knight Commander of the Order of the Bath

General Sir Arthur James Herbert KCB (21 January 1820 – 24 November 1897) was a Welsh officer in the British Army who was Quartermaster-General to the Forces.

== Early life and education ==
Herbert was born in Llansantffraed, Monmouthshire, the second son of James A. Jones of Llanarth, Monmouthshire, and Lady Harriet Plunkett, daughter of Arthur Plunkett, 8th Earl of Fingall, a prominent Irish Roman Catholic peer. He was educated at Prior Park Roman Catholic College and Christ Church, Oxford, earning a B.A. in 1877 and M.A. in 1882.

Along with other members of his family, he changed his surname to Herbert in 1848.

== Military career ==
Herbert was commissioned into the 23rd Regiment of Foot, also known as the Royal Welsh Fusiliers, in 1839.

He rose through the officer ranks becoming a Major in 1854. He served in the Crimean War and made sketches of the action.

In 1856 he was appointed Deputy Quartermaster-General in the Ionian Islands before becoming Assistant Adjutant-General at Headquarters.

He was appointed Quartermaster-General to the Forces in 1882 and retired in 1887.

== Personal life ==
In Southampton in 1854, Herbert married Elizabeth Hill Ferguson, the daughter of Charles John Hill and widow of Captain George Ferguson, of Houghton Hall, Carlisle, Cumberland.

He died at his home after a long illness.

Military offices
Preceded by Sir Garnet Wolseley	Quartermaster-General to the Forces; 1882–1887	Succeeded by Sir Redvers Buller
