= Frederica Plunket =

Irish aristocrat and botanical illustrator

The Honourable Frederica Louise Edith Plunket

Personal details
- Born: 1838 Ireland
- Died: 1886 (aged 47–48)
- Parent(s): Thomas Plunket, 2nd Baron Plunket; Louise Jane Foster

The Honourable Frederica Louisa Edith Plunket (1838–1886) was an Irish aristocrat from Ballymascanlan, County Louth, a prolific botanical illustrator and pioneering mountaineer.

== Family ==
Plunket was born at Kilsaran, near Castlebellingham in County Louth. Her father Thomas Plunket, 2nd Baron Plunket (1792–1866), was a junior Church of Ireland clergyman and later became the Bishop of Tuam, Killala and Achonry. Her mother Louise Jane Foster (married in 1819) was the daughter of John William Foster of Fanevalley, County Louth, Member of Parliament for Dunleer, and was related to the Earl of Clermont. Her grandfather was William Plunket, 1st Baron Plunket, Lord Chancellor of Ireland. Her first and second cousins included three titled members of the Irish aristocracy. Her eldest sister Katherine Plunket was known as Ireland's oldest person at 111 years and 327 days.

== Botanical illustration ==
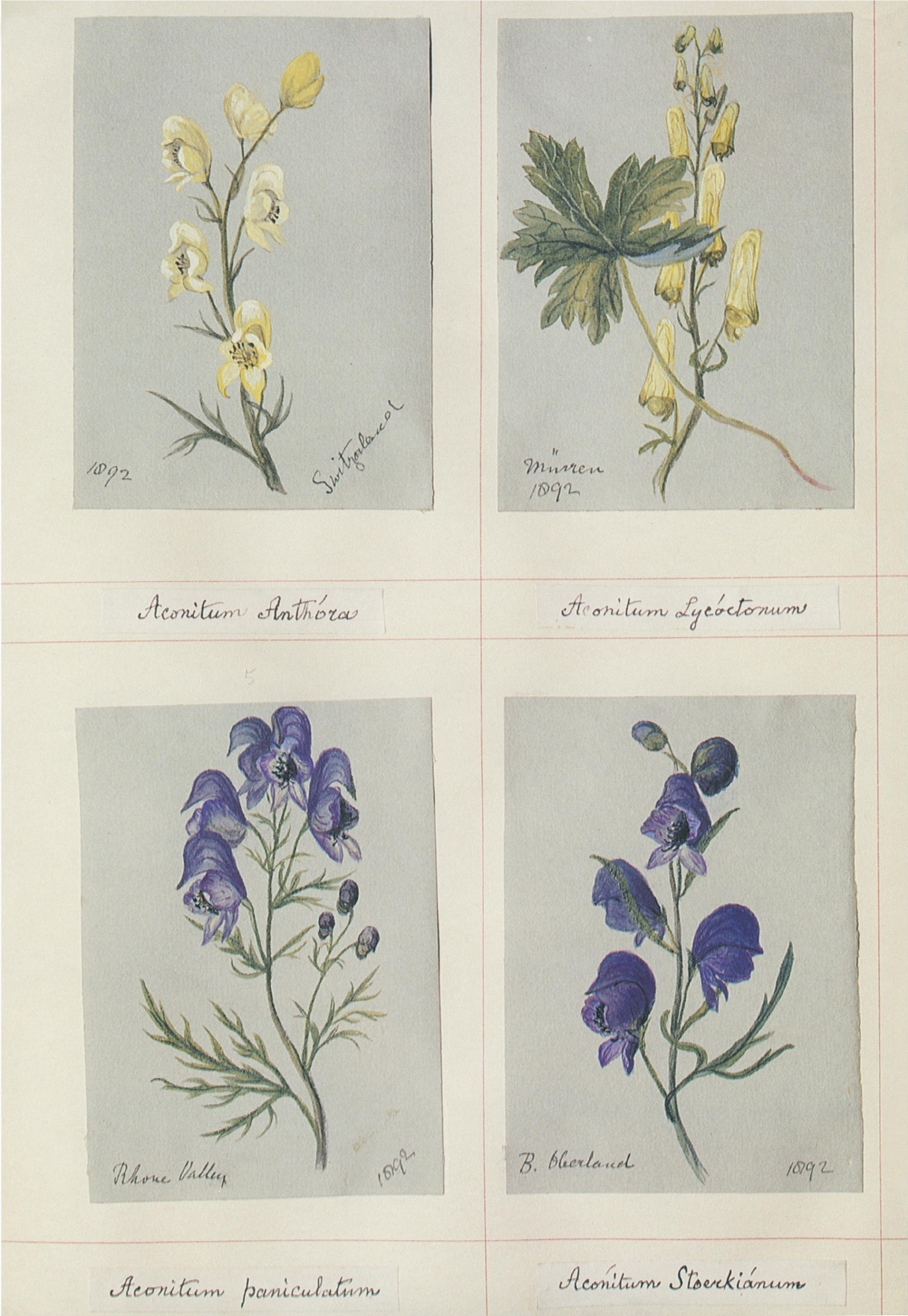
Illustrations of Aconitum from Wild Flowers from Nature

Plunket travelled Europe with her sister Katherine Plunket and they made many sketches of flowers in France, Italy, Spain and Germany, and Ireland. These were bound in a volume, Wild Flowers from Nature, which was presented in 1903 to the Royal College of Science, and was later transferred to the Museum of Science and Art in the National Museum of Ireland. In 1970 it was part of the collections which were transferred to the Irish National Botanic Gardens at Glasnevin.

== Mountaineering ==
Plunket wrote a book about her mountaineering and experiences travelling the Alps in the 1870s. Here and there among the Alps, published 1875. The book was expressly written for women interested in mountaineering and to show them what was possible for the active healthy woman. It was a rejection of the notion that mountaineering was always a dangerous impossible challenge for women, despite a belief that women were somewhat physically inferior. In fact she encouraged women to pass boundaries. The book describes ascents of multiple peaks in Switzerland undertaken in 1874 although the introduction indicates that this is only one of several years of climbing.

Despite her insistence in the introduction to her book that dangers were over emphasised Plunket herself experienced potentially fatal accidents while climbing.

Although now reported it was Lucy Walker who first succeeded in reaching the top, Anne Rathdonnell, The 1st Lady Rathdonnell wrote in her diary in 1879, that Plunket was known as the first woman to the top of the Matterhorn:"I remember meeting several times in Chester Square the Hon. Frederica Plunket, famous then as the first woman to climb the Matterhorn"
