= Arthur Plunkett, 8th Earl of Fingall =

Irish peer (1759-1835)

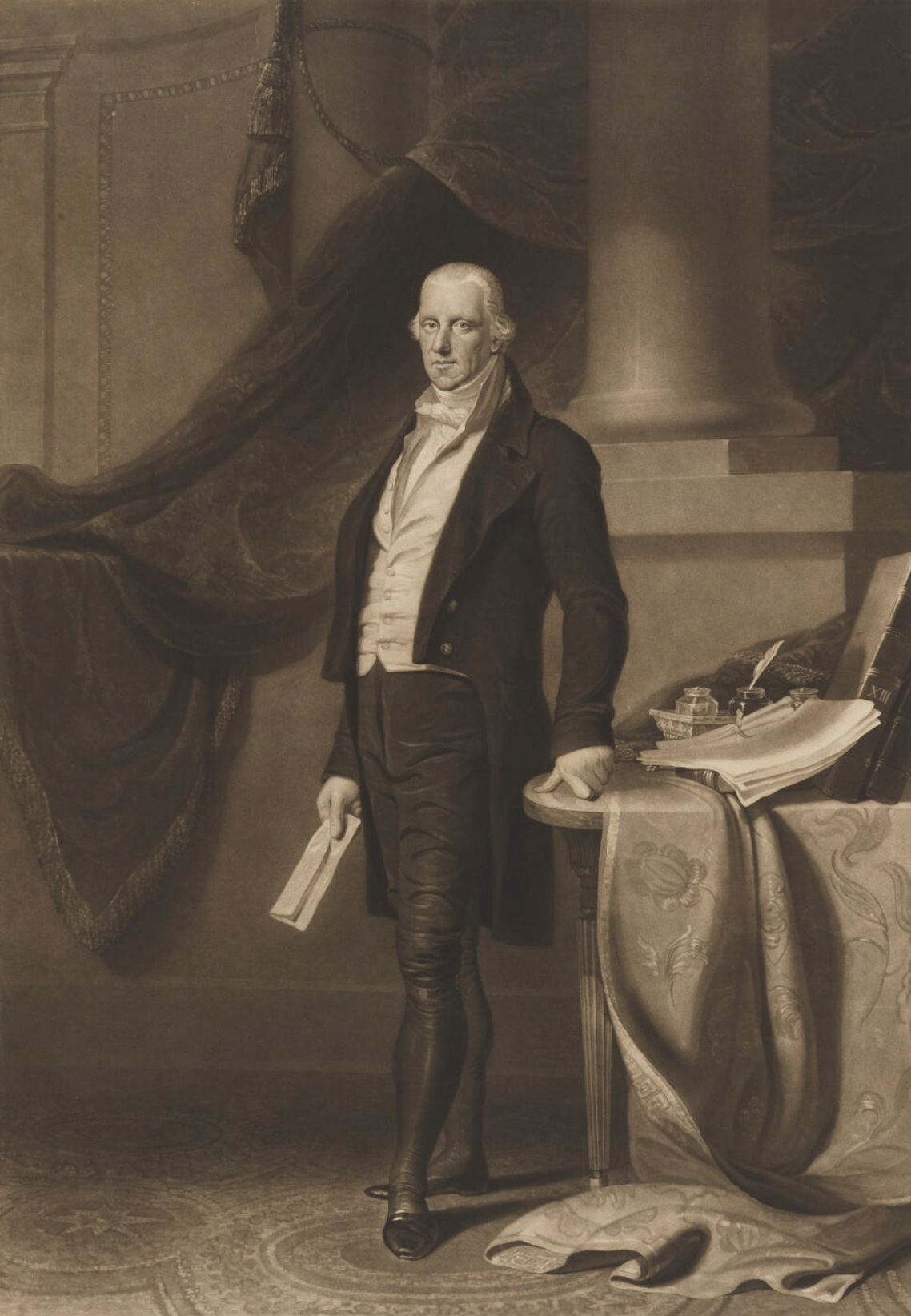
Engraving by Charles Turner, after Thomas Clement Thompson

Arthur James Plunkett, 8th Earl of Fingall KP (9 September 1759 – 30 July 1835), styled Lord Killeen until 1793, was an Irish peer. A prominent Roman Catholic, he was a leading supporter of the cause of Catholic emancipation. He was at the same time a loyalist who played a leading role in suppressing the Rebellion of 1798.

== Family ==
He was the eldest son of Arthur James Plunkett, 7th Earl of Fingall and his wife Henrietta Wollascot, daughter and heiress of William Wollascot of Woolhampton, Berkshire. He became Earl of Fingall in 1793 upon the death of his father.

He married in 1785 Frances Donelan, daughter of John Donelan of Ballydonnellan, County Galway and his wife Mabel Hore, daughter of Matthew Hore of Shandon, County Waterford; she died in 1835. They had a son, Arthur Plunkett, 9th Earl of Fingall, and a daughter, Harriet (died 1871), who married James Jones of Llanarth, Monmouthshire, and was the mother of Sir Arthur James Herbert.

Fingall was appointed a Knight of the Order of St Patrick on 20 October 1821, on the occasion of the Royal Visit to Ireland of King George IV. His creation as Baron Fingall, of Woolhampton Lodge in the County of Berkshire on 20 June 1831 made him a member of the United Kingdom House of Lords.

== Cause of Catholic emancipation ==
For many years he was a champion of the cause of Catholic emancipation, and for a time worked closely with Daniel O'Connell to secure it. In 1807 he obtained an interview with the 1st Duke of Wellington, the Chief Secretary for Ireland, who explained that Catholic emancipation was not at that time practical politics, but that the remaining Penal Laws would be enforced with all possible mildness and good humour. As one of the leaders of the Catholic Association in its original form, which the Government maintained was illegal, he was briefly arrested, but never prosecuted. His role led to his being known by the unofficial title "head of the Irish Catholic laity". In 1815 he withdrew from any active role in the Emancipation movement, following a series of bitter public clashes with Daniel O'Connell. O'Connell publicly denounced Fingall as "a Catholic nobleman coldly departed from the cause of his children and his country". This, however, was the kind of rhetoric in which O'Connell frequently engaged in public, and was rarely a guide to his true feelings. In private he admitted to having great regard for Fingall, whom he described as having a character "as pure as gold".

Lord Byron violently attacked Fingall in verse for accepting the Order of St. Patrick from George IV - wears Fingall thy trappings? - and for his deferential behaviour during the Royal Visit in 1821. However Fingall and his fellow Irish Catholic peers were not, and did not pretend to be, republicans: they sought equal rights under the Crown, not separation from it. Fingall himself had demonstrated his loyalty to the Crown during the 1798 Rebellion.

Peerage of Ireland
Preceded by Arthur Plunkett	Earl of Fingall; 1797–1836	Succeeded by Arthur Plunkett
Peerage of the United Kingdom
New creation	Baron Fingall; 1831–1836	Succeeded by Arthur Plunkett
