= Patrick Plunket, 7th Baron Plunket =

Equerry to Queen Elizabeth II of England (1923–1975)

Lieutenant-Colonel The Right Honourable The Lord Plunket KCVO
- Born: 8 September 1923
- Died: 28 May 1975 (aged 51)
- Burial place: Royal Burial Ground, Frogmore
- Relatives: Terence Plunket, 6th Baron Plunket (father); Dorothée Lewis (mother)
- Military career
- Allegiance: United Kingdom
- Branch: British Army
- Rank: Lieutenant-Colonel
- Unit: Irish Guards
- Conflicts: World War II

Patrick Terence William Span Plunket, 7th Baron Plunket, KCVO (8 September 1923 – 28 May 1975), was an Anglo-Irish aristocrat and British Army officer who served as an equerry to Queen Elizabeth II and Deputy Master of the Household from 1954 until his death in 1975.

== Early life ==
Plunket was born on 8 September 1923 into an old Anglo-Irish aristocratic family. He was the eldest son of the 6th Baron Plunket and Dorothé Mabel Lewis (1900–1938). His mother was the illegitimate daughter of the 7th Marquess of Londonderry and actress Fannie Ward. He was a childhood friend of the future Queen Elizabeth II.

When he was 14, his parents were killed in an air crash in California in 1938. Plunket succeeded to the family peerage (created in 1827) as 7th Baron Plunket. He and his brothers were raised by their aunt, the Hon. Helen Rhodes, and her husband. He was educated at Eton College and the University of Cambridge. Later, he served as an officer in the Irish Guards during World War II with the rank of captain.

== Career ==
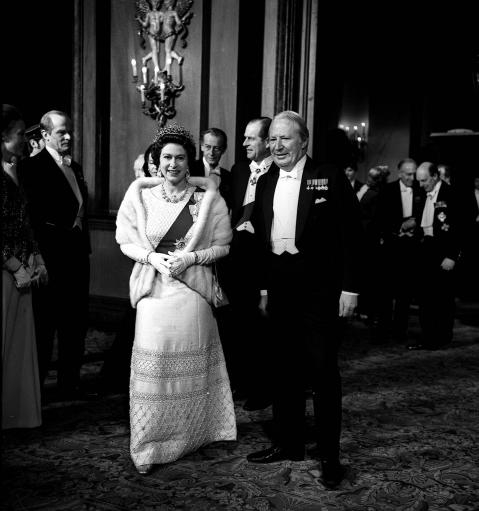
Queen Elizabeth II (escorted by Edward Heath) wearing Plunket's family tiara, 3 January 1973

In March 1948, Plunket was appointed temporary equerry to King George VI. He was appointed equerry to the new Queen Elizabeth II shortly after her accession in August 1952. On 4 May 1954, he was appointed Deputy Master of the Household, a post he held until his death.

He enjoyed a close friendship with Queen Elizabeth II, he has been described 'the nearest thing to a brother to the Queen'. In 1961, he became godfather to Princess Margaret's son Viscount Linley. On 8 September 1957, he was promoted to the rank of major and later to the rank of lieutenant-colonel on 8 April 1969. On 3 January 1973, Plunket lent his family tiara to the Queen when hers broke en route to the “Fanfare for Europe” gala at the Royal Opera House in Covent Garden.

Plunket was a trustee of the Wallace Collection and the National Art Collection Fund.

== Death ==
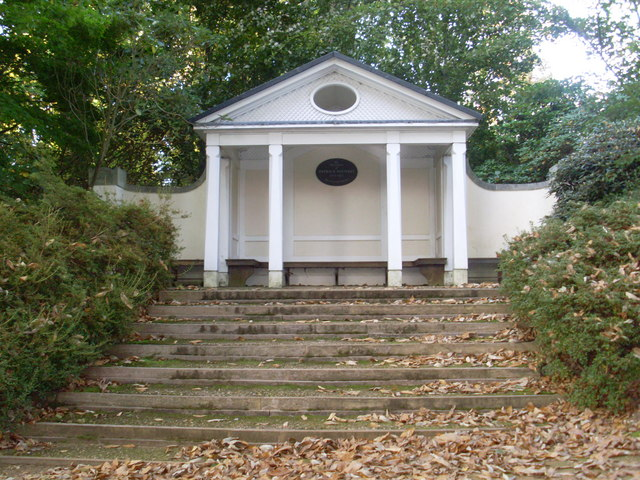
Memorial pavilion at Valley Gardens

Unmarried, Plunket died of cancer on 28 May 1975 at the age of 51. The Queen unusually attended both his funeral at the Chapel Royal, St James's Palace and his memorial service at the Guards' Chapel. He is buried in the Royal Burial Ground at Frogmore, the royal family's private graveyard in the Home Park near Windsor Castle. Lord Plunket is the only person buried at the Royal Burial Ground who is not related through blood or marriage to the royal family.

The Queen had a memorial built for him in Valley Gardens, Windsor Great Park. His estate was valued at £471,004. Upon his death, his younger brother Robin Rathmore Plunket succeeded him as the 8th Baron Plunket.

== In popular culture ==
Plunket was portrayed by Sam Crane in "Dear Mrs Kennedy", the eighth episode of the second series of the Netflix original historical drama The Crown.

== Honours and arms ==
=== Honours ===
- 1 January 1955: Member, 4th Class, of the Royal Victorian Order (MVO)
- 8 June 1963: Commander of the Royal Victorian Order (CVO)
- 1 January 1974: Knight Commander of the Royal Victorian Order (KCVO)

=== Arms ===
Coat of arms of Patrick Plunket, 7th Baron Plunket
Crest A horse passant Argent charged on the shoulder with a portcullis. Escutcheon Sable a bend a castle in chief and a portcullis in base Argent. Supporters Dexter an antelope Proper sinister a horse Argent both charged on the shoulder with a portcullis Sable. Motto Festina Lente

Peerage of the United Kingdom
Preceded by Terence Plunket	Baron Plunket; 1938–1975	Succeeded by Robin Plunket
