= Robin Plunket, 8th Baron Plunket =

British officer; hereditary peer (1925–2013)

Captain Robin Rathmore Plunket, 8th Baron Plunket (3 December 1925 – 16 November 2013), was a descendant of prominent Irish lawyer and Whig politician William Conyngham Plunket for whom the Peerage of the United Kingdom (not of Ireland) was created in 1827.

Plunket was christened on 1 February 1926 at St Saviour's Church, Walton Street, London. His godmother was his parents' friend, the Duchess of York (later Queen Elizabeth The Queen Mother), who was represented on this occasion by Mabell Ogilvy, Countess of Airlie. He was the second son of Terence Conyngham Plunket, 6th Baron Plunket of Newton and his wife, the former Dorothé Mabel Lewis. Lord and Lady Plunket were killed in an aircraft crash in 1938, and their three sons (Robin Rathmore Plunket, Patrick Terence William Span Plunket, and Shaun Albert Frederick Sheridan Plunket) were brought up by their father's sister, the Hon. Helen Rhodes.

== Education ==
Robin Rathmore Plunket was educated at Eton College and served in the Army.

== Personal life ==
He married Jennifer Southwell, daughter of Bailey Southwell and his wife, the former Erica Alberta Barry, on 8 November 1951. The Plunkets, who did not have children, lived in London. Lady Plunket died in 2018.

Robin Rathmore Plunket became 8th Baron in 1975 on the death of his elder brother. He sat in the House of Lords on various occasions.

== Legacy ==
On his death, the title passed to his nephew, Tyrone Shaun Terence Plunket (b. 1966), only son of Lord Plunket's youngest brother, the Hon. Shaun Albert Frederick Sheridan Plunket (1931—2012).

Coat of arms of Robin Plunket, 8th Baron Plunket
Crest A horse passant Argent charged on the shoulder with a portcullis. Escutcheon Sable a bend a castle in chief and a portcullis in base Argent. Supporters Dexter an antelope Proper sinister a horse Argent both charged on the shoulder with a portcullis Sable. Motto Festina Lente

== See also ==
- List of hereditary Baronies in the Peerage of the United Kingdom

Peerage of the United Kingdom
Preceded by Patrick Plunket	Baron Plunket; 1975—2013	Succeeded by Tyrone Shaun Terence Plunket
