= List of Irish supercentenarians =

People from Ireland who have attained or surpassed the age of 110 years

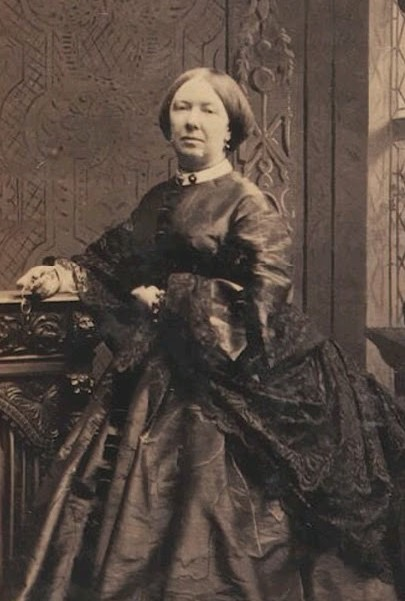
Katherine Plunket (22 November 1820 – 14 October 1932)

This list includes Irish supercentenarians (people from Ireland who have attained the age of at least 110 years) whose lifespans have been verified by an international body that specifically deals in longevity research, such as the Gerontology Research Group (GRG). There have been, including emigrants, 15 verified supercentenarians from Ireland. The oldest person ever to die in Ireland was Katherine Plunket at 111 years, 327 days. The oldest ever person born in Ireland was Kathleen Snavely, who died aged 113 years, 140 days in the United States. All Irish supercentenarians were born at a time when the island of Ireland was part of the United Kingdom.

== Irish supercentenarians ==
Below is a list of the oldest people who were born on the island of Ireland.

Deceased Living

| Rank | Name | Sex | Birth date | Death date | Age | Birth county | Place of death or residence |
|---|---|---|---|---|---|---|---|
| 1 | Kathleen Snavely | F | 16 February 1902 | 6 July 2015 | 113 years, 140 days | Clare | United States |
| 2 | Annie Scott | F | 15 March 1883 | 21 April 1996 | 113 years, 37 days | Tyrone (Note: Scott, Irwin, Webster, Reed, Donaldson, MacNeil, Watkins, Green, Hanna and Nicholl were born in Northern Ireland, then part of the United Kingdom of Great Britain and Ireland, now part of the United Kingdom of Great Britain and Northern Ireland.) | Scotland |
| 3 | Henrietta Irwin | F | 27 May 1906 | 15 January 2019 | 112 years, 233 days | Antrim | Canada |
| 4 | Katherine Plunket | F | 22 November 1820 | 14 October 1932 | 111 years, 327 days | Louth | Louth |
| 5 | Elizabeth Munson | F | 6 May 1872 | 2 February 1984 | 111 years, 272 days | Dublin | Dublin |
| 6 | Margaret Hegarty | F | 2 April 1880 | 14 November 1991 | 111 years, 226 days | Cork | United States |
| 7 | Jane Webster | F | 17 April 1906 | 31 October 2017 | 111 years, 197 days | Antrim | England |
| 8 | Margaret Dolan | F | 30 August 1893 | 2 December 2004 | 111 years, 94 days | Galway | Galway |
| 9 | Margaret Reed | F | 20 April 1910 | 8 July 2021 | 111 years, 79 days | Armagh | England |
| 10 | Sarah Donaldson | F | 20 August 1908 | 25 October 2019 | 111 years, 66 days | Down | United States |
| 11 | Ruth MacNeil | F | 19 October 1914 | 7 December 2025 | 111 years, 49 days | Antrim | United States |
| 12 | Florence Lyle | F | 16 January 1887 | 11 January 1998 | 110 years, 360 days | England | Antrim |
| 13 | Margaret Linehan | F | 27 April 1892 | 18 February 2003 | 110 years, 297 days | Cork | United States |
| 14 | Catherine Furey | F | 6 April 1893 | 30 November 2003 | 110 years, 238 days | Roscommon | United States |
| 15 | Elizabeth Watkins | F | 10 March 1863 | 21 October 1973 | 110 years, 225 days | Antrim | Antrim |
| 16 | Ellen Green | F | 19 July 1878 | 4 December 1988 | 110 years, 138 days | Antrim | Canada |
| 17 | Catherine Hedges | F | 8 July 1916 | Living | 110 years, 134 days | Limerick | England |
| 18 | Elizabeth Yensen | F | 25 July 1895 | 4 December 2005 | 110 years, 132 days | Scotland | Down |
| 19 | Elizabeth Hanna | F | 4 April 1907 | 16 July 2017 | 110 years, 103 days | Antrim | Canada |
| 20 | Mary Ellen Geaney | F | 2 January 1886 | 5 April 1996 | 110 years, 94 days | Cork | Cork |
| 21 | Maud Nicholl | F | 3 July 1909 | 19 September 2019 | 110 years, 78 days | Antrim | Antrim |
| 22 | Margaret Bly | F | 28 June 1894 | 4 August 2004 | 110 years, 37 days | Donegal | United States |
| 23 | Annie O'Donnell | F | 20 June 1894 | 5 July 2004 | 110 years, 15 days | Donegal | United States |
| 24 | Mary Walsh | F | 9 April 1908 | 12 April 2018 | 110 years, 3 days | Mayo | United States |
