= Katherine Plunket =

Anglo-Irish aristocrat and botanical illustrator

The Honourable Katherine Plunket
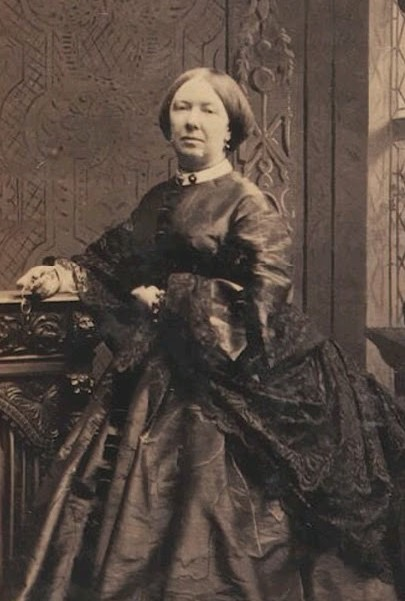
- Born: Catherine Plunket; 22 November 1820; Kilsaran, County Louth, Ireland
- Died: 14 October 1932 (aged 111 years, 327 days); Ballymascanlan, County Louth, Ireland
- Occupations: Artist (Painter and illustrator)
- Known for: Member of the aristocracy Oldest person ever to be born and die in Ireland
- Parent(s): Thomas Plunket, 2nd Baron Plunket and Louise Jane Foster
- Family: William Plunket, 1st Baron Plunket (grandfather); Frederica Plunket (sister)

Katherine Plunket (born Catherine Plunket; 22 November 1820 – 14 October 1932) was an Anglo-Irish aristocrat and amateur artist from Ballymascanlan, County Louth. She holds the distinction of being the oldest person ever to be born and die in Ireland, living to the age of 111 years and 327 days. She is also the fourth longest-lived Irish person in recorded history.

== Biography ==
Plunket was born on 22 November 1820, at Kilsaran, near Castlebellingham in County Louth, Ireland (then part of the United Kingdom). The eldest of six children, one of whom died in infancy, she was a granddaughter of William Plunket, 1st Baron Plunket, Lord High Chancellor of Ireland. Her father Thomas Plunket, 2nd Baron Plunket (1792–1866), was a junior Church of Ireland clergyman when she was born and later became the Bishop of Tuam, Killala and Achonry, she was referenced in numerous peerage books of the period including Whittakers Peerage.

Her mother, Louisa Jane Foster (22 November 1794 – 14 January 1893) (married on 26 October 1819, Kilsaren), was the second daughter of Rebecca M'Clure and John William Foster of Fanevalley, County Louth, Member of Parliament for Dunleer, and was related to the Earl of Clermont. Her first and second cousins included three titled members of the Irish aristocracy. She was baptised Anglican in Kilsaran Church on 13 December 1820 as Catherine Plunket, though she spelt her name with a "K" for her entire life.

She inherited from her mother one of the family's ancestral homes, Ballymascanlon House near Dundalk, and oversaw the upkeep of the home and gardens until she contracted bronchitis aged 102 (her only serious health problem). The house is now a hotel.

== Botanical illustration ==
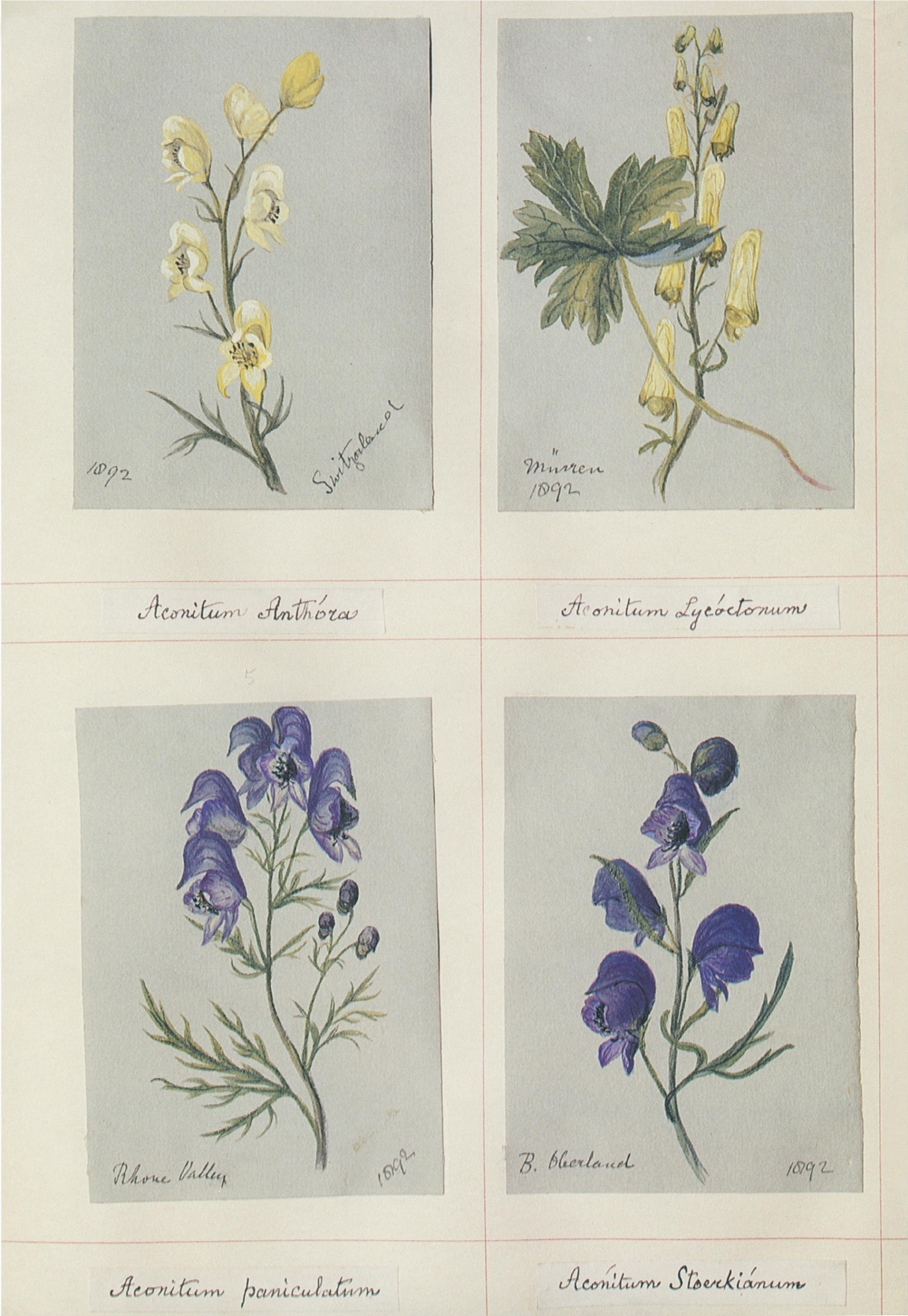
Illustrations of Aconitum from Wild Flowers from Nature

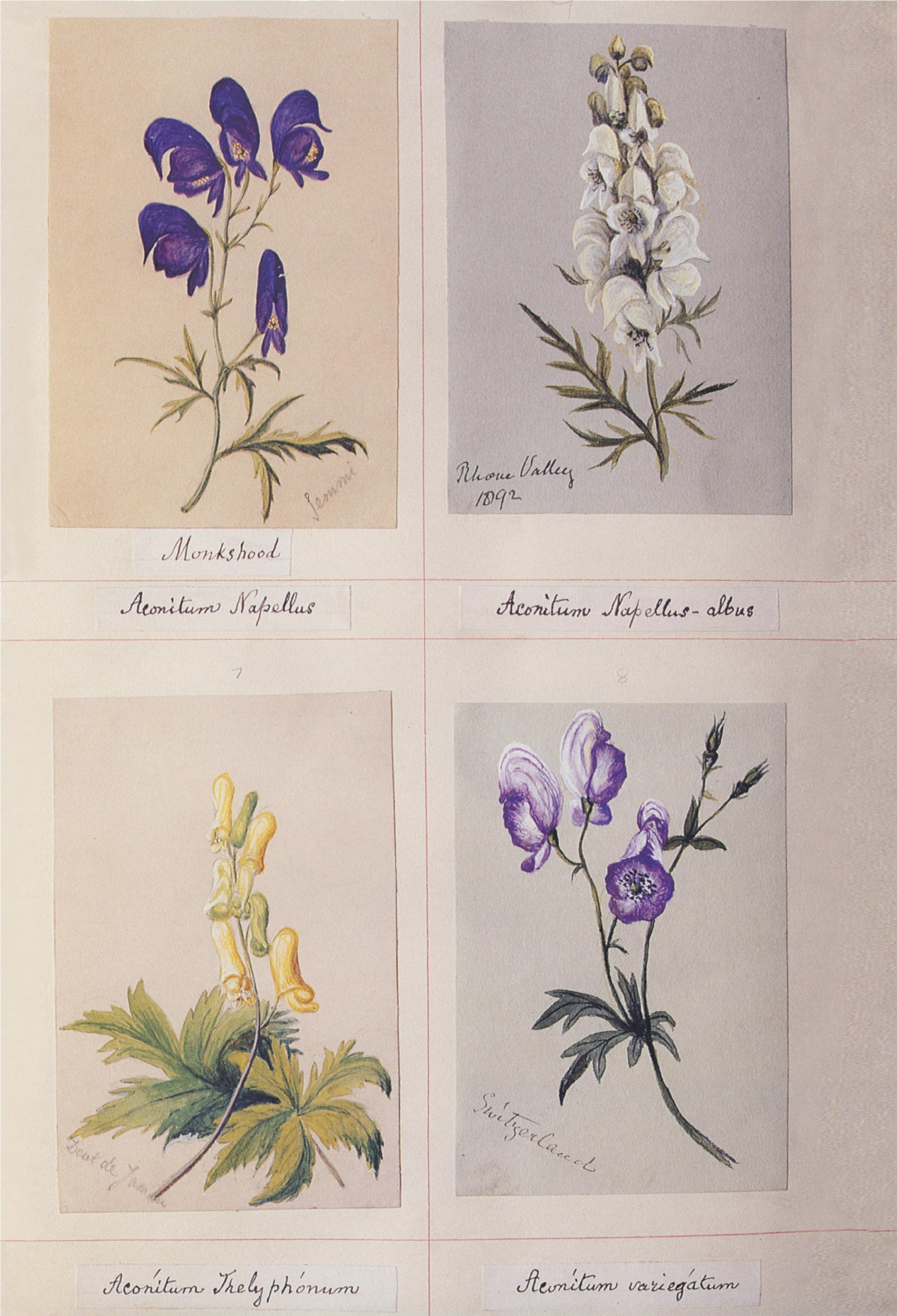

With her younger sister Gertrude (1841–1924), Plunket travelled widely and visited almost every capital in Europe. With her sister, Frederica, she made many sketches of flowers in France, Italy, Spain and Germany, and Ireland.

These were bound in a volume named Wild Flowers from Nature which was presented in 1903 to the Royal College of Science, and was later transferred to the Museum of Science and Art in the National Museum of Ireland. In 1970 it was part of the collections which were transferred to the Irish National Botanic Gardens at Glasnevin.

== Longevity record ==
Plunket was retrospectively recognised as having been the world's oldest living person after the death of Delina Filkins on 4 December 1928, when she was aged 108 years and 12 days. At the time of Plunket's death, she was credited with being the longest-lived Irish person in history, and not only lived longer than anyone who died in the Irish Free State, but also the United Kingdom. Aged 109, she received a telegram from King George V. Her age was not surpassed by a citizen of the United Kingdom until 1970, when Ada Giddings Roe lived to be 12 days older. She was the last living person who had met the author Sir Walter Scott (1771–1832), when he stayed at her grandfather's house in Bray while she was visiting.

Plunket was included in the first-ever Guinness World Records (published in 1955), and is the only supercentenarian listed then to stand the burden of scrutiny in the years since.

Plunket attributed her longevity to the unrustled carefree aspect of her life. She died on 14 October 1932, a month shy of her 112th birthday; her death was recorded three days later in Ravensdale, County Louth and attributed to syncope. Her obituary was published in numerous Irish media publications, and in England in The Times. A telegram of condolence was sent to her relatives by King George V.

== See also ==
- List of the oldest people by country
- Oldest people
- List of British supercentenarians
