= Llansantffraed, Monmouthshire =

Coordinates: 51.7849°N 2.9331°W

Llansantffraed
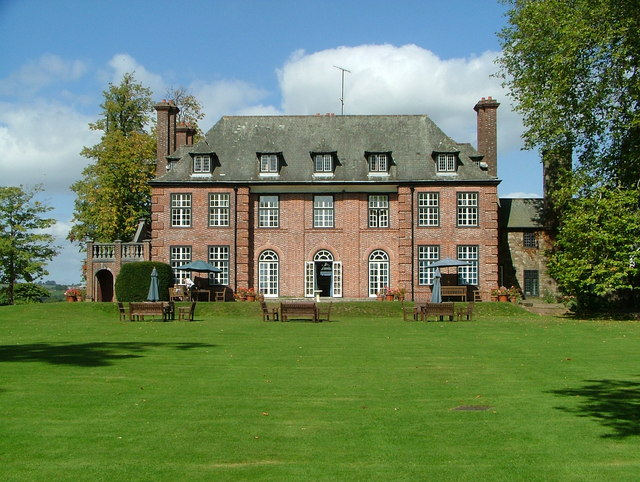
- Llansantffraed Court

- Location within Monmouthshire
- OS grid reference: SO356101
- Community: Llanvihangel Gobion
- Principal area: Monmouthshire
- Preserved county: Gwent
- Country: Wales
- Sovereign state: United Kingdom
- Post town: Abergavenny
- Dialling code: 01873
- Police: Gwent
- Fire: South Wales
- Ambulance: Welsh
- UK Parliament: Monmouth
- Website: http://www.llansantffraed.co.uk/

Llansantffraed is the smallest parish in Monmouthshire, Wales, located four miles to the west of Raglan, north of the A40 between Raglan and Abergavenny. There is no community, only the Llansantffraed Court estate and the church.

== History ==
Llansantffraed is the smallest parish in Monmouthshire, covering only 290 acres. It is notable for its church, St Bride's (or St Bridget's), which is a Grade II* listed building, and Llansantffraed Court, the house which forms part of the Llansantffraed Estate. The house was registered as a Grade II listed building in 2005.

The court was designed by Fairfax Blomfield Wade-Palmer and C. Frankis in 1912 for a member of the Herbert family, major landowners in the county. Cadw suggests Edwin Lutyens' Monkton House in Sussex as their inspiration. The Royal Commission on the Ancient and Historical Monuments of Wales describes the architecture of the court as "a Home Counties style unusual to Wales". Joseph Bradney, writing in his multi-volume A History of Monmouthshire from the Coming of the Normans into Wales down to the Present Time, noted the house as presenting "no particular signs of antiquity, but distinguished by its fine situation". Bradney also recorded the owner at the time of writing (1906) as being Major Edward Herbert, chief constable of Monmouthshire, and that previous residents had included two Bishops of Llandaff, William Van Mildert and Edward Copleston. The grounds have an ornamental lake and fountain. Llansantffraed Court operated as a hotel from mid 20th century until November 2019 when it was converted back to a private residence.

== The Church of St Bride's ==
The Church of St Bride's (or St Bridget's) is situated in the grounds of Llansantffraed Court. Restored in 1858, it consists of a chancel, nave, south porch and a western turret containing 2 bells. There are memorials in the chancel to the ancestors of the Jones and Herbert families: there are 55 sittings. In the churchyard is an ancient stone cross. The register dates from the year 1753.
