= Terence Plunket, 6th Baron Plunket =

British aristocrat (1899–1938)

Terence Conyngham Plunket, 6th Baron Plunket (12 July 1899 – 24 February 1938), was the son of The 5th Baron Plunket and Lady Victoria Alexandrina Hamilton-Temple-Blackwood.

He became the 6th Baron Plunket, of Newtown in the County of Cork, on the death of his father on 24 January 1920.

On 4 December 1922, he married Dorothée Mabel Barnato (née Lewis), widow of Captain Jack Barnato and the illegitimate daughter of actress Fannie Ward and The 7th Marquess of Londonderry.

The Plunkets died in 1938 in a plane crash in California. After planning a stay of several weeks in California, they arrived in Hollywood around 11 February 1938. They had rented the mansion of former screen comedian William Haines. As guests of publicist William Randolph Hearst, Lord Plunket, his wife and their travelling companion, James Lawrence, a son of Sir Walter Lawrence of London, boarded a plane owned by Hearst's San Francisco and Los Angeles newspapers. They were bound for the Hearst ranch at San Simeon, now known as Hearst Castle. In the coastal fog surrounding the airstrip on the ranch, the pilot overshot the field by nearly a mile and a half. One wing struck the ground, causing the plane to burst into flames and crash. James Lawrence was the only survivor, having been thrown clear of the plane. He suffered burns and a broken ankle.

After the Plunkets' deaths, their sons were raised by Lord Plunket's sister, The Hon. Helen Rhodes, and her husband, Arthur Tahu Rhodes.

Lord and Lady Plunket had three sons:

- Patrick Terence William Span Plunket, 7th Baron Plunket (b. 8 Sep 1923, d. 1975)
- Captain Robin Rathmore Plunket, 8th Baron Plunket (b. 3 Dec 1925, d. 16 Nov 2013)
- The Hon. Shaun Albert Frederick Sheridan Plunket (b. 5 Apr 1931, d. 10 January 2012)

Coat of arms of Terence Plunket, 6th Baron Plunket
| Crest A horse passant Argent charged on the shoulder with a portcullis. Escutcheon Sable a bend a castle in chief and a portcullis in base Argent. Supporters Dexter an antelope Proper sinister a horse Argent both charged on the shoulder with a portcullis Sable. Motto Festina Lente |

== See also ==
- List of hereditary Baronies in the Peerage of the United Kingdom

Peerage of the United Kingdom
| Preceded by William Plunket | Baron Plunket; 1920–1938 | Succeeded by Patrick Plunket |
