= Baron Plunket =

Barony in the Peerage of the United Kingdom

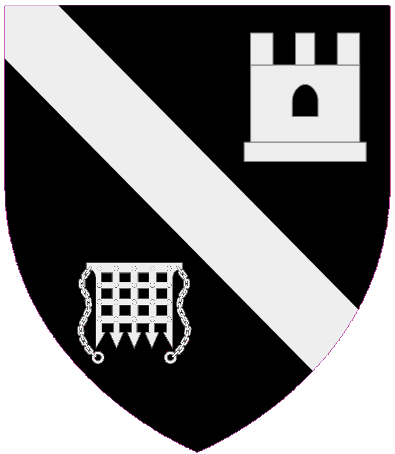
- Crest: A horse passant Argent charged on the shoulder with a portcullis.
- Supporters: Dexter an antelope Proper sinister a horse Argent both charged on the shoulder with a portcullis Sable.
- Motto: Festina Lente

Baron Plunket, of Newtown in the County of Cork, is a title in the Peerage of the United Kingdom. It was created in 1827 for the prominent Irish lawyer and Whig politician William Plunket. He served as Lord Chancellor of Ireland from 1830 and 1834 and again from 1835 to 1841. His eldest son, the second Baron, was Bishop of Tuam, Killala and Achonry between 1839 and 1866. He was succeeded by his younger brother, the third Baron. He was a barrister. His eldest son, the fourth Baron, served as Archbishop of Dublin between 1884 and 1897. He was succeeded by his eldest son, the fifth Baron. He was a diplomat and held office as Governor of New Zealand between 1904 and 1910. His grandson, Patrick, the seventh Baron, was Equerry to both King George VI and Queen Elizabeth II. He was succeeded by his younger brother, Robin who died in 2013 and was in turn succeeded by his nephew, Tyrone who was a Page of Honour to Queen Elizabeth II. Two other members of the family have also gained distinction. The Hon. David Plunket, the second son of the third Baron, was a Conservative politician and was created Baron Rathmore in 1895. The Most Reverend the Hon. Benjamin Plunket, the second son of the fourth Baron, was Bishop of Meath from 1919 to 1925.

The seventh and eighth barons were related to the Marquesses of Londonderry. Their mother, the wife of the sixth baron, was the illegitimate daughter of the actress Fannie Ward and The 7th Marquess of Londonderry. After the sixth baron and his wife were killed in an air accident in 1938, the three Plunket brothers were raised by an aunt and uncle.

== Barons Plunket (1827) ==
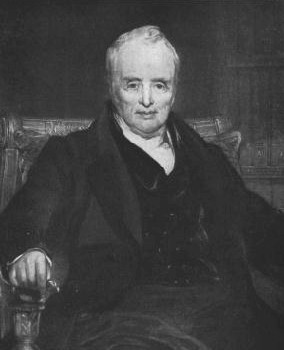
William Plunket, 1st Baron Plunket

- William Conyngham Plunket, 1st Baron Plunket (1764–1854)
- Thomas Span Plunket, 2nd Baron Plunket (1792–1866)
- John Span Plunket, 3rd Baron Plunket (1793–1871)
- William Conyngham Plunket, 4th Baron Plunket (1828–1897)
- William Lee Plunket, 5th Baron Plunket (1864–1920)
- Terence Conyngham Plunket, 6th Baron Plunket (1899–1938)
- Patrick Terence William Span Plunket, 7th Baron Plunket (1923–1975)
- Robin Rathmore Plunket, 8th Baron Plunket (1925–2013)
- Tyrone Shaun Terence Plunket, 9th Baron Plunket (b. 1966)

The heir apparent is the present holder's eldest son Hon. Rory Peter Robin Plunket (b. 2001).

== See also ==
- Baron Rathmore
