= Thomas Clement Thompson =

Irish artist (1780–1857)

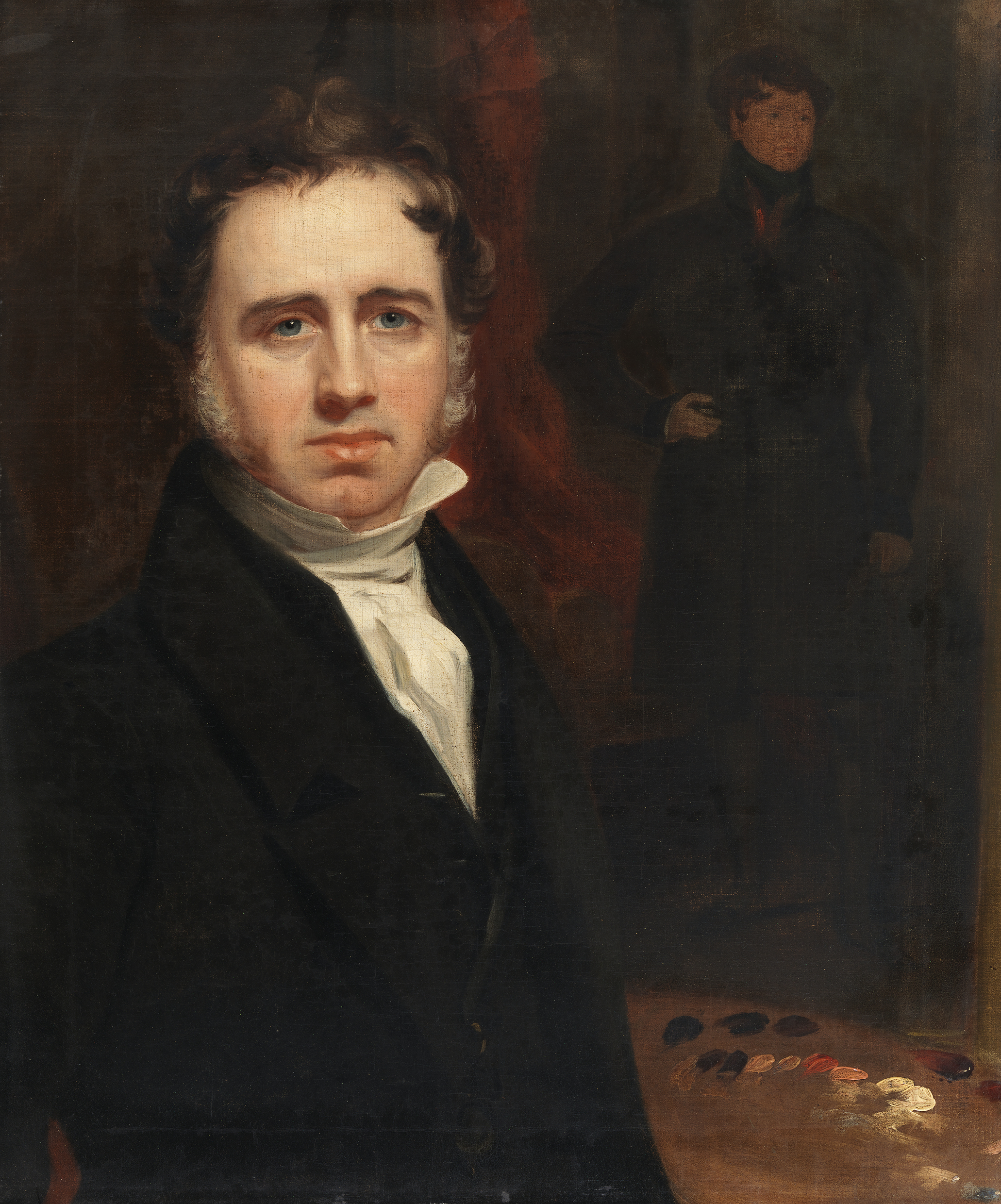
- Born: 1778
- Died: 1857 (aged 78–79)
- Occupation: Painter

Thomas Clement Thompson (1780 – 11 February 1857) was an Irish artist and a founder member of the Royal Hibernian Academy.

Thomas Thompson was born in Belfast in 1780. He embarked on a career as a painter of portrait miniatures in Belfast and Dublin after studying art at the Dublin Society Schools from 1796. Some time between 1803 and 1809, he changed tack to specialise in large-scale portraiture, although he did paint some landscapes. By around 1817 he had moved from the successful studio he had established in Dublin to a new studio in London and was exhibiting at the Royal Academy, an institution at whose exhibitions he regularly featured until 1847. An elected founder member of the Royal Hibernian Academy, he also exhibited there on occasion between 1826–52.

Thompson moved his home from London to Cheltenham in 1848. There he died from bronchitis on 11 February 1857.

People who sat for Thompson include George IV, as well as many people from high society and politics.
