= Attorney General Herbert =

Attorney General Herbert may refer to:

- Edward Herbert (attorney-general) (c. 1591–1658), Attorney General for England and Wales
- Thomas J. Herbert (1894–1974), Attorney General of Ohio
