= Killeen Castle, Dunsany =

19th-century castle on historic site, County Meath, Ireland

Coordinates: 53.534°N 6.584°W

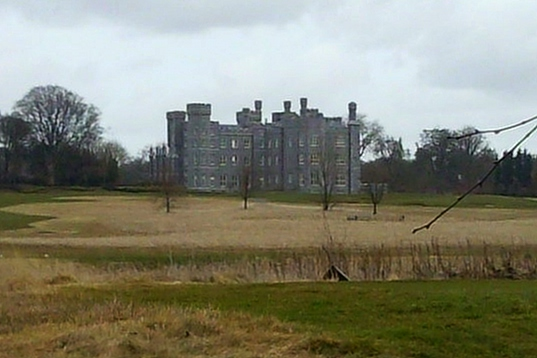
Killeen Castle before 2000s restoration

Killeen Castle (Irish: Caisleán an Chillín), located in Dunsany, County Meath, Ireland, is the current construction on a site occupied by a castle since around 1180. The current building is a restoration of a largely 19th-century structure, burnt out in 1981.

Killeen was built as one of a pair of castles either side of a major roadway north, the other being the extant Dunsany Castle. Its estate was occupied continuously by the Cusack, and then after a marriage, Plunkett, families, from 1172 to 1951.

== History ==
=== The Cusacks ===
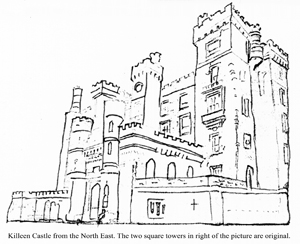
Killeen Castle, County Meath

The original structure at Killeen Castle is said to have been a Norman fortification, perhaps wooden, built for the de Lacy magnates, and held from 1172 by the Cusack family, beginning with Geoffrey de Cusack. The stone castle was built by Geoffrey de Cusack around 1181. The date is carved above the doorway. Killeen Castle was the seat of the de Cusacks for over 250 years, from Geoffrey de Cusack (1172) until Lady Joan de Cusack (1441), who with her husband, Sir Christoper Plunkett, "caused the church to be built beside the castle.". This chantry church is now a national monument

An early recorded description of the castle and its interior reads:

The date is Aug 1st (the feast of St. Peter's Chains). As we approach the castle we are faced by four tall battlemented towers with five storeys of slit openings linking the curtain walls of the building. The castle is set on a slight mound. We enter by a steep wooden stairway, and find ourselves, having passed through the considerable thickness of the wall from the narrow doorway, into the Great Hall on the first floor. Rushes cover the stone flags, and besides the usual furniture, such as a trestle-table, benches and the straight-backed, carved, oaken armchair of the Lord of the Manor, we note on our left a heavy green and white curtain covering one wall of the Hall. Opposite us with its sloping stone hood is the fireplace with logs burning in the grate. The right hand wall is hung with the Lord's war harness, his morion, hunting trophies and feathered lure used in falconry. It is a costly piece with a perch and gilt borders.

In such surroundings the de Cusacks, Lords of Killeen, lived, made war, and expanded their fiefdoms for 225 years until the castle passed to the Plunketts through the marriage of Lady Joan de Cusack to Christopher Plunkett of Rathregan in 1399.

=== The Plunketts ===
The first Plunkett to hold the castle, Sir Christopher, became the 1st Baron Killeen, and divided his estate between his elder two sons, the second son taking possession of sister castle, Dunsany, and later becoming the 1st Baron Dunsany. The elder branch continued as Barons of Killeen, and later Earls of Fingall. The third, Sir Thomas Fitz-Christopher Plunket, married heiress Mary Ann Cruice of Rathmore, daughter of Sir Christopher Cruice of Cruicetown, Moydorrah and Rathmore Castle - a crucifix in their honour is located on the demesne. The fourth and sixth sons founded other landed houses. Dunsoghly Castle, one of the few intact fifteenth-century castles in Ireland, was built by the family of Sir Robert Plunket, the fourth son, between 1450 and 1480. An additional title, as Baron Fingall, in the Peerage of the United Kingdom, was acquired in 1831. While the titles survived, the Killeens were the premier Catholic peers of Ireland.

The castle was developed over time, and by the fifteenth century was a mid-size fortified tower house.

The two branches of the original family remained close through the centuries and during the worst of the Penal Laws, the Dunsany branch, having survived transportation to Connacht under Cromwell and other difficulties, converted to the Church of Ireland, and held Killeen in trust for the elder branch, which remained Roman Catholic. Unlike some arrangements of this sort, Killeen was formally returned when the legal situation changed.

The castle fell into disrepair in the late 17th century, was leased out, and was not restored until around 1779, when parts of the demesne were landscaped and some of the estate features were added.

Significant reworking was carried out from 1803 to 1813 under the supervision of Francis Johnston, and in 1841, much of the castle was demolished and rebuilt (using much existing material) by The 9th Earl of Fingall, in the style of a small Windsor Castle. The two towers added have the dates 1181 and 1841 inscribed, and at the time of completion, it was said that Killeen had 365 windows.

=== After the Plunketts ===
The 12th Earl of Fingall (1896–1984), the last to hold the earldom, sold Killeen Castle and its remaining estate in 1951, to Sir Victor Sassoon. The Earl remained as manager of the stud farm established near the castle. In 1953, the Earl and Countess moved to a modern house built on the lands, and most of the house contents were sold. Sassoon died in 1961 and his heirs sold the estate on in 1963, to French art dealer and major racehorse owner, Daniel Wildenstein.

The last Earl moved from the estate to Corballis on the Dunsany Estate, then The Commons. He died in 1984 and is buried at Dunsany Church.

In 1978, the castle and estate were sold to advertiser Basil Brindley, who continued the stud farm operation. On 16 May 1981, the castle was burnt out in an arson attack, being left abandoned for many years. The lands and buildings were sold again in 1989.

=== New development ===
In 1989, a new development plan was proposed, and later revised, with multiple applications for permission, including the conversion of the castle into a high-end hotel, the installation of a championship standard golf course and the construction of more than one hundred units of luxury housing on the estate. With successive modifications and discussions, plans were approved, with conditions to protect parts of the demesne landscape, and estate features, including a holy well. Work began in 2005.

In August 2006 it was announced that Killeen Castle would open in 2009 as a 179-room luxury golf and spa hotel under The Luxury Collection brand. However, in early 2009, Starwood withdrew from the project after plans were scaled down by developers Snowbury following a downturn in the tourism and leisure industry.

==== Golf ====
On 14 December 2006, after over a year of bidding, Killeen Castle was chosen as the host venue for the 2011 Solheim Cup, the first time Ireland had ever hosted this event, despite the fact that the golf course had yet to be constructed. The 18-hole championship course was designed by Jack Nicklaus and opened in 2008; it hosted the revived Ladies Irish Open on the Ladies European Tour in August 2010 and 2011 in the run up to the Solheim Cup.

"Dave Pelz Scoring Game School" opened at Killeen Castle estate in June 2008, with a focus on the game within 100 yards (91 m) of the hole.

== Contents ==
The demesne contains the castle itself, a substantial stable yard, a church (sometimes, incorrectly, called "Killeen Abbey"), a holy well (the "Lady Well"), a pond, a walled garden and other features.

The church, dedicated to the Blessed Virgin Mary, was erected around 1425, is in the Gothic style and has an adjacent cemetery. It is preserved as a National Monument.

== Popular media ==
In 1966, scenes directed by John Huston for the film Casino Royale were filmed at the castle. For the purposes of the film, the castle was named 'Castle McTarry'.

== External sources ==
- Dunsany, County Meath, April 1991: Carty/Lynch - The History of Killeen Castle; Mary Rose Carty, ISBN 0-95173820-8
- Navan History, Mary Anne Cruise
