= Plunketts Creek =

Plunketts Creek may refer to:

- Plunketts Creek Township, Pennsylvania
- Plunketts Creek (Loyalsock Creek), a tributary of Loyalsock Creek in Pennsylvania
- Hillsgrove Township, Sullivan County, Pennsylvania, formerly Plunketts Creek Township
- Plunkett Creek (Tennessee) or Plunketts Creek

== See also ==
- Plunketts Creek Bridge No. 3, a stone arch bridge over the tributary of Loyalsock Creek, destroyed in a 1996 flood
