= Battle of Rathmines =

1649 battle

- Part of Irish Confederate Wars
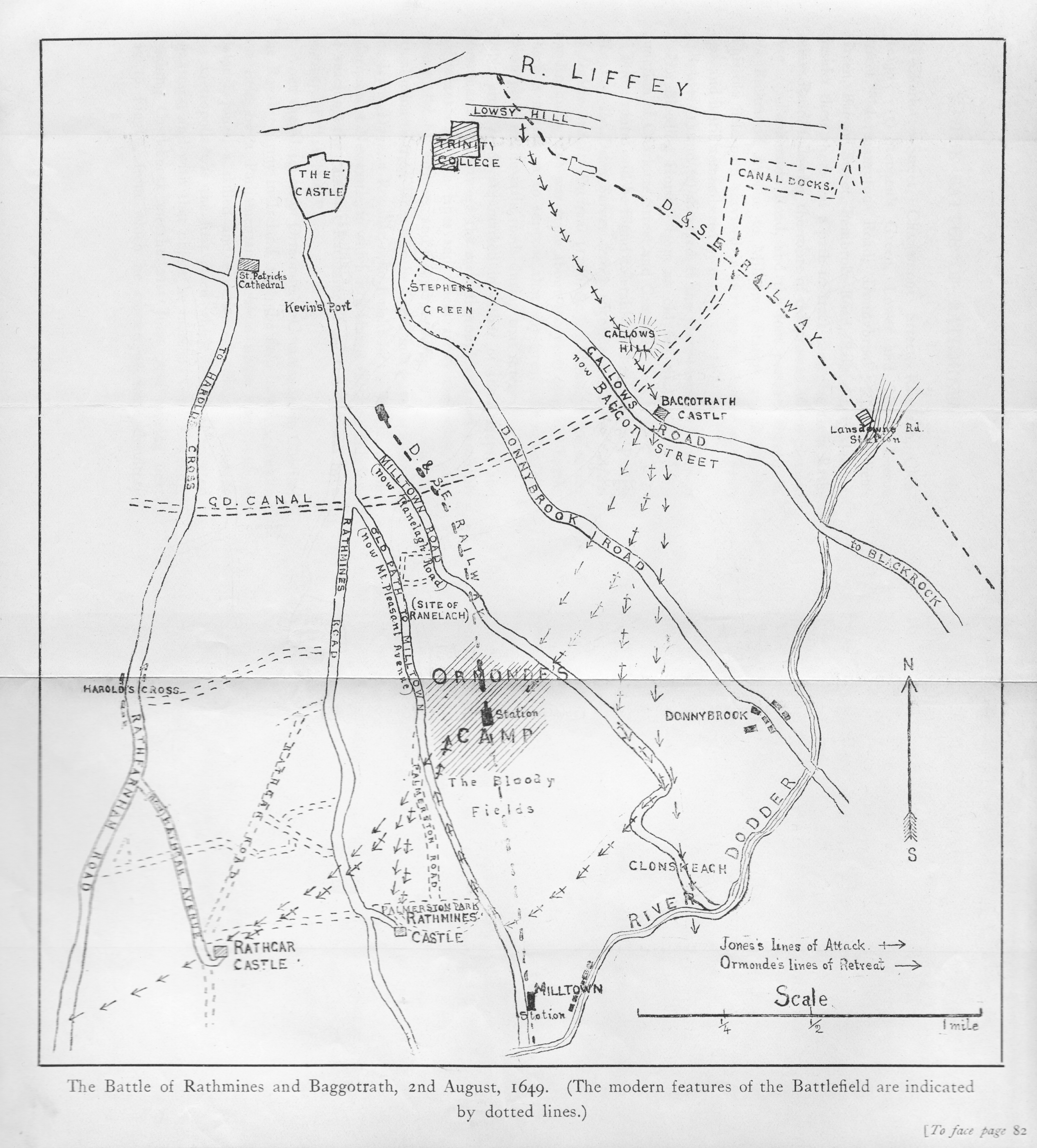
- Battle of Rathmines, 2 August 1649
Date	2 August 1649
Location	Rathmines, County Dublin
Result	Commonwealth of England victory

Belligerents
Commonwealth of England	Royalists; Confederates

Commanders and leaders
Michael Jones; Robert Venables	Earl of Ormonde; Sir William Vaughan †; Viscount Dillon; Major-General Purcell

Strength
5,200	11,000

Casualties and losses
Low	1,000 to 4,000 killed, wounded or captured

The Battle of Rathmines, 2 August 1649, took place outside Dublin, in the suburb of Rathmines. Part of the Irish Confederate Wars and 1639 to 1653 Wars of the Three Kingdoms, it has been described as the 'decisive battle of the Engagement in Ireland.'

In late July 1649, a combined Irish Confederate/Royalist army under the Earl of Ormond, tried to capture Dublin. This was held by forces loyal to the Commonwealth under Michael Jones. Despite their superior numbers, Ormond's troops were routed by Jones' veterans, many of whom were members of the New Model Army.

Victory secured Dublin for the Commonwealth, enabling another 12,000 troops to land unimpeded a few days later, and begin the Cromwellian conquest of Ireland.

== Background ==
The Irish Rebellion of 1641 led to the establishment of the Catholic Confederation, based in Kilkenny, and the Irish Confederate Wars. From 1641 to 1643, the main struggle was between the Confederation and Irish and English Royalists, with what amounted to a separate war in Ulster. This featured Gaelic Catholic leader Eoghan Ó Néill, versus Ulster Protestants, supported by a Scots Covenanter army under Robert Monro.

In September 1643, Charles I's commander in Ireland, the Duke of Ormond, agreed to a truce, or 'Cessation', with the Confederation. This freed his troops for use in the First English Civil War, and over 5,000 of these veterans were shipped to England. Fighting continued in Ulster, while some Irish Protestants objected to the deal and defected to the Parliamentarians, including the Earl of Inchiquin. Others, such as Sir Charles Coote, and Michael Jones, joined Parliamentarian forces in England.

Despite his surrender in 1646, Charles continued secret negotiations with the Catholic Confederation for military support. Rather than allow his former opponents to occupy Dublin, in June 1647 Ormond handed over the town to Jones, recently appointed by Parliament as the new governor. He went into exile, while Jones won a series of victories in Leinster, successfully preventing Irish intervention in the 1648 Second English Civil War.

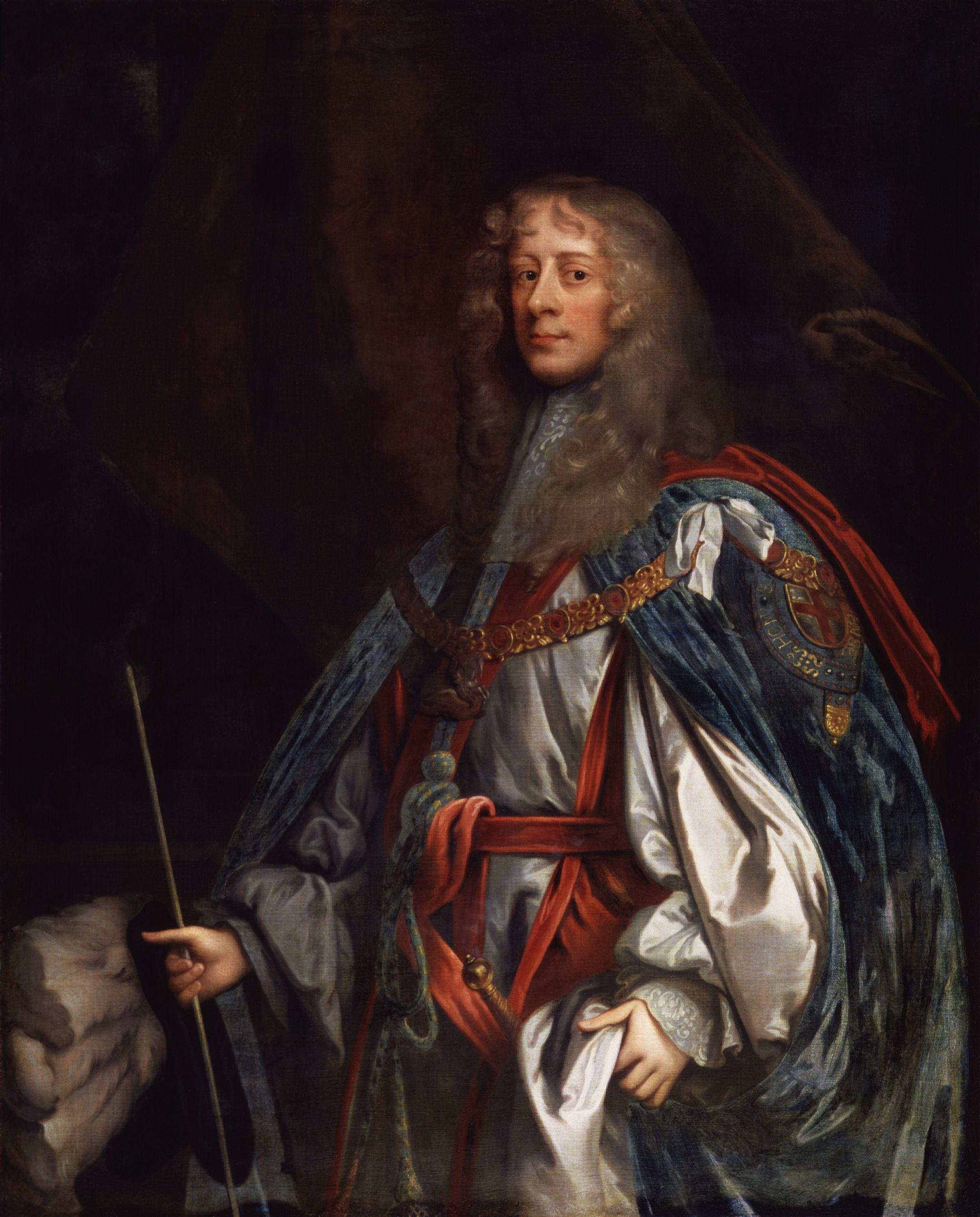
Ormond, leader of the Allied army at Rathmines

On his return to Ireland in October 1648, Ormond met with Inchiquin, who changed sides once more, and on 17 January 1649 agreed to an alliance with the Confederation. The Royalists led by Ormond were primarily members of Protestant Church of Ireland, English exiles, and a small number of Irish Catholics like Clanricarde. Most of the rank and file were locally recruited Protestants, with significant numbers of former English Royalist soldiers, many shipped to Ireland by Parliament to remove them as a threat.

After the beheading of Charles I on 30 January, Ormond was joined by Ulster Presbyterians, who like their compatriots in Scotland strongly objected to his execution by the Commonwealth. Ó Néill now agreed a separate truce with George Monck, Parliamentarian commander in Ulster. This was quickly disavowed by London, but Ó Néill's defection fatally damaged the Confederation, and their alliance with the Royalists.

Since troops were rarely paid and supplies scarce, their provision was an important factor, and control of the sea gave the Commonwealth a decisive advantage. Although religion generally took precedence, motives and loyalties were complex, and many of the parties fought one another at different times, in a war marked by atrocities on both sides. 2,000 to 3,000 Protestants died in the pursuit that followed Ó Néill's victory at Benburb in June 1646, with a similar number of Catholic casualties after Inchiquin's victory at Knocknanuss in December 1647.

== Battle ==
1649 campaign in Ireland; key locations

Despite diverting vital resources trying to subdue Ó Néill, by the end of May, the Alliance controlled most of Ireland. After capturing Drogheda and Dundalk in June, Ormond moved onto Dublin, seeking to prevent its use by an expeditionary force currently being assembled by Cromwell. He hoped for naval support from Prince Rupert's small Royalist squadron, but this was blockaded in Kinsale by the Commonwealth admiral Robert Blake.

Jones had less than 3,000 men facing an Allied army of over 11,000, although his were of much higher quality. On 22 July, Ormond arrived outside Dublin, and stationed his main force on the south bank of the River Liffey, with 2,500 men under Viscount Dillon investing the Northside. However, on 26 July, Jones received four regiments of reinforcements from Chester under Robert Venables, increasing his strength to 4,000 infantry, and 1,200 cavalry, the vast majority experienced veterans.

Combined with news Cromwell and another 9,000 were about to sail from Bristol, an Allied Council of War decided to speed up operations. On the 28th, they captured Rathfarnham Castle, cutting Dublin's main water supply. Just after midnight on 2 August, Ormond sent 1,500 men under Major-General Patrick Purcell to occupy the partially demolished Baggotrath Castle, on the site of the present-day Baggot Street bridge; its possession would allow their artillery to fire on ships entering the harbour.

For reasons that are unclear, Purcell took several hours to reach Baggotrath, less than a mile away from the camp. Alerted by the noise, and understanding the intent, Jones drew up his troops on the far side, with the Liffey at his back. Ormond ordered Purcell to make the position defensible, left him some cavalry under Sir William Vaughan, and returned to camp to prepare the rest of his army for action.

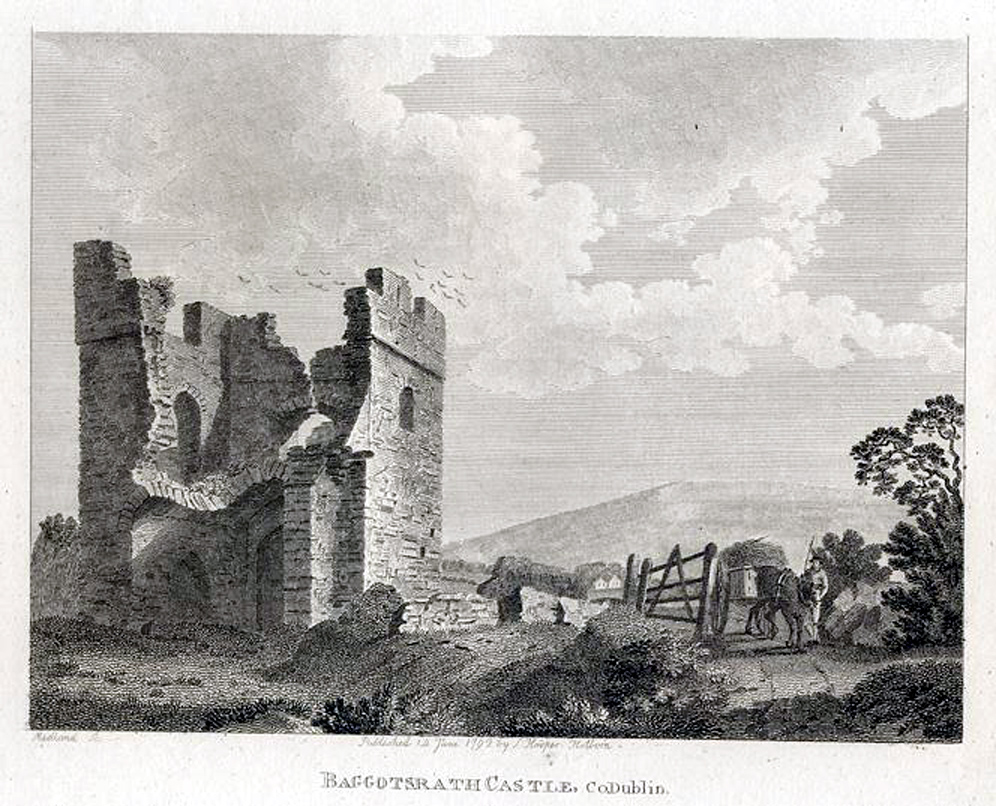
Baggotsrath Castle in 1792

However, Jones immediately attacked, scattering Purcell's men, and killing Vaughan; by 10:00 am, the castle was back in his control. Ormond ordered his troops into battle formation, but Jones continued the assault, sending his cavalry around his flanks, and capturing the artillery train. Although his advance was briefly checked by a regiment under Colonel John Gifford, Ormond's left disintegrated without firing a shot, and by midday, the fighting was over. Dillon withdrew to Drogheda, his retreat covered by 1,000 cavalry under Sir Thomas Armstrong, an experienced Royalist officer.

Hundreds of Royalist and Confederate soldiers were cut down during the pursuit, while in addition to Vaughan, the Earl of Fingall was wounded and captured, dying in Dublin Castle a few days later. Ormond claimed to have lost between 600 and 1,000 men, 300 of whom were allegedly shot after surrendering; Jones reported minimal losses, in return for inflicting 4,000 casualties, including 2,517 prisoners. The consensus among historians is that while Jones' figures may be too high, they are probably closer to the real number of Allied losses.

== Aftermath ==
One of the Royalist officers captured at Rathmines was Richard Elliott, son of Jones's sister Mary; the bitterness engendered by over eight years of brutal warfare was demonstrated by the execution of his nephew along with a number of other prisoners. Jones then displayed typical energy in immediately seeking to take advantage of his success by marching on Drogheda, but when the town refused to surrender he was forced to withdraw, having insufficient troops to storm it.

The victory allowed the Parliamentarian troops to create a defensive line covering the road between Dublin and the port of Ringsend, where Cromwell landed on 15 August, beginning the Cromwellian conquest of Ireland. Divided and demoralised, Protestant Royalists deserted in large numbers over the next few months, including Gifford; Ó Néill now agreed to join Ormonde, but negotiations were only completed shortly before he died in early November. His army played little part in the Parliamentarian campaign that reconquered Ulster from September to December and was destroyed by Sir Charles Coote at Scarrifholis the following year.

Several local landmarks are named after the battle; 'The Bleeding Horse' public house, on the corner of modern Upper Camden Street, allegedly gained its name because its stables were used after the battle to treat injured horses. An area near Milltown was formerly known as the "Bloody Fields", where it is believed some of those killed in the pursuit were buried.

== Sources ==
- Bennett, Martyn (1999). The Civil Wars Experienced: Britain and Ireland, 1638-1661. Routledge. ISBN 978-0415159029.
- Brooke-Tyrrell, Alma (1970). "Michael Jones: Governor of Dublin". Dublin Historical Record. 24 (1): 159–172. JSTOR 30103903.
- Butler, Sir Geoffrey; Maccoby, Simon (1928). The Development of International Law (2007 ed.). The Lawbook Exchange. ISBN 978-1584772156.
- Finnegan, David (2014). "The Irish Catholic clergy, Stuart sovereignty and the 1650 appeal to the Duke of Lorraine". Revue électronique d'études sur le monde anglophone. 11 (4). doi:10.4000/erea.3734.
- Hayes-McCoy, Gerard Anthony (1990) [1969]. Irish Battles: A Military History of Ireland. Belfast: The Appletree Press. ISBN 0-86281-250-X.
- Brunskill, HO (1939). "The Battle of Rathmines: 2nd August, 1649". Dublin Historical Record. 2 (1): 18–29. JSTOR 30080102.
- Macleod, Donald (Autumn 2009). "The influence of Calvinism on politics" (PDF). Theology in Scotland. XVI (2).
- McKeiver, Phillip (2008). A New History of Cromwell's Irish Campaign. Advance Press. ISBN 978-0955466304.
- Plant, David. "Michael Jones". BCW Project.
- Roberts, Keith (2005). Cromwell's War Machine: The New Model Army, 1645–1660. Leo Cooper. ISBN 978-1844150946.
- Robertson, Barry (2014). Royalists at War in Scotland and Ireland, 1638–1650. Ashgate. ISBN 978-1409457473.
- Royle, Trevor (2004). Civil War: The Wars of the Three Kingdoms 1638–1660 (2006 ed.). Abacus. ISBN 978-0-349-11564-1.
- Scott, David (2003). Politics and War in the Three Stuart Kingdoms, 1637-49. Palgrave. ISBN 978-0333658741.
- Wedgwood, CV (1958). The King's War, 1641-1647 (2001 ed.). Penguin Classics. ISBN 978-0141390727.
