= Arthur Plunkett, 9th Earl of Fingall =

Irish peer and political campaigner

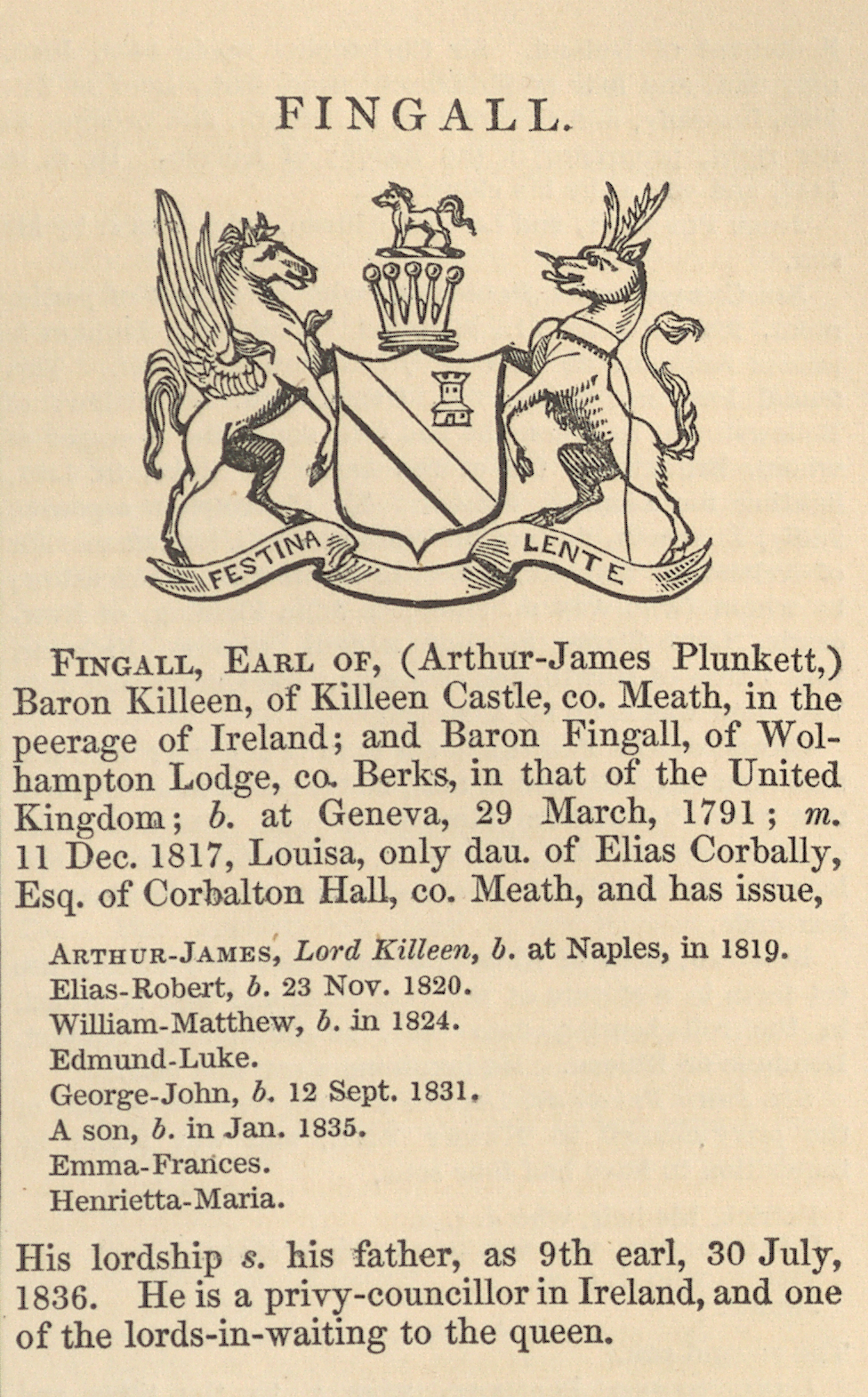

Arthur James Plunkett, 9th Earl of Fingall KP PC (I) (29 March 1791 – 21 April 1869) was an Irish peer, styled Lord Killeen from 1797 to 1836. He became Earl of Fingall in 1836 on the death of his father the 8th Earl and was appointed a Knight of the Order of St Patrick on 9 October 1846. His mother was Frances Donelan, daughter of John Donelan of Ballydonnellan, County Galway, and his wife Mabel Hore.

Like his father he was a convinced supporter of the cause of Catholic emancipation. Both father and son worked for years with Daniel O'Connell to achieve it.

He married Louisa Emilia Corbally, daughter of Elias Corbally of Corbalton Hall, County Meath and his wife Mary Netterville (née Keogh), and had eight children, including Arthur, 10th Earl of Fingall, and the noted diplomat Sir Francis Richard Plunkett.

Parliament of the United Kingdom
Preceded by Sir Marcus Somerville; The Marquess of Headfort	Member of Parliament for County Meath; 1830–1832; With: Sir Marcus Somerville 1830–1831; Henry Grattan 1831–1832	Succeeded by Henry Grattan; Morgan O'Connell
Honorary titles
Preceded by The Lord Dunsany	Lord Lieutenant of Meath; 1849–1869	Succeeded by The Marquess Conyngham
Peerage of Ireland
Preceded by Arthur Plunkett	Earl of Fingall; 1836–1869	Succeeded by Arthur Plunkett
