= Ballymascanlan =

Village in County Louth, Ireland

Coordinates: 54.0283°N 6.3508°W

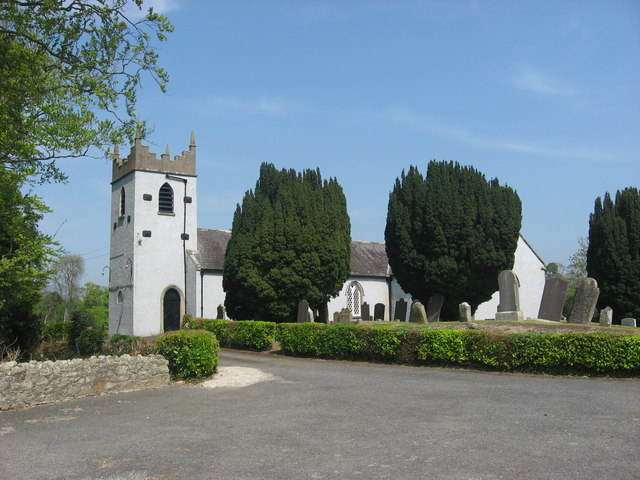
St Mary's Church of Ireland, Ballymascanlan

Ballymascanlan (Irish: Baile Mhic Scanláin), otherwise Ballymascanlon, is a small village and townland in County Louth, Ireland. It is 4 km (2.5 mi) north-east of Dundalk on the Cooley Peninsula, on the road to Carlingford. The village is in a civil parish of the same name.

== Locale ==
The townland runs down to the coast, and is bounded by the Flurry River, running south and reaching the sea at its edge, and a late tributary running east.

== History ==
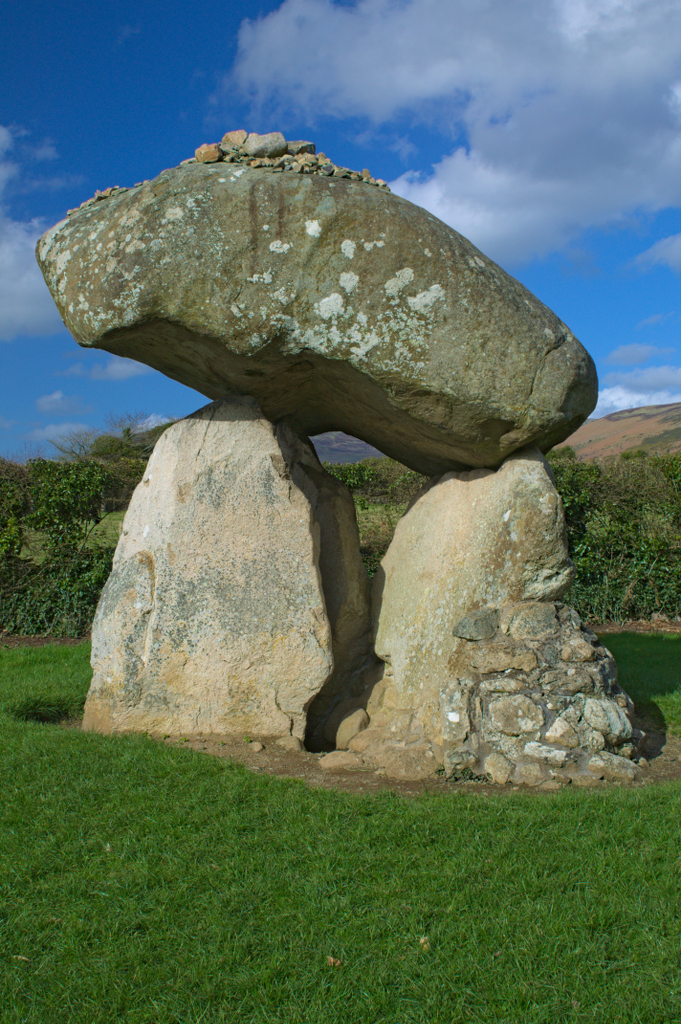
The dolmen at Proleek

The name Ballymascanlan means "town of the son of Scanlan": a reference to Scanlan, son of Fingin, chief of the Uí Méith, who died in 672. The Uí Méith were rulers in the kingdom of Oriel until the Anglo-Norman period. An Uí Méith is credited with having defeated the Danes in Dundalk Bay in 833. The village of Omeath on Carlingford Lough also takes name from this group.

In 1185, during the Norman-English period, the district of Ballymascanlan as far north as Carrickarnon was donated by Hugh de Lacy to the Cistercian Abbey of Mellifont.

Following the dissolution of the monasteries by King Henry VIII the lordship of Ballymascanlan was granted to Sir Edward Moore, ancestor of the Marquess of Drogheda. Sir Garret Moore, 1st Viscount Moore inherited the title and estates in 1600 and was a friend of Hugh O'Neill, the Earl of Tyrone, who was a frequent visitor to Mellifont and Ballymascanlon. The associated 'Lands of Ballymascanlon' were transferred from Armagh to Louth circa 1630. It remained in the hands of the Moore family until the middle of the 18th century.

In 1688 the brothers Malcolm and Archibald Mcneill, officers of William III landed in Dundalk and defeated the Celtic Scanlons in the Battle of Ballymascanlon.

== Amenities ==
Ballymascanlan House Hotel is an extended Victorian house on grounds remaining from an estate dating back centuries. The hotel has a leisure centre and swimming pool which allow paid public access, and the grounds include a golf course.

== Monuments ==
On the grounds of the hotel, though strictly speaking in the next townland to the north, Proleek, are a ruined wedge tomb and a portal dolmen. The dolmen, known as "The Giant's Load," has a 40 tonne capstone and three supporting stones.

== See also ==
- List of towns and villages in Ireland
