= Christopher Plunket, 2nd Earl of Fingall =

Irish soldier (died 1649)

Christopher Plunket
- Earl of Fingall
- Tenure: 1637–1649
- Predecessor: Luke, 1st Earl of Fingall
- Successor: Luke, 3rd Earl of Fingall
- Died: August 1649
- Spouse: Mabel Barnewall
- Issue Detail: Luke, & others
- Father: Luke, 1st Earl of Fingall
- Mother: Susanna Brabazon

Christopher Plunket, 2nd Earl of Fingall and 11th Baron Killeen (died 1649) was an Irish politician and soldier. In 1641 he negotiated with the rebels on behalf of the Old English of the Pale and pushed them to join the rebellion. He fought for the rebels at the siege of Drogheda. He joined the Confederates and fought in their Leinster army, notably at Dungan's Hill. When the Confederates fused into the Royalist Alliance, he fought under James Butler, 1st Duke of Ormond in the Battle of Rathmines where he was wounded and taken prisoner. He died of his wounds two weeks later in captivity at Dublin Castle.

== Birth and origins ==
Christopher was probably born in the late 1610s in County Meath, Ireland. (Note: His birth date is constrained by his parents' marriage in 1611 and his mother's death in 1623. However, the special livery of his estates at his father's death in 1637 indicates that he was not far from coming off age at that time.) He was the eldest son of Lucas Plunket and his second wife Susanna Brabazon. His father was then the 10th Baron Killeen (since 1613) and would on 26 September 1628 be created Earl of Fingall. His father's family is believed to be of Norman origin and is attested in Ireland from the 11th century onwards.

His mother was the fifth daughter of Edward Brabazon, 1st Baron Ardee and his wife Mary Smythe. Her grandfather had come from England to Ireland as vice-treasurer of Ireland and had been Lord Justice of Ireland. His parents had married in 1611.

Family tree

Christopher Plunkett with his wife, parents, and other selected relatives. (Note: This family tree is derived from two published trees, and classical genealogical sources. Also see the list of children in the text.)

Henry; FitzGerald; 12th Earl; Kildare; 1562–1597	Christopher; Plunket; 9th Baron; Killeen; 1564–1613	Edward; 1st Baron; Ardee c.1548 – 1625
Elizabeth; FitzGerald	Luke; 1st Earl d. 1637	Susanna; Brabazon d. 1623	Nicholas; Barnewall; 1st Viscount; 1592–1663
Richard of Kilcash; 1615–1701	Christopher; 2nd Earl d. 1649	Mabel; Barnewall	Donough; 1st Earl; Clancarty; 1594–1665
Walter of Garryricken d. 1700 d.v.p.*	Mary; Plunket	Luke; 3rd Earl; 1639–1684	Margaret; MacCarty d. 1704
Thomas of Garryricken d. 1738; Colonel	Peter; 4th Earl; 1678–1718

Legend

XXX	Subject of the article	XXX	Earls of Fingall	XXX	Earls of Clancarty	XXX	Viscounts; Barnewall

*d.v.p. = predeceased his father (decessit vita patris).

Christopher was the eldest of at least four brothers (but only Christopher and George are known):

- Christopher (died 1649)
- George, the fourth son, married Cicely, daughter of Sir William Hill, of Allenston, County Meath, was captain at the siege of Drogheda, and colonel of a regiment of foot in the Confederate army

== Early life ==
Christopher's mother died in 1623. She had been a Protestant. After her death, his father made sure that Christopher would be raised in the Catholic faith.

== Marriage and children ==
in January 1636 Killeen married Mabel, daughter of Nicholas Barnewall, 1st viscount Kingsland and Lady Bridget FitzGerald. She would survive him by 50 years and would, in 1653, remarry to Colonel James Barnewall, youngest son of Sir Patrick Barnewall.

Christopher and Mabel had five sons (of which the younger three are poorly known):

1. Luke (1639–1684), his heir, who recovered the estate and title in 1662.
2. Nicholas, married Anne Taaffe, daughter of Theobald Taaffe, 1st Earl of Carlingford
3. ____ (died 1664) buried at St. Catherine, 20 September
4. Patrick (died 1666), buried at St Michan's, 3 June
5. ____ of county Monaghan

—and a daughter:

- Mary, married Walter Butler of Garryricken, nephew of James Butler, 1st Duke of Ormonde: they were the grandparents of John Butler, 15th Earl of Ormonde.

== Honours and parliament ==
In 1637 Killeen succeeded his father as the 2nd Earl of Fingall. On 20 March that year Lord Fingall received special livery of his estates. he inherited great estates in County Meath and County Cavan, and played a part in developing the town of Virginia, County Cavan.

Lord Fingall took his seat in the House of Lords of the Irish Parliament on 16 March 1639, and was a member of several committees for privileges and grievances.

== Irish wars, death, and timeline ==
When the Rebellion broke out on 23 October 1641, Fingall tried to stay neutral between the government and the rebel as most of the nobility and gentry of the Pale did. On 16 November he was appointed a commissioner to negotiate with the rebels, "with a view to suspend for some time the sad effects of licentiousness and rapine, until the kingdom was put in a better posture of defence".

His behaviour caused him to be mistrusted by the Government, and on 17 November he was proclaimed an outlaw. He thereupon played a prominent role in bringing about an alliance between the Ulster party and the nobility and gentry of the Pale. He was present at the meeting at the Hill of Crofty, and subsequently at that at the Hill of Tara, where he was appointed general of the horse for the county of Meath. He, therefore, led the rebel horse at the siege of Drogheda. His name is attached to the principal documents drawn up by the Irish Confederates in justification of their taking up arms. He was a member of the general assembly of the Confederation of Kilkenny, and, by taking the oath of association against the papal nuncio Giovanni Battista Rinuccini in June 1648, proved his fidelity to the original demands of the confederates; but otherwise, he played an inconspicuous part in the history of the confederation.

=== Death in battle ===
On 2 August 1649 Lord Fingall fought under James Butler, 1st Duke of Ormond at the battle of Rathmines where he was wounded and taken prisoner by the Parliamentarians. He died of his wounds about a fortnight later while in captivity in Dublin Castle. He was buried in St Catherine's Church on 18 August. The Parliamentarians accused him of high treason, and his estates were confiscated by the English Commonwealth's Act for the Settlement of Ireland on 12 August 1652 and Beaulieu was given to Sir Henry Tichborne as tenant to the state by Cromwell. Fingall's son and heir by 1677 had recovered much of the family property, but Beaulieu was permanently lost to the Plunketts.

Timeline
As his birth date is uncertain, so are all his ages.
Age	Date	Event
0	1617, estimate	Born
5–6	1623	Mother died
7–8	1625, 27 Mar	Accession of King Charles I, succeeding King James I
10–11	1628, 26 Sep	Became Lord Killeen as his father was created Earl of Fingall
18–19	1636, Jan	Married Mabel Barnewall
19–20	1637	Succeeded his father as the 2nd Earl of Fingall
21–22	1639, 16 March	Took his seat at the Irish House of Lords
28–29	1646, 5 Jun	Confederate victory at the Battle of Benburb
31–32	1649, 30 Jan	King Charles I beheaded.
31–32	1649, 2 Aug	Fought at the Battle of Rathmines, was wounded and taken prisoner
31–32	1649, Aug	Died at Dublin Castle

== Notes and references ==
=== Sources ===
Subject matter monographs:

- Click here. Aidan Clarke 2009 in Dictionary of Irish Biography
- Click here. Robert Dunlop 1896 in Dictionary of National Biography
- Click here. Ohlmeyer 2004 in Oxford Dictionary of National Biography
- Armstrong, R. M. (2004). "Tichborne, Sir Henry (1581?–1667)". In Matthew, Colin; Harrison, Brian (eds.). Oxford Dictionary of National Biography. Vol. 54. New York: Oxford University Press. pp. 754–756. ISBN 0-19-861404-7.
- Bellings, Richard (1885). Gilbert, John Thomas (ed.). History of the Irish Confederation and the War in Ireland 1643-1644. Historic literature of Ireland. Vol. III (limited to two hundred copies ed.). Dublin: Printed for the editor by M. H. Gill & Son. – 1643 to 1644
- Burke, Bernard; Burke, Ashworth Peter (1915). A Genealogical and Heraldic History of the Peerage and Baronetage, the Privy Council, Knightage and Companionage (77th ed.). London: Harrison. OCLC 1155471554.
- Clarke, Aidan (October 2009). McGuire, James; Quinn, James (eds.). "Plunket, Christopher". Dictionary of Irish Biography.
- Cokayne, George Edward (1890). Complete Peerage of England, Scotland, Ireland, Great Britain and the United Kingdom, Extant, Extinct, or Dormant. Vol. III (1st ed.). London: George Bell and Sons. OCLC 1180838776. – D to F (for Fingall)
- Cokayne, George Edward (1895). Complete Peerage of England, Scotland, Ireland, Great Britain and the United Kingdom, Extant, Extinct, or Dormant. Vol. VI (1st ed.). London: George Bell and Sons. OCLC 1180818801. – N to R (for Ormonde)
- Cokayne, George Edward (1926). Gibbs, Vicary (ed.). The complete peerage of England, Scotland, Ireland, Great Britain and the United Kingdom, extant, extinct, or dormant. Vol. V (2nd ed.). London: St Catherine Press. OCLC 228661424. – Eardley of Spalding to Goojerat
- Debrett, John (1828). Peerage of the United Kingdom of Great Britain and Ireland. Vol. II (17th ed.). London: F. C. and J. Rivington. OCLC 54499602. – Scotland and Ireland
- Duffy, Seán (2002). The Illustrated History of Ireland. New York: Contemporary Books. ISBN 0-8092-2437-2.
- Dunboyne, Patrick Theobald Tower Butler, Baron (1968). Butler Family History (2nd ed.). Kilkenny: Rothe House.
- Dunlop, Robert (1896). "Plunket, Christopher, second earl of Fingall (d. 1649)". In Lee, Sidney (ed.). Dictionary of National Biography. Vol. XLV. London: Smith, Elder, & Co. pp. 440–441. OCLC 8544105.
- Fryde, Edmund Boleslaw; Greenway, D. E.; Porter, S.; Roy, I., eds. (1986). Handbook of British Chronology. Royal Historical Society Guides and Handbooks, No. 2 (3rd ed.). London: Offices of the Royal Historical Society. ISBN 0-86193-106-8. – (for timeline)
- Lodge, John (1789). Archdall, Mervyn (ed.). The Peerage of Ireland or, A Genealogical History of the Present Nobility of that Kingdom. Vol. VI. Dublin: James Moore. OCLC 264906028. – Viscounts, barons
- Mountmorres, Hervey Redmond Morres, Viscount (1792). The History of the Principal Transactions of the Irish Parliament from the Year 1634 to 1666. Vol. I. London: T. Cadell. OCLC 843863159. – House of Lords
- Ohlmeyer, Jane (2004). "Plunket, Christopher, second earl of Fingal". In Matthew, Colin; Harrison, Brian (eds.). Oxford Dictionary of National Biography. Vol. 44. New York: Oxford University Press. pp. 626–627. ISBN 0-19-861394-6.
- Warner, Ferdinand (1768). History of the Rebellion and Civil-War in Ireland. Vol. I. Dublin: James William. OCLC 82770539. – 1641 to 1643

Peerage of Ireland
Preceded by Luke Plunket	Earl of Fingall; 1637–1649	Succeeded by Luke Plunket
