= Luke Plunket, 1st Earl of Fingall =

Irish peer

Lucas More Plunket of Killeen, County Meath (before 1602 – 29 March 1637), styled Lucas Môr, tenth lord Killeen, created Earl of Fingall on 26 September 1628, was an Irish peer.

== Biography ==
Plunket was the elder son of Christopher Plunket, 9th Baron Killeen, and Jenet, daughter of Sir Lucas Dillon, Chief Baron of the Irish Exchequer and his first wife Jane Bathe. He succeeded to the barony in January 1613.

Plunket was created Earl of Fingall by King's letter of 26 September 1628, "on account of the good testimony which the King had received as to his honour and virtue, and for the encouragement of his continuance in such courses". He was granted 2,400 acres in County Cavan; he was one of the founders of the town of Virginia, County Cavan.

He sat on the Irish House of Lords Committee for Privileges in the Parliament of 1634–5. He was a staunch Roman Catholic and an advocate for The Graces, the programme of religious concessions promised by the English Crown in the 1620s, but never implemented. As a result, he clashed with the Lord Lieutenant of Ireland, the formidable Thomas Wentworth, 1st Earl of Strafford, who was determined to reject the Graces.

== Family ==
Plunket married first Elizabeth FitzGerald, daughter of Henry FitzGerald, 12th Earl of Kildare and Lady Frances Howard. She died, probably of bubonic plague, in 1611.

Plunket married secondly Susannah, daughter of Edward Brabazon, 1st Baron Ardee and Mary Smythe. They had two sons Christopher, who succeeded as 2nd Earl, and George, from whom later Earls of Fingall were descended; and a daughter, Eleanor, who married Andrew Nugent.

Plunket married thirdly Eleanor, daughter of Dudley Bagenal and Mabel FitzGerald, and widow of Sir Thomas Colclough of Tintern Abbey, County Wexford. She died in 1632.

He married fourthly Margaret, daughter of Nicholas St Lawrence, 9th Baron Howth and his second wife Mary White, and widow of Jenico Preston, 5th Viscount Gormanston.

== Notes ==
Peerage of Ireland
New creation	Earl of Fingall; 1628–1637	Succeeded by Christopher Plunket
Preceded by Christopher Plunket	Baron Killeen; 1613–1637	Succeeded by Christopher Plunket
