= Earl of Fingall =

Irish peerage title, in abeyance

Earl of Fingall and Baron of Killeen were titles in the Peerage of Ireland, the latter one of the earliest surviving, while Baron Fingall was a title in the Peerage of the United Kingdom. The seat of the title-holders was, from the 1400s until 1953, Killeen Castle in County Meath, Ireland, and there was an ongoing close relationship with the related Plunkett family of Dunsany, and with the Viscounts Gormanston, with whom they intermarried.

The origins of the Killeen title date to the early or mid-1400s. According to some sources, around 1426 Christopher Plunkett was created Baron Killeen, with several of his seven sons founding separate branches of the Plunkett family, including the Plunketts of Dunsany, Rathmore and Dunsoghly, and his daughter Matilda (or Maud) becoming celebrated as "the bride of Malahide", when her first husband, Thomas Hussey, Baron Galtrim, was reputedly murdered on their wedding day. According to other sources, the line of peers began with the eldest son of that Christopher, also Christopher.

The tenth baron, Luke Plunkett, was created Earl of Fingall on 29 September 1628. When still Baron Killeen, his first wife was Elizabeth, the second daughter of Henry FitzGerald, 12th Earl of Kildare, as properly recorded in the histories of the FitzGeralds of Kildare, based on their own family archives in Carton House and Kilkea Castle, and on no better authority than The 4th Duke of Leinster himself, writing at the time as Marquess of Kildare, who confirmed that Elizabeth married Luke Plunkett, 1st Earl of Fingall, in 1608.

The eighth earl was created Baron Fingall in the Peerage of the United Kingdom on 20 June 1831. He and his son and heir the ninth earl were both ardent supporters of Catholic Emancipation. The eleventh earl married Elizabeth Burke-Plunkett, who was noted both as an activist in numerous causes and as a society hostess. All three titles all believed to have become extinct on the death of the twelfth earl in 1984, and are not to be confused with the Prescriptive Barony or Lordship of Fingal originally granted in 1208 by King John of England.

== The Earls' Fingall Estate Papers ==
The Earls of Fingall’s Fingall Estate Papers (i.e. real property) consist of a large archive of manuscripts and ephemera (17th–20th century), documents incl. deeds, indentures, leases, wills, marriage settlements, incl. many on vellum. The Papers were purchased by the Fingal County Council and lodged in its Fingal Local Studies and Archives Department following an auction by Whyte’s Auctioneers on 6 February 1999 (item 373). However, the lands concerned did not actually extend into the modern Fingal, and the Earls’ Fingall Estate Papers contain no evidence of any ownership in Fingal. Practically all the properties and leases relate to County Meath (or Westmeath), understandably since the Plunketts were originally, as indicated above, Barons of Killeen in County Meath. They essentially have nothing to do with the territory of Fingal, and hence the lands per se never justified the denomination of Fingall as an Earldom and later peerage Barony (both now extinct) for the Plunketts of Killeen in Meath (as the prescriptive barony of Fingal rested with the Viscounts Gormanston by descent from Walter de Lacy who obtained it in 1208). Rather, the evidence indicates that Lord Killeen negotiated and purchased the Earldom for £2,700 during a sojourn in London in 1628.

== Barons Killeen (c.1426) ==
- Christopher Plunket, 1st Baron Killeen (died 1445)
- John Plunket, 2nd Baron Killeen
- Christopher Plunket, 3rd Baron Killeen (died 1487)
- Christopher Plunket, 4th Baron Killeen
- Edmond Plunket, 5th Baron Killeen (c. 1450–1510)
- John Plunket, 6th Baron Killeen (died 1550)
- Christopher Plunket, 7th Baron Killeen (died c.1567)
- James Plunket, 8th Baron Killeen (c.1542–1595)
- Christopher Plunket, 9th Baron Killeen (1564–1613)
- Luke Plunket, 10th Baron Killeen (created Earl of Fingall in 1628)

== Earl of Fingall (1628) ==
- Luke Plunket, 1st Earl of Fingall (1589–1637)
- Christopher Plunket, 2nd Earl of Fingall (died 1649)
- Luke Plunket, 3rd Earl of Fingall (1639–c. 1684)
- Peter Plunket, 4th Earl of Fingall (1678–1718)
- Justin Plunket, 5th Earl of Fingall (died 1734)
- Robert Plunket, 6th Earl of Fingall (died 1738)
- Arthur James Plunket, 7th Earl of Fingall (1731–1793)
- Arthur James Plunkett, 8th Earl of Fingall, 1st Baron Fingall (1759–1836) (created Baron Fingall 1831)
- Arthur James Plunkett, 9th Earl of Fingall, 2nd Baron Fingall (1791–1869)
- Arthur James Plunkett, 10th Earl of Fingall, 3rd Baron Fingall (1819–1881)
- Arthur James Francis Plunkett, 11th Earl of Fingall, 4th Baron Fingall (1859–1929)
- Major Oliver James Horace Plunkett, 12th Earl of Fingall, 5th Baron Fingall, M.C. (1896–1984)
