= Fielding (surname) =

Fielding or Feilding is an English surname.

Notable people with the surname include:

== Business, commerce, science, technology ==
- Amanda Feilding (1943–2025), British artist, scientist and drug policy reformer
- Fred F. Fielding (born 1939), American lawyer
- Henry Barron Fielding (1805–1851), English botanist
- Roy Fielding (born 1965), American computer scientist, one of the principal authors of the HTTP specification
- Thomas Fielding (born abt 1758), English engraver
- Sir Charles William Fielding (1863–1941), British businessman, landowner, farmer, writer, and civil servant

== Military ==
- Charles Fielding or Feilding (1738–1783), British naval officer
- Xan Fielding (1918–1991), British soldier, author, translator, journalist and traveller

== Public service and politics ==
- Sir John Fielding (1721–1780), English magistrate and social reformer
- Sir Leslie Fielding (1932–2021), British former ambassador
- Steve Fielding (born 1960), Australian senator

== Sports ==
- Frank Fielding (born 1988), English football goalkeeper
- Fred Fielding (1889–1918), Australian rules footballer
- Keith Fielding (born 1949), English rugby footballer
- Ross Fielding (1880–1947), English footballer
- William Fielding (1875–1946), New Zealand architect and lawn bowler

== The arts ==
- Copley Fielding (1787–1855), English painter
- Daphne Fielding (1904–1997), British author
- Emma Fielding (born 1970), English actress
- Fenella Fielding (1927–2018), English actress
- Harold Fielding (1916–2003), English theatre producer
- Helen Fielding (born 1958), English novelist and screenwriter, author of Bridget Jones's Diary
- Henry Fielding (1707–1754), English novelist and dramatist, author of Tom Jones
- Janet Fielding (born 1953), Australian actress
- Joy Fielding (born 1945), Canadian novelist and actress
- Mantle Fielding (1865–1941), American architect, art and engraver historian, and tennis player
- Marjorie Fielding (1892–1956), British stage and film actress
- Michael Fielding (born 1982), English comedian and actor
- Noel Fielding (born 1973), English artist, comedian and actor
- Robert Fielding (born 1959), Australian artist, father of Zaachariaha
- Sarah Fielding (1710–1768), English novelist
- Susannah Fielding (born 1985), English actress
- Jerry Fielding (1922–1980), American composer, conductor, and musical director
- William John Fielding (1886–1973), American writer
- Yvette Fielding (born 1968), English broadcaster, producer and actress
- Zaachariaha Fielding, musician (with Electric Fields and artist, son of Robert

== Others ==
- Joseph Fielding (1797–1863), English leader of the Latter-day Saint movement
- William Feilding (disambiguation)

== Earls of Denbigh ==
- William Feilding, 1st Earl of Denbigh
- Basil Feilding, 2nd Earl of Denbigh (1608–1675)
- George Feilding, 1st Earl of Desmond (1614–1665)
- William Feilding, 3rd Earl of Denbigh and 2nd Earl of Desmond (1640–1685)
- Basil Feilding, 4th Earl of Denbigh and 3rd Earl of Desmond (1668–1717)
- William Feilding, 5th Earl of Denbigh and 4th Earl of Desmond (1697–1755)
- Basil Feilding, 6th Earl of Denbigh and 5th Earl of Desmond (1719–1800)
  - William Robert Feilding, Viscount Feilding (1760–1799)
- William Basil Percy Feilding, 7th Earl of Denbigh and 6th Earl of Desmond (1796–1865)
- Rollo William Basil Feilding, 8th Earl of Denbigh and 7th Earl of Desmond (1823–1892)
- Rollo Robert Basil Aloysius Augustine Feilding, 9th Earl of Denbigh and 8th Earl of Desmond (1859–1939)
  - Rollo Edmund Aloysius Feilding, Viscount Feilding (1885–1937)
- William Rollo Stephen Feilding, 10th Earl of Denbigh and 9th Earl of Desmond (1912–1966)
- Rollo William Michael Feilding, 11th Earl of Denbigh and 10th Earl of Desmond (1943–1995)
- Alexander Stephen Rudolph Feilding, 12th Earl of Denbigh and 11th Earl of Desmond (b. 1970)

== Fictional characters ==
- Caroline Fairchild (née Fielding), leading character in Executive Stress
- Matt Fielding, fictional character in American television series Melrose Place
- Russell 'Russ' Fielding fictional character in Beverly Hills Cop II
- Walter Fielding fictional character inThe Money Pit

== See also ==
- R. Fielding Dodd (c.1890–1958), Scottish architect
- Earl of Denbigh
