= William Feilding =

William Feilding may refer to:

- Sir William Feilding (died 1471), Lancastrian and knight of the shire for Leicestershire
- William Feilding, 1st Earl of Denbigh (c.1587–1643), English naval officer and courtier
- William Feilding, 3rd Earl of Denbigh (1640–1685), grandson of 3rd Earl
- William Feilding (1669–1723), Member of Parliament for Castle Rising 1705–24
- William Feilding, Viscount Feilding (1760–1799), British army colonel and politician
- William Feilding, 7th Earl of Denbigh (1796–1865), son of William Robert Feilding, Viscount Feilding
- William Feilding (British Army officer, born 1836) (1836–1895), British soldier, son of 7th Earl Denbigh
- William Feilding, 10th Earl of Denbigh (1912–1966)
- William Feilding, 11th Earl of Denbigh (1943–1995), Earl of Denbigh

== See also ==
- William Fielding (disambiguation)
