= Alexander Feilding, 12th Earl of Denbigh =

English peer and landowner

The Right Honourable The Earl of Denbigh

Personal details
- Born: 4 November 1970 (age 55) Westminster, London, England
- Spouse: Suzanne Allen (m. 1996)
- Children: Peregrine Feilding, Viscount Feilding; Lady Hester Feilding; Hon. Orlando Feilding
- Parent(s): Rollo Feilding, 11th Earl of Denbigh; Judith Cooke

Alexander Stephen Rudolph Feilding, 12th Earl of Denbigh, 11th Earl of Desmond (born 4 November 1970), styled Viscount Feilding until 1995, is an English peer and landowner. He was a member of the House of Lords from 1995 to 1999 and is the Grand Carver of England.

== Life ==
Denbigh was born at Westminster Hospital, the only son of Rollo Feilding, 11th Earl of Denbigh and his wife, Caroline Judith "Judy" Cooke, only daughter of Lt.-Col. Geoffrey Cooke. He was educated at Stowe School.

He lives at and manages the family estate, Newnham Paddox House, at Monks Kirby near Rugby in Warwickshire. In 2014, the family put part of the estate lands up for sale to help cover death duties.

He is Patron of Offchurch Bury Polo Club in Warwickshire.

== Marriage and children ==
Lord Denbigh married, on 27 January 1996, Suzanne Jane Allen, daughter of Gregory Allen. They have three children:

- Peregrine Rudolph Henry Feilding, Viscount Feilding (born 19 February 2005), heir apparent
- Lady Hester Imelda Florence Feilding (born 5 July 2006)
- The Hon. Orlando Gregory Danger Feilding (born 12 January 2009)

== Ancestry ==
Ancestors of Alexander Feilding, 12th Earl of Denbigh

8. Rudolph Feilding, Viscount Feilding
4. William Feilding, 10th Earl of Denbigh
9. Agnes Imelda Mary Harding
2. Rollo Feilding, 11th Earl of Denbigh
10. William Edward Price
5. Verena Barbara Price
11. Mary Verena Dyer
1. Alexander Feilding, 12th Earl of Denbigh
12. Sidney FitzWyman Cooke
6. Geoffrey Cooke
13. Alice Eliza Bancroft
3. Caroline Judith Vivienne Bancroft
14. Ernest William Mynall Paine
7. Vivienne Charlton Paine
15. Clemence Kathleen Bussey

Peerage of England
Preceded by William Feilding	Earl of Denbigh; 1995–present	Incumbent
Peerage of Ireland
Preceded by William Feilding	Earl of Desmond; 1995–present	Incumbent
