= Basil Feilding =

Basil Feilding may refer to:

- Basil Feilding, 2nd Earl of Denbigh (c. 1608–1675)
- Basil Feilding, 4th Earl of Denbigh and 3rd Earl of Desmond (1668–1717)
- Basil Feilding, 6th Earl of Denbigh and 5th Earl of Desmond (1719–1800)
