= Rudolph Feilding, 8th Earl of Denbigh =

British peer (1823–1892)

The Right Honourable The Earl of Denbigh
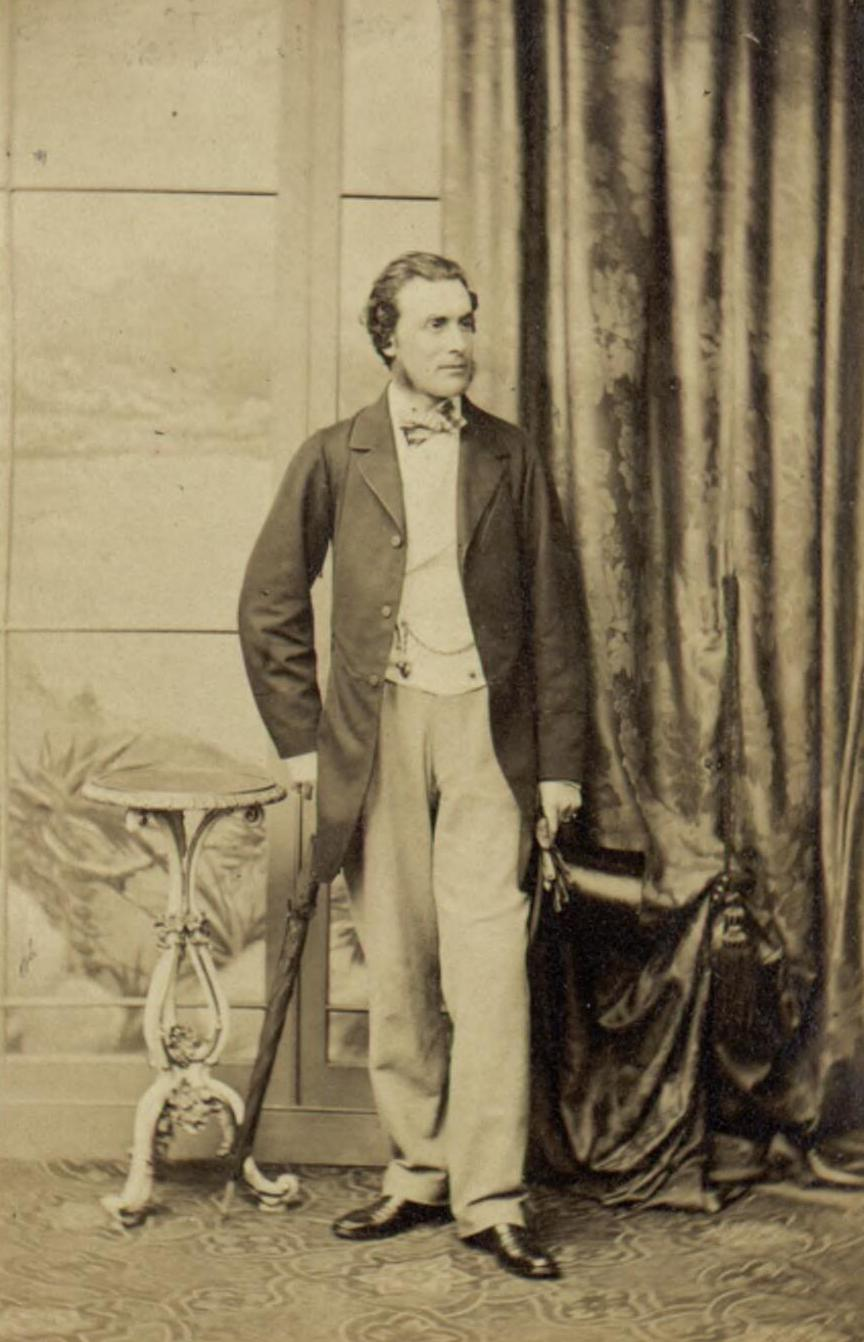
- Portrait from the Welsh Portrait Collection at the National Library of Wales

High Sheriff of Flintshire
- In office 1850–1851
- Preceded by: Philip Lake Godsal
- Succeeded by: Wilson Jones

Personal details
- Born: 9 April 1823
- Died: 10 March 1892 (aged 68)
- Spouse: Louisa Pennant (m. 1846; died 1853) Mary Berkeley (m. 1857)
- Parent(s): Basil Feilding, 7th Earl of Denbigh; Lady Mary Moreton

Military service
- Rank: Honorary Colonel
- Unit: 1st Flintshire Rifle Volunteers; Royal Welch Fusiliers

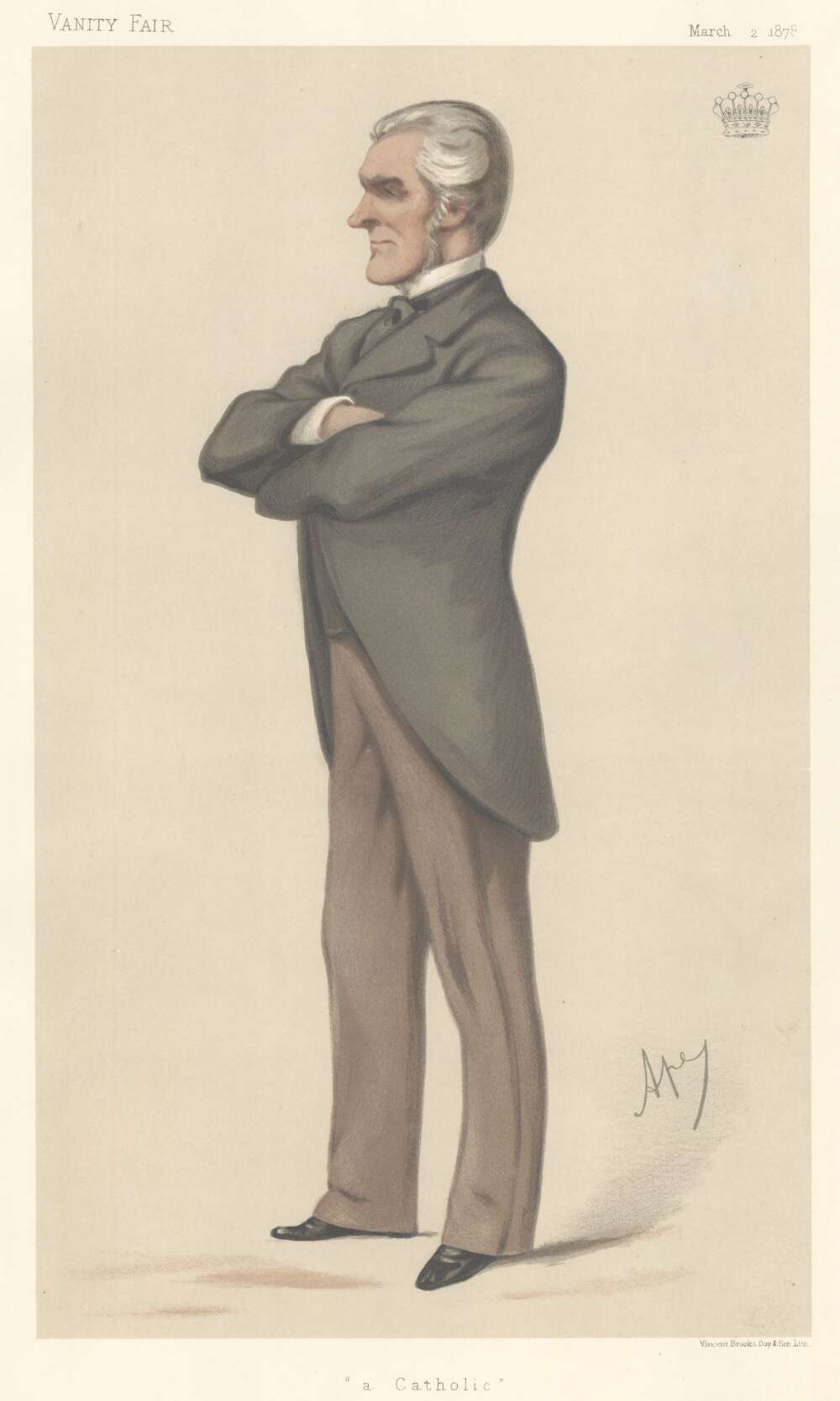
"a Catholic" The Earl of Denbigh as caricatured by Ape (Carlo Pellegrini) in Vanity Fair, March 1878

Rudolph William Basil Feilding, 8th Earl of Denbigh, 7th Earl of Desmond (9 April 1823 – 10 March 1892), styled as Viscount Feilding until 1865, was a British peer and noted Catholic convert, who founded the Franciscan friary at Pantasaph, North Wales.

== Early life ==
Feilding was born in 1823, the son of William Basil Feilding, 7th Earl of Denbigh, and his wife, Lady Mary Moreton, eldest daughter of Thomas Reynolds-Moreton, 1st Earl of Ducie. He was named after the claimed ancestor of the Feilding family, Rudolph I of Habsburg. Rollo and his twin sister Lady Mary Feilding were the first born children of their parents.

Feilding was educated at Eton College and Trinity College, Cambridge, where he was president of the University Pitt Club and took the degree of M.A. in 1844.

== Career ==
Feilding was received into the Catholic Church in 1850, and took an active part in many Catholic works of charity under Cardinal Wiseman. As Viscount Feilding he was appointed honorary treasurer, jointly with Viscount Campden and Archibald J. Dunn, of the Peter's Pence Association.

In 1850, Feilding was appointed High Sheriff of Flintshire.

On 29 June 1860, Feilding raised the 4th (Holywell) Flintshire Rifle Volunteer Corps as captain-commandant. After the unit was incorporated into the 1st Administrative Battalion, Flintshire Rifle Volunteer Corps, he commanded that from 1862 with the rank of major. On 2 July 1873, he became the battalion's honorary colonel, and continued in that role with its successor, the 2nd Volunteer Battalion, Royal Welch Fusiliers.

== Family ==
Feilding married, firstly, Louisa Pennant, great-granddaughter of the Welsh naturalist and travel writer Thomas Pennant. She died of consumption in 1853, without issue. He married, secondly, Mary Berkeley, daughter of Robert Berkeley, Esq. of Spetchley, Worcestershire. They had seven children, including:

- Rudolph Feilding, 9th Earl of Denbigh (26 May 1859 –25 November 1939), who succeeded
- Everard Feilding (6 March 1867 – 8 February 1936), Hon. Sec. of the Society for Psychical Research
- Lady Winefride Mary Elizabeth Feilding (24 September 1868 – 24 February 1959), who married Gervase Elwes on 11 May 1889

After his death in 1892, he was interred with his first wife Louisa at Pantasaph, dressed in the habit of the Third Order of St Francis, of which he was a member.

== Ancestry ==
Ancestors of Rudolph Feilding, 8th Earl of Denbigh

16. William Feilding, 5th Earl of Denbigh
8. Basil Feilding, 6th Earl of Denbigh
17. Isabella Haeck de Jong
4. William Feilding, Viscount Feilding
18. Sir John Cotton, 6th Baronet
9. Mary Cotton
19. Jane Burdett
2. William Basil Percy Feilding, 7th Earl of Denbigh
10. Thomas Jelf Powys
5. Anne Catherine Powys
11. Anne Lissey Cooper
1. Rollo Feilding, 8th Earl of Denbigh
12. Francis Reynolds-Moreton, 3rd Baron Ducie
6. Thomas Reynolds-Moreton, 1st Earl of Ducie
13. Mary Provis
3. Lady Mary Elizabeth Moreton
14. Henry Herbert, 1st Earl of Carnarvon
7. Lady Frances Herbert
30. Charles Wyndham, 2nd Earl of Egremont
15. Lady Elizabeth Wyndham
31. Hon. Alicia Maria Carpenter

Notes:

Peerage of England
Preceded by William Basil Percy Feilding	Earl of Denbigh; 1865–1892	Succeeded by Rudolph Robert Basil Aloysius Augustine Feilding
Peerage of Ireland
Preceded by William Basil Percy Feilding	Earl of Desmond; 1865–1892	Succeeded by Rudolph Robert Basil Aloysius Augustine Feilding
