= Frances Finch, Countess of Winchilsea and Nottingham =

English aristocrat and social reformer

- Born: Lady Frances Juliana Feilding; 20 January 1709
- Died: 27 September 1734 (aged 25); Rotherham, Yorkshire
- Burial place: Ravenstone, Buckinghamshire
- Spouse: Daniel Finch, 8th Earl of Winchilsea (m. 1729)
- Children: Lady Charlotte Finch (1731–1796)
- Parents: Basil Feilding, 4th Earl of Denbigh (father); Hester Firebrace (mother)

Frances Juliana Finch, Countess of Winchilsea and Nottingham (20 January 1709 – 3 October 1734) was an English aristocrat and social reformer.

== Biography ==
Lady Frances was the daughter of Basil Feilding, 4th Earl of Denbigh, 3rd Earl of Desmond, and his wife, Hester, daughter of Sir Basil Firebrace, 1st Baronet. She was baptised in the Parish of St Gyles, London. She had five sisters and four brothers, including William Feilding, 5th Earl of Denbigh.

She married Daniel Finch, 8th Earl of Winchilsea in December 1729. They had one daughter, Lady Charlotte Finch (1731–1796).

Few details of her life are known; however, she was notable in being one of the aristocratic women who were early supporters of Thomas Coram's efforts to establish a Foundling Hospital. She signed the Ladies' Petition which was delivered to King George II to support the establishment of the Hospital on 25 April 1730, and she is the signatory of whom least is known. This group of women not only lent their prestige and respectability to the endeavour, they made it 'one of the most fashionable charities of the day'. As part of an exhibition celebrating the role of women in the establishment and administration of the Hospital, called Ladies of Quality and Distinction, the Foundling Museum held an exhibition in 2018 which included a family portrait of Frances.

Through her marriage she was the aunt of another signatory, Selina Hastings, Countess of Huntingdon.

The cause of her death is not known. She is buried at her husband's family seat of Ravenstone, Buckinghamshire.
