= Earl of Desmond =

Title of Irish nobility granted by the English Monarch

Earldom of Desmond held with Earldom of Denbigh
- Arms of the Fitzgerald Earls of Desmond (for arms of the current Earl, see Earl of Denbigh)
- Creation date: 1329 (1st creation); 1600 (2nd creation); 1619 (3rd creation); 1622/1628 (4th creation)
- Created by: Edward III (1st creation); Elizabeth I (2nd creation); James VI and I (3rd creation and 4th creation (right on reversion)); Charles I (4th creation - confirmation of possession)
- Peerage: Peerage of Ireland
- First holder: Maurice FitzGerald, 1st Earl of Desmond
- Present holder: Alexander Feilding, 12th Earl of Denbigh, 11th Earl of Desmond (4th creation)
- Heir apparent: Peregrine Feilding, Viscount Feilding
- Subsidiary titles: Viscount Feilding; Viscount Callan; Baron Feilding of Newnham Paddox; Baron St Liz; Baron Fielding of Lecaghe
- Extinction date: 1582 (first creation); 1601 (second creation); 1628 (third creation)
- Seat: Newnham Paddox House
- Motto: Crescit sub pondere virtus (Virtue increaseth under oppression)

Earl of Desmond (Irish: Iarla Dheasumhan meaning earl of South Munster) is a title of nobility created by the English monarch in the peerage of Ireland. The title has been created four times. It was first awarded in 1329 to Maurice FitzGerald, 4th Baron Desmond, a Hiberno-Norman lord in Southwest Ireland, and it was held by his descendants until 1583 when they rose against the English crown in the Desmond Rebellions. Following two short-lived recreations of the title in the early 1600s, the title has been held since 1628 by the Feilding family of Warwickshire, England. The current holder is Alexander Feilding, 12th Earl of Denbigh and 11th Earl of Desmond (4th creation). The earldom held by the Fitzgerald family historically comprised what is now the entirety of County Limerick with large swathes of County Cork, County Kerry and County Waterford also being included. It bordered the Kingdom of Desmond, Kingdom of Thomond and the Earldom of Ormond

== Summary of history of the title ==
The Munster Desmonds were a cadet (junior) branch of the powerful FitzGerald dynasty who came to Ireland from Wales as part of the 12th century Anglo-Norman invasion. Over the following centuries, the FitzGeralds famously assimilated themselves in Ireland, and, in the late 16th century Tudor conquest of Ireland, they took arms against the Protestant English Crown in the Desmond Rebellions. As a result, the family's estates were confiscated, the earl beheaded and the title suppressed.

The English government imprisoned James FitzGerald, the eldest son of the last earl, in the Tower of London for decades. However, in 1600, during the Nine Years War, in an attempt to pacify the people of Munster, James was freed and title recreated for him though without right of inheritance. The people of Munster refused to accept the new Earl - a Protestant - and James died a year later in obscurity.

The third creation was in 1619 for Richard Preston, a favourite of James I: Preston had married the daughter and heiress of the 10th Earl of Ormond, neighbour, relative and enemy of the Munster Desmonds. Preston died without male heir and - before Preston's death - James I decided the Desmond title should be subsequently awarded to George Feilding, a nephew of another of the King's favourites. The idea was that George would marry Preston's daughter Elizabeth and thereby inherit lands in Ireland.

Charles I confirmed George Feilding as Earl of Desmond on Preston's death in 1628 (the fourth creation) but George never got to marry the independent-minded Elizabeth. Since 1675 the title, shorn of its traditional Irish estate, has been held by Feilding's descendants as a secondary title to that of the Earl of Denbigh.

== The FitzGerald Barons and Earls of Desmond ==
=== The Territory of Desmond ===
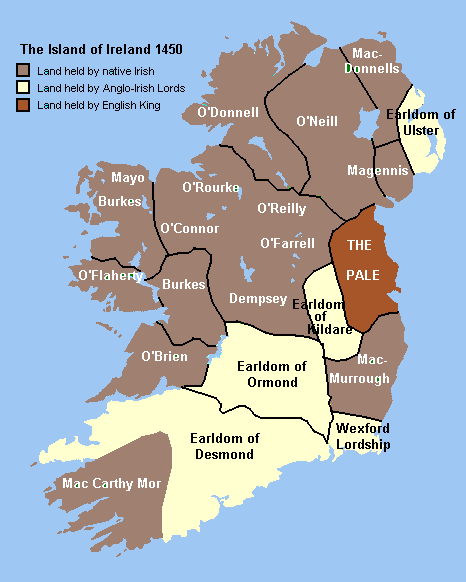
Ireland in 1450 showing the FitzGerald Earldom of Desmond. The westernmost part of the former Gaelic Kingdom of Desmond continued as a semi- independent Irish kingdom.

Desmond (Irish: Deasmhumhain, meaning 'South Munster') was a historic kingdom in southwestern Ireland, founded in 1118. It comprised all of what is now County Cork and most of County Kerry. The eastern half of Desmond was conquered by the Anglo-Normans and became the Earldom of Desmond, but the western half of Desmond lived on as a semi-independent Gaelic kingdom until 1596.

=== Barony of Desmond ===
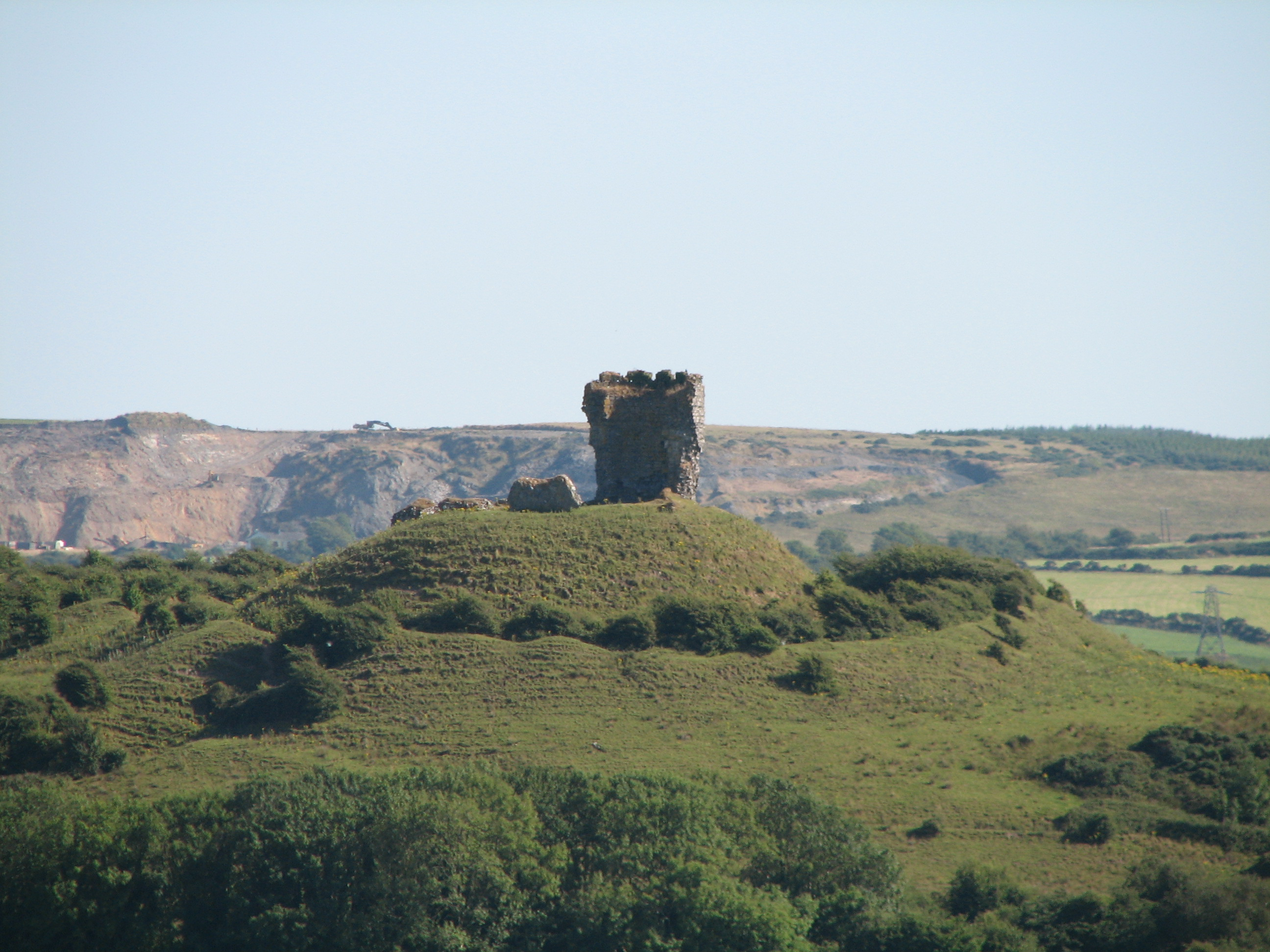
Shanid Castle, from which the Desmond Geraldines derived their motto, "Shanid abu"

The House of Desmond was a branch of the FitzGerald Dynasty (Geraldines) in Ireland which had been founded by Maurice FitzGerald, Lord of Lanstephan in Wales ( c.1105 – c.1176). Maurice was of Anglo-Norman and Welsh descent.

Though the House of Desmond branch was founded by the eldest of Maurice FitzGeralds's sons, Thomas FitzMaurice, Lord OConnello, it became the cadet or junior branch of the family: the senior branch, the House of Kildare, was founded by Thomas's younger brother Gerald, 1st Lord of Offally.

Thomas, Lord OConello was a key supporter of the Lord of Pembroke known as ("Strongbow") in his 1169 invasion of Ireland. Thomas's son, John FitzThomas, became the first Baron Desmond upon receiving, for his homage and service, a grant in 1259 of the lands of Decies (today's County Waterford) and Desmond from Prince Edward of England. Before passing to Edward, these lands had been held by Thomas FitzAnthony, the father of John's wife Margery FitzAnthony.

=== Earl of Desmond: first creation ===
The title Earl of Desmond was first created for Maurice FitzGerald, 4th Baron Desmond in about 1329.

Gerald FitzGerald, 3rd Earl of Desmond, married Eleanor Butler. Through her, John FitzGerald, 4th Earl of Desmond and all subsequent Geraldine earls of Desmond could trace descent through Eleanor de Bohun to Elizabeth of Rhuddlan, daughter of King Edward I of the House of Plantagenet by his queen, Eleanor of Castile of the House of Burgundy.

Over time, according to English sources, the FitzGerald family became highly assimilated to the local Irish culture. The final Earl of Desmond of this creation was Gerald FitzGerald, the 14th Earl. The FitzGeralds and Fitzmaurices had resisted the Protestant Reformation of King Henry VIII and, after the failure of the first and second Desmond Rebellions, the 14th Earl was defeated and killed by forces loyal to Queen Elizabeth I on 11 November 1583. His title, along with the enormous estates of his family, were forfeit to the English Crown.

==== Numbering of Earls of the first creation ====
Authors have numbered the earls of the first creation from 1 to 14, 1 to 15, or 1 to 16, depending on whether Nicholas, an "idiot", is included as 3rd Earl, and whether John, the de facto 12th Earl (died 1536) and James FitzGerald, de jure 12th Earl of Desmond (died 1540), are both numbered 12 or are numbered 12 and 13. Wikipedia numbers the earls 1 to 14 omitting the "idiot" and numbering John de facto and James de jure both as 12, following Cokayne (1916) and the Oxford Dictionary of National Biography (2004). Burke (1866), Webb (1878) and the Dictionary of national Biography (1889) admit 15, and Bagwell (1885) 16 earls of the first creation.

=== Earl of Desmond: Second Creation ===
The second creation was in 1600 for James FitzGerald the "Tower Earl", son of the last (14th Earl) of the first creation. He spent much of his life in captivity in the Tower of London, and was obliged to convert to Protestantism. He was temporarily, but unsuccessfully, restored to the earldom in 1600–01 by the English in an attempt to pacify Munster during the Nine Years War, and to combat rise of the Súgán (pretender, see below) Earl but the people rejected the new Protestant Earl. James was not restored to the lands associated with the title, and was only given the right to the title of Earl of Desmond for life; he was also created Baron Inchiquin with the right to pass that title to his successors, but he did not have heirs and died in obscurity in 1601.

=== Pretenders to the title ===
James FitzThomas FitzGerald, the Súgán (Irish: straw, i.e. pretender) Earl, attempted, but failed, to regain the title during the Nine Years War. James's claim was based on the fact he was the eldest grandson of the 13th Earl, but he was illegitimate by descent. The 13th Earl's first marriage had to have been to his own great-niece: the marriage had been declared invalid due to consanguinity and James's father, the child of the union, had been declared illegitimate (the 14th Earl was the child of a second, legitimate marriage).

James had not joined the rebellion of the 14th Earl and following the 14th Earl's death, James lobbied the English - at first with some success - to be restored to the title. When that failed in 1598 he joined the rebellion and assumed the title of Earl of Desmond, leading eight thousand clansmen. He was captured in 1601 and is believed to have died in the Tower of London in 1608.

James's younger brother John had joined him in rebellion but escaped to Spain. Following the Súgán Earl's death John and his son Gerald continued the pretence to the title. John died in Barcelona and Gerald - Conde de Desmond in Spanish - entered the service of the Emperor Ferdinand, and was killed in 1632. As Gerald left no issue, with him ended the male heirs of the four eldest sons of Thomas FitzGerald, 7th Earl of Desmond: this was the effective extinction of the line of the Fitzgerald House of Desmond.

=== Desmond Geraldine arms and motto ===
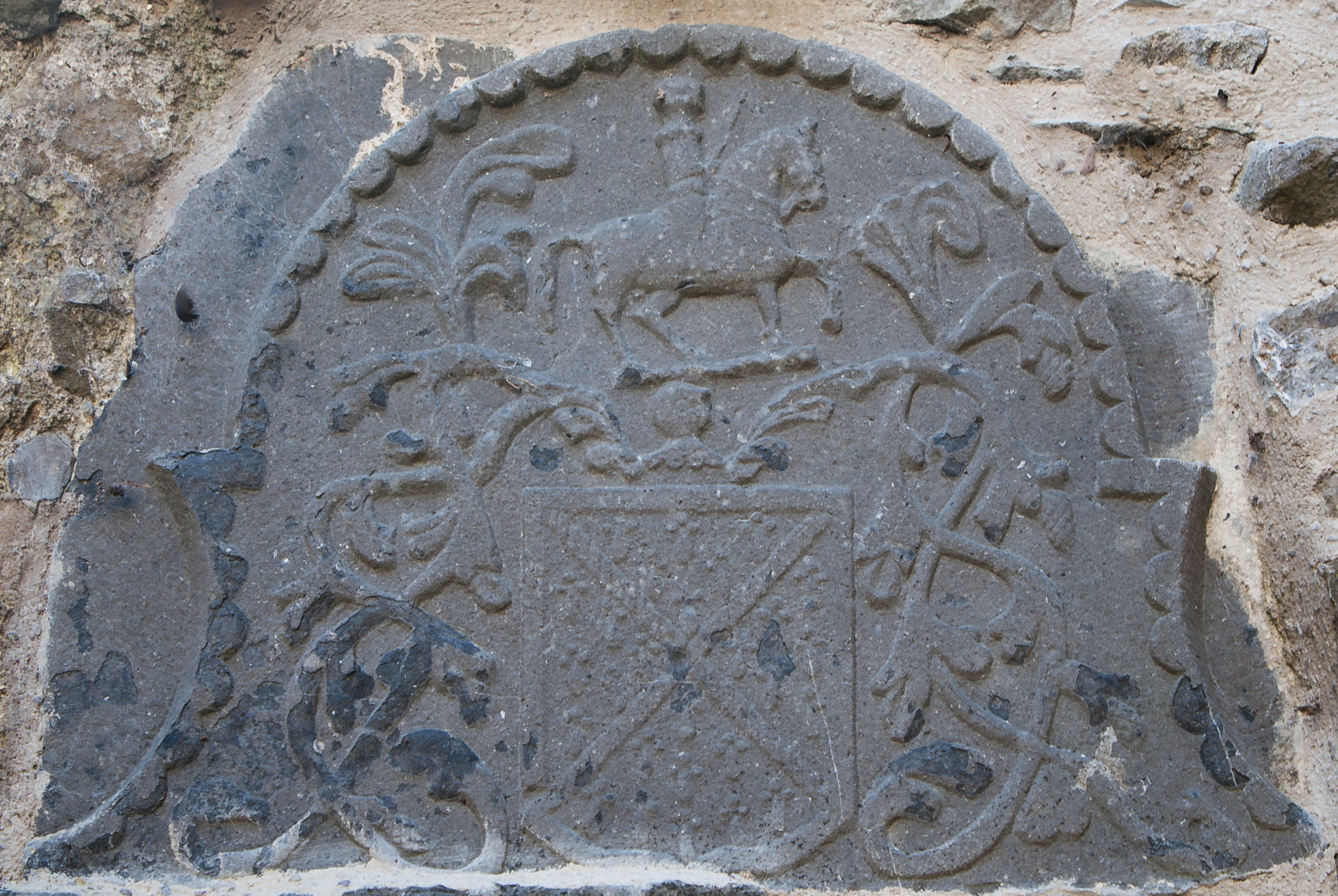
Relief of coat of arms of the FitzGerald of Desmond (showing the saltire) in Buttevant Friary

The coat of arms of the Geraldine Earls of Desmond, blazoned ermine a saltire gules, where the ermine tincture is a mark of cadency relative to the senior Kildare branch of the Geraldines (whose arms are more simply blazoned "argent, a saltire gules"). The crest shows a man in armour on horseback, facing to the right.

The motto appearing beneath the Desmond arms was "Shanid abu" (Shanid to victory) a reference to the Desmond stronghold of Shanid Castle.

== Earl of Desmond: third and fourth creation ==
The third creation was in 1619 for Richard Preston, 1st Lord Dingwall, who was also created Baron Dunmore.

The fourth creation happened while Preston was still alive, in 1622 for George Feilding, 1st Viscount Callan, second son of the Earl of Denbigh and nephew of James I's favourite, George Villiers. The eight-year-old Feilding was given the right to the title Earl of Desmond as and when Preston died without a male heir. Preston had also been a favourite of James I; he had a daughter who, the plan was, George Feilding would marry, but this did not happen. In 1628 Preston died and George was made Earl of Desmond by Charles I (Preston's Scottish Lordship of Dingwall passed to his daughter Elizabeth, the Duchess of Ormond).

George Feilding's eldest son, the second Earl of Desmond, also inherited the title of third Earl of Denbigh after his uncle, the second Earl of Denbigh, died childless. The title Earl of Desmond has descended subsequently with the title Earl of Denbigh and the current holder is the twelfth Earl of Denbigh and eleventh Earl of Desmond.

== List of Barons and Earls of Desmond ==
=== Barons Desmond (1259) ===
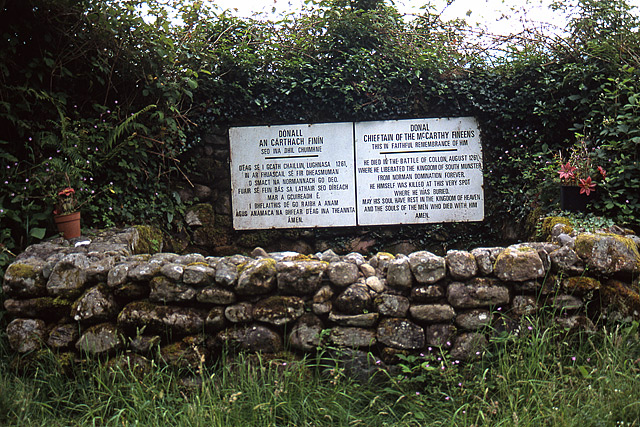
A memorial at the site of the Battle of Callann, where John FitzThomas FitzGerald, 1st Baron Desmond and his eldest son fell in 1261 while fighting against Fínghin Mac Carthaigh, King of Desmond.

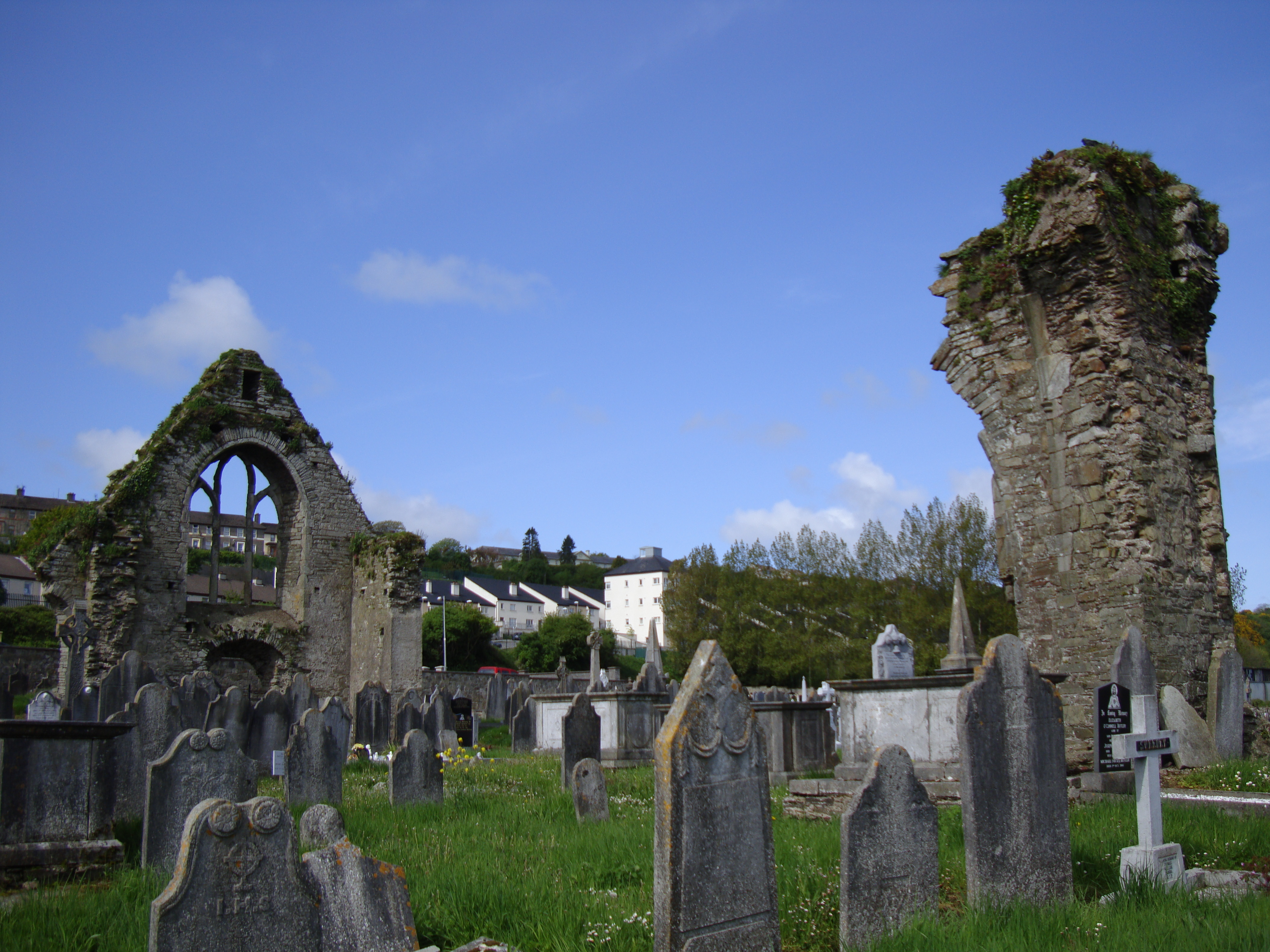
Dominican Priory of North Abbey, Youghal, founded in 1268 by Thomas FitzMaurice FitzGerald, 2nd Baron Desmond

- John FitzThomas FitzGerald, 1st Baron Desmond (died 1261) (son of Thomas FitzMaurice FitzGerald)
- Thomas FitzMaurice FitzGerald, 2nd Baron Desmond (died 1298) (grandson of preceding)
- Thomas FitzThomas FitzGerald, 3rd Baron Desmond (1290–1307) (son of preceding)
- Maurice FitzThomas FitzGerald, 4th Baron Desmond (died 1356) (brother of preceding; created Earl of Desmond in 1329)

=== Earls of Desmond, first creation (1329) ===
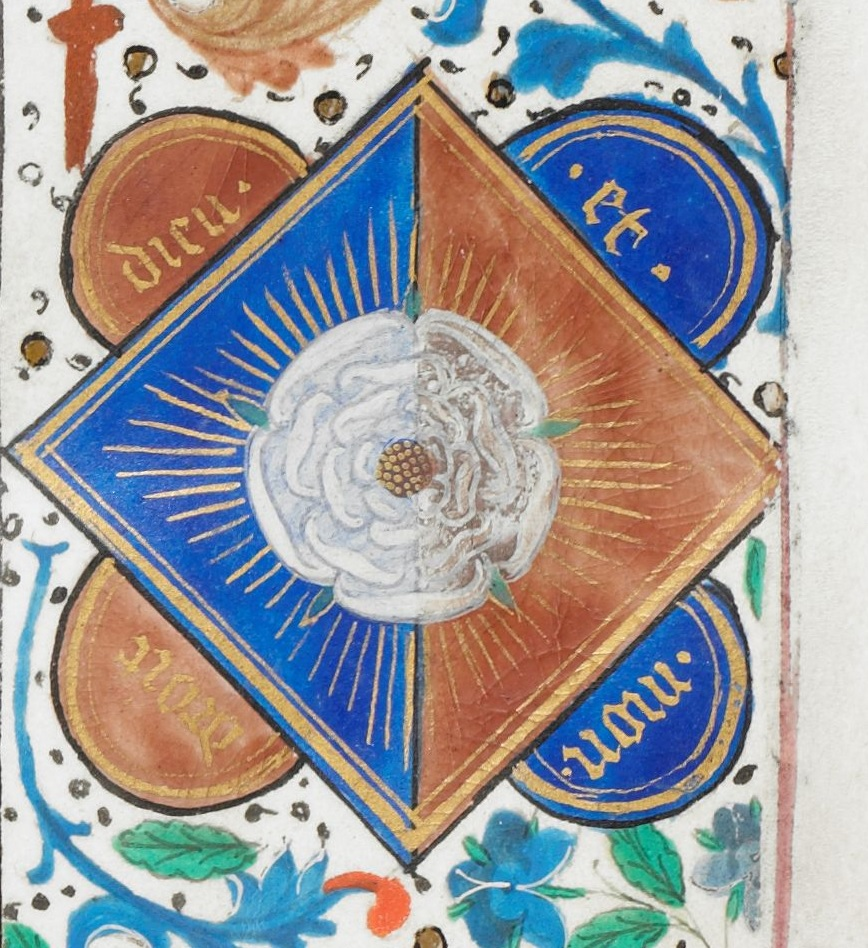
White Rose of York, from a manuscript of King Edward IV. In 1462, Thomas FitzGerald, 7th Earl of Desmond, won a Yorkist victory in the Battle of Piltown, the only battle of the Wars of the Roses fought in Ireland.

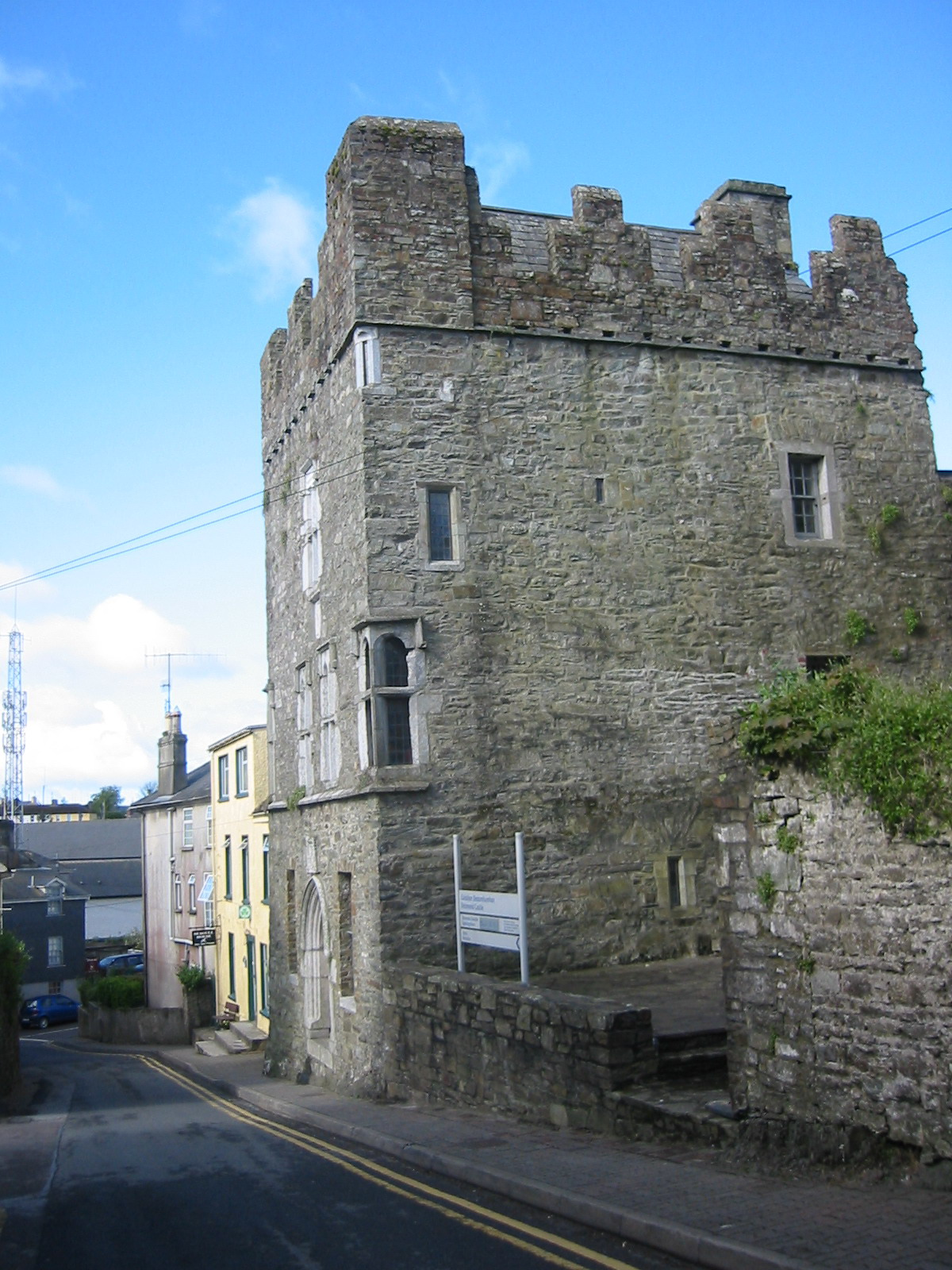
Desmond Castle, built in Kinsale about 1500 by Maurice FitzGerald, 9th Earl of Desmond.

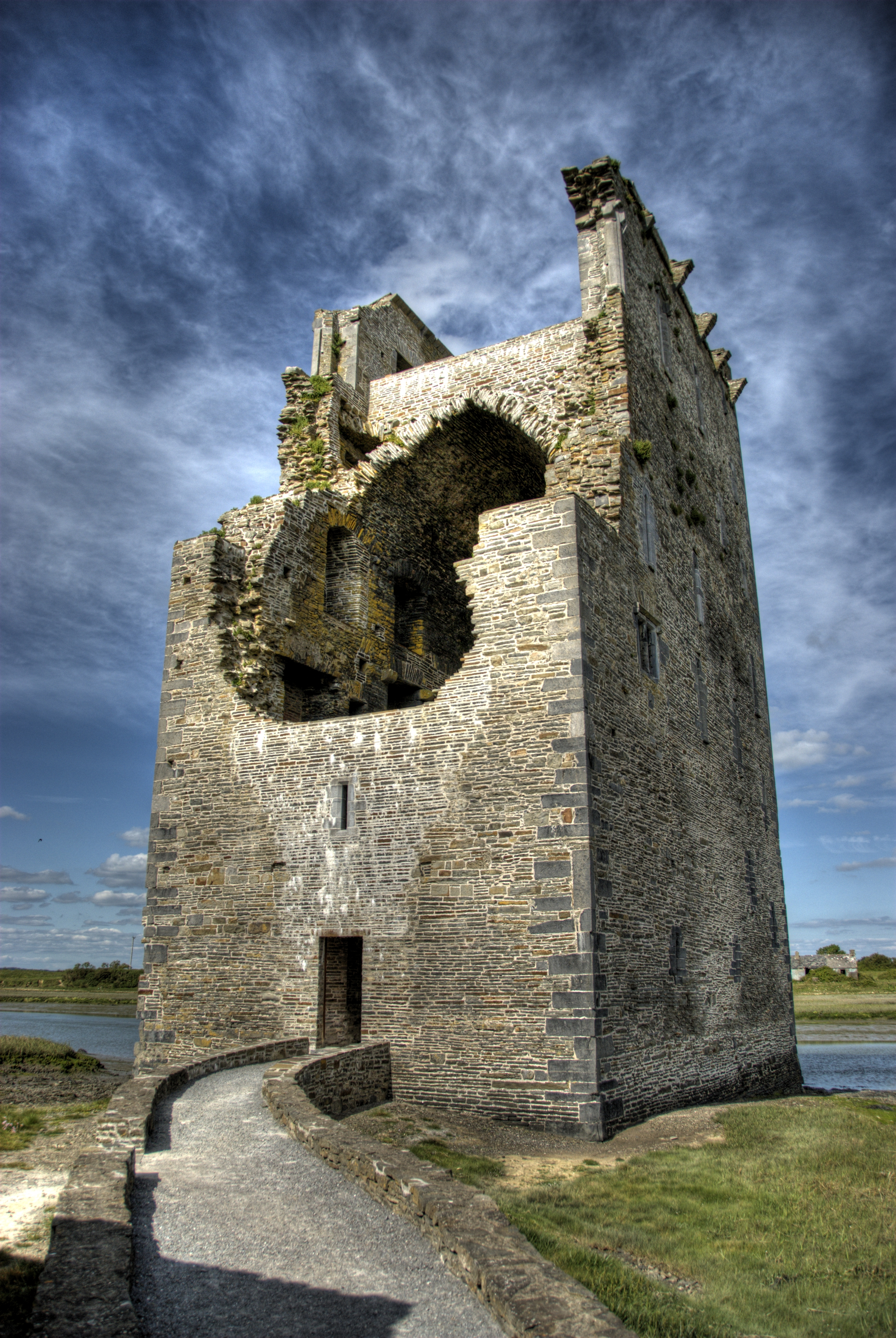
Carrigafoyle Castle, a Geraldine stronghold during the Second Desmond Rebellion, captured by the English in 1580

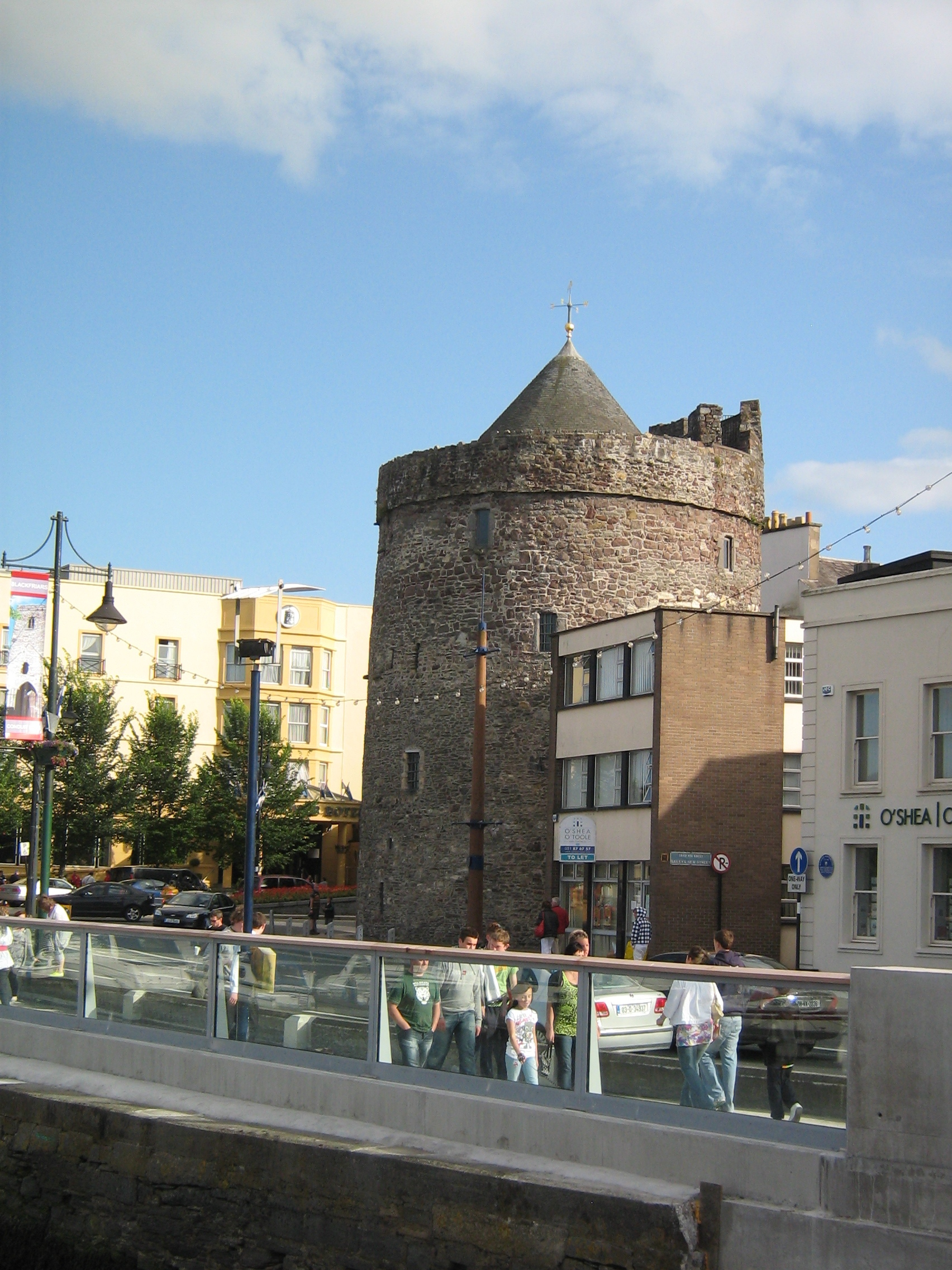
The cannons of Reginald's Tower helped repel the forces of Perkin Warbeck and Maurice FitzGerald, 9th Earl of Desmond from Waterford in 1495.

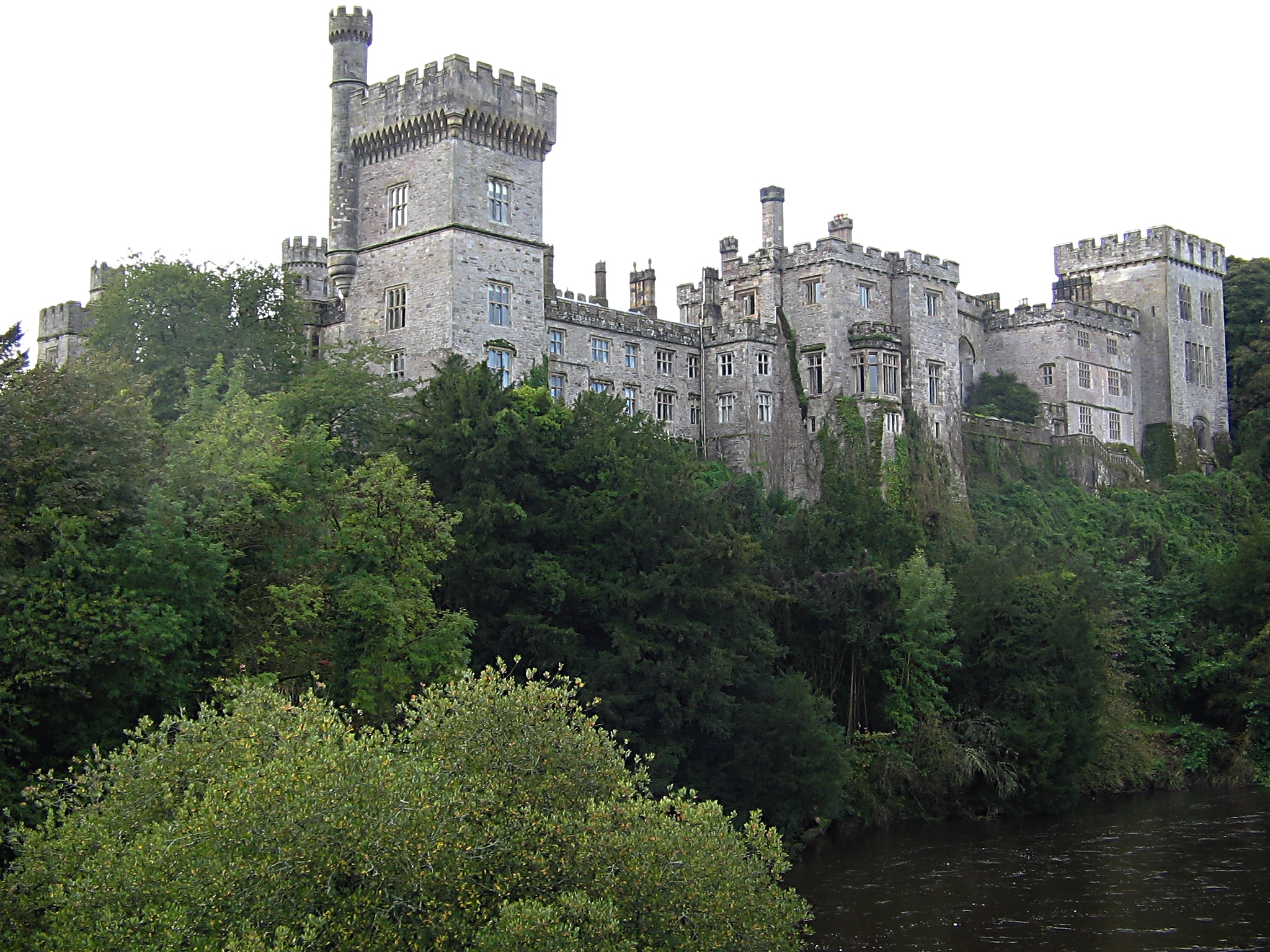
Lismore Castle, where the Book of Lismore, owned by Catherine FitzGerald, was discovered.

- Maurice FitzGerald, 1st Earl of Desmond (died 1356) (new creation)
- Maurice FitzGerald, 2nd Earl of Desmond (1336–1358) (son of preceding)
- Gerald FitzGerald, 3rd Earl of Desmond (died 1398) (half-brother of preceding)
- John FitzGerald, 4th Earl of Desmond (died 1399) (son of preceding)
- Thomas FitzGerald, 5th Earl of Desmond (c. 1386–1420) (son of preceding)
- James FitzGerald, 6th Earl of Desmond (died 1463) (the "Usurper," paternal uncle of preceding)
- Thomas FitzGerald, 7th Earl of Desmond (died 1468) (son of preceding)
- James FitzGerald, 8th Earl of Desmond (1459–1487) (son of preceding)
- Maurice FitzGerald, 9th Earl of Desmond (died 1520) (brother of preceding)
- James FitzGerald, 10th Earl of Desmond (died 1529) (son of preceding)
- Thomas FitzGerald, 11th Earl of Desmond (1454–1534) (paternal uncle of preceding)
- John FitzGerald, de facto 12th Earl of Desmond (died 1536) (brother of preceding, paternal granduncle of James FitzGerald, de jure 12th Earl of Desmond)
- James FitzGerald, de jure 12th Earl of Desmond (died 1540) (grandson of Thomas FitzGerald, 11th Earl of Desmond, grandnephew of John FitzGerald, de facto 12th Earl of Desmond)
- James FitzGerald, 13th Earl of Desmond (died 1558) (son of the de facto 12th Earl and legitimate heir of the de jure 12th Earl.
- Gerald FitzGerald, 14th Earl of Desmond (c. 1533 – 1583) (son of preceding; forfeit 1582)

=== Pretenders to the first creation (1598-1632) ===
- James FitzThomas FitzGerald, the Súgán Earl, died in Tower of London c. 1607 (illegitimate grandson of 13th Earl)
- John FitzThomas FitzGerald - brother of the Súgán Earl, died Barcelona (brother of preceding)
- Gerald FitzJohn FitzGerald - son of John, known as Conde de Desmond, died in service of the King of Spain, 1632 (son of preceding - no heirs)

=== Earls of Desmond, second creation (1600) ===
- James FitzGerald, Earl of Desmond (1571–1601) The Tower Earl. (son of the 14th Earl). Title created as a life peerage.

=== Earls of Desmond, third creation (1619) ===
- Richard Preston, 1st Earl of Desmond (died 1628) married the great-granddaughter of 10th Earl of the first creation. (extinct)

=== Earls of Desmond, fourth creation (1622/28) ===
- George Feilding, 1st Earl of Desmond (died 1665) granted right to title on reversion, 1622; possession of title, 1628.
- William Feilding, 2nd Earl of Desmond (died 1685) inherited superior title of Earl of Denbigh in 1675.

For subsequent Earls of Desmond (title held with the title Earl of Denbigh), see List of Earls of Denbigh and Earls of Desmond.

== Family tree ==
Fitzmaurice family tree and the FitzGerald dynasty
Note that there are differing accounts as to which FitzMaurice was the 1st Baron Kerry. The Complete Peerage starts the numbering at Maurice Fitzthomas. Irish pedigrees starts the numbering at Thomas Fitzmaurice.

Maurice FitzGerald "Maurice de Windsor" c. 1105–c. 1176; Lord of Llanstephan, Baron of Naas, Lord of Maynooth
Robert FitzMaurice; Details unknown	Thomas FitzMaurice FitzGerald c. 1145–1213; Lord OConnello	Gerald FitzMaurice c. 1150–1203; 1st Baron of Offaly
Baron Kerry and Lixnaw, 1223	See Baron of Offaly
Thomas Fitzmaurice c. 1220–1280; 1st Baron Kerry and Lixnaw; Lord OConnello	John FitzThomas d. 1261; 1st Baron Desmond
Maurice Fitzthomas d. c. 1260; 2nd Baron Kerry and Lixnaw	Maurice FitzJohn FitzGerald d. 1261
Nicholas Fitzthomas d. 1324; 3rd Baron Kerry and Lixnaw	Thomas Fitzmaurice FitzGerald d. 1298; 2nd Baron Desmond
Earl of Desmond (1st creation), 1329
Maurice Fitzthomas d. 1339; 4th Baron Kerry and Lixnaw	John Fitzthomas d. 1348; 5th Baron Kerry and Lixnaw	Aveline (Eleanor)	Maurice FitzThomas FitzGerald d. 1358; 1st Earl of Desmond, 4th Baron Desmond	Thomas FitzThomas FitzGerald; 1290–1307; 3rd Baron Desmond
Maurice FitzJohn Fitzmaurice d. 1398; 6th Baron Kerry and Lixnaw	Maurice FitzMaurice FitzGerald "Maurice Óg"; 1335–1398; 2nd Earl of Desmond, 5th Baron Desmond	Gerald FitzGerald; 1335–1398; 3rd Earl of Desmond, 6th Baron Desmond
Patrick FitzMaurice FitzJohn d. c. 1410; 7th Baron Kerry and Lixnaw	John FitzGerald d. 1399; 4th Earl of Desmond, 7th Baron Desmond	James FitzGerald d. 1462; 6th Earl of Desmond, 9th Baron Desmond
Thomas FitzMaurice d. 1469; 8th Baron Kerry and Lixnaw	Thomas FitzGerald c. 1386–1420; 5th Earl of Desmond, 8th Baron Desmond	Thomas FitzJames FitzGerald "the Great Earl" d. c. 1467/68; 7th Earl of Desmond, 10th Baron Desmond
Edmond FitzMaurice d. 1541; 9th Baron Kerry and Lixnaw	James fitz Thomas FitzGerald; 1459–1487; 8th Earl of Desmond, 11th Baron Desmond	Maurice fitz Thomas FitzGerald d. 1520; 9th (or 10th) Earl of Desmond, 12th Baron Desmond	Thomas fitz Thomas FitzGerald; 1454–1534; 11th (or 12th) Earl of Desmond, 14th Baron Desmond	John fitz Thomas FitzGerald d. 1536; 12th Earl of Desmond de facto, 15th Baron Desmond de facto
Thomas FitzMaurice; Details unknown	James fitz Maurice FitzGerald d. 1529; 10th (or 11th) Earl of Desmond, 13th Baron Desmond	Maurice fitz Thomas FitzGerald d. 1529	James fitz John FitzGerald d. 1558; 13th (or 14th) Earl of Desmond, 16th Baron Desmond
Edmond FitzMaurice d. 1543; 10th Baron Kerry and Lixnaw	Joan Fitzgerald d. 1565	James fitz Maurice FitzGerald ("Court Page") d. 1540; 12th (or 13th) Earl of Desmond de jure, 15th Baron Desmond de jure
Barony of Kerry and Lixnaw resigned, 1529
Baron Odorney and Viscount Kilmaule, 1537
Edmond FitzMaurice d. 1541; 11th Baron Kerry and Lixnaw	Patrick FitzMaurice d. 1547; 12th Baron Kerry and Lixnaw	Gerard FitzMaurice d. 1550; 15th Baron Kerry and Lixnaw	Thomas Fitzmaurice; 1502–1590; 16th Baron Kerry and Lixnaw	Margaret "the Fair"	Thomas Butler ("Black Tom") c. 1531–1614; Earl of Ormond and Earl of Ossory	Gerald FitzGerald ("Rebel Earl") c. 1533–1583; 14th (or 15th or 16th) Earl of Desmond, 17th Baron Desmond
Barony of Odorney and viscountcy of Kilmaule extinct, 1541	Earldom of Desmond (1st creation) attainted, 1582
Lord Dingwall (2nd creation), 1609; Earl of Desmond (3rd creation) and Baron Dunmore, 1619	Earl of Desmond (2nd creation for life), 1600
Thomas FitzMaurice d. 1549; 13th Baron Kerry and Lixnaw	Edmond FitzMaurice d. 1549; 14th Baron Kerry and Lixnaw	Patrick Fitzmaurice; 1551?–1600; 17th Baron Kerry and Lixnaw	Richard Preston d. 1628; Earl of Desmond and Baron Dunmore, 1st Lord Dingwall	Elizabeth (Butler) Preston c. 1585–1628	James FitzGerald ("Tower Earl"); 1571–1601; Earl of Desmond
Viscount Feilding and Baron Feilding, 1620; Earl of Denbigh, 1622	Earldom of Desmond (3rd creation) and barony of Dunmore extinct, 1628	Earldom of Desmond (2nd creation) extinct, 1601
Thomas Fitzmaurice; 1574–1630; 18th Baron Kerry	William Feilding c. 1587–1643; 1st Earl of Denbigh, etc.
Baron St. Liz, 1664	Viscount Callan and Baron Feilding of Lecagh, 1622; Earl of Desmond (4th creation) on reversion, 1628
Patrick FitzMaurice; 1595–1661; 19th Baron Kerry	Basil Feilding c. 1608–1675; 2nd Earl Denbigh, etc., 1st Baron St. Liz	George Feilding c. 1614–1665; 1st Earl of Desmond, etc.	Earldom of Desmond created in expectation of marriage, which did not happen	Elizabeth (Preston) Butler; 1615–1684; 2nd Lady Dingwall suo jure
William FitzMaurice; 1633–1697; 20th Baron Kerry	William Feilding; 1640–1685; 3rd Earl Denbigh, etc. 2nd Earl of Desmond, etc., 2nd Baron St. Liz	Thomas Butler; 1634–1680; Earl of Ossory
Earl of Kerry, 1753
Thomas FitzMaurice; 1668–1741; 1st Earl of Kerry, 21st Baron Kerry	Basil Feilding; 1668–1717; 4th Earl Denbigh, etc. 3rd Earl of Desmond, etc., 3rd Baron St. Liz	James Butler; 1665–1745; Duke of Ormonde, Earl of Ossory, 3rd Lord Dingwall
Lordship of Dingwall (2nd creation) forfeit, 1715
Viscount FitzMaurice and Baron Dunkeron, 1751; Earl of Shelburne (2nd creation), 1753; Baron Wycombe, 1760
William FitzMaurice; 1694–1747; 2nd Earl of Kerry, 22nd Baron Kerry	John Petty-Fitzmaurice; 1706–1761; 1st Earl of Shelburne, etc.	Baron Nairne	William Feilding; 1697–1775; 5th Earl Denbigh, etc. 4th Earl of Desmond, etc., 4th Baron St. Liz
Marquess of Lansdowne, Earl of Wycombe, and Viscount Calne and Calston, 1784	Baron Keith (1st creation: Ireland), 1797; Baron Keith (2nd creation: UK), 1801; Baron Keith (3rd creation: UK), 1803; Viscount Keith (UK), 1814
Francis Thomas-Fitzmaurice; 1740–1818; 3rd Earl of Kerry, 23rd Baron Kerry	William Petty-Fitzmaurice; 1737–1805; 1st Marquess of Lansdowne, etc., 2nd Earl of Shelburne, etc.	Jane Mercer	George Keith Elphinstone; 1746–1823; Viscount Keith, Baron Keith (Ire, UK, UK)	Basil Feilding; 1719–1800; 6th Earl Denbigh, etc. 5th Earl of Desmond, etc., 5th Baron St. Liz
Viscountcy of Keith and Barony of Keith (1st creation) extinct, 1801
John Henry Petty; 1765–1809; 2nd Marquess of Lansdowne, etc., 3rd Earl of Shelburne, etc.	Henry Petty-Fitzmaurice; 1780–1863; 3rd Marquess of Lansdowne, etc., 4th Earl of Shelburne, etc., 4th Earl of Kerry, 24th Baron Kerry	Margaret Mercer Elphinstone; 1788–1867; Comtesse de Flahaut, 2nd Baroness Keith (Ire, UK), 7th Lady Nairne	William Robert Feilding; 1760–1799 styled Viscount Feilding
Baronies of Keith (2nd & 3rd creations) extinct, 1867
William Thomas Petty-FitzMaurice; 1811–1836 styled Earl of Kerry	Henry Thomas Petty-Fitzmaurice; 1816–1866; 4th Marquess of Lansdowne, etc., 5th Earl of Shelburne, etc., 5th Earl of Kerry, 24th Baron Kerry	Emily Jane Petty-FitzMaurice; 1819–1895; 8th Lady Nairne	William Basil Percy Feilding; 1796–1865; 7th Earl Denbigh, etc. 6th Earl of Desmond, etc., 6th Baron St. Liz
Baron Mersey, 1910; Viscount Mersey, 1916	Baron Fitzmaurice, 1906
John Charles Bigham; 1840–1929; 1st Viscount Mersey, etc.	Henry Charles Keith Petty-Fitzmaurice; 1845–1927; 5th Marquess of Lansdowne, etc., 6th Earl of Shelburne, etc., 6th Earl of Kerry, 24th Baron Kerry, 9th Lord Nairne	Edmond Fitzmaurice; 1846–1935; Baron Fitzmaurice	Rudolph William Basil Feilding ("Rollo"); 1823–1892; 8th Earl Denbigh, etc. 7th Earl of Desmond, etc., 7th Baron St. Liz
Barony of Fitzmaurice extinct, 1935
Charles Clive Bigham; 1872–1956; 2nd Viscount Mersey, etc.	Henry William Edmund Petty-Fitzmaurice; 1872–1936; 6th Marquess of Lansdowne, etc., 7th Earl of Shelburne, etc., 7th Earl of Kerry, 25th Baron Kerry, 10th Lord Nairne	Charles Fitzmaurice; 1874–1914	Rudolph Robert Basil Aloysius Augustine Feilding; 1859–1939; 9th Earl Denbigh, etc. 8th Earl of Desmond, etc., 8th Baron St. Liz
Edward Clive Bigham; 1906–1979; 3rd Viscount Mersey, etc.	Katherine Bigham; 1912–1995; 12th Lady Nairne	Charles Hope Petty-Fitzmaurice; 1917–1944; 7th Marquess of Lansdowne, etc., 8th Earl of Shelburne, etc., 8th Earl of Kerry, 26th Baron Kerry, 11th Lord Nairne	George John Charles Mercer Nairne Petty-Fitzmaurice; 1912–1999; 8th Marquess of Lansdowne, etc., 9th Earl of Shelburne, etc., 9th Earl of Kerry, 27th Baron Kerry	William Rudolph Stephen Feilding; 1912–1966; 10th Earl Denbigh, etc. 9th Earl of Desmond, etc., 9th Baron St. Liz
Richard Maurice Clive Bigham; 1934–2006; 4th Viscount Mersey, etc., 13th Lord Nairne	David Edward Hugh Bigham b. 1938	Charles Maurice Petty-Fitzmaurice b. 1941; 9th Marquess of Lansdowne, etc., 10th Earl of Shelburne, etc., 10th Earl of Kerry, 28th Baron Kerry	William Rudolph Michael Feilding ("Rollo"); 1943–1995; 11th Earl Denbigh, etc. 10th Earl of Desmond, etc., 10th Baron St. Liz
Edward John Hallam Bigham b. 1966; 5th Viscount Mersey, etc., 14th Lord Nairne	Charles Richard Petty Bigham b. 1967 heir presumptive to the Viscountcy of Mersey	Simon Henry George Petty-Fitzmaurice b. 1970 styled Earl of Kerry; heir apparent to the marquessate of Landsdowne, earldoms of Shelburne and Kerry, and the barony of Kerry	Alexander Stephen Rudolph Feilding b. 1970; 12th Earl Denbigh, etc. 11th Earl of Desmond, etc., 11th Baron St. Liz
Flora Bigham b. 2003 styled Mistress of Nairne	George Henry Charles Petty-Fitzmaurice b. 2020 styled Viscount Calne and Calston	Orlando Gregory Danger Feilding b. 2009 styled Viscount Feilding; heir apparent to the earldoms of Denbigh and Desmond and the barony of St. Liz
