= William Fielding =

William Fielding may refer to:

- William Stevens Fielding (1848–1929), Canadian journalist, politician, and Premier of Nova Scotia
- William Fielding (architect) (1875–1946), New Zealand architect, and bowls player
- Bill Fielding (1915–2006), English footballer

== See also ==
- William Feilding (disambiguation)
