= Charles Fielding (1863–1941) =

British businessman, landowner, farmer, writer and civil servant

Sir Charles William Fielding, KBE (4 October 1863 – 9 April 1941) was a British businessman, landowner, farmer, writer and civil servant.

Born on 4 October 1863, he was the only son of Thomas Mantell Fielding (1834–1914) and Jean Eleanora, née Ewing (died 1898). A direct male line descendant of the novelist Henry Fielding and the aristocrat George Feilding, 1st Earl of Desmond, he was the owner of 3,000 acres of land in Sussex, half of which were farmed. He was a keen advocate for supporting the domestic production of food. He was also a director of the Rio Tinto Company (serving as chairman later in life).

During the First World War, that company supplied pyrites to the Allies at discounted prices. Fielding assisted the wartime government as a member of the Board of Trade's non-ferrous metals committee, as a member of the Restriction of Imports Committee, as a member of the council of the Ministry of Reconstruction and, from 1917, as chairman of the Materials and Metals Economy Committee of the Ministry of Munitions. Having also served on the Committee on the Production of Food in 1915, he was appointed Director-General of Food Production at the Ministry of Food in 1918, serving until 1919. For his war services, he was appointed a Knight Commander of the Order of the British Empire in June 1917.

Afterwards, he remained interested in agricultural policy, writing Food (1923), Prosperity for England (1928) and Permanent Prosperity for Britain and Profitable Work for All Unemployed (1934). He died on 9 April 1941 at Ingfield Manor in Billingshurst.
