= Grand Carver of England =

Hereditary office in the UK Royal Household

Royal coat of arms

The Grand Carver of England is an hereditary office in the Royal Household of the sovereign of England, then Great Britain, and later the United Kingdom, held in gross.

== Role ==
The Grand Carver is charged with carving the Monarch's meat during official and royal dinners.

== Officers ==
The Earl of Denbigh and Desmond currently serves as Grand Carver.

== See also ==
- Great Officers of State
