= Rudolph Feilding, 9th Earl of Denbigh =

British Army officer and peer

The Right Honourable The Earl of Denbigh GCVO TD JP DL ADC
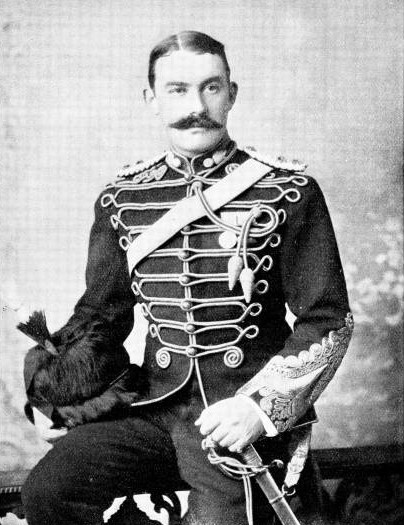
- Portrait as Lt. Colonel of the Ancient and Honourable Artillery Company, 1897

Lord-in-waiting
- In office 1897–1905
- Monarchs: Queen Victoria; Edward VII

Personal details
- Born: 26 May 1859 Whitford, Flintshire, Wales
- Died: 25 November 1939 (aged 80) Surrey, England
- Spouses: Hon. Cecilia Mary Clifford (m. 1884; died 1919) Kathleen Emmet (m. 1923)
- Parent(s): Rudolph Feilding, 8th Earl of Denbigh; Mary Berkeley

Military service
- Allegiance: United Kingdom of Great Britain and Ireland
- Branch/service: British Army
- Rank: Colonel-Commandant
- Commands: Honourable Artillery Company; Royal Horse Artillery
- Battles/wars: Anglo-Egyptian War; Battle of Tel el-Kebir; First World War

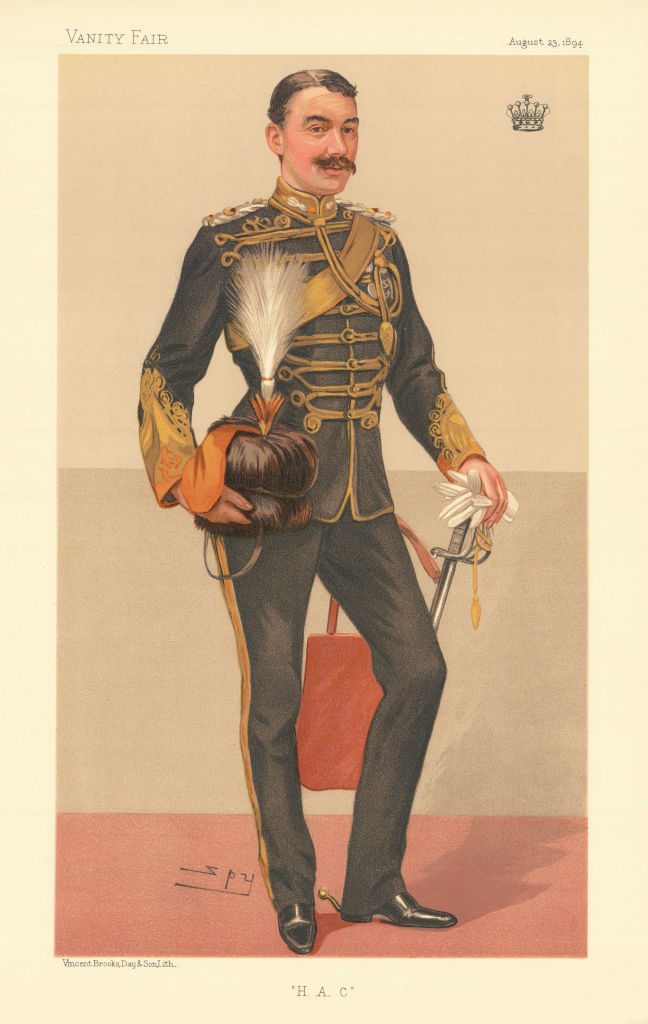
The Earl of Denbigh as caricatured by Spy (Leslie Ward) in Vanity Fair, August 1894

Rudolph Robert Basil Aloysius Augustine Feilding, 9th Earl of Denbigh, 8th Earl of Desmond, GCVO, TD, DL, JP, ADC (26 May 1859 – 25 November 1939), styled Viscount Feilding from 1865 to 1892, was a British Army officer and peer.

== Biography ==
Lord Feilding was born at Downing Hall, near Whitford, Flintshire, the eldest son of the 8th Earl of Denbigh and Mary (née Berkeley). He succeeded his father as Earl of Denbigh in 1892.

He gained the rank of captain in the Royal Horse Artillery. He was present at the Battle of Tel el-Kebir in 1882, where he laid the horse artillery gun that hit the third railway train on the line there and prevented the further retreat of the Egyptians. He was later awarded the Order of the Nile, 3rd Class by Sultan Hussein Kamel.

Lord Denbigh was Colonel commandant of the Honourable Artillery Company from 1903 until 1933. He held the office of Conservative Parliamentary Lord-in-waiting between 1897 and 1905. In April 1900 he accompanied Queen Victoria on her first visit to Ireland since 1861.

In March 1902, Lord Denbigh was head of a mission sent by the British government to congratulate Pope Leo XIII upon entering on the 25th year of his Pontificate. He was aide-de-camp to George V from 1911 to 1926.

== Personal life ==
On 24 September 1884, the then Viscount Fielding married Hon. Cecilia Mary Clifford (1860–1919), daughter of Charles Hugh Clifford, 8th Baron Clifford of Chudleigh and the Hon. Agnes Louisa Catherine (née Petre). They had three sons and seven daughters:

- Rudolph Edmund Aloysius Feilding, Viscount Feilding (12 October 1885 – 10 January 1937), whose son, the 10th Earl of Denbigh, succeeded.
- Lt-Cmdr. Hon. Hugh Cecil Robert Feilding (30 December 1886 – 31 May 1916), senior officer in the Royal Navy, killed at the Battle of Jutland.
- Lady Mary Alice Clara Feilding (31 March 1888 – 1973), married Sir Cecil Dormer, of HM Diplomatic Service, without issue.
- Lady Dorothie Mary Evelyn Feilding (6 October 1889 – 24 October 1935), married Capt. Charles O'Hara Moore, of Mooresfort, County Tipperary, officer in the Irish Guards, and had issue.
- Lady Agnes Mary Mabel Feilding (13 September 1891 – 31 August 1938), a nun.
- Lady Marjorie Mary Winifrede Feilding (4 September 1892 – 1956), married firstly Capt. Edward Hanly, of Avonmore House, County Wicklow, officer in the Royal Inniskilling Fusiliers, in 1915 (divorced 1923), and secondly Capt. Robert Arthur Heath in 1923.
- Capt. Hon. Henry Simon Feilding (29 June 1894 – 9 October 1917), killed at the Battle of Passchendaele.
- Lady Clare Mary Cecilia Feilding (23 November 1896 – 1966), married G/Capt. Joseph Smyth-Pigott, a Royal Air Force officer, and had issue.
- Lady Elizabeth Mary Feilding (22 August 1899 – 1982), married Eric Sherbrooke Walker, and had issue.
- Lady Victoria Mary Dolores Feilding (29 March 1901 – 1985), married Walter Miles Fletcher, and had issue.

A widower, the Earl married, secondly, on 12 February 1923 to Kathleen Emmet (d. 13 February 1952), daughter and heiress of Thomas Addis Emmet, of New York City, a scion of the family of United Irishmen leaders Thomas Addis Emmet and Robert Emmet.

== Honours ==
- – Royal Victorian Order (GCVO) 1927

=== Foreign honours ===
- – Order of the Nile (Egypt) 1915
- – Grand Cross, Military order of Christ (Portugal)
- – Grand Cross of the Order of Charles III (Spain)

The latter honour entitled Lord Denbigh to be addressed as The Most Excellent.

== Sources ==
- Goold Walker, G. (1986). The Honourable Artillery Company, 1537–1987. London: Honourable Artillery Company.

Military offices
Unknown	Colonel Commandant and President, Honourable Artillery Company; 1903–1933	Succeeded by Viscount Galway
Political offices
Preceded by The Earl of Ranfurly	Lord-in-waiting; 1895–1905	Succeeded by The Earl Granville
Peerage of England
Preceded by Rudolph William Basil Feilding	Earl of Denbigh; 1892–1939	Succeeded by William Rudolph Stephen Feilding
Peerage of Ireland
Preceded by Rudolph William Basil Feilding	Earl of Desmond; 1892–1939	Succeeded by William Rudolph Stephen Feilding
