= Charles Fielding =

Royal Navy officer (1738–1783)

Captain Charles Fielding
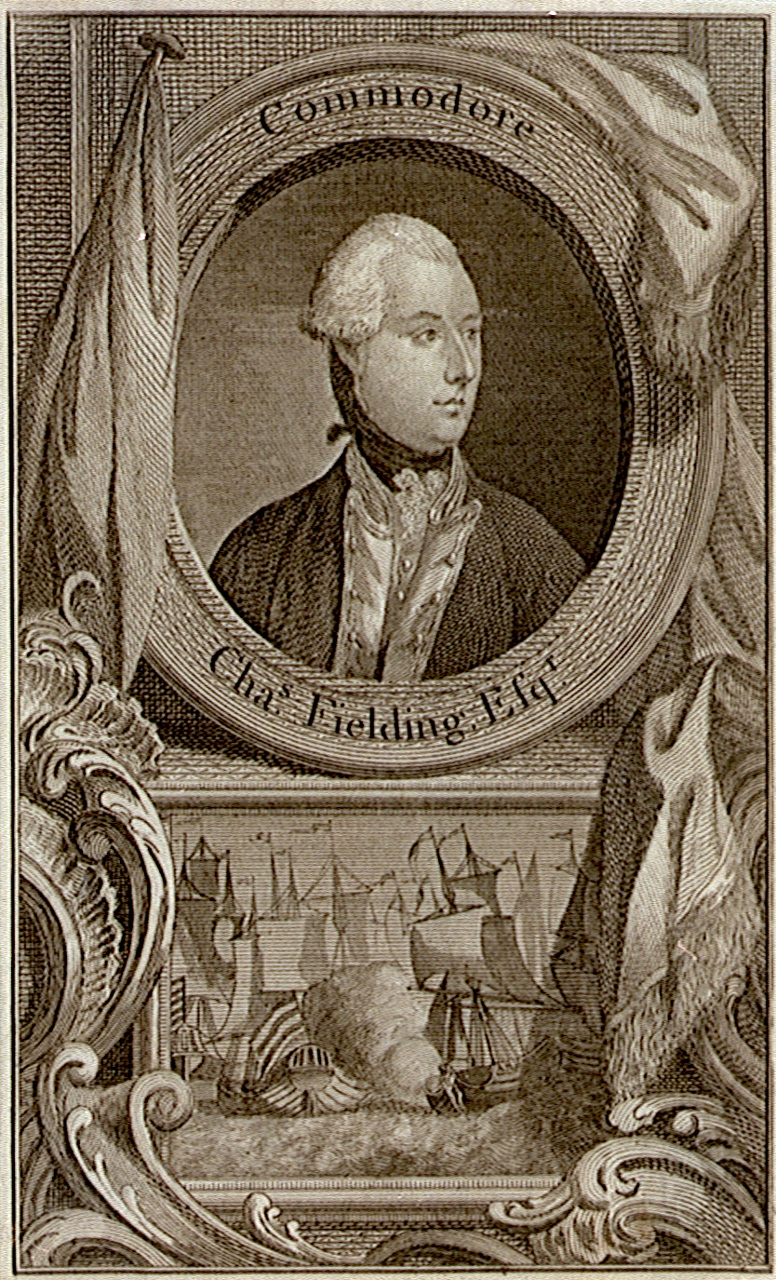
- c. 1780 portrait of Fielding
- Born: July 2, 1738
- Died: January 11, 1783 (aged 44)
- Military career
- Allegiance: Great Britain
- Branch: Royal Navy
- Service years: –1783
- Rank: Captain
- Conflicts: American Revolutionary War; Affair of Fielding and Bylandt; Battle of Cape Spartel

Captain Charles Fielding (2 July 1738 – 11 January 1783) was a Royal Navy officer who was the initiator of the affair of Fielding and Bylandt in the run-up to the Fourth Anglo-Dutch War. He attained the rank of Commodore and died of gangrene after being wounded in action during the Battle of Cape Spartel, commanding HMS Ganges.

== Family life ==
Fielding was the second son of Hon. Charles Feilding, Colonel in the Guards and Equerry to King George II of Great Britain, and Elizabeth Palmer. His father was the third son the 4th Earl of Denbigh, his mother's Palmer sisters were married to Hon. Edward Finch and 8th Earl of Winchilsea, coincidentally his father's sister also was previously married to the 8th Earl of Winchilsea.

He married Sophia Finch, a Woman of the Bedchamber to Queen Charlotte on 29 February 1772. (She was a sister of George Finch, 9th Earl of Winchilsea and daughter of Hon. William Finch) They had three daughters and a son, also called Charles, who became a rear-admiral in the Royal Navy. One daughter married Thomas Farrell, the settler of Deer Island, New Brunswick although she remained in England as a lady in waiting to the Queen.

== Career ==
Fielding enlisted in the Royal Navy at an early age, probably following the usual career after starting as a midshipman. From his early career little is known, according to his biographer, Charnock, but he was appointed a Post-Captain on 27 August 1760 (during the Seven Years' War) and given command of HMS Flamstead (20). In 1762 he was given command of HMS Unicorn which was decommissioned after the end of the war. Apparently, he did not receive a new command until 1770, when he was appointed to HMS Achilles (a fourth-rate of 60 guns, launched in 1757) as flag captain of Admiral Sir Francis Geary.

Soon after, he received command of HMS Rainbow (44) on which he sailed till he received command of HMS Kent in 1772. During his tenure the Kent experienced an explosion in July, 1774 in which eleven seamen lost their lives. He was found to be not at fault for the incident, and retained his command for the usual term. In 1776 he received command of HMS Diamond with which he transported troops to America, where the American War of Independence had begun. He remained in that area for some years and in 1778 temporarily commanded the Halifax Station, where he distinguished himself.

After his return to Europe in 1779 he was given command of HMS Namur, a second rate of 90 guns, and put in charge of a squadron of ships of the line cruising the English Channel to intercept Dutch convoys. As officer commanding a squadron he was allowed to carry the title of "commodore" though his formal rank remained that of captain. He intercepted a convoy of Dutch merchantmen escorted by a smaller squadron of naval vessels of the Dutch Republic Navy under command of Rear-Admiral Count Lodewijk van Bylandt, which led to the Affair of Fielding and Bylandt of 31 December 1779. The commotion this incident caused in the Republic would eventually lead to the Fourth Anglo-Dutch War.

Shortly afterwards he was removed to HMS Minerva in which he accompanied Admiral George Darby, when the latter relieved Gibraltar in April, 1781. After the commissioning of HMS Ganges in 1782 he became her first captain. He accompanied Admiral Howe (with whom he had already served in American waters) to Gibraltar in September, 1782. He was lightly wounded by a splinter in the arm during the skirmish that is known as the Battle of Cape Spartel on 20 October 1782. Though the wound was far from serious, infection set in and Fielding died of gangrene on 11 January of the following year.

== Sources ==
- Clarke, J. S., and Jones, S. (1807) The Naval Chronicle. Vol 18. p. 2, fn. *
- "Fielding, Charles," in: Charnock, John (1798). Biographia navalis: or, Impartial memoirs of the lives and characters of officers of the navy of Great Britain, from the year 1660 to the present time; drawn from the most authentic sources, and disposed in a chronological arrangement, Volume 6. pp. 391–393.
