= Michael Stanhope (died c. 1621) =

English politician

Sir Michael Stanhope (c. 1549 – c. 1621), of Sudbourne, Suffolk, was an English politician. Stanhope was the youngest surviving son of Michael Stanhope and Anne Rawson.

He was a groom or gentlemen of the Privy Chamber to Elizabeth I. In November 1599 the Lord Keeper Thomas Egerton, seeking the queen's favour, asked him to give her a gift of pearls. She told Stanhope to return them to Egerton, and he thought Stanhope had let him down. Stanhope wrote to Sir Robert Cecil about this incident, and the illness of his wife's servant, which kept him from court for fear of spreading infection.

He was knighted in 1603 by King James I. He was a Member of Parliament (MP) for Castle Rising in 1584, Ipswich in 1597 and 1601, and for Orford in 1604.

There is a monument to him in Sudbourne church.

== Marriage and family ==
He married Elizabeth Read (died April 1616), the daughter of Sir William Read of Osterley, Middlesex, by whom he had three daughters, who were his coheirs.

- Jane Stanhope, who married (1) Henry Radclyffe, a son of Robert Radclyffe, 5th Earl of Sussex, (2) Sir William Withipole.
- Elizabeth Stanhope, who married George Berkeley, 8th Baron Berkeley.
- Bridget Stanhope (born February 1616), who married George Feilding, 1st Earl of Desmond. (It was rumoured that Sir Eustace Hart had sired Bridget Stanhope, although the baptismal record at St Mary Abbots Church, Kensington has her as the daughter of Sir Michael.)
