= William Feilding, 3rd Earl of Denbigh =

English peer (1640–1685)

William Feilding, 3rd Earl of Denbigh, 2nd Earl of Desmond (29 December 1640 – 23 August 1685) was an English nobleman. He was the son of George Feilding, 1st Earl of Desmond, and his wife, the former Bridget Stanhope, daughter of Sir Michael Stanhope.

Arms of Feilding

Feilding inherited the title of Earl of Denbigh from his paternal uncle Basil Feilding, 2nd Earl of Denbigh, who died without heirs in 1675.

He married, firstly, Mary King (died 1669), daughter of Sir Robert King and Frances Folliott, daughter of Henry Folliott, 1st Baron Folliott. Secondly, he married Lady Mary Carey, daughter of Henry Carey, 2nd Earl of Monmouth. He died on 23 August 1685, aged 44. By his first wife, Mary King, Feilding had the following children:

- Lady Mary Feilding (c. 1668 – c. December 1697), who married Evelyn Pierrepont, 1st Duke of Kingston-upon-Hull, and had issue.
- Basil Feilding, 4th Earl of Denbigh (1668 – 18 March 1717), who married Hester Firebrace, and had issue.

There were no children from the earl's second marriage.

Honorary titles
Preceded by The Earl of Huntingdon	Custos Rotulorum of Leicestershire; 1680–1681	Succeeded by The Earl of Huntingdon
Peerage of Ireland
Preceded by George Feilding	Earl of Desmond; 1666–1685	Succeeded by Basil Feilding
Peerage of England
Preceded by Basil Feilding	Earl of Denbigh; 1675–1685	Succeeded by Basil Feilding
