= Geoffrey Cooke (cricketer) =

English cricketer and British Army officer

Personal information
- Full name: Geoffrey Charles Sidney Bancroft Cooke
- Born: 8 September 1897; Westminster, London, England
- Died: 4 December 1980 (aged 83); Sunningdale, Berkshire, England
- Batting: Right-handed
- Bowling: Unknown

Career statistics
Competition	First-class
Matches	2
Runs scored	25
Batting average	12.50
100s/50s	–/–
Top score	13
Balls bowled	217
Wickets	6
Bowling average	20.00
5 wickets in innings	–
10 wickets in match	–
Best bowling	4/39
Catches/stumpings	3/–
- Source: Cricinfo, 20 April 2019

Lt.-Col. Geoffrey Charles Sidney Bancroft Cooke (8 September 1897 – 4 December 1980) was an English first-class cricketer and British Army officer. Initially serving in the First World War with the Royal Garrison Artillery, he later attended the University of Cambridge following the conclusion of the war. After completing his studies, he served in the Royal Artillery from 1922–1948, serving in the Second World War. He also played first-class cricket for the British Army cricket team.

== Life and military career ==
The son of Lt.-Col. Sidney FitzWyman Cooke and his wife, Alice Eliza Bancroft, he was born at Westminster and educated at Charterhouse School. After completing his education at Charterhouse, he served in the First World War with the Royal Garrison Artillery, enlisting as a second lieutenant in October 1916. After the war, he attended Pembroke College, Cambridge.

He graduated from Pembroke in 1922, upon which he reenlisted with the Royal Artillery. He was promoted to the rank of lieutenant in September 1922. He was seconded to the Experimental Establishment at Shoeburyness in April 1924. He made his debut in first-class cricket for the British Army cricket team against the Royal Navy at Lord's in 1925, before making a second first-class appearance for the Army against Cambridge University at Fenner's in 1926. He scored a total of 25 runs in his two matches, as well as taking 6 wickets with best figures of 4 for 39. He returned to the Royal Artillery in February 1928, and attended the Gunnery Staff Course in September 1929, during which he was promoted to the rank of captain in June 1930.

He returned the Royal Artillery in January 1931, but was seconded to the Pembroke Royal Garrison Artillery as an adjutant in November 1932. He transferred to the Glamorgan Royal Garrison Artillery in December 1933. He returned to Shoeburyness in November 1936, and by August 1938 held the rank of major. Having served in the Second World War, he retired from active service in May 1948, at which point he was granted the honorary rank of lieutenant colonel.

He married Vivienne Paine in 1929. Their only daughter, Caroline Judith Vivienne, married Rollo Feilding, 11th Earl of Denbigh. Cooke died at the age of 83 in December 1980 at Sunningdale, Berkshire.
