= George Feilding, 1st Earl of Desmond =

English aristocrat (1614–1665)

George Feilding, 1st Earl of Desmond (c. 1614 – 31 January 1665) was an English nobleman, awarded the title of Earl of Desmond in the Peerage of Ireland by Charles I under the terms of a letter patent issued by James I. He was created Registrar of the Court of Admiralty, for life, in 1625.

George Feilding was the second son of William Feilding, 1st Earl of Denbigh, and his wife, Susan Villiers. His mother was the sister of George Villiers, 1st Duke of Buckingham, confidant and lover of King James, and her family were showered with titles and preferment as a result of Villiers' immense influence.

== Peerage ==
In 1622, when George was eight years old, his father, Viscount Feilding, was created Earl of Denbigh in the Peerage of England by James I. In the same year, George was awarded a series of titles in the Peerage of Ireland: he was made Baron Fielding, of Lecaghe in the County of Tipperary, and Viscount Callan, of Callan in the County of Kilkenny. George was also given the right to the title Earl of Desmond on reversion, as and when the then-current holder of that title, Richard Preston, who had no sons, died without a male heir: the expectation was that George would marry Preston's daughter Elizabeth.

George was just one of a large number of English men made Irish peers in the period. Under James I, George Villiers oversaw a very rapid expansion in the Irish Peerage, designed to increase English control over the Irish House of Lords.

The title Earl of Desmond was first awarded in 1329 to the Anglo-Irish FitzGerald family in the south-west of Ireland. In 1582, in the Tudor conquest of Ireland, the 14th FitzGerald Earl of Desmond was stripped of his title and beheaded after he rebelled as a Catholic against the Protestant English Crown. FitzGerald's neighbour and close relative, the Earl of Ormond, fared better but the Ormond family remained split between Catholics and Protestants. On the death of the 10th Earl of Ormond, King James allowed the male heir, the Earl's nephew, a Catholic, to become the 11th Earl. However the King ordered that the bulk of the huge Ormond estate should go to the 10th Earl's daughter, Elizabeth Butler, a Protestant.

Elizabeth Butler married Richard Preston, a former favourite of James I. The King recreated the title Earl of Desmond for Preston and Preston's only child, also called Elizabeth, became heir to the Ormond estate. The marriage of George Feilding to Elizabeth Preston would thus give George an Irish estate to go with his new title. It would also connect the Feildings to the original, ancient Desmond family: Elizabeth's great-grandmother had been daughter of James FitzGerald, 10th Earl of Desmond.

However, Elizabeth was more independent minded than had been allowed for. Instead of marrying George Feilding she chose to marry her second cousin, the heir to the Ormond Earldom, thus reuniting the Ormond title and estate.

Nonetheless, in 1628 Preston died and George inherited the title.

== Family ==
George married Bridget Stanhope, who was the daughter of Sir Michael Stanhope and Elizabeth Read. The couple had several children:

- Lady Frances Feilding (died 1680), who married Sir Edward Gage, 1st Baronet, as his third wife
- Lady Mary Feilding (died 1691), who married Sir Charles Gawdy, 1st Baronet
- Lady Bridget Feilding (died 1669), who married Arthur Parsons
- William Feilding, 2nd Earl of Desmond, later 3rd Earl of Denbigh
- Hon. George Feilding
- Colonel Hon. Sir Charles Feilding (1641–1722), who married Ursula Stockton, daughter of Sir Thomas Stockton and Ursula Bellot, and widow of Sir William Aston, (both Stockton and Aston were High Court judges in Ireland) and had two daughters
- Rev. Hon. John Feilding (1641–1697), who married Bridget Cokayne and had children, including John, secretary to the Governor of Jamaica
- Hon. Basil Feilding (died May 1667), killed in a quarrel by his brother Christopher
- Hon. Christopher Feilding, sentenced to death in July 1667 for killing his brother Basil in a drunken quarrel."No one pitied him" was the terse verdict of Samuel Pepys.

Peerage of Ireland
New creation	Earl of Desmond; 1628–1665	Succeeded by William Feilding
New creation	Viscount Callan; 1622–1665	Succeeded by William Feilding
