= Rollo Feilding, 11th Earl of Denbigh =

British peer, businessman and racing driver (1943–1995)

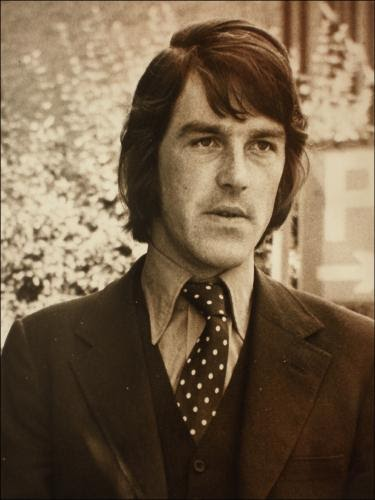
Rollo Feilding

William Rudolph Michael Feilding, 11th Earl of Denbigh (Note: Also the 10th Earl of Desmond in the peerage of Ireland) (2 August 1943 – 23 March 1995), known as Rollo Feilding and Rollo Denbigh, was a British peer, advertising executive, and racing driver.

== Family and early life ==
Rollo Feilding was born on 2 August 1943 in Mere, Wiltshire. His father was William Feilding, 10th Earl of Denbigh and his mother was Verena Barbara Feilding, Countess of Denbigh (née Price). He was educated at Eton College.

On 2 September 1965 in London, he married Caroline Judith Vivienne Cooke, the daughter of Lt.-Col. Geoffrey Cooke. They had three children: Lady Samantha, Lady Louisa, and Alexander, who succeeded as 12th Earl of Denbigh and 11th Earl of Desmond.

== Career ==
Succeeding his father as Earl of Denbigh and Earl of Desmond in 1966, Denbigh was involved in sports car racing events in the 1960s. He entered his first race, the 1964 National Silverstone, in a Lotus Seven. Later that year, he raced a Ferrari 250 GTO for the BRSCC at Mallory Park, finishing second. Over the next several years, he raced in sports car endurance events at numerous locations. He entered Formula Three in 1966 and raced at Belgian Spa, Kyalami, and Nürburgring, finishing second at Kyalami circuit in South Africa. Lord Denbigh attempted to enter into the 1968 24 Hours of Le Mans in a Scodec-Diva Martin Valkyr, but was not accepted.

Denbigh retired from racing and became involved in dealing Rolls-Royce and other sports cars. In the 1970s, he was involved in advertising. He had also managed several rock band music groups, including The Animals.

== Later life ==
Denbigh was fond of motorcycling, undertaking numerous motorcycle trips across the world. He died in March 1995, aged 51. His will was valued at £1,417,775. He was succeeded in the earldom by his son Alexander.

== Notes ==
Peerage of England
Preceded by William Rudolph Stephen Feilding	Earl of Denbigh; 1966–1995	Succeeded by Alexander Stephen Rudolph Feilding
Peerage of Ireland
Preceded by William Rudolph Stephen Feilding	Earl of Desmond; 1966–1995	Succeeded by Alexander Stephen Rudolph Feilding
