= Earl of Denbigh =

Title in the Peerage of England

Earldom of Denbigh held with Earldom of Desmond
- Arms of Feilding, Earls of Denbigh: Argent, on a fess azure three fusils or
- Creation date: 1622
- Created by: James VI and I
- Peerage: Peerage of England
- First holder: William Feilding, 1st Viscount Feilding
- Present holder: Alexander Feilding, 12th Earl of Denbigh, 11th Earl of Desmond
- Heir apparent: Peregrine Feilding, Viscount Feilding
- Subsidiary titles: Viscount Feilding; Viscount Callan; Baron Fielding of Newnham Paddockes; Baron St Liz; Baron Fielding of Lecaghe
- Seat: Newnham Paddox
- Motto: Crescit sub pondere virtus (Virtue grows under oppression)

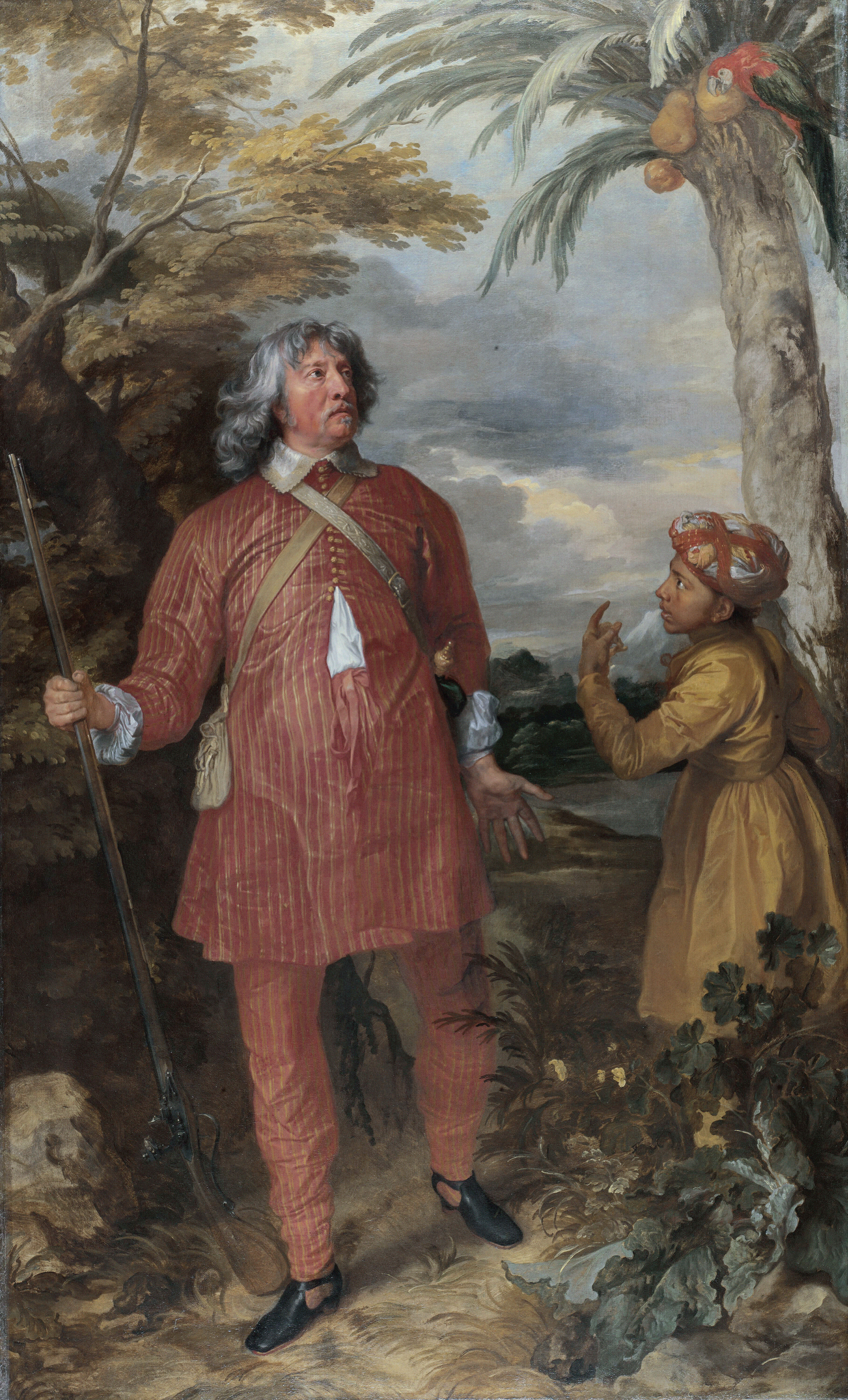
William Feilding, 1st Earl of Denbigh, visited India in 1631–3. On his return, Van Dyck painted him in oriental dress.

Earl of Denbigh (pronounced 'Denby') is a title in the Peerage of England. It was created in 1622 for William Feilding, Viscount Feilding, a courtier, admiral, and brother-in-law of the powerful Duke of Buckingham. The title is named after the town of Denbigh in the county of Denbighshire, Wales. Since the time of the third earl (1675), the Earl of Denbigh has also held the title of Earl of Desmond, in the Peerage of Ireland.

The family seat is Newnham Paddox, in the parish of Monks Kirby, Warwickshire. The eighth earl converted to Roman Catholicism during the 1850s, in which faith the family has remained. The earldom was one of the hereditary peerages whose entitlement to sit in the House of Lords was removed by the House of Lords Act 1999.

== Origins of the Feilding family ==
The Feilding family have been Lords of Newnham Paddox in Monks Kirby, Warwickshire, since 1433. They are in part descended from the Newnham family (named from the estate) who held Newnham Paddox in the 1100s and 1200s (see history of Monks Kirby).

The nineteenth-century historian S.R. Gardiner described the first Earl of Denbigh, William Feilding, as "the plain country gentleman who had the good luck to marry Buckingham's sister in the days of her poverty."

The family of William's wife, Susan Villiers, had also been minor midlands gentry until her brother, George Villiers, became the confidant and lover of King James I. Villiers was elevated by King James to the rank of Duke of Buckingham and continued as a royal favourite during the reign of King Charles I. Exceptionally powerful, Villiers showered preferment on his family. In 1622, not only was Feilding made Earl of Denbigh, but his second son, named George after his important uncle, was given the right to the earldom of Desmond at the point that title reverted to the Crown. In 1660, his daughter, Elizabeth, was created Countess of Guildford for life in her own right.

=== Claimed descent from the Habsburgs ===
From around 1656, a story began to be promulgated that the Feilding family were descended from the imperial Habsburg dynasty through the Counts of Laufenburg and Rheinfelden. The family incorporated the Habsburg double headed eagle in their coat of arms and took to naming their sons Rudolph. The claimed imperial ancestry was subject to ridicule, but was also widely accepted for centuries by historians including Edward Gibbon, William Dugdale, and Evelyn Shirley. The claim was, however, comprehensively debunked around the turn of the 20th century by J. Horace Round.

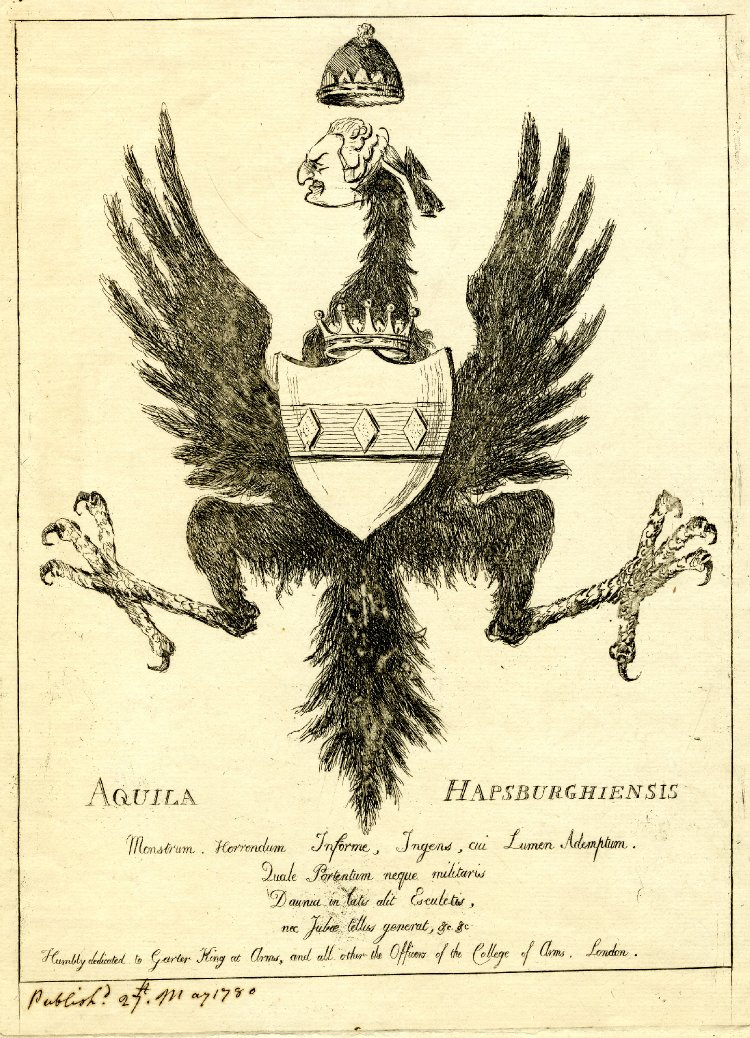
1780 Satirical print of the arms of the Feilding family superimposed on the Habsburg double-headed eagle lacking one head, dedicated to the Garter King of Arms and mocking the family's pretensions at ancestral connections to the Habsburg dynasty.

== The 1st and 2nd Earl of Denbigh and 1st Earl of Desmond (4th creation) ==
=== William Feilding, the First Earl of Denbigh ===
Sir William Feilding was Master of the Great Wardrobe under King James I and also took part in the Expedition to Cádiz of 1625. Feilding had already been created Baron Feilding, of Newnham Paddox in the County of Warwick, and Viscount Feilding in 1620 before being made Earl of Denbigh in 1622. All three titles are in the Peerage of England. In 1631, Lord Denbigh visited the Safavid court in Persia.

=== Basil Feilding, the Second Earl of Denbigh ===
Lord Denbigh was succeeded by his eldest son, Basil, the second Earl. Basil served as ambassador to Venice, and in military service to the Holy Roman Empire. He famously fought as a roundhead in the Civil War, unlike the rest of the family. In 1664, he was created Baron St Liz in the Peerage of England, with remainder to the heirs male of his father.

=== George Feilding, the First Earl of Desmond (4th Creation) ===
William's second son was the Hon. George Feilding. In 1622, when George was around 8 years old, James I created him Baron Fielding, of Lecaghe in the County of Tipperary, and Viscount Callan, of Callan in the County of Kilkenny. At the same time, George was given the right to the title Earl of Desmond as and when the previous holder of that title died without an heir. That happened in 1628. All three titles were in the Peerage of Ireland. Earl of Desmond is an ancient Irish title, the 1628 award was its 4th, and current creation.

== Earls of Denbigh (1st creation) and Earls of Desmond (4th creation) ==
Basil, the second earl of Denbigh, died childless and was succeeded by his nephew, William Feilding, 2nd Earl of Desmond, who now also became the third Earl of Denbigh (he also succeeded in the barony of St Liz by special remainder).

Basil, the fourth Earl of Denbigh, served as both Lord-Lieutenant of Denbighshire and Warwickshire.

Rudolph, the eighth earl, was a notable member of the Oxford Movement and converted to Roman Catholicism. The family have continued in the Catholic faith, becoming one of the most prominent aristocratic Catholic families.

The ninth Earl served as a Lord-in-waiting (government whip in the House of Lords) from 1897 to 1905 in the Conservative administrations of Lord Salisbury and Arthur Balfour.

The eleventh earl, under the name Rollo Feilding (the name Rollo, a diminutive of Rudolph, is traditional in the family), raced sports cars and was a notable socialite.

Since the third earl, the titles have descended from father to son, with the exception of the seventh earl and tenth earl who inherited the title from their grandfathers.

The title is currently held by the twelfth earl, who succeeded his father in 1995. As of 2010, Lord Denbigh is Grand Carver of England.

=== Earls of Denbigh ===
- William Feilding, 1st Earl of Denbigh (1587-1643)
- Basil Feilding, 2nd Earl of Denbigh (1608-1675)

=== Earls of Denbigh and Earls of Desmond ===
- William Feilding, 3rd Earl of Denbigh and 2nd Earl of Desmond (1640–1685)
- Basil Feilding, 4th Earl of Denbigh and 3rd Earl of Desmond (1668–1717)
- William Feilding, 5th Earl of Denbigh and 4th Earl of Desmond (1697–1755)
- Basil Feilding, 6th Earl of Denbigh and 5th Earl of Desmond (1719–1800)
  - William Robert Feilding, Viscount Feilding (1760–1799)
- William Basil Percy Feilding, 7th Earl of Denbigh and 6th Earl of Desmond (1796–1865)
- Rudolph William Basil Feilding, 8th Earl of Denbigh and 7th Earl of Desmond (1823–1892)
- Rudolph Robert Basil Aloysius Augustine Feilding, 9th Earl of Denbigh and 8th Earl of Desmond (1859–1939)
  - Rudolph Edmund Aloysius Feilding, Viscount Feilding (1885–1937)
- William Rudolph Stephen Feilding, 10th Earl of Denbigh and 9th Earl of Desmond (1912–1966)
- (William) Rudolph Michael Feilding, 11th Earl of Denbigh and 10th Earl of Desmond (1943–1995)
- Alexander Stephen Rudolph Feilding, 12th Earl of Denbigh and 11th Earl of Desmond (b. 1970)

The heir apparent is the present holder's son, Peregrine Rudolph Henry Feilding, Viscount Feilding (b. 2005).

== Notable members of the Feilding Family ==
- Lady Elizabeth Feilding, daughter of the first Earl of Denbigh, was created Countess of Guilford for life in 1660.
- Lady Dorothie Mary Evelyn Feilding-Moore, MM (6 October 1889 – 24 October 1935), daughter of the ninth earl, was a volunteer nurse and ambulance driver on the Western Front during World War I.

=== Children of Edmund Feilding, grandson of the 3rd Earl ===
Edmund Feilding was the third son of John Feilding, the youngest son of the 3rd earl. He had three notable children all of whom chose to spell their surname in the more conventional fashion as "Fielding":

- The writer and magistrate Henry Fielding, son of Edmund, is perhaps the most famous member of the Feilding family.
- Sarah Fielding, sister of Henry, was also a well-known author.
- John Fielding, half-brother of Henry and Sarah, was a celebrated blind magistrate (having served as assistant to Henry). Through the regular circulation of a police gazette containing descriptions of known criminals, John Fielding established the basis for the first police criminal records department.

=== Children and grandchildren of the 7th Earl ===
- The Hon. Sir Percy Robert Basil Feilding, was a General in the Army and fought in the Crimean War.
- Sir Geoffrey Percy Thynne Feilding, was a General in the Army who fought in World War I, and also a grandson of the Marquess of Bath.
- General William Henry Adelbert Feilding (6 January 1836 – 25 March 1895) was a British soldier of the Coldstream Guards who founded the town of Feilding, New Zealand.
