= Rudolph Feilding, Viscount Feilding =

British soldier and businessman (1885–1937)

Viscount Feilding CMG DSO JP
- Born: 12 October 1885
- Died: 9 January 1937 (aged 51); Newnham Paddox, Warwickshire, England
- Spouse(s): Agnes Imelda Mary Harding, Viscountess Feilding
- Children: 5, including the 10th Earl of Denbigh
- Military career
- Rank: Lieutenant Colonel
- Unit: Coldstream Guards

Rudolph Edmund Aloysius Feilding, Viscount Feilding CMG, DSO, JP (12 October 1885 – 9 January 1937) was a British Army officer and businessman.

== Early life and family ==
Rollo Feilding, as he was familiarly known, was the son of the 9th Earl of Denbigh and Hon. Cecilia Mary Clifford, daughter of Lord Clifford of Chudleigh. He was educated at The Oratory School and Christ Church, Oxford, where he graduated in 1907 (BA). He was styled as Viscount Feilding between 1892 and 1937. He was the brother of Lady Dorothie Feilding.

In 1911, Lord Feilding married Agnes Imelda Mary Harding, daughter of Francis Egerton Harding, of Old Springs, Staffordshire. They had five sons:

- William Rudolph Stephen Feilding, 10th Earl of Denbigh (1912–1966), who succeeded.
- Hon. David Charles Feilding (1913–1966)
- Capt. Hon. Basil Egerton Feilding (1916–1970)
- Hon. Hugh Richard Feilding (1920–1996)
- Hon. Henry Anthony Feilding (1924–1994)

== Military service ==
Lord Feilding served with the British Army as an officer before retiring to the Special Reserve.

=== First World War ===
Rejoining the army with the outbreak of the First World War, Feilding sailed for France with the Coldstream Guards. It was in this early phase of the war that he earned the Distinguished Service Cross for his gallantry in leading his platoon on 21 October 1914 at the First Battle of Ypres, during which the first battalion of the regiment was utterly annihilated. He led his platoon in an attack, held the position gained for two days under heavy artillery fire and prepared defensive positions.

Later, he rose to the rank of major and then Lieutenant-colonel, was mentioned in dispatches. He was decorated with the Legion of Honour, and Order of St Michael and St George in 1918.

== Later life ==
Following his wartime service, Lord Feilding moved into business. He took the directorship of several companies, including British Plaster Board Ltd, Sea Insurance Company Ltd and Vitamins Ltd.

He died at his home, Newnham Paddox, near Rugby, predeceasing his father, after suffering from influenza at the age of 51. Feilding had five sons, the eldest of whom, the Hon. William Rudolph Stephen Feilding, succeeded to the earldom.

He was Justice of the Peace for Warwickshire in 1967.
