= William Feilding, 5th Earl of Denbigh =

English nobleman (1697–1755)

William Feilding, 5th Earl of Denbigh and 4th Earl of Desmond (26 October 1697 – 2 August 1755), styled as Viscount Feilding until 1717, was an English nobleman.

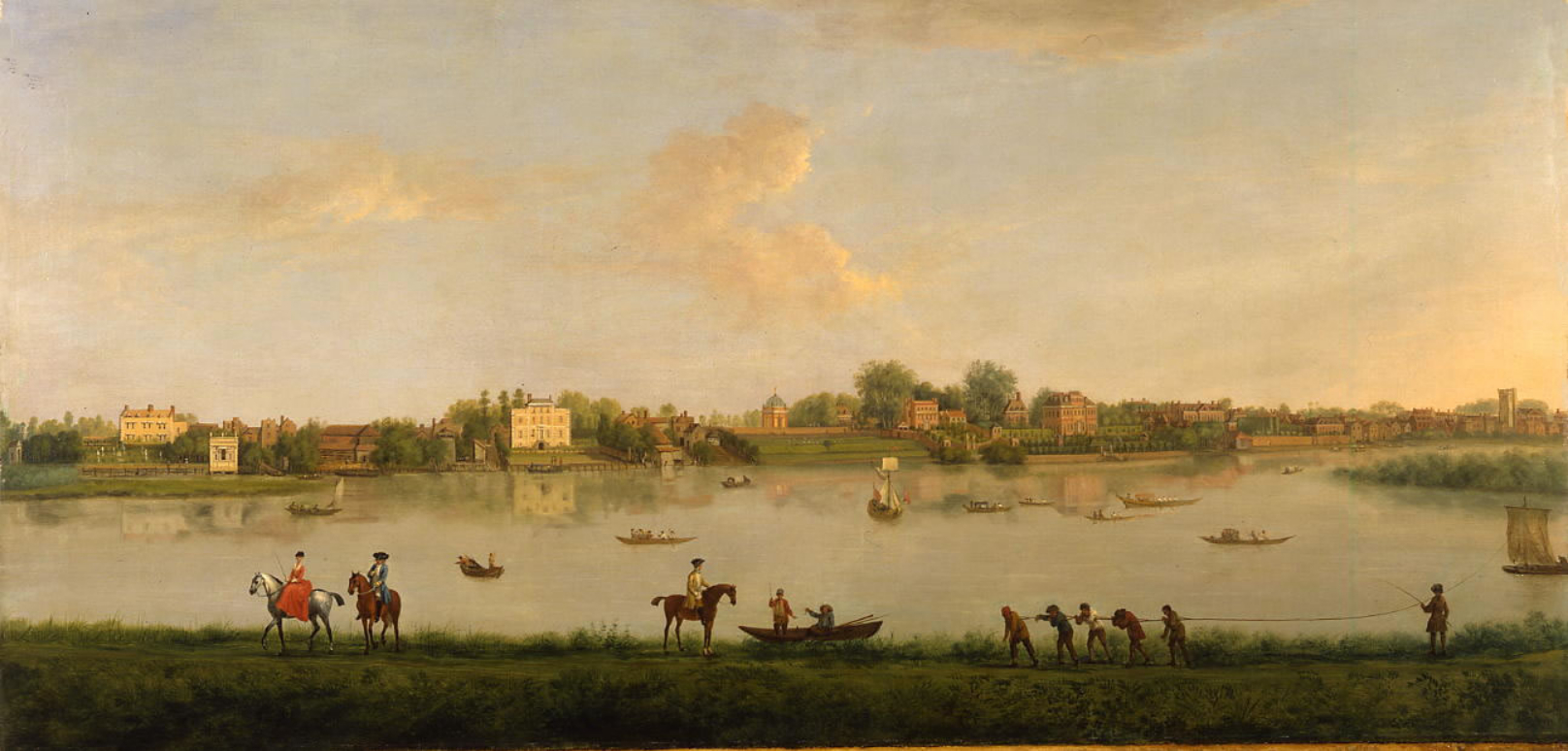
The Thames at Twickenham by Peter Tillemans, c.1724. Lord Denbigh's house may be seen in the background.

Denbigh was the son of Basil Feilding, 4th Earl of Denbigh and Hester Firebrace, only daughter of Sir Basil Firebrace, 1st Baronet. He succeeded his father to the Earldom of Denbigh, in the peerage of England, and the Earldom of Desmond, in the peerage of Ireland, in 1717.

In 1718 at Utrecht, Lord Denbigh married Isabella Haeck de Jong (1694–1769), daughter of Peter Haeck de Jong, burgomaster of Utrecht. Lady Denbigh's sister, Maria Catherina Haeck de Jong, later married the Marquess of Blandford, who, according to Lord Egmont, took after Denbigh's example of marrying an older Dutchwoman for love.

Lord Denbigh and his wife had one son, Basil Feilding, 6th Earl of Denbigh, who succeeded to the earldom.

In the 1730s, the Earl and Countess of Denbigh were said to have been living "very elegantly in the middle of a fine vineyard three miles from Lyon". The family were good friends of Alexander Pope and Stephen Hales, respectively. After Lord Denbigh's death in 1755, Lady Denbigh went to live with her sister, the Marchioness of Blandford. Both sisters died and were buried in Richmond, Middlesex.

== See also ==
- William Godolphin, Marquess of Blandford
