= Basil Feilding, 4th Earl of Denbigh =

Anglo-Irish peer and courtier (1668–1717)

The Right Honourable The Earl of Denbigh
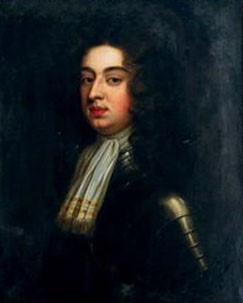
- Born: 1668; County Kilkenny, Ireland
- Died: 18 March 1716/7; Denbighshire, Wales
- Burial place: Monks Kirby, Warwickshire
- Spouse: Hester Firebrace (m. 1685)
- Parents: William Feilding, 3rd Earl of Denbigh (father); Mary King (mother)

Basil Feilding, 4th Earl of Denbigh, 3rd Earl of Desmond (1668 – 18 March 1717), styled Viscount Feilding from 1675 to 1685, was an Anglo-Irish peer and courtier.

== Peerage ==
Arms of Feilding

Feilding inherited the English Earldom of Denbigh and the Irish Earldom of Desmond in 1685, from his father, William Feilding, 3rd Earl of Denbigh and 2nd Earl of Desmond. He sat as a Tory in the House of Lords and was a founding member of the Loyal Brotherhood in 1709.

== Family ==
Basil Feilding (also Fielding) was born in 1668 in County Kilkenny, Ireland. He was the son of William Feilding, 3rd Earl of Denbigh, and Mary King, daughter of Sir Robert King.

On 22 June 1695, he married Hester Firebrace (died 1725), daughter of Sir Basil Firebrace, 1st Baronet and Elizabeth Hough.

Denbigh and his wife had six daughters and four sons:

- Lady Mary Feilding (18 November 1696 – 1 October 1732), married physician William Cockburn
- William, Viscount Feilding (26 October 1697 – 2 August 1755)
- Lady Bridget Feilding (14 September 1698 – 29 March 1756)
- Hon. Basil Feilding (18 September 1699 – buried 22 October 1699), died as an infant
- Lady Elizabeth Feilding (4 August 1700 – April 1752)
- Lt.-Col. Hon. Charles Feilding (8 December 1702 – 6 February 1745), married widowed Lady Bridges formerly Elizabeth Palmer, daughter of Sir Thomas Palmer, and was father of the a naval officer of the same name who was involved in the Affair of Fielding and Bylandt.
- Lady Hester Feilding (12 April 1704 – 20 February 1720)
- Hon. George Feilding (14 August 1705 – 6 November 1723)
- Lady Diana Feilding (2 November 1706 – 29 March 1756)
- Lady Frances Feilding (20 January 1709/10 – 3 October 1734) married as first wife to 8th Earl of Winchilsea

Political offices
Preceded by The Viscount Fitzhardinge	Teller of the Exchequer; 1712–1715	Succeeded by Lord William Powlett
Court offices
Preceded by The 3rd Earl of Sandwich	Master of the Horse to Prince George of Denmark; 1694–1697	Succeeded by The 3rd Earl of Sandwich
Honorary titles
Preceded by The Earl of Rutland	Lord Lieutenant of Leicestershire; 1703–1706	Succeeded by The 1st Duke of Rutland
Preceded by The 1st Duke of Rutland	Lord Lieutenant of Leicestershire; 1711–17	Succeeded by The 2nd Duke of Rutland
Peerage of England
Preceded by William Feilding	Earl of Denbigh; 1685–1717	Succeeded by William Feilding
Peerage of Ireland
Preceded by William Feilding	Earl of Desmond; 1685–1717	Succeeded by William Feilding
