= Basil Feilding, 7th Earl of Denbigh =

British peer and courtier (1796–1865)

The Right Honourable The Earl of Denbigh GCH PC
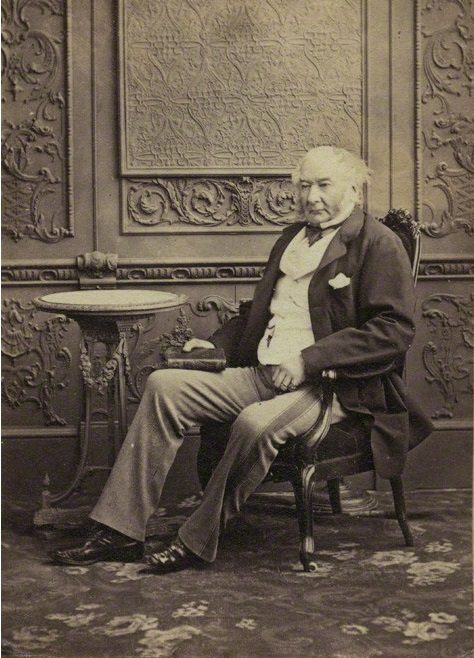
- Lord Denbigh in the 1860s

Master of the Horse to Queen Adelaide
- In office 1834–1837
- Monarch: William IV
- Preceded by: The Earl of Eroll
- Succeeded by: Vacant

Lord Chamberlain to Queen Adelaide
- In office 1833–1834
- Monarch: William IV
- Preceded by: Vacant
- Succeeded by: The Earl Howe

Personal details
- Born: William Basil Percy Feilding; 25 March 1796
- Died: 25 June 1865 (aged 69)
- Spouse: Lady Mary Moreton (m. 1822; died 1842)
- Children: 11; including Rudolph and William
- Parent(s): William Feilding, Viscount Feilding; Anne Catherine Powys
- Education: Trinity College, Cambridge; Eton College

William Basil Percy Feilding, 7th Earl of Denbigh, 6th Earl of Desmond, GCH, PC (25 March 1796 – 25 June 1865), styled Viscount Feilding between 1799 and 1800, was a British peer and courtier.

== Background and education ==
Feilding was the eldest son of William Feilding, Viscount Feilding and his wife, Anne Catherine Powys. He was born at Berwick House (the seat of his maternal grandparents), near Shrewsbury, and educated at Eton and Trinity College, Cambridge, where he graduated MA in 1816.

In 1799, Feilding's father died and his grandfather also a year later, whereupon Feilding inherited the latter's title.

== Career ==
From 1830, Lord Denbigh was a Gentleman of the Bedchamber to William IV. In 1833, he was made a GCH, admitted to the Privy Council and transferred to Queen Adelaide's Household, first as her Lord Chamberlain, then as Master of the Horse. He was made a Deputy Lieutenant for Warwickshire in 1825 and received an honorary degree from Oxford University as DCL in 1835.

== Family ==
Lord Denbigh married Lady Mary Elizabeth Moreton, eldest daughter of Thomas Reynolds-Moreton, 1st Earl of Ducie and Lady Frances Herbert, on 8 May 1822. They had the following issue:

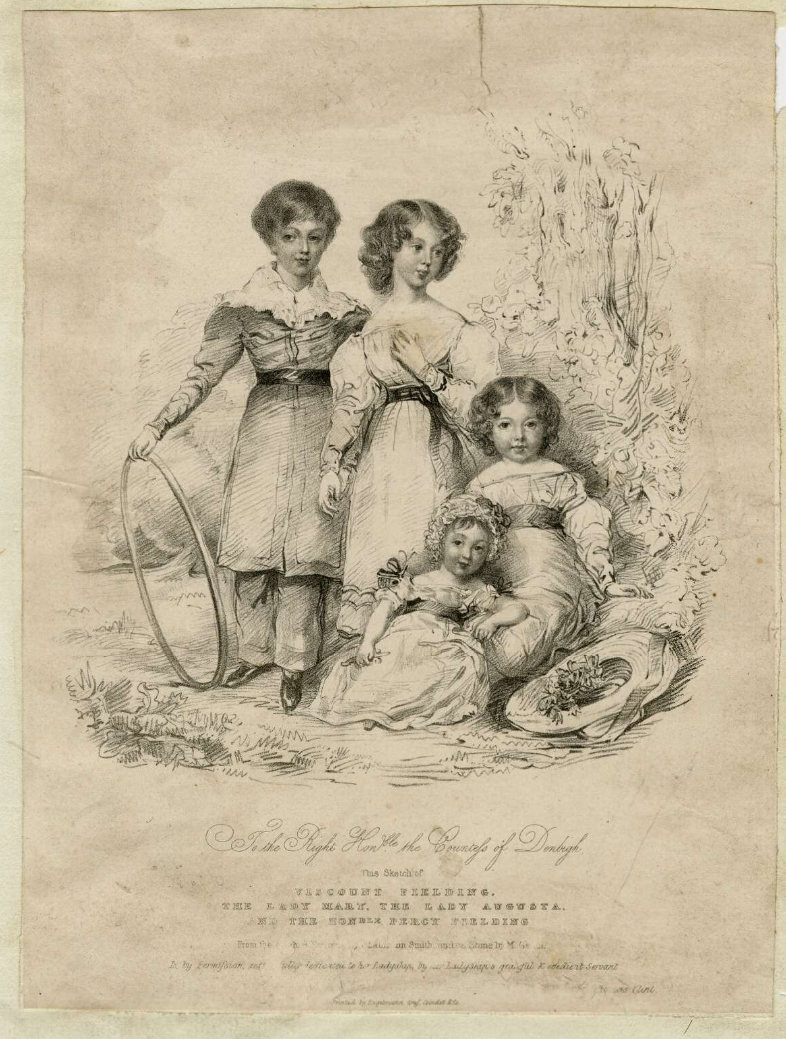
Viscount Rudolf Feilding, Lady Mary, Lady Augusta and Hon Percy Feilding in 1830s

- Rudolph William Basil, Viscount Feilding, later 8th Earl of Denbigh (twin, 1823–1892).
- Lady Mary Frances Catherine Feilding (twin, 1823–1896)
- Hon. Percy Robert Basil Feilding (1827–1904), soldier
- Lady Jane Lissey Harriet Feilding (1829–1912), married Capt. Theophilus John Levett of Wychnor Hall
- Rev. Hon. Charles William Alexander Feilding (1833–1893)
- Gen. Hon. William Henry Adelbert Feilding (1836–1895)
- Lady Adelaide Emily Feilding (1836–1870), married Charles Archibald Murray. They had two sons and two daughters.
- Lady Ida Matilda Alice Feilding (1840–1915), married William Malcolm Low.
- Lady Kathleen Elizabeth Mary Julia (1842–1882), married Charles Meysey Bolton Clive. They had three sons and three daughters, including the diplomat, Sir Robert Clive.

His wife died in 1842 and his eldest daughter Mary became the de facto parent to her siblings. Mary would go on to found the Working Ladies' Guild. Lord Denbigh died in 1865 in London, and his titles passed to his eldest son, Rudolph.

Court offices
Preceded by Vacant (The Earl Howe)	Lord Chamberlain to Queen Adelaide; 1833–1834	Succeeded by The Earl Howe
Preceded by The Earl of Eroll	Master of the Horse to Queen Adelaide; 1834–1837	Succeeded by None
Peerage of England
Preceded by Basil Feilding	Earl of Denbigh; 1800–1865	Succeeded by Rudolph Feilding
Peerage of Ireland
Preceded by Basil Feilding	Earl of Desmond; 1800–1865	Succeeded by Rudolph Feilding
