= William Feilding, 10th Earl of Denbigh =

British peer (1912–1966)

Captain William Rudolph Stephen Feilding, 10th Earl of Denbigh, 9th Earl of Desmond (17 April 1912 – 31 December 1966), was a British peer. He was the son of Rudolph Feilding, Viscount Feilding, heir to the Earldom of Denbigh, and his wife Agnes Imelda Mary Harding (Viscountess Feilding). He was educated at The Oratory School. He fought in the Second World War, having gained the rank of captain in the service of the Coldstream Guards. He held the office of Justice of the Peace for Warwickshire. He died in 1966 at the age of 54.

In 1940, Lord Denbigh married Verena Barbara ('Betty') Price, daughter of Lt.-Col. William Edward Price, of Trevethin, Monmouthshire. They were the parents of Lady Imelda Clare Feilding, and Rollo Feilding, 11th Earl of Denbigh, who succeeded to the earldom.

Peerage of England
Preceded by Rudolph Feilding	Earl of Denbigh; 1939–1966	Succeeded by William Fielding
Peerage of Ireland
Preceded by Rudolph Feilding	Earl of Desmond; 1939–1966	Succeeded by William Fielding
