= Basil Feilding, 6th Earl of Denbigh =

English nobleman and courtier (1719–1800)

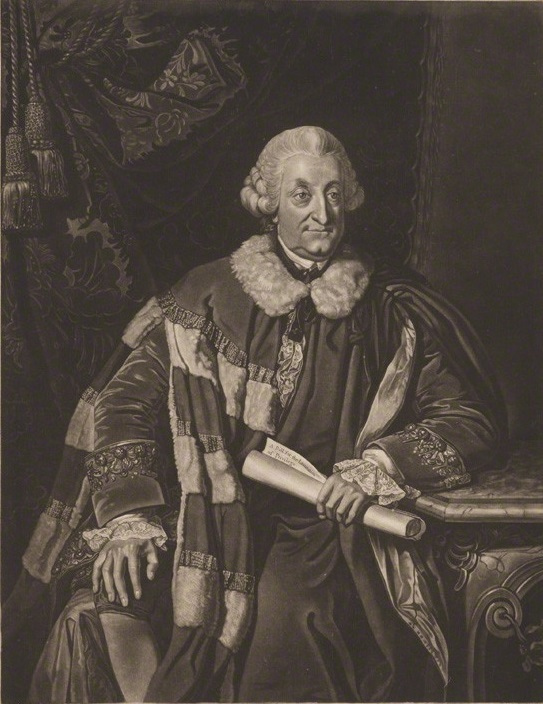
Basil Feilding, 6th Earl of Denbigh

Basil Feilding, 6th Earl of Denbigh and 5th Earl of Desmond (3 January 1719 – 14 July 1800) was an English nobleman and courtier.

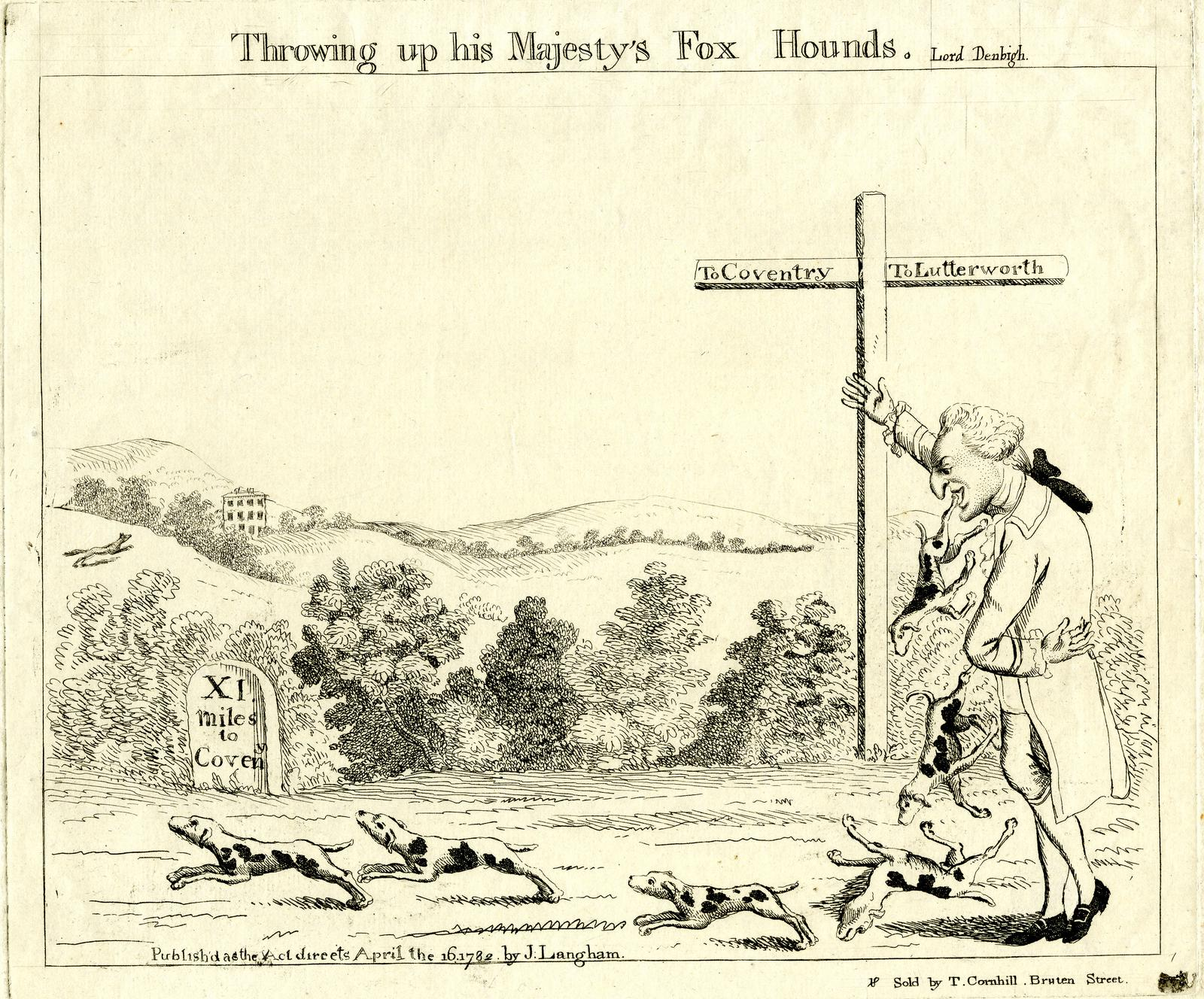
Throwing up his Majesty's fox hounds (1782), a satirical sketch depicting Denbigh in his role as Master of the Royal Harriers and Foxhounds.

He was the son of William Feilding, 5th Earl of Denbigh, and Isabella Haeck de Jong, daughter of Peter Haeck de Jong of Utrecht and Anna Maria van Weede tot Dijkveld en Ratelis. He succeeded to the title of 6th Earl of Denbigh on 2 August 1755.

Lord Denbigh married Mary Cotton, daughter of Sir John Cotton, 6th Baronet, and Jane Burdett, on 12 April 1757. Their first son was William Feilding, Viscount Feilding. Their second son was Charles John Fielding, born 20 December 1761, who published a poem dedicated to his brother titled The Brothers, an Ecologue (1781).

Denbigh was appointed Colonel of the Warwickshire Militia in 1759 and commanded them during their embodiment for home defence during the Seven Years' War, taking particular care for their health. A Tory peer in the House of Lords, he was a board member of the High Tory Loyal Brotherhood and the Birmingham Bean Club.

In 1779, Charles prosecuted James Donally for highway robbery, who had accused him of sexual assault. He was educated at Trinity College, Cambridge, and died abroad unmarried. Basil married, secondly, Sarah Farnham, daughter of Edward Farnham, on 21 July 1783.

Feilding owned the Newnham Paddox estate in Warwickshire. He was Master of the Royal Harriers and Foxhounds from 1762 until 1782, when the post was abolished. Horace Walpole called him "the lowest and most officious of the Court-tools".

Peerage of England
Preceded by William Feilding	Earl of Denbigh; 1755–1800	Succeeded by William Feilding
Peerage of Ireland
Preceded by William Feilding	Earl of Desmond; 1755–1800	Succeeded by William Feilding
