= Anne Campbell Gibson =

- Born: 19 November 1849; Edinburgh
- Died: 21 April 1926 (aged 76); London
- Citizenship: British
- Education: Nurse Training, Nightingale School of Nursing, St. Thomas' Hospital London, 1881.
- Occupations: Nurse and Matron
- Known for: Notable as a poor law nursing reformer, pioneer in the training of workhouse nurses and proponent of infirmaries separate from workhouse.
- Board member of: Council of the College of Nursing Ltd (subsequently the Royal College of Nursing), President of the Midwives Institute (subsequently the Royal College of Midwives).

Anne Campbell Gibson (19 November 1849 – 21 April 1926) was matron of the Birmingham Union Infirmary (1888–1912) and notable for her contributions to workhouse nursing and pioneering the establishment of infirmaries separate from workhouses and staffed with trained nurses.

== Early life ==
Gibson was born in Edinburgh to Anne McDougall and John Gibson (1813–1856), Scotland’s first school inspector. Gibson was one of six children.

== Early nursing career ==
Gibson attended the nurse training school at St.Thomas Hospital in 1881, recruited by Mrs Wardroper and vetted by Florence Nightingale. On completion she was guided by Florence Nightingale to make her nursing career in improving care for the sick in workhouses. In 1882 she was appointed assistant matron at BrownLow Hill Poor Law Infirmary in Liverpool, and subsequently matron in 1887.

== Later nursing career ==
In 1888 Gibson was appointed matron of Birmingham Union Poor Law Infirmary, which housed over 1000 sick, infirm and mentally ill paupers. She introduced training for nurses and the discontinuation of untrained workhouse inmates caring for the sick. She remained matron until 1912, retiring due to ill-health.

Gibson's achievements in improving workhouse nurse training and infirmary care led to her gain a national reputation and delivering lectures at Poor Law and Public Health conferences. She worked closely with Louise Twinning and the Workhouse Infirmary Nursing Association to promote nurse training and separate infirmaries in workhouses. In 1902 she gave evidence to the government committee on workhouse nursing.

On retirement, she moved to London and continued her involvement at a national level of the development of the nursing and midwifery profession. She was an executive committee member of the Workhouse Infirmary Nursing Association, the Association of Hospital Matrons, and the Nurses’ Social Union (later the National Union of Trained Nurses). She was president of the Midwives’ Institute (later the Royal College of Midwives) from 1919–1926. Gibson was a member of the first council of the College of Nursing (later the Royal College of Nursing). Gibson was also an active member of the Voluntary Advisory Nursing Board for the Prison Service.

At the outbreak of World War I, Gibson (then chairman of the London branch of the National Union of Trained Nurses) helped select volunteer nurses for war service. In 1915 she was appointed matron of Beaufort War Hospital in Bristol, retiring within a year because of ill health.

== Death and memorial service ==
Gibson died on 21 April 1926 in Finchley, London and was buried in Edinburgh. A memorial service, held in the chapel at St Thomas’s Hospital, was attended by politicians and national figures in the professions of nursing and midwifery including: Sir Arthur Stanley, Dame Sarah Swift, Dame Alicia Lloyd Still, Miss Rachael Cox-Davies and Dame Rosalind Paget.

The Anne Gibson Meeting Rooms continue to exist in the City Hospital, Birmingham, part of Sandwell and West Birmingham Hospitals NHS trust.
