= Dead-end job =

Job with little chance of advancement

A dead-end job is a job where there is little or no chance of career development and advancement into a better position. If an individual requires further education to progress within their firm, which is difficult to obtain for any reason, this can result in the occupation being classified as a dead-end position.

== Examples ==
=== Occupations ===
==== Miscellaneous occupations ====
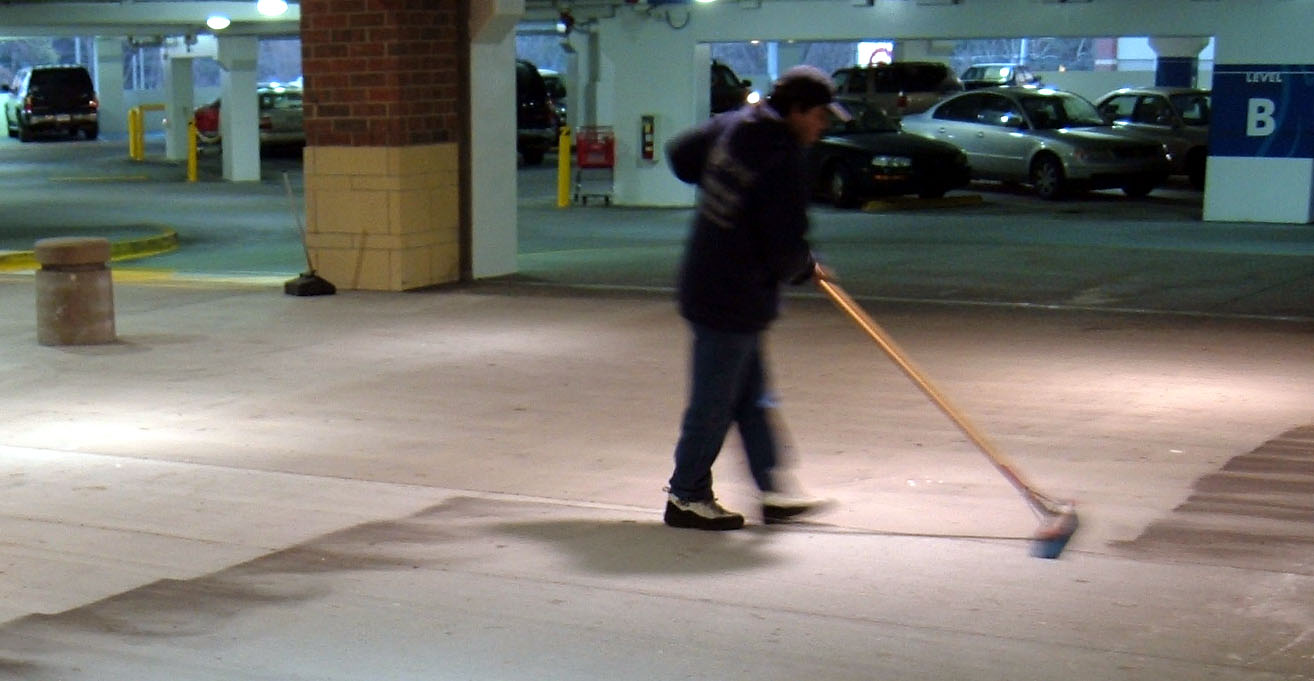
A worker sweeping the floor of a parking garage in Atlanta

Dead-end work is usually regarded as unskilled and the phrase usually applies to those working as shelf stackers, cleaners, call center agents, clerks, or in other menial jobs where the pay is low, and the working hours are long. Furthermore, positions not regarded as menial may nonetheless qualify as dead-end jobs and forms of underemployment. A specialized employee working in a small firm in an underdeveloped local market, for example, might have few opportunities for advancement within the company while simultaneously facing a dearth of opportunities outside it. Most dead-end jobs offer few or no transferable skills and may hinder workers from pursuing careers elsewhere. Dead-end jobs, such as an internal auditing position within a firm, according to CFO.com, should be considered and accepted only if an individual has a pre-calculated exit strategy so that one is not stuck permanently in a position with no opportunities. Law librarians and individuals who join firms that are enlisted into estate or trust work consist of low paying occupations which translate to dead-end jobs with no opportunities for growth.

Few fast-food franchise employees receive any work benefits, and their wages are so low that they are unable to make enough income to supply themselves with life's necessities, especially if they are employed part-time. Part-time employees often need to work two to three jobs to make ends meet or require government assistance, such as food stamps, to live. Most of these fast-food positions are considered dead-end jobs because of the traits listed above, the lack of opportunities within the fast-food realm, and the inability to organize to improve their working conditions. Presently, any positive change in wages and benefits for low-paid fast-food employees that makes the occupation more appealing could signal a shift toward mass layoffs in favor of kiosks and robots. As Andrew Puzder, former CEO of Carl's Jr. and Hardee's, stated: "Robots and kiosks are always polite, they always upsell, they never take a vacation, they never show up late, there's never a slip-and-fall, or an age, sex, or race discrimination case."

Dead-end jobs are not limited to menial labor, retail, or fast food roles. Professional positions in call centers, loss-mitigation underwriting, administrative roles, and clerical work may also offer little to no potential for advancement.

==== Medical field occupations ====
A survey was conducted in Scotland to gather feedback on education and professional issues. The results revealed that only 1 of 25 Registered Mental Nurses (RMNs) would recommend that others pursue this profession. Over half of the survey participants reported that they have reached the highest level of their careers. Additionally, 'reprofiling exercises' and skill mix activities conducted in this profession have led to a decrease in the number of registered nurses in the industry. 66% of respondents also reported that their organizations offer no opportunities for growth, despite their interest in advancing their careers. One out of six participants exclaimed that the position of a Registered Mental Nurse is a dead-end job due to the reasons above and the lack of clear direction in their career path. Because of these setbacks, nurses who have reached their highest capacity show more signs of despondency about their career paths than their counterparts employed at lower levels.

A job residing within the realm of medical inspection is also considered a dead-end job. There is no progression in status, responsibilities, or salary in this field of work. School Medical Officers (SMOs) have experienced dissatisfaction with the lack of progression, as described above, and with the redundancy of work-related activities. The responsibility for medical inspection of schoolchildren mainly entails routine inspection of a large population of children and presents few, if any, features of greater medical interest. The starting salary of these workers is low and inadequate, and they are not supplemented with any substantial raises to compensate for their low starting salaries.

Certified Nursing Assistants (CNAs), also known as long-term care workers, are frontline workers who assist individuals with disabilities with instrumental activities, such as using the phone, and daily activities, such as bathing or eating. It is a challenge to recruit them and retain them as employees. According to the American Health Care Association, in 2002, the turnover rate for this occupation in nursing homes was 71% per year. In 2004, CNAs earned a median hourly wage of only $10.04, which was slightly higher than other occupations, such as grocery cashiers ($7.90) and fast-food cooks ($7.07). They also receive very few fringe benefits. Approximately 16% of CNAs do not have health insurance provided by their firms. Inadequate training provided to CNAs, along with low levels of education, can also affect job tenure, limiting opportunities to grow and learn new material. For the reasons above, the CNA position is also considered a dead-end occupation.

=== Temporary employment/short-term contracts ===
In Europe, temporary employment is widely used and is at the heart of political and economic debates. These temporary contracts and job positions increase labor market flexibility and allow employers to dodge strict government regulations on hiring and firing, as well as avoid regulations on fringe and pay benefits. Previous research confirmed that a wage penalty existed with the utilization of fixed-term contracts. This wage penalty was applied to young workers entering an occupation with low human capital investments and lasted for the first few years of employment, but could lead to a payoff if the worker is viewed as highly productive in their occupation when pursuing a permanent contract. This is known as the learning effect and can be quite large. This form of contract can be a considered a dead-end job if the worker is unable to meet the demands necessary by the employer or company. A study was conducted in the United Kingdom and Germany on temporary employment under fixed-term contracts. The study indicated that for fixed-term contracts, some jobs consisting of a fixed-term contract can lead to permanent employment with good benefits and exist as a stepping stone, while others lead employees within a series of different fixed-term contracts and positions with little room for improvement, which, in essence, is another form of a dead-end job.

In countries such as Italy, Spain, and France, there is a dramatic increase in temporary positions and short-term contracts due to the employer-side benefit of being able to lay off temporary employees without restrictions or incurring statutory redundancy payments. As a result, the number of temporary workers in the workforce doubled between 1985 and 1997. Temporary jobs do come at a cost. There is concern about the lack of career advancement opportunities for temporary workers and the quality of these positions. Case study findings confirm that employer enthusiasm in the workplace has decreased due to the use of temporary jobs with dead-end characteristics, resulting in low motivation and retention among such employees within a firm.

A study was conducted by Alison L. Booth, Marco Francesconi and Jeff Frank which concluded that individuals participating in seasonal, casual or fixed-term employment report that they have not received the work-related training necessary for the occupation and experience lower levels of job satisfaction in comparison to permanent ones. The study concluded that there is evidence that temporary jobs can be a stepping stone to a permanent job within a firm. The median time in a temporary position before such a switch ranges from 18 months to 3.5 years and depends on the individual's gender and the type of contract (fixed-term or seasonal). Seasonal/casual positions offer very little chance of obtaining a permanent position and are often categorized as dead-end positions. Fixed-term contracts have a higher likelihood of transitioning to a permanent one; however, males experience a permanent earnings loss during the transition compared with males who started in a permanent position from the beginning. However, females within a fixed-term position fully catch up to the wages of their permanent position counterparts.

== History ==
Since the 1970s, occupations in many industrialized nations, such as the United States, have become less secure. As the traditional job hierarchy within a firm deteriorates and companies downsize due to unexpected circumstances such as a recession or employer changes (both involuntary and voluntary), reductions in job security become more frequent. Instead of working for one employer and being promoted within a single company, employees are climbing the corporate ladder by switching employers. Because of this, many employees cannot expect to reside within the same firm for the next 15 to 20 years. Based on research conducted by Anne-Kathrin Kronberg at Emory University, the externalization of job mobility affects gender disparities depending on whether individuals work in bad or good occupations and whether they leave their firms voluntarily. If an individual leaves a job voluntarily, the gender gap closes fastest in a benign occupation, whereas in a dead-end job, it remains stagnant. If a worker leaves a job involuntarily, gender disparities run narrow within bad jobs. For good jobs, the gender gap initially closes but reopens swiftly in the 1990s. The study's definition of "good" or "bad" was whether the occupation provided pension plans and health insurance to their employees in addition to whether the individual's earnings were above the federal poverty threshold of 120 percent.

Before 1990, individuals with disabilities were subject to discrimination by being denied equal job opportunities, companies failing to provide such individuals with reasonable accommodations, being assigned to dead-end classified occupations, and being underutilized as a whole. The phrase "individual with a disability" references a person who has either a mental or physical impairment that limits the ability to perform one or several major life activities, or is regarded to have or has had a record of an impairment or disability. On July 26, 1992, the Americans with Disabilities Act of 1990 (ADA) took effect, assisting individuals with disabilities by eliminating employment barriers so they could fully participate in society and receive the same job opportunities as any other individual.

== Psychological effects ==
One possible side effect of being stationed in a dead-end job for too long is the feeling of a lack of motivation and boredom. Another possible side effect can be a short temper, replacing the patience that the worker once had when first starting the position. The lack of motivation experienced by individuals in a dead-end job can lead to discouragement in their career path and cause their performance to suffer, either by taking longer to complete tasks or by making more mistakes due to reduced concentration.

All of these characteristics can lead an individual to an occupational crisis state. An occupational crisis consists of an individual demonstrating a state of mixed negative thoughts and emotions consisting mainly of work-related anxiety and frustration, feelings of reaching a dead-end within their career, negative interpersonal relationships and experiences within the workplace, and the consistent consideration of a career change due to making previous incorrect job choices.

The Occupational Crisis Scale was created to help employees determine whether they were at a dead end in their careers. Three studies were performed to confirm the validity of the Occupational Crisis Scale with an assorted number of Finnish workers (53% of them female) in various occupations such as Police officers, Firefighters, private caretakers, labor welfare advisors and nurses. 58% of individuals were ranked within the occupation crisis state based on this study and a preliminary study amongst vocational counseling clients.

To remedy these psychological issues stemming from dead-end jobs and their related work stress, vocational help can be obtained so that problems do not continue to escalate or accumulate. For some individuals, more time may be needed to consider what they desire in their work life, and the use of occasional sick time, education, or vacation could help alleviate their occupational crisis. For other workers, it may require a change in their work tasks, occupation within their firm, or a completely different job for them to experience a more satisfying life. Vocational help can also assist workers in developing better coping skills, which help them manage stress and anxiety across all facets of life.

== See also ==
- Bullshit job
- Critique of work
- Freeter
- McJob
- Precariat
- Underemployment
- Tang ping ("lying flat")
- Working poor
