= Lady Mary Feilding =

British founder of the Working Ladies' Guild (1823–1896)

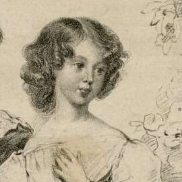
- Born: Lady Mary Frances Catherine Feilding; 9 April 1823; Nympsfield, Gloucestershire
- Died: 24 April 1896 (aged 73); Bickley, Kent
- Occupation: Philanthropist

Lady Mary Frances Catherine Feilding (9 April 1823 – 24 April 1896) was an English aristocrat and founder of the Working Ladies' Guild.

== Life ==
Feilding and her twin brother Rudolph were born in 1823 at Woodchester Park in Nympsfield, Gloucestershire. Her father was William Basil Percy Feilding, 7th Earl of Denbigh. She became the de-facto parent to her siblings after her mother, Mary Elizabeth Kitty, died in 1842 while her twin brother inherited her father's title and became Rudolph Feilding, 8th Earl of Denbigh in 1865. Her younger brother was General William Feilding.

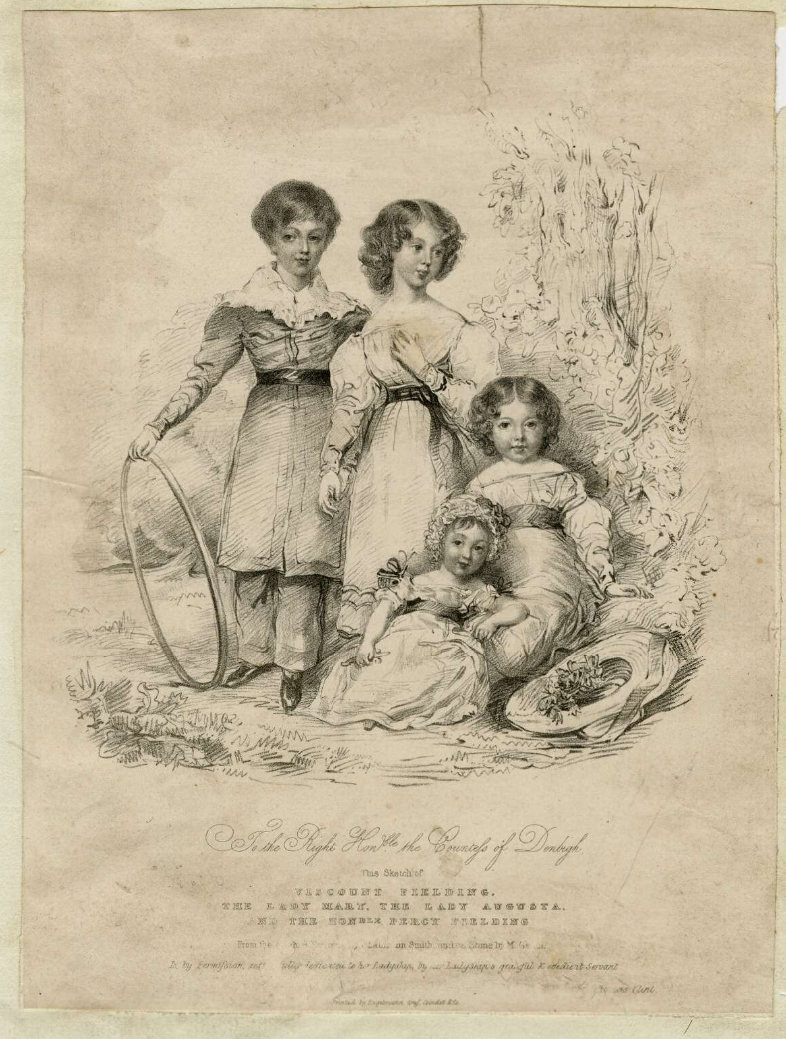
Viscount Rudolf Feilding, Lady Mary, Lady Augusta, and Hon. Percy Feilding.

She was the philanthropic founder and President of the Working Ladies' Guild in January 1877 with the Bishop of London John Jackson as patron. The idea had come from a letter to the first issue of Louisa Hubbard's Women's Gazette. This was a self-help organisation that offered assistance to unmarried or widowed upper class women who had not been brought up to be self sufficient. They were described as "poor victims of a false code of honour and gentility" by Mayo. The organisation offered help via "associates" of the guild and in time it was hoped that they would in time become associates themselves. Associates would supply time and money and refer on other women who needed the guild's assistance. The founding committee members of the guild were Jessie Boucherett, Lady Eden, Louisa Hubbard, Lady Knightley and from the Royal College of Needlework Louisa Wade.

By 1879, there were said to be 1,000 associates and their details were recorded at the Guild's main offices in London. The guild used the Woman's Gazette and Work and Leisure to improve their social profile. Sub-offices grew in number with one opening in Cannes and more successfully in Northumberland until the organisation decided to re-centre its activities. The help given was not money but tickets for a concert or to pay for someone to go on a course. In 1883 one associate funded a home for elderly ladies. Feilding herself organised reasonably priced accommodation. She bought a building in Campden Hill which was let at reasonable prices and one floor had ten rooms at low prices. One was kept for emergencies but the other nine were attached to the Guild and the tenants could decide to have their dinners included for a reasonable fee. The guild worked with other charitable organisations including the Society for Promoting the Employment of Women.

The Guild was wound up in 2020 when the last of its residential properties, in Highgate, was sold and the few remaining residents were relocated to other care homes.

The archives of the Guild are now kept at the Highgate Literary and Scientific Institution in north London.

Feilding died on 24 April 1896 and she was buried at the family estate of Newnham Paddox near Rugby.
