= Rosabella Paulina Fynes Clinton =

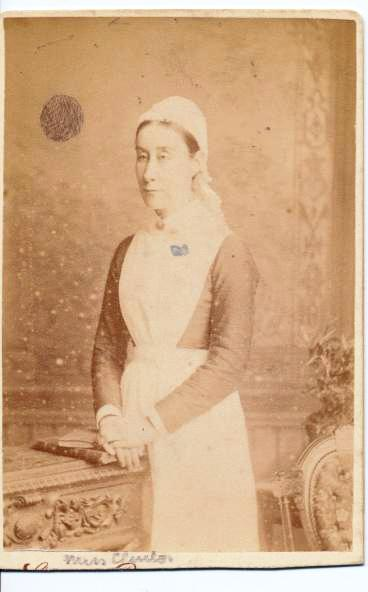
- Born: 1853; Bedford
- Died: 1918 (aged 64–65); London
- Burial place: Brompton Cemetery
- Education: Leicester Infirmary; The London Hospital
- Occupations: Nurse, Masseur [physiotherapist] and Midwife

Rosabella Paulina Fynes Clinton (1853-1918) was a trained nurse, masseuse (physiotherapist) and midwife, and a nursing and midwifery reformer. She was a council member of the Midwifery Institute (now the Royal College of Midwives) and was secretary for over twelve years. Clinton was a founding member of the Incorporated Society of Trained Masseuses' (now the Chartered Society of Physiotherapists).

== Early life ==
Rosabella, or Paulina as she was known later in life, was the youngest child of 8 sons and 5 daughters born to her father Charles and mother Rosabella. Her father was a magistrate, clergyman and civil engineer. Clinton was born on 25 January 1853 in Bedford, Bedfordshire. Her parents died when she was 19. As she had no financial security her siblings offered that she could live with them, but she started nurse training as soon as she was old enough. One of her brother's, Eustace, was headmaster of Wimborne Grammar School 1880-1907.

== Career ==
Clinton trained at Leicester Royal Infirmary, and had also briefly worked at Guys Hospital, London. She trained as a midwife at the British Hospital, Endell Street in London and obtained the Certificate of the Obstetrical Society of London. In 1882 she was appointed as a ward sister at The London Hospital by the matron Eva Luckes. Clinton resigned a year later, but returned again in 1884 and remained there until 1890 when she was seriously ill, possibly with influenza which she caught during the Russian Flu Pandemic. After two years of recuperation Clinton returned to The London in March 1892, and was appointed assistant matron in September 1892. She held this post until she resigned in June 1895 when she was appointed as a visitor for the Trained Nurses Association to Workhouse Infirmaries.

In February 1896 she was appointed as Lady Superintendent of the National Hospital for Paralysed and Epileptic, Queen’s Square, London. But she only held the post for one month because the committee rescinded her appointment as they had overlooked a current member of nursing staff for the position. Although they offered Clinton a generous £100 settlement she donated it to the hospital funds.

Clinton learned massage at The London Hospital, and was a founding member for the Society of Trained Masseuses. She collaborated with Rosalind Paget on the Midwives Registration Bill, and following the successful enactment of the 1902 Midwives Act, she was registrant number 3 on The Midwives Roll. She was also a teacher and an examiner for the Central Midwives Board. She was a member of the Nurses Club in Buckingham Street where she trained nurses in massage therapy.

== Retirement ==
Clinton shared a flat with Rosalind Paget and other friends in Sloane's Court, London, where she died on 16 September 1918 and was buried in Brompton Cemetery five days later. She died after a short illness but had been unwell for several years prior to her death. Many colleagues attended her funeral including eminent nurses Alicia Lloyd Still, matron of St Thomas's Hospital and Alice Blomfield, matron of Queen Charlotte's maternity hospital. Clinton is remembered on Dame Rosalind Paget's memorial stone. After her death the Midwive's Institute inaugurated the annual Fynes-Clinton Memorial Lecture in her memory.
