= Queen's Institute of Community Nursing =

British charity

The Queen's Institute of Community Nursing
- Abbreviation: QICN
- Formation: 1887
- Type: NGO
- Legal status: Charity incorporated by Royal Charter
- Headquarters: London, W1
- Region served: England, Wales, Northern Ireland
- Official language: English
- Chief Executive: Dr Crystal Oldman CBE
- Budget: £1m
- Staff: 27
- Website: https://qicn.org.uk/

The Queen's Institute of Community Nursing (QICN) is a charity that works to improve the nursing care of people in their own homes in England, Wales, and Northern Ireland. It does not operate in Scotland, where the Queen's Nursing Institute Scotland performs a similar function. The QICN is also affiliated to the Queen's Institute of District Nursing in Ireland. The QICN is a member of the International Council of Nurses. In March 2025, The Queen’s Nursing Institute (QNI) was re-named as The Queen’s Institute of Community Nursing (QICN).

== History ==
In 1859, Liverpool merchant and philanthropist William Rathbone employed a nurse named Mary Robinson to care for his wife at home during her final illness. After his wife's death, Rathbone decided to employ Robinson to nurse people in their own homes who could not afford medical care. The success of this early experiment encouraged him to campaign for more nurses to be employed in the community.

Elizabeth Malleson was concerned to find that there was little local service of nurses for pregnant women in the 1880s. Malleson arranged for a trained nurse and midwife to be available to serve the people of Gotherington. Malleson's scheme was not the first but she decided to form a national organisation and her appeal for help brought her into contact with Lady Lucy Hicks-Beech. She was the wife of Michael Hicks Beach, 1st Earl St Aldwyn, and they gathered enough support to launch a Rural Nursing Association. This was despite the opposition of Florence Nightingale.

These were the beginning of organised district nursing. By the end of the 19th century, with the approval of Queen Victoria, the movement became a national voluntary organisation responsible for setting standards and training nurses. In 1887 'the women of England' raised a Jubilee Fund of £70,000 to mark Victoria's Golden Jubilee. The Queen announced that the money should be used for nursing, and Queen Victoria's Jubilee Institute for Nurses (QVJIN) was chartered in 1889. Elizabeth Malleson's nurses became the Rural Nursing Division in 1891 with Malleson as its secretary. Rosalind Paget was the main organisation's first superintendent, and later inspector-general. Queen Alexandra agreed to be a patron in 1901, and a Queen has been patron of the charity ever since. From 1928 to 1973 It was known as The Queen's Institute of District Nursing (QIDN) 1928-1973, as the Queen's Nursing Institute (QNI) 1973-2025, and as The Queen’s Institute of Community Nursing (QICN) from March 2025.

== Notable staff ==
A number of the early superintendents and inspectors of the Queen Victoria's Jubilee Institute for Nurses trained at The London Hospital under Eva Luckes. These included:

- Sarah Ann Andrew (1856-1942), worked at The London. Superintendent of Gateshead Nursing Association 1896-1912.
- Rosalind Paget, who also trained at the Westminster Hospital. Paget was the first Superintendent and later an Inspector General, and William Rathbone's niece.
- Josephine Bourdillon (1863-1937), served variously as an Assistant Lady Superintendent, Inspector and lastly as Superintendent in Hackney, 1907-1920.
- Sarah Edith Butler (1872-1916), served as an Assistant and Acting County Superintendent, in Lincolnshire, before becoming County Superintendent, Sussex, 1912-1915. Butler 'accidentally' drowned in 1916 whilst serving as a sister in the Queen Alexandra's Imperial Military Nursing Service in Alexandria.
- Norah Farrant (1880-1972), Assistant County Superintendent, and County Superintendent, Sussex 1912-1915, and Variously Inspector of: Eastern, Lancashire, Northern and London Areas, 1918–1928. Inspector of County Nursing Associations, 1928–1935.
- Agnes May Stanford (1870-1929), Assistant Superintendent, both in London and East Sussex, and County Superintendent, East Sussex, 1919-1921.
- Alice Maud Mersham Tilbury (1857-1936), Superintendent, Essex County Nursing Association, July 1901 – April 1926.
- In 1944 Eleanor Jeanette Merry formed the education department of the Queen’s Institute. This led to the focus on continuing professional development with courses and refresher days organised for district nurses, tutors and health visitors. She became General Superintendent of the Queen’s Institute in 1951 until 1958.

Notable representatives of the QICN include:

- Elena Richmond who represented the QNI on the Nurses Salaries Committee chaired by Lord Rushcliffe which published two reports in 1943.

== Campaigns ==
One in four people over the age of 75 in the United Kingdom need a district nurse's care at home, rising to 1 in 2 people over the age of 85. District nurses visit more than 2.6 million people a year (c. 2011) but by that time the number of trained district nurses had fallen to fewer than 10,000 in England and has continued to decline ever since (QNI, 2022). The number of health care assistants - trained to do specific tasks but not educated or registered as nurses - had more than doubled. It was against this background that the charity launched the 'Right Nurse, Right Skills' campaign.

== Queen's Nurses ==
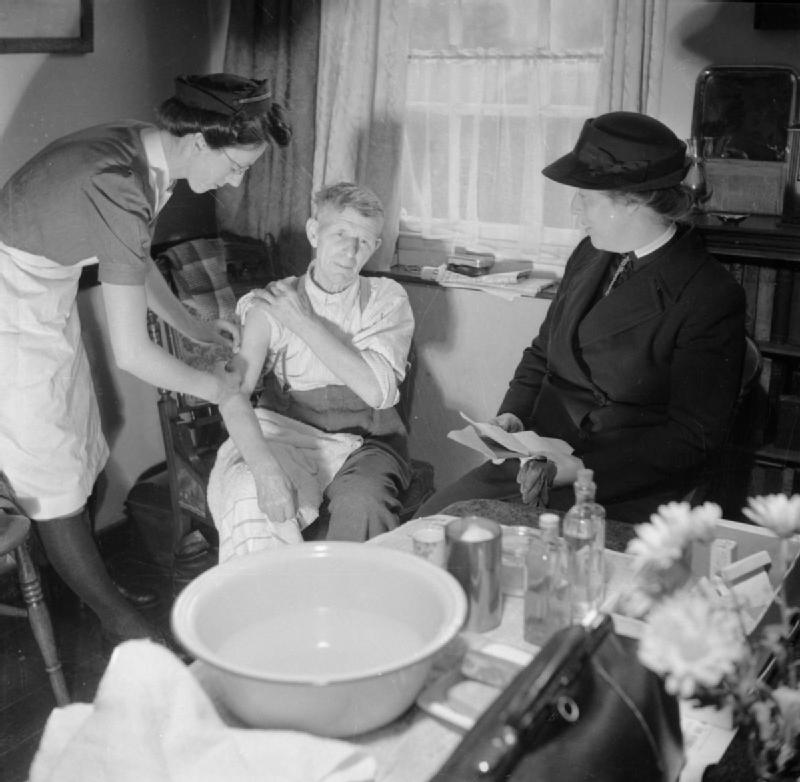
Training a Queen's Nurse in 1944

The title ‘Queen’s Nurse’ was first given to district nurses who had trained with the QICN and undertaken its written examination. The institute continued to award this qualification until 1968, when nurse education was taken into higher education and the title fell into abeyance. The QICN re-instated the title of Queen's Nurse in 2007 after a gap of 40 years with the approval of the charity's patron, the Queen. The modern Queen's Nurse title is not a qualification, but it is awarded following a rigorous anonymous assessment process, requiring applicants to submit details of their professional career, essays in reflective practice, and references from patients, managers and colleagues. It is available to all nurses who have worked in community settings for over five years and is not restricted to district nurses. In 2021, there are around 1700 Queen's Nurses in England, Wales and Northern Ireland. The Queen's Nursing Institute Scotland (QNIS) has also reintroduced the title of Queen's Nurse in a different form, using its own assessment criteria.

== Programmes and services ==
=== Leadership Development ===
The charity has opportunities for senior nurses working in the community who wish to progress personally and professionally.

=== Standards for Specialist Practitioner Qualifications ===
The QICN develops voluntary standards of education and practice for community nursing specialisms. This area of work expanded after 2022 following the review by the Nursing and Midwifery Council of specialist practice.

=== Personal support ===
The charity provides grants to nurses in financial need, and educational grants to support nurses taking accredited community nursing courses. In 2020, during the COVID-19 pandemic, the QICN launched TalkToUs, a confidential listening service for community nurses to be able to speak to someone about work or personal challenges. The QICN also has a programme called Keep in Touch, that puts working and retired Queen's Nurses together for regular phone contact.

=== Community Nursing Innovation Programme ===
Since 1990, the QICN has supported hundreds of nurse-led projects through its Community Nurse Innovation Programme (CNIP). Dissemination of project results also helps nurses in other areas to learn from and implement new ideas. The projects—led by community nurses, midwives or health visitors—set up new services or improved ways of working. Grants of up to £5000 are available, in addition to a full year of professional development and support. All project leaders benefit from a professional development programme.

=== Homeless and Inclusion Health Programme ===
The QICN launched the Homeless Health Programme in 2007, piloted with funding from the Big Lottery Fund until 2010, to offer support to all community nurses, health visitors, midwives and other health professionals working with individuals and families without a secure home. This initiative established a national network of homeless health professionals, offering training events, specialist publications and other support. The network has continued to grow and develop since its launch, and seeks to share knowledge and share practice for professionals who work with a wide range of people who may typically experience barriers to accessing health services, for example Gypsy, Roma and Traveller communities.

=== QNI Heritage project ===
In 2009, the QICN launched a new website showcasing the history of community nursing since 1859, when the first District Nurse was employed in England. This website has since been updated and rebranded.

== Policy ==
Healthcare policy is a key activity for the QICN. The QICN works to influence decision-makers across England, Wales and Northern Ireland on health care policy including primary care, public health, nursing education, regulation and skill mix and issues such as services for homeless people and reducing health inequalities. To do so, the QICN contributes to stakeholder meetings, responds to national consultations, takes up issues raised by local projects where it appears they may have wider significance, and provides examples and information to policy-makers.

== Publications ==
In 2009 the QICN (as QNI) published a report ‘2020 Vision – focusing on the future of district nursing’ that set out a clear and focused look at what modern district nursing is and does. In it, the QICN shared a vision of a future when “many more people are treated at home, technology is exploited to the full to help deliver care and maintain independence, and the relationship between the individual, their family or carers and the nurse is key to building the trust and confidence people need to remain at home as long as possible”. The report outlined recommendations for the practice, education, training and management of community nursing in the future. An updated report was published in 2014 and this has been the inspiration for subsequent reports on district nursing and other community specialisms, including general practice nursing, new technology in community nursing, and inclusion healthcare.

In 2019, the QICN (again as QNI) alongside the Royal College of Nursing, published a new report, Outstanding Models of District Nursing, that highlighted the fall in the number of full time equivalent qualified district nurses, which is shown in national workforce statistics.

== International Community Nursing Observatory ==
In November 2019, the charity launched the International Community Nursing Observatory (ICNO) to further its research and data gathering objectives, particularly around evidence for the community nursing workforce in the UK.

== Awards ==
The charity makes a number of awards to individual community nurses each year and these are traditionally presented at the Awards Ceremony. The criteria for each award are available on the charity's website; some are open to individual applications while others require nomination by colleagues.

The Queen Elizabeth the Queen Mother Award for Outstanding Service
Founded in 1994, this award is presented to nurses who have given exceptional service to patients through nursing practice in any aspect of community or primary health care.

The Long Service Award
This award is given to nurses who have worked for 21 years or more in the community.

The Philip Goodeve-Docker Memorial Prize This prize is presented to an outstanding student at each university offering the District Nursing Specialist Practitioner Qualification programme. The prize is named in memory of a young man who died while raising funds for the charity, on an expedition to cross the Greenland ice sheet.

The Dora Rylance Memorial Prize A prize for outstanding students of Health Visiting SCHPN programmes.

The Ellen Mary Memorial Prize A prize for outstanding students of General Practice Nursing Specialist Practitioner Qualification programmes.

The International Community Nurse of the Year Award An award created in 2021 for internationally educated nurses who are now working in England.

The William Rathbone X Annual Award An award for Excellence in the Executive Nurse Leadership of Community Nursing Services

== Branding ==
In February 2011, the QICN (when as The QNI) created a new modern brand. As part of this process, it re-emphasized its mission to focus on protecting and improving the standards of nursing care at home. The old logo, in use for more than 120 years, is still used in certain circumstances.

In March 2025 as part of its renaming to as The Queen’s Institute of Community Nursing (QICN), branding was updated in line with the new name.

== Funding ==
The QICN's main sources of funding are from grant-making organisations, donations and investment income. The QICN is not part of the NHS, and receives no regular Government funding. The QICN's most important financial contributor on an annual basis is the National Garden Scheme, which was created by the QICN and which has supported the charity since 1927.

== See also ==
- Victorian Order of Nurses, Canada
