= Royal College of Midwives =

UK trade union

RCM
- Royal College of Midwives
- Formation: 1881; 145 years ago
- Location: United Kingdom
- Members: ▼48,335 (2024)
- General Secretary: Gill Walton
- Chair: Melissa Davis
- Affiliations: TUC; STUC; ICTU
- Website: rcm.org.uk

The Royal College of Midwives (RCM) is a British midwives organisation founded in 1881 by Louisa Hubbard and Zepherina Smith. It has existed under its present name since 1947 and is the United Kingdom's only trade union or professional organisation for midwives and those that support them. The organisation is a professional association and a trade union that provides guidance and support for midwives both socially and professionally. The RCM is the only midwifery organisation in the United Kingdom run by and for midwives. Gill Walton is the current chief executive, and Sophie Russell is the current president. As of April 2025, the organisation currently has over 50,000 members and is the largest maternity entity in the world.

== History ==
The precursor of the College was the Matron's Aid Society later known as the Trained Midwives Registration Society, set up in London in 1881 by Louisa Hubbard, Zepherina Veitch, and some of her colleagues. It aimed to "raise the efficiency and improve the status of midwifery" and to petition parliament for their recognition. They wanted to give mothers and their children the proper care they longed for. Shortly afterwards its name was changed to the Midwives Institute and there followed a period of about twenty years of campaigning before the government was persuaded to regulate the profession. The Midwives Act was passed in 1902 and after that, it was illegal for any unqualified person in England or Wales to act as a midwife. Similar legislation was implemented in Scotland in 1915 and in Northern Ireland in 1922.

The training of midwives was done by the Central Midwives Board. Lectures were given and a journal was produced. The fees charged by midwives were low and if a doctor was needed to assist at the birth, further fees were required by him. By 1901 the Institute had established a scheme for providing insurance for midwives who were forced to be in quarantine after attending a case of puerperal fever. They had to defend themselves at inquests or pay fees to doctors. By 1919, local authorities were required to pay the doctor's fee and then recoup the sum back from the family. The Institute continued to campaign and in 1936, the Midwives Act was passed. This encouraged training, introduced a diploma for those who passed an examination, and instituted five-yearly refresher courses. The Institute undertook a study into why the maternal death rate was so high. In 1941, it changed its name to the College of Midwives, and in 1947, it was given a royal charter by King George VI. By 1955, the Royal College of Midwives had over 10,000 members. This led C. S. B. Wentworth-Stanley, a chairman on the appeal and building committee in the United Kingdom, to request a new building for the organisation's headquarters.

== Mission statement ==
The Royal College of Midwives supports its members by guiding and training them to succeed in the professional world. The association's mission statement is to "enhance the confidence, professional practice and influence of midwives for the benefit of childbearing women and their families."

=== Pillars of service ===
- Promoting midwifery, quality maternity services, and professional standards
- Supporting its members, individually and collectively
- Influencing on behalf of members and the women and families they care for

== Organisation ==
The Royal College of Midwives has a Board consisting of midwifery support workers and qualified midwives who govern and manage the organisation. It also has a charitable organisation, the RCM Trust, which funds research, provides information to the public, provides education and training to its members, and organises meetings, conferences, and other events. The RCM Trust has a trading arm and runs the Benevolent Fund to assist members in need of financial assistance.

The organisation at its current state has more than 50,000 members including both professional and student midwives, along with maternity support workers. This makes the RCM the most expansive midwifery association in the world.

== International membership ==
The Royal College of Midwives is part of many international organisations across the world. The college's goal is to "provide leadership and bring the voice of midwives to other professional organisations." RCM has delegates that have leadership roles in each of these organisations.

=== List of international bodies ===
- International Confederation of Midwives (ICM)
- European Association of Midwives (EMA)
- European Forum for National Nursing and Midwifery Associations (EFNNMA)

== Industrial action ==
The Royal College of Midwives staged its first-ever strike on 13 October 2014 in protest against the decision that only National Health Service (NHS) staff at the top of their pay band would receive a 1% pay increase, while the remaining 55% of the workforce would only get annual incremental rises. The RCM believed this decision was unfair and unjustified. Their purpose in participating in the strike was to advocate for equitable pay for its members and to highlight the vital role midwives play in the NHS.

== Leadership ==
The Royal College of Midwives has two leadership positions: the chief executive is in charge of the day-to-day management of the college, and the president is the ceremonial figurehead and main ambassadorial representative who is elected by members of the college.

=== List of chief executives ===
- Dame Karlene Davis (1994-2008)
- Dame Cathy Warwick (2008 to 2017)
- Gill Walton (2017 to present)

=== List of presidents ===
- Margaret Wheeler (1987 to 1994)
- Maggie O'Brien (2004 to 2008)
- Liz Stephens (2008 to 2012)
- Professor Lesley Page (2012 to 2017)
- Kathryn Gutteridge (2017 to 2021)
- Rebeccah Davies (2021 to 2024)
- Sophie Russell (2024 to present)

=== Historic leadership ===
- Rosalind Paget was one of the founding members of the Midwives Institute (later known as RCM) in 1881.
- Rosabella Paulina Fynes Clinton was also a founding member and was Secretary of the Midwives Institute for over 12 years. She was Midwife No. 3.
- Zepherina Smith was the first president of the Midwives Institute, and her work led to the eventual Royal College of Midwives.
- Anne Campbell Gibson was the president of the Midwives Institute from 1919 to 1926.
- Gladys Beaumont Carter led the organisation in the 1930s. Her research led to the first university department for nursing in Europe.
