= Eliza Tinsley =

English businessperson

Eliza Tinsley, née Butler (1813–1882) was an English businessperson. She was the founder of the Eliza Tinsley Furniture, also known as the or Eliza Tinsley & Company, Ltd.

== Life and career ==
Eliza Tinsley was born in Wolverhampton, Staffordshire, as the daughter of file maker Benjamin Butler (d. 1827) and Ann Shaw (d. 1829). She married Thomas Tinsley in 1839, and lived at The Limes in Sedgley with her husband and six children.

In 1851, she was widowed and inherited the nail-making business from her husband, and developed it in to a substantial furniture company. In 1871, the company had 4,000 employees producing nails, chains, rivets and anchors.

== Legacy ==
Eliza Tinsley has a ward named after her at Rowley Regis Hospital.
