= Rowley Regis Hospital =

- Sandwell and West Birmingham Hospitals NHS Trust
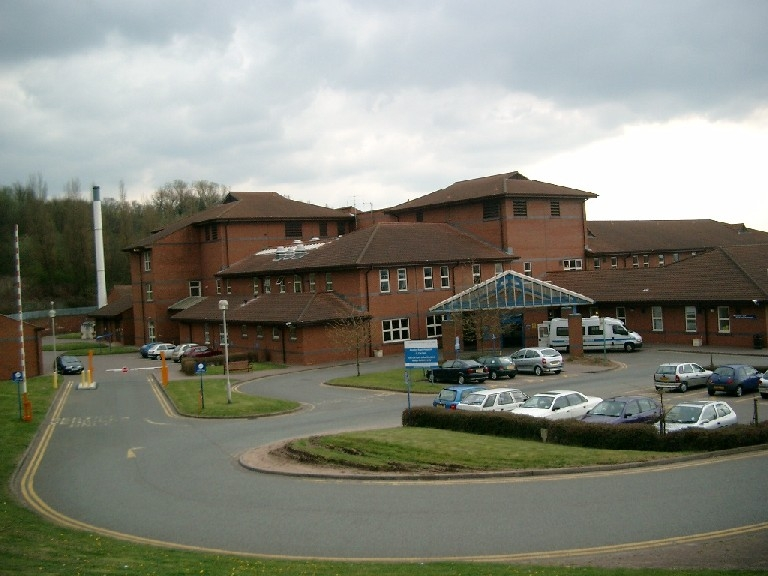
- Rowley Regis Hospital

- Shown in West Midlands

Geography
- Location: Rowley Regis, Birmingham, West Midlands, England
- Coordinates: 52°28′51.7″N 2°3′9.2″W

Organisation
- Care system: NHS
- Type: District General

Services
- Emergency department: No

History
- Founded: 1994

Links
- Lists: Hospitals in England

Rowley Regis Community Hospital is a hospital in Rowley Regis, West Midlands, England. It is managed by the Sandwell and West Birmingham Hospitals NHS Trust.

== History ==
The hospital was opened by the Duchess of Kent in 1994. Rowley Regis Hospital along with City Hospital, Birmingham and Sandwell General Hospital, West Bromwich formed the Sandwell and West Birmingham Hospitals NHS Trust in 2002. The Chancellor of the Exchequer, George Osborne, visited the hospital in July 2014.
