= Chartered Society of Physiotherapy =

UK trade union

- Founded: 1894; 132 years ago (as Society of Trained Masseuses)
- Type: Professional Organisation
- Purpose: Physiotherapy
- Headquarters: Chancery Exchange, 10 Furnival Street, London EC4A 1AB,
- Region served: United Kingdom
- Members: ▲65,165 (2024)
- Affiliations: TUC; STUC
- Website: csp.org.uk

The Chartered Society of Physiotherapy (CSP) is the professional body and trade union for physiotherapists in the United Kingdom.

Founded in 1894, the Chartered Society of Physiotherapy has grown to become the profession's largest membership organisation with 65,000 members.

Queen Mary was royal patron from 1916 until her death in 1953, when Queen Elizabeth II became royal patron.

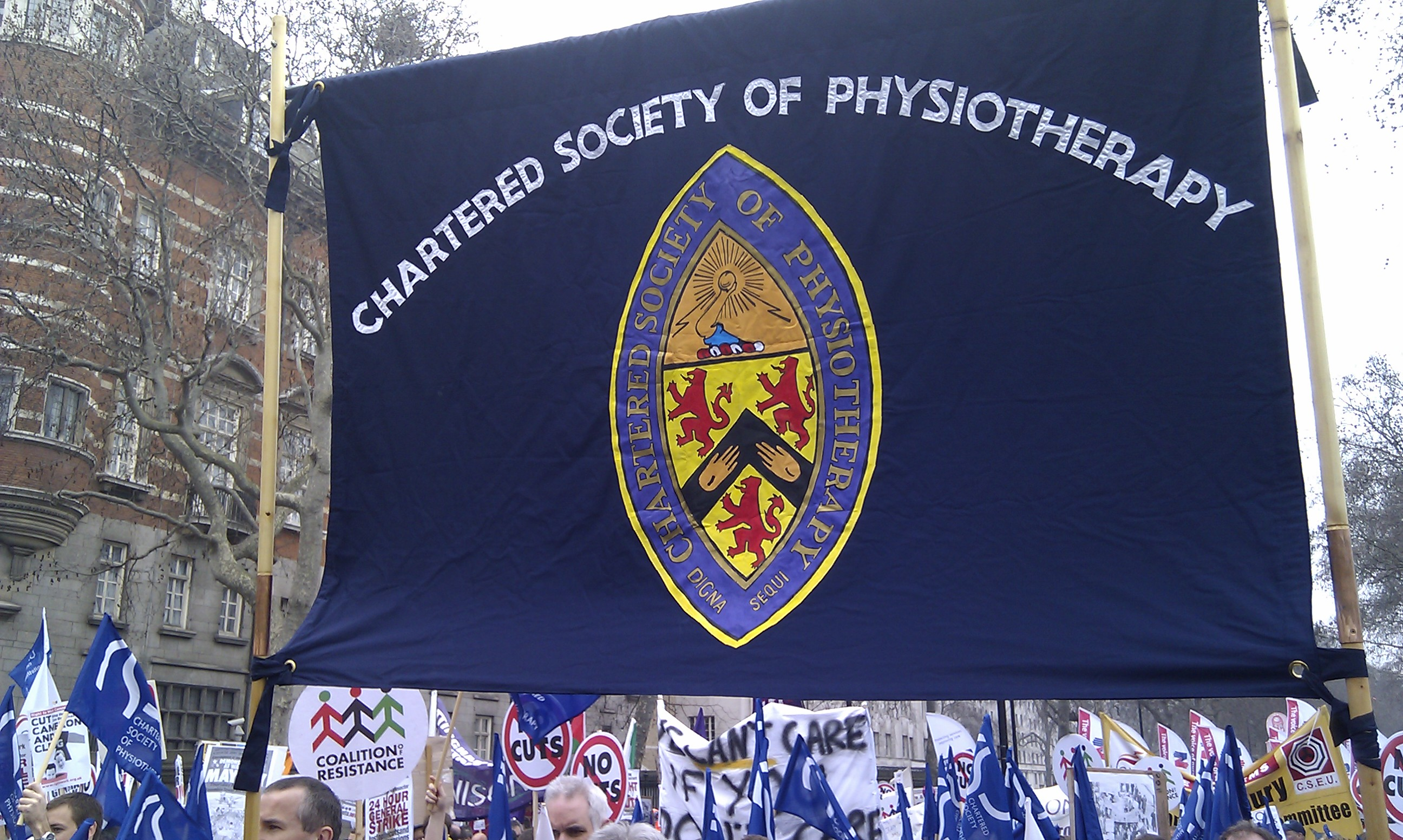
Chartered Society of Physiotherapy banner 2011

== Membership ==
The CSP's membership is made up of a range of physiotherapy professionals: qualified and retired physiotherapists, students of physiotherapy and associate members (support workers and other professionals whose work involves some delegated physiotherapy duties).

CSP members work in a variety of settings across the NHS, in the community, in private practice and in sports.

Members are entitled to use postnominals 'MCSP'; fellows 'FCSP'.

== Aims of the society ==
The Chartered Society of Physiotherapy's stated aims are to:

- lead and support all members in developing and promoting high quality innovative patient care
- protect and further advance the interests and working lives of its members
- raise the profile of the profession and awareness of the benefits physiotherapy offers in preventing ill health, increasing independence for people with long term conditions, and rehabilitation after illness and accident.

== Foundation ==
The Society was established in 1894 as the Society of Trained Masseuses by four nurses - Lucy Marianne Robinson, Dame Rosalind Paget, Elizabeth Anne Manley and Margaret Dora Palmer - who wished to protect their profession after stories in the press warned young nurses and the public of unscrupulous people offering massage as a euphemism for other services. Paget and her nursing and midwifery colleague Rosabella Paulina Fynes Clinton, were two founding members of the Incorporated Society of Trained Masseuses'. Miss Clinton was an examiner for many years and a member of the council from 1889 until her death in 1918.

In 1894 the British Medical Association (BMA) inquired into the education and practice of massage practitioners in London, and found that prostitution was commonly associated with unskilled workers and debt, often working with forged qualifications. In response to what became known as "the Massage Scandals of 1894", legitimate massage workers formed the Society of Trained Masseuses (now known as the Chartered Society of Physiotherapy), with an emphasis on high academic standards and a medical model for massage training.

In 1900 the society acquired the legal and public status of a professional organisation and became the Incorporated Society of Trained Masseuses.

Under the new name of the Chartered Society of Massage and Remedial Gymnasts the society was granted a royal charter by King George V on 11 June 1920. In the same year the society amalgamated with the Institute of Massage and Remedial Gymnastics.

The society adopted its present name in 1944.

== Professional body ==
As a professional body the CSP provides a range of professional services, promotes learning and good practice, and supports its members to achieve continuous professional development (CPD).

== Trade Union body ==
As a trade union the CSP is an affiliated member of the Trades Union Congress (TUC). Lesley Mercer, the former director of the CSP Employment Relations and Union Services (ERUS) was President of the TUC for the year from September 2012 until September 2013. The current Director of Employment Relations and Union Services, Claire Sullivan, who took up her post in October 2014, is a member of the TUC General Council.

== Research and education ==
The society supports research into physiotherapy through the CSP Charitable Trust which funds the Physiotherapy Research Foundation. It works to build knowledge in the professions by funding research to inform clinical practice and clinical effectiveness and build research capacity in the profession by providing new researchers with opportunities to gain funding to enhance their research skills and experience. The society is a member of Consortium of Independent Health Information Libraries in London, and its members benefit from this through preferential rates for journal purchases.

== Structure and governance ==
The CSP is organised into nations and regions of the UK, through English Regional Networks and National Boards of Scotland, Wales and Northern Ireland. The CSP has offices in London, Belfast, Edinburgh and Cardiff. The CSP’s elected governing body is the CSP Council which identifies and agrees CSP policy and strategy. It includes representatives from the English Regions Network, National Boards. The work of the Council is directed by the Industrial Relations Committee and the Practice and Development Committee.
