= Karlene Davis =

Dame Karlene Cecile Davis, DBE (born 10 October 1946) is a former General Secretary of the Royal College of Midwives, Director of the WHO Collaborating Centre for Midwifery, Regional Representative for Europe in the International Confederation of Midwives, a Fellow of the Royal Society of Medicine, and a member of the Wellbeing Council at the Royal College of Obstetricians and Gynaecologists.

Born and raised in Jamaica, Davis emigrated to the UK in 1967 to train as a nurse and later as a midwife before going on to teach midwifery. Her goal is to see midwives acknowledged as the "lead professionals in maternity care, working together to enhance the wider public health both nationally and internationally".

Davis was appointed General Secretary of The Royal College of Midwives in 1994 and served until October 2008. In her period of leadership Davis transformed the RCM into the modern professional membership organisation and effective trade union that it is today. She instituted the Annual Midwifery Awards, which recognises midwives for the crucial role they play in the health of women and families.

In 2001 Davis was appointed Dame Commander of the Order of the British Empire for services to the National Health Service and midwifery.

She was awarded an Honorary Doctorate of Science by the University of Greenwich. She has become one of the most senior black women in the health profession and the UK's first black woman trade union leader. Davis received an honorary doctorate from the University of the West Indies In 2013 Davis was appointed as the chair of the advisory board of Bounty, a neo-natal marketing organization based in the UK.
