= Louisa Hubbard =

English feminist social reformer and writer

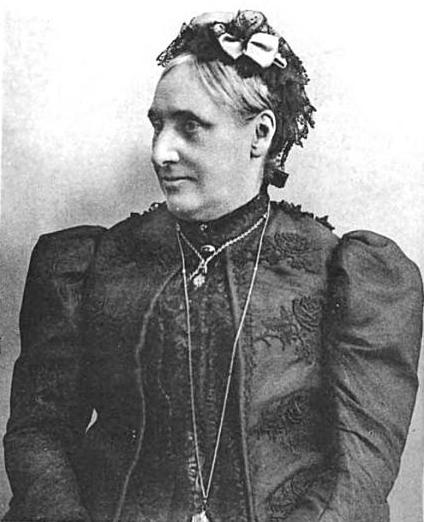
- Louisa Hubbard, c. 1898
- Born: 8 March 1836; Saint Petersburg, Russia
- Died: 5 November 1906 (aged 70); Tyrol, Austria

Louisa Maria Hubbard (8 March 1836 – 5 November 1906) was an English feminist social reformer and writer. She is best known for her activism for increased opportunities for women's education and employment.

Born into a wealthy merchant family in Russia, she moved to England as a young girl and remained there for most of her life. She devoted her time to social activism and used her wealth to fund numerous women's causes. She began her activism in the Anglican deaconess movement in the 1860s, organizing members and raising awareness of its goals.

Hubbard then began promoting elementary education as a career for women. She capitalized on increased awareness of the demand for teachers, following the passage of the Elementary Education Act 1870 (33 & 34 Vict. c. 75). She helped to establish a college to train women as elementary teachers. She was concerned that many women were unable to find work as teachers due to poor educational practices.

Hubbard spent much of her life promoting employment opportunities -- not only teaching -- for women who had to work to support themselves. She particularly focused on unmarried women and impoverished gentlewomen and the disdain in which society held the idea of their employment.

She published several pamphlets and newspapers that argued in favour of educating and providing employment for women. She published A Handbook for Women's Work, later known as The Englishwoman's Yearbook, from 1875 to 1889. She also published The Woman's Gazette, later known as Work and Leisure, from 1875 until 1893. Hubbard initially contributed most of the articles to the publications and later served as editor. Though they became well known, they were mostly unprofitable and Hubbard was forced to subsidise them with her personal wealth. Hubbard also established the Women's Emigration Society to help single women find work overseas after she learned of the job opportunities that were available in the British Colonies. She also helped organise other groups that promoted emigration.

== Early life ==
Hubbard was born in Saint Petersburg to William Egerton Hubbard and Louisa Ellen Hubbard (née Baldock). Her father was a merchant whose family had established business interests in Arkhangelsk Saint Petersburg in the mid 18th century. Her mother was the daughter of a captain. Louisa was the eldest of seven children in the family. In 1843, the Hubbards left Russia for England. They settled on a 2,000-acre (8.1 km^{2}) estate in Leonardslee, where Hubbard was privately educated. She never had to work to support herself due to her family's wealth.

== Deaconess movement ==
In 1864, Hubbard became an Anglican deaconess and became active in the deaconess movement after a friend introduced her to the society. The movement, which had been present in the Anglican church since 1850, focused on providing community life for women and training them work with the poor as nurses or teachers. She began serving with the society and organized a number of gatherings. In 1871, she published a pamphlet entitled Anglican Deaconesses; or Is There No Place for Women in the Parochial System? This work contained descriptions of meetings that she had with church leaders, including Harold Browne. She also met with potential donors to tell them about the movement. She also published a letter in John Bull detailing the aims of the movement. However, she later became discouraged by the slow pace of growth that came to characterise the movement. She ceased active involvement with the group in 1874.

== Education ==
Hubbard first became interested in the idea of training teachers after the editor of John Bull, who had been impressed by her writings about the deaconess movement, asked her to contribute a letter on the subject. She responded by writing several letters advocating the creation of schools to train women as teachers. These were later re-published as a pamphlet. The Elementary Education Act 1870 (33 & 34 Vict. c. 75) created a great demand for school teachers. Hubbard sought to train women to fill these roles, and worked to establish Otter College in Chichester in 1873 to train women as elementary school teachers. The idea of opening this school was first suggested to her by Sir James Kay-Shuttleworth. Hubbard promoted the idea in several venues and attempted to win public support for the venue. Otter College had been established in 1849 as a school for male teachers, but the school had ceased operations several years previous. Hubbard felt that many girls were unaccustomed to the academic discipline that was required to become a teacher. She continued writing about the importance of educating women and published two works in 1878 and 1880 to convince parents to educate their daughters. She also tried to establish a school for girls age 15 to 18, but was unable to do so due to a lack of funding.

At this time, working as a schoolteacher was viewed as a position not suited for many women. Women who were middle-class or above were limited to roles as governesses by social convention. This created a dramatic shortage of qualified elementary teachers. She was initially worried about the difficulties that middle-class women would face working in schools with members of lower social classes, but ultimately decided that such sacrifices would be justified because education was a noble cause. Otter College assured middle-class parents that their daughters would be educated around women of similar backgrounds.

== Employment ==
After helping establish Otter College, Hubbard began broadening her focus from helping women become teachers to helping them find work in general. She became convinced that there were many women who would not be able to find work as teachers, due to the limited number of teaching positions and the limited skills of many unemployed women. Hubbard fought against the stigma that accompanied women's employment in part through religious justifications. She argued that women were designed by God to be self-sacrificing and devoted to the welfare of others. Employment was described as a way for single women to fulfill this calling. Martha Vicinus has argued that Hubbard's tone at times casts work as a sort of penance.

Though Hubbard promoted women's employment and never married, she often fought against the perception that employment would make women less likely to marry. She fought against the idea that women who did not marry should be seen as failures by society. She sought to convince single women to counter this idea with self-reliance and self-respect.

In the first issue of The Women's Gazette Hubbard published a letter from Elizabeth Missing Sewell that advocated the creation of a club for impoverished gentlewomen. This resulted in the creation of an organization known as the Working Ladies' Guild by Lady Mary Feilding. Hubbard frequently corresponded with the leadership of the guild often attended their committee meetings.

Correspondence published in The Women's Gazette also led to the founding of the Teachers' Guild in 1884. She also supported the Gentlewomen's Employment Club in London, donating a significant sum of money in 1889. In The Women's Gazette and Work and Leisure Hubbard also promoted the idea of Friendly societies for women. In 1889 Hubbard served as the provisional president of a new group known as the Court of the United Sisters' Friendly Society. Several other organizations were formed by readers of Hubbard's publications. She often sought to unify and coordinate philanthropic activities by different women's groups. Many of the idea that she advanced were dramatically opposed to the prevailing views in society at the time she began her activism, but became commonplace by the end of her life. She also promoted midwifery as a career and argued that better training was needed for women in the field. She also helped establish the Trained Midwives Registration Society with Zepherina Veitch, initially serving as the organising secretary.

Hubbard sought to provide suitable housing opportunities for urban single women, who were often unable to afford to rent housing in London. During meetings held at the offices of The Woman's Gazette, the idea of promoting inexpensive housing for women was frequently discussed. Though there were boarding houses available, they were often deemed unsuitable for gentlewomen. Hubbard then published several articles discussing this issue in her paper. These publications led to the establishment of the "Ladies Dwelling Co." in 1887, which built a house that eventually held 150 women. British General William Feilding served as the Chairman of the company until 1895. Hubbard left the organisation in 1889 due to disagreements with the company committee about how to deal with the company's financial problems. Hubbard also helped organise a group that sought to protect female travelers from scams in 1885.

Hubbard also gathered statistics about the number of women engaged in philanthropic work. In 1893, she performed a survey of the women's philanthropic movement along with Angela Burdett-Coutts. Their survey found that there were at least 500,000 women engaged in philanthropy "semi-professionally" and 20,000 paid by women's charities. These figures did not include nurses or missionaries. Hubbard later stated that exact numbers were difficult to determine and that their figures were basic estimations.

== Women's Emigration Society ==
After a writer told Hubbard in 1877 that far more men than women had emigrated from England and that there were many opportunities for women in the British colonies, she became interested in promoting emigration. She then began advocating emigration as an option for indigent women and published information about emigration to Australia in The Women's Gazette. Hubbard proceeded to publish several articles about emigration in The Woman's Gazette and Work and Leisure, which drew the attention of several other emigration activists. The largest established emigration society for women in London at that time often tried to discourage applicants from emigration. In 1880, Hubbard established the Women's Emigration Society in order to promote and facilitate emigration. The group initially focused on emigration to Canada, but later expanded to New Zealand, South Africa, and the United States. Most women sought to become governesses or helpers for families. Emigration was also promoted as a way for single women to find husbands. The society often worked with branches of the YWCA and local bishops in the locations that they sought to place women. The leadership of the society later encountered organisational difficulties and folded in 1884.

Hubbard later sought to unify societies that were working interdependently to promote emigration. She published a book titled The United Englishwomen's Emigration Register and founded the United Englishwomen's Emigration Association to try to unify the women's emigration movement. The United Englishwomen's Emigration Association soon floundered, as well.

== Writing ==
In addition to advocating increased training for women, Hubbard also worked to raise awareness of existing employment opportunities. From 1869 to 1878, she published a guide to charitable institutions that were targeted towards women titled A Guide to all Institutions for the Benefit of Women. In 1875, she began writing A Handbook for Women's Work, which was later known as The Englishwoman's Yearbook. She edited the yearbook until 1898. This publication detailed the qualification, required training, and potential salaries for several careers. These guides tracked the dramatic increase in such institutions during its period of publication. She updated the guide by periodically issuing new editions. Though she listed 82 such groups in 1869, by 1898 her guide was over 200 pages. In 1871, she wrote a series of letters for women seeking employment titled Work for Ladies in Elementary Schools.

Hubbard published The Woman's Gazette which she began work on in 1875 and continued editing until 1893. She decided to publish it monthly so she could update it more frequently than her other guides. Using the pseudonym "L.M.H.", She initially wrote most of the articles in the paper. She often found her work exhausting, periodically suffered from poor health that forced her to turn some of the operations over to friends. In 1884 she left England for an extended vacation in order to rehabilitate after a period of poor health. She also hired a personal assistant to help respond to letters that she received. She employed Emily James as her personal secretary until 1890. In 1890 James began organising conferences about women's employment full-time in an organisation known as the Central Conference Committee. Hubbard served as the chairwoman of the group. She devoted all of the profits from her papers to funding women's causes. The Woman's Gazette cost two pence, making it too expensive for all but middle and upper class women. After the paper failed to turn a profit for several consecutive years, Hubbard renamed it Work and Leisure and began including articles on broader topics. However, the paper never became profitable and Hubbard spent a significant amount of money funding its operations. Hubbard saw herself as an activist rather than a businesswoman, and admitted a lack of business skill. In her papers, Hubbard avoided directly addressing political subjects, although she suggested that women should attempt to promote sensible political positions. Work and Leisure also published financial advice for women, information about inexpensive holiday destinations, warnings about scams, and articles contributed by lawyers about common legal issues women faced.

Using Florence Nightingale as an example, she argued in The Woman's Gazette that nursing, both in hospitals and in private homes, was a career path that women should pursue. Other careers that she promoted included typesetting, massage, and gardening. She was one of the earliest writers in England to suggest these as suitable careers for women. These publications have since been credited with helping to change the perception and awareness of women's employment opportunities.

Hubbard also published books on other subjects, including The Beautiful House and Enchanted Garden.

== Later life ==
Hubbard often rode horses and painted landscapes in her spare time. She lived on her family's estate until 1883 when her brother, a cotton executive, built her a new home in Leonardslee. In 1893 she ceased most of her activity because of failing health. Though Work and Leisure folded, The Englishwoman's Yearbook continued under another editor. She suffered a stroke while in Tyrol in 1899. She stayed there for the last seven years before her death in 1906. At the time of her death, she had a net worth of £2675.
