= Zepherina Smith =

English nurse and social reformer

Zepherina Philadelphia Smith
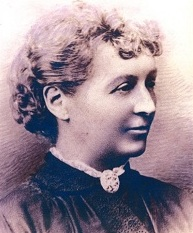
- Born: Zepherina Philadelphia Veitch; 1 April 1836; Sopley, England
- Died: 8 February 1894 (aged 57); Horsell, England
- Education: University College, London
- Occupations: Nurse and Midwife
- Known for: Establishing the Trained Midwives Registration Society
- Spouse: Henry Smith
- Parent(s): Rev. William Douglas Veitch, Elinor Raitt

Zepherina Philadelphia Smith (née Veitch; 1 April 1836 – 8 February 1894) was an English nurse and social reformer who promoted increased education and training for midwives. Her work led to the Royal College of Midwives.

== Early life ==
Smith was born in Sopley and was the daughter of the Reverend William Douglas Veitch and Elinor Raitt. William was the vicar of St Saviour's Church in Paddington. Her parents were very interested in issues affecting the working class, an interest that she later developed.

== Career ==
In 1867 Zepherina was trained as a nurse at the University College, London. Early in her nursing service, she was put in charge of the surgical ward of King's College Hospital and served as the superintendent of nurses at St George's Hospital.

In 1870 she served as a nurse in Sedan during the Franco-Prussian War. She was known for her ability to improvise when lacking the resources of a hospital. That year she also wrote A Handbook for Nursing the Sick, which was well received by her fellow nurses.

In January 1873 Zepherina became qualified as a midwife and was the tenth person to gain a Diploma from the Obstetrical Society of London. She was dismayed by the small amount of training many of her fellow midwives had received. She then worked with publisher Louisa Hubbard to establish the Trained Midwives Registration Society and was the treasurer of the new society.

She served as the president of the Midwives' Institute from 1890 until her death in 1894. In this role she advised government regulators on legislation about midwifery, including addressing a Select Committee at the House of Commons in 1892.

== Personal life ==
In 1876 she married Henry Smith, a widowed surgeon. After they were married she ceased working as a midwife and devoted herself to activism. She sought to increase the amount of training required to be certified as a midwife and also sought to attract middle-class women to the field.

== Death ==
Smith died in 1894 at her home in Horsell after being ill for several months. Her net worth at the time of her death was £473.

== Bibliography ==
- Hannam, June (2004), "Smith [née Veitch], Zepherina Philadelphia (1836–1894)", Oxford Dictionary of National Biography, Oxford University Press
- Pratt, Edwin (1898), A woman's work for women: being the aims, efforts and aspirations of "L.M.H.", G. Newnes, Ltd.
