= Lesley Page =

Midwife and academic

Professor Lesley Page CBE, MSc, BA, RM, RMT
- Born: Lesley Ann Page; 1944 (age 81–82)
- Education: Simpson Memorial Maternity Pavilion
- Occupations: Midwife; Academic
- Website: lesleypage.net

Professor Lesley Ann Page CBE, MSc, BA, RM, RMT (born 1944) is a British midwife and academic, and was President of the Royal College of Midwives.

Page qualified in midwifery at the Simpson Memorial Maternity Pavilion, Edinburgh, in 1966.

From 1994 to 2000 she was the Queen Charlotte's Professor of Midwifery Practice, joint at Thames Valley University and Queen Charlotte's and Hammersmith Hospitals.

From 1994 to 1998 held the post of visiting professor at the Institute of Obstetrics and Gynaecology, the Royal Postgraduate Medical School, University of London. She has also been a visiting professor at the University of Sydney and University of Technology Sydney, and a clinical professor at the University of British Columbia.

She was elected President of the Royal College of Midwives in 2012.

She was made a Commander of the Order of the British Empire (CBE) in the 2014 Birthday Honours, "For services to Midwifery".
