= Midland Metropolitan University Hospital =

Hospital near Birmingham, England

- Sandwell and West Birmingham Hospitals NHS Trust
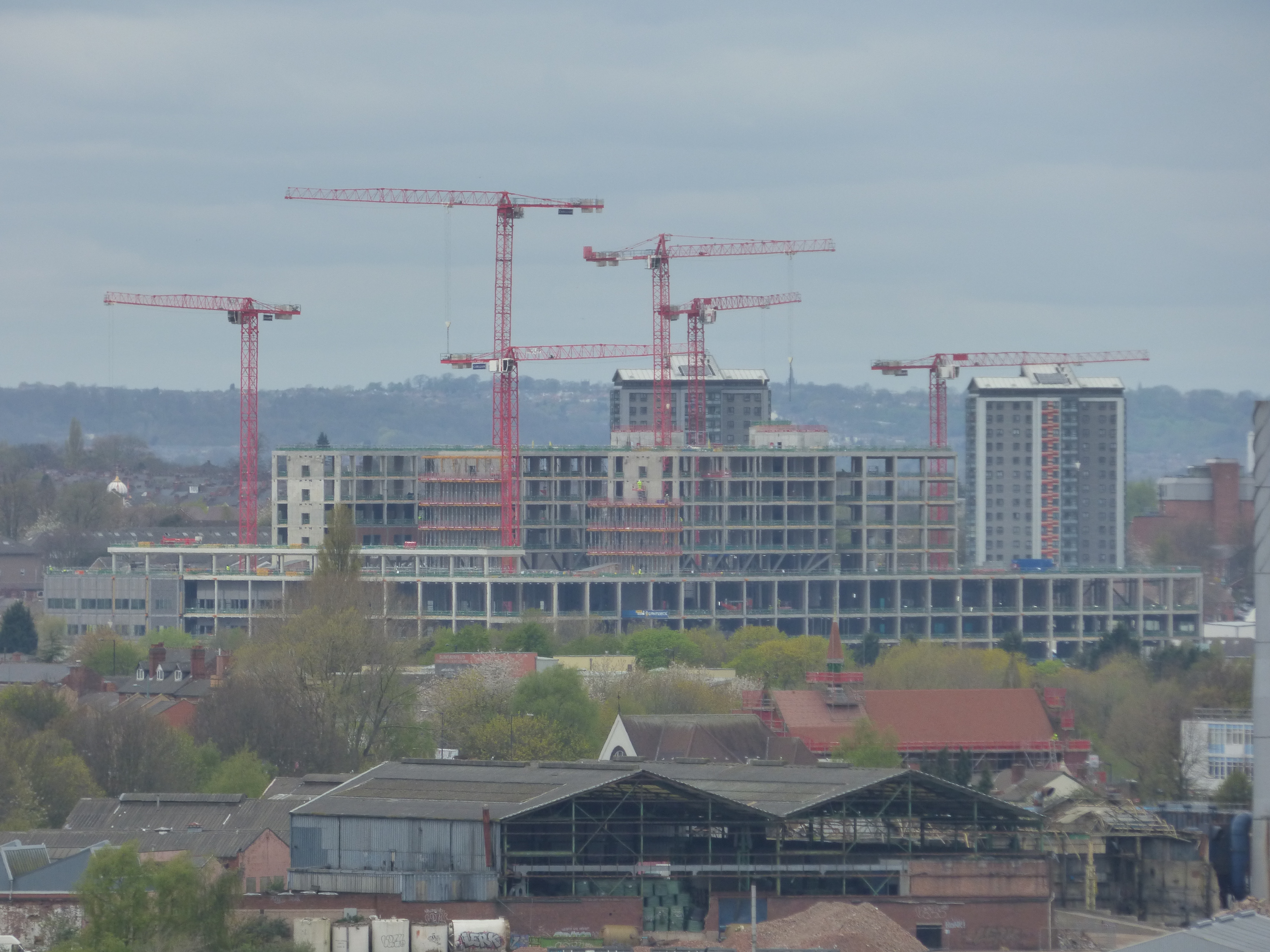
- Midland Metropolitan Hospital under construction in April 2017

- Location within West Midlands

Geography
- Location: Smethwick, West Midlands, England, United Kingdom
- Coordinates: 52.49093°N 1.94924°W

Organisation
- Care system: Public NHS
- Type: District General
- Affiliated university: University of Birmingham; Aston University; Birmingham City University

Services
- Emergency department: Yes Accident & Emergency
- Beds: 736

History
- Constructed: January 2016
- Opened: 6 October 2024

Links
- Website: www.swbh.nhs.uk/midland-metropolitan-university-hospital/
- Lists: Hospitals in England

Midland Metropolitan University Hospital is an acute general hospital on Grove Lane in Smethwick, near Birmingham. The hospital was designed by HKS, Cagni Williams and Sonnemann Toon Architects. Its emergency department replaced those at Sandwell and City hospitals.

Already behind its original target completion date of October 2018, it was being built by Carillion. However, the company went into liquidation in January 2018, causing the PFI contract to be terminated. This, plus later materials and manpower shortages, delayed the hospital's completion further. The hospital opened to the public on 6 October 2024.

== History ==
=== Project inception ===
The Sandwell and West Birmingham Hospitals NHS Trust was granted a compulsory purchase order to buy the land at Grove Lane, which had previously been used for industrial purposes by GKN, in January 2011. At that time, the hospital was planned to be open by 2016. The hospital was designed by HKS, Cagni Williams and Sonnemann Toon Architects.

The new hospital was initially planned to have 670 beds and 15 operating theatre suites, although this had increased to 700 beds by the time it opened. The total capital cost was forecast to be £297 million of which £100 million would be provided by HM Treasury with the remainder privately financed. Work on site started in January 2016 and construction was due to be completed in October 2018, but the project became delayed, with completion initially rescheduled for 2019.

=== Carillion liquidation, resulting and other delays ===
Until January 2018, it was being built by Carillion who were also to provide hard facilities management and life-cycle maintenance services. On 15 January 2018, Carillion went into liquidation, partly due to its problems with the hospital contract, and delaying the project still further; 70 Carillion staff lost their jobs. On 26 March 2018, it was reported that the project had been costing over £17m more than Carillion had officially reported.

In March 2018, Skanska negotiated to take over the hospital's construction, with the project 18 months late and likely to cost an additional £125 million. In May 2018, Sandwell and West Birmingham NHS Trust had yet to confirm Skanska to complete the project, and with the unfinished site deteriorating, completion was likely to be pushed back an additional two years, to 2022. In June 2018, a consortium of banks financing the project withdrew their support, and HM Treasury cancelled the PFI contract for construction of the hospital, leaving it with a lengthy search for new investment and pushing the completion date back to at least 2022.

In the meantime, the NHS trust started tendering for an interim contractor to deliver a £13m programme of works to protect the site until a replacement construction contractor is appointed; the OJEU notice for the £13m early works contract was published on 9 August 2018; in October 2018, this work was awarded to Balfour Beatty.

In August 2018, market testing with contractors showed there was little appetite to bid under a private finance model, and that a PF2 bid would be over £100m more expensive and take six months longer. As a result, the NHS trust sought direct government funding to complete the project, and on 16 August 2018, the government announced it would provide funding to complete the hospital. In November 2018, it was reported that the NHS Trust was struggling to find a contractor to complete the hospital, with the possibility that the hospital might be delayed beyond 2022. In January 2019, firms - some previously involved with the project - were formally invited to apply for shortlisting to complete the half-finished hospital; the successful bidder was expected to start in October 2019 and complete the project in late 2021. A wrangle over proposed changes to local authority boundaries threatened to delay the contractor appointment, with Balfour Beatty reportedly the sole bidder for the project. In September 2019, it was reported that Balfour Beatty was still awaiting approval to start work, possibly in December 2019, with completion scheduled for the summer of 2022. The £267m contract was finally signed, and work was expected to start, in December 2019.

A delayed National Audit Office report into the government's handling of the Midland Metropolitan and the Royal Liverpool University Hospital was published in January 2020. The report warned of possible further significant cost increases, and blamed Carillion for pricing the jobs too low to meet specifications. The two projects were expected to cost more than 40% more than their original budgets, and to be completed between three and five years late. However, due to effective risk transfer to the contractor, the total cost to the taxpayer would be very similar to the original plan.

In October 2021, the NHS Trust was told that the 2022 opening date was likely to be missed as a result of materials shortages and workforce availability delaying completion. In July 2022, the Trust said the hospital would open in spring 2024. In October 2023, this date was pushed back to autumn 2024; in August 2024, the planned opening date was confirmed as 6 October 2024.

=== Opening ===
Despite initially planning on breaking the UK record for fastest construction of a hospital, the Midland Metropolitan University Hospital was six years late upon opening on 6 October 2024.

The Accident & Emergency department at Midland Metropolitan University Hospital replaced the A&E at Sandwell General Hospital, which closed on 6 October, and the A&E at City Hospital, Birmingham, which was scheduled to close on 10 November 2024.
