= Sandwell General Hospital =

Hospital near Birmingham, England

Sandwell Health Campus (formerly Sandwell General Hospital)
- Sandwell and West Birmingham Hospitals NHS Trust
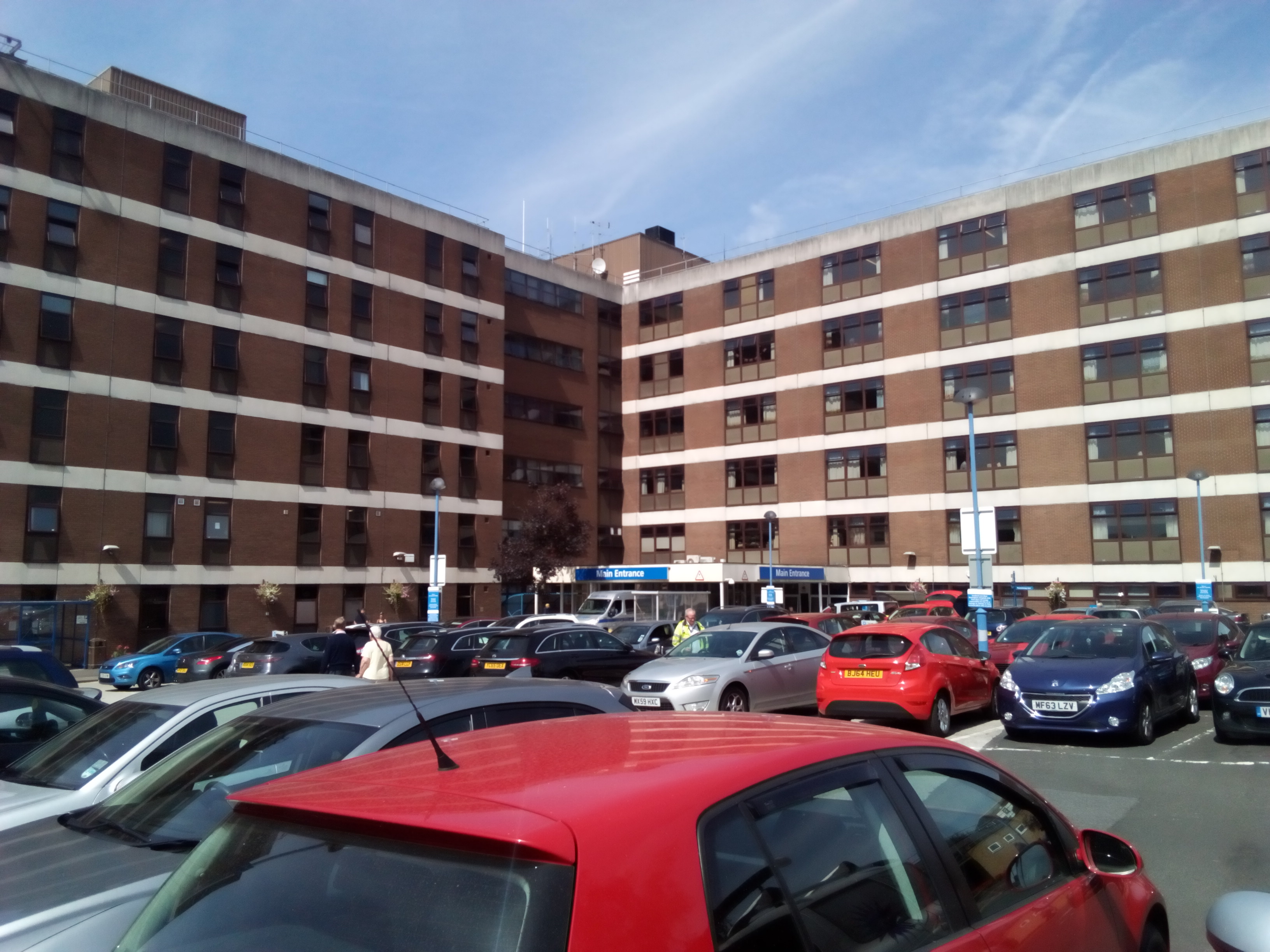
- Sandwell General Hospital's main block, August 2016

- Shown in West Midlands

Geography
- Location: Sandwell, West Midlands, England
- Coordinates: 52.5277°N 1.9889°W

Organisation
- Care system: NHS
- Type: District General
- Affiliated university: University of Birmingham; Aston University; Birmingham City University

Services
- Emergency department: No

History
- Founded: 1884
- Closed: October 2024

Links
- Website: www.swbh.nhs.uk
- Lists: Hospitals in England

Sandwell Health Campus, formerly Sandwell General Hospital, is an outpatients hospital of the Sandwell and West Birmingham Hospitals NHS Trust in West Bromwich, England and provides an extensive range of general and specialist hospital services.

It was closed as a general acute hospital, along with the trust's City Hospital, upon the opening of Midland Metropolitan University Hospital in October 2024. It was subsequently renamed Sandwell Health Campus and now provides some inpatient services.

== History ==
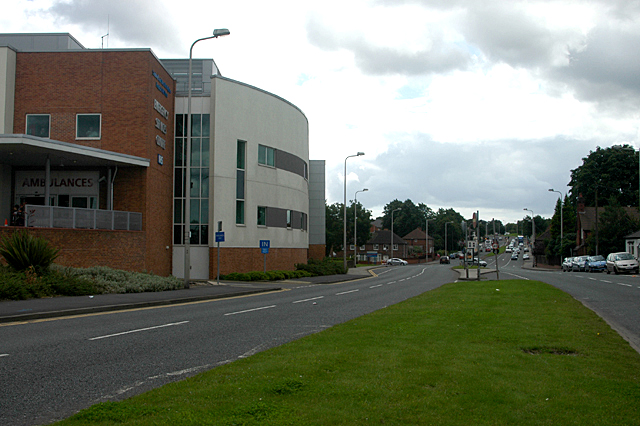
The hospital's All Saints Way frontage, seen in 2009

The hospital started as an infirmary which was added to the West Bromwich union workhouse in 1884. Improvements were begun in 1925, when the infirmary then became a separate institution named Hallam Hospital. After the creation of the NHS and rebuilding in the 1970s, the hospital was renamed Sandwell General Hospital.

A new £18m Emergency Services Centre opened on the Sandwell General Hospital campus in April 2005. This facility replaced the old A&E department destroyed by the largest fire in National Health Service history. It incorporated a comprehensive A&E facility, Emergency Assessment Unit and Cardiac Care Unit. The model of care was developed with primary care to provide a fully integrated service.

Emergency coronary care was transferred from the hospital to City Hospital, Birmingham in 2015.

The accident and emergency department (A&E) at Sandwell Hospital closed on 6 October 2024, after being replaced by the A&E at the new Midland Metropolitan University Hospital in Smethwick. The Sandwell A&E is to be converted into an urgent treatment centre.

== Facilities ==
Sandwell Health Campus provides outpatient services including ophthalmology, ear, nose and throat (ENT), gynaecology, paediatrics, dental, orthotics, midwifery-led antenatal care, dermatology, therapy services, cardiac rehabilitation and medical specialties.

== See also ==
- List of hospitals in England
