= Menial job =

Low-paid unskilled job

A menial job is a job that requires low skills, is low paid, involves repeating the same tasks, and is perceived in society as being of low value. It can be used as a means of discrimination. Menial jobs are essential for many economic sectors (hospitality industry, retail, agriculture, manufacturing sector). One of the advantages is that it can be found relatively easily and that it offers a secure income in periods of economic crisis and high unemployment. Examples of such jobs are: cashiers, employees in fast food restaurants, janitors, construction workers.

== See also ==
- Dead-end job
- Unskilled labor
- Bullshit job
- Indentured servitude
