= Sandwell and West Birmingham Hospitals NHS Trust =

NHS hospital trust

Sandwell and West Birmingham NHS Trust
- Type: NHS hospital trust
- Established: 1 April 2002
- Budget: £436 million
- Hospitals: Sandwell General Hospital; City Hospital, Birmingham; Rowley Regis Hospital; Midland Metropolitan University Hospital
- Chair: David Nicholson
- Chief executive: Richard Beeken
- Website: www.swbh.nhs.uk

Sandwell and West Birmingham NHS Trust is one of the largest National Health Service teaching Trusts in England and comprises Sandwell General Hospital in West Bromwich, City Hospital, Birmingham, Rowley Regis Hospital and Midland Metropolitan University Hospital. The trust was established on 1 April 2002 following approval given by the Secretary of State for Health to amalgamate Sandwell Healthcare NHS Trust and City Hospital NHS Trust.

== Development ==
In January 2014 it was reported that the trust had invested £3 million in creating a new blood sciences laboratory at Sandwell Hospital which processes more than 7,000 samples and produces around 30,000 test results a day. It was designed to fit with the needs of the proposed new Midland Metropolitan University Hospital in Smethwick.

The trust agreed in July 2015 to join the Black Country Alliance with Dudley Group NHS Foundation Trust and Walsall Healthcare NHS Trust. The plan was to create a jointly owned Company Limited by Guarantee which would enable the three trusts to jointly bid for contracts. There would also be some consolidation of administrative functions like payroll, information technology and estates.

The trust planned to cut around 1,400 posts between 2015 and 2020 in order to reduce pay costs by £16.1m, though it was recruiting more staff including A&E consultants and nurses.

=== Midland Metropolitan University Hospital ===
In July 2014 it was announced that £353 million would be invested in a new 670-bed acute Midland Metropolitan University Hospital covering 16 acres in Grove Lane, Smethwick. £100 million would be provided by HM Treasury, the remainder privately. Rowley Regis Hospital in the Tory marginal seat of Halesowen and Rowley Regis would have an expanded role in non-acute, community-based care. Carillion's joint venture, the Hospital Company, was to build it at a capital cost of £297m and provide hard facilities management and life-cycle maintenance services. The new hospital will have 15 operating theatre suites.

On 15 January 2018, Carillion went into liquidation, partly due to problems with the hospital contract, and delaying the project still further. On 26 March 2018, it was reported that the project had been costing over £17m more than Carillion had officially reported.

In March 2018, Skanska negotiated to take over the hospital's construction, with the project 18 months late and likely to cost an additional £125 million. In May 2018, the NHS trust had yet to confirm Skanska to complete the project, and with the unfinished site deteriorating, completion was likely to be pushed back an additional two years, to 2022. In June 2018, a consortium of banks financing the project withdrew their support, and HM Treasury cancelled the PFI contract for construction of the hospital, leaving the NHS trust with a lengthy search for new investment and pushing the completion date back to at least 2022.

In the meantime, the NHS trust started tendering for an interim contractor to deliver a £13m early works programme to protect the site until a replacement construction contractor is appointed; in October 2018, this work was awarded to Balfour Beatty.

In August 2018, market testing with contractors showed there was little appetite to bid under a private finance model, and that a PF2 bid would be over £100m more expensive and take six months longer. As a result, the NHS trust sought direct government funding, and on 16 August 2018, the government announced it would fund completion of the hospital. In November 2018, it was reported that the NHS trust was struggling to find a contractor to complete the hospital, with the possibility that the hospital might be delayed beyond 2022.

The hospital eventually opened on 6 October 2024.

=== General practice ===
The trust took over Great Bridge Health Centre and Lyndon Health Centre in 2019 and will take over Summerfield GP and Urgent Care Practice from Virgin Care in June. Together the three practices have about 15,000 registered patients. The trust will be running them in conjunction with Your Health Partnership, a Sandwell-based GP led partnership.

== Performance ==
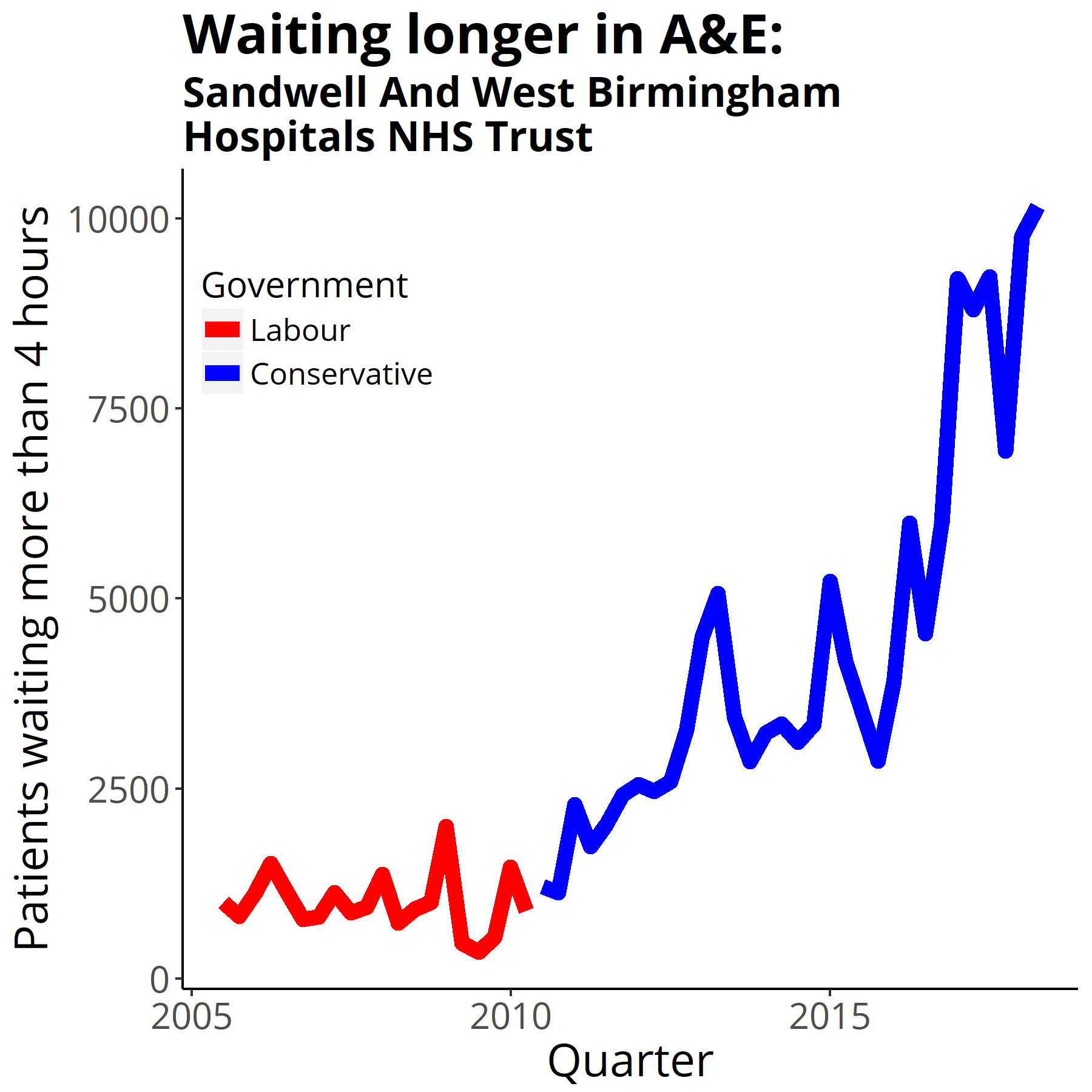
Four-hour target in the emergency department quarterly figures from NHS England Data from https://www.england.nhs.uk/statistics/statistical-work-areas/ae-waiting-times-and-activity/

The trust was among the three worst nationally over care for women giving birth. The trust issued invoices to patients thought to be ineligible for NHS treatment totalling £2.5 million in 2018–9, but only collected £0.3 million.

== Vaping ==
Two hospitals run by the trust opened vape shops in 2019 in conjunction with a ban on smoking. At the time, Public Health England advised hospitals to let patients vape indoors - and even in bed.

== See also ==
- List of NHS trusts
- Healthcare in West Midlands
