= Birmingham Union Workhouse =

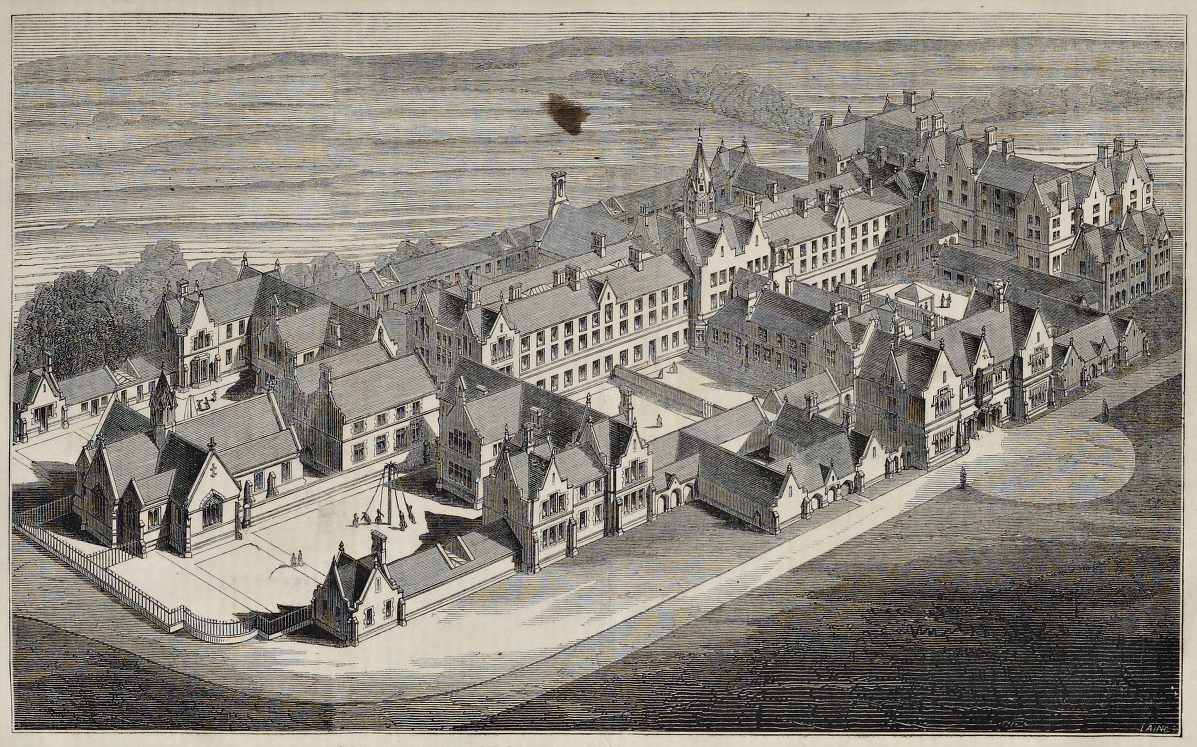
- 1852 architect's visualisation of the, then, new workhouse

General information
- Type: Workhouse
- Location: City Hospital, Birmingham, England
- Coordinates: 52.4886°N 1.9294°W

Design and construction
- Architects: John Jones Bateman and G Drury

The Birmingham Union Workhouse was a workhouse on Western Road in Birmingham, England.

== Earlier workhouse ==
The Birmingham Workhouse Infirmary was a workhouse constructed in 1734 on the site of the present day Coleridge Passage in the city centre, now opposite Birmingham Children's Hospital. This facility had hosted the medical lectures of Mr John Tomlinson, the First Surgeon of the infirmary; these lectures, commencing in 1767 were the precursor to the foundation of the Birmingham Medical School in 1825 and were among the first formal medical lectures held outside London and Scotland.

== Later workhouse ==
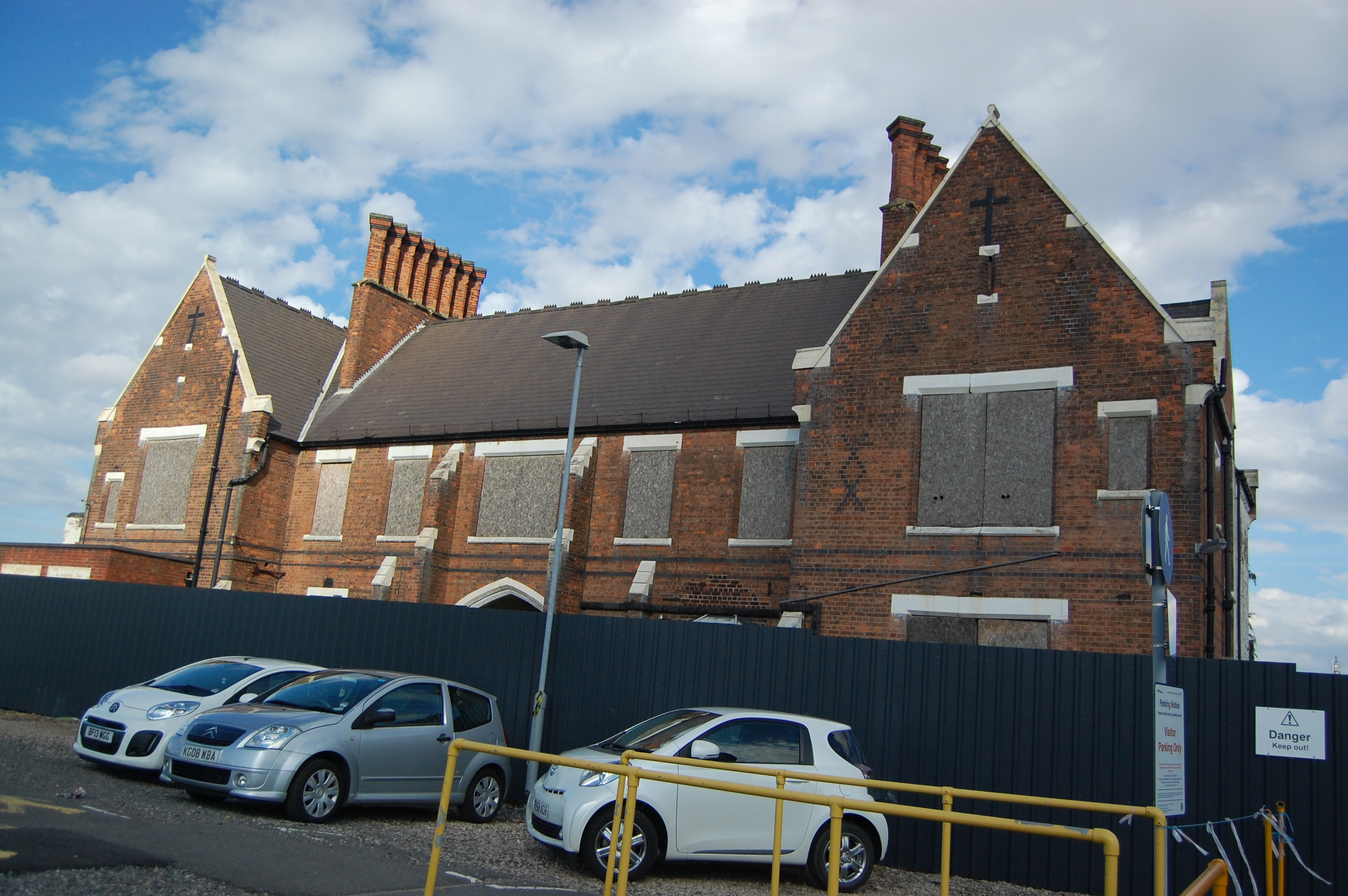
The gatehouse in 2017, just before demolition. The top of the "arch of tears" is just visible

A new infirmary building, built to increase the capacity of the old one, was constructed between 1850 and 1852 under the Poor Law Amendment Act 1834, to designs by John Jones Bateman and G Drury. It was built in the Winson Green area, to the west of the city centre. The main entrance building, though derelict, survived until demolition in September 2017. Its arched entrance was known as "the arch of tears". The remainder of the workhouse was demolished in the early 1990s.

In 1889 a hospital was built as an extension to the workhouse. This still exists, much enlarged and redeveloped, as City Hospital (formerly Dudley Road Hospital).

Despite its age and social significance, calls by the Victorian Society and Birmingham Conservation Trust, for the workhouse entrance building to be listed, were turned down by English Heritage in 2010.
