= Rosalind Paget =

British nurse and reformer (1855–1948)

Dame Rosalind Paget DBE ARRC
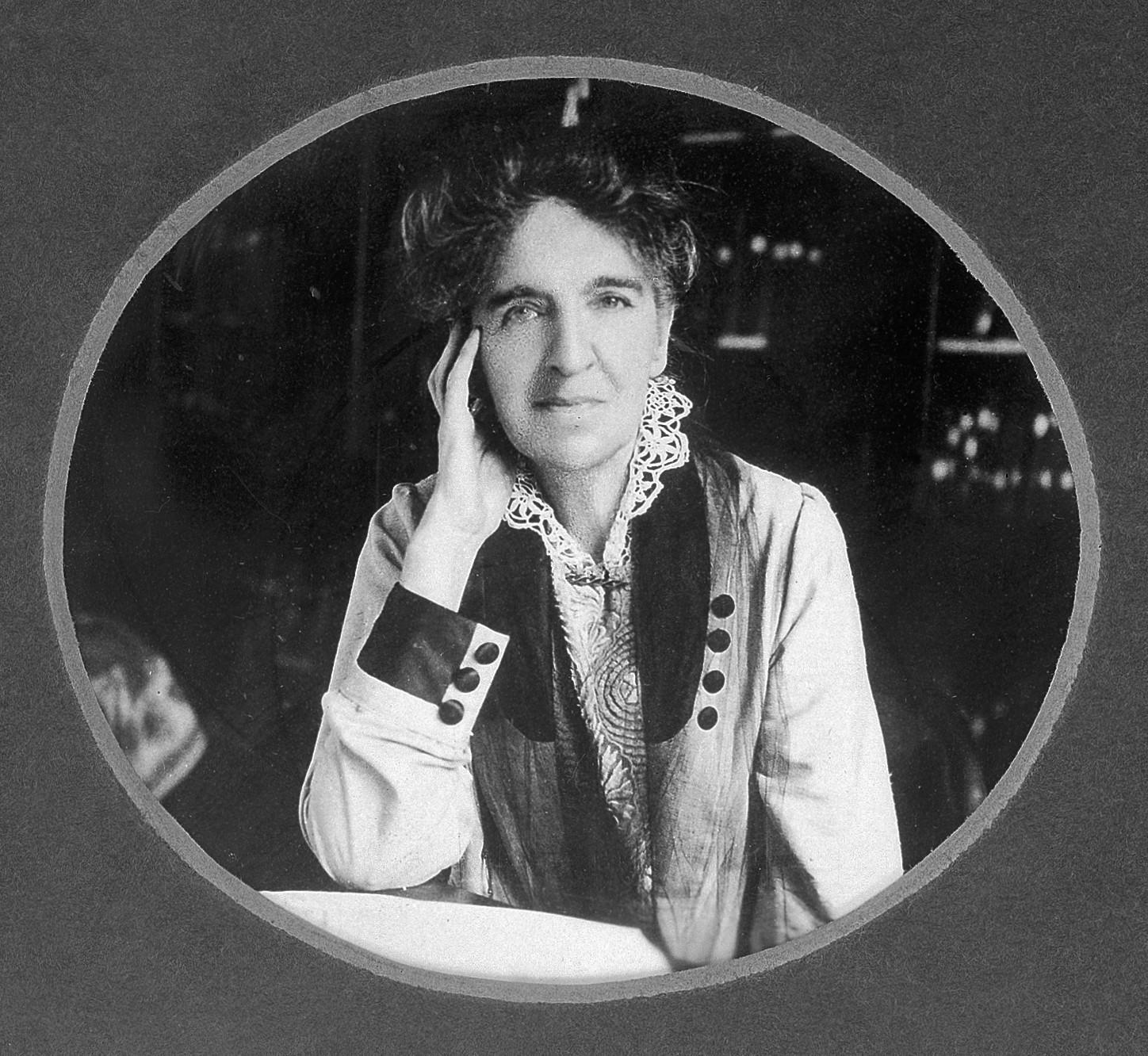
- Born: 4 January 1855; Liverpool, England
- Died: 19 August 1948 (aged 93)
- Known for: Midwife campaigner and reformer
- Parent(s): John Paget; Elizabeth Rathbone
- Awards: Dame Commander of the Order of the British Empire (1935)
- Scientific career
- Fields: Nurse, midwife

Dame Mary Rosalind Paget, DBE, ARRC (4 January 1855 – 19 August 1948), was a noted British nurse, midwife and reformer. She was the first superintendent, later inspector general, of the Queen's Jubilee Institute for District Nursing, which was renamed as the Queen's Institute of District Nursing in 1928 and as the Queen's Nursing Institute in 1973.

== Career ==
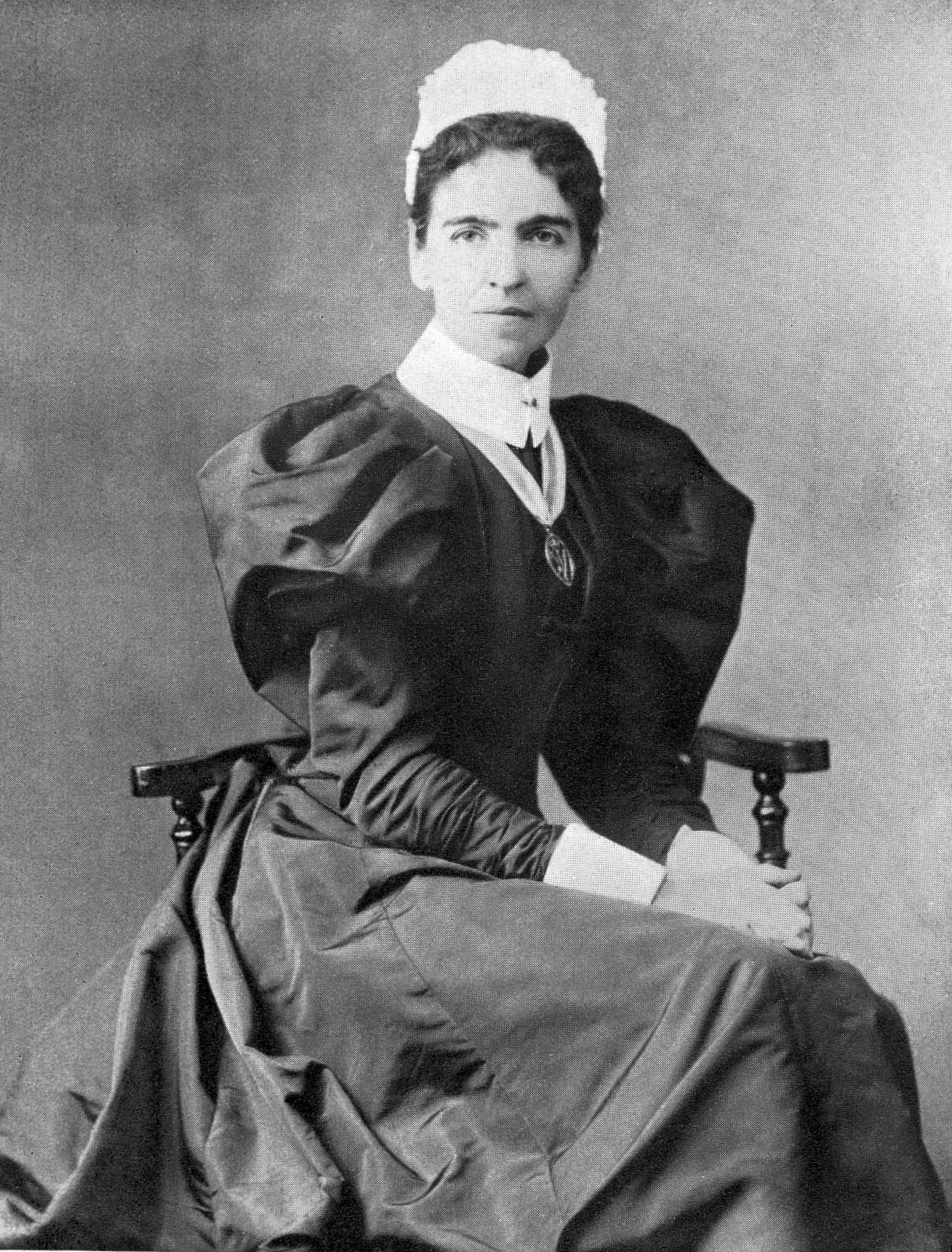
Photo of Dame Rosalind Paget, 1st Queen's Nurse and Inspector

Rosalind Paget gained experience and trained at a number of hospitals and in a number of specialities including general and children's nursing, maternity care and medical massage. She worked at the Westminster Hospital, London in 1875 and for four months in 1876. Paget also gained experience at the Liverpool Royal Infirmary, Liverpool, and the East London Children's Hospital, and Manchester General Children's Hospital, Pendlebury where she worked under Eva Luckes. She trained at The London Hospital under Matron Eva Luckes from 1882 to 1884, and stayed on there as Holiday Sister between 1884 and 1889.

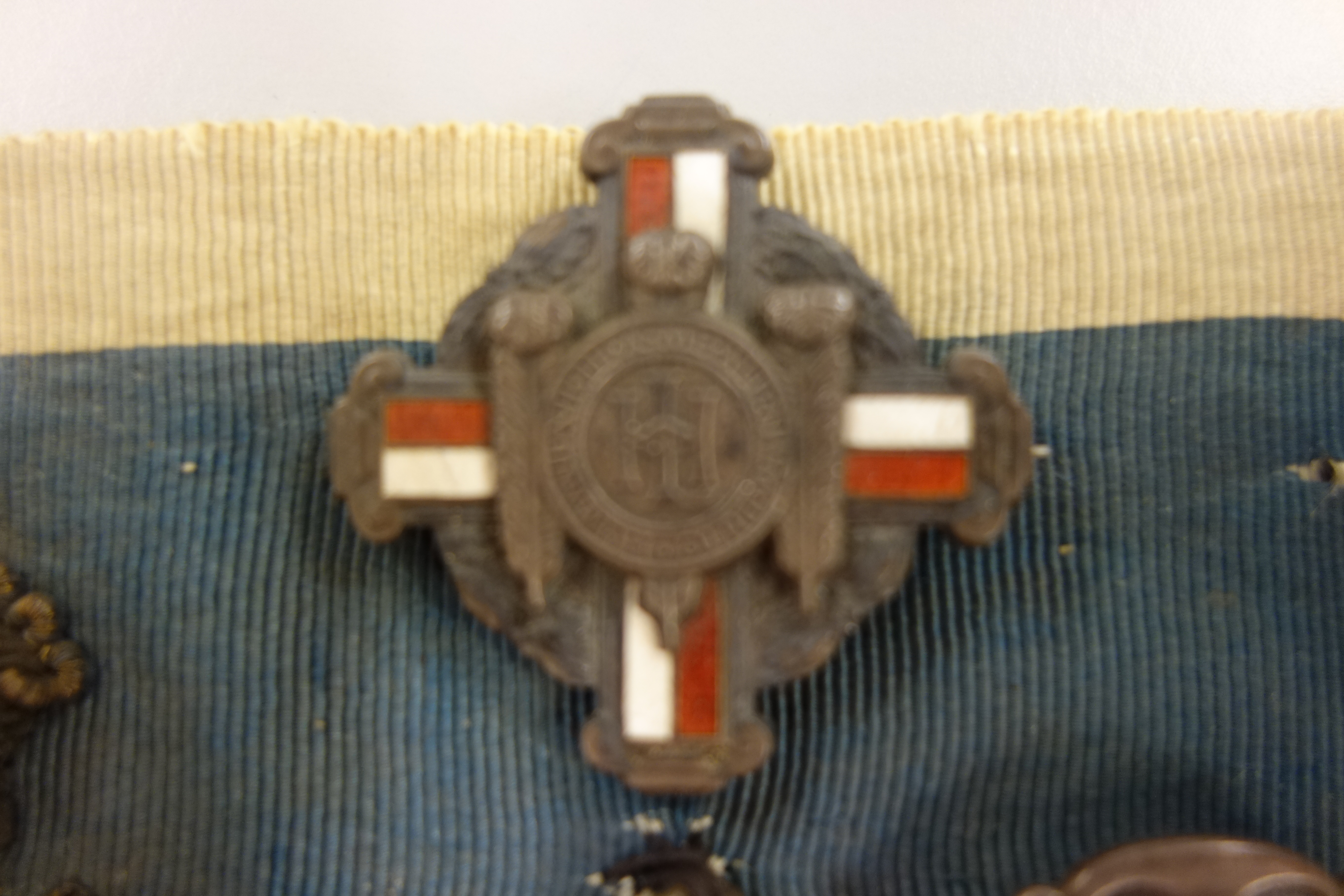
Paget's London Hospital nurses badge

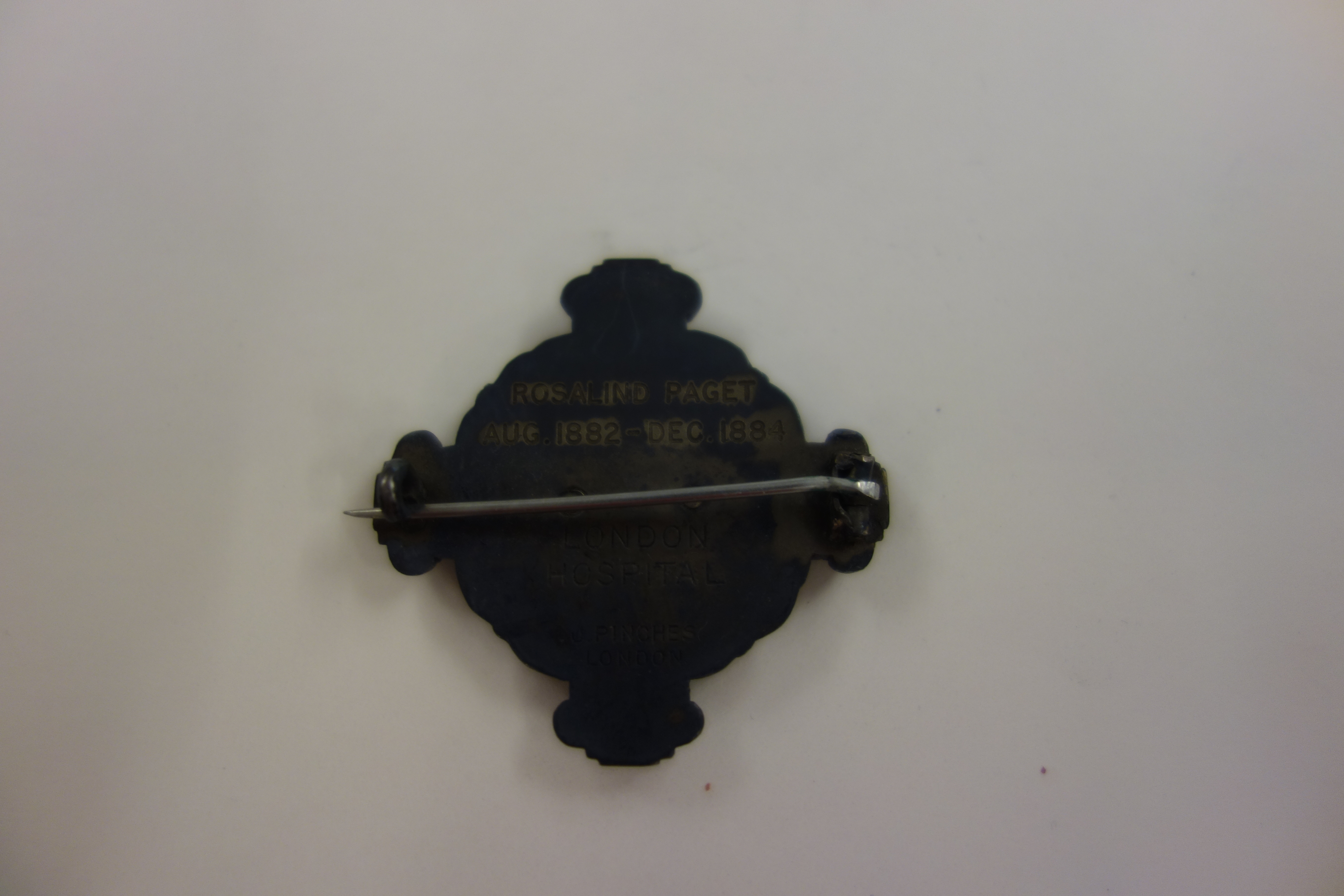
The reverse of Paget's badge dated 1882–1884. It would have been bought after 1931 when the badges were first issued.

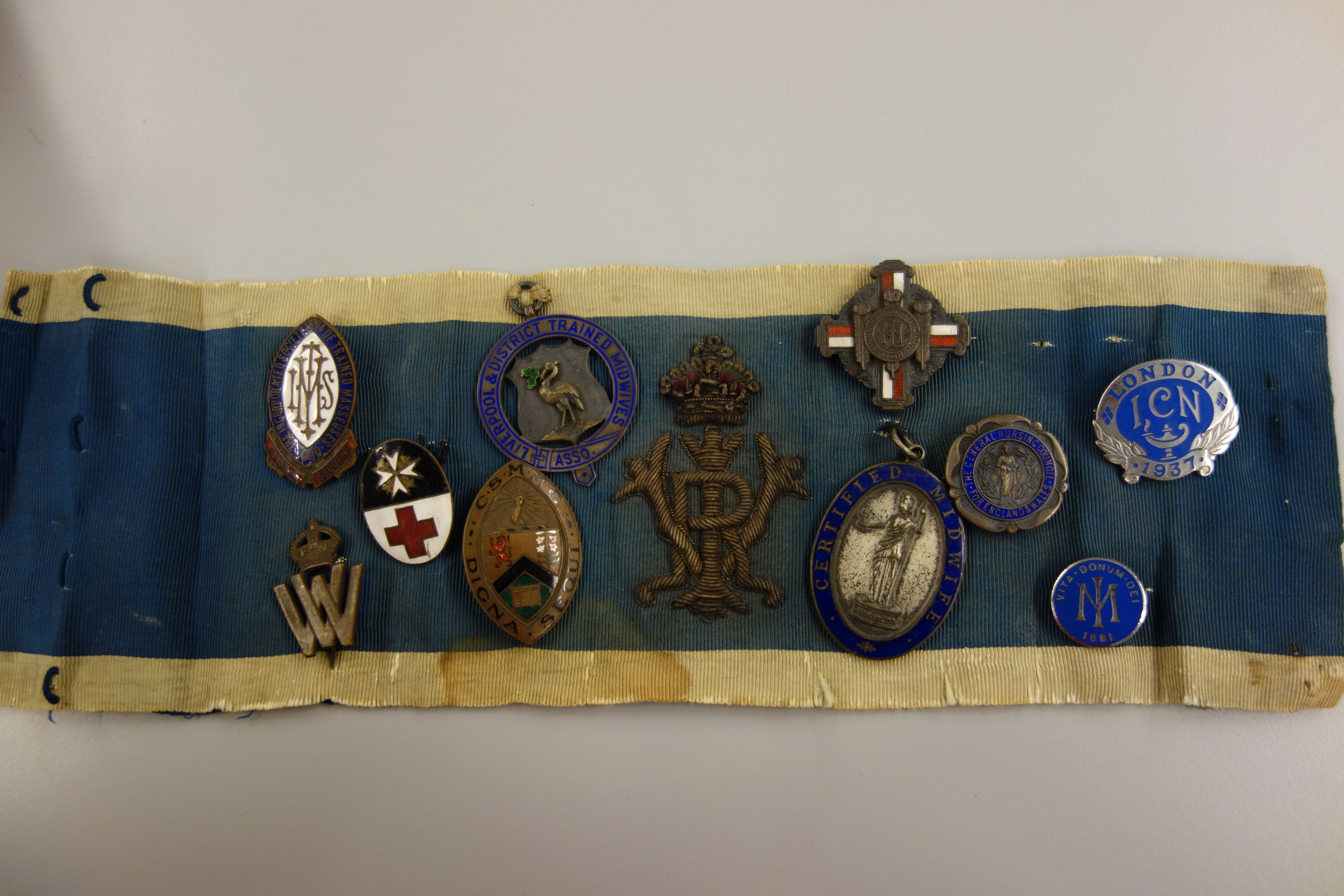
Photo of Rosalind Paget's badges

During her training at The London Hospital she completed maternity training at the British Lying-In Hospital, and obtained the London Obstetrical Society certificate in January 1885. In the 1890s she played an active role in the campaign for midwife registration, giving evidence in 1892 to the select committee on midwifery, but it was not until 1902 that the Midwives Act was passed. It made it an offence for anyone not properly certificated to describe herself, or practice, as a midwife, and established the Central Midwives' Board, of which Paget was a member until 1924. She was awarded the Certificate of the Central Midwives Board in October 1903. Paget was an active member of the Matron's Aid Society, later the Midwives' Institute, which is now the Royal College of Midwives. She founded and helped edit the institute's journal, Nursing Notes (which became the Midwives' Chronicle). In 1886 Paget and a fellow sister from The London Hospital were sent by Eva Luckes to learn medical massage under Miss Buckworth, and both became Medical Masseuses. She was a founder member of the Society of Trained Masseuses, which later became the Chartered Society of Physiotherapy. Rosalind Paget was a supporter of women's suffrage; in July 1908 she led 20 members in a suffrage procession under the banner of Florence Nightingale.

== Personal life ==
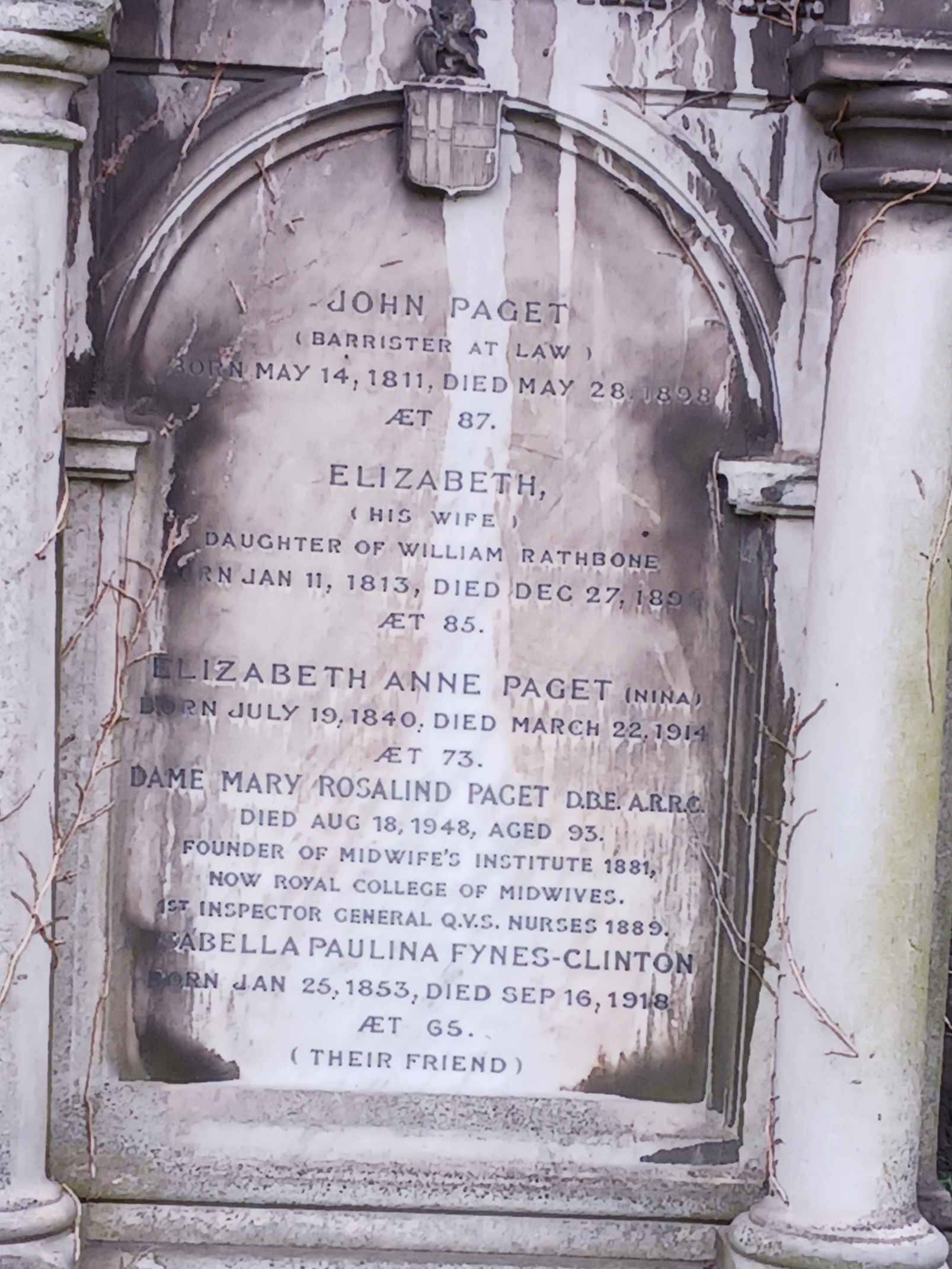
Paget family memorial in Brompton Cemetery

Paget was the daughter of John Paget and his wife, Elizabeth (née Rathbone). She was a niece of the social reformer William Rathbone VI who contributed to the development of the Queens Nursing Institute. She never married. She died in 1948, aged 93. Paget is remembered on a family memorial in Brompton Cemetery.

== Honours ==
She was named a Dame Commander of the Order of the British Empire in 1935.

== Legacies ==
The Dame Rosalind Paget Memorial Lecture and Rosalind Paget Trust were established in her honour. The University of Greenwich operates The Rosalind Paget Lab, a clinical skills lab used to teach student midwives, nurses and paramedics.
