= Skill mix =

Collection of skills present in a workplace

Skill mix is the combination or grouping of different categories of workers that is employed in any field of work. In the context of health care provision it can be applied to broad (e.g. national) macro level planning or micro level in the context of local service delivery.

In the context of health care provision, it can refer to:

- a combination of skills available at a specific time;
- a mix of posts in a given facility;
- a mix of employees in a post;
- a combination of activities that comprises each role;
- differences across occupational groups such as nurses and physicians or between various sectors of the health system; or
- a mix within an occupational group such as between different types of nursing providers with different level of training and different wage rates.
