= City Hospital, Birmingham =

City Hospital
- Sandwell and West Birmingham Hospitals NHS Trust
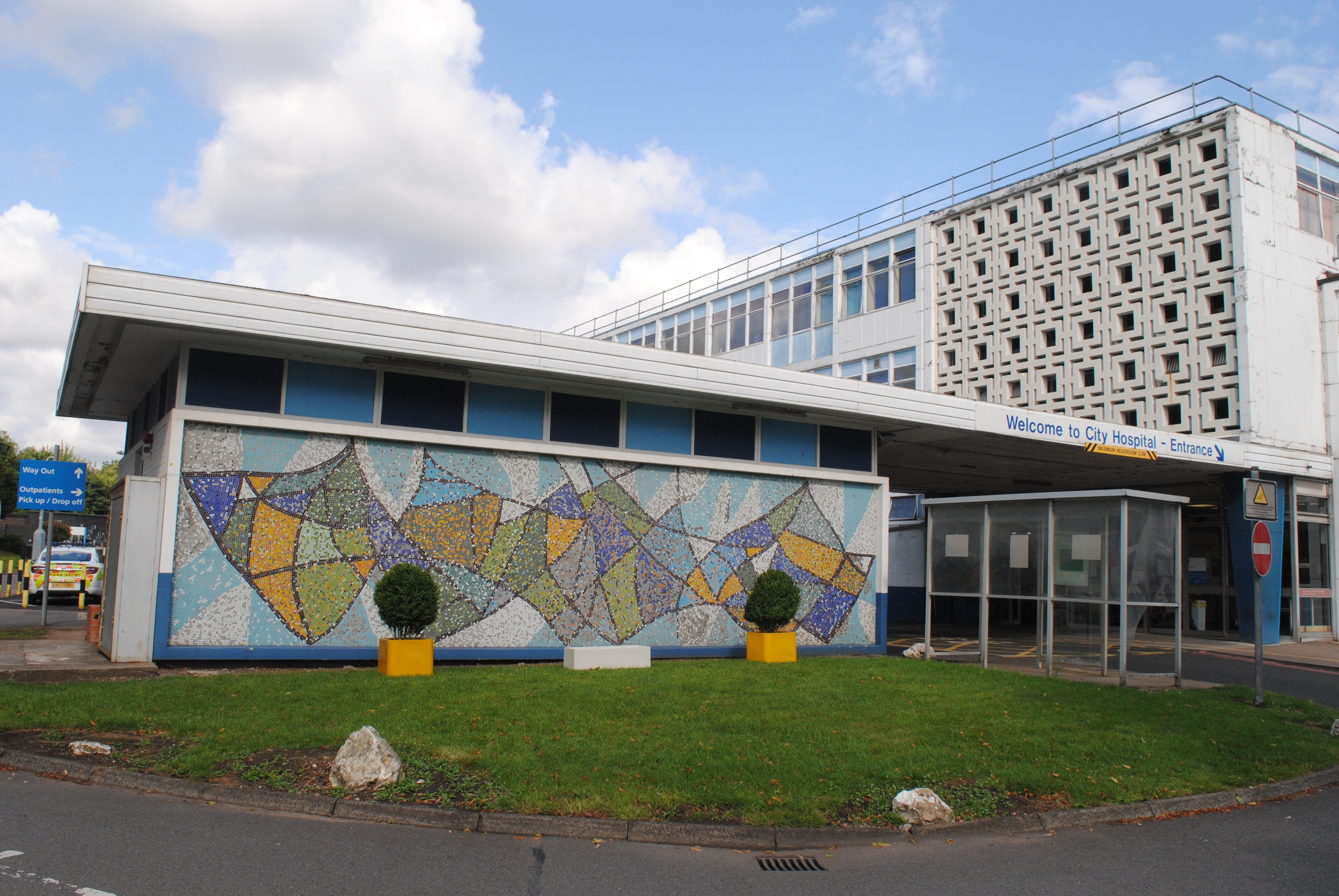
- Mosaic and main entrance block, August 2021

- Shown in West Midlands

Geography
- Location: Winson Green, Birmingham, West Midlands, England, United Kingdom
- Coordinates: 52°29′17″N 1°55′53″W

Organisation
- Care system: Public NHS
- Type: District General
- Affiliated university: University of Birmingham; Aston University; Birmingham City University

Services
- Emergency department: No Accident & Emergency

History
- Founded: 1887

Links
- Website: www.swbh.nhs.uk
- Lists: Hospitals in England

City Hospital (formerly Dudley Road Hospital, and still commonly referred to as such) was a major hospital located in Birmingham, England, operated by the Sandwell and West Birmingham Hospitals NHS Trust. It provided an extensive range of general and specialist hospital services. It is located in the Winson Green area of the west of the city.

It was replaced by the delayed Midland Metropolitan University Hospital, with the Treatment Centre and separate eye hospital, the Birmingham and Midland Eye Centre, remaining on the Dudley Road campus, the rest of which will be redeveloped for housing.

== History ==
The hospital was first built in 1889 as an extension to the Birmingham Union Workhouse (whose entrance building, though derelict, survived until September 2017). It originally comprised a single corridor stretching for a quarter of a mile with nine Nightingale ward blocks radiating from it along its length. The original design was by an architect called W. H. Ward and was designed around a configuration recommended by Florence Nightingale. The first matron was Anne Campbell Gibson, still commemorated with the Ann Gibson meeting rooms in the City Hospital.

It was originally known as the Birmingham Union Infirmary, later Dudley Road Infirmary, before becoming Dudley Road Hospital. One of its notable surgeons, Hamilton Bailey, took the photos for the first edition of his famous textbook while at Dudley Road.

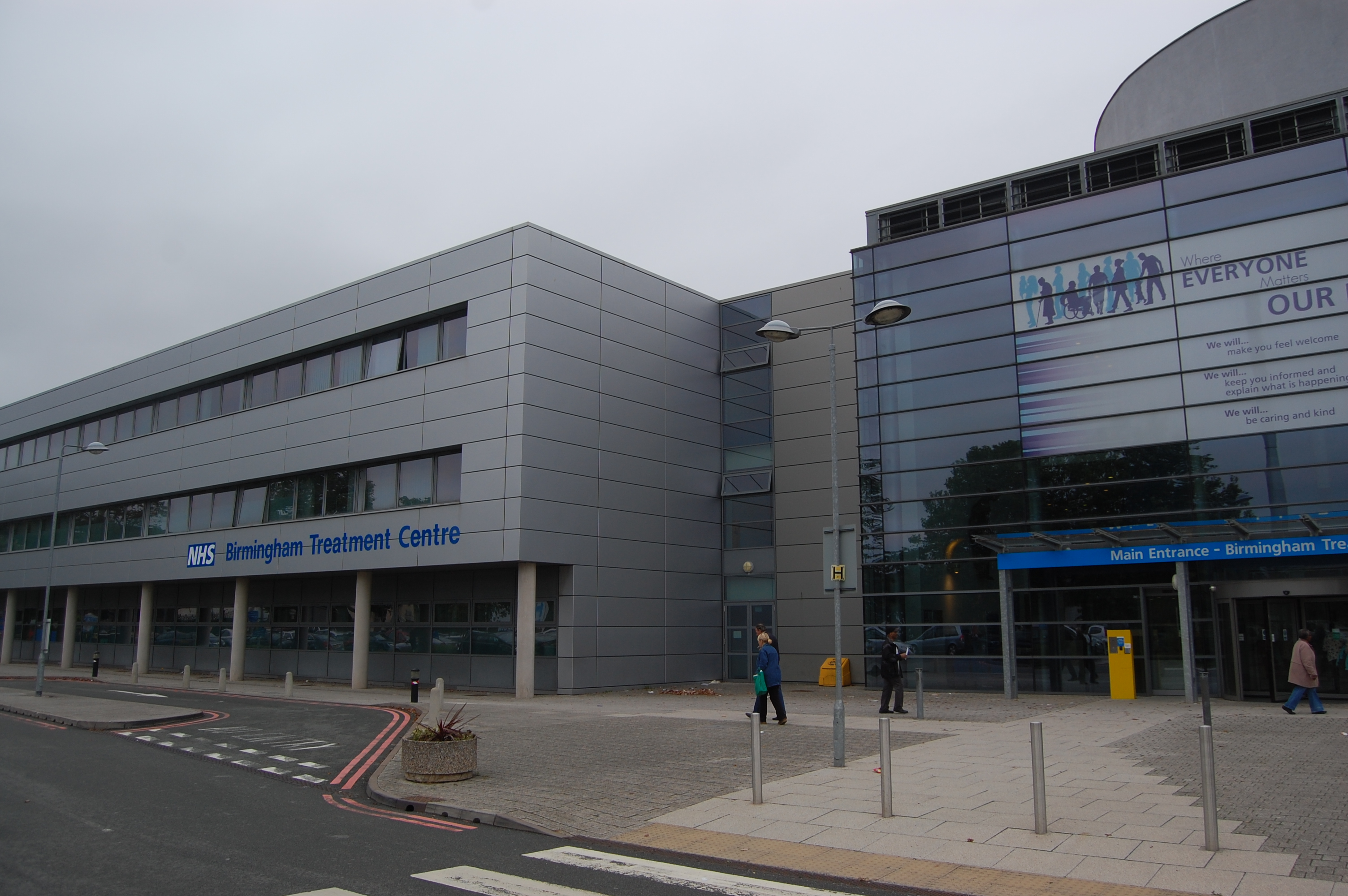
Birmingham Treatment Centre (2013)

The Birmingham Treatment Centre opened on the City Hospital site in November 2005. This diagnosis and treatment centre replaces the existing Outpatient Department.

The hospital's last inpatients were transferred to Midland Metropolitan University Hospital on 11 November 2024, the same day the hospital's accident and emergency unit was closed.

In January 2026, Homes England signed a deal with housebuilder Vistry to demolish most of the former hospital buildings and construct 698 new homes; the historic infirmary building will be converted into 52 one- and two-bedroom flats. Construction will start in late 2026, with the first homes due for completion in early 2027.

In September 2026, over 1 million bricks from the hospital were rescued by Birmingham City FC, and put into storage, for later use to build the chimneys on their Powerhouse stadium.

== Notable staff ==
- Anne Campbell Gibson (1849–1926) matron of the Birmingham Union Infirmary from 1888 to 1912 and notable for her contributions to workhouse nursing and pioneering the establishment of infirmaries separate from workhouses and staffed with trained nurses.
- Marion Caroline Thomas RRC (1877– ), Matron from 1912 until 1925. Thomas trained at The London Hospital under Eva Luckes between 1900 and 1902. After her training she was employed as a Holiday Sister and Matron's Ward Assistant, before becoming matron of the Rutson Hospital in 1910. During the First World War she was also appointed Territorial Force Nursing Service Matron in charge of the military hospital based at the workhouse infirmary: 1st Southern General Hospital, Birmingham, between April 1915 and 1919. Thomas resigned because of ill health in 1925.

== See also ==
- List of hospitals in England
