= William Feilding (British Army officer, born 1836) =

British Army general (1836–1895)

General The Honourable William Feilding
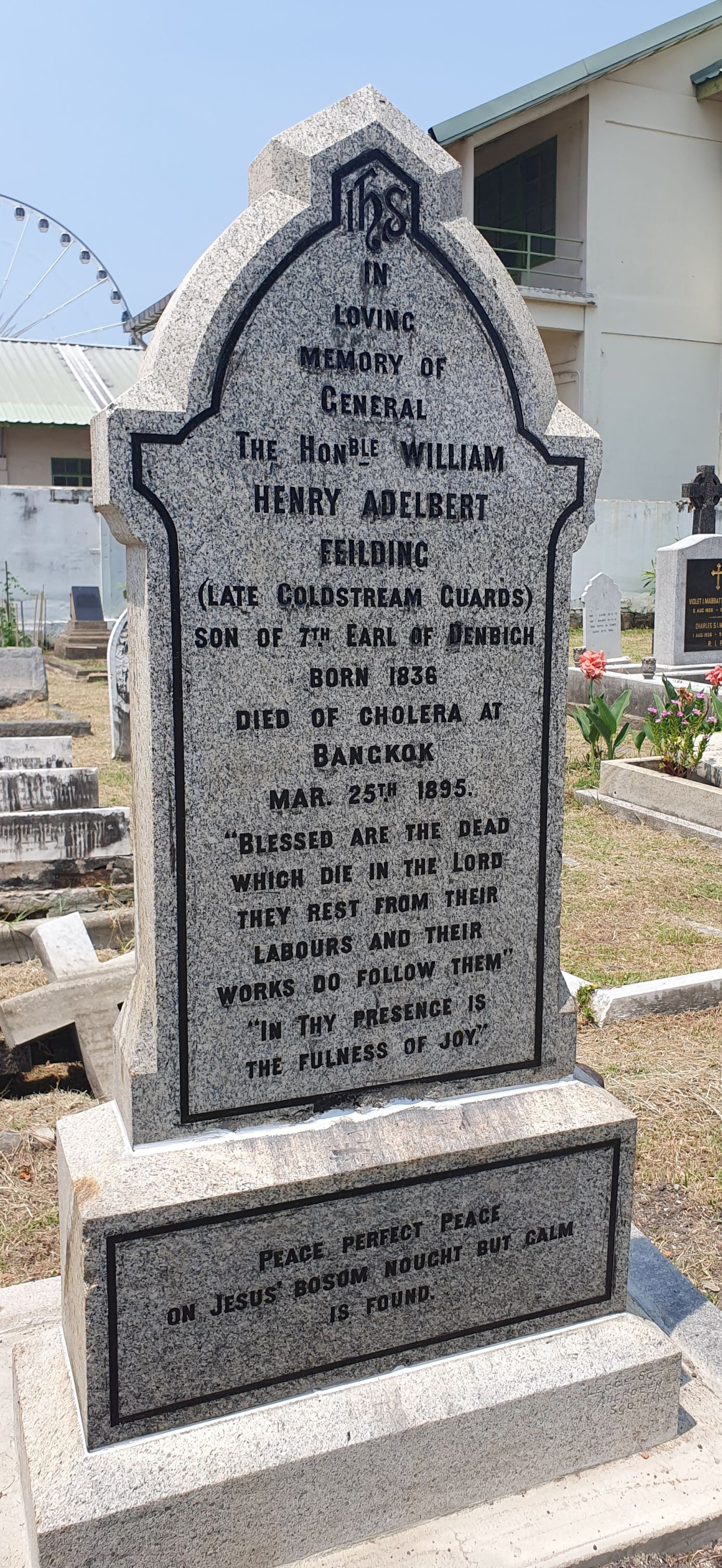
- The grave of Gen. William Feilding in the Bangkok Protestant Cemetery
- Born: William Henry Adelbert Feilding; 6 January 1836
- Died: 25 March 1895 (aged 59); Bangkok, Kingdom of Siam
- Occupation: Soldier
- Known for: Namesake of Feilding, New Zealand
- Spouse: Charlotte Leighton (m. 1893)
- Parent(s): William Feilding, 7th Earl of Denbigh; Lady Mary Moreton

General William Henry Adelbert Feilding (6 January 1836 – 25 March 1895) was a British soldier of the Coldstream Guards.

Feilding was a son of William Feilding, 7th Earl of Denbigh and his wife Lady Mary Elizabeth Kitty Moreton. He served in the Crimean War and was British commissioner to the French Army during the Franco-Prussian War. He was decorated in the field by General Chanzy with the Legion d'honneur for saving the wounded under fire in a burning hospital. He became a Colonel in the Coldstream Guards and was Inspector-General of the Recruiting HQ from 1891 to 1894. The town of Feilding in New Zealand was named after him.

In 1871, the Directors of the Emigrant and Colonist's Aid Corporation began to look at selecting a block of land so they could proceed with their proposed emigration scheme for the labouring class. Feilding, a colonel at the time, and one of the Directors of the Corporation, was selected to travel to both Australia and New Zealand looking at possibilities. During his trip his social standing gave him an entree to the people who mattered in government circles in both countries. Finding the land and conditions of sale and settlement in Australia were not in line with the expectations of the Corporation, Feilding sailed for New Zealand and arrived in Auckland on 2 December 1871. By 12 December he was in Wellington and being put up at Government House at the invitation of Sir George Bowen Governor of New Zealand. By 11.30am that same morning, he was in discussion with "the ministers at the Government building" about possible blocks of land that might suit the Corporation. Co-operation was such that Feilding was able to request a rough draft of possible conditions the New Zealand Government would be prepared to offer the Corporation by the very next day.

Feilding journeyed by coach up the coast to Foxton near to mouth of the Manawatū River, where he was met by Arthur Halcombe whose job it was to escort him to view an area of inland Manawatū that the New Zealand Government had available for sale. On 15 December the two men left Foxton on horseback and rode to Palmerston North. After lunch they rode first to what is now the town of Ashhurst, then walked five miles to the Manawatū Gorge where the first roadway through the gorge was being formed.

On Saturday 16 December Halcombe and Feilding rode through what was to become the Manchester Block. The two men were guided by James Whisker, who with his brother-in-law John Hughey leased land from the Ngati Kawhata on the banks of the Oroua River. Feilding spent the night at "Westoe" with Sir William Fox and his wife. During his exploration of the area Feilding spent several restless and feverish nights plagued by mosquitoes which bit him even through his corduroy trousers; he had to borrow a pair of slippers to be able to hobble around as his feet were so swollen. Back in Wellington on 20 December at the negotiating table, an agreement was made to purchase the 106,000 acre (400 km²) Manchester Block for the price of £75,000 from the Wellington Provincial Government. Recruiting of emigrants could now begin in England.

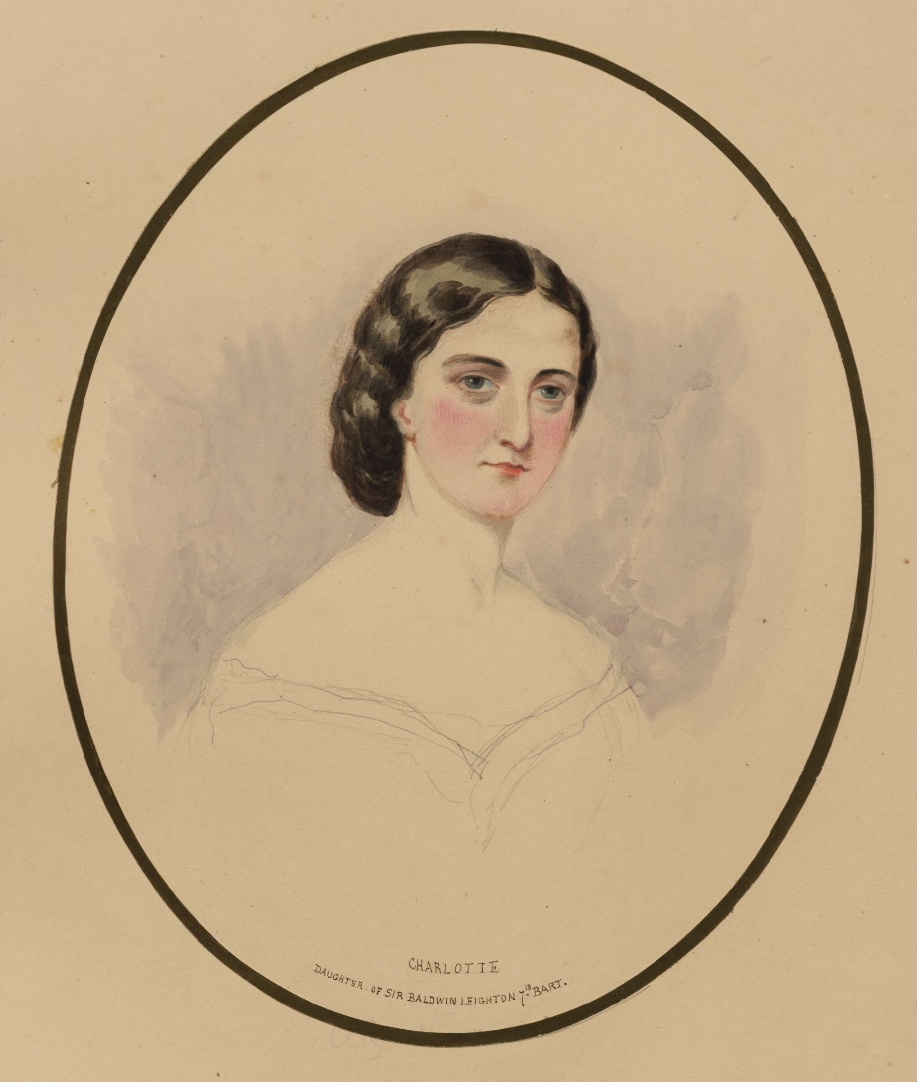
Charlotte d. of Sir Baldwyn Leighton, Fielding's wife

Colonel Feilding came back to New Zealand to visit the new settlement of Feilding for the first time in 1875. Immigrants had been arriving for a year and life had been a struggle for them. A horribly wet winter had made conditions even more miserable for those who had been expecting green fields and landscape similar to what they had left behind in England. Feilding spoke to an open-air meeting of settlers from the veranda of the Corporation's office, giving practical advice on coming to terms with their life, and sympathy for those who had found the going tough. He tried to sort out any immediate grievances and problems that he could.

Great progress followed and in 1895 when Feilding - by then General Feilding - made his next and last visit to the town named after him, he was able to view a thriving settlement. He stayed at Mrs Martha Hastie's Feilding Hotel, then a substantial two-storeyed wooden building with fifty rooms for guests, a sample room, a big dining room, and an adjoining assembly room. There was also a large orchard. Feilding must have felt satisfied to see the swampy clearing he had ridden though only twenty-four years before was now an established little town.

Feilding died of cholera in Bangkok and is buried in the Bangkok Protestant Cemetery. Feilding married Charlotte Leighton, daughter of Sir Baldwin Leighton, 7th Baronet.
