= Gibbons (surname) =

Gibbons is an Irish, Scottish and English surname of Norman origin. The surname was first found in the counties of Limerick and Mayo, in which two distinct families arose shortly after the Norman invasion of Ireland during the 12th century.

The surname is derived from "Gibb", a short form of the popular Norman personal name Gilbert, which was first introduced in the 11th century by followers of William the Conqueror after the Norman Conquest of England. It was originally derived from the name Gislebert or Gillebert, which is composed of the Germanic elements Gisil which means "hostage", "pledge", or "noble youth," and berht, which means "bright" or "famous."

Most of those with the surname hail from Mayo and are a branch of the great Burke family, which played a prominent role in the Norman invasion. They were originally known as "MacGibbon Burke" or "Mac Giobúin, son of Gilbert" (de Burgh). They were noted to have integrated into the local culture and customs more completely than other Norman invaders, intermarrying with native noble Irish and becoming "more Irish than the Irish themselves".

The family from Limerick is a branch of the aristocratic FitzGerald dynasty. They were knights descended from the Irish baron John FitzThomas (FitzGerald), ancestor of The Earls of Desmond and grandson of the Norman baron Maurice FitzGerald, Lord of Llanstephan. The second branch of the FitzGerald family came to be known as "FitzGibbon" and were given the title of the White Knight, holding territory in southeast Limerick, near County Cork. The other two branches of the family were known as the Green Knight and the Black Knight, both of which kept the FitzGerald name.

== Notable people ==
=== Surname ===
- Abigail Hopper Gibbons (1801–1893), American schoolteacher, abolitionist, and social welfare activist
- Alan Gibbons (born 1953), English writer
- Arthur T. Gibbons (1903–1986), American businessman and politician
- Beth Gibbons (born 1965), English singer and songwriter
- Billy Gibbons (born 1949), American rock musician
- Brian Gibbons (born 1988), American ice hockey player
- Bunny Gibbons, American funfair owner
- Carroll Gibbons (1903–1954), American-born British bandleader
- Cedric Gibbons (1893–1960), American art director
- Christopher Gibbons (1615–1676), English composer, son of Orlando
- Conor Gibbons, Irish Gaelic footballer
- D. Barry Gibbons (1929–1998), American politician
- Dave Gibbons (born 1949), English comic book artist and writer
- Sir David Gibbons (politician) (1927–2014), Prime Minister of Bermuda
- Edward Gibbons (1568 – before 1650), English musician, brother of Orlando
- Edward Stanley Gibbons (1840–1913), philatelist and founder of Stanley Gibbons Ltd.
- Elizabeth Joan Gibbons (1902–1988), British botanist
- Ellis Gibbons (1573–1603), English composer, brother of Orlando
- Elsie Gibbons (1903–2003), Canadian politician
- Euell Gibbons (1911–1975), outdoorsman and proponent of natural diets
- Franco Gibbons, Palauan politician
- Frank George Gibbons (1899–1932), British military aviator
- Frederick Gibbons, American psychologist
- Gary Gibbons (born 1946), British theoretical physicist
- Sir George Christie Gibbons, KC (1848–1918), Canadian lawyer and businessman
- George Everard Gibbons (1896–1923), British flying ace
- Gillian Gibbons (born 1953), British woman arrested in Sudan for naming a teddy bear Muhammad
- Grinling Gibbons (1648–1721), master wood carver
- Gwilym Gibbons (born 1971), British arts leader
- Harold J. Gibbons, American trade unionist and labor leader
- Herbert Adams Gibbons (1880–1934), American journalist
- Herbert Gladstone Coe Gibbons (1905–1963), English cricketer
- Hope Gibbons (1856–1947), New Zealand businessman
- Ian Gibbons (musician) (1952–2019), English keyboardist, member of The Kinks
- J. Whitfield Gibbons (born 1939), American herpetologist
- James Gibbons (disambiguation)
- Jay Gibbons (born 1977), American baseball player
- Jean D. Gibbons (born 1938), American statistician
- Jim Gibbons (disambiguation)
- John C. Gibbons (died 2021), Palauan politician
- John Gibbons (born 1962), American baseball player and manager
- John H. Gibbons (scientist) (1929–2015), American scientist and Whitehouse advisor
- John Joseph Gibbons (1924–2018), American lawyer and judge
- John Lloyd Gibbons (1837–1919), British politician
- Jenni Gibbons (born 1988), Canadian astronaut
- June and Jennifer Gibbons (born 1963, 1963–1993), identical twins known as "The Silent Twins" since they only communicated with each other
- Kieran Gibbons (born 1995), Scottish footballer
- Ken Gibbons (1931–2024), British Anglican priest
- Leeza Gibbons (born 1957), American television personality
- Lile Gibbons, American politician
- Lyman Gibbons (1808–1879), Justice of the Alabama Supreme Court
- Norah Gibbons (1952–2020), Irish children's advocate and social worker
- Orlando Gibbons (1583–1625), English composer
- Paul Gibbons (born 1971), New Zealand pole vaulter
- Peter Gibbons (born 1962), Canadian racing driver
- Robert Gibbons (disambiguation)
- Sam Gibbons (1920–2012), American politician and distinguished World War II Veteran
- Scott Gibbons (born 1969), American composer
- Shay Gibbons (1929–2006), Irish international footballer
- Simon Gibbons, Professor of Phytochemistry at the School of Pharmacy, University of London
- Stella Gibbons (1902–1989), English author
- Steve Gibbons (disambiguation)
- Thomas Gibbons (disambiguation)
- Walter Gibbons (1954–1994), American DJ and record producer
- William Gibbons (congressman) (1726–1800), American lawyer and delegate to the Continental Congress
- William Conrad Gibbons (1926–2015), American military historian
- William Ernest Gibbons (1898–1976), British politician
- William M. Gibbons (1919–1990), American lawyer and railroad executive
- Yutaka Gibbons (1944–2021), Palauan activist and politician

=== Given name ===
- Gibbons Bagnall (1719–1800), English poetical writer

=== Fictional characters ===
- Augustus Eugene Gibbons, a fictional character portrayed by Samuel L. Jackson in the xXx trilogy
- Gibbons, a fictional character in The Adventures of Tintin
- Peter Gibbons, a character from the popular cult movie Office Space
- Portia Gibbons, a fictional character in The Mighty B!

== See also ==
- Gibbon (surname)
