= Fitzgibbon =

Fitzgibbon Mac Giobúin
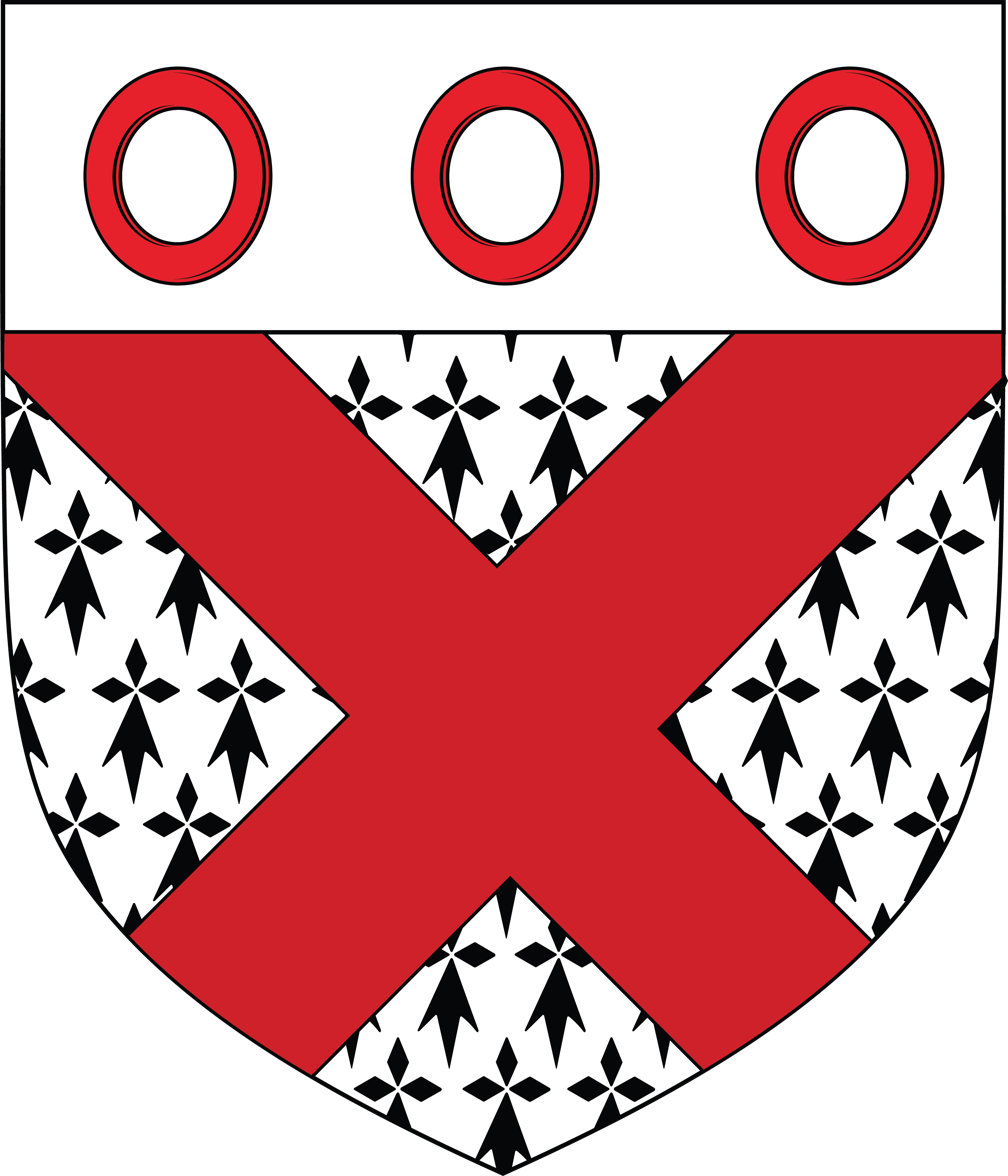
- Argent a saltire gules
- Etymology: "son of Gibbon"
- Origin: Ireland
- Titles: White Knight (Fitzgibbon family); Earl of Clare

Fitzgibbon, FitzGibbon, Fitz-Gibbon and Fitzgibbons are Irish surnames of Hiberno-Norman origin.

The surname originates with Gilbert (Gibbon) FitzJohn, who was an illegitimate son of John FitzThomas, 1st Baron Desmond (died 1261); the line of Anglo-Norman aristocracy in Ireland descended from Gilbert became known as Fitzgibbon. Fitzgibbon means "son of Gibbon", derived from Norman French fiz/fitz (meaning "son") and Gibbon (a Norman French affectionate form of the name Gilbert). The Gaelicised form of Fitzgibbon is Mac Giobúin.

== Overview ==
The Fitzgibbon families of the present day are to be found concentrated in the parts of the Ireland in which they originated. The most numerous are those of County Mayo: the MacGibbon Burke, being a branch of the Hiberno-Irish sept of Burke in County Mayo. Ballymacgibbon in County Mayo takes its name from them. They were Gaelicised more completely than other Norman invaders, intermarrying with native Irish and becoming more Irish than the Irish themselves.

The others are equally associated with a particular county, in this case County Limerick. The head of this family in County Limerick was known as the White Knight, being one of the three hereditary knights in Desmond (unique among British and Irish titles), the other two being the Green Knight and the Black Knight, who are FitzGeralds. Their territory prior to the upheaval of the 17th century was the south-eastern corner of County Limerick near County Cork.

The best known of the Fitzgibbons was John 'Black Jack' Fitzgibbon (1749–1802), Lord Chancellor of Ireland, whose pro-English and anti-Catholic activity at the time of the Acts of Union made him hated in his own day and his memory reviled since.

== Notable people ==
Notable people with the name include:

- Abraham Fitzgibbon (1823–1887), Irish-born railroad engineer
- Agnes Dunbar Moodie Fitzgibbon (1833–1913), Canadian artist
- Allan Fitzgibbon (born before 1968), Australian rugby league footballer
- Andrew Fitzgibbon (1845–1883), Irish soldier who may have been the youngest recipient of the Victoria Cross
- Andrew Fitzgibbon (Engineer) (born 1968), Irish computer vision researcher
- Bernice Fitz-Gibbon (1894–1982), American advertising executive
- Carol Fitz-Gibbon (1938–2017), British educational researcher and analyst
- Coleen Fitzgibbon (born 1950), American experimental film artist
- Constantine Fitzgibbon (1919–1983), American-born historian, translator and novelist
- Craig Fitzgibbon (born 1977), Australian rugby league footballer
- Daniel Fitzgibbon, (born 1976), Australian Paralympic sailor who competed in the 2008 and 2012 Summer Paralympics
- Darragh Fitzgibbon (born 1997), Irish hurler
- Desmond Fitzgibbon (1890 – after 1945), British flying ace in the Royal Naval Air Service during World War I
- Edmund FitzGibbon (c. 1552–1608), Irish nobleman
- Edmund Fitzgibbon (bishop) (1925–2010), Irish-born Roman Catholic bishop in Nigeria
- Edmond Gerald FitzGibbon (1825–1905), Irish-born Australian barrister and town clerk
- Edward Fitzgibbon (1803–1857), Irish writer who used the pseudonym Ephemera
- Edward E. Fitzgibbon (1847–1909), American farmer, teacher, and politician
- Eric Fitzgibbon (1936–2015), Australian politician
- Fred Fitzgibbon (1917–1999), Australian rules footballer
- Gerald Fitzgibbon (disambiguation), multiple people
- Hanorah Philomena FitzGibbon (1889–1979), New Zealand civilian and military nurse and nursing administrator
- Herb Fitzgibbon (born 1942), U.S. tennis player
- Ian Fitzgibbon (born 1962), Irish film and television actor/director
- James FitzGibbon (1780–1863), British soldier and hero of the War of 1812
- Joe Fitzgibbon (active from 2012), U.S. politician in the state of Washington
- Joel Fitzgibbon (born 1962), Australian politician
- John Fitzgibbon (disambiguation), multiple people
- John Fitzgibbons (1868–1941), American politician
- John Bowler Fitzgibbons (born before 1995), American entrepreneur, businessman, and philanthropist
- Joseph Fitzgibbon (1881–1960), Newfoundland politician
- Lachlan Fitzgibbon (born 1994), Australian rugby league footballer
- Maggie Fitzgibbon (1929–2020), Australian actress and singer
- Sister Mary Irene FitzGibbon (1823–1896), English-born nun who founded the New York Foundling Hospital
- Nick FitzGibbon (born 1987), Canadian football player
- Nora FitzGibbon (1889–1979), New Zealand nurse
- Paul Fitzgibbon (1903–1975), American football player
- Peter Fitzgibbon (born 1975), Irish international rugby union referee
- Pierre Fitzgibbon, Canadian politician, member of the National Assembly of Quebec (from 2018)
- Richard B. Fitzgibbon, Jr. (1920–1956), U.S. murder victim in Vietnam
- Robbie Fitzgibbon (1996–2024), English middle-distance runner
- Rosanne Fitzgibbon (1947–2012), Australian literary editor
- Sally Fitzgibbons (born 1990), Australian professional surfer
- Sandie Fitzgibbon (born before 1982), Irish camogie player
- Shaun Fitzgibbon (born 1986), New Zealand cricketer
- Smacka Fitzgibbon (1930–1979), Australian entertainer
- Theodora FitzGibbon (1916–1991), Irish cookery writer, model and actress
- Thomas Fitzgibbon Moore (active 1800s – after 1837}, Newfoundland constable and politician
- William Fitzgibbon (active 1890s – 1900s), Irish hurler

== See also ==
- Fitzgibbon (disambiguation)
- Gibbons (surname)
- White Knight (Fitzgibbon family), a hereditary knighthood within Ireland
- Fitzgibbon Cup, a trophy for the premier hurling championship among higher education institutions
- Mountshannon House
- Fitz
