= James FitzGerald, 6th Earl of Desmond =

Medieval noble (d. 1462)

James FitzGerald
- Earl of Desmond
- Tenure: 1418-1462
- Predecessor: Thomas FitzJohn FitzGerald
- Successor: Thomas FitzJames FitzGerald
- Died: 1462
- Buried: Youghal
- Spouse: Mary de Burgh
- Issue: Thomas FitzJames FitzGerald; Gerald FitzGerald; Honor FitzGerald; Joan FitzGerald
- Parents: Gerald FitzGerald; Eleanor Butler

James FitzGerald, 6th Earl of Desmond (d. 1462), called 'the Usurper', was a younger son of Gerald FitzGerald, 3rd Earl of Desmond, and Lady Eleanor, daughter of James Butler, 2nd Earl of Ormond.

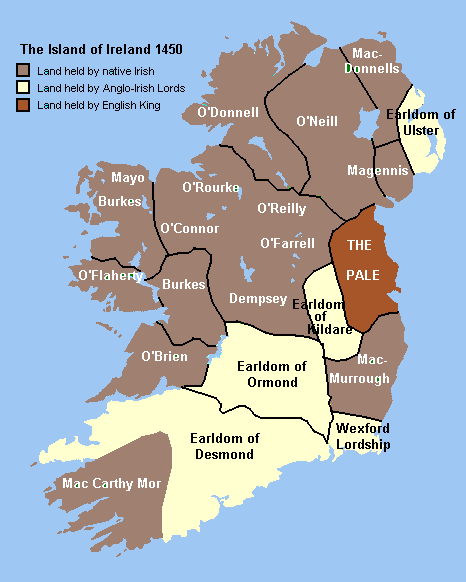
Norman Ireland, showing the Earldom of Desmond in the southwest

== Life ==
The younger brother of John FitzGerald, 4th Earl of Desmond, James was uncle to the 4th Earl's only son Thomas FitzGerald, 5th Earl of Desmond, whom he was able to deprive of his earldom and dispossess in 1418 for marrying far below his station. The marriage between a man of Norman ancestry and a woman of Gaelic blood was in violation of the Statutes of Kilkenny. James FitzGerald took a leading role in forcing his nephew into exile in France where he died at Rouen two years later.

Although not acknowledged until 1422, he was in 1420 made Seneschal of Imokilly, Inchiquin, and the town of Youghal, by James Butler, 4th Earl of Ormond. Also in 1420, he founded the Franciscan friary at Askeaton Abbey.

In 1423 he was made Constable of Limerick for life. In 1445 he was excused attendance at Parliament. Along with his son-in-law Thomas FitzGerald, 7th Earl of Kildare, James was a prominent Irish supporter of the House of York.

He was also godfather to George Plantagenet, 1st Duke of Clarence.

Dying in 1462 or 1463, Desmond was buried at the Franciscan friary in Youghal.

== Marriage and issue ==
James married Mary, daughter of William de Burgh, and they had issue two sons:

1. Thomas FitzGerald, 7th Earl of Desmond
2. Sir Gerald Mor FitzGerald, ancestor of the FitzGerald Lords of Decies of County Waterford

and two daughters:

1. Honor, married Thomas Fitzmaurice., Lord of Kerry
2. Joan/Jane, married Thomas FitzGerald, 7th Earl of Kildare

== Ancestry ==
Ancestors of James FitzGerald, 6th Earl of Desmond

Maurice FitzJohn FitzGerald, son of John FitzGerald, 1st Baron Desmond
Thomas FitzGerald, 2nd Baron Desmond
Joan de Cogan of Carrigaline
Maurice FitzGerald, 1st Earl of Desmond
Margaret de Barry
Gerald FitzGerald, 3rd Earl of Desmond
Nicholas FitzMaurice, 3rd Baron of Kerry and Lixnaw
Aveline fitz Nicholas
Slany O'Brien
James FitzGerald, 6th Earl of Desmond
Edmund Butler, Earl of Carrick
James Butler, 1st Earl of Ormond
Joan FitzGerald, Countess of Carrick
James Butler, 2nd Earl of Ormond
Humphrey de Bohun, 7th Earl of Hereford
Eleanor de Bohun
Joan de Bohun, Countess of Hereford
Eleanor Butler
Roger Darcy
John Darcy, 1st Baron Darcy de Knayth, Justiciar of Ireland
Isabel d'Aton
Elizabeth Darcy
Richard Óg de Burgh, 2nd Earl of Ulster
Joan de Burgh
Margaret de Burgh

== Notes ==
Peerage of Ireland
Preceded by Thomas FitzGerald	Earl of Desmond; 1st creation 1418–1463	Succeeded by Thomas FitzJames
