= Thomas FitzGerald, 5th Earl of Desmond =

Thomas FitzGerald
- Earl of Desmond
- Tenure: 1399-1418
- Predecessor: John FitzGerald
- Successor: James FitzGerald
- Born: c. 1386
- Died: 10 August 1420; Rouen
- Buried: Paris
- Spouse: Catherine MacCormac
- Issue: Maurice FitzGerald; John Claragh
- Parents: John FitzGerald; Mary Bourke or Joan of Fermoy

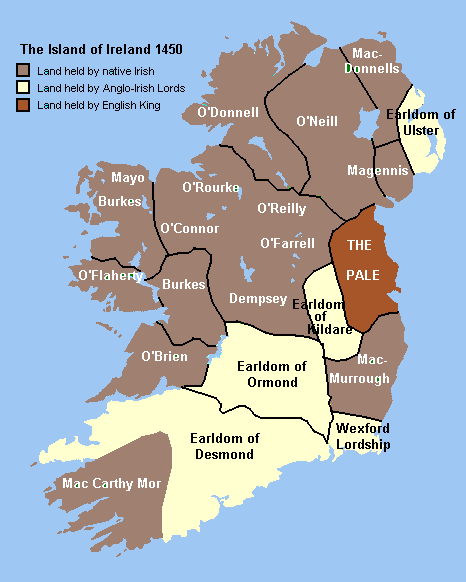
Norman Ireland, showing the Earldom of Desmond in the southwest

Thomas FitzGerald, 5th Earl of Desmond (c. 1386–1420), was the only son of John FitzGerald, 4th Earl of Desmond. Upon John's death in 1399, Thomas succeeded to the earldom of Desmond, which lay in Munster, in the southwest of Ireland.

In 1418, Thomas was dispossessed of his lands and deprived of his earldom by his paternal uncle, James FitzGerald, 6th Earl of Desmond, after Thomas had concluded a marriage far below his station to Catherine MacCormac of Abbeyfeale; Catherine was the daughter of one of Thomas's dependants, William MacCormac, known as "the Monk of Feale." A marriage between a man of Norman blood and a woman of Gaelic ancestry was in violation of the Statutes of Kilkenny.

This ill-fated romance was the subject of the air "Desmond's Song" by the Irish poet Thomas Moore.

After the loss of his earldom, Thomas withdrew to France, where he "died at Rouen, 10th August 1420, and was buried at Paris 'with great and mighty show, where the two kings of England and France were present'".

== Marriage and issue ==
Thomas FitzGerald and Catherine MacCormac (a.k.a. Katherine McCormick) of Abbyfeale had two sons:

1. Maurice, ancestor of the FitzGeralds of Adare and Broghill,
2. John Claragh, who died in 1452.

Ancestors of Thomas FitzGerald, 5th Earl of Desmond

Thomas FitzGerald, 2nd Baron Desmond
Maurice FitzGerald, 1st Earl of Desmond
Margaret de Barry
Gerald FitzGerald, 3rd Earl of Desmond
Nicholas FitzMaurice, 2nd Baron of Kerry and Lixnaw
Aveline fitz Nicholas
Slany O'Brien
John FitzGerald, 4th Earl of Desmond
James Butler, 1st Earl of Ormond
James Butler, 2nd Earl of Ormond
Eleanor de Bohun
Eleanor Butler
John Darcy, 1st Baron Darcy de Knayth, Justiciar of Ireland
Elizabeth Darcy
Joan de Burgh
Thomas FitzGerald, 5th Earl of Desmond
Joan of Fermoy

== Notes ==
Peerage of Ireland
Preceded by John FitzGerald	Earl of Desmond; 1st creation 1399–1418	Succeeded by James FitzGerald
