= Gibbons =

Gibbons may refer to:

- Gibbon, an ape in the family Hylobatidae
- Gibbons (surname)
- Gibbons, Alberta
- Gibbons (automobile), a British light car of the 1920s
- Gibbons P.C., a leading American law firm headquartered in New Jersey
- Gibbons, a character from Tom Goes to the Mayor

== See also ==
- Gibbons v. Ogden, an 1824 United States Supreme Court case
- Justice Gibbons (disambiguation)
- Gibbon (disambiguation)
