= Thomas FitzGerald, 3rd Baron Desmond =

Thomas FitzGerald
- Baron Desmond
- Tenure: 1296-1307
- Predecessor: Thomas FitzMaurice FitzGerald
- Successor: Maurice FitzThomas FitzGerald
- Born: c. 1290
- Died: 1307
- Parents: Thomas FitzMaurice FitzGerald; Margaret Berkeley

Thomas FitzThomas FitzGerald, 3rd Baron of Desmond (c. 1290 - 1307), succeeded to the barony of Desmond, which lay in Munster, in the south of Ireland, in 1296, at the age of six, upon the death of his father, Thomas FitzGerald, 2nd Baron Desmond. Thomas died young while still unmarried and childless, and was succeeded by his brother, Maurice FitzThomas FitzGerald.

Ancestors of Thomas FitzGerald, 3rd Baron Desmond

Thomas FitzMaurice FitzGerald, Lord of O'Connelloe
John FitzGerald, 1st Baron Desmond
Sadbh
Maurice FitzJohn FitzGerald
Thomas FitzGerald, 2nd Baron Desmond
John de Cogan of Carrigaline
Joan de Cogan
Thomas FitzThomas FitzGerald, 3rd Baron of Desmond
Lord Barry of Olethan
Margaret de Barry

== Notes ==
Peerage of Ireland
| Preceded by Thomas FitzGerald | Baron Desmond; 1296–1307 | Succeeded by Maurice FitzGerald |
