= Maurice FitzGerald, 2nd Earl of Desmond =

Maurice FitzGerald
- Earl of Desmond
- Tenure: 1356-1358
- Predecessor: Maurice FitzThomas FitzGerald
- Successor: Gerald FitzMaurice FitzGerald
- Died: 1358
- Buried: Tralee Abbey
- Spouse: Beatrice de Stafford
- Issue: unnamed daughter who married Domnall Óg Mac Cárthaigh Mór
- Parents: Maurice FitzThomas FitzGerald; Margarete De Barry

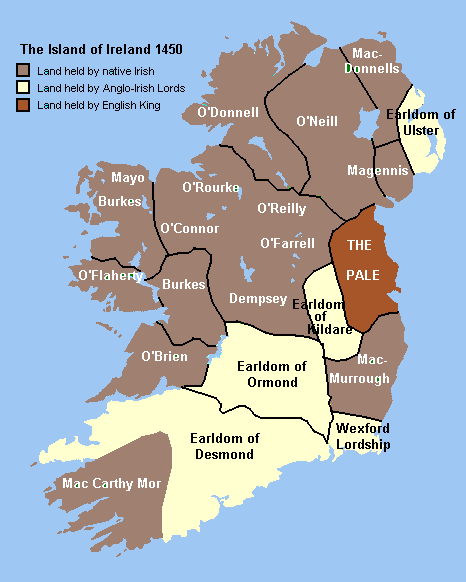
Norman Ireland, showing the Earldom of Desmond in the southwest

Maurice FitzMaurice FitzGerald, 2nd Earl of Desmond (Maurice Óg; died 1358) was the son of Maurice FitzGerald, 1st Earl of Desmond, and his first wife, Catherine de Burgh. (Some sources list her as Margaret.)

The 2nd Earl married Beatrice de Stafford, daughter of Ralph de Stafford, 1st Earl of Stafford and Margaret Audley, but died at Castle Maine without any male issue, and was therefore succeeded in the Earldom of Desmond by his half-brother Gerald FitzGerald, 3rd Earl of Desmond. FitzGerald's widow married Thomas de Ros, 4th Baron de Ros around a year after FitzGerald's death. He was buried in Tralee Abbey.

Ancestors of Maurice FitzGerald, 2nd Earl of Desmond

John FitzGerald, 1st Baron Desmond
Maurice FitzJohn FitzGerald
Thomas FitzGerald, 2nd Baron Desmond
John de Cogan of Carrigaline
Joan de Cogan
Maurice FitzGerald, 1st Earl of Desmond
Lord Barry of Olethan
Margaret de Barry
Maurice FitzGerald, 2nd Earl of Desmond
Richard Mór de Burgh, 1st Baron of Connaught
Walter de Burgh, 1st Earl of Ulster
Egidia de Lacy, Lady of Connacht
Richard Óg de Burgh, 2nd Earl of Ulster
John FitzGeoffrey
Aveline
Isabel Bigod
Catherine de Burgh
Count Arnold III of Guines
Margaret de Guines

Peerage of Ireland
Preceded by Maurice FitzGerald	Earl of Desmond; 1st creation 1356–1358	Succeeded by Gerald FitzGerald
