= Gibbon (disambiguation) =

Gibbons are apes in the family Hylobatidae.

Gibbon may also refer to:

== Places ==
- Gibbon, Minnesota, USA
- Gibbon, Nebraska, USA
- Gibbon, Oregon, USA
- Gibbon Bay, South Orkney Islands, Antarctica
- Ray Gibbon Drive, St Albert, Canada

== Other uses ==
- Gibbon (surname)
  - Edward Gibbon, English historian
- Gibbon (character), a character in Marvel Comics' Spider-Man titles
- Gibbon, a Death Eater character in Harry Potter
- scallion, an edible plant with hollow green leaves
- Malte Gårdinger, a Swedish actor
- Gibbon, a character who is Jake the Dog’s grandson and Charlie‘s son in the animated series Adventure Time

== See also ==
- Gibbons (surname), a surname
- Gutsy Gibbon, a 2007 release of Ubuntu
- "Funky Gibbon", a 1975 song by The Goodies
- Gibbons (disambiguation)
