= John FitzGerald, 4th Earl of Desmond =

John FitzGerald
- Earl of Desmond
- Tenure: 1398-1399
- Predecessor: Gerald FitzMaurice FitzGerald
- Successor: Thomas FitzJohn FitzGerald
- Died: 4 March 1399; Ardfinnan
- Cause of death: drowning
- Buried: Youghal
- Spouse: Mary Bourke or Joan of Fermoy
- Issue: Thomas FitzJohn FitzGerald; Aveline (or Eleanor)
- Parents: Gerald FitzMaurice FitzGerald; Eleanor Butler

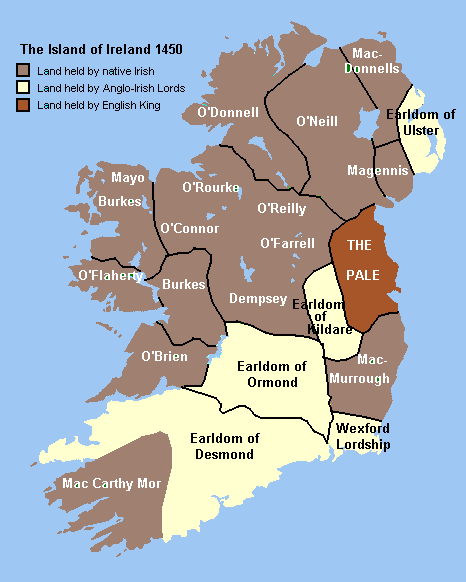
Norman Ireland, showing the earldoms of Desmond and Ormond

John FitzGerald, 4th Earl of Desmond (died 1399) was the son of Gerald FitzGerald, 3rd Earl of Desmond. He married and had one son, Thomas, who succeeded him as Earl of Desmond.

According to Burke, John FitzGerald married Joan Roche, the daughter of Lord Fermoy. On 4 March 1399, FitzGerald drowned at Ardfinnan on the River Suir, returning from an incursion into the territory of the Earl of Ormond.

He was buried at Youghal, and succeeded by his son Thomas FitzJohn FitzGerald, 5th Earl of Desmond.

Ancestors of John FitzGerald, 4th Earl of Desmond

Maurice FitzJohn FitzGerald, son of John FitzGerald, 1st Baron Desmond
Thomas FitzGerald, 2nd Baron Desmond
Joan de Cogan of Carrigaline
Maurice FitzGerald, 1st Earl of Desmond
Margaret de Barry
Gerald FitzGerald, 3rd Earl of Desmond
Nicholas FitzMaurice, 2nd Baron of Kerry and Lixnaw
Aveline fitz Nicholas
Slany O'Brien
John FitzGerald, 4th Earl of Desmond
Edmund Butler, Earl of Carrick
James Butler, 1st Earl of Ormond
Joan FitzGerald, Countess of Carrick
James Butler, 2nd Earl of Ormond
Humphrey de Bohun, 4th Earl of Hereford
Eleanor de Bohun
Elizabeth of Rhuddlan
Eleanor Butler
Roger Darcy
John Darcy, 1st Baron Darcy de Knayth, Justiciar of Ireland
Isabel d'Aton
Elizabeth Darcy
Richard Óg de Burgh, 2nd Earl of Ulster
Joan de Burgh
Margaret de Burgh

Peerage of Ireland
Preceded by Gerald FitzGerald	Earl of Desmond; 1st creation 1398–1399	Succeeded by Thomas FitzGerald
