= Gerald FitzGerald, 3rd Earl of Desmond =

Lord Chief Justice of Ireland (1335–1398)

Gerald FitzGerald
- Earl of Desmond
- Tenure: 1358–1398
- Predecessor: Maurice FitzMaurice FitzGerald
- Successor: John FitzGerald
- Born: Gearóid mac Géarailt; 1335
- Died: 1398 (disappeared)
- Spouse: Eleanor (or Ellen) Butler
- Issue: John FitzGerald; Maurice FitzGerald; James FitzGerald; Robert FitzGerald de Adair; Joan FitzGerald; Catherine FitzGerald
- Parents: Maurice FitzThomas FitzGerald; Aveline (or Eleanor)

Gerald FitzMaurice FitzGerald (1335–1398), also known by the Irish Gaelic Gearóid Iarla (Earl Gerald), was the 3rd Earl of Desmond, in southwestern Ireland, under the first creation of that title, and a member of the Anglo-Norman dynasty of the FitzGerald, or Geraldines. He was the son of Maurice FitzGerald, 1st Earl of Desmond, by his third wife Aveline (Eleanor), daughter of Nicholas FitzMaurice, 3rd Lord of Kerry. He was half-brother to Maurice FitzGerald, 2nd Earl of Desmond.

Maurice Fitzgerald, 2nd Earl of Desmond, would have been followed by Gerald's older brother, Nicholas, but Nicholas was described as "an idiot", and so was passed over for the earldom. Because of this, some older histories list Gerald as the 4th Earl.

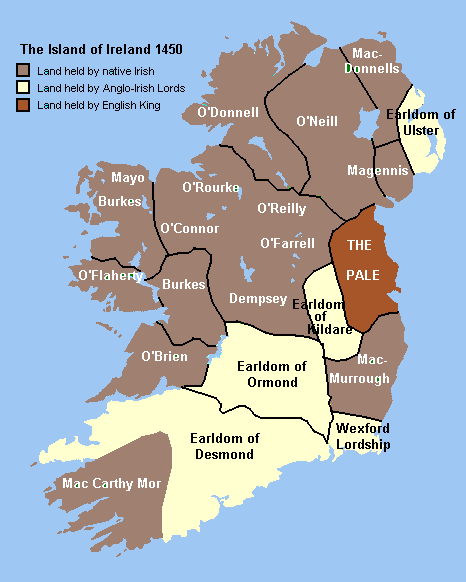
Norman Ireland, showing the Earldom of Desmond in the southwest

== Life ==
In 1356 he was brought to England as a hostage for his father's good behaviour, but as his father died that same year, he was soon released. Three years later, he succeeded his brother Maurice, who had died without male heirs, and became the 3rd Earl of Desmond.

King Edward III confirmed Gerald in his large estates in Munster, provided that he marry Eleanor Butler, daughter of the Justiciar, James Butler, 2nd Earl of Ormond. Gerald did so, but did not make peace with Ormond, nor adopt English ways and customs as expected.

== Career and poetry ==
According to Alfred Webb:

[He was] surnamed 'Gerald the Poet', [and] succeeded to the estates and honours of the family. He married, by the King's command, Eleanor, daughter of James, 2nd Earl of Ormond, who brought with her as her portion the barony of Inchiquin in Imokelly. Gerald was Lord Justice of Ireland, 1367. In 1398 he disappeared, and is fabled to live beneath the waters of Lough Gur, near Kilmallock, on whose banks he appears once every seven years. O'Donovan quotes the following concerning his character: 'A nobleman of wonderful bountie, mirth, cheerfulness in conversation, charitable in his deeds, easy of access, a witty and ingenious composer of Irish poetry, and a learned and profound chronicler; and, in fine, one of the English nobility that had Irish learning and professors thereof in greatest reverence of all the English in Ireland, died penitently after receipt of the sacraments of the holy church in proper form.' Fragments of Anglo-Norman verse attributed to him, known as Proverbs of the Earl of Desmond, survive.

Duanaire Ghearóid Iarla (The Poem-Book of Earl Gerald) is preserved in a fifteenth-century manuscript, the Book of Fermoy. In addition, nine of his poems are preserved in the Book of the Dean of Lismore. Duanaire Ghearóid Iarla was published by Gearóid Mac Niocaill in Studia Hibernica 3 (1963): 7-59.

In 1367 Desmond was made Lord Chief Justice of Ireland, but was soon replaced by Sir William de Windsor. In 1370 Brian O'Brien of Thomond expelled his cousin Turlough. Desmond attempted to reinstate him. Brian marched on Limerick, and defeated Desmond, burning the city and Desmond's lands and imprisoning him.

While in prison, Gerald wrote poetry in Irish, most famously the poem Mairg adeir olc ris na mnáibh (Speak not ill of womankind). Also an accomplished poet in Norman French, Gerald was instrumental in the move by the Desmond Geraldines towards greater use of the Irish language.

== In legend ==
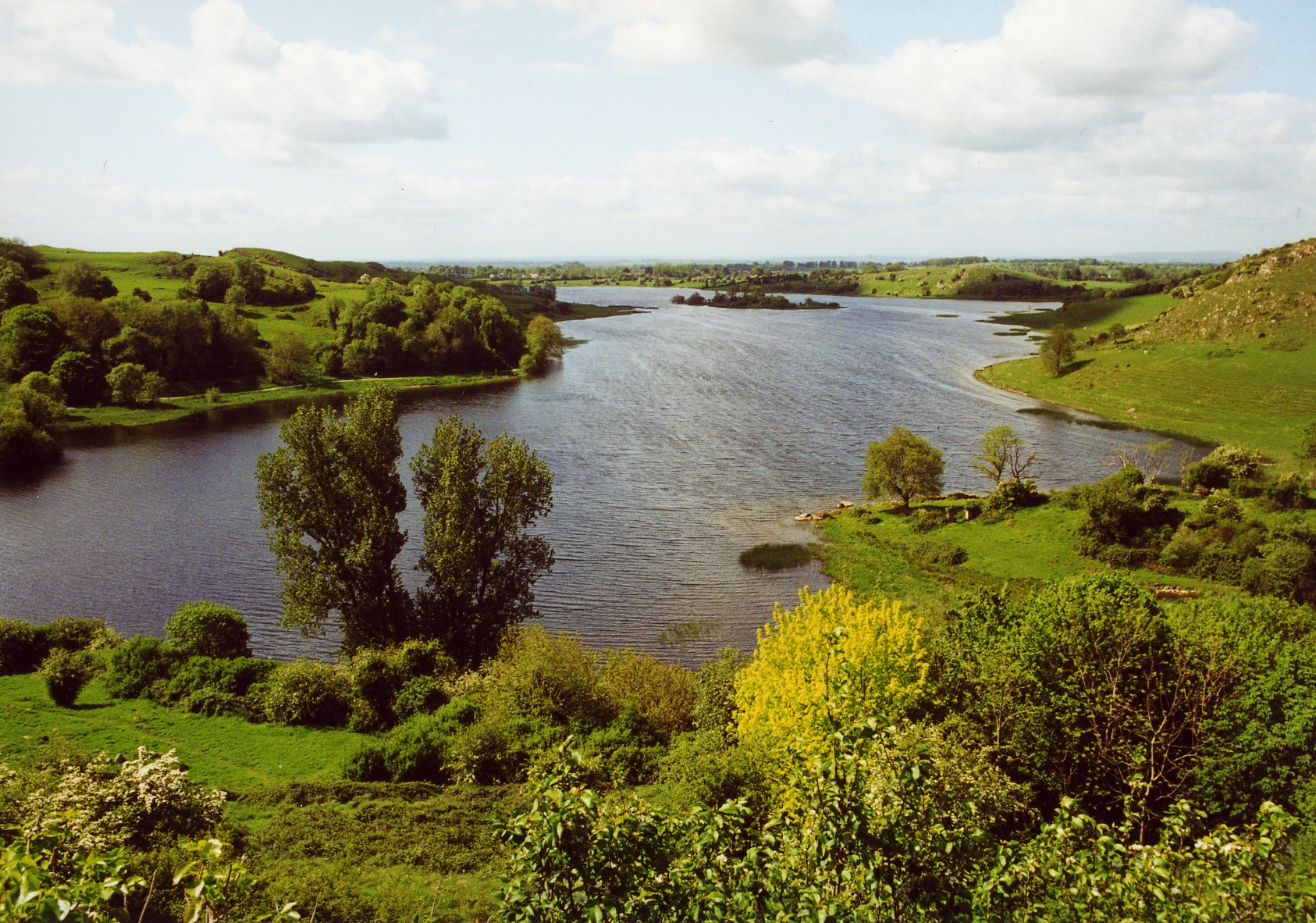
Lough Gur, beneath which Earl Gerald was said to sleep

In legend, Gerald's conception was the result of his father's romantic relationship with, or rape of, the goddess Áine, a legend that draws upon a pre-existing Celtic legend about the King of Munster Ailill Aulom raping this deity, updating it with themes drawn from the Francophone courtly love poetry of Continental Europe, in particular the motif of the man who falls in love with a swan maiden. The Geraldine claim to an association with Áine is typical of the family's Gaelicisation.

After his disappearance in 1398, another legend grew up that Gerald sleeps in a cave beside (or under) Lough Gur, and will someday awaken and ride forth on a silver-shod steed to rule again in Desmond, – one of the many worldwide versions of the King asleep in mountain mythologisation of heroes.

== Marriage and issue ==
In 1359 Gerald married Eleanor (or Ellen) Butler, daughter of James Butler, 2nd Earl of Ormond. She died in 1404. They had four sons:

1. John FitzGerald, 4th Earl of Desmond
2. Maurice FitzGerald
3. James FitzGerald, 6th Earl of Desmond, 'the Usurper'
4. Robert FitzGerald de Adair

and two daughters:

1. Joan, who married Maurice FitzJohn, Lord of Kerry
2. Catherine, who married John FitzThomas

== See also ==
- List of people who disappeared mysteriously (pre-1910)

== Ancestry ==
Ancestors of Gerald FitzGerald, 3rd Earl of Desmond

John FitzGerald, 1st Baron Desmond
Maurice FitzJohn FitzGerald
Thomas FitzGerald, 2nd Baron Desmond
John de Cogan of Carrigaline
Joan de Cogan
Maurice FitzGerald, 1st Earl of Desmond
Lord Barry of Olethan
Margaret de Barry
Gerald FitzGerald, 3rd Earl of Desmond
Nicholas FitzMaurice, 3rd Lord of Kerry
Aveline fitz Nicholas
Slany O'Brien

Peerage of Ireland
Preceded by Maurice FitzGerald	Earl of Desmond; 1st creation 1358–1398	Succeeded by John FitzGerald
