= Osborn Wyddel =

13th century Irish nobleman living in Gwynedd, Wales

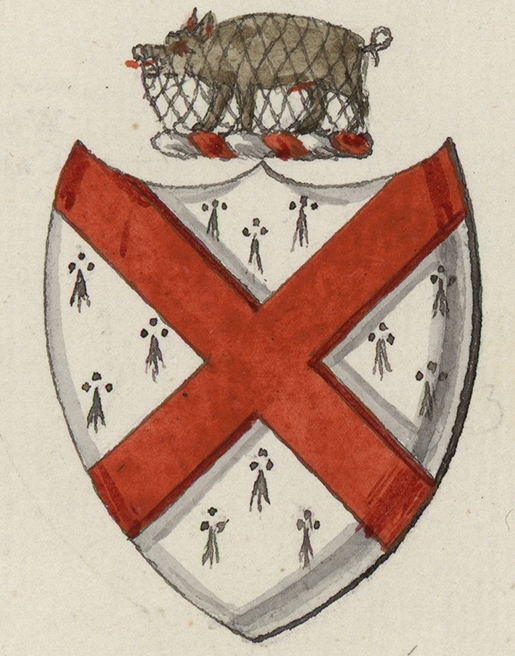
Coat of arms of Osborne Fitzgerald also named Osbern Wyddel

Osborn Wyddel the Irishman (Welsh: Osbwrn Ystiwart Edwart) (fl. 1280), also known as Osborne Fitzgerald, was the founder of the Fitzgerald House of Corsygedol, Wynne of Ynys maengwyn, Wynne of Maes y neuadd, and other important families in Merionethshire. One of its cadet branches is the House of Yale.

== Biography ==
He was an Irishman with some Welsh ancestry, arriving in Wales around 1237. He settled in the neighbourhood of Llanaber, Barmouth, in the latter part of the thirteenth century with the prince of North Wales, Llywelyn ab Iorwerth, and received grants from this monarch in Wales. Tradition, the only authority for his career, asserts that he was a Geraldine, of the Desmond branch of Fitzgerald dynasty, and was attributed, by Sir William Betham, the Ulster King of Arms, as the son of John FitzThomas, 1st Baron Desmond, the first Geraldine lord of Decies and Desmond (d. 1261).

John was the grandson of Maurice FitzGerald, Lord of Lanstephan, and the great-grandson of lord Gerald de Windsor, and princess Nest. The circumstances of Osborn's settlement in Ardudwy (North-west Merionethshire) are unknown, though it may be conjectured that he was driven to seek a home in Wales by the temporary overthrow of the Geraldine influence in Desmond which followed the Battle of Callan (1261). A spot called Berllys (or Byrllysg), a little to the north of Cors y gedol, is pointed out as the site of Osborn's first residence.

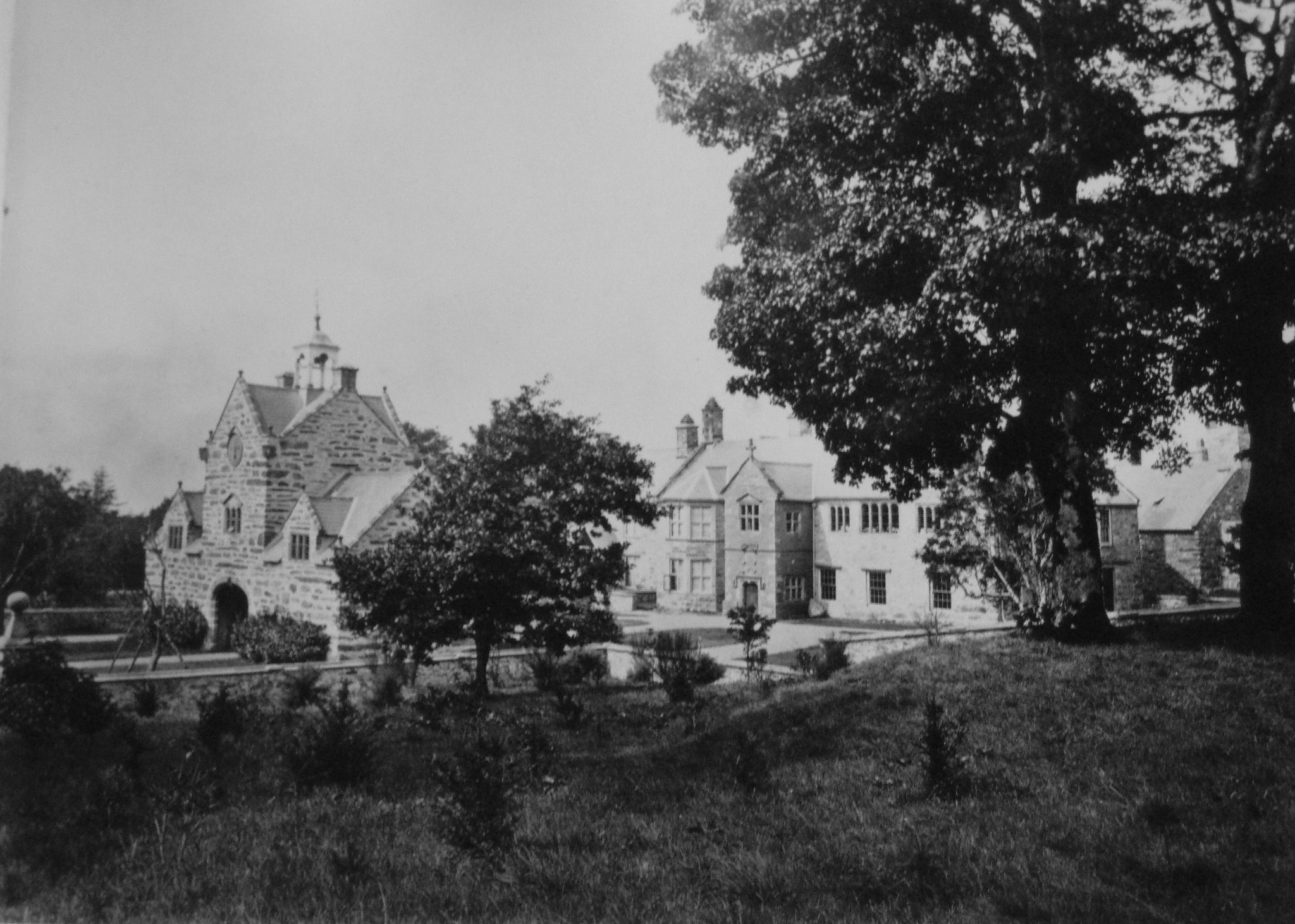
Plas Cors y Gedol, Wales, right side frontage, residence of Osborn

He married thereafter the heiress of Corsygedol in west Merioneth, and had a son named 'Kenric Ab Osbwrn', who became the ancestor of some of the local landed gentry such as the Wynne family of Glyncywarch, Wynne family of Peniarth and Vaughans of Corsygedol. He was assessed in the parish of Llanaber for the fifteenth levied in 1293 or 1294 upon holders of land in Wales, and was probably responsible for the building of Llanaber church. The Corsygedol estate would stay in the same family for over 600 years, being inherited by the House of Vaughan, then the House of Mostyn, until it was sold in 1858 to the House of Corbet.

Genealogists have noted with certainty that Osborn's ancestry was to have descended through numerous Irish Fitz families of Norman-Irish descent; starting with magnate Roger de Montgomery a Norman Knight who fought in the Battle of Hastings, himself a descendant of Danish and Swedish royalty. Then it's speculated that Roger's descendant, Walter FitzOther married Gladys ap Conwym the daughter of a Welsh Prince.

The Norman-Irish families continued to establish themselves after the Norman invasion; the 1st Lord of Offaly was established as the ancestor of the Duke's of Leinster in Dublin, Osborn's father has been noted as John FitzThomas, 1st Baron Desmond a man who he fought alongside at the Battle of Callann. John FitzThomas's great-grandmother is noted as being Nest ferch Rhys, daughter Rhys ap Tewdwr the last king of Deheubarth.

== Gallery ==
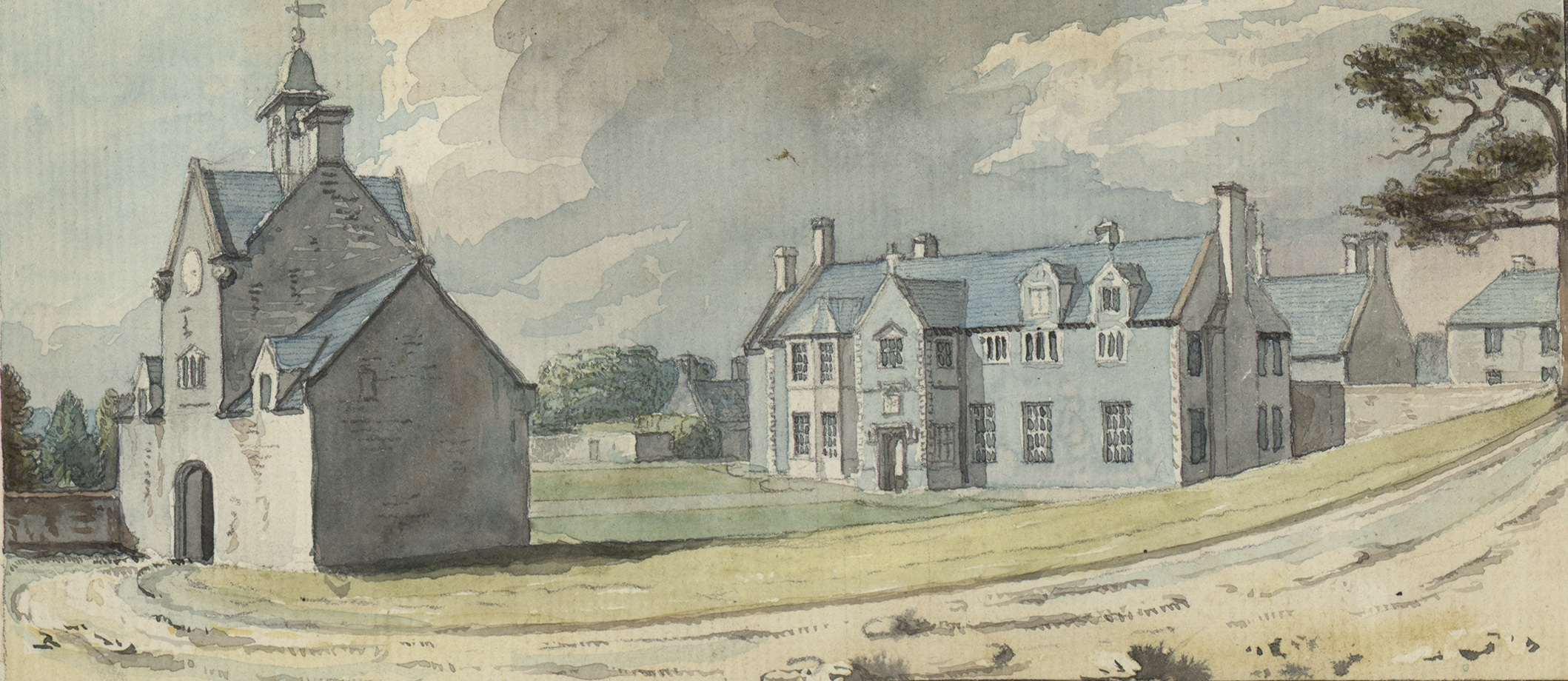
Drawing with gate house, before left extension

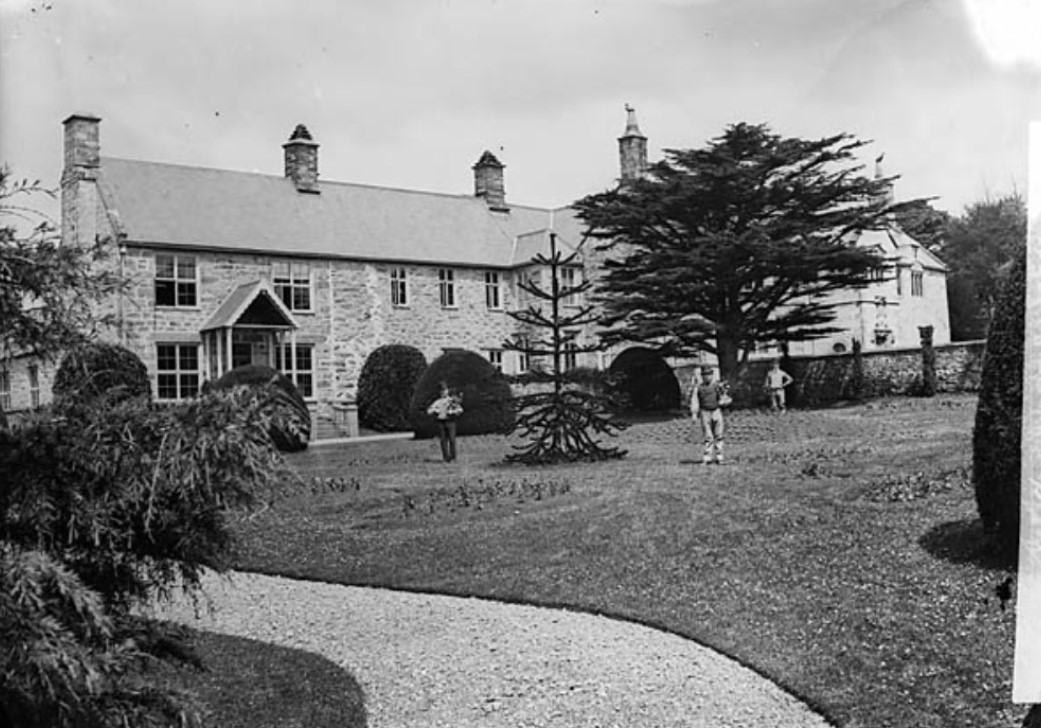
Corsygedol, left side frontage of the house

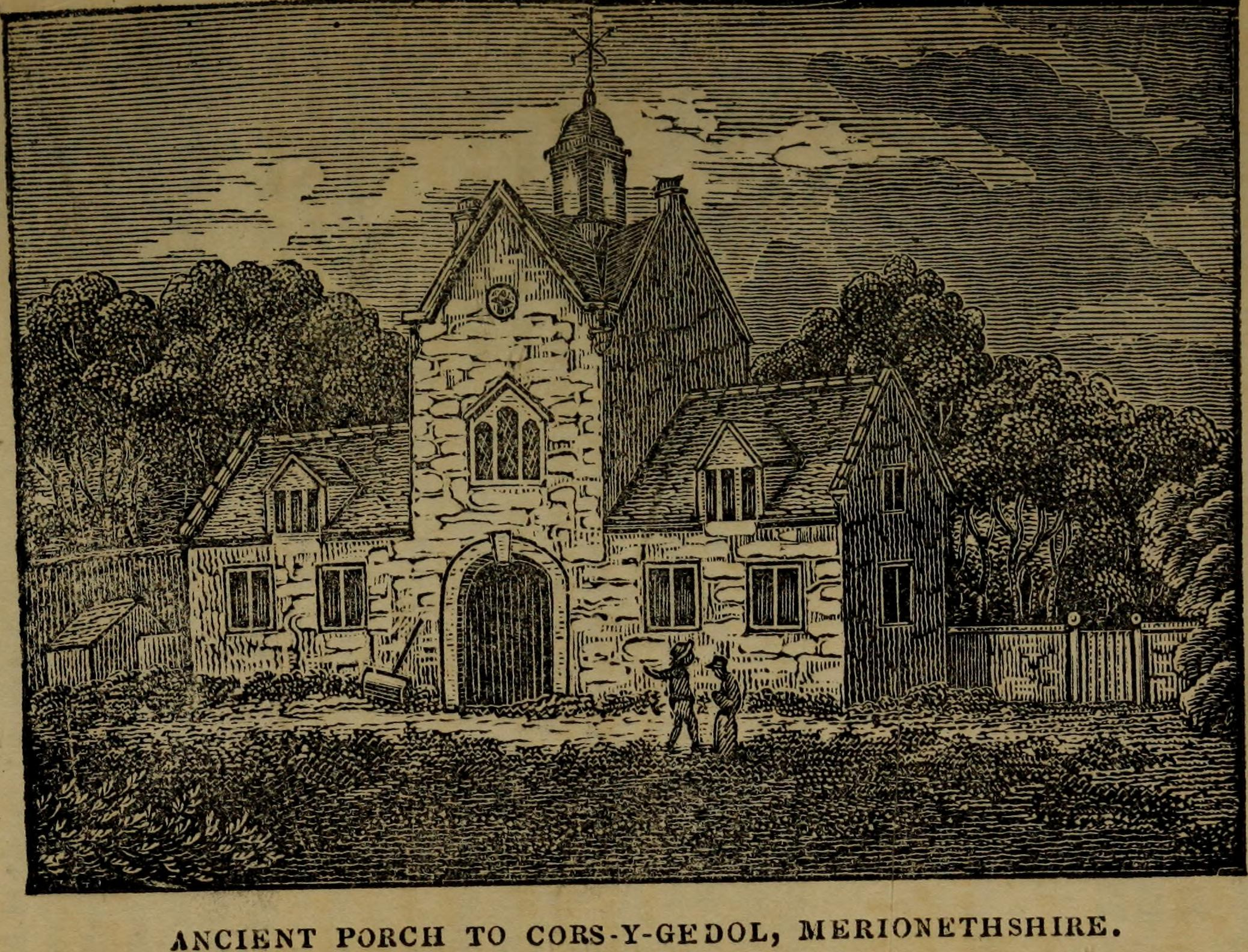
The gate house

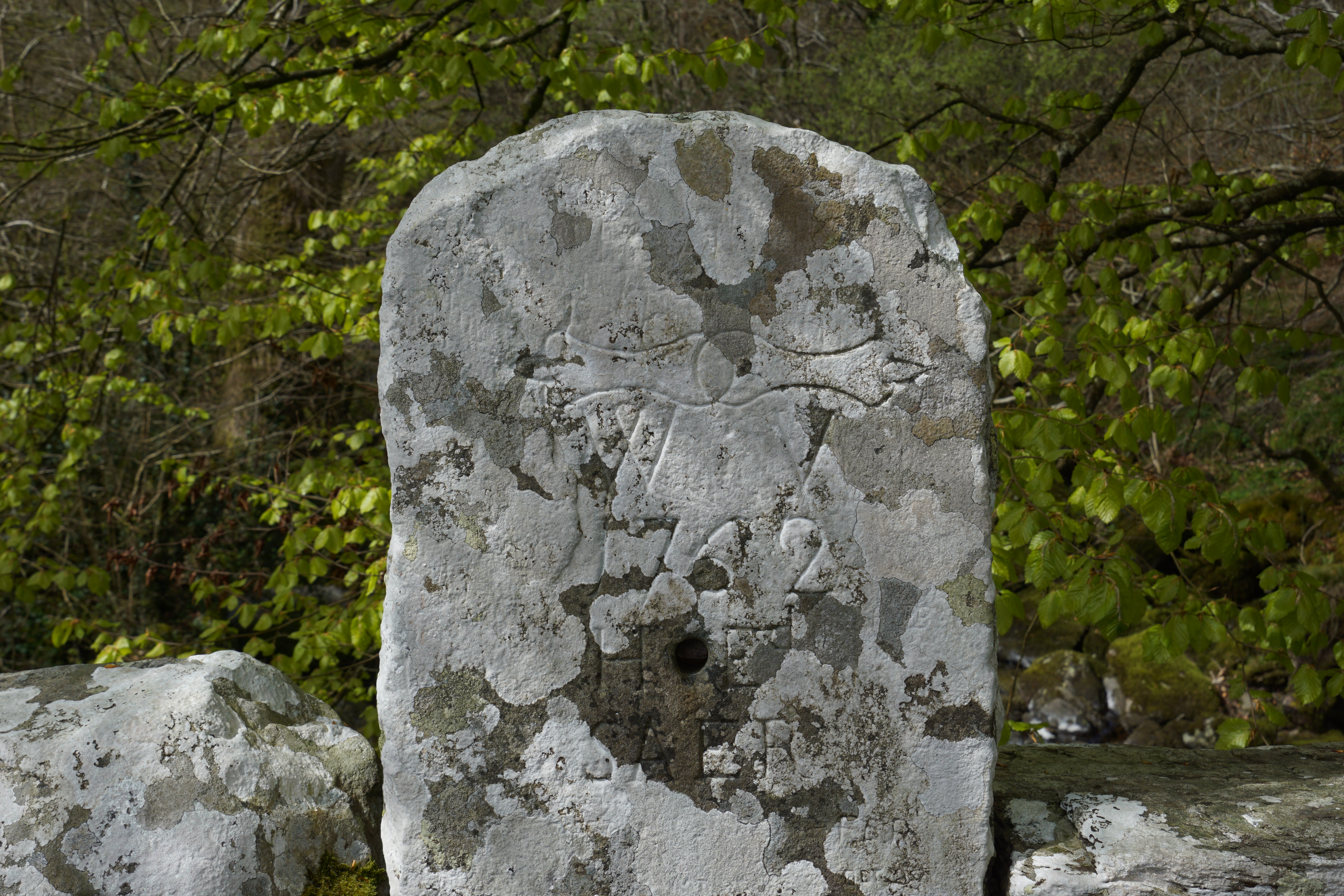
Tomb of the Vaughans

== Sources ==
- Meyrick, S. R., ed. (1846). Heraldic Visitations of Wales and Part of the Marches; between the years 1586 and 1613, under the authority of Clarencieux and Norroy, two Kings at Arms, by Lewis Dwnn, Deputy Herald at Arms. Vol. 2. Llandovery: Society for the Publication of Ancient Welsh Manuscripts. p. 71.
- Archaeologia Cambrensis, Cambrian Archaeological Association. 3. Vol. 9. W. Pickering. 1863. p. 67.
- Archaeologia Cambrensis, Cambrian Archaeological Association. 4. Vol. 6. 1846. p. 132.
- Archaeologia Cambrensis, Cambrian Archaeological Association. 5. Vol. 2. 1885. p. 2.
- Archaeologia Cambrensisa record of the antiquities of Wales and its Marches and the journal of the Cambrian Archaeological Association. 5. Vol. 3. 1846. pp. 288, 303.
- Archaeologia Cambrensis, Index to 'Archaeologia Cambrensis', 1901-1960. Vol. 8. Cambrian Archaeological Association. 1846. p. 405. ISBN 978-0-9500251-9-3.
- Breese, Edward, ed. (5 November 1873). Kalendars of Gwynedd; or, Chronological lists of lords-lieutenant, custodes rotulorum, sheriffs, and knights of the shire, for the counties of Anglesey, Caernarvon, and Merioneth. Compiled by E. Breese. With notes by William Watkin Edward Wynne. Cardiff & Merthyr Tydfil : The Educational Publishing Company, Ltd.
- Williams, Robert, ed. (1908). A Biographical Dictionary of Eminent Welshmen: From the Earliest Times to the Present, and Including Every Name Connected with the Ancient History of Wales. Llandovery: Cardiff & Merthyr Tydfil : The Educational Publishing Company, Ltd.
- Llwyn Estates, ed. (1 November 2016). Nannau - A Rich Tapestry of Welsh History.
- Archaeologia Cambrensis, 3rd ser. iv, 315, ix. 66-9

Attribution

This article incorporates text from a publication now in the public domain: "Osborn Wyddel". Dictionary of National Biography. London: Smith, Elder & Co. 1885–1900.
