= Fitzgibbon (disambiguation) =

Fitzgibbon is an Irish surname of Anglo-Norman origin.

Fitzgibbon may also refer to:

- Fitzgibbon, Queensland, a suburb of Brisbane
- Fitzgibbon Cup, a trophy for a hurling championship among higher education institutions in Ireland, named after Edwin Fitzgibbon
  - 2015 Fitzgibbon Cup
  - 2016 Fitzgibbon Cup
- Fitzgibbon Hospital

== See also ==
- Gibbons (surname)
