= Gibbon (surname) =

Gibbon is an English, Irish and Scottish surname with Norman roots.

As an English surname it is derived from the Old French name Giboin or Gibon (ultimately from ancient Germanic Gebawin or Gibo, respectively). Alternatively, it may also come from the name Gibb. As an Irish and Scottish surname, it is a variant of McGibbon. Gibben, Gibbin, and Gibbons are variants of the surname.

== Notable people ==
- Ben Gibbon (born 2000), English cricketer
- Ben Ladd-Gibbon, English cricketer
- Dafydd Gibbon (born 1944), British linguist
- Edward Gibbon (1737–1794), English historian, writer, and politician
- Gary Gibbon (born 1965), English journalist
- Jill Gibbon, British artist
- John Gibbon (1827–1896), American army officer
- John Heysham Gibbon (1903–1973), American surgeon
- Joe Gibbon (1935–2019), American baseball player
- Mark Gibbon, Canadian actor
- Ray Gibbon (c. 1926–1999), Canadian politician
- Roger Gibbon (born 1944), Trinbagonian track cyclist
- William Monk Gibbon (1896–1987), Irish poet and author

== See also ==
- Gibbons, a surname
- Lewis Grassic Gibbon (1901–1935), pen name of Scottish writer James Leslie Mitchell
- Fitzgibbon, an Irish surname derived from Gibbon.
