= John FitzThomas FitzGerald =

John FitzThomas FitzGerald may refer to:

- John FitzThomas FitzGerald, 1st Earl of Kildare (c. 1250 – 1316), Irish nobleman
- John FitzThomas FitzGerald, 1st Baron Desmond (died 1261), grandson of Maurice FitzGerald, Lord of Lanstephan
