= Thomas Gibbons =

Thomas Gibbons may refer to:

- Thomas Gibbons (hymn writer) (1720–1785), London nonconformist minister and hymn writer
- Thomas Gibbons (politician) (1745–1826), American politician, planter and steamboat owner
- Tommy Gibbons (1891–1960), American heavy-weight boxer
- Thomas Gibbons (police officer) (1904–1988), American police commissioner
