= Simon Gibbons =

Simon Gibbons is Visiting Professor of Phytochemistry at the Centre for Natural Products Discovery at Liverpool John Moores University. From 2020 to 2022 he was Professor of Natural Product Chemistry and Head of the School of Pharmacy at the University of East Anglia. From 1999 to 2012, he was Lecturer, Senior Lecturer, Reader then Professor of Medicinal Phytochemistry at the University of London School of Pharmacy. From 2012 to 2019, he was Professor of Medicinal Phytochemistry and Head of Research Department of Pharmaceutical and Biological Chemistry (2012-2015).

In 2022, he received the Phytochemical Society of Europe Medal for his research in Phytochemistry. He was the 2005 recipient of the Phytochemical Society of Europe Award for Phytochemistry, the 2012 Pharmanex Prize and was a Fellow of The Prince's Foundation for Integrated Health. From 2010-2019 he was a member of the UK Home Office Advisory Council on the Misuse of Drugs (ACMD) as the Chemistry Council member and was Chairman of the ACMD's Novel Psychoactive Substances Work Group (NPSWG), which was tasked to look at the area of 'legal high' Novel Psychoactive Substances (NPS).

From 2010-2012 he was a member of the Medicines and Healthcare Regulatory products Agency (MHRA) Herbal Medicines Advisory Committee (HMAC). He was also a member of the Governing Council of the College of Medicine and from 2010 to 2016 was Vice President and President of the Phytochemical Society of Europe.

His research interests are on the isolation and structure elucidation of antiinfective natural products from plants and drugs of abuse.

He is founding Editor-in-Chief of the journal Phytochemistry Letters, and is currently Co-Editor of the book series Progress in the Chemistry of Organic Natural Products (“Zechmeister”; Springer Verlag, Vienna). He currently serves on the Editorial Boards of Phytochemistry Reviews, Phytochemical Analysis, Phytotherapy Research, Fitoterapia, Pharmaceutica Scientia and Chinese Journal of Natural Medicine.
