= Judge Gibbons =

Judge Gibbons may refer to:

- John Joseph Gibbons (1924–2018), judge of the United States Court of Appeals for the Third Circuit
- Julia Smith Gibbons (born 1950), judge of the United States Court of Appeals for the Sixth Circuit
- Michael P. Gibbons (fl. 1980s–2020s), judge of the Nevada Court of Appeals

== See also ==
- Justice Gibbons (disambiguation)
