= MacGibbon =

MacGibbon is a surname. Notable people with the surname include:

- Brenda MacGibbon, Canadian mathematician, statistician, and decision scientist
- Charlotte MacGibbon (born 1924), Australian javelin thrower
- David MacGibbon (born 1934), Australian politician
- David MacGibbon (1831–1902), Scottish architect
- Harriet E. MacGibbon (1905–1987), American actor
- Tony MacGibbon (1924–2010), New Zealand cricketer

== See also ==
- McGibbon
