= Robert Gibbons =

Robert Gibbons may refer to:

- Robert Gibbons (politician) (1811–1898), Ontario political figure
- Robert Faucett Gibbons (1915–1995), American writer
- Robert Gibbons (economist) (born 1958), American economist
- Robert Gibbons (poet) (born 1946), American poet
- Robert D. Gibbons, professor of statistics
- Robert Gibbons, murder victim in the Ashland tragedy
- Bob Gibbons (born 1939), basketball talent scout
