= Robert Faucett Gibbons =

Robert Faucett Gibbons (1915–1995) was a U.S. writer of short stories and novels noted for their depictions of the American south.
