= John Bowler Fitzgibbons =

- Born: John Bowler Fitzgibbons
- Education: Harvard University
- Occupations: Founder and Chairman of Basin Holdings; Founder and Chairman of Talus Group Holdings; Co-Founder and Partner of Deerpath Capital

John Bowler Fitzgibbons is the founder and chairman of Basin Holdings, comprising a group of controlled, privately held companies active in energy and industrial manufacturing. He is also the founder and chairman of Talus Group Holdings, comprising a group of controlled, privately held companies active in a broad range of markets and geographies.

== Education ==
Fitzgibbons attended Harvard University, graduating cum laude with a B.A. in government.

== Career ==
Fitzgibbons founded, managed, and sold several businesses in the Russian energy market, including Khanty Mansiysk Oil Corporation (KMOC), which sold to Marathon Oil Corporation in 2003, and Integra Group, which was taken public on the London Stock Exchange in 2007.

In 2007, Fitzgibbons co-founded Deerpath Capital, a fund management group focused on direct lending in the US middle market, where he is currently a partner.

In 2010, Fitzgibbons founded Basin Holdings and in 2012, he founded Talus Group Holdings.

== Philanthropy ==
Fitzgibbons currently serves on the board of trustees at Milton Academy. He is also a member of the Council on Foreign Relations. Fitzgibbons formerly served as chairman of The SUNY Research Foundation and co-chairman of the Cancer Research Institute.
