= John Fitzgibbon =

John Fitzgibbon or FitzGibbon may refer to:

- John FitzGibbon (Irish lawyer) (c.1708–1780), Irish lawyer and politician
- John FitzGibbon, 1st Earl of Clare (1748–1802), Attorney-General and Lord Chancellor of Ireland
- John FitzGibbon, 2nd Earl of Clare (1792–1851), Privy Councillor and Governor of Bombay
- John Fitzgibbon (politician) (1845–1919), United Kingdom Member of Parliament for South Mayo (1910–1918)
- John Fitzgibbon (Cork hurler) (born 1967), Irish hurler
- John Fitzgibbon (Limerick hurler) (born 1992), Irish hurler

== See also ==
- John Fitzgibbons (1868–1941), U.S. Representative from New York
