= McGibbon =

McGibbon is a surname of Scottish and Irish origin. It is an Anglicized form of Gaelic Mac Giobúin, a patronymic from a pet form of the personal name Gilbert. People with this surname include:

- Adam McGibbon, Northern Irish environmentalist and writer
- Andrew McGibbon (born 1961), a.k.a. Andrew Paresi; English comedian, actor, writer, musician and composer (son of James McGibbon, Scottish Catholic educationalist and man of letters)
- Charlie McGibbon (1880–1954), Arsenal and Southampton footballer (father of Doug McGibbon)
- Doug McGibbon (1919–2002), Southampton, Fulham and Bournemouth footballer
- Ian McGibbon (born 1947), New Zealand military historian
- Josann McGibbon, screenwriter
- Lewis McGibbon, English cricketer
- Pat McGibbon (born 1973), a former Northern Ireland international footballer
- Pauline Mills McGibbon (1910–2001), the 22nd Lieutenant-Governor of Ontario
- Sheila McGibbon (1921–1997), an Irish stage, radio and television actress
- William McGibbon (1690–1756), a Scottish composer and violinist

== See also ==
- MacGibbon
- Gibbs
