= Steve Gibbons =

Steve Gibbons may refer to:

- Steve Gibbons (musician) (born 1941), English singer, songwriter and musician
- Steve Gibbons (politician) (1949–2022), Australian politician
- Steve Gibbons (designer) (born 1956), British graphic designer
- Stevie Gibbons (born 1983), Irish rugby league footballer
- Steve Gibbons, American actor appeared in Tromeo and Juliet
