= Gerald Fitzgibbon (disambiguation) =

Gerald Fitzgibbon (1866–1942) was an Irish judge.

Gerald Fitzgibbon may also refer to:

- Gerald Fitzgibbon (author) (1793–1882), Irish lawyer and author, grandfather of the previous
- Gerald FitzGibbon (judge, born 1837) (1837–1909), Solicitor-General for Ireland from 1877 to 1878 and Lord Justice of Appeal, respectively father and son of the two previous.
