= Edmund FitzGibbon =

Irish nobleman (1552-1608)

Edmund Fitzgibbon, 11th White Knight (c. 1552 – 23 April 1608), was an Irish nobleman of the FitzGerald dynasty, who held a Hiberno-Norman hereditary knighthood. His loyalty to Elizabeth I resulted in the capture of his kinsman, the self-declared 16th Earl of Desmond, James FitzThomas FitzGerald.

== Loss of ancestral lands ==
Fitzgibbon was the son of John Óg Fitzgerald (alias Fitzgibbon) and Ellen Condon. His father was attainted by statute of the Irish parliament in 1571, and much of Fitzgibbon's subsequent conduct stemmed from his desire to recover the family properties in the province of Munster. Following the first of the Desmond Rebellions, he accompanied the rebel James Fitzmaurice Fitzgerald to France in March 1575 and returned to Ireland in July. In the following year he leased a large portion of the ancestral lands that had fallen to the crown; these he surrendered in 1579 in return for a fresh lease, which included those same lands as well as lands that had reverted to the crown on his mother's death.

== Tudor loyalty ==
In later years, the government councillor, Sir Henry Wallop, voiced his resentment at the denial of these lands to the Plantation of Munster, which was established after the Second Desmond Rebellion and the attainder of Gerald Fitzgerald, 15th Earl of Desmond. Fitzgibbon was regularly traduced by government officials, and his hereditary enemy Lord Roche accused him of complicity in the late rebellion. He found himself under pressure to display unquestioning loyalty to a crown that was unpopular amongst his followers, and he struggled in these trying circumstances.

In 1584, he accompanied the lord deputy, Sir John Perrot, on the government's campaign in Ulster against Sorley Boy MacDonnell, and was commended for his valour after receiving a wound. In April 1587, after Perrot's departure for England, Fitzgibbon was arrested by the government; the advice of Sir Anthony St Leger, to make him, "shorter by the length of his head" was not taken, and in 1589 he was released on heavy recognizances. On balance, he showed some skill in maintaining his loyalty over a long period and, during a visit to England in 1590, he won a grant-entail-male of the ancestral lands.

In 1596 Fitzgibbon was appointed sheriff of County Cork, in which office he fulfilled his duties satisfactorily. There were suspicions of his complicity with the rebel Hugh O'Neill, during the Nine Years war (1595-1603: see Essex in Ireland), but he submitted unconditionally to Sir George Thornton in May 1600 and blamed his folly on his son John, who had joined the crown's enemies. The queen's secretary, Sir Robert Cecil, advised the President of Munster, Sir George Carew to take good pledges of Fitzgibbon, "for, it is said, you will be cozened by him at last". During this period he is said to have virtually obliterated the cathedral at Lismore. Doubts about his loyalty were raised at the highest point of the war, when he failed to capture the Súgan Earl of Desmond, James FitzThomas FitzGerald, as the rebel nobleman passed through Fitzgibbon's territory in May 1601, but Carew was happy enough with his conduct after that. He did at last manage to capture the Súgan Earl of Desmond in caves near Mitchelstown, and in reward Elizabeth I carried out the full restoration, by an act of parliament, of his lands and lineage.

== Stuart loyalty ==
Matters did not become easy for Fitzgibbon. In 1606, he was committed to gaol on suspicion of disloyalty but was released upon his promise to do service against the rebels. King James I made him Baron of Clangibbon, but he died at Castletown, County Limerick on 23 April 1608, without statutory confirmation of his lands and titles. It was the day after the death of his son Maurice, and they were buried together after lying a week in the church of Kilbeny in Kilmallock.

== Legacy ==
Fitzgibbon first married Joan Tobyn, daughter of the Lord of Cumshionagh in County Tipperary, by whom he had two sons and four daughters; he next married Joan, daughter of Lord Muskerry, by whom he had two sons, who died young. He was succeeded in his estates by a grandson, Maurice. FitzGibbon's daughter Eleanor married Finghin MacCarthy Reagh, eldest son of Owen MacCarthy Reagh, 12th Prince of Carbery.
