= Herbert Gibbons =

English cricketer

Personal information
- Full name: Herbert Gladstone Coe Gibbons
- Born: 12 March 1905; Tilehurst, Berkshire, England
- Died: 13 January 1963 (aged 57); Southampton, Hampshire, England
- Batting: Right-handed
- Bowling: Leg break googly

Domestic team information
- Years: Team
- 1925–1928: Hampshire

Career statistics
Competition	First-class
Matches	7
Runs scored	70
Batting average	10.00
100s/50s	–/–
Top score	27
Balls bowled	96
Wickets	0
Bowling average	–
5 wickets in innings	–
10 wickets in match	–
Best bowling	–
Catches/stumpings	1/–
- Source: Cricinfo, 20 January 2010

Herbert Gladstone Coe Gibbons (12 March 1905 – 13 January 1963) was an English first-class cricketer.

Gibbons was born at Tilehurst in March 1905. He made his debut in first-class cricket for Hampshire against Warwickshire at Edgbaston in the 1925 County Championship. He played irregularly for Hampshire until 1928, making a further six appearances. He scored 70 runs in his seven matches with a highest score of 27, while with his leg break googly bowling he went wicketless, having bowled a total of sixteen overs. Gibbons had been a detective constable with the Southampton City Police since the early 1930s, with him continuing to serve as a police officer in the Second World War, during which he partook in exhibition matches for the police. Gibbons died at Southampton in January 1963.
