= Justice Gibbons =

Justice Gibbons may refer to:

- Lyman Gibbons (1808–1879), associate justice of the Alabama Supreme Court, United States
- Mark Gibbons (born 1950), associate justice of the Supreme Court of Nevada, United States

== See also ==
- Judge Gibbons (disambiguation)
