= Jim Gibbons =

Jim Gibbons may refer to:

- Jim Gibbons (American politician) (born 1944), Republican governor of Nevada
- Jim Gibbons (Irish politician) (1924–1997), Irish Fianna Fáil politician and government minister
  - His son Jim Gibbons Jnr (born 1954), former Irish Progressive Democrats Senator
- Jim Gibbons (American football) (1936–2016), American football player
- Jim Gibbons (businessman), former CEO of Goodwill Industries
- Jim Gibbons (sportscaster), American sportscaster

== See also ==
- James Gibbons (disambiguation)
