= White Knight (Fitzgibbon family) =

Medieval Irish noble title

The White Knight
- Ermine a saltire gules on a chief argent, three annulets of the second.
- Creation date: 19 July 1333
- Created by: Edward of Windsor
- Peerage: Ireland
- First holder: Maurice FitzGibbon

The White Knight is one of three Anglo-Norman hereditary knighthoods within Ireland dating from the medieval period. The title was first conferred upon Maurice Fitzgibbon in the early 14th century. The other two knighthoods, both in the Fitzgerald family, are the Knight of Glin (also called the Black Knight), which has become dormant after 700 years (since the death of the 29th Knight, September 2011), and the Knight of Kerry (also called the Green Knight), which is held by Adrian FitzGerald, 6th Baronet, 24th Knight of Kerry.

== History ==
The first White Knight was Maurice FitzGibbon. He was knighted in the field by Edward III in 1333, immediately after the defeat of Scottish forces at the Battle of Halidon Hill. Maurice FitzGibbon, 1st White Knight was the son of Gilbert Fitz John, eldest illegitimate son of John FitzGerald, 1st Baron Desmond and Honora, daughter of Hugh O'Connor Don aka Ó Conchubhair Donn of Kerry, King of Connacht aka Felim Ua Conchobair. John FitzGerald was also the ancestor of the Earls of Desmond. The family of the White Knight was esteemed as the second branch of the House of FitzGerald, of which the Earl of Desmond was the head.

The following passage discusses a traditional, folk origin of the House of FitzGerald: "The Fitz Geralds of Ireland, men of approued [sic] valour, were without question / descended from the auncient Trojans, when, that famous citty of Pergamus / beeing vtterly layd waste after ten yeares seidge, all her Princes slayne / in battailes, Prince Aeneas only surviueing; who beeing the close concealement / of Poliscena, Priam’s most beautiful daughter, was banished by the / Greekes, and followed by a gallant and warlike crewe of martiall youths, / who surviued theyre natiue countryes destruction. The Auncestors of Fitz Geralds / were of them who followed him in his exile."

From a fragment of Irish poetry attributed to the Irish poet Donogh McCraith, translated into English: "Three renowned knights of Gerald’s powerfull [sic] race / In Ireland (well ’twas known), being stoutest had the place; / To distinguish each of these Gallants progenye, / By right of birth and worth, the White Knight bore the sway".

The title of the White Knight, in the original Irish, can be anglicized as: "Ryther-a-fin". The White Knight possessed large estates in the counties of Limerick and Cork. Though it was common in the historical context of early medieval Ireland for one possessing Knight's Fees to take his name from the lands that he held by military service, the White Knight was not called after his land, but is supposed to have taken his distinct appellation from the colour of his armour. Maurice Fitzgibbon, 1st White Knight, led military expeditions alongside the Earl of Desmond in Scotland and Wales, serving as Lieutenant-General to the Earl of Desmond.

The White Knights were constantly at war with the Lords Roche, their near neighbours. Whenever the followers or retainers of the two families met, except in alliance against a common foe, "there was sure to be a bloody encounter between them." One such encounter, between Edmund Fitzgibbon, 11th White Knight, and a bastard son of David Roche, Viscount Roche and Fermoy, is recorded. Roche, attempting to intimidate FitzGibbon into relinquishing claims on the lands of Old Castletown in county Cork, led an incursion into the lands of FitzGibbon, "where he began to plunder all before him". As Roche proceeded back toward his own lands, he was intercepted by FitzGibbon. Their encounter is recorded in the following passage: "At last the Whyte Knight [sic] and Roche fell hand to hand on horseback and fought together, till both theyre staves or horse mobpykes were broaken to shivers. Then they both alighted and fought with theyre swords a good while with equal fortune. At last Roche received a stroake on the knee (for he was armed upwards and ye Whyte Knight had noe armor on him), and Roches men being killed or fledd, one of the Whyte Knight's souldiers came and shott him in ye face with a pocket pistol loaden with small shott, whereupon he fled, and (as it is sayd) would have gone neere to have escaped had it not bin for his bootes, when one Gibbon Roe followed him, being on horseback, and rann him through under the arme pitt, and soe made an end of Stout Roche."

== Holders of the title ==
The title passed from father to son for nearly three hundred years.

- Maurice Fitzgibbon, 1st White Knight (d. 1357)
- David Fitzgibbon, 2nd White Knight
- John Fitzgibbon, 3rd White Knight
- Maurice Fitzgibbon, 4th White Knight (d. 1419)
- John Fitzgibbon, 5th White Knight
- Maurice Mor Fitzgibbon, 6th White Knight(d. 1496)
- Maurice Oge Fitzgibbon, 7th White Knight(d. 1530)
- Maurice Fitzgibbon, 8th White Knight (d. 1543)
- John Fitzgibbon, 9th White Knight (d. 1569)
- John Oge Fitzgibbon, 10th White Knight (d. 1569)
- Edmund Fitzgibbon, 11th White Knight (d. 1608)
- Maurice Oge Fitzgibbon, 12th White Knight (d. 1611) — no children.

After the death of Edmund Fitzgibbon, 11th White Knight, his land holdings were transmitted to his daughter, Margery, contrary to the "usual rules of descent of Knight's Fees in Ireland, which would have given it to David Fitzgibbon, of Kilmore, commonly called ne Carrig, (i.e., David of the Rock.)." This was allowed due to a special arrangement made by Edmund Fitzgibbon with the English government, "as one of the conditions of his betraying the Earl of Desmond". If the estate of Edmund Fitzgibbon had been allowed to pass to David ne Carrig, it would have been confiscated by the English government as a consequence of David ne Carrig's support of the 16th Earl of Desmond in his rebellion against the English. The son of Edmund Fitzgibbon, called Maurice, died the day before his father, in 1608. The title of the White Knight was therefore passed to Maurice's son, who was Edmund's grandson. This was Maurice Oge Fitzgibbon, 12th White Knight, and although he inherited Edmund's ancient title, Edmund's lands passed to Margaret, Edmund's daughter.

A claim to the title of The White Knight was asserted by Lord Kingston in 1821, who was a descendant by marriage of Margaret (1602–1666), the granddaughter of Edmond Fitzgibbon, 11th White Knight, but was successfully contested and refused by the crown.

The last recorded holder of the title of the White Knight was Maurice Fitzgibbon of Crohana, Kilkenny, who assumed the title in 1858. Though the 'Kilkenny' branch of the family has since become extinct, the 'Limerick' branch remains extant. The Fitzgibbons of Limerick represent the last remaining branch of the Fitzgibbon lineage. The Fitzgibbons of Limerick held the title Earls of Clare (see: John FitzGibbon, 1st Earl of Clare) from 1794 until 1864.

== See also ==
- FitzGerald dynasty
