= Gibbons (automobile) =

Overview
- Manufacturer: Gibbons and Moore
- Production: 1917-1929
- Designer: E.R. Gibbons

Body and chassis
- Class: cyclecar
- Body style: two or four seat open

Powertrain
- Engine: 550 to 1100 cc single- or twin-cylinder
- Transmission: belt or 3-speed gearbox

Chronology
- Successor: none

The Gibbons was a British 4 wheeled cyclecar made from 1917 to 1929 by engineering pattern makers Gibbons and Moore of Chadwell Heath, Essex. The first car was made in 1914 but production did not start until 1917. By 1920 the car was described as the MkIII.

The car was unusual in having the air-cooled engine mounted outside the body on the front right hand side The first cars had a basic 2 seater body with the seats side by side and 4 hp single-cylinder, four-stroke JAP engine. Subsequent cars had a variety of engines, some with two cylinders. The engine drove a countershaft mounted across the car. From this two forward gears were provided by belts to either of the rear wheels with ratios selected by clutches on different diameter pulleys on either end of the countershaft. Braking was by blocks bearing on the drive pulleys.

The bodywork was made of plywood and as well as side by side, tandem seating was also available on a version advertised as the Sport model with room for an adult and child in the rear.

A Mk IV version was also advertised and claimed to be lighter than the MkIII. It had no doors and was powered by a two-stroke engine.

The car could also for a while be bought in kit form with a set of plans being advertised For 5 shillings with machined or un-machined parts available.

A four-seater model, the 10/25 with V twin Blackburne engine was advertised in 1925. Chain drive replaced belts on this model and there was a Sturmey Archer three-speed gearbox with reverse. Drum brakes were fitted on the rear wheels. Lighting remained by acetylene, with headlights extra, but a full length hood and a rear windscreen were provided for weather protection

Production numbers are not known exactly but period advertisements referred to more than 1000 made. Most production was between 1921 and 1926 but the car was still advertised in 1929; by then it was being made "to special order".

Only one car is known to survive.

== See also ==
- List of car manufacturers of the United Kingdom
