= 2016 Fitzgibbon Cup =

Irish collegiate hurling tournament

Tournament details
- Year: 2016
- Trophy: Fitzgibbon Cup
- Sponsor: independent.ie

Winners
- Champions: Mary I Limerick (1st win)
- Manager: Eamonn Cregan
- Captain: Darragh Corry & Richie English

Runners-up
- Runners-up: UL
- Manager: Brian Lohan
- Captain: Jack Browne

The 2016 independent.ie Fitzgibbon Cup was the 100th staging of the Fitzgibbon Cup since its establishment in 1912. The semi-finals and final were hosted by Cork IT on 26 and 27 February 2016 where Mary Immaculate College won their first ever title.

== Format ==
Group stage

Fifteen institutes of higher education compete in three groups of four and one group of three. Each team in a group plays all the other teams in the group once. Two points are awarded for a win and one for a draw.

Knockout stage

The four group winners play the four group runners-up in the quarter-finals. The semi-finals and final are played over a single weekend, usually the last Friday and Saturday in February.

== Group stage ==
=== Group A ===
Pos	Team	Pld	W	D	L	SF	SA	Diff	Pts
1	Limerick IT	3	3	0	0	6-49	2-38	23	6
2	UCD	3	2	0	1	4-39	0-41	10	4
3	UCC	3	1	0	2	5-45	4-37	11	2
4	Maynooth University	3	0	0	3	0-30	9-47	-44	0

28 January 2016; 14:45; Round 1	UCD	2-12 - 0-13	UCC	The Mardyke
28 January 2016; 14:45; Round 1	Oisín O'Rorke (1-7, 0-7 frees); Colm Cronin (1-0); Ross King, James Maher (0-2); Cian O'Callaghan (0-1)	Report	Alan Cadogan (0-5); Rob O'Shea (0-4, 0-3 frees); Michael Breen (0-2); DJ Foran, John Power (0-1)	The Mardyke

28 January 2016; 19:00; Round 1	Limerick IT	4-16 - 0-10	Maynooth University	Maynooth University; Referee: James Owens
28 January 2016; 19:00; Round 1	Peter Duggan (1-6 frees); Niall Maher (1-3); David Reidy, Paul Killeen (1-0); Diarmaid Byrnes, M O'Malley, S Gleeson (0-2); O O'Brien (0-1)	Report	Brian Molloy (0-8, 0-6 frees); Ross Donohue, P Winters (0-1)	Maynooth University; Referee: James Owens

4 February 2016; 14:00; Round 2	Limerick IT	0-18 - 1-14	UCD	Limerick IT
4 February 2016; 14:00; Round 2	David Reidy (0-6, 0-5 frees); Diarmuid Byrnes (0-6, 0-2 frees, 0-1 '65); Joe Campion (0-3); Michael O'Malley, Peter Duggan, Shane Gleeson (0-1)	Report	James Maher (1-1); Oisín O'Rourke (0-4, 0-3 frees); Seán Moran (0-3); Conor O'Shea (0-2, 0-1 frees); Cian O'Callagan, Eoin Conroy, Ross King, Tomas O'Leary (0-1)	Limerick IT

4 February 2016; 16:00; Round 2	UCC	4-18 - 0-10	Maynooth University	Maynooth
4 February 2016; 16:00; Round 2	Rob O'Shea (1-9, 0-6 frees, 0-2 '65s); Alan Cadogan (1-6); Tom Devine (1-1); Shane O'Donnell (1-0); Jamie Barron, Niall McCarthy (0-1)	Report	Brian Molloy (0-4, 0-3 frees); Paul Winters (0-3, 0-1 free); Paul Kinsella (0-2 frees); Niall Kenny (0-1)	Maynooth

9 February 2016; 14:30; Round 3	Limerick IT	2-15 - 1-14	UCC	The Mardyke; Referee: Fergal Horgan
9 February 2016; 14:30; Round 3	Peter Duggan (1-4, 0-2 frees); David Dempsey (1-2); Diarmuid Byrnes (0-3 frees); Michael O'Malley, Alan Dempsey (0-2); Cathal Barrett (0-1); David Reidy (0-1 free)	Report	Rob O'Shea (0-7 frees); Alan Cadogan (1-0), Cormac Murphy, Barry Lawton (0-2); Niall McCarthy, John Power, Tom Devine (0-1)	The Mardyke; Referee: Fergal Horgan

9 February 2016; 19:00; Round 3	UCD	1-13 - 0-10	Maynooth University	Belfield; Referee: Alan Kelly
9 February 2016; 19:00; Round 3	James Maher (0-4); Oisín O'Rorke (0-4 frees); Ciaran Prendergast (1-0); Padraic Guinan (0-2); Sean Moran (0-1 free); Eoin Conroy, Jack O'Connor (0-1)	Report	Paul Winters (0-8, 0-6 frees); David Burke, Niall Kenny (0-1)	Belfield; Referee: Alan Kelly

=== Group B ===
Pos	Team	Pld	W	D	L	SF	SA	Diff	Pts
1	IT Carlow	3	3	0	0	6-46	4-27	25	6
2	WIT	3	2	0	1	4-46	2-29	23	4
3	St. Pat's, Drumcondra	3	0	1	2	3-43	7-53	-22	1
4	DCU	3	0	1	2	4-37	4-63	-26	1

28 January 2016; 14:00; Round 1	WIT	1-19 - 0-9	St. Pat's, Drumcondra	St. Pat's, Drumcondra; Referee: Christy Browne
28 January 2016; 14:00; Round 1	Austin Gleeson (0-5, 0-2 frees); Liam McGrath (0-8, 0-3 frees, 0-1 '65); Johnny Hayes (1-0); Stephen Roche, Eoin McGrath, Jack Langton, Mark Lynch, Craig Guiry, Ciaran O'Brien (0-1)	Report	Patrick Curran (0-6 frees); Eoin Price (0-2); Jack McGrath (0-1)	St. Pat's, Drumcondra; Referee: Christy Browne

28 January 2016; 19:00; Round 1	IT Carlow	1-21 - 1-8	DCU	Carlow; Referee: James McGrath
28 January 2016; 19:00; Round 1	Stephen Maher (0-9, 0-6 frees); Colin Dunford (1-2, 0-1 free); Charles Dwyer (0-3, 0-1 free); Jack Fagan, Chris Bolger (0-2); Kevin Kelly, Michael Harney, James Doyle (0-1)	Report	Cathal Curran (0-3, 0-2 frees); Peter Hogan (1-0); Paudie Foley (0-1 free); Eoghan O'Donnell, Dan Staunton, Danny Sutcliffe, Sean Gray (0-1)	Carlow; Referee: James McGrath

3 February 2016; 14:00; Round 2	IT Carlow	4-17 - 2-14	St. Pat's, Drumcondra	Drumcondra; Referee: Brendan Brady
3 February 2016; 14:00; Round 2	Stephen Maher; (0-11, 0-5 frees); Chris Bolger (2-0); Colin Dunford (1-1); Tom Nolan (1-0); Charles Dwyer (0-3); Jack Fagan (0-2)	Report	Patrick Curran (1-10, 0-6 frees); Eoin McIntyre (1-1); Jack McGrath (0-1 free); P Breathnach, T Devlin (0-1)	Drumcondra; Referee: Brendan Brady

4 February 2016; 19:00; Round 2	WIT	2-22 - 1-12	DCU	Carriganore
4 February 2016; 19:00; Round 2	Liam McGrath 0-10 (6fs), Johnny Hayes 1-2, Austin Gleeson 0-4, Jack Langton 1-0, Ciaran O'Brien, Owen McGrath 0-2 each, Stephen Roche, Mark Lynch 0-1 each	Report	Cathal Curran (1-1, 1-0 penalty); Killian Fitzgerald (0-3); Danny Sutcliffe (0-3, 0-2 frees); Dan Staunton, Peter Hogan, C Joyce, D Barden, N O'Connor (0-1)	Carriganore

9 February 2016; 19:00; Round 3	DCU	2-17 - 1-20	St. Pat's, Drumcondra	DCU; Referee: James McGrath
9 February 2016; 19:00; Round 3	P Hogan (1-3); G Howard (1-2); D Sutcliffe (0-3, 0-2 frees); C Joyce (0-3, 0-2 frees), C Curran, S Gray (0-2); D Staunton, M Heaney (0-1)	Report	P Curran (0-10, 0-5 frees); T Devlin (0-3); C Breatnach (1-0); J McGrath (0-2, 0-1 free); J de Barun, W Murphy, M Collins, E Price, J Bruton	DCU; Referee: James McGrath

9 February 2016; 19:00; Round 3	IT Carlow	1-8 - 1-5	WIT	Carlow; Referee: Brian Gavin
9 February 2016; 19:00; Round 3	Stephen Maher (0-6, 0-5 frees); James Doyle (1-0); Kevin Kelly (0-1); Enda Rowland (0-1 free)	Report	Owen McGrath 1-0; T Fox (0-2 frees); Austin Gleeson (0-2 frees); Stephen Roche (0-1 free)	Carlow; Referee: Brian Gavin

=== Group C ===
Pos	Team	Pld	W	D	L	SF	SA	Diff	Pts
1	Mary I Limerick	3	2	0	1	5-49	5-33	16	4
2	UL	3	2	0	1	5-50	3-44	12	4
3	NUI Galway	3	2	0	1	3-47	3-38	9	4
4	DIT	3	0	0	3	2-26	4-57	-37	0

28 January 2016; 14:00; Round 1	UL	0-20 - 0-14	DIT	Parnells GAA; Referee: Alan Kelly
28 January 2016; 14:00; Round 1	John McGrath (0-7 frees); Kevin O'Brien, Tommy Heffernan (0-4); Conor Martin (0-2); Jason Forde, Kevin Hehir, Barry Heffernan (0-1)	Report	Derek McNicholas (0-9, 0-3 frees, 0-1 '65, 0-1 sideline); Lee Chin (0-3); Jack Guiney (0-1 free); Conor Sheehan (0-1)	Parnells GAA; Referee: Alan Kelly

28 January 2016; 14:00; Round 1	Mary I Limerick	1-16 - 0-13	NUI Galway	Dangan; Referee: Fergal Horgan
28 January 2016; 14:00; Round 1	Declan Hannon (1-9, 0-7 frees); M O'Neill, C Lynch, D Reidy, D Corry, D O'Donovan, R Maher, C Galvin (0-1)	Report	Bobby Duggan (0-6, 0-5 frees); Niall O'Brien (0-2); Conor Whelan, Aidan Helebert, Kevin McHugo, Ger Hennelly, Michael Mullins (0-1)	Dangan; Referee: Fergal Horgan

4 February 2016; 14:00; Round 2	NUI Galway	3-18 - 2-7	DIT	Dangan
4 February 2016; 14:00; Round 2	Bobby Duggan (0-7, 0-5 frees); John Fox (2-0); Cathal Mannion (1-2); Conor Whelan (0-3); Padraig Mannion, Niall O'Brien, Oisin Donnellan (0-2)	Report	Jack Guiney, Jude Sweeney (1-0); Derek McNicholas (0-2, 0-1 penalty); Glenn Whelan (0-2); AJ Murphy, Lee Chin (0-1); Cian O'Donoghue (0-1 '65)	Dangan

4 February 2016; 14:00; Round 2	UL	5-15 - 3-14	Mary I Limerick	MICL Grounds; Referee: Fergal Horgan
4 February 2016; 14:00; Round 2	Tommy Heffernan (2-2); John McGrath (0-5, 0-2 frees, 0-1 '65); Jason Forde (1-1 frees); Cathal McInerney (0-3); Pat Ryan, Kevin O'Brien (1-0); David Fitzgerald, Tom Morrissey, Conor Martin, Kevin Hehir (0-1)	Report	Declan Hannon (2-1); Darragh O'Donovan (0-6, 0-4 frees); Sean Linnane (1-0); Colm Galvin (0-2); Conor Twomey, David Reidy, Mickey O'Neill, Tom Stapleton, Stephen Cahill (0-1)	MICL Grounds; Referee: Fergal Horgan

9 February 2016; 14:00; Round 3	Mary I Limerick	1-19 - 0-5	DIT	Parnells GAA; Referee: Mick Murtagh
9 February 2016; 14:00; Round 3	Declan Hannon (0-9, 0-6 frees); Darragh Corry (1-2); Darragh O'Donovan (0-5, 0-1 free, 0-1 '65); Cian Lynch (0-2); Stephen Cahill, Colm Galvin (0-1)	Report	Jack Guiney (0-3 frees); Conor Sheehan (0-1); Derek McNicholas (0-1)	Parnells GAA; Referee: Mick Murtagh

9 February 2016; 14:00; Round 3	NUI Galway	0-16 - 0-15	UL	St. Patrick's; Referee: Cathal McAllister
9 February 2016; 14:00; Round 3	Bobby Duggan (0-9, 0-8 frees); Niall O'Brien (0-2); Padraic Mannion (0-2); Cathal Mannion, Kevin McHugo, Oisín Donnellan (0-1)	Report	John McGrath (0-9, 0-7 frees); Tom Morrissey (0-2); Jason Forde (0-1 free); Kevin Hehir, Kevin O'Brien, David Fitzgerald (0-1)	St. Patrick's; Referee: Cathal McAllister

=== Group D ===
Pos	Team	Pld	W	D	L	SF	SA	Diff	Pts
1	CIT	2	2	0	0	4-39	0-24	27	4
2	GMIT	2	1	0	1	1-11	3-26	-21	2
3	UUJ	2	0	0	2	0-21	2-21	-6	0

28 January 2016; 19:00; Round 1	CIT	3-22 - 0-7	GMIT	CIT; Referee: Johnny Murphy
28 January 2016; 19:00; Round 1	Jamie Coughlan (1-10, 0-7 frees); John O'Dwyer (1-3); John Cashman (0-3); Bill Cooper (0-2); John Cronin, Andrew Coffey, Brendan Reddin, Noel McNamara (0-1); 1-0 own goal.	Report	Dan Nevin (0-3, 0-2 frees); Darragh Burke, Brendan Tuohey, Conor Gardiner, Jarlath Mannion (0-1)	CIT; Referee: Johnny Murphy

4 February 2016; 14:00; Round 2	CIT	1-17 - 0-17	UUJ	Jordanstown; Referee: Brian Brady
4 February 2016; 14:00; Round 2	John O'Dwyer (0-8, 0-3 frees, 0-2 '65s); Pa White (1-0); Andrew Coffey, M Kearney, John Cronin (0-2); Conor Hammersley, David Noonan, Noel McNamara (0-1); John Cashman (0-1 free)	Report	Nicky McKeague (0-5, 0-3 frees, 0-1 '65); James Connolly (1-1); S McAfee (0-2); G Walsh (0-2 frees); D McKernan, T O Ciaran, J McGreevy, J O'Connell (0-1)	Jordanstown; Referee: Brian Brady

9 February 2016; 14:00; Round 3	GMIT	1-4 - 0-4	UUJ	Carnmore GAA; Referee: Kevin McGeeney
9 February 2016; 14:00; Round 3	Darragh Burke (1-1, 0-1 free); Conor Gardiner, Brendan Tuohey, David Mangan (0-1)	Report	Nicky McKeague (0-4, 0-3 frees)	Carnmore GAA; Referee: Kevin McGeeney

== Knockout stage ==
Quarter-finals
17 February - CIT
UL	2-19
CIT	3-11
16 February - IT Carlow
UCD	1-17
IT Carlow	1-16
17 February - Limerick IT
Limerick IT	0-16
WIT	0-8
16 February - Mary I Limerick
Mary I Limerick	2-26
GMIT	0-10

Semi-finals
26 February - CIT
UL	3-14
UCD	0-16
26 February - CIT
Limerick IT	0-9
Mary I Limerick	0-11

Final
27 February - CIT
UL	1-30
Mary I Limerick	3-22

=== Quarter-finals ===
Group winners will have home advantage for the quarter-finals.

16 February 2016; 14:00; Quarter-final	Mary I Limerick	2-26 - 0-10	GMIT	Mary I Limerick; Referee: Barry Kelly
16 February 2016; 14:00; Quarter-final	Declan Hannon (1-7, 0-5 frees); David Reidy (1-2); Sean Linnane (0-4); Mickey O’Neill (0-3, 0-2 frees); Niall O'Meara (0-3); Stephen Cahill, Colm Galvin (0-2); Cian Lynch, Seamus Kennedy (0-1)	Report	Davy Conroy (0-4); Dan Nevin (0-3, 0-2 frees); Darragh Burke, Conor Gardiner, Alan Ward (0-1)	Mary I Limerick; Referee: Barry Kelly

16 February 2016; 19:00; Quarter-final	UCD	1-17 - 1-16 (AET)	IT Carlow	IT Carlow; Referee: James Owens
16 February 2016; 19:00; Quarter-final	Oisín O'Rorke (0-8, 0-6 frees, 0-1 '65); Colm Cronin (1-3); Padraic Guinan, James Maher (0-2); Conor O'Shea (0-1 free); Conor Devitt (0-1)	Report	Enda Rowland (0-5, 0-4 frees, 0-1 '65); Stephen Maher (0-5, 0-4 frees); Jack Fagan (1-0); Charles Dwyer, Mark Russell (0-2); Colin Dunford, Kevin Kelly (0-1)	IT Carlow; Referee: James Owens

17 February 2016; 14:00; Quarter-final	Limerick IT	0-16 - 0-8	WIT	Limerick IT; Referee: Cathal McAllister
17 February 2016; 14:00; Quarter-final	Peter Duggan (0-5, 0-3 frees); Diarmuid Byrnes (0-5 frees); David Dempsey (0-3); Cathal Barrett, David Reidy, Michael O'Malley (0-1)	Report	Johnny Hayes (0-2 frees); Joe Dwyer (0-2, 0-1 free); Shane McNulty (0-2); Tom Fox (0-1 free); Owen McGrath (0-1)	Limerick IT; Referee: Cathal McAllister

17 February 2016; 19:00; Quarter-final	UL	2-19 - 3-11	CIT	CIT; Referee: Johnny Ryan
17 February 2016; 19:00; Quarter-final	Kevin O’Brien (2-1); John McGrath (0-6, 0-2 frees); Tom Morrissey, Conor Martin (0-4); Brian Stapleton, Kevin Hehir, Barry Heffernan (0-1); Jason Forde (0-1 free)	Report	Jamie Coughlan (1-3, 0-3 frees); Bill Cooper, Michael Kearney (1-1); Ray Barry (0-3, 0-2 frees); Andrew Coffey (0-2); Robbie Hanley (0-1)	CIT; Referee: Johnny Ryan

=== Semi-finals ===
26 February 2016; 13:00; Semi-final	UL	3-14 - 0-16	UCD	CIT; Referee: Cathal McAllister
26 February 2016; 13:00; Semi-final	John McGrath (2-5, 0-4 frees, 0-1 '65); Tommy Heffernan (1-1); Tommy Morrissey (0-4); Jason Forde (0-3 frees); Cathal McInerney (0-1)	Report	Oisin O'Rorke (0-8, 0-7 frees, 0-1 '65); James Maher (0-3); Colm Cronin, Padraic Guinan (0-2); Eoin Conroy (0-1)	CIT; Referee: Cathal McAllister

26 February 2016; 15:00; Semi-final	Mary I Limerick	0-11 - 0-9	Limerick IT	CIT; Referee: Diarmuid Kirwan
26 February 2016; 15:00; Semi-final	Declan Hannon (0-5, 0-4 frees, 0-1 '65); Darragh O'Donovan (0-2); Ronan Maher, Colm Galvin, Niall O'Meara, David Reidy (0-1)	Report	Diarmaid Byrnes (0-4, 0-2 frees, 0-1 '65); Peter Duggan (0-2); Oisin O'Brien, Paul Killeen, Alan Dempsey (0-1)	CIT; Referee: Diarmuid Kirwan

=== Final ===
27 February 2016; 15:00; Final	Mary I Limerick	1-30 - 3-22 (AET)	UL	CIT; Referee: James Owens
27 February 2016; 15:00; Final	Declan Hannon (1-12, 0-9 frees); Cian Lynch (0-5); Sean Linnane, David Reidy (0-3); Darragh O’Donovan (0-3, 0-1 free); Tadhg Gallacher, John Meagher, Stephen Cahill, Darragh Corry (0-1)	Report	John McGrath (2-7, 0-5 frees, 0-1 '65); Tommy Heffernan (0-6); Tom Morrissey (1-1); Conor Martin, Kevin Hehir, Aidan McGuane (0-2); Jason Forde, Cathal McInerney (0-1)	CIT; Referee: James Owens
