= James Gibbons (disambiguation) =

James Gibbons (1834–1921) was an American prelate of the Catholic Church.

James Gibbons may also refer to:

- James Gibbons (footballer) (born 1998), English footballer
- James Gibbons (rugby union) (born 1993), English rugby union player
- James F. Gibbons (born 1931), American professor and academic administrator

== See also ==
- Jim Gibbons (disambiguation)
- James Gibbon (1819–1888), land speculator and politician in Queensland, Australia
