= Phytochemical Analysis =

- Discipline: Chemistry
- Language: English
- Edited by: Satyajit D. Sarker

Publication details
- History: 1991-present
- Publisher: John Wiley & Sons
- Frequency: Bimonthly
- Impact factor: 3.373 (2020)

Standard abbreviations
- ISO 4: Phytochem. Anal.

Indexing
- CODEN: PHANEL
- ISSN: 0958-0344 (print); 1099-1565 (web)
- LCCN: 91660141
- OCLC no.: 23673004

Links
- Journal homepage; Online access; Online archive

Phytochemical Analysis is a bimonthly peer-reviewed scientific journal established in 1991 and published by John Wiley & Sons. It covers research on the utilization of analytical methodology in Plant Chemistry. The current editor-in-chief is Prof Satyajit Sarker (Liverpool John Moores University) and Managing Editor is Prof Lutfun Nahar (Liverpool John Moores University).

== Abstracting and indexing ==
The journal is abstracted and indexed in:

- Chemical Abstracts Service
- Current Contents/Agriculture, Biology & Environmental Sciences
- Index Medicus/MEDLINE/PubMed
- Scopus
- Science Citation Index

According to the Journal Citation Reports, the journal has a 2020 impact factor of 3.373.

== Notable papers ==
According to the Web of Science, the following articles have been cited over 200 times:

1. Koleva, Irina I.; Van Beek, Teris A.; Linssen, Jozef P. H.; Groot, Aede de; Evstatieva, Lyuba N. (2002). "Screening of Plant Extracts for Antioxidant Activity: A Comparative Study on Three Testing Methods". Phytochemical Analysis. 13 (1): 8–17. doi:10.1002/pca.611. PMID 11899609.
2. Fang, Xin-Ping; Rieser, Matthew J.; Gu, Zhe-Ming; Zhao, Geng-Xian; McLaughlin, Jerry L. (1993). "Annonaceous acetogenins: An updated review". Phytochemical Analysis. 4: 27–48. doi:10.1002/pca.2800040108.
3. Rahalison, L.; Hamburger, M.; Hostettmann, K.; Monod, M.; Frenk, E. (1991). "A bioautographic agar overlay method for the detection of antifungal compounds from higher plants". Phytochemical Analysis. 2 (5): 199. doi:10.1002/pca.2800020503.
