= Maurice FitzGerald, 1st Earl of Desmond =

Irish nobleman

Maurice FitzGerald
- Earl of Desmond
- Tenure: 1329-1356
- Predecessor: New creation
- Successor: Maurice FitzMaurice FitzGerald
- Died: 25 January 1356; Dublin Castle
- Buried: Tralee
- Spouses: Katherine de Burgh; Margaret O'Brien; Aveline (or Eleanor)
- Issue: Maurice FitzMaurice FitzGerald; Nicholas FitzMaurice FitzGerald; Gerald FitzMaurice FitzGerald
- Parents: Thomas FitzMaurice FitzGerald; Margaret Berkeley

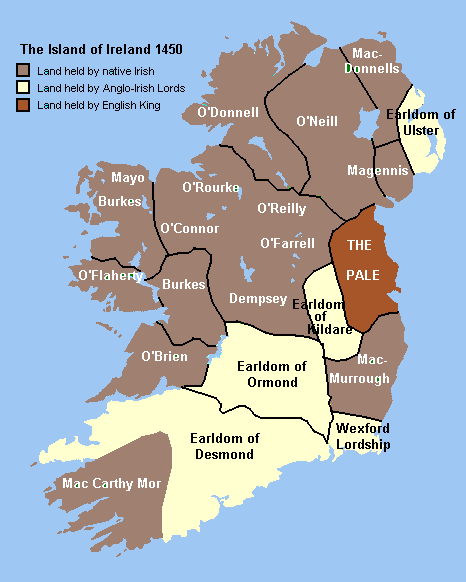
Norman Ireland, showing the Earldom of Desmond in the southwest

Maurice FitzThomas FitzGerald, 1st Earl of Desmond (died 25 January 1356) in Dublin Castle, Dublin, Ireland was an Irish nobleman in the Peerage of Ireland, Captain of Desmond Castle in Kinsale, so-called ruler of Munster, and for a short time Lord Justice of Ireland. Called "Maurice the Great", he led a rebellion against the Crown, but he was ultimately restored to favour.

== Background ==
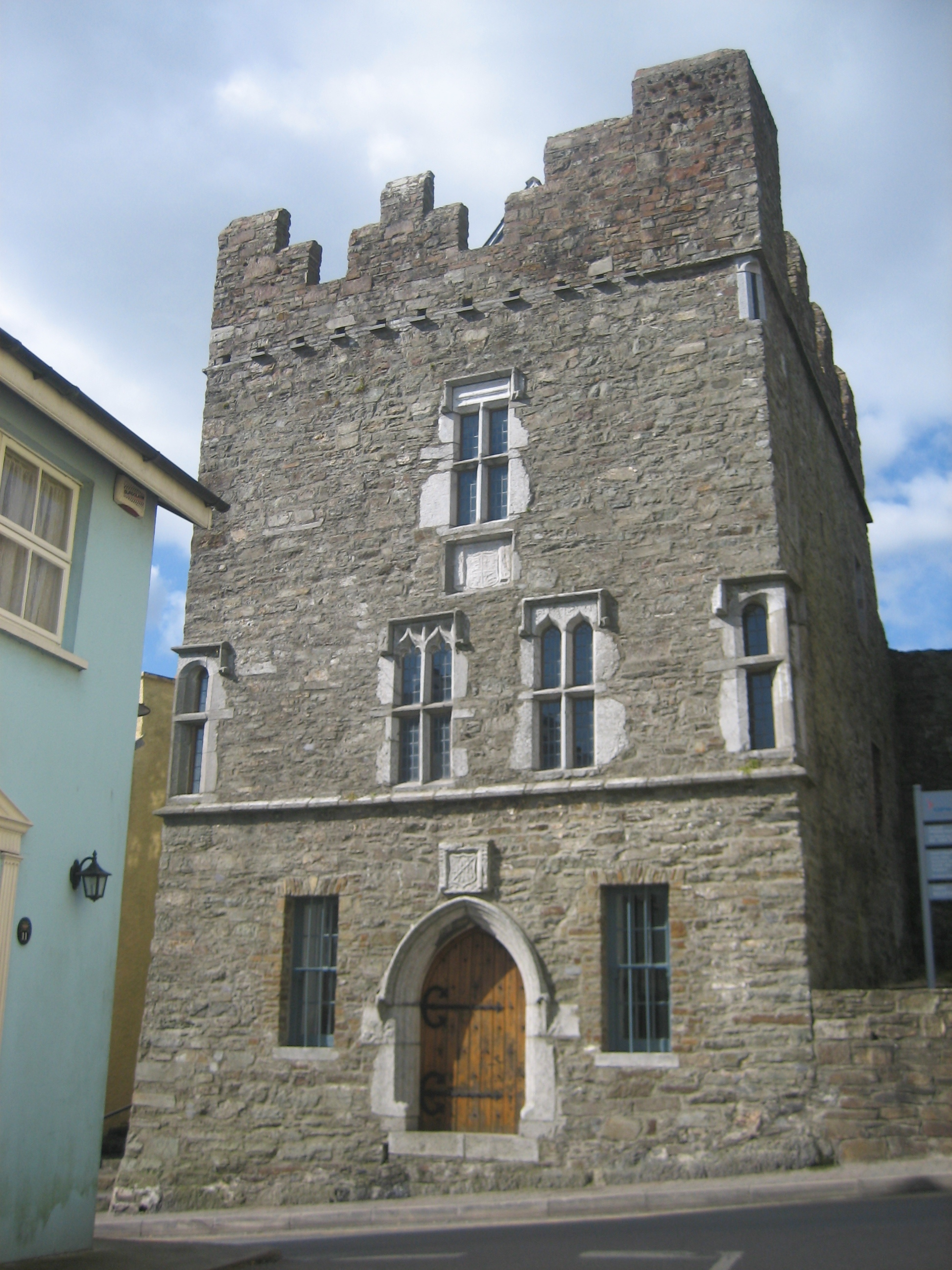
Desmond Castle, Kinsale

He was the second son of Thomas FitzMaurice FitzGerald, 2nd Baron Desmond by his wife Margaret, whose family background is still in dispute (she belonged either to the family of Barry or de Burgh). His father died in 1298 when Maurice was still a child. Maurice succeeded his elder brother Thomas FitzGerald, 3rd Baron Desmond as 4th Baron Desmond in 1307, and also inherited great wealth and large estates.

== Influence ==
By 1326 his influence was such that there were rumours of a conspiracy to make him King of Ireland; modern historians tend to dismiss the story, on the ground that the alleged conspirators were other magnates who were more interested in increasing their own power than aggrandising Desmond.

Maurice was created Earl of Desmond by Letters Patent dated at Gloucester, England, 27 August 1329, by which patent also the county palatine of Kerry was confirmed to him and his heirs male, to hold of the Crown by the service of one knight's fee. This was part of a Crown policy of attempting to win the support of the magnates by conferring earldoms on them.

In January 1330 he was summoned by John Darcy, 1st Baron Darcy de Knayth, Lord Justice of Ireland, to fight armed Irish rebels, with a promise of the King's pay. It was Desmond who introduced the practice of Coigne and Livery, the quartering of troops on the inhabitants of the district they were sent to protect.

Accepting the King's proposal, in addition to dealing with Munster and Leinster, he routed the O'Nolans and O'Murroughs, burned their lands in county Wicklow and forced them to give hostages. He recovered the castle of Ley from the O'Dempsies, and had a liberate of £100 sterling dated at Drogheda 24 August 1335, in return for the expense he had incurred in bringing his men-at-arms, hobelars (light cavalry), and foot-soldiers, from various parts of Munster to Drogheda, and there, with Lord Justice Darcy, dispersed the King's enemies.

In 1331 there were further rumours of an attempt to make him King; although there seems to be no foundation for them, the Crown took them seriously enough to imprison Desmond for over 18 months, during which time an inquisition determined that the castle, lordship, and demesne of Dunamark, at the head of Bantry Bay, belonged to the crown, and thus were his estates diminished. He was released when a number of fellow nobles stood surety for his good behaviour.

In 1339 he was engaged against Irish rebels in county Kerry where it is said he slew 1400 men, and took Nicholas, Lord of Kerry, prisoner, keeping him confined until he died as punishment for siding with the rebels against the Crown.

The same year he was present in the parliament held in Dublin. He was summoned by Writ dated at Westminster 10 July 1344, with Maurice FitzGerald, 4th Earl of Kildare, and others, to attend the King at Portsmouth "on the octaves of the nativity of the Virgin Mary", with twenty men-at-arms and fifty hobellars, at his own expense, to assist in the war against King Philip VI of France.

== Rebellion ==
Desmond, who had long been acting "with a certain disregard for the niceties of the law" now decided on open rebellion. In 1345 he presided at an assembly of Anglo-Irish magnates at Callan, County Kilkenny, ignored a summons to attend the Irish Parliament and attacked Nenagh. He was a formidable opponent, and for the next two years, his defeat was the main preoccupation of the Crown. Desmond surrendered on a promise that his life would be spared; he was imprisoned and his lands forfeit. Some of the other rebels, including Sir Eustace le Poer of Kilkenny, were hanged. He was allowed to go under guard to England to answer the charges against him.

By no means for the last time, the Crown evidently decided that it could not govern Ireland without the magnates' support: in 1348 Desmond was released, and in 1349 pardoned. His loyalty does not seem to have been in question during the last years of his life.

== Last years ==
In July 1355 he was appointed Lord Justice of Ireland for life, dying, however, the following January in Dublin Castle.

He was interred in the Church of the Friars-preachers in Tralee.

== Marriage and issue ==
The first earl of Desmond married three times:

(1) 13 August 1312 at Greencastle, Lady Katherine, fifth daughter of Richard de Burgh, 2nd Earl of Ulster and his wife Margaret, who died in Dublin in 1331.

(2) Margaret, daughter of Connor O'Brien, Prince of Thomond, by whom he had no male issue.

(3) Aveline (or Eleanor), daughter of Nicholas FitzMaurice, 3rd Baron Kerry and Slany O'Brien, daughter of Connor O'Brien, Prince of Thomond (also Burke's Peerage 2003. Volume 2. Page 2238)

By his first wife he had one son, Maurice FitzGerald, 2nd Earl of Desmond.

By his third wife he had two sons:

- Nicholas (described by Lodge as "an idiot"), ancestor to MacRobert of Bellamullin and, say some, to the McKenzies, Earl of Seaforth in Scotland.
- Gerald FitzGerald, 3rd Earl of Desmond, nicknamed Gerald the Poet.

== Ancestry ==
Ancestors of Maurice FitzGerald, 1st Earl of Desmond

Thomas FitzMaurice FitzGerald, Lord of O'Connelloe
John FitzGerald, 1st Baron Desmond
Sadbh
Maurice FitzJohn FitzGerald
Thomas FitzGerald, 2nd Baron Desmond
John de Cogan of Carrigaline
Joan de Cogan
Maurice FitzGerald, 1st Earl of Desmond
Lord Barry of Olethan
Margaret de Barry

== Notes ==
Peerage of Ireland
New creation	Earl of Desmond; 1st creation 1329–1356	Succeeded by Maurice FitzGerald
Preceded by Thomas FitzGerald	Baron Desmond; 1307–1356	Succeeded by Maurice FitzGerald
