= Thomas Gibbons (police officer) =

Thomas J. Gibbons (1904–1988), was the Philadelphia Police Department Commissioner appointed by Mayor Joseph S. Clark Jr. in 1952 and retired in 1960. He was described as "incorruptible" and a "lone wolf" for his intense efforts against La Cosa Nostra, specifically Angelo Bruno, and the corrupt police officers who supported it.
