= Battle of Callann =

13th century battle in Ireland

Coordinates: 51°53′19″N 9°26′21″W

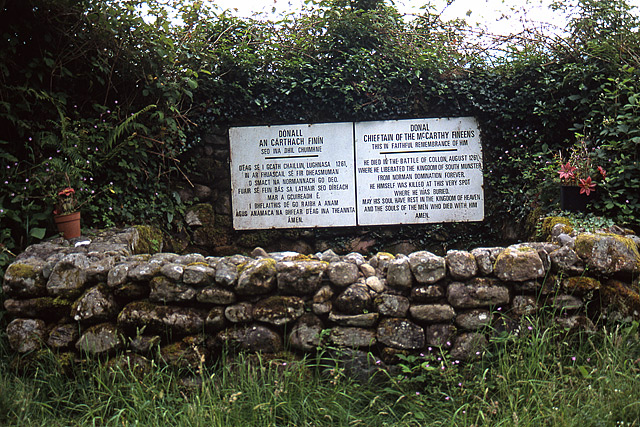
- A memorial at the site of the battle.
Date	August 1261
Location	Kilgarvan, Ireland
Result	Gaelic Irish victory

Belligerents
Kingdom of Desmond	Lordship of Ireland

Commanders and leaders
Fínghin Reanna Róin Mac Cárthaigh	John FitzThomas FitzGerald †

Strength
Soldiers of MacCarthy	Number unknown but high

Casualties and losses
Unknown	15 knights, 8 barons and a large number of ordinary soldiers

The Battle of Callann was fought in August 1261 between the English of Ireland, under John FitzGerald, and three Irish clans: MacCarthy, who held the Kingdom of Desmond, under Fínghin Mac Carthaigh, King of Desmond, ancestor of the MacCarthy Reagh dynasty. It took place in the townland of Callann or Collon near modern-day Kilgarvan, County Kerry. MacCarthaigh was victorious.

== Background ==
Ousted King of Leinster, Diarmait Mac Murchada (Dermot MacMurragh), sought help in regaining his kingdom from Cambro-Norman mercenaries. The Normans landed at Bannow Bay, on the south coast of Leinster on 1 May 1169, seized Leinster within weeks and launched raids into neighbouring kingdoms. In the autumn of 1171, King Henry II of England decided to lead a military expedition to Ireland to establish his control over both the Norman warlords and the Irish. Norman expansion continued.

== Causes of the Battle ==
In 1259, John FitzThomas FitzGerald, 1st Baron Desmond received a royal grant of Desmond and west Waterford in fee. Fineen MacCarthy, son of Donal Gott MacCarthy and King of Desmond gathered his troops.

In July 1261 the MacCarthys decided to face the Normans at Callan and won a complete victory. Both John FitzGerald and his son, Maurice, died in the fighting.

== Contemporary accounts of the battle ==
All of the following excerpts were taken from the University College of Cork's Corpus of Electronic Texts (CELT), which can be found online.

Annals of Connacht

1261.5 Very destructive war was waged against the Galls(foreigners) this year by Fingen son of Domnall Mac Carthaig and his kinsmen.

1261.6 A great hosting was made by the Fitz Geralds into Desmond, to attack Mac Carthaig; but he attacked them and routed them and fitz Thomas, John by name, and his son killed there, as well as fifteen knights, besides eight noble barons and many young squires and countless soldiery. He killed Barrach Mor (Barry More) also. Afterwards Fingen Mac Carthaig was killed by the Galls(foreigners) and the kingship of Desmond was assumed by his brother, the Ex-cleric Mac Carthaig.

Annals of Ulster

1261.4 John fitz (son of) Thomas and the Barrymore were killed by Finghin Mag Carrthaigh and by the Desmonians likewise and a large number of other Foreigners were killed. 1261.5 Finghin Mac Carrthaigh was killed by the Foreigners.

Annals of the Four Masters

1261.5 A great war was waged, and many injuries were inflicted, by Fineen Mac Carthy, son of Donnell Mac Carthy, and his brothers, on the English.

1261.6 A great army was marched by the Clann-Gerald Geraldines into Desmond, to attack Mac Carthy, i.e. Fineen. Mac Carthy attacked and defeated them; and in this contest were slain eight barons and five knights, besides others of the English nobles, as also John son of Thomas and Barry More. Countless numbers of the English common soldiers were also killed in the aforesaid battle.

1261.7 Fineen Mac Carthy was afterwards killed by the English, and the lordship of Desmond was assumed by his brother, the Aithcleireach Mac Carthy.

Annals of Loch Cé

1261.4 A great war was waged, and numerous injuries were committed, by Finghin, son of Domhnall Mac Carthaigh, and his brothers, against Foreigners in this year.

1261.5 A great hosting by the Clann-Gerald into Des-Mumha, to attack Mac Carthaigh; and Mac Carthaigh attacked them, and defeated them, and John son of Thomas, and his son (Maurice son of John), and fifteen knights and eight noble barons along with them, were slain there, besides several young men, and soldiers innumerable. And the Barrach Mór was also killed there. Finghin Mac Carthaigh was subsequently slain by the Foreigners, and the sovereignty of Des-Mumha was assumed after him by his brother, i.e. the Aithchleirech Mac Carthaigh.
