= Thomas FitzMaurice FitzGerald =

Thomas FitzMaurice
- Lord OConnello
- Born: c. 1145
- Died: 1213
- Spouse: Ellinor de Marisco
- Issue: John FitzThomas
- Parents: Maurice FitzGerald, Lord of Lanstephan; Alice de Montgomery

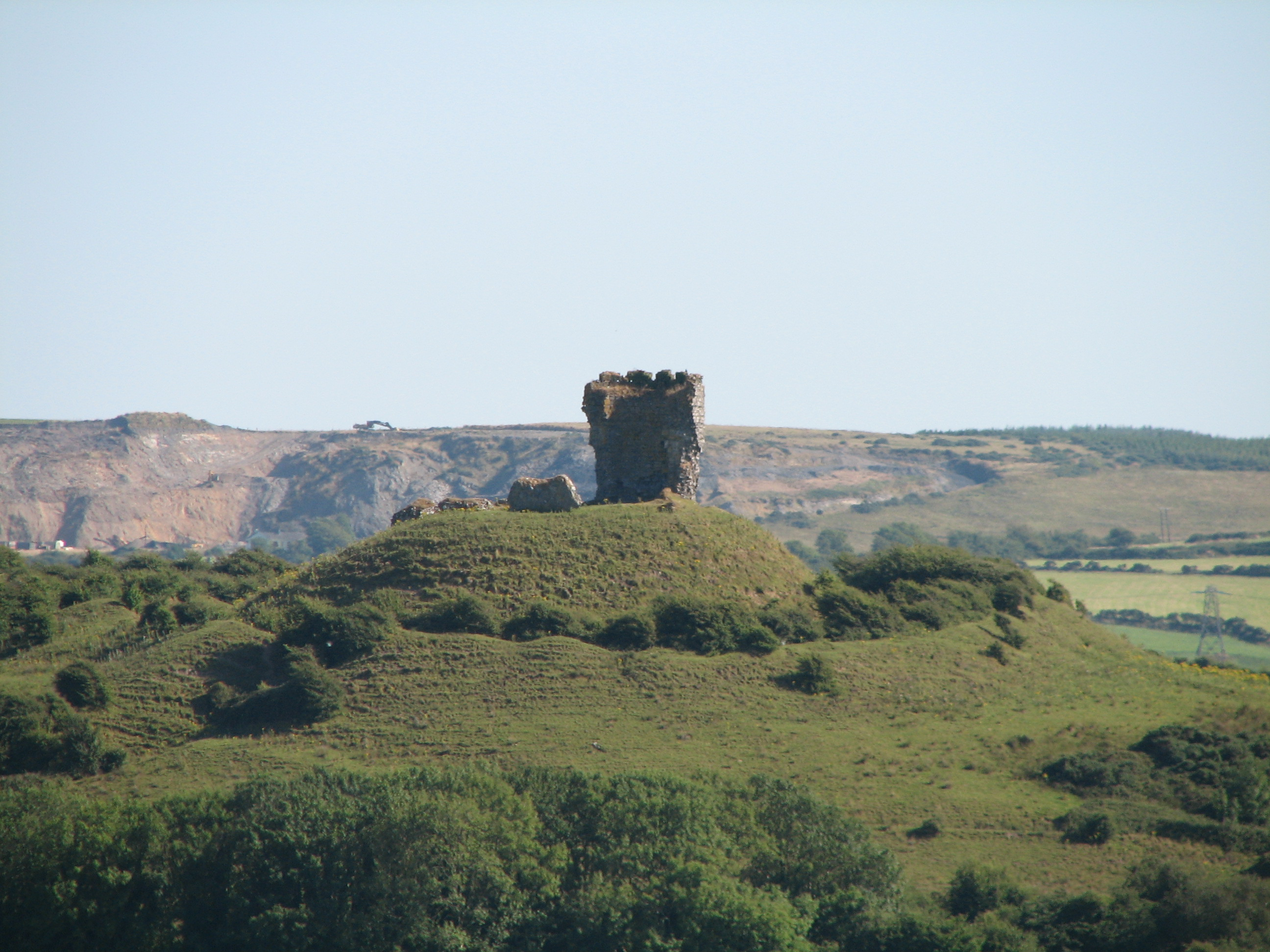
Shanid Castle. Shanid was the seat of Thomas FitzMaurice.

Thomas FitzMaurice, Lord OConnello, (c. 1145 – 1213) of Shanid, was the eldest son of Maurice FitzGerald, Lord of Lanstephan by his wife, Alice (daughter of Arnulf de Montgomery). Thomas was the progenitor of the Geraldine House of Desmond, and brother of Gerald FitzMaurice, 1st Lord of Offaly, progenitor of the Geraldine Houses of Kildare and Leinster.

In 1210, Thomas invaded Connacht with Geoffrey de Marisco as the head of a force of Anglo-Norman troops gathered in Munster, and of followers of Donnchadh Cairbreach Ó Briain, King of Thomond. This expedition aided in forcing Cathal Crobhdearg Ua Conchobair, King of Connacht into negotiations with John de Gray, Justiciar of Ireland.

== Marriage and issue ==
Thomas FitzMaurice married Ellinor, daughter of Jordan de Marisco, and sister of Geoffrey de Marisco, who was appointed justiciar of Ireland in 1215., and had issue:

1. John FitzGerald, 1st Baron Desmond

Ancestors of Thomas FitzMaurice FitzGerald

Walter FitzOtho, tenant-in-chief of lands in Berkshire, Buckinghamshire, Hampshire, and Middlesex
Gerald de Windsor, Constable of Pembroke Castle
Beatrice
Maurice FitzGerald, Lord of Lanstephan
Rhys ap Tewdwr, Prince of Deheubarth, of the House of Dinefwr
Nest ferch Rhys, Princess of Deheubarth
Gwladys ferch Rhiwallon ap Cynfyn of Powys
Thomas FitzMaurice , Lord OConnelloe
