= Thomas FitzGerald, 2nd Baron Desmond =

Thomas son of Maurice
- Baron Desmond
- Tenure: 1261–1298
- Predecessor: John FitzGerald
- Successor: Thomas FitzThomas FitzGerald
- Died: 1298
- Buried: North Abbey, Youghal
- Spouse: Margaret Berkeley
- Issue: Thomas FitzThomas FitzGerald; Maurice FitzThomas FitzGerald; John son of Thomas; Joan daughter of Thomas
- Parents: Maurice FitzJohn FitzGerald joan de Cogan

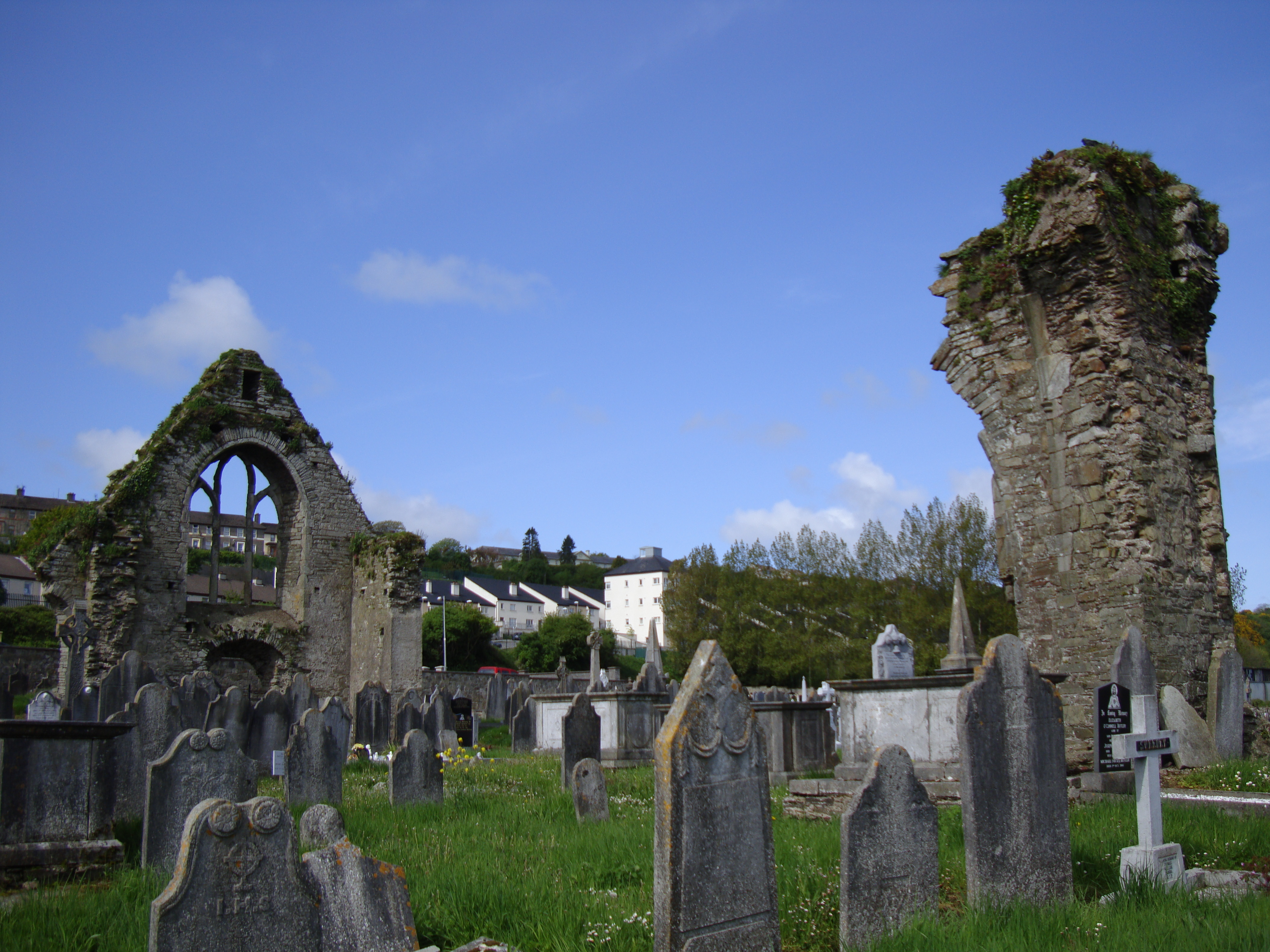
North Abbey, Youghal

Thomas Fitzmaurice FitzGerald, 2nd Baron of Desmond (died 1298), was the son of Maurice FitzJohn FitzGerald and grandson of John FitzThomas FitzGerald from whom he inherited the title.

Thomas succeeded to the barony of Desmond, which lay in Munster, in the southwest of Ireland, in 1282. Thomas's succession followed his long minority (he did not inherit his lands until the age of 21). His father and grandfather died in the Battle of Callann in 1261. Tenants in-chief could not acquire their lands and title without special permission, and most likely a large fine, before the age of 21.

Alfred Webb recounts story about this baron that:

"[He] was called 'Thomas an-Apa,' or 'Thomas Simiacus,' from an incident which is thus related in the Desmond Pedigree: 'This Thomas, being in his swadling cloaths accidentally left alone in his cradle, was by an ape carryed up to the battlements of the monastery of Traly, where the little beast, to the admiration of many spectators, dandled him to and froe, whilst everyone ran with theire beds and caddows, thinking to catch the child when it should fall from the ape. But Divine Providence prevented that danger; for the ape miraculously bore away the infant, and left him in the cradle as he found him, by which accident this Thomas was ever after nicknamed from the ape.' (A similar anecdote is related of the 1st Earl of Kildare, whose family adopted as their crest two monkeys 'environed and chained.')."

In 1294, Thomas was appointed deputy justiciar, acting as Lord Justice after the death of William d'Oddingseles. He was called to Parliament in 1295. He died in 1298, and was buried in the Dominican Priory of North Abbey, Youghal, which he had founded in 1268.

== Marriage and issue ==
Thomas Fitzmaurice FitzGerald married Margaret Berkeley daughter of Thomas Berkeley. Their children were:

1. Thomas FitzThomas FitzGerald, 3rd Baron Desmond
2. Maurice FitzThomas FitzGerald, 4th Baron Desmond, later created 1st Earl of Desmond
3. John FitzThomas FitzGerald, called Sir John of Athassell
4. Joan married John (Kittogh) Lord Barry

Ancestors of Thomas FitzGerald, 2nd Baron Desmond

Maurice FitzGerald, Lord of Lanstephan
Thomas FitzMaurice FitzGerald, Lord of O'Connelloe
John FitzGerald, 1st Baron Desmond
Sadhbh
Maurice FitzJohn FitzGerald
Thomas FitzGerald, 2nd Baron Desmond
John de Cogan of Carrigaline
Joan de Cogan

== Notes ==
Peerage of Ireland
Preceded by John FitzThomas FitzGerald	Baron Desmond; 1261–1290	Succeeded by Thomas FitzThomas FitzGerald
