= John FitzThomas, 1st Baron Desmond =

Justiciar of Ireland

John FitzThomas
- Baron Desmond
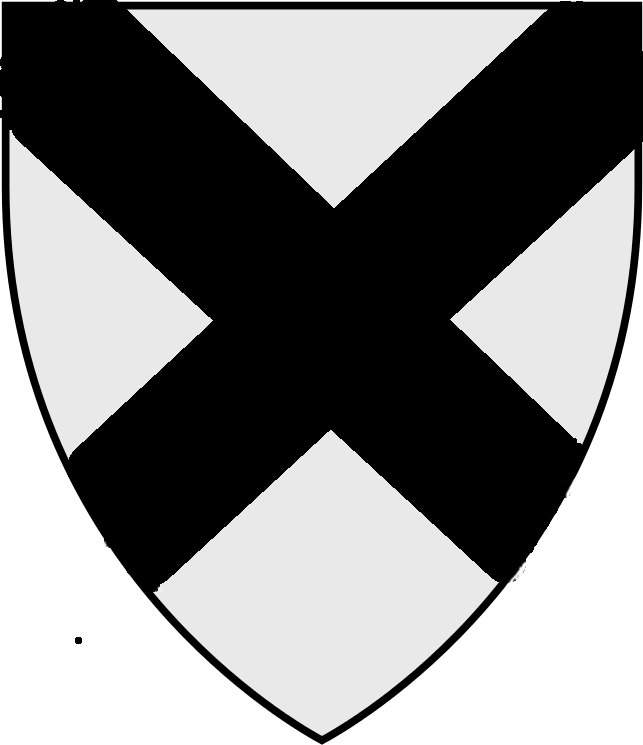
- Tenure: 1259-1261
- Predecessor: New creation
- Successor: Thomas FitzGerald
- Died: August 1261; Callan, Kilgarvan
- Wars and battles: Battle of Callann
- Issue: Maurice FitzJohn
- Parents: Thomas Fitzmaurice

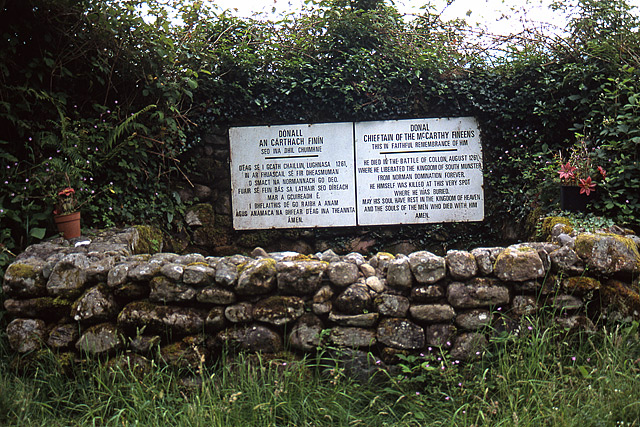
A memorial at the site of the Battle of Callann

John FitzThomas, 1st Baron Desmond (died 1261) was the son of Thomas Fitzmaurice, Lord OConnello by his wife Ellinor, daughter of Jordan de Marisco, and sister of Geoffrey de Marisco, who was appointed justiciar of Ireland in 1215. He was the grandson of Maurice FitzGerald, Lord of Lanstephan.

Thomas Fitzmaurice, Lord OConnello was the founder of the Desmond line of the FitzGerald/FitzMaurice Dynasty and ancestor of the powerful Earls of Desmond (now extinct), as well as other dynasties, including the modern Green Knights of Kerry and former Black Knights of Glin. The other extinct Desmond Geraldines are the Lords of Decies and the White Knights.

In 1259, FitzThomas received a royal grant of Desmond and west Waterford in fee. Fineen MacCarthy, son of Donal Gott MacCarthy and King of Desmond gathered his troops to oppose this. MacCarthy's forces included the O'Sullivans, whom the Norman incursions into Munster in the 1180s had forced from their original homeland in County Tipperary. They became the chief princes underneath their close kinsmen the MacCarthys. MacCarthy was also joined by the O'Donoghue, also related.

In July 1261 the three Gaelic clans joined to face the Normans at the Battle of Callann and won a complete victory. Both John FitzGerald and his son, Maurice FitzJohn, died in the fighting. John FitzGerald was succeeded by his grandson, Maurice's son Thomas FitzGerald, 2nd Baron Desmond.

The FitzMaurice Barons and later Earls of Kerry continue in the male line with the current Petty-FitzMaurice Marquesses of Lansdowne, but they descend from the 1st Baron Desmond's nephew, Thomas FitzMaurice, 1st Baron of Kerry, son of his brother Maurice FitzThomas. Thus in fact they represent a "sister" branch to the FitzGeralds of Desmond. However this technically makes them slightly closer to the FitzGeralds of Desmond than either are to the Offaly-Kildare-Leinster Geraldines, represented by the modern Dukes of Leinster, who descend from Gerald FitzMaurice, 1st Lord of Offaly, uncle of the 1st Baron Desmond.

== Marriages and issue ==
John was the father of Maurice FitzJohn, who died with him at the Battle of Callann, and of Osborn Fitzgerald, founder of the House of Corsygedol. John was succeeded in his baronial title by Maurice's son, Thomas FitzGerald, 2nd Baron Desmond.

Ancestors of John FitzThomas, 1st Baron Desmond

Walter son of Otho
Gerald de Windsor, Constable of Pembroke Castle
Beatrice
Maurice FitzGerald, Lord of Lanstephan
Rhys ap Tewdwr, Prince of Deheubarth, of the House of Dinefwr
Nest ferch Rhys, Princess of Deheubarth
Gwladys ferch Rhiwallon ap Cynfyn of Powys
Thomas Fitzmaurice, Lord OConnello
John FitzThomas, 1st Baron Desmond
Sadhbh

Peerage of Ireland
New creation	Baron Desmond; 1st creation until 1261	Succeeded by Thomas FitzMaurice FitzGerald
