= Lord Nairne =

Lordship of Nairne
- Blazon: Quarterly: 1st and 4th grandquarters: Per bend dancetty Azure and Or a Bend invected between three Crosses Patée in chief and as many Horseshoes in base all counterchanged (Bigham);2nd grandquarter:1st and 4th, Ermine, on a Bend Azure, a Magnetic Needle, pointing to the Polar Star Or (Petty); 2nd and 3rd, Argent, a Saltire Gules, and a Chief, Ermine (FitzMaurice); 3rd grandquarter: 1st, Parted per pale Sable and Argent on a Chaplet four Quatrefoils counterchanged (Nairne); 2nd counterquartered: 1st and 4th, Or on a Fess Gules between three Crosses Patée in chief of the second a Mullet Azure in base three Bezants (Mercer); 2nd and 3rd, Argent a Chevron Sable between three Boars' Heads erased Gules (Elphinstone); 3rd counterquartered: 1st and 4th, Paly of six Or and Sable (Atholl); 2nd, Or a Fess chequy Azure and Argent (Stewart); 3rd, Azure three Mullets Argent within a Double Tressure flory counterflory Or (Murray); 4th, Argent three Martlets Sable (de Flahault).
- Creation date: 27 January 1681
- Peerage: Peerage of Scotland
- First holder: Robert Nairne, 1st Lord Nairne
- Present holder: Edward John Hallam Bigham, 5th Viscount Mersey, 14th Lord Nairne
- Heir apparent: Flora Diana Joan Bigham, Mistress of Nairne
- Seat: Bignor Park
- Motto: I Advance

Lord Nairne is a title in the Peerage of Scotland, created by Charles II for Sir Robert Nairne of Strathord in 1681, which since 1995 is held by the Viscount Mersey.

== History ==
Sir Robert Nairne of Strathord (c. 1620–1683), a supporter of Charles II, was created Baron Nairne in 1681. After his death without issue the barony passed to his son-in-law, Lord William Murray (c. 1664–1726), the younger son of John Murray, 1st Marquess of Atholl, husband of his only daughter Margaret Nairne (1669–1747). Lord William Murray, who took the name of Nairne and became 2nd Baron Nairne, joined the standard of the Jacobites in 1715; he was taken prisoner at the battle of Preston and was sentenced to death. He was, however, pardoned, but his title was forfeited. On 24 June 1721 he was created Earl of Nairne, Viscount of Stanley and Lord of [ ] in the Jacobite Peerage by the Old Pretender. His son John (c. 1691–1770), who but for the forfeiture would have been the 3rd Baron Nairne, was also taken prisoner at Preston, but he was soon set at liberty. In the rising of 1745 he was one of the Jacobite leaders, being present at the battles of Prestonpans, of Falkirk and of Culloden, and consequently he was attainted in 1746; but escaped to France. His son John (died 1782) was the father of William Murray Nairne (1757–1830), who, being restored to the barony of Nairne in 1824, became the 5th baron. He married Carolina, the daughter of Laurence Oliphant (one of the foremost supporters of the Jacobite cause), and a well known Scottish songwriter. The male line became extinct when his son William, the 6th baron (1808–1837), died unmarried. The next heir was a cousin, Margaret, Baroness Keith of Stonehaven Marischal (1788–1867), wife of Auguste Charles Joseph, comte de Flahaut de la Billarderie, but she did not claim the title. In 1874, the right of her daughter, Emily the wife of the Henry, 4th Marquess of Lansdowne, was allowed by the House of Lords. The Marquess and Marchioness were both succeeded by their eldest son Henry Charles Keith Petty-Fitzmaurice, 5th Marquess of Lansdowne and 9th Lord Nairne. The lordship remained a subsidiary title of the marquessate until the death in 1944 of his grandson, Charles, 7th Marquess. Charles was succeeded in the marquessate by his cousin while the Scottish lordship passed to his sister Katherine Evelyn Constance Bigham, who became the 12th Lady Nairne. She was the wife of Edward Clive Bigham, 3rd Viscount Mersey. The Viscount and Viscountess were both succeeded by their eldest son, Richard, 4th Viscount and 13th Lord. As of 2017 the titles are held by the latter's son, the 5th Viscount and 14th Lord Nairne.

The family seat is Bignor Park, near Pulborough, Sussex.

== Lords Nairne (1681) ==
- Robert Nairne, 1st Lord Nairne (c. 1620–1683)
- William Murray, 2nd Lord Nairne (1664–1726) (attainted 1716)
- John Nairne, de jure 3rd Lord Nairne (1691–1770)
- John Nairne, de jure 4th Lord Nairne (died 1782)
- William Murray Nairne, 5th Lord Nairne (1757–1830) (restored 1824)
- William Murray Nairne, 6th Lord Nairne (1808–1837)
- Margaret Mercer Elphinstone, 7th Lady Nairne, 2nd Baroness Keith (1788–1867)
- Emily Jane Petty-FitzMaurice, Marchioness of Lansdowne, 8th Lady Nairne (1819–1895)
- Henry Charles Keith Petty-FitzMaurice, 5th Marquess of Lansdowne, 9th Lord Nairne (1845–1927)
- Henry William Edmund Petty-FitzMaurice, 6th Marquess of Lansdowne, 10th Lord Nairne (1872–1936)
- Charles Petty-Fitzmaurice, 7th Marquess of Lansdowne, 11th Lord Nairne (1917–1944)
- Katherine Evelyn Constance Bigham, Viscountess Mersey, 12th Lady Nairne (1912–1995)
- Richard Maurice Clive Bigham, 4th Viscount Mersey, 13th Lord Nairne (1934–2006)
- Edward John Hallam Bigham, 5th Viscount Mersey, 14th Lord Nairne (born 1966)

The heir presumptive is the present holder's daughter Hon. Flora Diana Joan Bigham, Mistress of Nairne (born 2003).

== Partial family tree ==
Lansdowne family tree

Baron Kerry and Lixnaw, 1223
Thomas Fitz Maurice d. c. 1260; 1st Baron Kerry an Lixnaw
Maurice Fitz Thomas d. c. 1260; 1st Baron Kerry an Lixnaw
Edmond Fitzmaurice d. 1541; 9th Baron Kerry an Lixnaw
Barony Kerry and Lixnaw resigned, 1529
Edmond Fitzmaurice d. 1549; 14th Baron Kerry and Baron Lixnaw
Gerard Fitzmaurice d. 1550; 15th Baron Kerry and Baron Lixnaw | Thomas Fitzmaurice; 1502–1590; 16th Baron Kerry and Baron Lixnaw
Patrick Fitzmaurice; 1551?–1600; 17th Baron Kerry and Baron Lixnaw
Thomas Fitzmaurice; 1574–1630; 18th Baron Kerry
Patrick FitzMaurice; 1595–1661; 19th Baron Kerry
William FitzMaurice; 1633–1697; 20th Baron Kerry
Earl of Kerry, 1753
Thomas FitzMaurice; 1668–1741; 1st Earl of Kerry, 21st Baron Kerry
Viscount FitzMaurice and Baron Dunkeron, 1751; Earl of Shelburne (2nd creation), 1753; Baron Wycombe, 1760
William FitzMaurice; 1694–1747; 2nd Earl of Kerry, 22nd Baron Kerry | John Petty-Fitzmaurice; 1706–1761; 1st Earl of Shelburne, Viscount FitzMaurice, Baron Dunkeron, and Baron Wycombe
Marquess of Lansdowne, Earl of Wycombe, and Viscount Calne and Calston, 1784
Francis Thomas-Fitzmaurice; 1740–1818; 3rd Earl of Kerry, 23rd Baron Kerry | William Petty-Fitzmaurice; 1737–1805; 1st Marquess of Lansdowne, Earl of Wycombe, and Viscount Calne and Calston, 2nd Earl of Shelburne, Viscount FitzMaurice, Baron Dunkeron, and Baron Wycombe | Baron Nairne
Baron Keith (1st creation: Ireland), 1797; Baron Keith (2nd creation: UK), 1801; Baron Keith (3rd creation: UK), 1803; Viscount Keith (UK), 1814
John Henry Petty; 1765–1809; 2nd Marquess of Lansdowne, Earl of Wycombe, and Viscount Calne and Calston, 3rd Earl of Shelburne, Viscount FitzMaurice, Baron Dunkeron, and Baron Wycombe | George Keith Elphinstone; 1746–1823; Viscount Keith, Baron Keith (Ire, UK, UK) | Jane Mercer
Viscountcy Keith and Barony Keith (1st creation) extinct, 1801
Henry Petty-Fitzmaurice; 1780–1863; 3rd Marquess of Lansdowne, Earl of Wycombe, and Viscount Calne and Calston, 4th Earl of Shelburne, Viscount FitzMaurice, Baron Dunkeron, and Baron Wycombe; 4th Earl of Kerry, 24th Baron Kerry | Margaret Mercer Elphinstone; 1788–1867; Comtesse de Flahaut, 2nd Baroness Keith (Ire, UK), 7th Lady Nairne
Baronies Keith (2nd & 3rd creations) extinct, 1867
Henry Thomas Petty-Fitzmaurice; 1816–1866; 4th Marquess of Lansdowne, Earl of Wycombe, and Viscount Calne and Calston, 5th Earl of Shelburne, Viscount FitzMaurice, Baron Dunkeron, and Baron Wycombe; 5th Earl of Kerry, 24th Baron Kerry | Emily Jane Petty-FitzMaurice; 1819–1895; 8th Lady Nairne
Baron Mersey, 1910; Viscount Mersey, 1916 | Baron Fitzmaurice, 1906
John Charles Bigham; 1840–1929; 1st Viscount Mersey | Henry Charles Keith Petty-Fitzmaurice; 1845–1927; 5th Marquess of Lansdowne, Earl of Wycombe, and Viscount Calne and Calston, 6th Earl of Shelburne, Viscount FitzMaurice, Baron Dunkeron, and Baron Wycombe, 6th Earl of Kerry, 24th Baron Kerry, 9th Lord Nairne | Edmond Fitzmaurice; 1846–1935; Baron Fitzmaurice
Barony Fitzmaurice extinct, 1935
Charles Clive Bigham; 1872–1956; 2nd Viscount Mersey | Henry William Edmund Petty-Fitzmaurice; 1872–1936; 6th Marquess of Lansdowne, Earl of Wycombe, and Viscount Calne and Calston, 7th Earl of Shelburne, Viscount FitzMaurice, Baron Dunkeron, and Baron Wycombe, 7th Earl of Kerry, 25th Baron Kerry, 10th Lord Nairne | Charles Fitzmaurice; 1874–1914
Edward Clive Bigham; 1906–1979; 3rd Viscount Mersey | Katherine Bigham; 1912–1995; 12th Lady Nairne | Charles Hope Petty-Fitzmaurice; 1917–1944; 7th Marquess of Lansdowne, Earl of Wycombe, and Viscount Calne and Calston, 8th Earl of Shelburne, Viscount FitzMaurice, Baron Dunkeron, and Baron Wycombe, 8th Earl of Kerry, 26th Baron Kerry, 11th Lord Nairne | George John Charles Mercer Nairne Petty-Fitzmaurice; 1912–1999; 8th Marquess of Lansdowne, Earl of Wycombe, and Viscount Calne and Calston, 9th Earl of Shelburne, Viscount FitzMaurice, Baron Dunkeron, and Baron Wycombe, 9th Earl of Kerry, 27th Baron Kerry
Richard Maurice Clive Bigham; 1934–2006; 4th Viscount Mersey, 13th Lord Nairne | David Edward Hugh Bigham b. 1938; Heir apparent to the Viscountcy Mersey | Charles Maurice Petty-Fitzmaurice b. 1941; 9th Marquess of Lansdowne, Earl of Wycombe, and Viscount Calne and Calston, 10th Earl of Shelburne, Viscount FitzMaurice, Baron Dunkeron, and Baron Wycombe, 10th Earl of Kerry, 28th Baron Kerry
Edward John Hallam Bigham b. 1966; 5th Viscount Mersey, 14th Lord Nairne | Charles Richard Petty Bigham b. 1967; Heir apparent in the heir presumptive to the Viscountcy Mersey | Simon Henry George Petty-Fitzmaurice b. 1970 styled Earl of Kerry
Flora Bigham, Mistress of Nairne b. 2003 styled Mistress of Nairne | George Henry Charles Petty-Fitzmaurice b. 2020 styled Viscount Calne and Calston

== See also ==
- Marquess of Atholl
- Viscount Keith
- Marquess of Lansdowne
- Viscount Mersey
