= Earl of Shelburne =

Title in the peerage of Ireland

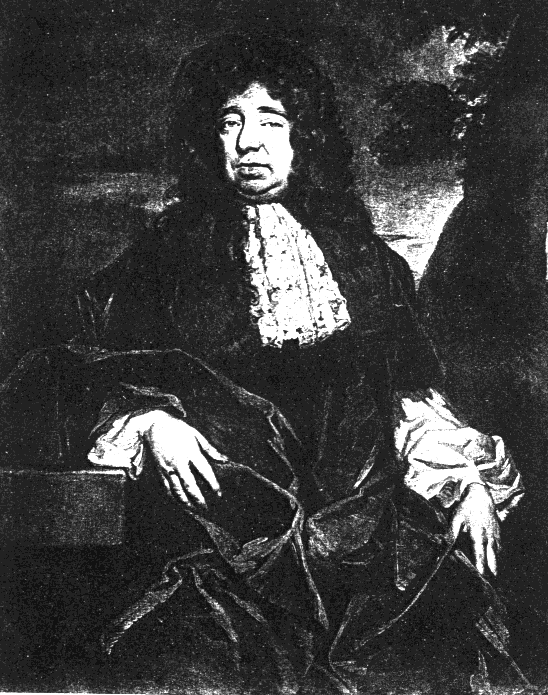
Sir William Petty

Earl of Shelburne is a title that has been created twice while the title of Baron Shelburne has been created three times. The Shelburne title was created for the first time in the Peerage of Ireland in 1688 when Elizabeth, Lady Petty, was made Baroness Shelburne. She was the wife of the noted economist Sir William Petty. The title was for life only and became extinct on her death in circa 1708. It derives from Shelburne (Síol Bhroin), a region of County Wexford, Ireland. On the same day that Lady Shelburne was elevated to the peerage, her eldest son by Sir William Petty, Charles Petty, was also raised to the Peerage of Ireland as Baron Shelburne. He died young in 1696, when the title became extinct. The barony was created for a third time in the Peerage of Ireland in 1699 in favour of the Hon. Henry Petty, younger son of Sir William Petty and Lady Shelburne. In 1719 he was further honoured when he was made Viscount Dunkerron and Earl of Shelburne, also in the Peerage of Ireland. On his death in 1751 these titles also became extinct.

The Petty estates were inherited by the late Earl's nephew, the Hon. John Fitzmaurice. He was the second son of the Hon. Anne Petty, daughter of Sir William Petty and Lady Shelburne and sister of the Earl of Shelburne, and her husband Thomas Fitzmaurice, 1st Earl of Kerry. By a private act of Parliament, FitzMaurice's Name Act 1750 (24 Geo. 2. c. 43 Pr.), he assumed the surname of Petty on succeeding to his maternal uncle's estates in 1751 and the same year he was raised to the Peerage of Ireland as Baron Dunkeron and Viscount FitzMaurice. In 1753 the earldom was also revived when he was made Earl of Shelburne in the Peerage of Ireland. For further history of these titles, see the Marquess of Lansdowne.

== Baroness Shelburne (1688) ==
- Elizabeth Petty, 1st Baroness Shelburne (died c. 1708)

== Baron Shelburne (1688) ==
- Charles Petty, 1st Baron Shelburne (c. 1673–1696)

== Earls of Shelburne (1719) ==
- Henry Petty, 1st Earl of Shelburne (1675–1751)

== Earls of Shelburne (1751) ==
- see the Marquess of Lansdowne

Lansdowne family tree

Baron Kerry and Lixnaw, 1223
Thomas Fitz Maurice d. c. 1260; 1st Baron Kerry an Lixnaw
Maurice Fitz Thomas d. c. 1260; 1st Baron Kerry an Lixnaw
Edmond Fitzmaurice d. 1541; 9th Baron Kerry an Lixnaw
Barony Kerry and Lixnaw resigned, 1529
Edmond Fitzmaurice d. 1549; 14th Baron Kerry and Baron Lixnaw
Gerard Fitzmaurice d. 1550; 15th Baron Kerry and Baron Lixnaw	Thomas Fitzmaurice; 1502–1590; 16th Baron Kerry and Baron Lixnaw
Patrick Fitzmaurice; 1551?–1600; 17th Baron Kerry and Baron Lixnaw
Thomas Fitzmaurice; 1574–1630; 18th Baron Kerry
Patrick FitzMaurice; 1595–1661; 19th Baron Kerry
William FitzMaurice; 1633–1697; 20th Baron Kerry
Earl of Kerry, 1753
Thomas FitzMaurice; 1668–1741; 1st Earl of Kerry, 21st Baron Kerry
Viscount FitzMaurice and Baron Dunkeron, 1751; Earl of Shelburne (2nd creation), 1753; Baron Wycombe, 1760
William FitzMaurice; 1694–1747; 2nd Earl of Kerry, 22nd Baron Kerry	John Petty-Fitzmaurice; 1706–1761; 1st Earl of Shelburne, Viscount FitzMaurice, Baron Dunkeron, and Baron Wycombe
Marquess of Lansdowne, Earl of Wycombe, and Viscount Calne and Calston, 1784
Francis Thomas-Fitzmaurice; 1740–1818; 3rd Earl of Kerry, 23rd Baron Kerry	William Petty-Fitzmaurice; 1737–1805; 1st Marquess of Lansdowne, Earl of Wycombe, and Viscount Calne and Calston, 2nd Earl of Shelburne, Viscount FitzMaurice, Baron Dunkeron, and Baron Wycombe	Baron Nairne
Baron Keith (1st creation: Ireland), 1797; Baron Keith (2nd creation: UK), 1801; Baron Keith (3rd creation: UK), 1803; Viscount Keith (UK), 1814
John Henry Petty; 1765–1809; 2nd Marquess of Lansdowne, Earl of Wycombe, and Viscount Calne and Calston, 3rd Earl of Shelburne, Viscount FitzMaurice, Baron Dunkeron, and Baron Wycombe	George Keith Elphinstone; 1746–1823; Viscount Keith, Baron Keith (Ire, UK, UK)	Jane Mercer
Viscountcy Keith and Barony Keith (1st creation) extinct, 1801
Henry Petty-Fitzmaurice; 1780–1863; 3rd Marquess of Lansdowne, Earl of Wycombe, and Viscount Calne and Calston, 4th Earl of Shelburne, Viscount FitzMaurice, Baron Dunkeron, and Baron Wycombe; 4th Earl of Kerry, 24th Baron Kerry	Margaret Mercer Elphinstone; 1788–1867; Comtesse de Flahaut, 2nd Baroness Keith (Ire, UK), 7th Lady Nairne
Baronies Keith (2nd & 3rd creations) extinct, 1867
Henry Thomas Petty-Fitzmaurice; 1816–1866; 4th Marquess of Lansdowne, Earl of Wycombe, and Viscount Calne and Calston, 5th Earl of Shelburne, Viscount FitzMaurice, Baron Dunkeron, and Baron Wycombe; 5th Earl of Kerry, 24th Baron Kerry	Emily Jane Petty-FitzMaurice; 1819–1895; 8th Lady Nairne
Baron Mersey, 1910; Viscount Mersey, 1916	Baron Fitzmaurice, 1906
John Charles Bigham; 1840–1929; 1st Viscount Mersey	Henry Charles Keith Petty-Fitzmaurice; 1845–1927; 5th Marquess of Lansdowne, Earl of Wycombe, and Viscount Calne and Calston, 6th Earl of Shelburne, Viscount FitzMaurice, Baron Dunkeron, and Baron Wycombe, 6th Earl of Kerry, 24th Baron Kerry, 9th Lord Nairne	Edmond Fitzmaurice; 1846–1935; Baron Fitzmaurice
Barony Fitzmaurice extinct, 1935
Charles Clive Bigham; 1872–1956; 2nd Viscount Mersey	Henry William Edmund Petty-Fitzmaurice; 1872–1936; 6th Marquess of Lansdowne, Earl of Wycombe, and Viscount Calne and Calston, 7th Earl of Shelburne, Viscount FitzMaurice, Baron Dunkeron, and Baron Wycombe, 7th Earl of Kerry, 25th Baron Kerry, 10th Lord Nairne	Charles Fitzmaurice; 1874–1914
Edward Clive Bigham; 1906–1979; 3rd Viscount Mersey	Katherine Bigham; 1912–1995; 12th Lady Nairne	Charles Hope Petty-Fitzmaurice; 1917–1944; 7th Marquess of Lansdowne, Earl of Wycombe, and Viscount Calne and Calston, 8th Earl of Shelburne, Viscount FitzMaurice, Baron Dunkeron, and Baron Wycombe, 8th Earl of Kerry, 26th Baron Kerry, 11th Lord Nairne	George John Charles Mercer Nairne Petty-Fitzmaurice; 1912–1999; 8th Marquess of Lansdowne, Earl of Wycombe, and Viscount Calne and Calston, 9th Earl of Shelburne, Viscount FitzMaurice, Baron Dunkeron, and Baron Wycombe, 9th Earl of Kerry, 27th Baron Kerry
Richard Maurice Clive Bigham; 1934–2006; 4th Viscount Mersey, 13th Lord Nairne	David Edward Hugh Bigham b. 1938; Heir apparent to the Viscountcy Mersey	Charles Maurice Petty-Fitzmaurice b. 1941; 9th Marquess of Lansdowne, Earl of Wycombe, and Viscount Calne and Calston, 10th Earl of Shelburne, Viscount FitzMaurice, Baron Dunkeron, and Baron Wycombe, 10th Earl of Kerry, 28th Baron Kerry
Edward John Hallam Bigham b. 1966; 5th Viscount Mersey, 14th Lord Nairne	Charles Richard Petty Bigham b. 1967; Heir apparent in the heir presumptive to the Viscountcy Mersey	Simon Henry George Petty-Fitzmaurice b. 1970 styled Earl of Kerry
Flora Bigham, Mistress of Nairne b. 2003 styled Mistress of Nairne	George Henry Charles Petty-Fitzmaurice b. 2020 styled Viscount Calne and Calston
