= Marquess of Lansdowne =

Title in the Peerage of Great Britain

Marquessate of Lansdowne
- Arms of the Marquess of Lansdowne Blazon Arms: Quarterly : 1st and 4th Ermine, on a bend, azure a magnetic needle pointing at a polar star, or, (Petty); 2nd and 3rd Argent, a saltier, gules, a chief, ermine (Fitzmaurice). Crests: 1st, a beehive beset with bees, diversely volant, proper ; 2nd, a centaur drawing a bow and arrow, proper, the part from the waist argent Supporters: Two pegasi, ermine.; bridled, crined, winged, and unguled, or, each charged on the shoulder with a fienr-de-lis, azure. Motto: Virtute non verbis (By courage, not words).
- Creation date: 6 December 1784
- Created by: George III
- Peerage: Peerage of Great Britain
- First holder: William Petty Fitzmaurice, 2nd Earl of Shelburne
- Present holder: Charles Petty-Fitzmaurice, 9th Marquess of Lansdowne
- Heir apparent: Simon Petty-Fitzmaurice, Earl of Kerry
- Remainder to: 1st Marquess' heirs male of the body lawfully begotten
- Subsidiary titles: Earl of Kerry; Earl of Shelburne; Earl of Wycombe; Viscount Clanmaurice; Viscount Fitzmaurice; Viscount Calne and Calston; Baron of Kerry and Lixnaw; Baron Dunkeron; Baron Wycombe of Chipping Wycombe
- Seat: Bowood House
- Former seats: Lansdowne House, Meikleour House
- Motto: VIRTUTE NON VERBIS (By courage, not words)

Marquess of Lansdowne is a title in the Peerage of Great Britain created in 1784, and held by the head of the Petty-Fitzmaurice family. The first Marquess served as Prime Minister of Great Britain.

== Origins ==
This branch of the Fitzmaurice family descends from John Fitzmaurice, second son of Thomas Fitzmaurice, 1st Earl of Kerry (see Earl of Kerry for earlier history of the family), and his wife Anne, the daughter of the political economist Sir William Petty, whose wife had been created Baroness Shelburne for her own life only and whose two sons had been created at different times Baron Shelburne in the Peerage of Ireland and Earl of Shelburne respectively, but who had both died without heirs. In 1751, on the death of his maternal uncle Henry Petty, Earl of Shelburne, John FitzMaurice succeeded to his estates and assumed by a private act of Parliament, FitzMaurice's Name Act 1750 (24 Geo. 2. c. 43 Pr.), the surname of Petty in addition to FitzMaurice. That same year, he was created Viscount FitzMaurice and Baron Dunkeron in the Peerage of Ireland. In 1753, the earldom held by his uncle was revived when he was made Earl of Shelburne, in the County of Wexford, in the Peerage of Ireland. He later represented Wycombe in the House of Commons as a Whig, his Irish peerages not disbarring him. However, in 1760 Viscount FitzMaurice was created Baron Wycombe, of Chepping Wycombe in the County of Buckingham, in the Peerage of Great Britain, which gave him a seat in the House of Lords at Westminster and meant that he could no longer sit in the Commons.

Through his first wife Lady Sophia Carteret (1745–1771), only daughter of Robert Carteret, 3rd Earl Granville, Fitzmaurice acquired large estates, including Lansdowne Hill near Bath, from which his son later took a new title.

From 1765 until the Reform Act 1832, the head of the family controlled the two seats in parliament of the pocket borough of Calne in Wiltshire. After 1832, there was only one seat and a wider franchise, but a member of the family was usually elected until the borough was abolished in 1885.

== Creations ==
The first Earl of Shelburne of the new creation was succeeded by his eldest son William Petty-FitzMaurice, 2nd Earl of Shelburne. He was a prominent statesman and served as Prime Minister of Great Britain from 1782 to 1783. His brother Thomas FitzMaurice (1742–1793) of Cliveden, was a Member of Parliament. In 1784, the second Earl of Shelburne was created Marquess of Lansdowne, in the County of Somerset, Earl of Wycombe, of Chepping Wycombe, and Viscount Calne and Calston, referring to Calne and Calstone in the County of Wiltshire, all in the Peerage of Great Britain. However, he is better known to history under his former title of Earl of Shelburne. He was succeeded by his son from his first marriage to Lady Sophia Carteret, John Henry Petty-Fitzmaurice, 2nd Marquess of Lansdowne. He died childless in 1809 and was succeeded by his half-brother, the third Marquess, the son of their father’s second marriage, to Lady Louisa FitzPatrick. Known as Lord Henry Petty from 1784 to 1809, he was one of the most influential Whig politicians of the first half of the 19th century. In a ministerial career spanning over fifty years, he served as Chancellor of the Exchequer from 1806 to 1807, as Home Secretary from 1827 to 1828, as Lord President of the Council from 1830 to 1834, 1835 to 1841, and 1846 to 1852, and as Minister without Portfolio from 1852 to 1858. He twice declined to become Prime Minister and in 1857 refused the offer of a dukedom from Queen Victoria. In 1818 Lansdowne also succeeded his cousin as fourth Earl of Kerry. His eldest son William Petty FitzMaurice, Earl of Kerry, was a Member of Parliament for Calne, but predeceased his father, without having a son. Lansdowne was therefore succeeded by his second son, the fourth Marquess. He had already in 1856 been summoned to the House of Lords through a writ of acceleration in his father's junior title of Baron Wycombe and served under Lord Palmerston as Parliamentary Under-Secretary of State for Foreign Affairs from 1856 to 1858. He married as his second wife Emily Jane Mercer-Elphinstone-de Flahault, 8th Lady Nairne (see the Lord Nairne), eldest daughter of the French general and statesman Charles Joseph, comte de Flahaut, and his wife Margaret Nairne, 7th Lady Nairne.

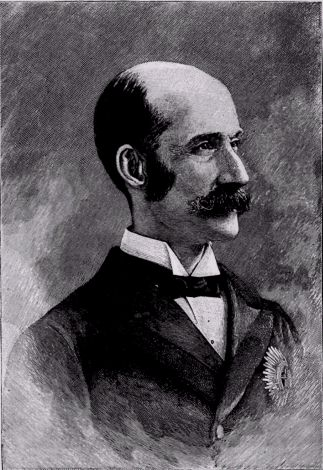
Henry Petty-Fitzmaurice, 5th Marquess of Lansdowne

He was succeeded by his eldest son from his second marriage, the fifth Marquess. Like his grandfather, he was a prominent statesman and had an equally long ministerial career. Lord Lansdowne was Governor General of Canada from 1883 to 1888, Viceroy of India from 1888 to 1894, Secretary of State for War from 1895 to 1900, Foreign Secretary from 1900 to 1905, Leader of the Conservative Party in the Lords from 1911 to 1916, and also served in the war-time coalition government as Minister without Portfolio from 1915 to 1916. In 1895 he succeeded his mother as Lord Nairne. His eldest son, Henry Petty-Fitzmaurice, sat as Unionist Member of Parliament for West Derbyshire from 1908 to 1918 and was a Senator of the Irish Free State in 1922. In 1927 he succeeded his father and became the 6th Marquess.

On his death in 1936 he was succeeded by his second but eldest surviving son, the seventh Marquess, who was killed in action in 1944 during the Second World War, unmarried. As the third and youngest brother, Lord Edward Norman Petty-Fitzmaurice, had been killed in action only a week before, the Scottish lordship of Nairne was passed on to their eldest sister Katherine (see Lord Nairne for later history of this title). Lord Lansdowne was survived in the remaining titles by his first cousin, the eighth Marquess. He was the son of Major Lord Charles George Francis Mercer Nairne Petty-Fitzmaurice (1874–1914), second son of the fifth Marquess. Born George John Charles Mercer Nairne, he assumed by Decree of the Lord Lyon the additional surnames of Petty-Fitzmaurice in 1947. Lord Lansdowne sat on the Conservative benches in the House of Lords and served as Joint Parliamentary Under-Secretary of State for Foreign Affairs from 1958 to 1962 and as Minister of State for Colonial Affairs from 1962 to 1964. As of 2014 the titles are held by his eldest son, the ninth Marquess, who succeeded in 1999.

The courtesy title for the Lord Lansdowne's eldest son and heir apparent alternates between Earl of Kerry and Earl of Shelburne.

== Estates and residences ==
=== Country seat ===
The family seat is Bowood House, near Calne, Wiltshire. A major late-1990s/early-2000s housing development in the northwest of Calne was named Lansdowne Park after the local seat.

=== Estates ===
In the 1883 edition of John Bateman's The Great Landowners of Great Britain and Ireland, Henry Petty-Fitzmaurice, 5th Marquess of Lansdowne's estates were recorded as spanning 142,916 acres across England, Ireland and Scotland, including 11,145 acres in Wiltshire, 4 acres in Hampshire, 94,983 acres in County Kerry, 12,995 acres in County Meath, 8,980 acres in Queen's County, 2,132 acres in County Dublin, 1,642 acres in County Limerick, 617 acres in King's County, 9,070 acres in Perthshire, and 1,348 acres in Kinross-shire, which produced a combined annual income of £62,025. Bateman noted that the Scottish properties, comprising 10,418 acres and producing £8,811 annually, belonged to Emily, Dowager Marchioness of Lansdowne, widow of the 4th Marquess.

=== London residences ===
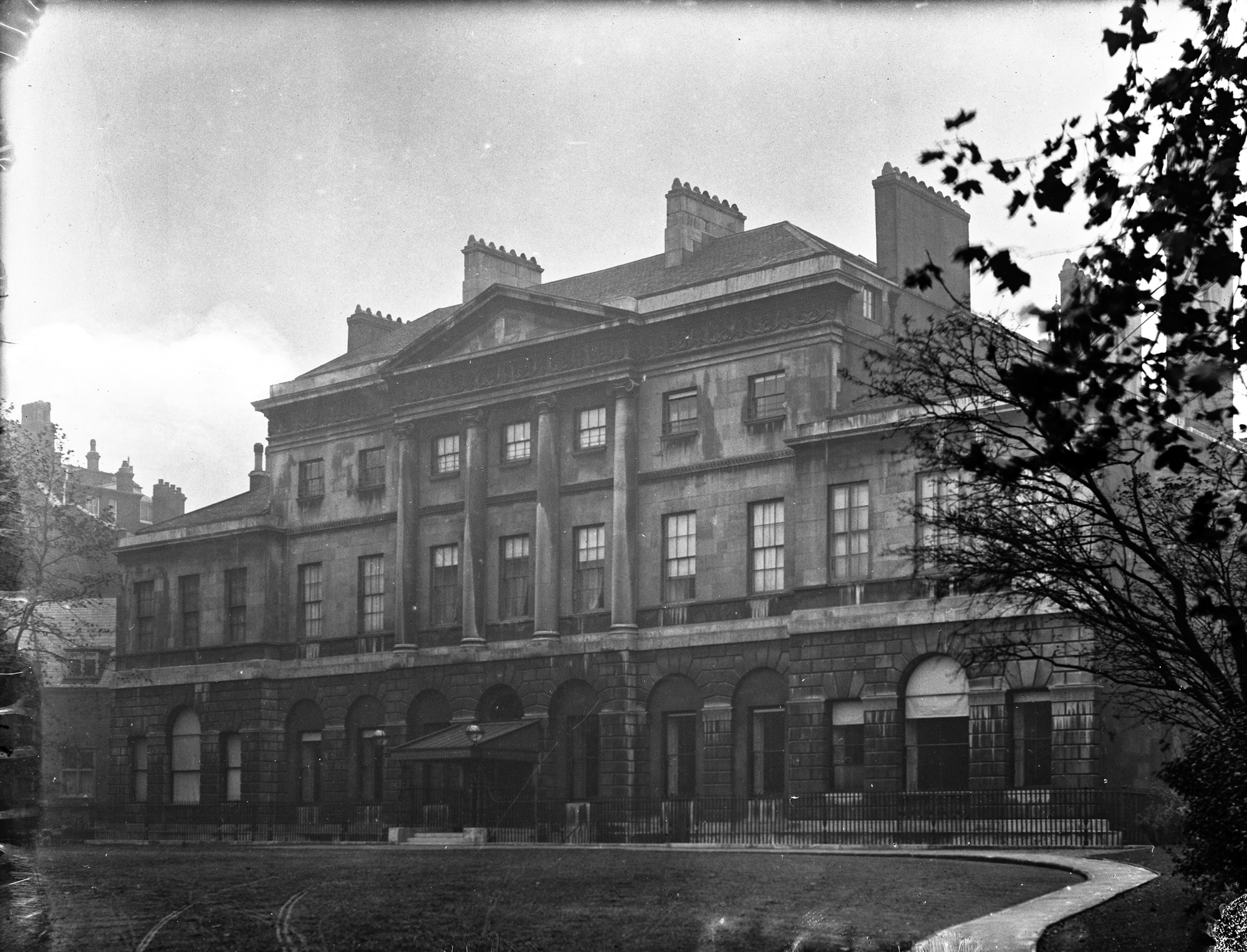
Lansdowne House, the London residence of the Marquesses of Lansdowne from the 18th century until 1929

From 1768 to 1921 the family's principal London residence was Lansdowne House, situated at the south-west corner of Berkeley Square in Mayfair. The house was commissioned in 1761 by John Stuart, 3rd Earl of Bute, from the architect Robert Adam, but was sold while still unfinished in 1765 to William Petty, 2nd Earl of Shelburne, later the 1st Marquess of Lansdowne. Shelburne retained Adam to complete the house, and moved there with his family in 1768. Following his creation as Marquess of Lansdowne in 1784 the residence became known as Lansdowne House.

Successive generations of the family altered and enlarged the house. George Dance the Younger remodelled several interiors for the 1st Marquess during the 1790s, while Robert Smirke carried out further alterations between 1816 and 1819 for Henry Petty-Fitzmaurice, 3rd Marquess of Lansdowne. Later additions included a sculpture gallery designed by Thomas Henry Wyatt during the 1870s. Under the 3rd Marquess, one of the leading Whig statesmen of the 19th century, Lansdowne House became an important centre of political and social life. Following the destruction of the old Palace of Westminster by fire in 1834, its dining room was used for meetings of the Privy Council until 1852.

Lansdowne House remained the property of the Petty-Fitzmaurice family throughout the 19th century and served as the London residence of Henry Petty-Fitzmaurice, 5th Marquess of Lansdowne during his long political career, including his periods as Foreign Secretary and leader of the Conservative opposition in the House of Lords. After the First World War the family ceased to occupy the house regularly, and the 5th Marquess subsequently leased it to the department-store proprietor Harry Gordon Selfridge in February 1921. The house passed out of the family's ownership in 1929, shortly after the succession of the 6th Marquess.

The building was substantially altered in 1931–32, when part of the original house was demolished to permit the construction of Fitzmaurice Place. Several important interiors were dismantled: Adam's principal drawing room was transferred to the Philadelphia Museum of Art, while the former dining room was installed at the Metropolitan Museum of Art in New York. The surviving portion of the house was adapted for club use and opened as the Lansdowne Club in 1935. It remains a Grade II* listed building.

== Earls of Shelburne (1753) ==
- John Petty-Fitzmaurice, 1st Earl of Shelburne (1706–1761)
- William Petty-Fitzmaurice, 2nd Earl of Shelburne (1737–1805), created Marquess of Lansdowne in 1784

== Marquesses of Lansdowne (1784) ==
- William Petty-Fitzmaurice, 1st Marquess of Lansdowne (1737–1805)
- John Henry Petty-Fitzmaurice, 2nd Marquess of Lansdowne (1765–1809)
- Henry Petty-Fitzmaurice, 3rd Marquess of Lansdowne (1780–1863)
- Henry Petty-Fitzmaurice, 4th Marquess of Lansdowne (1816–1866)
- Henry Charles Keith Petty-FitzMaurice, 5th Marquess of Lansdowne (1845–1927)
- Henry William Edmund Petty-FitzMaurice, 6th Marquess of Lansdowne (1872–1936)
- Charles Hope Petty-FitzMaurice, 7th Marquess of Lansdowne (1917–1944)
- George John Charles Mercer Nairne Petty-FitzMaurice, 8th Marquess of Lansdowne (1912–1999)
- Charles Maurice Petty-FitzMaurice, 9th Marquess of Lansdowne (b. 1941)

The heir apparent is the present holder's son, Simon Henry George Petty-Fitzmaurice, Earl of Kerry (b. 1970)
The heir apparent's heir apparent is his son George Henry Charles Petty-Fitzmaurice, Viscount Calne and Calstone (b. 2020)

== Family tree ==
Fitzmaurice family tree and the FitzGerald dynasty
Note that there are differing accounts as to which FitzMaurice was the 1st Baron Kerry. The Complete Peerage starts the numbering at Maurice Fitzthomas. Irish pedigrees starts the numbering at Thomas Fitzmaurice.

Maurice FitzGerald "Maurice de Windsor" c. 1105–c. 1176; Lord of Llanstephan, Baron of Naas, Lord of Maynooth
Robert FitzMaurice; Details unknown	Thomas FitzMaurice FitzGerald c. 1145–1213; Lord OConnello	Gerald FitzMaurice c. 1150–1203; 1st Baron of Offaly
Baron Kerry and Lixnaw, 1223	See Baron of Offaly
Thomas Fitzmaurice c. 1220–1280; 1st Baron Kerry and Lixnaw; Lord OConnello	John FitzThomas d. 1261; 1st Baron Desmond
Maurice Fitzthomas d. c. 1260; 2nd Baron Kerry and Lixnaw	Maurice FitzJohn FitzGerald d. 1261
Nicholas Fitzthomas d. 1324; 3rd Baron Kerry and Lixnaw	Thomas Fitzmaurice FitzGerald d. 1298; 2nd Baron Desmond
Earl of Desmond (1st creation), 1329
Maurice Fitzthomas d. 1339; 4th Baron Kerry and Lixnaw	John Fitzthomas d. 1348; 5th Baron Kerry and Lixnaw	Aveline (Eleanor)	Maurice FitzThomas FitzGerald d. 1358; 1st Earl of Desmond, 4th Baron Desmond	Thomas FitzThomas FitzGerald; 1290–1307; 3rd Baron Desmond
Maurice FitzJohn Fitzmaurice d. 1398; 6th Baron Kerry and Lixnaw	Maurice FitzMaurice FitzGerald "Maurice Óg"; 1335–1398; 2nd Earl of Desmond, 5th Baron Desmond	Gerald FitzGerald; 1335–1398; 3rd Earl of Desmond, 6th Baron Desmond
Patrick FitzMaurice FitzJohn d. c. 1410; 7th Baron Kerry and Lixnaw	John FitzGerald d. 1399; 4th Earl of Desmond, 7th Baron Desmond	James FitzGerald d. 1462; 6th Earl of Desmond, 9th Baron Desmond
Thomas FitzMaurice d. 1469; 8th Baron Kerry and Lixnaw	Thomas FitzGerald c. 1386–1420; 5th Earl of Desmond, 8th Baron Desmond	Thomas FitzJames FitzGerald "the Great Earl" d. c. 1467/68; 7th Earl of Desmond, 10th Baron Desmond
Edmond FitzMaurice d. 1541; 9th Baron Kerry and Lixnaw	James fitz Thomas FitzGerald; 1459–1487; 8th Earl of Desmond, 11th Baron Desmond	Maurice fitz Thomas FitzGerald d. 1520; 9th (or 10th) Earl of Desmond, 12th Baron Desmond	Thomas fitz Thomas FitzGerald; 1454–1534; 11th (or 12th) Earl of Desmond, 14th Baron Desmond	John fitz Thomas FitzGerald d. 1536; 12th Earl of Desmond de facto, 15th Baron Desmond de facto
Thomas FitzMaurice; Details unknown	James fitz Maurice FitzGerald d. 1529; 10th (or 11th) Earl of Desmond, 13th Baron Desmond	Maurice fitz Thomas FitzGerald d. 1529	James fitz John FitzGerald d. 1558; 13th (or 14th) Earl of Desmond, 16th Baron Desmond
Edmond FitzMaurice d. 1543; 10th Baron Kerry and Lixnaw	Joan Fitzgerald d. 1565	James fitz Maurice FitzGerald ("Court Page") d. 1540; 12th (or 13th) Earl of Desmond de jure, 15th Baron Desmond de jure
Barony of Kerry and Lixnaw resigned, 1529
Baron Odorney and Viscount Kilmaule, 1537
Edmond FitzMaurice d. 1541; 11th Baron Kerry and Lixnaw	Patrick FitzMaurice d. 1547; 12th Baron Kerry and Lixnaw	Gerard FitzMaurice d. 1550; 15th Baron Kerry and Lixnaw	Thomas Fitzmaurice; 1502–1590; 16th Baron Kerry and Lixnaw	Margaret "the Fair"	Thomas Butler ("Black Tom") c. 1531–1614; Earl of Ormond and Earl of Ossory	Gerald FitzGerald ("Rebel Earl") c. 1533–1583; 14th (or 15th or 16th) Earl of Desmond, 17th Baron Desmond
Barony of Odorney and viscountcy of Kilmaule extinct, 1541	Earldom of Desmond (1st creation) attainted, 1582
Lord Dingwall (2nd creation), 1609; Earl of Desmond (3rd creation) and Baron Dunmore, 1619	Earl of Desmond (2nd creation for life), 1600
Thomas FitzMaurice d. 1549; 13th Baron Kerry and Lixnaw	Edmond FitzMaurice d. 1549; 14th Baron Kerry and Lixnaw	Patrick Fitzmaurice; 1551?–1600; 17th Baron Kerry and Lixnaw	Richard Preston d. 1628; Earl of Desmond and Baron Dunmore, 1st Lord Dingwall	Elizabeth (Butler) Preston c. 1585–1628	James FitzGerald ("Tower Earl"); 1571–1601; Earl of Desmond
Viscount Feilding and Baron Feilding, 1620; Earl of Denbigh, 1622	Earldom of Desmond (3rd creation) and barony of Dunmore extinct, 1628	Earldom of Desmond (2nd creation) extinct, 1601
Thomas Fitzmaurice; 1574–1630; 18th Baron Kerry	William Feilding c. 1587–1643; 1st Earl of Denbigh, etc.
Baron St. Liz, 1664	Viscount Callan and Baron Feilding of Lecagh, 1622; Earl of Desmond (4th creation) on reversion, 1628
Patrick FitzMaurice; 1595–1661; 19th Baron Kerry	Basil Feilding c. 1608–1675; 2nd Earl Denbigh, etc., 1st Baron St. Liz	George Feilding c. 1614–1665; 1st Earl of Desmond, etc.	Earldom of Desmond created in expectation of marriage, which did not happen	Elizabeth (Preston) Butler; 1615–1684; 2nd Lady Dingwall suo jure
William FitzMaurice; 1633–1697; 20th Baron Kerry	William Feilding; 1640–1685; 3rd Earl Denbigh, etc. 2nd Earl of Desmond, etc., 2nd Baron St. Liz	Thomas Butler; 1634–1680; Earl of Ossory
Earl of Kerry, 1753
Thomas FitzMaurice; 1668–1741; 1st Earl of Kerry, 21st Baron Kerry	Basil Feilding; 1668–1717; 4th Earl Denbigh, etc. 3rd Earl of Desmond, etc., 3rd Baron St. Liz	James Butler; 1665–1745; Duke of Ormonde, Earl of Ossory, 3rd Lord Dingwall
Lordship of Dingwall (2nd creation) forfeit, 1715
Viscount FitzMaurice and Baron Dunkeron, 1751; Earl of Shelburne (2nd creation), 1753; Baron Wycombe, 1760
William FitzMaurice; 1694–1747; 2nd Earl of Kerry, 22nd Baron Kerry	John Petty-Fitzmaurice; 1706–1761; 1st Earl of Shelburne, etc.	Baron Nairne	William Feilding; 1697–1775; 5th Earl Denbigh, etc. 4th Earl of Desmond, etc., 4th Baron St. Liz
Marquess of Lansdowne, Earl of Wycombe, and Viscount Calne and Calston, 1784	Baron Keith (1st creation: Ireland), 1797; Baron Keith (2nd creation: UK), 1801; Baron Keith (3rd creation: UK), 1803; Viscount Keith (UK), 1814
Francis Thomas-Fitzmaurice; 1740–1818; 3rd Earl of Kerry, 23rd Baron Kerry	William Petty-Fitzmaurice; 1737–1805; 1st Marquess of Lansdowne, etc., 2nd Earl of Shelburne, etc.	Jane Mercer	George Keith Elphinstone; 1746–1823; Viscount Keith, Baron Keith (Ire, UK, UK)	Basil Feilding; 1719–1800; 6th Earl Denbigh, etc. 5th Earl of Desmond, etc., 5th Baron St. Liz
Viscountcy of Keith and Barony of Keith (1st creation) extinct, 1801
John Henry Petty; 1765–1809; 2nd Marquess of Lansdowne, etc., 3rd Earl of Shelburne, etc.	Henry Petty-Fitzmaurice; 1780–1863; 3rd Marquess of Lansdowne, etc., 4th Earl of Shelburne, etc., 4th Earl of Kerry, 24th Baron Kerry	Margaret Mercer Elphinstone; 1788–1867; Comtesse de Flahaut, 2nd Baroness Keith (Ire, UK), 7th Lady Nairne	William Robert Feilding; 1760–1799 styled Viscount Feilding
Baronies of Keith (2nd & 3rd creations) extinct, 1867
William Thomas Petty-FitzMaurice; 1811–1836 styled Earl of Kerry	Henry Thomas Petty-Fitzmaurice; 1816–1866; 4th Marquess of Lansdowne, etc., 5th Earl of Shelburne, etc., 5th Earl of Kerry, 24th Baron Kerry	Emily Jane Petty-FitzMaurice; 1819–1895; 8th Lady Nairne	William Basil Percy Feilding; 1796–1865; 7th Earl Denbigh, etc. 6th Earl of Desmond, etc., 6th Baron St. Liz
Baron Mersey, 1910; Viscount Mersey, 1916	Baron Fitzmaurice, 1906
John Charles Bigham; 1840–1929; 1st Viscount Mersey, etc.	Henry Charles Keith Petty-Fitzmaurice; 1845–1927; 5th Marquess of Lansdowne, etc., 6th Earl of Shelburne, etc., 6th Earl of Kerry, 24th Baron Kerry, 9th Lord Nairne	Edmond Fitzmaurice; 1846–1935; Baron Fitzmaurice	Rudolph William Basil Feilding ("Rollo"); 1823–1892; 8th Earl Denbigh, etc. 7th Earl of Desmond, etc., 7th Baron St. Liz
Barony of Fitzmaurice extinct, 1935
Charles Clive Bigham; 1872–1956; 2nd Viscount Mersey, etc.	Henry William Edmund Petty-Fitzmaurice; 1872–1936; 6th Marquess of Lansdowne, etc., 7th Earl of Shelburne, etc., 7th Earl of Kerry, 25th Baron Kerry, 10th Lord Nairne	Charles Fitzmaurice; 1874–1914	Rudolph Robert Basil Aloysius Augustine Feilding; 1859–1939; 9th Earl Denbigh, etc. 8th Earl of Desmond, etc., 8th Baron St. Liz
Edward Clive Bigham; 1906–1979; 3rd Viscount Mersey, etc.	Katherine Bigham; 1912–1995; 12th Lady Nairne	Charles Hope Petty-Fitzmaurice; 1917–1944; 7th Marquess of Lansdowne, etc., 8th Earl of Shelburne, etc., 8th Earl of Kerry, 26th Baron Kerry, 11th Lord Nairne	George John Charles Mercer Nairne Petty-Fitzmaurice; 1912–1999; 8th Marquess of Lansdowne, etc., 9th Earl of Shelburne, etc., 9th Earl of Kerry, 27th Baron Kerry	William Rudolph Stephen Feilding; 1912–1966; 10th Earl Denbigh, etc. 9th Earl of Desmond, etc., 9th Baron St. Liz
Richard Maurice Clive Bigham; 1934–2006; 4th Viscount Mersey, etc., 13th Lord Nairne	David Edward Hugh Bigham b. 1938	Charles Maurice Petty-Fitzmaurice b. 1941; 9th Marquess of Lansdowne, etc., 10th Earl of Shelburne, etc., 10th Earl of Kerry, 28th Baron Kerry	William Rudolph Michael Feilding ("Rollo"); 1943–1995; 11th Earl Denbigh, etc. 10th Earl of Desmond, etc., 10th Baron St. Liz
Edward John Hallam Bigham b. 1966; 5th Viscount Mersey, etc., 14th Lord Nairne	Charles Richard Petty Bigham b. 1967 heir presumptive to the Viscountcy of Mersey	Simon Henry George Petty-Fitzmaurice b. 1970 styled Earl of Kerry; heir apparent to the marquessate of Landsdowne, earldoms of Shelburne and Kerry, and the barony of Kerry	Alexander Stephen Rudolph Feilding b. 1970; 12th Earl Denbigh, etc. 11th Earl of Desmond, etc., 11th Baron St. Liz
Flora Bigham b. 2003 styled Mistress of Nairne	George Henry Charles Petty-Fitzmaurice b. 2020 styled Viscount Calne and Calston	Orlando Gregory Danger Feilding b. 2009 styled Viscount Feilding; heir apparent to the earldoms of Denbigh and Desmond and the barony of St. Liz

== Line of succession ==
Line of succession
- George Petty-Fitzmaurice, 8th Marquess of Lansdowne (1912–1999)
  - Charles Petty-Fitzmaurice, 9th Marquess of Lansdowne (born 1941)
    - (1) Simon Petty-Fitzmaurice, Earl of Kerry (born 1970)
      - (2) George Petty-Fitzmaurice, Viscount Calne and Calstone (born 2020)
    - (3) Lord William Petty-Fitzmaurice (born 1973)
  - (4) Lord Robert Mercer Nairne (born 1947)
    - (5) Samuel George Mercer Nairne (born 1976)
      - (6) George Yvan Mercer Nairne (born 2009)
      - (7) Harold Charles Mercer Nairne (born 2011)
    - (8) Joseph Douglas Mercer Nairne (born 1980)
      - (9) Fergus Grey Mercer Nairne (born 2009)
      - (10) Angus John Mercer Nairne (born 2013)

== Middleton connection ==
It was reported in 2012 that the direct descendants of Thomas FitzMaurice, brother of the first Marquess, included brothers Lieut. Osmund Fitzmaurice Bullock and Sir Christopher Bullock and that Sir Christopher's wife, Lady Bullock (née Barbara May Lupton), was a second cousin of Olive Middleton (née Lupton), the great grandmother of the Princess of Wales.

== See also ==
- Edmond Petty-FitzMaurice, 1st Baron FitzMaurice
- Lord Nairne
- Baron Lansdowne
- Earl of Kerry, now a courtesy style (along with Earl of Shelburne) for the heir apparent
- Earl of Orkney, held by the Fitzmaurice family for some generations

== Sources ==
- Hesilrige, Arthur G. M. (1921). Debrett's Peerage and Titles of courtesy. 160A, Fleet street, London: Dean & Son. p. 539.
- Kidd, Charles, Williamson, David (editors). Debrett's Peerage and Baronetage (1990 edition). New York: St Martin's Press, 1990,
- Leigh Rayment's Peerage Pages
