= Baron Keith =

Extinct barony in the Peerage of the United Kingdom

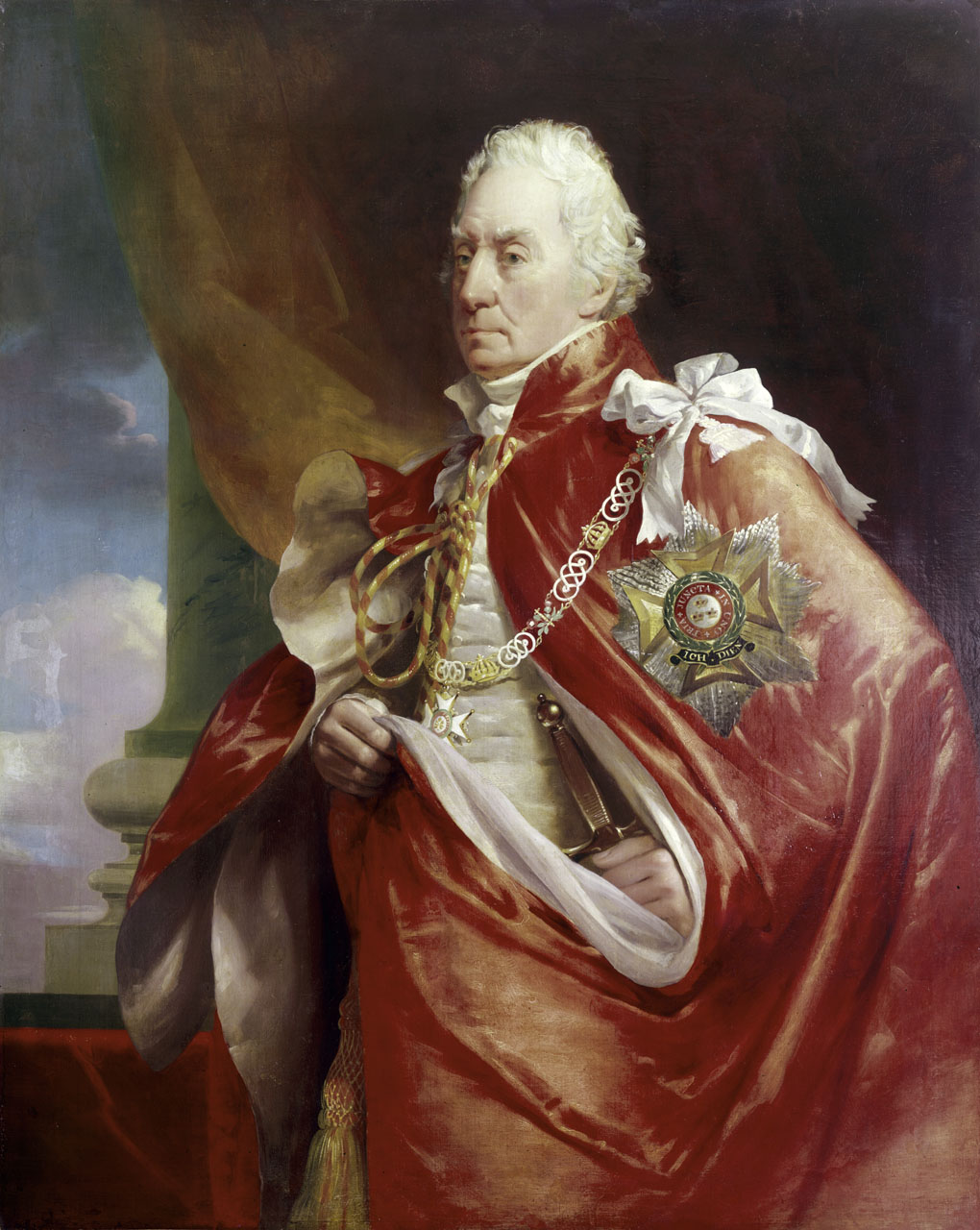
George Elphinstone, 1st Viscount Keith

Baron Keith was a title that was created three times in British history, with all three creations in favour of the same person, Admiral the Honourable Sir George Keith Elphinstone. In 1814 Lord Keith was further honoured when he was made Viscount Keith in the Peerage of the United Kingdom, with normal remainder to heirs male.

== Family tree ==
Lansdowne family tree

Baron Kerry, 1223
Earl of Kerry, 1753
Thomas FitzMaurice; 1668–1741; 1st Earl of Kerry, 21st Baron Kerry
Viscount FitzMaurice and Baron Dunkeron, 1751; Earl of Shelburne (2nd creation), 1753; Baron Wycombe, 1760
William FitzMaurice; 1694–1747; 2nd Earl of Kerry, 22nd Baron Kerry	John Petty-Fitzmaurice; 1706–1761; 1st Earl of Shelburne, Viscount FitzMaurice, Baron Dunkeron, and Baron Wycombe
Marquess of Lansdowne, Earl of Wycombe, and Viscount Calne and Calston, 1784
Francis Thomas-Fitzmaurice; 1740–1818; 3rd Earl of Kerry, 23rd Baron Kerry	William Petty-Fitzmaurice; 1737–1805; 1st Marquess of Lansdowne, Earl of Wycombe, and Viscount Calne and Calston, 2nd Earl of Shelburne, Viscount FitzMaurice, Baron Dunkeron, and Baron Wycombe	Baron Nairne
Baron Keith (1st creation: Ireland), 1797; Baron Keith (2nd creation: UK), 1801; Baron Keith (3rd creation: UK), 1803; Viscount Keith (UK), 1814
John Henry Petty; 1765–1809; 2nd Marquess of Lansdowne, Earl of Wycombe, and Viscount Calne and Calston, 3rd Earl of Shelburne, Viscount FitzMaurice, Baron Dunkeron, and Baron Wycombe	George Keith Elphinstone; 1746–1823; Viscount Keith, Baron Keith (Ire, UK, UK)	Jane Mercer
Viscountcy Keith and Barony Keith (1st creation) extinct, 1801
Henry Petty-Fitzmaurice; 1780–1863; 3rd Marquess of Lansdowne, Earl of Wycombe, and Viscount Calne and Calston, 4th Earl of Shelburne, Viscount FitzMaurice, Baron Dunkeron, and Baron Wycombe; 4th Earl of Kerry, 24th Baron Kerry	Margaret Mercer Elphinstone; 1788–1867; Comtesse de Flahaut, 2nd Baroness Keith (Ire, UK), 7th Lady Nairne
Baronies Keith (2nd & 3rd creations) extinct, 1867
Henry Thomas Petty-Fitzmaurice; 1816–1866; 4th Marquess of Lansdowne, Earl of Wycombe, and Viscount Calne and Calston, 5th Earl of Shelburne, Viscount FitzMaurice, Baron Dunkeron, and Baron Wycombe; 5th Earl of Kerry, 24th Baron Kerry	Emily Jane Petty-FitzMaurice; 1819–1895; 8th Lady Nairne
Baron Mersey, 1910; Viscount Mersey, 1916	Baron Fitzmaurice, 1906
John Charles Bigham; 1840–1929; 1st Viscount Mersey	Henry Charles Keith Petty-Fitzmaurice; 1845–1927; 5th Marquess of Lansdowne, Earl of Wycombe, and Viscount Calne and Calston, 6th Earl of Shelburne, Viscount FitzMaurice, Baron Dunkeron, and Baron Wycombe, 6th Earl of Kerry, 24th Baron Kerry, 9th Lord Nairne	Edmond Fitzmaurice; 1846–1935; Baron Fitzmaurice
Barony Fitzmaurice extinct, 1935
Charles Clive Bigham; 1872–1956; 2nd Viscount Mersey	Henry William Edmund Petty-Fitzmaurice; 1872–1936; 6th Marquess of Lansdowne, Earl of Wycombe, and Viscount Calne and Calston, 7th Earl of Shelburne, Viscount FitzMaurice, Baron Dunkeron, and Baron Wycombe, 7th Earl of Kerry, 25th Baron Kerry, 10th Lord Nairne	Charles Fitzmaurice; 1874–1914
Edward Clive Bigham; 1906–1979; 3rd Viscount Mersey	Katherine Bigham; 1912–1995; 12th Lady Nairne	Charles Hope Petty-Fitzmaurice; 1917–1944; 7th Marquess of Lansdowne, Earl of Wycombe, and Viscount Calne and Calston, 8th Earl of Shelburne, Viscount FitzMaurice, Baron Dunkeron, and Baron Wycombe, 8th Earl of Kerry, 26th Baron Kerry, 11th Lord Nairne	George John Charles Mercer Nairne Petty-Fitzmaurice; 1912–1999; 8th Marquess of Lansdowne, Earl of Wycombe, and Viscount Calne and Calston, 9th Earl of Shelburne, Viscount FitzMaurice, Baron Dunkeron, and Baron Wycombe, 9th Earl of Kerry, 27th Baron Kerry
Richard Maurice Clive Bigham; 1934–2006; 4th Viscount Mersey, 13th Lord Nairne	David Edward Hugh Bigham b. 1938; Heir apparent to the Viscountcy Mersey	Charles Maurice Petty-Fitzmaurice b. 1941; 9th Marquess of Lansdowne, Earl of Wycombe, and Viscount Calne and Calston, 10th Earl of Shelburne, Viscount FitzMaurice, Baron Dunkeron, and Baron Wycombe, 10th Earl of Kerry, 28th Baron Kerry
Edward John Hallam Bigham b. 1966; 5th Viscount Mersey, 14th Lord Nairne	Charles Richard Petty Bigham b. 1967; Heir apparent in the heir presumptive to the Viscountcy Mersey	Simon Henry George Petty-Fitzmaurice b. 1970 styled Earl of Kerry
Flora Bigham, Mistress of Nairne b. 2003 styled Mistress of Nairne	George Henry Charles Petty-Fitzmaurice b. 2020 styled Viscount Calne and Calston

== See also ==
- Lord Elphinstone
- Earl Marischal
- Lord Nairne
