= Earl of Kerry =

Title in the peerage of Ireland

Earldom of Kerry
- Creation date: 1723
- Created by: George I of Great Britain
- Peerage: Peerage of Ireland
- First holder: Thomas Fitzmaurice, 21st Baron Kerry
- Present holder: The 9th Marquess of Lansdowne, who is also 10th Earl of Kerry
- Heir apparent: Simon Petty-Fitzmaurice
- Former seat: Convamore House
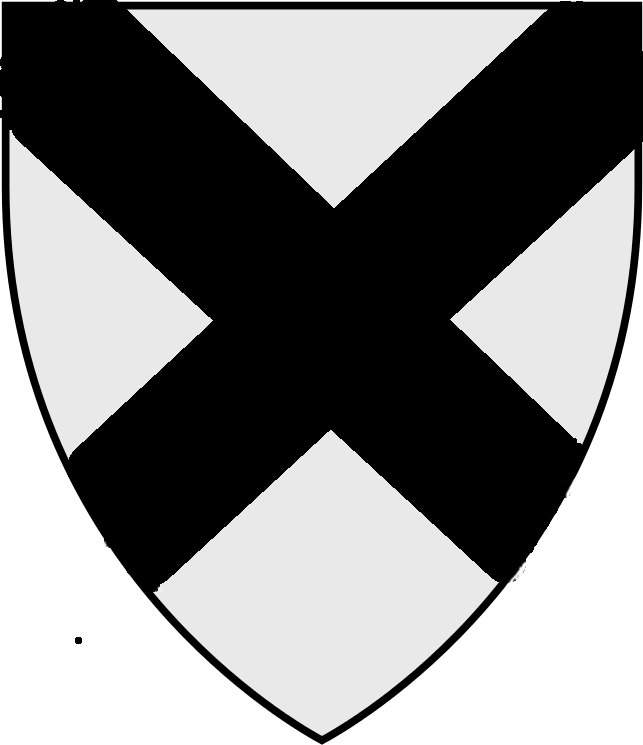
- Arms

Baron Kerry is an ancient title in the Peerage of Ireland, named after County Kerry.

There are differing accounts as to which FitzMaurice was the 1st Baron Kerry. The Complete Peerage starts the numbering at Maurice Fitzthomas. Irish pedigrees starts the numbering at Thomas Fitzmaurice.

In 1325, Maurice FitzMaurice, 4th Baron Kerry, murdered Diarmaid Óg MacCarthy (son of Cormac Mór MacCarthy) in the courtroom at Tralee. For this act, Maurice was tried and attainted by the parliament in Dublin and his lands forfeited, but after his death they were restored to his brother John FitzMaurice, 5th Baron of Kerry.

The title was sometimes given as Baron Lixnaw (after Lixnaw) or Baron Kerry and Lixnaw. In a 1615 dispute with Baron Slane over precedence, it was claimed the title "Baron Lixnaw" was promoted by the rival Earl of Desmond, who wanted "Baron Kerry" to be a courtesy title for his heir. The Privy Council of Ireland's ruling in the dispute referred to Baron Kerry as both "Lo[rd] of Kierry" and "Baron of Kierry and Licksnawe" [sic].

In 1537, the eleventh Baron was created Baron Odorney and Viscount Kilmaule in the Peerage of Ireland. However, these titles became extinct on his death in 1541 while he was succeeded in the Barony of Kerry by his younger brother.

The twenty-first Baron was created Earl of Kerry in the Peerage of Ireland in 1723. His younger son John Petty Fitzmaurice was created the 1st Earl of Shelbourne in the Peerage of Ireland in 1753 and his son William Petty FitzMaurice, the 2nd Earl of Shelburne, who served as British prime minister from 1782 to 1783, was created Marquess of Lansdowne in 1784. In 1818 the latter's son, the third Marquess, succeeded his cousin as 4th Earl of Kerry and 24th Baron Kerry. Earl of Kerry has subsequently been used as a courtesy title by heirs of the Marquess.

== Barons Kerry (1223) ==
- Thomas FitzMaurice, 1st Baron Kerry (c. 1220–1280) According to John O'Hart, his father was Maurice FitzRaymond, the fourth son of Raymond FitzGerald le Gros and Basilia de Clare
- Maurice FitzThomas, 2nd Baron Kerry (d. 1305)
- Nicholas FitzMaurice, 3rd Baron Kerry (d. c. 1332)
- Maurice FitzNicholas, 4th Baron Kerry (d. 1339)
- John FitzNicholas, 5th Baron Kerry (d. c. 1378)
- Maurice FitzJohn FitzMaurice, 6th Baron Kerry (d. 1398)
- Patrick FitzMaurice FitzJohn, 7th Baron Kerry (d. c. 1410)
- Thomas FitzMaurice, 8th Baron Kerry (d. 1469)
- Edmond FitzMaurice, 9th Baron Kerry (d. 1498)
- Edmond FitzMaurice, 10th Baron Kerry (d. 1543) resigned his estates to become a lay brother in Ardfert Abbey
- Edmond Fitzmaurice, 11th Baron Kerry (d. 1541) (created Viscount Kilmaule in 1537)

== Viscounts Kilmaule (1537) ==
- Edmond Fitzmaurice, 1st Viscount Kilmaule (died 1541) (extinct)

== Barons Kerry (1223; Reverted) ==
- Patrick FitzMaurice, 12th Baron Kerry (d. 1547)
- Thomas FitzMaurice, 13th Baron Kerry (d. 1549)
- Edmond FitzMaurice, 14th Baron Kerry (d. 1549)
- Gerard FitzMaurice, 15th Baron Kerry (d. 1550)
- Thomas Fitzmaurice, 16th Baron Kerry (c. 1520–1590)
- Patrick Fitzmaurice, 17th Baron Kerry (c. 1541–1600)
- Thomas Fitzmaurice, 18th Baron Kerry (1574–1630)
- Patrick Fitzmaurice, 19th Baron Kerry (1595–1661)
- William FitzMaurice, 20th Baron Kerry (1633–1697)
- Thomas Fitzmaurice, 21st Baron Kerry (1668–1741) (created Earl of Kerry in 1723)

== Earls of Kerry (1723) ==
- Thomas FitzMaurice, 1st Earl of Kerry (1668–1741)
- William FitzMaurice, 2nd Earl of Kerry (1694–1747)
- Francis Thomas-Fitzmaurice, 3rd Earl of Kerry (1740–1818)
- Henry Petty-Fitzmaurice, 3rd Marquess of Lansdowne, 4th Earl of Kerry (1780–1863)

See Marquess of Lansdowne for further Earls of Kerry.

== Family tree ==
Fitzmaurice family tree and the FitzGerald dynasty
Note that there are differing accounts as to which FitzMaurice was the 1st Baron Kerry. The Complete Peerage starts the numbering at Maurice Fitzthomas. Irish pedigrees starts the numbering at Thomas Fitzmaurice.

Maurice FitzGerald "Maurice de Windsor" c. 1105–c. 1176; Lord of Llanstephan, Baron of Naas, Lord of Maynooth
Robert FitzMaurice; Details unknown	Thomas FitzMaurice FitzGerald c. 1145–1213; Lord OConnello	Gerald FitzMaurice c. 1150–1203; 1st Baron of Offaly
Baron Kerry and Lixnaw, 1223	See Baron of Offaly
Thomas Fitzmaurice c. 1220–1280; 1st Baron Kerry and Lixnaw; Lord OConnello	John FitzThomas d. 1261; 1st Baron Desmond
Maurice Fitzthomas d. c. 1260; 2nd Baron Kerry and Lixnaw	Maurice FitzJohn FitzGerald d. 1261
Nicholas Fitzthomas d. 1324; 3rd Baron Kerry and Lixnaw	Thomas Fitzmaurice FitzGerald d. 1298; 2nd Baron Desmond
Earl of Desmond (1st creation), 1329
Maurice Fitzthomas d. 1339; 4th Baron Kerry and Lixnaw	John Fitzthomas d. 1348; 5th Baron Kerry and Lixnaw	Aveline (Eleanor)	Maurice FitzThomas FitzGerald d. 1358; 1st Earl of Desmond, 4th Baron Desmond	Thomas FitzThomas FitzGerald; 1290–1307; 3rd Baron Desmond
Maurice FitzJohn Fitzmaurice d. 1398; 6th Baron Kerry and Lixnaw	Maurice FitzMaurice FitzGerald "Maurice Óg"; 1335–1398; 2nd Earl of Desmond, 5th Baron Desmond	Gerald FitzGerald; 1335–1398; 3rd Earl of Desmond, 6th Baron Desmond
Patrick FitzMaurice FitzJohn d. c. 1410; 7th Baron Kerry and Lixnaw	John FitzGerald d. 1399; 4th Earl of Desmond, 7th Baron Desmond	James FitzGerald d. 1462; 6th Earl of Desmond, 9th Baron Desmond
Thomas FitzMaurice d. 1469; 8th Baron Kerry and Lixnaw	Thomas FitzGerald c. 1386–1420; 5th Earl of Desmond, 8th Baron Desmond	Thomas FitzJames FitzGerald "the Great Earl" d. c. 1467/68; 7th Earl of Desmond, 10th Baron Desmond
Edmond FitzMaurice d. 1541; 9th Baron Kerry and Lixnaw	James fitz Thomas FitzGerald; 1459–1487; 8th Earl of Desmond, 11th Baron Desmond	Maurice fitz Thomas FitzGerald d. 1520; 9th (or 10th) Earl of Desmond, 12th Baron Desmond	Thomas fitz Thomas FitzGerald; 1454–1534; 11th (or 12th) Earl of Desmond, 14th Baron Desmond	John fitz Thomas FitzGerald d. 1536; 12th Earl of Desmond de facto, 15th Baron Desmond de facto
Thomas FitzMaurice; Details unknown	James fitz Maurice FitzGerald d. 1529; 10th (or 11th) Earl of Desmond, 13th Baron Desmond	Maurice fitz Thomas FitzGerald d. 1529	James fitz John FitzGerald d. 1558; 13th (or 14th) Earl of Desmond, 16th Baron Desmond
Edmond FitzMaurice d. 1543; 10th Baron Kerry and Lixnaw	Joan Fitzgerald d. 1565	James fitz Maurice FitzGerald ("Court Page") d. 1540; 12th (or 13th) Earl of Desmond de jure, 15th Baron Desmond de jure
Barony of Kerry and Lixnaw resigned, 1529
Baron Odorney and Viscount Kilmaule, 1537
Edmond FitzMaurice d. 1541; 11th Baron Kerry and Lixnaw	Patrick FitzMaurice d. 1547; 12th Baron Kerry and Lixnaw	Gerard FitzMaurice d. 1550; 15th Baron Kerry and Lixnaw	Thomas Fitzmaurice; 1502–1590; 16th Baron Kerry and Lixnaw	Margaret "the Fair"	Thomas Butler ("Black Tom") c. 1531–1614; Earl of Ormond and Earl of Ossory	Gerald FitzGerald ("Rebel Earl") c. 1533–1583; 14th (or 15th or 16th) Earl of Desmond, 17th Baron Desmond
Barony of Odorney and viscountcy of Kilmaule extinct, 1541	Earldom of Desmond (1st creation) attainted, 1582
Lord Dingwall (2nd creation), 1609; Earl of Desmond (3rd creation) and Baron Dunmore, 1619	Earl of Desmond (2nd creation for life), 1600
Thomas FitzMaurice d. 1549; 13th Baron Kerry and Lixnaw	Edmond FitzMaurice d. 1549; 14th Baron Kerry and Lixnaw	Patrick Fitzmaurice; 1551?–1600; 17th Baron Kerry and Lixnaw	Richard Preston d. 1628; Earl of Desmond and Baron Dunmore, 1st Lord Dingwall	Elizabeth (Butler) Preston c. 1585–1628	James FitzGerald ("Tower Earl"); 1571–1601; Earl of Desmond
Viscount Feilding and Baron Feilding, 1620; Earl of Denbigh, 1622	Earldom of Desmond (3rd creation) and barony of Dunmore extinct, 1628	Earldom of Desmond (2nd creation) extinct, 1601
Thomas Fitzmaurice; 1574–1630; 18th Baron Kerry	William Feilding c. 1587–1643; 1st Earl of Denbigh, etc.
Baron St. Liz, 1664	Viscount Callan and Baron Feilding of Lecagh, 1622; Earl of Desmond (4th creation) on reversion, 1628
Patrick FitzMaurice; 1595–1661; 19th Baron Kerry	Basil Feilding c. 1608–1675; 2nd Earl Denbigh, etc., 1st Baron St. Liz	George Feilding c. 1614–1665; 1st Earl of Desmond, etc.	Earldom of Desmond created in expectation of marriage, which did not happen	Elizabeth (Preston) Butler; 1615–1684; 2nd Lady Dingwall suo jure
William FitzMaurice; 1633–1697; 20th Baron Kerry	William Feilding; 1640–1685; 3rd Earl Denbigh, etc. 2nd Earl of Desmond, etc., 2nd Baron St. Liz	Thomas Butler; 1634–1680; Earl of Ossory
Earl of Kerry, 1753
Thomas FitzMaurice; 1668–1741; 1st Earl of Kerry, 21st Baron Kerry	Basil Feilding; 1668–1717; 4th Earl Denbigh, etc. 3rd Earl of Desmond, etc., 3rd Baron St. Liz	James Butler; 1665–1745; Duke of Ormonde, Earl of Ossory, 3rd Lord Dingwall
Lordship of Dingwall (2nd creation) forfeit, 1715
Viscount FitzMaurice and Baron Dunkeron, 1751; Earl of Shelburne (2nd creation), 1753; Baron Wycombe, 1760
William FitzMaurice; 1694–1747; 2nd Earl of Kerry, 22nd Baron Kerry	John Petty-Fitzmaurice; 1706–1761; 1st Earl of Shelburne, etc.	Baron Nairne	William Feilding; 1697–1775; 5th Earl Denbigh, etc. 4th Earl of Desmond, etc., 4th Baron St. Liz
Marquess of Lansdowne, Earl of Wycombe, and Viscount Calne and Calston, 1784	Baron Keith (1st creation: Ireland), 1797; Baron Keith (2nd creation: UK), 1801; Baron Keith (3rd creation: UK), 1803; Viscount Keith (UK), 1814
Francis Thomas-Fitzmaurice; 1740–1818; 3rd Earl of Kerry, 23rd Baron Kerry	William Petty-Fitzmaurice; 1737–1805; 1st Marquess of Lansdowne, etc., 2nd Earl of Shelburne, etc.	Jane Mercer	George Keith Elphinstone; 1746–1823; Viscount Keith, Baron Keith (Ire, UK, UK)	Basil Feilding; 1719–1800; 6th Earl Denbigh, etc. 5th Earl of Desmond, etc., 5th Baron St. Liz
Viscountcy of Keith and Barony of Keith (1st creation) extinct, 1801
John Henry Petty; 1765–1809; 2nd Marquess of Lansdowne, etc., 3rd Earl of Shelburne, etc.	Henry Petty-Fitzmaurice; 1780–1863; 3rd Marquess of Lansdowne, etc., 4th Earl of Shelburne, etc., 4th Earl of Kerry, 24th Baron Kerry	Margaret Mercer Elphinstone; 1788–1867; Comtesse de Flahaut, 2nd Baroness Keith (Ire, UK), 7th Lady Nairne	William Robert Feilding; 1760–1799 styled Viscount Feilding
Baronies of Keith (2nd & 3rd creations) extinct, 1867
William Thomas Petty-FitzMaurice; 1811–1836 styled Earl of Kerry	Henry Thomas Petty-Fitzmaurice; 1816–1866; 4th Marquess of Lansdowne, etc., 5th Earl of Shelburne, etc., 5th Earl of Kerry, 24th Baron Kerry	Emily Jane Petty-FitzMaurice; 1819–1895; 8th Lady Nairne	William Basil Percy Feilding; 1796–1865; 7th Earl Denbigh, etc. 6th Earl of Desmond, etc., 6th Baron St. Liz
Baron Mersey, 1910; Viscount Mersey, 1916	Baron Fitzmaurice, 1906
John Charles Bigham; 1840–1929; 1st Viscount Mersey, etc.	Henry Charles Keith Petty-Fitzmaurice; 1845–1927; 5th Marquess of Lansdowne, etc., 6th Earl of Shelburne, etc., 6th Earl of Kerry, 24th Baron Kerry, 9th Lord Nairne	Edmond Fitzmaurice; 1846–1935; Baron Fitzmaurice	Rudolph William Basil Feilding ("Rollo"); 1823–1892; 8th Earl Denbigh, etc. 7th Earl of Desmond, etc., 7th Baron St. Liz
Barony of Fitzmaurice extinct, 1935
Charles Clive Bigham; 1872–1956; 2nd Viscount Mersey, etc.	Henry William Edmund Petty-Fitzmaurice; 1872–1936; 6th Marquess of Lansdowne, etc., 7th Earl of Shelburne, etc., 7th Earl of Kerry, 25th Baron Kerry, 10th Lord Nairne	Charles Fitzmaurice; 1874–1914	Rudolph Robert Basil Aloysius Augustine Feilding; 1859–1939; 9th Earl Denbigh, etc. 8th Earl of Desmond, etc., 8th Baron St. Liz
Edward Clive Bigham; 1906–1979; 3rd Viscount Mersey, etc.	Katherine Bigham; 1912–1995; 12th Lady Nairne	Charles Hope Petty-Fitzmaurice; 1917–1944; 7th Marquess of Lansdowne, etc., 8th Earl of Shelburne, etc., 8th Earl of Kerry, 26th Baron Kerry, 11th Lord Nairne	George John Charles Mercer Nairne Petty-Fitzmaurice; 1912–1999; 8th Marquess of Lansdowne, etc., 9th Earl of Shelburne, etc., 9th Earl of Kerry, 27th Baron Kerry	William Rudolph Stephen Feilding; 1912–1966; 10th Earl Denbigh, etc. 9th Earl of Desmond, etc., 9th Baron St. Liz
Richard Maurice Clive Bigham; 1934–2006; 4th Viscount Mersey, etc., 13th Lord Nairne	David Edward Hugh Bigham b. 1938	Charles Maurice Petty-Fitzmaurice b. 1941; 9th Marquess of Lansdowne, etc., 10th Earl of Shelburne, etc., 10th Earl of Kerry, 28th Baron Kerry	William Rudolph Michael Feilding ("Rollo"); 1943–1995; 11th Earl Denbigh, etc. 10th Earl of Desmond, etc., 10th Baron St. Liz
Edward John Hallam Bigham b. 1966; 5th Viscount Mersey, etc., 14th Lord Nairne	Charles Richard Petty Bigham b. 1967 heir presumptive to the Viscountcy of Mersey	Simon Henry George Petty-Fitzmaurice b. 1970 styled Earl of Kerry; heir apparent to the marquessate of Landsdowne, earldoms of Shelburne and Kerry, and the barony of Kerry	Alexander Stephen Rudolph Feilding b. 1970; 12th Earl Denbigh, etc. 11th Earl of Desmond, etc., 11th Baron St. Liz
Flora Bigham b. 2003 styled Mistress of Nairne	George Henry Charles Petty-Fitzmaurice b. 2020 styled Viscount Calne and Calston	Orlando Gregory Danger Feilding b. 2009 styled Viscount Feilding; heir apparent to the earldoms of Denbigh and Desmond and the barony of St. Liz
