= Viscount Mersey =

Viscountcy in the Peerage of the United Kingdom

Viscountcy of Mersey
- Blazon: Quarterly: 1st and 4th grandquarters: Per bend dancetty Azure and Or a Bend invected between three Crosses Patée in chief and as many Horseshoes in base all counterchanged (Bigham);2nd grandquarter:1st and 4th, Ermine, on a Bend Azure, a Magnetic Needle, pointing to the Polar Star Or (Petty); 2nd and 3rd, Argent, a Saltire Gules, and a Chief, Ermine (FitzMaurice); 3rd grandquarter: 1st, Parted per pale Sable and Argent on a Chaplet four Quatrefoils counterchanged (Nairne); 2nd counterquartered: 1st and 4th, Or on a Fess Gules between three Crosses Patée in chief of the second a Mullet Azure in base three Bezants (Mercer); 2nd and 3rd, Argent a Chevron Sable between three Boars' Heads erased Gules (Elphinstone); 3rd counterquartered: 1st and 4th, Paly of six Or and Sable (Atholl); 2nd, Or a Fess chequy Azure and Argent (Stewart); 3rd, Azure three Mullets Argent within a Double Tressure flory counterflory Or (Murray); 4th, Argent three Martlets Sable (de Flahault).
- Creation date: 22 January 1916
- Peerage: Peerage of the United Kingdom
- First holder: John Charles Bigham, 1st Viscount Mersey
- Present holder: Edward John Hallam Bigham, 5th Viscount Mersey
- Heir presumptive: Hon. David Edward Hugh Bigham
- Seat: Bignor Park
- Motto: I Advance

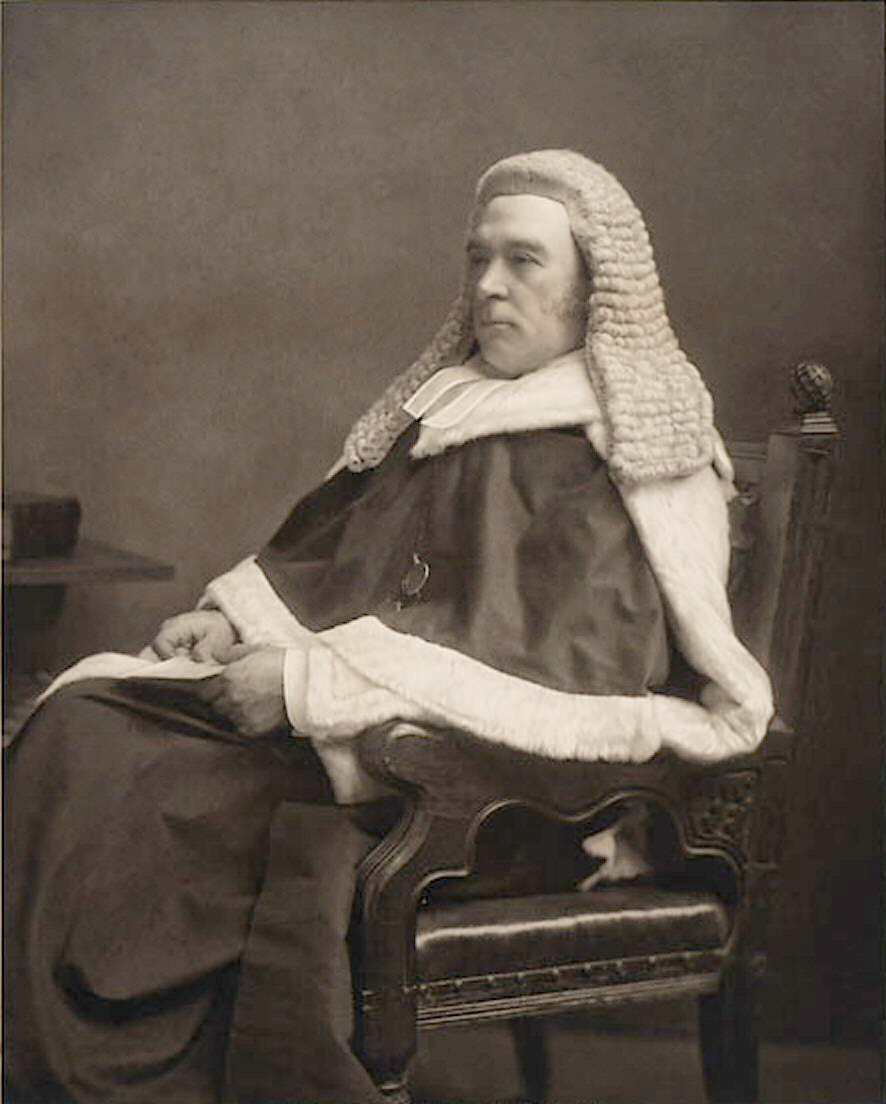
John Bigham, 1st Viscount Mersey.

Viscount Mersey, of Toxteth in the County Palatine of Lancaster, is a title in the Peerage of the United Kingdom. It was created in 1916 for the lawyer and politician John Bigham, 1st Baron Mersey. He had already been created Baron Mersey, of Toxteth in the County Palatine of Lancaster, in 1910, also in the Peerage of the United Kingdom. His son, the second Viscount, was a Deputy Speaker of the House of Lords and also served as Liberal Chief Whip in the House of Lords from 1944 to 1949. His son, the third Viscount, married Katherine Petty-Fitzmaurice, 12th Lady Nairne, the eldest daughter of Henry Petty-Fitzmaurice, 6th Marquess of Lansdowne and 10th Lord Nairne. They were both succeeded by their son, the fourth Viscount Mersey and thirteenth Lord Nairne. As of 2017 the titles are held by the latter's son, the fifth Viscount, who succeeded in 2006.

The family seat is Bignor Park, near Pulborough in Sussex.

== Viscounts Mersey (1916) ==
- John Charles Bigham, 1st Viscount Mersey (1840–1929)
- Charles Clive Bigham, 2nd Viscount Mersey (1872–1956)
- Edward Clive Bigham, 3rd Viscount Mersey (1906–1979)
- Richard Maurice Clive Bigham, 4th Viscount Mersey (1934–2006)
- Edward John Hallam Bigham, 5th Viscount Mersey (b. 1966)

The heir presumptive (to the Mersey but not Nairne titles) is the present holder's cousin Charles Richard Petty Bigham (b. 1967).

== Family tree ==
Lansdowne family tree

Baron Kerry, 1223
Earl of Kerry, 1753
Thomas FitzMaurice; 1668–1741; 1st Earl of Kerry, 21st Baron Kerry
Viscount FitzMaurice and Baron Dunkeron, 1751; Earl of Shelburne (2nd creation), 1753; Baron Wycombe, 1760
William FitzMaurice; 1694–1747; 2nd Earl of Kerry, 22nd Baron Kerry	John Petty-Fitzmaurice; 1706–1761; 1st Earl of Shelburne, Viscount FitzMaurice, Baron Dunkeron, and Baron Wycombe
Marquess of Lansdowne, Earl of Wycombe, and Viscount Calne and Calston, 1784
Francis Thomas-Fitzmaurice; 1740–1818; 3rd Earl of Kerry, 23rd Baron Kerry	William Petty-Fitzmaurice; 1737–1805; 1st Marquess of Lansdowne, Earl of Wycombe, and Viscount Calne and Calston, 2nd Earl of Shelburne, Viscount FitzMaurice, Baron Dunkeron, and Baron Wycombe	Baron Nairne
Baron Keith (1st creation: Ireland), 1797; Baron Keith (2nd creation: UK), 1801; Baron Keith (3rd creation: UK), 1803; Viscount Keith (UK), 1814
John Henry Petty; 1765–1809; 2nd Marquess of Lansdowne, Earl of Wycombe, and Viscount Calne and Calston, 3rd Earl of Shelburne, Viscount FitzMaurice, Baron Dunkeron, and Baron Wycombe	George Keith Elphinstone; 1746–1823; Viscount Keith, Baron Keith (Ire, UK, UK)	Jane Mercer
Viscountcy Keith and Barony Keith (1st creation) extinct, 1801
Henry Petty-Fitzmaurice; 1780–1863; 3rd Marquess of Lansdowne, Earl of Wycombe, and Viscount Calne and Calston, 4th Earl of Shelburne, Viscount FitzMaurice, Baron Dunkeron, and Baron Wycombe; 4th Earl of Kerry, 24th Baron Kerry	Margaret Mercer Elphinstone; 1788–1867; Comtesse de Flahaut, 2nd Baroness Keith (Ire, UK), 7th Lady Nairne
Baronies Keith (2nd & 3rd creations) extinct, 1867
Henry Thomas Petty-Fitzmaurice; 1816–1866; 4th Marquess of Lansdowne, Earl of Wycombe, and Viscount Calne and Calston, 5th Earl of Shelburne, Viscount FitzMaurice, Baron Dunkeron, and Baron Wycombe; 5th Earl of Kerry, 24th Baron Kerry	Emily Jane Petty-FitzMaurice; 1819–1895; 8th Lady Nairne
Baron Mersey, 1910; Viscount Mersey, 1916	Baron Fitzmaurice, 1906
John Charles Bigham; 1840–1929; 1st Viscount Mersey	Henry Charles Keith Petty-Fitzmaurice; 1845–1927; 5th Marquess of Lansdowne, Earl of Wycombe, and Viscount Calne and Calston, 6th Earl of Shelburne, Viscount FitzMaurice, Baron Dunkeron, and Baron Wycombe, 6th Earl of Kerry, 24th Baron Kerry, 9th Lord Nairne	Edmond Fitzmaurice; 1846–1935; Baron Fitzmaurice
Barony Fitzmaurice extinct, 1935
Charles Clive Bigham; 1872–1956; 2nd Viscount Mersey	Henry William Edmund Petty-Fitzmaurice; 1872–1936; 6th Marquess of Lansdowne, Earl of Wycombe, and Viscount Calne and Calston, 7th Earl of Shelburne, Viscount FitzMaurice, Baron Dunkeron, and Baron Wycombe, 7th Earl of Kerry, 25th Baron Kerry, 10th Lord Nairne	Charles Fitzmaurice; 1874–1914
Edward Clive Bigham; 1906–1979; 3rd Viscount Mersey	Katherine Bigham; 1912–1995; 12th Lady Nairne	Charles Hope Petty-Fitzmaurice; 1917–1944; 7th Marquess of Lansdowne, Earl of Wycombe, and Viscount Calne and Calston, 8th Earl of Shelburne, Viscount FitzMaurice, Baron Dunkeron, and Baron Wycombe, 8th Earl of Kerry, 26th Baron Kerry, 11th Lord Nairne	George John Charles Mercer Nairne Petty-Fitzmaurice; 1912–1999; 8th Marquess of Lansdowne, Earl of Wycombe, and Viscount Calne and Calston, 9th Earl of Shelburne, Viscount FitzMaurice, Baron Dunkeron, and Baron Wycombe, 9th Earl of Kerry, 27th Baron Kerry
Richard Maurice Clive Bigham; 1934–2006; 4th Viscount Mersey, 13th Lord Nairne	David Edward Hugh Bigham b. 1938; Heir apparent to the Viscountcy Mersey	Charles Maurice Petty-Fitzmaurice b. 1941; 9th Marquess of Lansdowne, Earl of Wycombe, and Viscount Calne and Calston, 10th Earl of Shelburne, Viscount FitzMaurice, Baron Dunkeron, and Baron Wycombe, 10th Earl of Kerry, 28th Baron Kerry
Edward John Hallam Bigham b. 1966; 5th Viscount Mersey, 14th Lord Nairne	Charles Richard Petty Bigham b. 1967; Heir apparent in the heir presumptive to the Viscountcy Mersey	Simon Henry George Petty-Fitzmaurice b. 1970 styled Earl of Kerry
Flora Bigham, Mistress of Nairne b. 2003 styled Mistress of Nairne	George Henry Charles Petty-Fitzmaurice b. 2020 styled Viscount Calne and Calston

== Works ==
- Mersey (Viscount), Charles Clive Bigham (1901). A Year in China, 1899-1900. Macmillan and Company, limited.

== See also ==
- Lord Nairne
