= Thomas Fitzmaurice =

Thomas Fitzmaurice or Thomas FitzMaurice may refer to:

- Thomas Fitzmaurice, 16th Baron Kerry (1502–1590), Irish baron
- Thomas Fitzmaurice, 18th Baron Kerry (1574–1630), his grandson, Irish military leader in the Nine Years' War
- Thomas FitzMaurice, 1st Earl of Kerry (1668–1741), his great-grandson, Irish peer and politician
- Thomas Fitzmaurice (MP) (1742–1793), his grandson, Member of Parliament for Calne, and for Chipping Wycome
- Thomas FitzMaurice, 5th Earl of Orkney (1803–1877), his grandson
- Tom Fitzmaurice (1898–1977), Australian rules footballer
