= Charles Petty-Fitzmaurice =

Charles Petty-Fitzmaurice may refer to:

- Lord Charles Petty-Fitzmaurice (1874–1914), English soldier and courtier
- Charles Petty-Fitzmaurice, 7th Marquess of Lansdowne (1917–1944), British peer
- Charles Petty-Fitzmaurice, 9th Marquess of Lansdowne (born 1941), British peer
