= Robert Waller (Chipping Wycombe MP) =

British politician

Robert Waller (c 1732–1814), was a British politician who sat in the House of Commons for 29 years from 1761 to 1790.

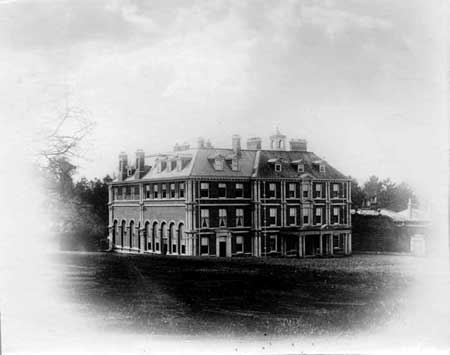
Hall Barn, Buckinghamshire

Waller was the son of Edmund Waller, MP of Beaconsfield and his wife Mary Aislabie, daughter of John Aislabie and the brother of MPs John Waller and Edmund Waller. He was possibly educated at Eton College from 1742 to 1748 and matriculated at Oriel College, Oxford aged 18 on 11 June 1751.

In the 1761 general election Waller was returned unopposed as Member of Parliament for Chipping Wycombe on his family interest. He was returned unopposed at all his subsequent elections in 1768, 1774, 1780 and 1784. He was Groom of the Bedchamber from 1784 to 1801.

Waller lived at Hall Barn, near Beaconsfield in Buckinghamshire and died unmarried in October or November 1814.

Parliament of Great Britain
Preceded by Viscount FitzMaurice; Edmund Waller	Member of Parliament for Chipping Wycombe; 1761–1790; With: Viscount FitzMaurice 1761; Isaac Barré 1761-1774; Hon. Thomas FitzMaurice 1774-1780; Viscount Mahon 1780-1786; Earl Wycombe 1786-1790	Succeeded by Earl Wycombe; Rear-Admiral Sir John Jervis
