= Patrick Fitzmaurice =

Irish noble

The Lord Kerry
- Born: 1551
- Died: 1600 (aged 48–49)
- Title: 17th Baron Kerry
- Spouse: Joan Fermoy
- Children: 5 (including Thomas Fitzmaurice, 18th Baron Kerry)
- Parent(s): Thomas Fitzmaurice, 16th Baron Kerry; Margaret FitzJohn

Patrick Fitzmaurice, 17th Baron Kerry and Baron Lixnaw (1551?–1600), was an Irish nobleman, politician, and peer. He was the son and heir of Thomas Fitzmaurice, 16th Baron Kerry.

Fitzmaurice was sent at an early age into England as a pledge of his father's loyalty. When he had attained the age of twenty he was allowed by Elizabeth to return to Ireland. In 1580 he joined in the rebellion of the Earl of Desmond, but shortly afterwards with his brother Edmund was surprised and confined to the castle of Limerick. In August 1581 he managed to escape with the connivance, it was suspected, of his gaoler, John Sheriff, clerk of the ordnance. In September 1582 he was reported to have gone to Spain with the catholic bishop of Killaloe; but he was in January 1583 wounded at the Dingle, and in April 1587 captured and committed to Dublin Castle.

In 1588 Sir William Herbert made a laudable effort to procure his release, offering to pawn his bond to the uttermost value of his land and substance for his loyal and dutiful demeanour, ‘knowing him to be of no turbulent disposition'. He was, however, opposed by St. Leger and Fitzwilliam, and despite a loving attempt on the part of his wife to obtain his freedom he remained in prison until 1591–2. During the last great rebellion that convulsed Ireland in Elizabeth's reign he, perhaps more from compulsion than free choice, threw in his lot with the rebels; but the evident ruin that confronted him and the loss of his castle of Lixnaw so affected him that he died shortly afterwards, August 1600. He was buried with his uncle Donald, earl of Clancar, in the Grey Friary of Irrelaugh in Desmond. He married Joan or Jane, daughter of David, Viscount Fermoy, and by her had three sons, Thomas, who became 18th Baron Kerry, Gerald, and Maurice, and two daughters, Joan and Eleanor.

Peerage of Ireland
Preceded by Thomas Fitzmaurice	Baron Kerry; 1590–1600	Succeeded by Thomas Fitzmaurice
