= Bignor Park =

Country house in Bignor, West Sussex, England

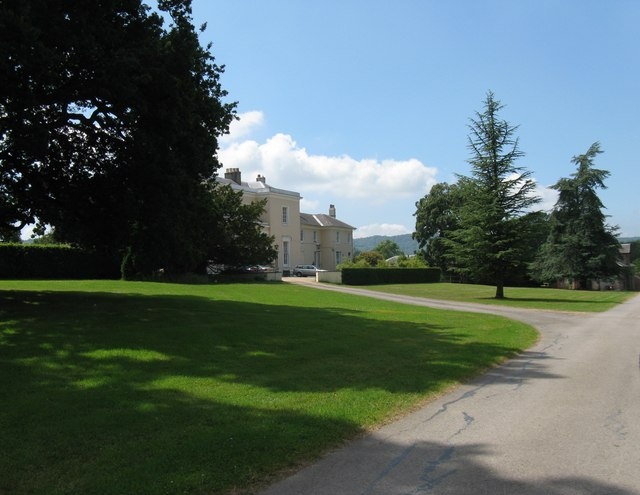

- Location within West Sussex

General information
- Status: Grade II listed
- Architectural style: Neoclassical
- Location: Near Bignor, West Sussex grid reference SU 991 156, Bignor Park House; Pulborough; West Sussex RH20 1HG, United Kingdom
- Coordinates: 50°55′52″N 0°35′26″W
- Completed: 1829

Design and construction
- Architect: Henry Harrison

Website
- www.bignorpark.co.uk

Bignor Park is a privately owned country house and estate near the village of Bignor, in West Sussex, England, on the edge of the South Downs. The house is a Grade II listed building.

== Description ==
=== History ===
The original house was built by Richard Pellatt of Steyning, who bought the estate in 1584; before then it was a deer park held by the Earls of Arundel. It was bought in 1712 by Nicholas Turner. His descendant Charlotte Turner Smith (1749–1806), the poet and novelist, spent some of her childhood here.

In 1806 the Cornish mine-owner John Hawkins bought the estate. A new house, designed by Henry Harrison in Neoclassical style, was built from 1826 to 1829, and the parkland was landscaped by William Sawrey Gilpin.

During the First World War Mrs Josephine Johnstone, a descendant of John Hawkins, established a Red Cross hospital in the house. It had 55 beds by 1917, and Mrs Johnstone received an OBE in 1918.

Bignor Park was bought in 1926 by Clive Bigham, 2nd Viscount Mersey. The present owner is Edward John Hallam Bigham, 5th Viscount Mersey: the composer Ned Bigham.

=== House and estate ===
The estate is of 1,100 acres (450 ha). As of 2020 the house is a venue for weddings, parties and corporate events, and it is possible for groups to visit the house and gardens on a private tour.

Bignor Park houses a small collection of ancient Greek antiquities.

== See also ==
- Viscount Mersey
