= William FitzMaurice, 20th Baron Kerry =

Irish nobleman, politician, and peer

The Lord Kerry
- Born: 1633
- Died: 1696/97
- Title: 20th Baron Kerry
- Spouse: Constance Long
- Children: Thomas FitzMaurice, 1st Earl of Kerry
- Parent(s): Patrick Fitzmaurice, 19th Baron Kerry; Honore Fitzgerald

William FitzMaurice, 20th Baron Kerry (1633–1696/97) was an Irish nobleman, politician, and peer. He was the son of Patrick Fitzmaurice, 19th Baron Kerry and Honore Fitzgerald, daughter of Sir Edmund Fitzgerald, Knight of Cloyne.

He married Constance Long (died 12 October 1685), daughter of William Long, and was the father of Thomas Fitzmaurice, 21st Baron and 1st Earl of Kerry.

Peerage of Ireland
Preceded by Patrick Fitzmaurice	Baron Kerry; 1661–96/97	Succeeded by Thomas Fitzmaurice
