= Thomas Fitzmaurice, 16th Baron Kerry =

Irish nobleman and politician (1502–1590)

The Lord Kerry
- Born: 1502
- Died: 1590 (aged 87–88)
- Title: 16th Baron Kerry
- Spouse(s): Margaret FitzJohn (1st), Catherine MacCarthy Môr (2nd), Penelope O'Brien (3rd)
- Children: 4 (including Patrick Fitzmaurice, 17th Baron Kerry)
- Parent(s): Edmond Fitzmaurice, 10th Baron Kerry; Una MacMahon

Thomas Fitzmaurice, 16th Baron Kerry and Baron Lixnaw (1502–1590) was an Irish nobleman, politician, and peer.

== Life ==
He was the youngest son of Edmond Fitzmaurice, 10th Baron Kerry, and Una, daughter of Teige MacMahon. He was made heir to the ancestral estates in Clanmaurice, by the death of his elder brothers and their heirs, he owed his knowledge of that event to the fidelity of his old nurse, Joan Harman, who together with her daughter, made her way from Dingle to Milan, where he was serving in the imperial army. On his return, he found his inheritance contested by a certain John fitz Richard, who however, surrendered it in 1552. He was confirmed in his estate by Mary, and on 20 December 1589 executed a deed settling it on his son Patrick and heirs male, remainder to his own right heirs.

He is said to have sat in the parliament of 1556, and in March 1567 he was knighted by Sir Henry Sidney. His conduct during the rebellion of James FitzMaurice FitzGerald (1569–73) was suspicious, but he appears to have regained the confidence of the government, being commended by Sidney on the occasion of his visit to Munster in 1576. Like most of the would-be independent chiefs in that province, he complained bitterly of the aggressions of Gerald FitzGerald, 14th Earl of Desmond. Charged by Sir William Pelham with conniving at that earl's rebellion, he grounded his denial on the ancient and perpetual feud that had existed between his house and the head of the Geraldines. His sons Patrick and Edmund, who had openly joined the rebels, were surprised and incarcerated in Limerick Castle.

On 3 September 1581, he and the Earl of Clancare presented themselves before the deputy at Dublin:

in all their bravery. And the best robe or garment they wore was a russet Irish mantle worth about a crown apiece, and they had each of them a hat, a leather jerkin, a pair of hosen which they called trews, and a pair of brogues, but not all worth a noble that either of them had

Two months previously (23 July), he had given pledges of his loyalty to Captain Zouche, but in May 1582 we read that after killing Captain Acham and some soldiers he went into rebellion, whereupon his pledges were hanged by Zouche. His position indeed was intolerable, what with the "oppressions" of the rebels and the "heavy cesses" of the government. The Earl of Ormonde mediated for him, and in May 1583 he was pardoned. He sat in the parliament of 1585–6, but he seems to have been regarded with suspicion till his death on 16 December 1590.

He was buried in the tomb of Bishop Philip Stack, in the cathedral of Ardfert, Zouche refusing to allow his burial in the tomb of his ancestors in the abbey, which then served as a military station.

== Family ==
He married, first Margaret, "the fair", second daughter of James FitzGerald, 13th Earl of Desmond (died 1558), by whom he had Patrick Fitzmaurice, who became the 17th Baron Kerry, Edmund, killed at Kinsale, Robert, slain in the isles of Arran, and one daughter; secondly, Catherine, only daughter and heir of Teige MacCarthy Môr; thirdly, Penelope, daughter of Sir Donald O'Brien, brother of Conor, third earl of Thomond.

== Legacy ==
He is said to have been the handsomest man of his age, and of such strength that within a few months of his death not more than three men in Kerry could bend his bow. "He was", says the Four Masters, "the best purchaser of wine, horses, and literary works of any of his wealth and patrimony in the greater part of Leath-Mogha at that time" (Lodge (Archdall); Annals of Four Masters, s. a. 1590).

== Notes ==
Peerage of Ireland
Preceded by Gerard Fitzmaurice	Baron Kerry; 1550–1590	Succeeded by Patrick Fitzmaurice
