= Francis Thomas-Fitzmaurice, 3rd Earl of Kerry =

Francis Thomas-Fitzmaurice, 3rd Earl of Kerry (9 September 1740 – 4 July 1818) was an Irish peer. He was the heir to a great inheritance, but his extravagance led to the loss of all his Irish estates.

== Biography ==
He was the only son of William Fitzmaurice, 2nd Earl of Kerry, and Lady Gertrude Lambart, daughter of Richard Lambart, 4th Earl of Cavan and Margaret Trant. His father died when he was only seven and he became a Ward in Chancery. He was educated at Trinity College Dublin where he took his degree of Bachelor in Arts in 1758 and Master in Arts in 1759.

In 1768 he married Anastasia Daly, younger daughter and co-heiress of Peter Daly of Queensbury, County Galway. She obtained a divorce by Act of Parliament from her first husband (who was also her cousin), Charles Daly of Loughrea, in order to marry Lord Kerry. The Kerry marriage caused much comment, most of it adverse: apart from the decision to divorce her previous husband, a step which was still felt by many in polite society to be scandalous, Anastasia was much older than her husband, socially she was not his equal, and she was a Roman Catholic. Like her husband she was extravagant, and she was blamed by his family for her husband's disastrous financial losses. Nonetheless, the inscription which he had placed on her tomb in Westminster Abbey makes it clear that he never regretted marrying her: it states that for 31 years she made him the happiest of mankind, due to her "charity, benevolence, truth, sincerity, meekness and simplicity".

Others who knew the couple took a more jaundiced view: Horace Walpole called Lord Kerry "a simple young Irish peer that has married an elderly Irishwoman, who was divorced on his account, and wasted a vast estate on the idlest ostentation". The Earl's cousin, whose son was his heir, William Petty, 2nd Earl of Shelburne wrote uncharitably that "he fell in love with a married lady twenty years older than himself, the daughter of an eminent Roman Catholic lawyer, and she having obtained a divorce, married her; [she was] an extraordinarily vain person. Having their way to fight up into good society, and having no children, they sold every acre of land that had been in our family since Henry II's time".

Lady Kerry died on 9 April 1799. Her husband died in 1818 and was buried in the same tomb in Westminster Abbey. He had no children and the title became an additional title of the Marquess of Lansdowne, descendants of his uncle John Petty, 1st Earl of Shelburne.

Peerage of Ireland
Preceded by William Fitzmaurice	Earl of Kerry; 1747–1818	Succeeded by Henry Petty-Fitzmaurice
