= Richard Bigham, 4th Viscount Mersey =

British peer and Conservative politician

Richard Maurice Clive Bigham, 4th Viscount Mersey, (8 July 1934 – 5 August 2006) was a British peer, Conservative politician, and convicted child sexual abuser.

== Background ==
Richard Bigham was the eldest son of the 3rd Viscount Mersey, Edward Clive Bigham, and the 12th Lady Nairne, Katherine Evelyn Constance Petty-Fitzmaurice Bigham. Bigham attended secondary school at Eton College and studied at Balliol College, Oxford. On 6 May 1961, Richard Bigham married Joanna Dorothy Corsica Grey Murray, daughter of John Arnaud Robin Grey Murray, descendants of the noted publisher John Murray. They had a son, Ned. Bigham and his family lived at Bignor Park and in Notting Hill.

== Career ==
Bigham was a lieutenant in the Irish Guards from 1952 to 1954. He later became a documentary film maker, his 1968 documentary on bilharzia The Threat in the Water winning the BAFTA award for a specialised film, and was president of a number of organisations. He wrote two books: The Hills of Cork and Kerry (1987) and Pole Power (2001).

== Politics ==
Bigham became the 4th Baron Mersey and the 4th Viscount Mersey upon the death of his father on 2 August 1979. He succeeded to the Lordship of Nairne upon the death of his mother on 20 October 1995. He became a Conservative Party peer on 11 November 1980 and remained in the House of Lords until 11 November 1999, when his hereditary seat was abolished with the enactment of the House of Lords Act 1999.

Viscount Mersey contributed to debate in the Lords when, towards the late 1980s, Liverpool's Toxteth area (from where his title was taken) was home to around 40,000 black residents, who he described, in a debate on the inner-cities, as living in "the worst conditions that I have come across in this country", suggesting also that it was not possible to make a living as a retailer as all the shops were derelict or run–down.

== Child sexual abuse conviction ==
In 2025, Bigham was featured on an episode of the BBC Radio crime documentary In Dark Corners. The piece discussed his criminal conviction for sexual offences against two children aged 6 and 10 in 1978. He was given a 12-month jail sentence, suspended for 2 years. His crimes were also mentioned by Alex Renton in a 2025 article in The Times on the pro-paedophilia group Paedophile Information Exchange (PIE). Bigham was a member of PIE. In spite of Bigham's crimes, he was able to join the House of Lords and become a member of the Conservative party.

== Death ==
Bigham died at home of cancer on 5 August 2006, at the age of 72. He is buried at Holy Cross Churchyard in Bignor, West Sussex. He left an estate of more than £25 million.

Peerage of the United Kingdom
Preceded by Edward Clive Bigham	Viscount Mersey; 1979–2006	Succeeded by Edward Bigham, 5th Viscount Mersey
