= John Petty, 2nd Marquess of Lansdowne =

British politician

The Most Honourable The Marquess of Lansdowne
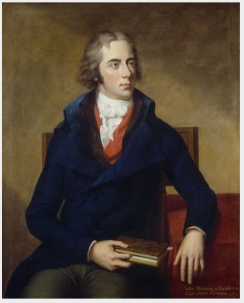

2nd Marquess of Lansdowne
- In office 1805–1809
- Preceded by: William Petty
- Succeeded by: Henry Petty-Fitzmaurice

Member of the British Parliament for Wycombe
- In office 1786–1802

Personal details
- Born: 6 December 1765 London, England
- Died: 15 November 1809 (aged 43)
- Spouse: Maria Arabella Gifford Maddock
- Parents: William Petty, 2nd Earl of Shelburne (father); Lady Sophia Carteret (mother)

John Henry Petty, 2nd Marquess of Lansdowne (6 December 1765 – 15 November 1809), known as Earl Wycombe between 1784 and 1805, was a British Whig politician who in Ireland was suspected of complicity in a republican conspiracy.

In 1786, his father, the former British Prime Minister Lord Shelbourne, secured him an English seat in the House of Commons. After witnessing revolutionary events in Paris, he began to establish an independent reputation as a friend of reform, critical of the war with France and of the suppression of democratic agitation at home. In 1797 he repaired to his father's estates in Ireland where his political associations brought him under government surveillance.

After the United Irish rebellion of 1798, he was seen in the company of Robert Emmet and his confederates and was suspected by the Irish administration of being party to his plans in 1803 for a rising in Dublin. Assured of his liberty by the Irish Chief Secretary, William Wickham, who privately confessed to his own sympathy for Emmet and his cause, Petty retired in ill health to England where, in possession of his father's title Marquess of Lansdowne, he died aged 43.

== Early life ==
Petty was born in London, the eldest son of William Petty, 2nd Earl of Shelburne, and Lady Sophia Carteret, daughter of John Carteret, 2nd Earl Granville. He was baptised on the day of his birth at St George's, Hanover Square in Mayfair.

== Disaffected Whig MP ==
His father was the British Prime Minister who in 1782 acknowledged the independence of the Irish Parliament, and the independence of the United States in 1783. His father fell out of favour after this, but was elevated as Marquess of Lansdowne in 1784.

Petty was educated at Christ Church, Oxford, matriculating in 1783 aged 17, graduating M.A. in 1785.

In 1786, Petty, now with the courtesy title of Earl Wycombe, returned to the Commons from his father's old seat, Chipping Wycombe. While he urged his son to "take a manly part in politics, be it aristocrat or democrat", "Wycombe" was frustrated by his continued dependence on his father's favour. He befriended Jeremy Bentham who, in 1798, described Wycombe as a man who had "begun to feel his ground by taking some novel propositions". He escaped his father's supervision by travelling in the winter of 1789–90 to the continent, where he experienced the first reverberations of the French Revolution. In 1791, he visited the new American republic and then journeyed to Paris where he witnessed the humiliation of the King following his Flight to Varennes.

Wycombe began to establish an independent reputation on his return to England late in 1792, joining Charles Fox as an outspoken critic of his father's former protégé, William Pitt, now Tory prime minister. Dismissing talk of an imminent insurrection, he decried the government's suppression of democratic agitation. He did acquiesce in a motion for an inquiry into the radical corresponding societies, but claimed to be "much inclined to defend those who are desirous of obtaining a parliamentary reform".

Citing ill health, Wycombe left again in 1794, travelling for three years in Italy and Switzerland. In 1797 he returned for a confrontation with his father to whom, he was later to remark, there was "scarcely an error or misfortune" in his life that he did not trace. It was agreed that he should survey the family estates in Ireland with a view to reaching a suitable resettlement of property and left England at the end of April. In his final interventions in the Commons he arraigned ministerial policy since the outbreak of war, and pleaded for a conciliatory policy toward Ireland (on the eve of the 1798 rebellion he wrote to Frances Stewart, Marchioness of Londonderry that it was "impossible to carry liberality for Ireland too far"). He was not again to appear in the House, but resigned his seat only at the dissolution of 1802.

== Party to the Emmet conspiracy ==
Wycombe established himself at Sandymount, outside Dublin. From there, over the next five years, he kept Fox and the British whigs informed of Irish affairs. Among his sources were United Irishmen. Despairing of parliamentary reform in Ireland and in the hope of French assistance, under the leadership of the scion of another leading Anglo-Irish family, Edward Fitzgerald, they were preparing a republican insurrection. Such were Petty's associations that, according to one account, "the government thought it necessary to inform his lordship that if he did not quit Ireland he would be taken up". Despite the threat Petty remained.

To Henry Vassall-Fox, Lord Holland, Petty reported on the martial-law reign of terror that marked the suppression of the United Irish risings in the summer of 1798: pillaging, floggings and summary executions. Travelling on the road into Dublin he himself was fired upon by a soldier.

Wycombe is one a number of "persons of respectability" that the early historian of the United Irishmen, Richard Madden, records as subsequently coming under the "usual power of fascinating" exercised by Robert Emmet. Emmet had constituted a new United Irish directory and was renewing contacts not only with Paris but also (as advertised in the Despard Plot) with radical groups in Britain. James Hope, one of Emmet's principal lieutenants, recalls seeing Wycombe at rebel arms depot in Marshall Lane in Dublin and had no doubt that Petty was "privy to the plans for insurrection while they were carrying on at the [arms] depot at Thomas Street." It was here that, in July 1803, Emmet's men felt obliged to make a stand after an accidental explosion at a third depot, in Patrick Street, exposed their designs.

After the aborted rising, Wycombe offered to help Hope, escape the country. But he also felt to be himself exposed. On 10 December 1803, he wrote to the Irish Chief Secretary William Wickham asking if a warrant of arrest had been issued in his name and was relieved to discover that this was "utterly unfounded". Francis Higgins was determined that Wycombe be unmasked as a covert traitor, informing Wickham that while, at its climax, Wycombe became "timorous and retreated", he had "entered deep into the virus of the conspiracy". Wickham may have believed it was impolitic to prosecute the son and heir of a former British prime minister on limited evidence, but Chief Secretary had his own sympathies. When he gave his assurance to Wycombe, Wickham was on the point of resigning. To friends, he declared that had he been an Irishman, he "should most unquestionably have joined" Emmet, convinced the object had been to save Ireland from "a state of depression and humiliation".

== Last years ==
Returning to Britain, Wycombe succeeded his father as Marquess of Lansdowne on 7 May 1805. Immediately he married his latest mistress, Maria Arabella Gifford (née Maddock), the daughter of Rev. Hinton Maddox and widow of Duke Gifford of Castle Jordan, County Meath; they had no children. Wycombe spent his final years at Southampton, where he offered the government, now facing the growing empire of Napoleon, his support.

From 1797 until his death, Wycombe maintained a regular correspondence with Frances Stewart, Marchioness of Londonderry. She was the daughter of Charles Pratt, 1st Earl Camden, who had served in his father's ministry; the sister of the Viceroy in Dublin, 1st Marquess of Camden, John Pratt; and by her own account (writing to her friend, the United Irishwoman Jane Greg) a "republican countess". Wycombe's letters to Lady Frances reveal that he continued to entertain criticism of government policy in Ireland, including the Acts of Union 1800 (which her step son, Lord Castlereagh, helped push though the Irish Parliament); of the Anglican church establishment with its tithes levied atop rack rents; of the Navigation Acts; and of religion ("a bad substitute for common sense").

On his death in 1809, he was succeeded as Marquess of Lansdowne by his half-brother Henry Petty-Fitzmaurice, who in the ministry of "All the Talents" under Lord Grenville had three years previously been made Chancellor of the Exchequer at the age of twenty-five.

== Arms ==
Coat of arms of John Petty, 2nd Marquess of Lansdowne
Coronet A Coronet of a Marquess Crest 1st, a beehive beset with bees, diversely volant, proper; 2nd, a centaur drawing a bow and arrow, proper, the part from the waist argent. Escutcheon Quarterly : 1st and 4th Ermine, on a bend, azure a magnetic needle pointing at a polar star, or, (Petty); 2nd and 3rd Argent, a saltier, gules, a chief, ermine (Fitzmaurice). Supporters Two pegasi, ermine.; bridled, crined, winged, and unguled, or, each charged on the shoulder with a fienr-de-lis, azure. Motto Virtute non verbis (By courage, not words).

Parliament of Great Britain
Preceded by Viscount Mahon with Robert Waller 1780–1786	Member of Parliament for Wycombe with Robert Waller 1786–1790 with Sir John Jervis 1790–1794; 1786–1802; With: Sir Francis Baring 1794–1796; Sir John Dashwood-King 1796–1802	Succeeded by Sir Francis Baring, Bt with Sir John Dashwood-King 1802–1806
Peerage of Great Britain
Preceded by William Petty-FitzMaurice	Marquess of Lansdowne; 1805–1809	Succeeded by Henry Petty-FitzMaurice
Preceded by William Petty-FitzMaurice	Earl of Shelburne; 1805–1809	Succeeded by Henry Petty-FitzMaurice
