= Thomas Fitzmaurice, 18th Baron Kerry =

16th and 17th-century Irish baron

Thomas Fitzmaurice
- Baron Kerry
- Tenure: –1630
- Predecessor: Patrick Fitzmaurice, 17th Baron Kerry
- Successor: Patrick Fitzmaurice, 19th Baron Kerry
- Born: 1574
- Died: 3 June 1630; Drogheda
- Spouses: Honora O'Brien; Gyles Power
- Issue Detail: Patrick Fitzmaurice, 19th Baron Kerry & others
- Father: Patrick Fitzmaurice, 17th Baron Kerry
- Mother: Joan Roche

Thomas Fitzmaurice, 18th Baron Kerry (1574–1630), also called Baron Lixnaw, fought in the Nine Years' War.

== Birth and origins ==
Thomas was born in 1574, probably at Lixnaw, the eldest son of Patrick Fitzmaurice, 17th Baron Kerry and his wife Joan (Jane) Roche. His father was the 17th Baron of Kerry. His father's like his mother's family were Old English. Thomas's mother was a daughter of David Roche, 5th Viscount Fermoy.

== Desmond rebellion ==
Fitzmaurice followed his father into rebellion in 1598. After the death of his father in August 1600 and the capture of Listowel Castle by Sir Charles Wilmot in November, he found himself excluded by name from all pardons offered to the rebels. He went north, and negotiated for aid with Hugh O'Neill, 2nd Earl of Tyrone and Hugh Roe Ó Donnell. Finding that he was elusive, Queen Elizabeth expressed her willingness that he should be dealt with by pardon of his life only. But by that time he had managed to raise twelve galleys, and felt no inclination to submit.

After the repulse of the northern army from Thomond in November 1601, he was driven to seek safety. In February 1603 an attempt was made to entrap him by Captain Boys, but without success. On 26 October 1603 Sir Richard Boyle noted that he was still operating actively in Munster, but with a small force, and was trying to find pardon from the new king, James I. His application was more than successful, for he obtained a regrant of all the lands possessed by his father. His son and heir, however, was taken away from him and brought up with Donogh O'Brien, 4th Earl of Thomond as a Protestant.

In later life he became involved in disputes. He sat in the Irish parliament of 1615, when a quarrel arose between him and Lords Slane and Courcy over a question of precedency, which was ultimately decided in his favour. He promised his son a jointure on his marriage, but either from inability or unwillingness refused to fulfil his promise. The son complained, and the father was arrested and placed in the Fleet Prison. After a short period of restraint he appears to have agreed to fulfil his contract, and was allowed to return home. Again disdaining to acknowledge the bond, and falling under suspicion of treason, he was rearrested and conveyed to London. He was allowed to return to Ireland, dying at Drogheda on 3 June 1630. He was buried at Cashel, in the chapel and tomb of St. Cormac.

== First marriage and children ==
Fitzmaurice married, first, Honora, daughter of Connor O'Brien, 3rd Earl of Thomond.

Thomas and Honora had two sons:

1. Patrick Fitzmaurice, 19th Baron Kerry, his heir
2. Gerald, died young

—and one daughter:

1. Joan

== Second marriage ==
Fitzmaurice married secondly, Gyles (Julia), daughter of Richard Power, 4th Baron Power, of Curraghmore.

Thomas and Gyles had five sons:

1. Edmond, colonel, married Helen, the 5th daughter of Charles MacCarthy, 1st Viscount of Muskerry
2. Garret, colonel, married Lucia Tuchet, daughter of Mervyn Tuchet, 2nd Earl of Castlehaven
3. Thomas, who married Ellen, daughter of David Roche, 7th Viscount Fermoy and widow of Donal MacCarthy Reagh and of Charles MacCarthy, 1st Viscount Muskerry
4. Robert, a colonel in the army of King Charles I
5. Richard, a colonel in the army of King Charles I, who fell in the "Battle of Newbury"; however it is not clear whether this is the First Battle of Newbury in 1643, or the Second Battle of Newbury in 1644.

—and three daughters:

1. Catherine, who married John FitzGerald of Inishmore, Knight of Kerry.
2. Margaret, who married 1st Walter Birmingham of Dunfert, 2ndly to John Bourke, Lord Brittas, and 3rdly to Charles More.
3. Mary, who married first Patrick Purcell of Croagh

== Sources ==
- Burke, Bernard (1866). A Genealogical History of the Dormant, Abeyant, Forfeited and Extinct Peerages of the British Empire (New ed.). London: Harrison. OCLC 11501348.
- Dunlop, Robert (1889). "Fitzmaurice, Thomas, eighteenth Lord Kerry and Baron Lixnaw (1574–1630)". In Lee, Sidney (ed.). Dictionary of National Biography. Vol. 19. New York: MacMillan and Co. pp. 185–186. OCLC 8544105.
- Lodge, John (1789). Archdall, Mervyn (ed.). The Peerage of Ireland or, A Genealogical History of the Present Nobility of that Kingdom. Vol. 2. Dublin: James Moore. OCLC 264906028. – Earls

Attribution

Peerage of Ireland
| Preceded by Patrick Fitzmaurice | Baron Kerry; 1630–1661 | Succeeded by Patrick Fitzmaurice |
