= John Bigham, 1st Viscount Mersey =

British lawyer, judge and politician (1840–1929)

The Right Honourable The Viscount Mersey PC
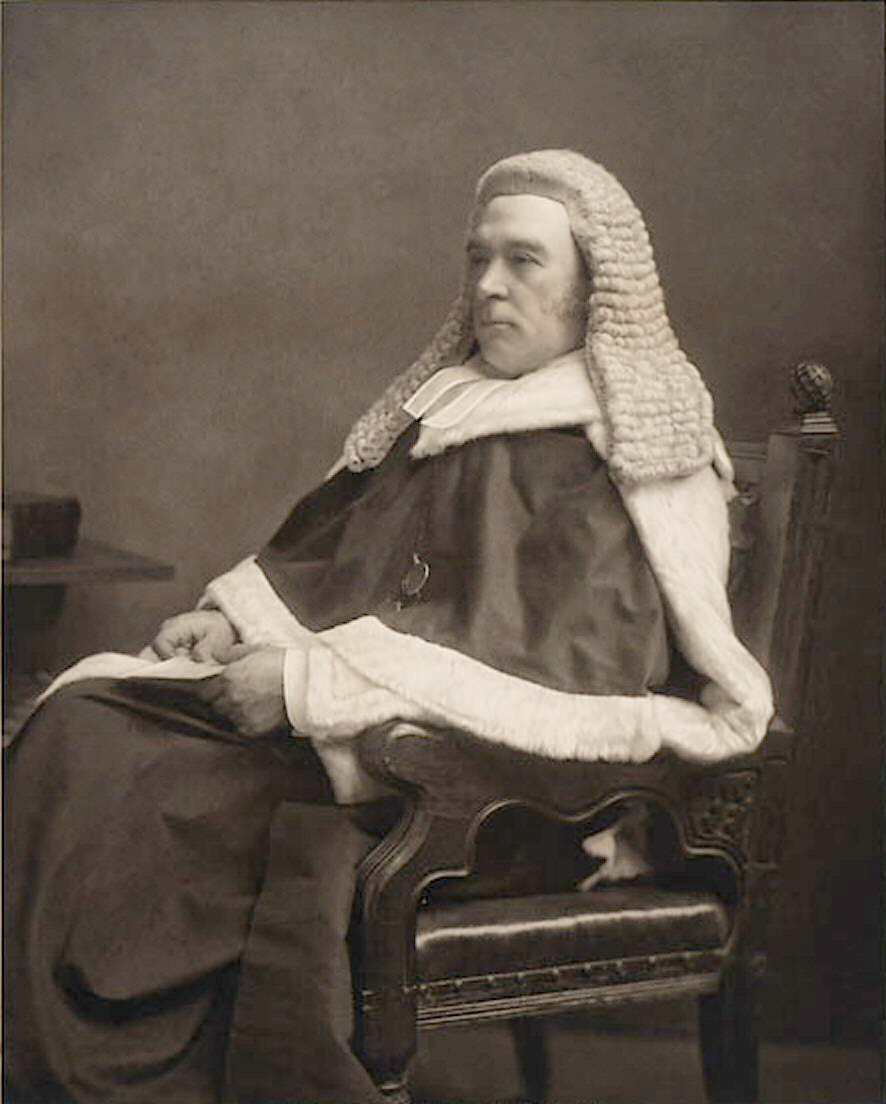
- Lord Mersey

President of the Probate, Divorce and Admiralty Division
- In office 10 February 1909 – 4 March 1910
- Preceded by: Sir Gorell Barnes
- Succeeded by: Sir Samuel Evans

Justice of the High Court
- In office 1897 – 10 February 1909

Member of Parliament for Liverpool Exchange
- In office 7 August 1895 – 10 November 1897
- Preceded by: Ralph Neville
- Succeeded by: Charles McArthur

Personal details
- Born: 3 August 1840 Liverpool, Lancashire, England
- Died: 3 September 1929 (aged 89) Littlehampton, Sussex, England
- Party: Liberal; Liberal Unionist Party
- Spouse: Georgina Sarah Rogers (m. 1871; died 1925)
- Children: 3, including Clive and Trevor

John Charles Bigham, 1st Viscount Mersey PC (3 August 1840 – 3 September 1929) was a British jurist and politician. After early success as a lawyer and a less successful spell as a politician, he was appointed a judge and worked in commercial law.

After his retirement, Mersey remained active in public affairs and is probably best remembered for heading the official Board of Trade inquiries into the sinking of steamships, most notably RMS Titanic, RMS Lusitania, and Falaba, which gave rise to the Thrasher incident. He also chaired the inquiry under the Canada Shipping Act into the sinking of RMS Empress of Ireland.

== Early life ==
Bigham was born in Liverpool, the second son of John Bigham, a prosperous merchant, and his wife, Helen, née East. He was educated at the Liverpool Institute High School for Boys, and the University of London, where he studied law.

Bigham left the university without taking a degree. He then travelled to Berlin and Paris to continue his education. Called to the bar in 1870 by the Middle Temple, he practised commercial law in and around his native city. On 17 August 1871 he married Georgina Sarah Rogers, also from Liverpool. The first of their three sons, Charles Clive Bigham (2nd Viscount Mersey), was born in 1872.

== Barrister and judge ==
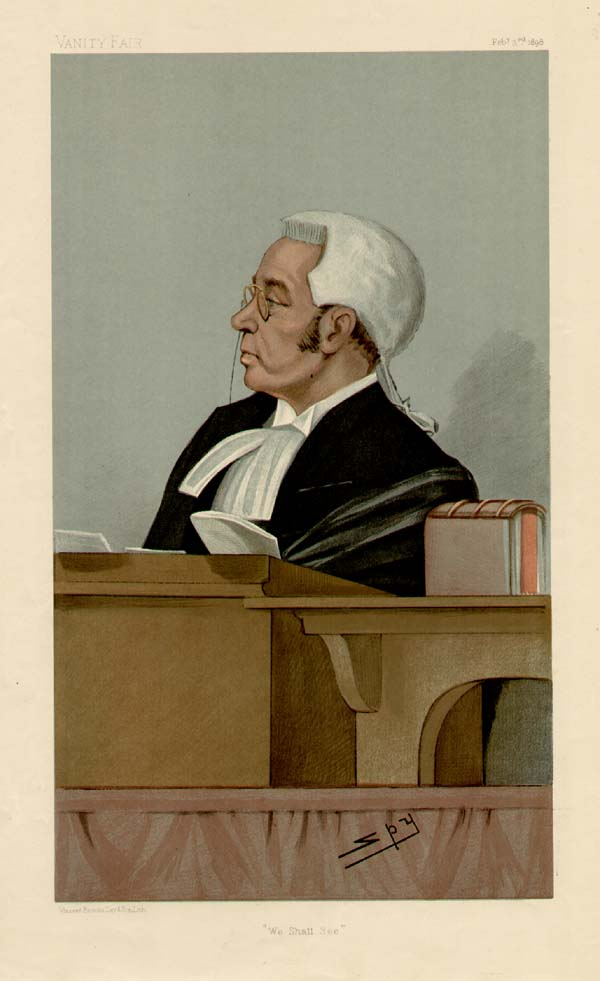
Bigham caricatured by Spy for Vanity Fair, 1898

In 1883, Bigham was named a Queen's Counsel. His commercial practice prospered. In 1885, he tried his hand at politics, standing as a Liberal candidate for Parliament at the Liverpool constituency of East Toxteth, but lost. In 1892, he stood unsuccessfully in another Liverpool seat, the Exchange constituency. He was finally elected at his third attempt in 1895, when he stood as a Liberal Unionist.

He was never able to make a great political impact, and his interest in politics was less than that in his legal work, which continued to flourish. During his last decade as a barrister, he was so in demand that he became one of the richest lawyers in his circle.

In October 1897, Bigham was named a judge to the Queen's Bench, continuing his work in business law, and disqualifying him being an MP. He was knighted the following month.

He was president of the Railway and Canal Commission, worked in the bankruptcy courts and reviewed courts-martial sentences that were handed down during the Second Boer War. He was appointed President of the Probate, Divorce and Admiralty Division in 1909 but found the divorce work unfulfilling and retired in 1910. He was raised to the peerage as Baron Mersey, of Toxteth in the County Palatine of Lancaster, the same year.

== Maritime law ==
In 1912, Mersey received his greatest fame when he was appointed by Lord Loreburn, the Lord Chancellor in the government of H. H. Asquith, to head the inquiry commission into the sinking of RMS Titanic. There was some criticism of his handling of the inquiry. Some felt that he was biased towards the Board of Trade and the major shipping concerns and cared too little about finding out why the ship sank. In 1998, the historian Daniel Butler described Mersey as "autocratic, impatient and not a little testy" but noted the "surprising objectivity" of the inquiry's findings. However, Peter Padfield later concluded that there had been "crazy deductions, distortions, prejudice, and occasional bone-headed obstinacy of witnesses and the court".

In 1913, Mersey presided over the International Convention for the Safety of Life at Sea and added three more maritime inquiries to his résumé with his heading of the inquiries into the sinkings of RMS Empress of Ireland (held in Canada in 1914) and Falaba and the wartime RMS Lusitania in 1915. About the last, Mersey is among those suspected by conspiracy theorists of a cover-up. His biographer Hugh Mooney wrote that such suspicions are wholly conjectural, but "the conclusion of the inquiry (which blamed Germany for the tragedy without reservation) was without doubt politically convenient".

During the first part of the war, Mersey also worked in the Prize Courts, adjudicating seized cargo from the British blockade. This included the cases of the Wilhelmina (1915), the Roumanian (1916), and the Odessa (1916). Mersey was raised in the peerage from baron to viscount that year.

== Later life ==
In his later years, Mersey was beset by deafness, but continued to work actively and returned to the bench in his eighties when the divorce courts had a heavy backlog. Mooney writes that "he helped to clear the lists with all his old efficiency". His wife died in 1925, and he died four years later at Littlehampton in Sussex, aged 89.

Mersey's third son, and second surviving was Trevor Bigham, who became Deputy Commissioner of Police of the Metropolis. His first son, Charles Clive Bigham, survived the sinking of the passenger ship Persia in 1915.

== Portrayals ==
- Tom Chadbon (2012) - Save Our Souls: The Titanic Inquiry (TV film)

== Notes ==
Parliament of the United Kingdom
Preceded by Ralph Neville	Member of Parliament for Liverpool Exchange; 1895–1897	Succeeded by Charles McArthur
Peerage of the United Kingdom
New creation	Viscount Mersey; 1916–1929	Succeeded by Charles Clive Bigham
New creation	Baron Mersey; 1910–1929	Succeeded by Charles Clive Bigham
