= Charles Petty-Fitzmaurice, 7th Marquess of Lansdowne =

British nobleman

The Most Honourable The Marquess of Lansdowne
- Born: 9 January 1917
- Died: 20 August 1944 (aged 27); Italy
- Father: Henry Petty-FitzMaurice
- Military career
- Rank: Captain
- Unit: Royal Wiltshire Yeomanry
- Wars: World War II

Charles Hope Petty-Fitzmaurice, 7th Marquess of Lansdowne (9 January 1917 – 20 August 1944) was a British nobleman and peer. He was the son of Henry Petty-FitzMaurice, 6th Marquess of Lansdowne.

He died aged 27, in Italy, killed in action during the Second World War. Captain Charles Hope Fitzmaurice Lansdowne served with the Royal Wiltshire Yeomanry, Royal Armoured Corps and died on 20 August 1944. Lord Lansdowne was unmarried and childless, and his titles passed to his cousin, George Petty-Fitzmaurice, as his younger brother had also been killed in action in Normandy nine days earlier.

The Scottish title Lord Nairne, however, passed to his elder sister Katherine Evelyn Constance Petty-Fitzmaurice (1912–1995).

== Arms ==
Coat of arms of Charles Petty-Fitzmaurice, 7th Marquess of Lansdowne
Coronet A Coronet of a Marquess Crest 1st, a beehive beset with bees, diversely volant, proper; 2nd, a centaur drawing a bow and arrow, proper, the part from the waist argent. Escutcheon Quarterly : 1st and 4th Ermine, on a bend, azure a magnetic needle pointing at a polar star, or, (Petty); 2nd and 3rd Argent, a saltier, gules, a chief, ermine (Fitzmaurice). Supporters Two pegasi, ermine.; bridled, crined, winged, and unguled, or, each charged on the shoulder with a fienr-de-lis, azure. Motto Virtute non verbis (By courage, not words).

Peerage of Great Britain
Preceded by Henry Petty-Fitzmaurice	Marquess of Lansdowne; 1936–1944	Succeeded by George Petty-Fitzmaurice
Peerage of Scotland
Preceded by Henry Petty-Fitzmaurice	Lord Nairne; 1936–1944	Succeeded by Katherine Bigham
