= William FitzMaurice, 2nd Earl of Kerry =

Irish noble

The Right Honourable William FitzMaurice PC (Ire)
- Earl of Kerry
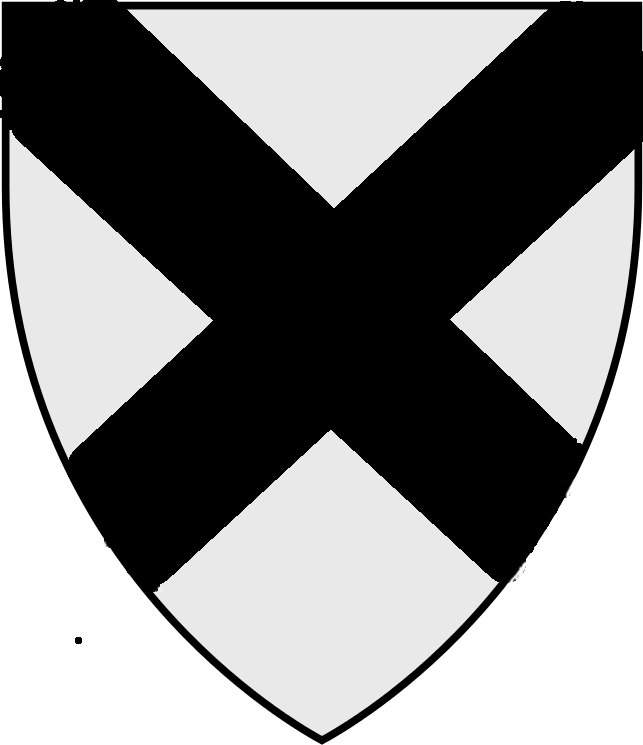
- Coat of arms
- Tenure: 1741–1747
- Predecessor: Thomas FitzMaurice, 1st Earl of Kerry
- Successor: Francis Thomas-Fitzmaurice, 3rd Earl of Kerry
- Born: 1694
- Died: 4 April 1747 (aged 52–53); Lixnaw
- Spouse: Lady Gertrude Lambart (m. 1738)
- Issue: Francis Thomas-Fitzmaurice, 3rd Earl of Kerry; Lady Anna Maria FitzMaurice
- Father: Thomas FitzMaurice, 1st Earl of Kerry
- Mother: Anne Petty

William FitzMaurice, 2nd Earl of Kerry PC (Ire) (1694 – 4 April 1747) was a British Army officer and peer.

He was the eldest son of Thomas FitzMaurice, 1st Earl of Kerry and Anne Petty. In 1738, he married Lady Gertrude Lambart, daughter of Richard Lambart, 4th Earl of Cavan, and had a son, Francis Thomas-Fitzmaurice, 3rd Earl of Kerry (1740–1818), and a daughter Anna Maria, who married Maurice FitzGerald, 16th Knight of Kerry.

On 23 June 1716, he was commissioned a captain in the 2nd Regiment of Foot Guards (ranking as lieutenant-colonel in the Army), but resigned in January 1717/8. He later became Governor of Ross Castle. He was also a Privy Counsellor in Ireland and Custos Rotulorum of Kerry (1746–1747).

The Earl of Kerry died in 1747 in Lixnaw. His wife, Gertrude, died in 1775 and was buried at St James's Church, Piccadilly, on 17 November.

Peerage of Ireland
Preceded by Thomas FitzMaurice	Earl of Kerry; 1741–1747	Succeeded by Francis Thomas-FitzMaurice
