= Clive Bigham, 2nd Viscount Mersey =

British peer and Liberal politician

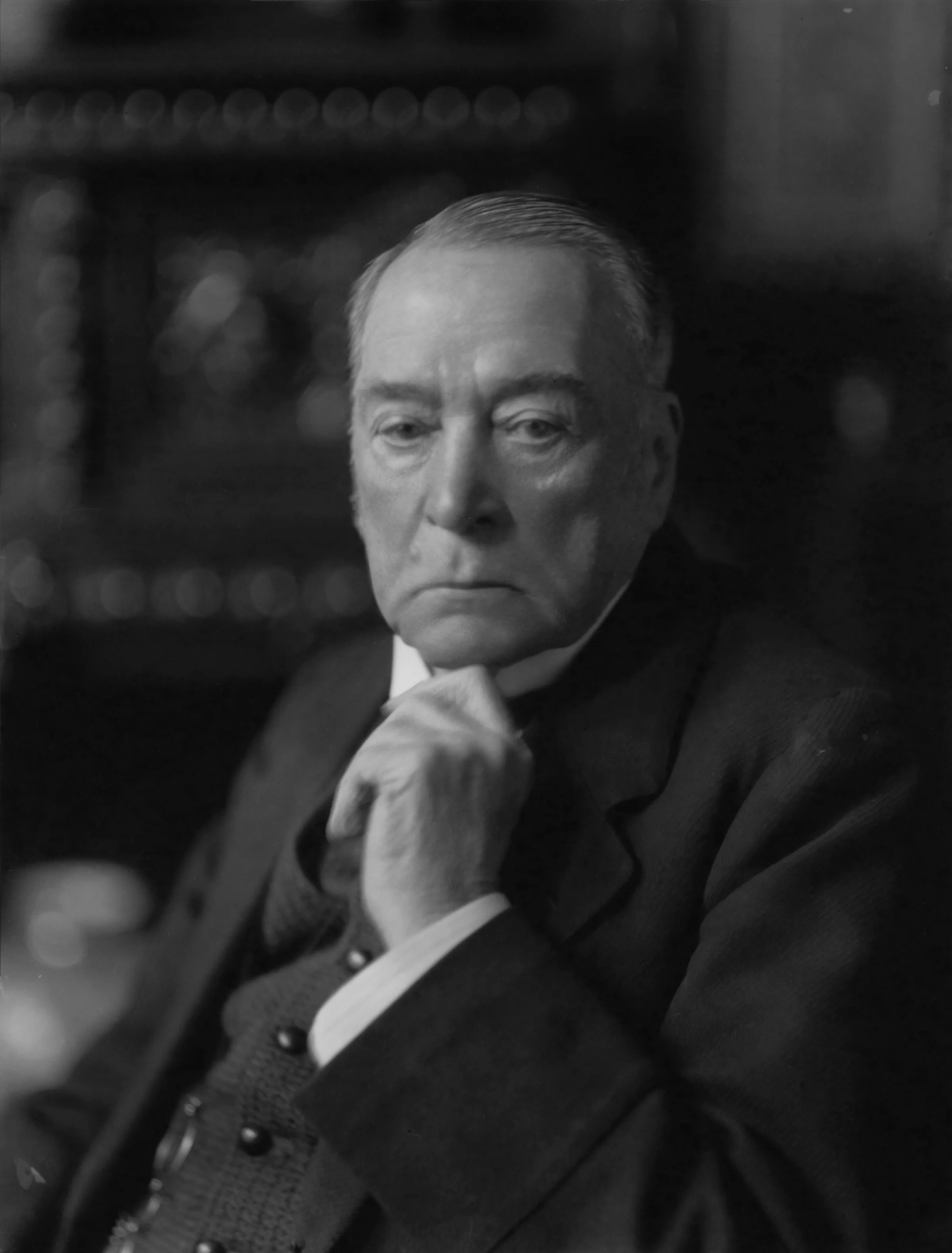
Bigham in 1928

Charles Clive Bigham, 2nd Viscount Mersey, CMG, CBE, PC, FSA (18 August 1872 – 20 November 1956) was a British peer and Liberal politician.

== Biography ==
The son of John Bigham, 1st Viscount Mersey, Bigham was educated at Cheam School, Eton College (where he was a King's Scholar) and Sandhurst, and was commissioned into the Grenadier Guards in 1892. Finding soldiering uncongenial, he joined the reserves and travelled to the Ottoman Empire, Persia, Russia, China, and the Balkans, holding appointments as honorary attaché to various British embassies along the way. In 1897 he became special correspondent to The Times during the Greco-Turkish War, following the Ottoman Army. At the end of the war he was appointed honorary attaché to the British embassy at Constantinople at the request of Sir Philip Currie, in order to act as British representative on the International Repatriation Commission for displaced Greek peasants in Thessaly.

In 1899, he was transferred to the Peking embassy, and joined the Russian Army on campaign in Manchuria during the Boxer Rebellion. In 1900, he served as intelligence office to Admiral Sir Edward Seymour during the abortive Seymour Expedition, for which he was mentioned in dispatches. For his service in China he was appointed CMG. He contested Windsor for the Liberals in the 1906 general election, but narrowly lost. In 1926 he bought a country house, Bignor Park, which has served as the family's seat since.

He was Deputy Speaker of the House of Lords from 1933 and served as Liberal Chief Whip in the House of Lords from 1944 to 1949. In 1946 he was sworn of the Privy Council.

Mersey died on 20 November 1956 and was succeeded in his peerages by his son Edward Clive Bigham, 3rd Viscount Mersey.

Peerage of the United Kingdom
Preceded by John Bigham	Viscount Mersey; 1929–1956	Succeeded by Edward Clive Bigham
