= De Barry family =

Noble Cambro-Norman family

Arms of de Barry: Argent, three bars gemelles gules

The de Barry family (de Barra/Barri) is a noble Cambro-Norman family which held extensive land holdings in Wales and Ireland. The founder of the de Barry family was a Norman knight, Odo, who assisted in the Norman Conquest of England and south-east Wales during the 11th century. As a reward for his military services, Odo was granted estates in Pembrokeshire and around Barry, Wales, including Barry Island just off the coast.

Odo's grandson, Gerald of Wales, a 12th-century scholar, gives the origin of his family's name, de Barry, in his Itinerarium Cambriae (1191): "Not far from Caerdyf is a small island situated near the shore of the Severn, called Barri, from St. Baroc ... From hence a noble family, of the maritime parts of South Wales, who owned this island and the adjoining estates, received the name of de Barri."

Many family members later assisted in the Norman invasion of Ireland. For the family's services, King John of England awarded Philip's son, William de Barry, extensive baronies in the Kingdom of South Munster, specifically the defunct Uí Liatháin kingdom (O'Lethan and Imokilly) with its late seat at Castlelyons.

== Ancestry ==
Odo de Barry was the grantee of the immense manor of Manorbier in Pembrokeshire, which included the manors of Jameston and Manorbier Newton, as well as the manors of Begelly and Penally. He built the first motte-and-bailey at Manorbier. His son, William FitzOdo de Barry, is the common ancestor of the Barry family in Ireland. He rebuilt Manorbier Castle in stone and the family retained the lordship of Manorbier until the 15th century.

Ancestors of De Barry family

Odo de Barry
William FitzOdo de Barry
Philip de Barry
Otho
Walter FitzOther
Gerald de Windsor
Beatrice
Angharad de Windsor
Tewdwr ap Cadell
Rhys ap Tewdwr, King of Deheubarth
Gwenllian ferch Gwyn of Dyfed
Nest ferch Rhys
Rhiwallon ap Cynfyn
Gwladys ferch Rhiwallon

=== Issue of William FitzOdo de Barry ===
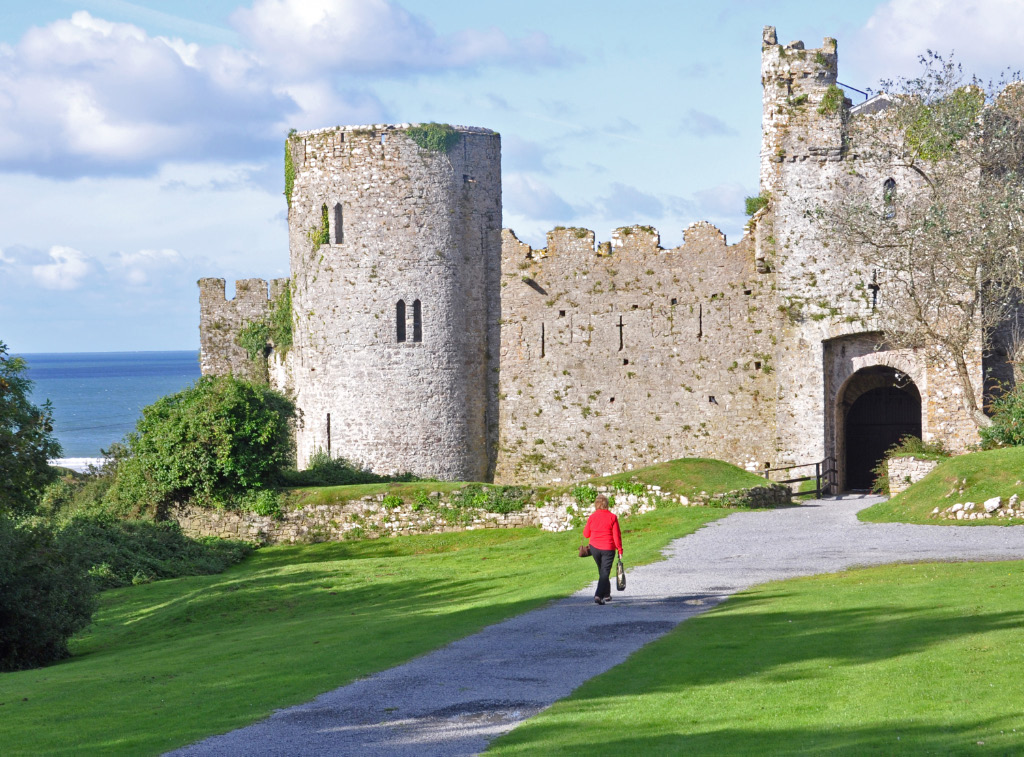
Manorbier Castle

He had sons: Robert, Philip, Walter and Gerald (better known as Giraldus Cambrensis) by Angharad (also known as Hangharad) daughter of Gerald de Windsor (died 1135) and Nest ferch Rhys (died after 1136). After Gerald's death, Nest's sons married her to Stephen, her husband's constable of Cardigan Castle, by whom she had another two sons; the eldest was Robert Fitz-Stephen.

- Robert de Barry accompanied his half-uncle Robert Fitz-Stephen in the Norman invasion of Ireland. He took part in the Siege of Wexford and was killed at the battle of Lismore in 1185.
- Philip de Barry came to Ireland in 1185 to assist his half-uncle Robert Fitz-Stephen, and his first cousin Raymond FitzGerald (also known as Raymond Le Gros), in their efforts to recover lands in the modern county Cork—the cantreds of Killede, Olethan and Muscarydonegan.

The latter cantred, variously called Muscry-donnegan or "O'Donegan's country" or "Múscraighe Tri Maighe", was a rural deanery in the Diocese of Cloyne. It is now identified as the barony of Orrery and Kilmore. The name "Olethan" (or "Oliehan") is an anglicisation of the Gaelic Uí Liatháin which refers to the early-medieval kingdom of the Uí Liatháin. This petty kingdom encompassed most of the present Barony of Barrymore and the neighbouring barony of Kinnatalloon. The name Killyde survives in "Killeady Hills", the name of the hill country south of the city of Cork.

These cantreds or baronies had been expropriated by another (half) first cousin, Ralph Fitz-Stephen (died 1182), the grandson of Nesta by Stephen, Constable of Cardigan. Robert Fitz-Stephen eventually ceded these territories to Philip de Barry, his half-nephew. In 1181, King Henry II of England ennobled Robert de Barry as Baron Barry of Olethan and Ibawne. On 24 February 1206, King John of England confirmed William de Barry, Philip's son, in the possession of these territories and, by letters patent, conferred on him the Lordships of Castlelyons, Buttevant and Barry's Court in East Cork. In 1267, King Henry III of England appointed Lord David de Barry as Chief Justice of Ireland. Another member of the family, William de Barry, was justice in eyre, 1289–94. In 1385, King Richard II of England raised John Barry to the viscountcy as Viscount Buttevant. In 1627, King Charles I of England elevated David Barry as Earl of Barrymore.

=== Family seat ===
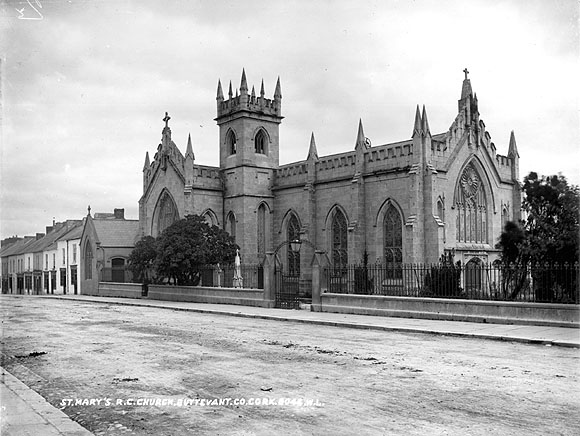
St Mary's Church, Buttevant 1832-1836

Barryscourt Castle near Carrigtwohill was the seat of the Barry family from the 12th century until 1617 when they removed to Barrymore Castle in Castlelyons. In 1771, the 6th Earl saw Barrymore Castle burn to the ground. The family fortunes were subsequently dissipated by his issue, the 7th and 8th Earls.

The name of the town of Buttevant is believed to derive from the family's battle cry—Boutez-en-Avant, roughly translating as "Kick your way through".

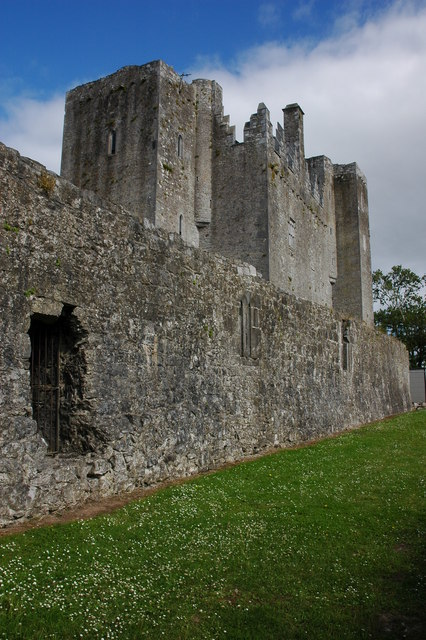
Barryscourt Castle Carrigtwohill, County Cork

Buttevant Castle c. 1880

== Irish descendants ==
The most prominent Gaelic neighbours of the de Barrys were the MacCarthy Reagh dynasty, rulers of the principality or petty kingdom of Carbery. For the most part, with not a great many exceptions, the two families kept on good terms, and also regularly intermarried. The de Barrys are descended from several of the MacCarthy Reagh princes and vice versa, through this intermarriage. Likewise the Barrys intermarried with the also powerful MacCarthys of Muskerry.

Some Barrys eventually became so Gaelicized that a paternal Gaelic lineage was imagined for them. They were made to descend from Fothach Canann, fifth son of the famous Lugaid Mac Con of the Dáirine or Corcu Loígde.

== Uí Liatháin ==
The Uí Liatháin or "Sons of Liathán", whose long-decayed and defunct kingdom the de Barrys by coincidence came to occupy, are notable for having raided other parts of Britain in antiquity from their fortresses in Wales and Cornwall. Also, notable is that the de Barry family descend maternally, through Angharad and Nesta, from the ancient Welsh prince Cunedda, whose sons were the Britons who ended the Uí Liatháin's dominance in Wales.

== See also ==
- FitzGerald dynasty
- Earl of Barrymore
- Arthur Smith-Barry, 1st Baron Barrymore
