= Siege of Dublin =

The siege of Dublin may refer to various sieges of the Irish capital including:

- Siege of Dublin (1171), during the Norman invasion of Ireland
- Siege of Dublin (1534), during the Kildare Rebellion
- Siege of Dublin (1649), during the War of the Three Kingdoms
