= Robert FitzStephen =

Cambro-Norman nobleman

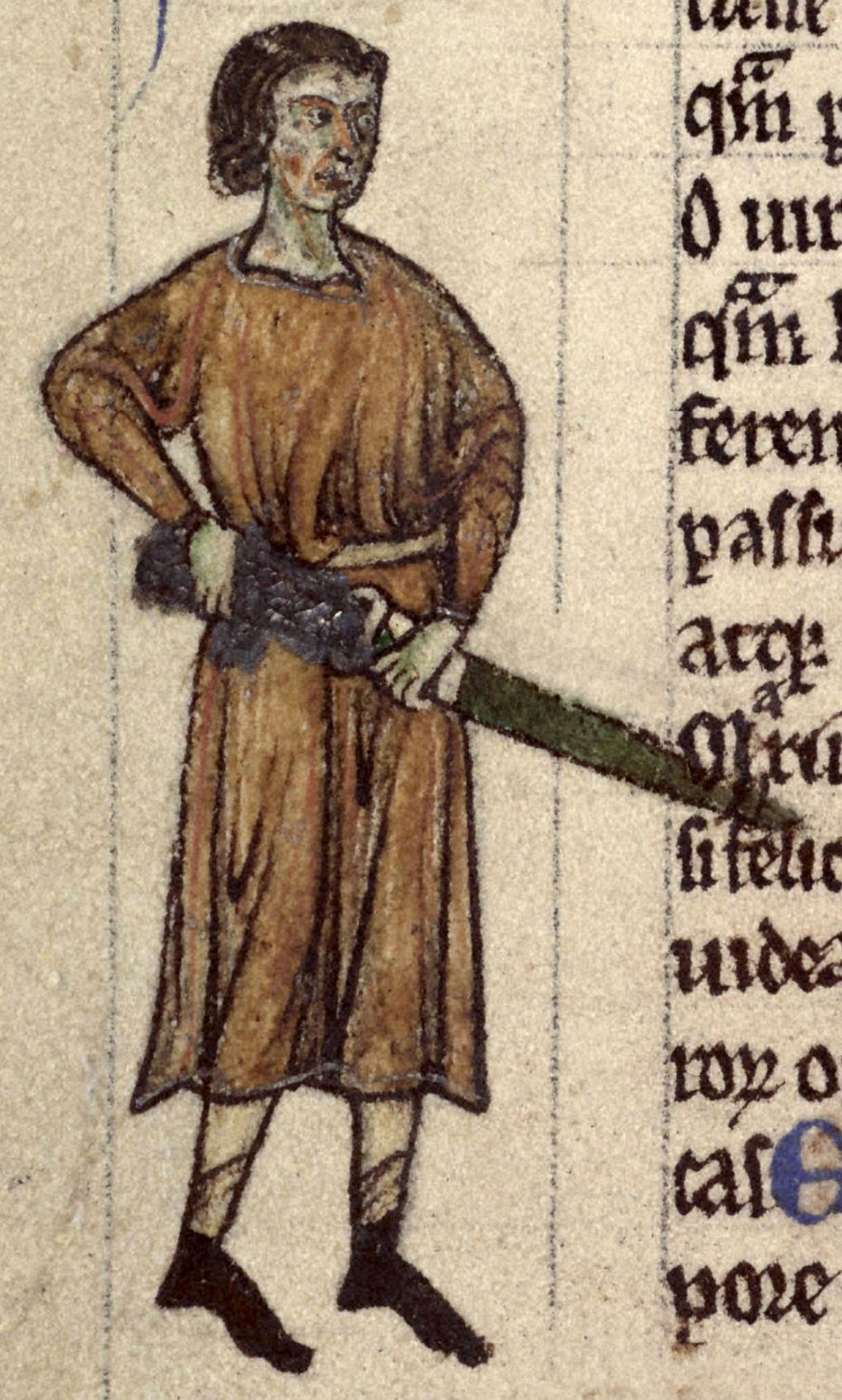
- Robert Fitzstephen as depicted in Gerald of Wales's Expugnatio Hibernica (1189)
- Died: 1183
- Offices: Constable of Cardigan
- Noble family: FitzStephen
- Father: Stephen, Constable of Cardigan
- Mother: Nest ferch Rhys

Robert FitzStephen (died 1183) was a Cambro-Norman soldier, one of the leaders of the Norman invasion of Ireland, for which he was granted extensive lands in Ireland. He was a son of the famous Nest, daughter of Rhys ap Tewdwr, the last king of Deheubarth (South Wales). His father was Nest's second husband, Stephen, Constable of Cardigan (Welsh: Aberteifi). Following the death of her first husband, Gerald de Windsor, her sons had married her to Stephen, her husband's constable for Cardigan. By Stephen, she had another son, possibly two; the eldest was Robert, and the younger may have been Hywel.

== Career ==
=== In Wales ===
Robert succeeded his father in his office (Custos Campe Abertivi). He first appears in history in 1157, when King Henry II of England invaded Gwynedd. While the main royal army faced the forces of Owain Gwynedd east of the River Conwy, a force including Robert and his half-brother Henry Fitzroy (the illegitimate son of Nest and King Henry I) attacked Anglesey by sea. However, this force was defeated in a battle in which Robert was seriously wounded and Henry killed.

Robert was captured in November 1165 by Rhys ap Gruffydd (The Lord Rhys) who was the nephew of his mother Nest. The King of Leinster appealed to Rhys (in 1167) to release Robert for an expedition to Ireland. Rhys did not oblige at the time, but in response to a further appeal in 1168 released Robert from captivity.

=== In Ireland ===
In 1167, the King of Leinster, Diarmait Mac Murchada, was deprived of his kingdom by the High King of Ireland. To recover his kingdom, the exiled king fled to Wales and from there to England and Aquitaine in France, in order to gain the consent of King Henry II of England to recruit soldiers. On returning to Wales, Fitz-Stephen helped him to organise a mercenary army of Norman and Welsh soldiers, including Richard de Clare, 2nd Earl of Pembroke, alias Strongbow. On 1 May 1169, Robert led the vanguard of Diarmait Mac Murchada's Cambro-Norman auxiliaries to Ireland, thereby precipitating the Norman invasion of Ireland. The main invasion party landed near Bannow Bay, County Wexford with a force of 30 knights, 60 men-at-arms and 300 archers. The next day, Maurice de Prendergast landed at the same bay with ten knights and 60 archers. This force merged with about 500 soldiers commanded by Diarmait . In return for capturing Wexford, MacMurrough granted Fitz-Stephen a share in two cantreds, Bargy and Forth which comprised all the land between Bannow and the town of Wexford. The cantreds were to be held jointly with Maurice FitzGerald, Lord of Lanstephan, his half-brother. The Siege of Wexford lasted only two days. The first attack was repulsed at the loss of 18 Normans and 3 defenders. These are believed to have been the only deaths during the siege. Fitz-Stephen then ordered his men to burn all the ships in the town's harbour. The next morning, the attack on Wexford began again. Shortly after, the defenders sent envoys to Diarmait. The defenders agreed to surrender and renew their allegiance to Diarmait. It is claimed that they were persuaded to surrender by two bishops who were in the town at the time. He was accompanied at the siege by Robert de Barry, the eldest son of his half-sister Angharad de Windsor. Nest then, was the mother of Robert, Maurice and Angharad

The Irish launched a counteroffensive in the summer of 1171. Dublin was besieged by a large army under the command of the King of Ireland, Ruadhrí Ua Conchobhair. Fitzstephen sent his best troops to assist the besieged garrison in Dublin, however this left Wexford vulnerable to attack. Lacking the strength to defend the town, Fitzstephen withdrew to Carrick.

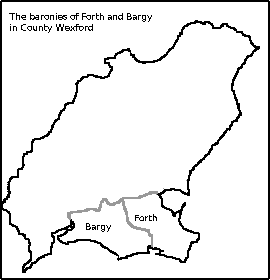
The baronies of Forth and Bargy in County Wexford

After taking Wexford he was pursued by the Irish to Carrick where he was besieged. Eventually he was forced to surrender. However, after the Norman garrison in Dublin managed to break the siege, the Irish took Fitzstephen and his men prisoner and retreated, burning Wexford as they withdrew.

Taken prisoner by the MacCarthy Reagh in 1171, he was by then surrendered to Henry II of England, who appointed him lieutenant of the Justiciar of Ireland, Hugh de Lacy.

Robert rendered good service in the troubles of 1173 and was rewarded in 1177 by receiving from the king of England, jointly with Miles de Cogan, a grant of the kingdom of Cork, "from Lismore to the sea". with the exception of the city of Cork. Cogan was the son of Robert's half-sister Gwladys. The native princes of that province disputed the king's right to dispose of the territory on the grounds that they had not resisted king Henry, or committed any act that would have justified the forfeiture of their lands. In consequence, Fitz-Stephen had difficulty in maintaining his position and was nearly overwhelmed by a rising in the Kingdom of Desmond in 1182. Having no living male heirs, Fitz-Stephen eventually ceded these territories to Philip de Barry, his half-nephew around 1180:

"Robert FitzStephen to all his lords, friends, and dependents, French, English, Welsh, and Irish, greeting. Be it known to you that I have given and granted to my nephew, Philip de Barri, three cantreds in my land of Cork, namely, Olethan, with all its appurtenances, and two other cantreds in the kingdom of Cork, just as they shall come by lot to him, for ten knights' service, to himself and his heirs, to be held of me and my heirs, for the service aforesaid, in land, in sea, in waters, in ways, etc., to be held as freely of me as I hold of our lord the King, save to me the service of the aforesaid ten knights.

The second son of his half-sister Angharad de Windsor, Philip de Barry came to Ireland in 1183 or 1185 to assist his half-uncle. Together with another relative, Raymond FitzGerald (also known as Raymond Le Gros), they recovered their lands in the modern county of Cork, specifically the baronies of Killede, Olethan and Muscarydonegan. A compromise agreement was reached that allowed the barons to hold seven cantreds near Cork with the remaining twenty-four being retained by the native princes.

The date of his death is uncertain.

== See also ==
- List of baronies of Ireland
