= Philip de Barry =

Cambro-Norman warrior

Philip de Barry (fl. 1183) was a Cambro-Norman warrior from Manorbier in Pembrokeshire who participated in the colonisation of Kingdom of Desmond following the Norman invasion of Ireland. He was the founder of the Barry or De Barry family in County Cork, and common ancestor of the barons Barry and earls of Barrymore.

Philip was born circa 1137/44 and was described by his brother Gerald as "a wise and honourable man" (vir probus ac prudens). He died while his brother Gerald was at Rome in 1199–1200 and was entombed in the church of Manorbier.

== Lands in Ireland ==
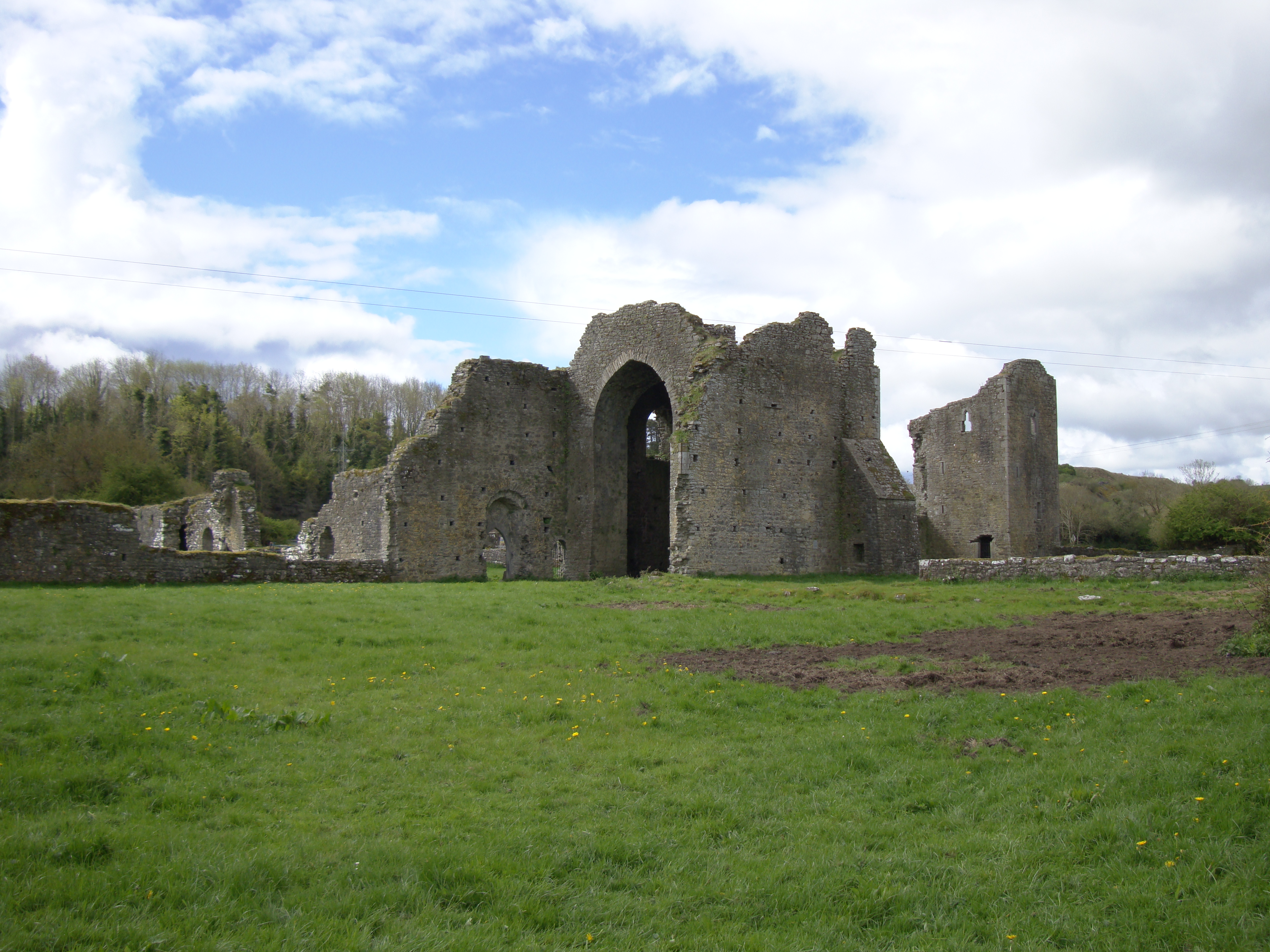
Ballybeg Priory, Buttevant

Philip de Barry came to Ireland at the end of February 1183, accompanied by his brother Gerald and their followers, to take possession of his lands and to assist his half-uncle Robert Fitz-Stephen, and his first cousin Raymond FitzGerald (also known as Raymond Le Gros), in their efforts to recover lands in the modern county of Cork. These cantrefs or baronies had been expropriated by another (half) first cousin, Ralph Fitz-Stephen (or Radulph). Ralph was the grandson of Nesta by Stephen, Constable of Cardigan. In 1182 he was killed together with his father-in-law, Milo de Cogan, who had been granted of the second half of the kingdom of Cork. Robert Fitz-Stephen eventually ceded these territories to Philip, his half-nephew. These territories consisted of three cantrefs in Fitz-Stephen's half of the Kingdom of Desmond ("the kingdom of Cork") viz. Olethan, Muschiri-on-Dunnegan (or Muskerry Donegan) and Killyde (or Killede) by the service of ten knights. These cantrefs became the baronies or hundreds of Oliehan, Oryrry and Ogormliehan respectively. The name "Oliehan" is an anglicisation of the Gaelic Uí Liatháin which refers to the early medieval kingdom of the Uí Liatháin. This petty kingdom encompassed most of the land in Barrymore and the neighbouring barony of Kinnatalloon. Oryrry is currently known as the Barony of Orrery and Kilmore. The name Killyde survives in "Killeady Hills", the name of the hill country south of the city of Cork. According to Smith, "on the north side of the city stood Shandon Castle, built by the Barrys soon after the Conquest, or, as some say, by King John,". According to Rev. Barry, the baronies were

"coextensive with the ecclesiastical deaneries of Olethan and Muscry Donnegan in the diocese of Cloyne, and Ocurblethan, in the diocese of Cork. According to the Taxations of A.D. 1302, 1307, as given by Sweetman, the deanery of Olethan comprised the barony of Kinnatalloon, and the Cloyne part of the barony of Barrymore, exclusive of the Great Island and the parish of Mogeesha, which went with Imokilly, till taken from the Hodnets by the Barries in A.D. 1329. The deanery of Muscry Donnegan comprised the barony of Orrery and Kilmore and the Cloyne part of the barony of Duhallow, except Kilshannig parish, which was then in Muskerrylin. The deanery of Ocurblethan comprised the Cork part of the barony of Barrymore and the North Liberties of Cork, except, perhaps, the parish of Currykippane."

Rev. Barry goes on to posit that the name "Killyde" may derive from Killeagh (Irish: Cill Aedha), which lies in the parish of Dunbollogue in the old deanery of Ocurblethan.

== Issue ==
Philip married the daughter of Richard FitzTancred, castellan of Haverfordwest, and by her had four children:

- Robert (born circa 1160),
- William (born circa 1170), who succeeded to his cantreds, which were confirmed to him by King John I of England on 8 November 1207. By letters patent, John conferred on him the Lordships of Castlelyons and Buttevant in north Cork and Barry's Court in the civil parish of Carrigtwohill in southeast Cork. The family would eventually acquire the honours of Viscount Buttevant and Earl of Barrymore. William founded the priory of St. Thomas à Becket at Ballybeg for the Canons Regular of St. Augustine in 1229. His son, David Óg de Barry, enlarged the revenues of the priory in 1251.
- Gerald (born circa 1175), who succeeded his uncle Geraldus Cambrensis as Archdeacon of Brecon in 1203; and
- a daughter, who married Walter Mancenell.

=== Note ===
According to the "Archdall's Lodge" (1789) source, Robert de Barry, "after his services in Ireland is said to seat himself at Sevington, in Kent," and "about the year 1185 being killed at Lismore,". But as he was elder than his brother Gerald, who was born in 1146 or 1147, this Robert was about forty years old in 1185. The same source reports that the Robert who was slain near Lismore in that year was only an adolescens, that is between fifteen and twenty eight years of age. It is improbable therefore that Robert (aged over 40) was slain at Lismore. That person is more likely to be Philip's son, also called Robert.

== Ancestry ==
=== Nesta ===
Philip's role in the invasion and colonisation of Ireland, and his position in the medieval Welsh-Irish Norman society, was largely due to his membership of the extended family of descendants of Princess Nest or Nesta of Deheubarth. Nest had three sons and a daughter by her first husband Gerald de Windsor: the daughter, Angharad, married William de Barry.

=== William de Barry ===
Philip was the son of William Fitz Odo de Barry was the son of Odo or Otho, a Norman knight who assisted in the Norman Conquest of England and Wales during the 11th century. William rebuilt Manorbier Castle in stone and the family retained the lordship of Manorbier until the 15th century. Philip's mother was Angharad, daughter of Gerald and Nest. Philip succeeded his father at Manorbier. His uncle (his mother Angharad's half brother) was Robert Fitz-Stephen whose cousins were the founders of the great FitzGerald and Carew families in Ireland. Philip's full brothers were Robert and Gerald.

- Robert de Barry accompanied his half-uncle Robert Fitz-Stephen in the Norman invasion of Ireland and took part in the Siege of Wexford. While some sources say that he was killed at the battle of Lismore in 1185, this is probably not true (see note below).
- Gerald of Wales, alias Giraldus Cambrensis, was a clergyman and historian.

He also had a half-brother - Walter.
