= Robert de Barry =

Cambro-Norman warrior, coloniser of Ireland

Robert de Barry (fl. 1175) was a Cambro-Norman warrior from Manorbier in Pembrokeshire who participated in the colonisation of the Kingdom of Desmond following the Norman invasion of Ireland.

== Ancestry ==
Robert's role in the invasion and colonisation of Ireland, and his position in the medieval Welsh-Irish Norman society, was largely due to his membership of the extended family of descendants of Princess Nest ferch Rhys of Deheubarth. Nest had three sons and a daughter with her husband Gerald de Windsor: the daughter, Angharad, married William de Barry. Nest also had a son - Robert Fitz-Stephen - by her second husband.

William Fitz Odo de Barry was the son of Odo or Otho, a Norman knight who assisted in the Norman Conquest of England and Wales during the 11th century. William rebuilt Manorbier Castle in stone and the family retained the lordship of Manorbier until the 15th century.

Ancestors of Robert de Barry

Odo de Barry
William FitzOdo de Barry
Robert de Barry
Otho
Walter FitzOtho
Gerald de Windsor
Gwladys ferch Ryall
Angharad de Windsor
Tewdwr ap Evenus
Rhys ap Tewdwr
Nest ferch Rhys
Rhiwallon ap Cynfyn
Gwladys ferch Rhiwallon

Barry's brothers were Philip de Barry, Edmond de Barry and Gerald of Wales. He accompanied his half-uncle Robert to Ireland in 1169 and took part in the Siege of Wexford, where he was wounded. He is mentioned as still engaged in warfare about 1175 by his brother Gerald, the historian, who highly extols his prowess.

== Note ==
According to the "Archdall's Lodge" (1789) source, Robert, "after his services in Ireland is said to seat himself at Sevington, in Kent," and "about the year 1185 being killed at Lismore,". But as he was elder than his brother Gerald, who was born in 1146 or 1147, this Robert was about forty years old in 1185. The same source reports that the Robert who was slain near Lismore in that year was only an adolescens that is, between fifteen and twenty eight years of age. It is improbable therefore that Robert (aged 40) was slain at Lismore. That person is more likely to be his namesake, the son of his brother Philip.
