= Expugnatio Hibernica =

12th-century Latin work

- The conquest of Ireland
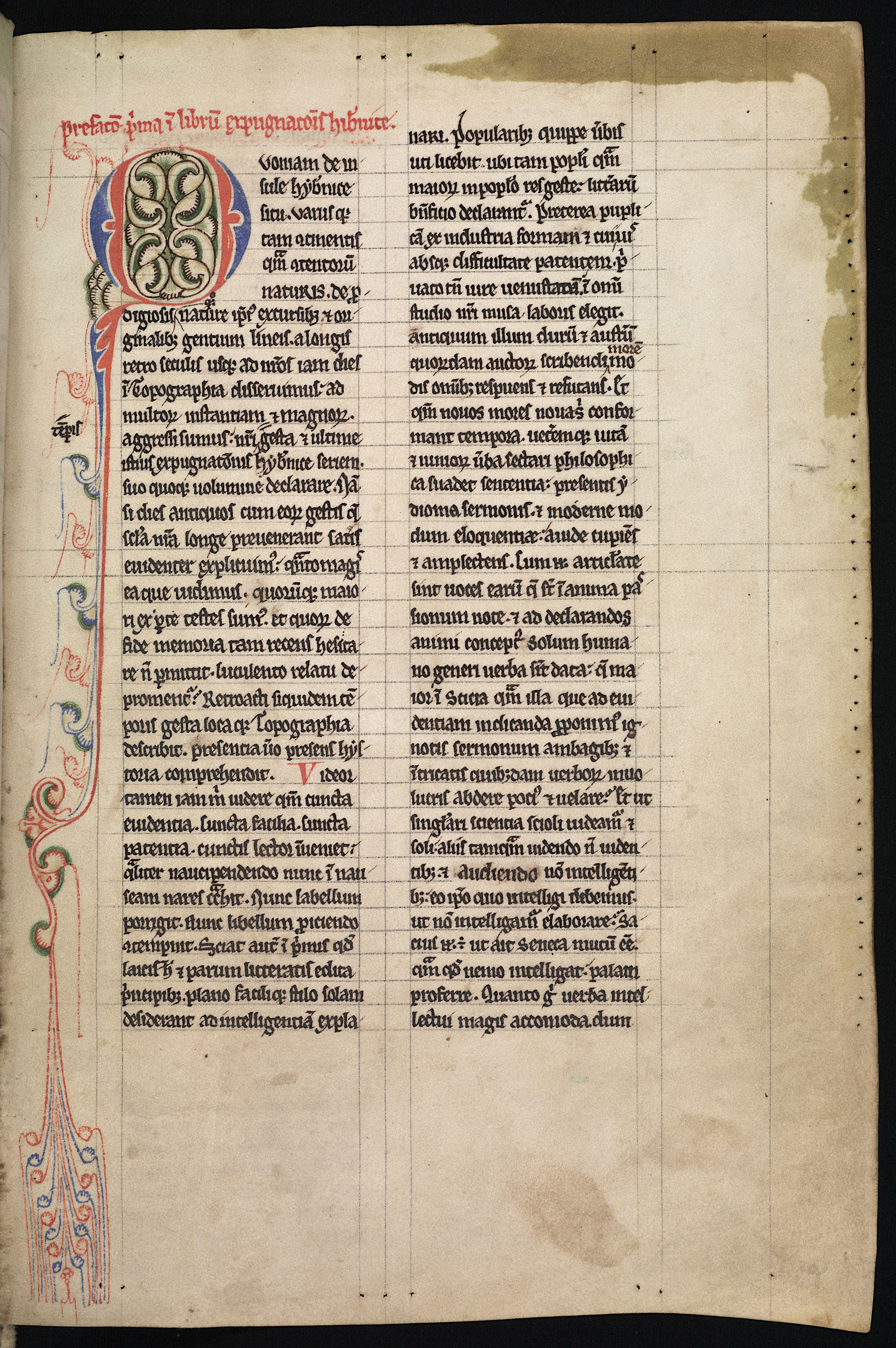
- Opening page of the Expugnatio Hibernica
- Also known as: Vaticinalis Historia; The Prophetic History
- Author(s): Gerald of Wales
- Dedicated to: Richard I of England, John, King of England
- Language: Latin
- Date: 1189
- State of existence: Extant
- First printed edition: 1577
- Genre: Narrative history
- Subject: Anglo-Norman invasion of Ireland

The Expugnatio Hibernica, or The Conquest of Ireland, is a medieval historical narrative by Gerald of Wales on the twelfth-century Anglo-Norman invasion of Ireland. Completed in c. 1189, a second recension was issued c. 1209.

It was a popular medieval work and survives in thirty-six manuscripts, most in Latin but some in English and Irish. It was first published, abridged, in the 1577 edition of Holinshed's Chronicles and then in full in the 1587 edition. A 1602 publication by William Camden brought it to wider attention and triggered broad attacks on its veracity by Irish apologists who considered it a concoction of lies, though modern scholarship is more nuanced in its assessment.

Though a flawed work, biased towards Gerald's family and against the Irish, it is considered the main source regarding the invasion and one of the most important works for the history of medieval Ireland.

== Background ==
In 1166 Diarmait Mac Murchada, the king of Leinster, was driven into exile by Tigernán Ua Ruairc and his allies. With the permission of Henry II Diarmait sought allies in England and Wales and in 1169 returned to Ireland with a force of Cambro-Norman adventurers, joined the following year by Richard de Clare.

Diarmait died in 1171 and de Clare claimed Leinster through marriage to Diarmait's daughter Aoife, causing Henry II to fear he might establish an autonomous lordship. Henry landed in Ireland in late 1171 to assert royal authority, receiving submissions from Irish rulers and the leading Anglo-Norman captains, but fighting and settlement continued after his departure; the events of the 1170s and 1180s formed the immediate background for Gerald's account of the invasion and early colony.

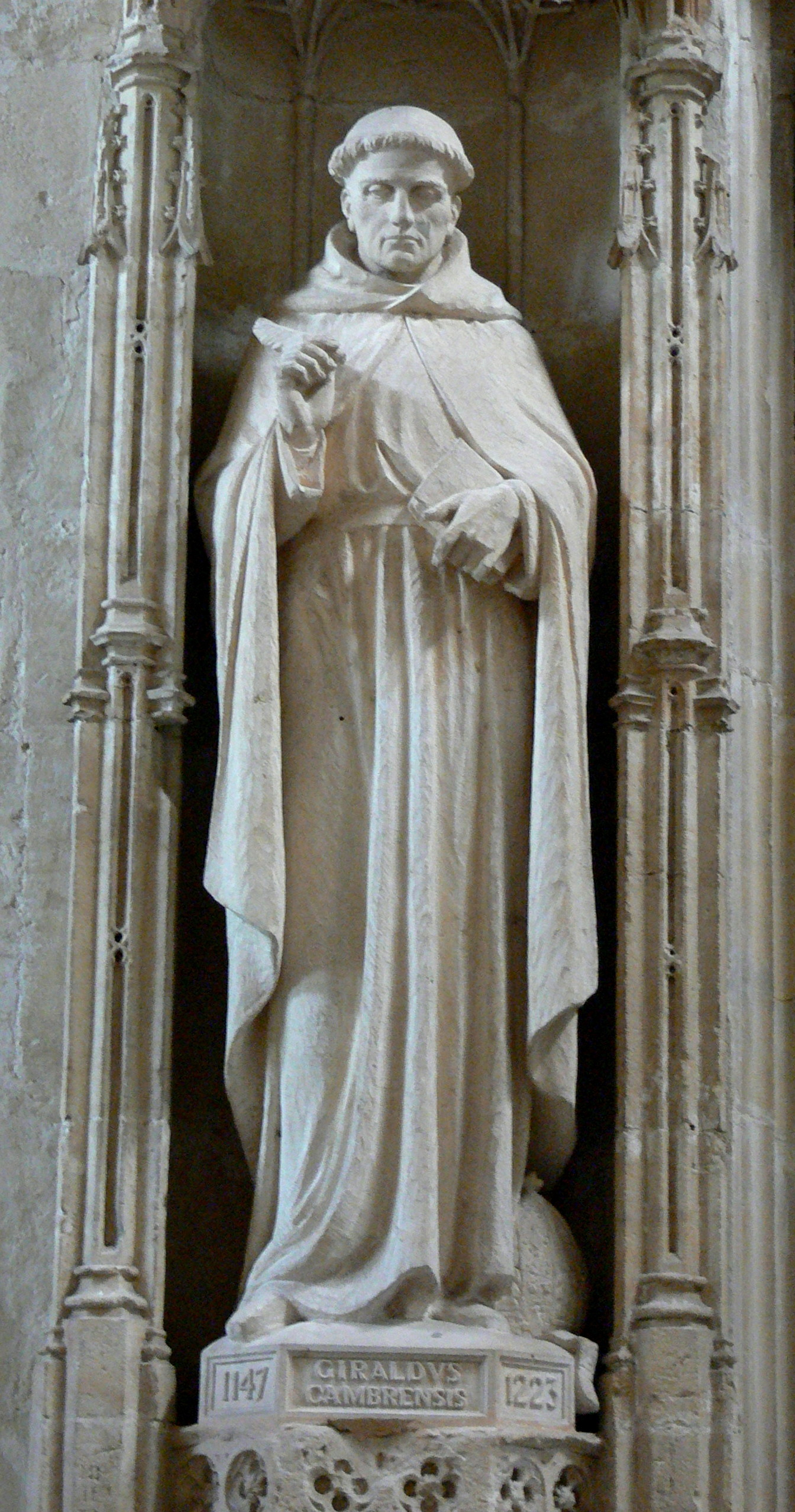
Statue of Gerald of Wales in St Davids Cathedral

=== Gerald of Wales ===
Gerald of Wales was a scholar and churchman, born to a mixed Norman and Welsh family among the marcher gentry of South Wales. He studied in St Peter's Abbey in Gloucester before moving to Paris where he studied the trivium.

After this first period in Paris he returned to Wales, where in 1176 he sought election to the see of St Davids but due to Henry II's opposition was unsuccessful despite the support from the monks. He then returned to Paris for about three years, until c. 1180, where he studied canon law and theology, lecturing on the former.

In February 1183 he visited Ireland with his cousin, Philip de Barry, and stayed for about a year. After returning and at the urging of Henry II, he reluctantly accepted the position of royal clerk. He returned to Ireland for another year around April 1185 with Henry's son, John Lackland. He used his time in Ireland to gather material for both the Expugnatio Hibernica and the Topographia Hibernica, issuing the Topographia c. 1188.

== Composition and textual history ==
Traditionally referred to as the Expugnatio Hibernica, or the Conquest of Ireland, the work has several names. Gerald referred to it as the Expugnatio Hibernica and the Vaticinalis historia, or The Prophetic History. He also combined the two names, calling it the Vaticinalem Hybernicae expugnationis Historiam or The Prophetic History of the Conquest of Ireland in a 1218 letter sent to the canons of Hereford Cathedral.

Written in Latin, the Expugnatio Hibernica is a historical narrative but can also be seen as a family epic that promotes the marcher lords who led the initial expedition to Ireland, including Gerald's family. Two recensions were issued, α in c. 1189 and a much revised β likely c. 1209. Historically, there was some dispute over the authorship of β but modern scholars generally accept it as Gerald's work.

=== Date and circumstances of composition ===
Scott and Martin argue that the first recension was completed in the summer of 1189, after the death of Henry II but before the coronation of Richard I. This is based on "Pictavensium comes inclite, Normannorum quoque dux et Anglorum rector mox future", or "Renowned Count of Poitou, also Duke of the Normans, and soon-to-be ruler of the English" appearing in the preface, as it would be insulting to Henry II if it appeared before his death, but inaccurate if it appeared after the coronation of Richard. Gerald tells us that the work took two years to complete, though Scott and Martin argue based on the body of the work that he began in early summer 1188.

=== Dedication and purpose ===
Gerald dedicated the first recension to Richard, count of Poitou, later King Richard I, and the second recension to King John. Like the Topographia Hibernica, Gerald wrote the Expugnatio Hibernica in part as an attempt to obtain patronage, possibly to gain an English bishopric, as well as to argue that his extended family deserved greater rewards for their participation in the conquest than they had received. In his autobiography he said that he wrote the Expugnatio and Topographia "that he might at least by his own labour win some profit or conquest".

He was also committed to the subduing of Ireland and sought to use the Expugnatio Hibernica and the Topographia to justify English invasions of Ireland and to glorify its conquerors. He later used it to encourage further military expeditions there, pressing King John in a 1209 letter accompanying a copy of the Expugnatio Hibernica to return.

=== Recensions and authorial revision ===
Gerald was a "fastidious" stylist and continued to modify the text for years after first writing it. These revisions are divided into two recensions, α and β. α represents the original text and copies with lesser modifications, and β follows a far more extensive reworking of the text. It is unknown when β was issued, but Scott and Martin as well as Amelia Sargent suggest a date around 1209, based on a quotation from the β recension that Gerald included in a letter he sent to King John.

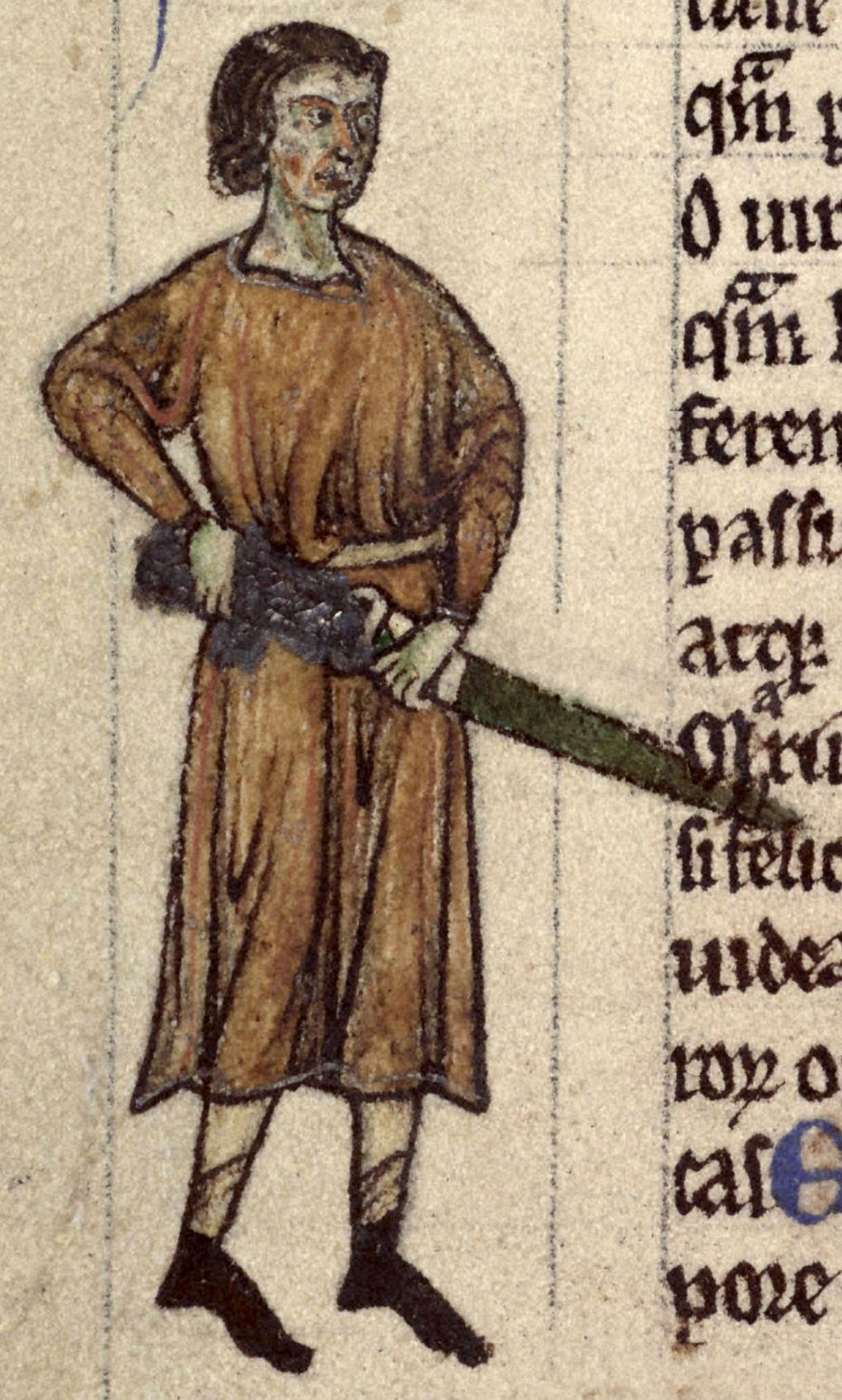
Robert FitzStephen as depicted in the Expugnatio Hibernica

Between α and β there are several intermediate manuscripts which show the evolution of text. In the earliest versions of α Gerald uses arcarii, while in later manuscripts he uses arcarii equestres before settling on satellites equestres. In the earliest versions of α he uses stadia when providing distances, while in later manuscripts he uses a mix of stadia and miliaria or milia passuum and in the β recension he consistently uses miliaria or milia passuum.

Other modifications go beyond stylistic. The description of Robert FitzStephen is enhanced, adding that he was "only slightly above average in height", and alters the account of Raymond FitzGerald to say that upon succeeding his uncle FitzStephen he restored peace following the 1188 Desmond Insurrection "only in part".

The most substantial differences are in the inclusion of prophecies and the papal privileges. α includes two papal privileges, from Pope Adrian IV and Pope Alexander III, granting King Henry II dominium over Ireland, while β omits the privilege from Alexander III.

β also excluded many of the prophecies relating to Merlin, and a third distinction, which Gerald mentioned in the α recension and would have contained further details of prophecies, was never published. It is likely that the initial reason for not issuing the third distinction was out of a desire to avoid offending Henry II, as Gerald's interpretation would not be favourable to him. However, this reason ceases to apply after the death of Henry II and it is unlikely that Gerald, who described Henry II as a "tyrant" in De principis instructione, would have felt a need to continue to suppress the work.

Scott and Martin propose two alternative theories for these excisions and continued suppression. Either Gerald's faith in the prophecies waned over the years between α and β, or he lost the underlying sources and was unwilling to issue works without reference to them. They consider the first theory more probable and Sargent concurs, arguing that Gerald removed them as part of a reconception of the project, to revise his expectations of what constituted a successful conquest of Ireland, and to encourage King John to return and complete the conquest.

Gerald also added two chapters to Expugnatio Hibernica as part of β. The first regarding a vision seen by Henry II at Cardiff, and the second regarding the 1170 synod at Armagh. These chapters are also included in De principis instructione, and the first is included in Itinerarium Kambriae.

== Contents ==
The Expugnatio Hibernica provides a narrative of the Anglo-Norman invasion of Ireland until 1189 and the origin story of the twelfth-century Norman colony. Originally divided into three distinctions, the third was never issued.

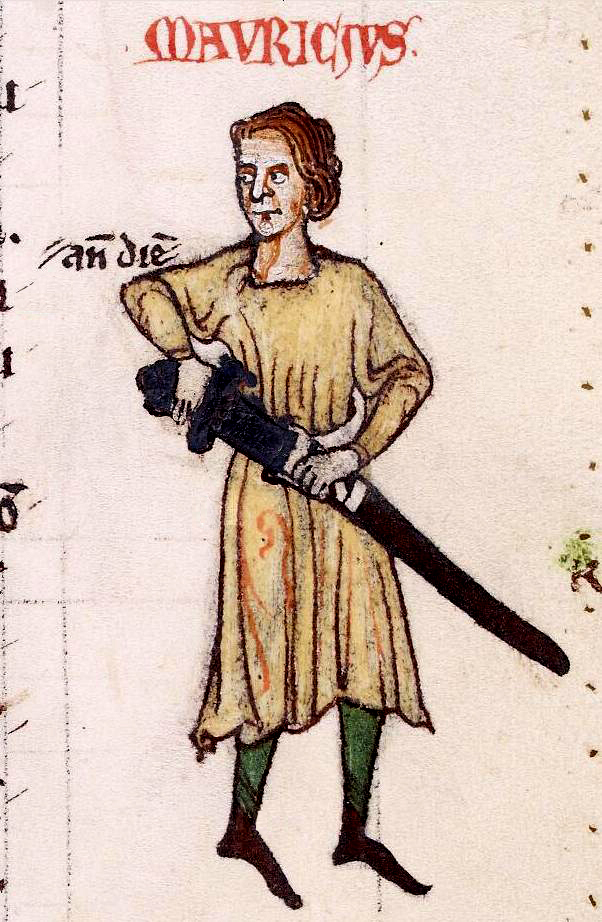
Maurice FitzGerald as depicted in the Expugnatio Hibernica

Gerald describes the first distinction as containing "the account of the exile of Diarmait and his restoration by Henry II, King of England". It covers:

1. The exile of Diarmait
2. The arrival of FitzStephen and the capture of Wexford and Osraige
3. The alliance of the Irish princes against Diarmait and his Norman allies
4. The arrival of Maurice FitzGerald and the capture of Dublin
5. The arrival of Raymond and Earl Richard and the capture of Waterford
6. The arrival of King Henry II and the submission of princes of Ireland
7. The rebellion of King Henry's sons

He describes the second distinction as containing "the account of the return of the earl to Ireland, sent by the King of England, and of Raymond's reinstatement as the commander of the garrison". It presents eight sections of narrative:

1. The activities of Richard de Clare and Raymond le Gros between 1173 and 1175
2. The capture of Limerick
3. The relief of Limerick and the death of le Gros
4. John de Courcy's expedition to Ulster
5. Various events in Ireland in 1177
6. Events involving Hugh de Lacy from 1181 to 1185
7. John Lackland's 1185 expedition to Ireland
8. Events in 1185 and 1186

The accounts in these sections become more compressed as they progress. Gerald justifies this by saying that he was preoccupied preparing for a crusade, though Scott and Martin suggest he may have simply been eager to complete the work.

Two papal privileges claimed to support English dominium over Ireland, Laudabiliter et satis issued by Adrian IV and Quoniam ea issued by Alexander III, are included in chapters five and six of this distinction alongside a defence of the English legal right to Ireland.

== Themes and rhetoric ==
A recurrent theme of the Expugnatio Hibernica is Gerald's praise of his family's achievements in Ireland, and he uses the work both to celebrate their actions and to argue that they deserved greater rewards.

This celebration of Gerald's ancestors results in uneven treatment of the individual Anglo-Norman leaders, with some of those unrelated to him treated with a clear hostile slant. Scott and Martin point to his portrayal of Hervey de Montmorency and William FitzAldelm as cases where "one feels that whatever they do will be given a sinister slant by Gerald".

He also presents some of his relatives, especially Raymond le Gros, as "larger than life", and this comes at the expense of Richard de Clare whose role in the endeavour is diminished.

O'Leary describes it as a "political work", setting out both how Ireland should be conquered and governed, and connecting military success to questions of authority and royal policy. Gerald presents the king as the source of lawful rule, but he also criticises parts of royal intervention in Ireland and argues that conquest would have proceeded further without it. He contrasts the antiqua militia, the "old soldiers", with later arrivals and uses this contrast to frame disputes over leadership and reward.

Gerald's depiction of the Irish relies on hostile ethnographic stereotyping. He describes them as barbarous and treacherous and attributes economic conditions to idleness while allowing only a limited set of positive qualities, including musical skill and clerical chastity. Gerald also uses language of subjugation and "ordering", including the phrase "in formam simul et normam redacta" in support of bringing the Irish into a "disciplined" state.

Modern historians have treated these passages as part of rhetoric justifying conquest and settlement; McKibben says he disseminated "derisory tropes" about the Irish to do so, while Sean Duffy calls the work a defence of dispossession and Jeffrey Jerome Cohen describes his Irish works as "reductive" that "unabashedly glorify the conquest of a foreign land".

Gerald links the invasion to prophecy and reform, and refers to the work as a "prophetic history" that presents the conquest of Ireland as the fulfilment of prophecy, as well as a "civilising mission" tied to papal authority and with the intent to complete a religious agenda.

== Manuscripts and transmission ==
Thirty-six copies of the Expugnatio Hibernica survive. Twelve are bound with the Topographia Hibernica and four with the Itinerarium Kambriae. Seven copies consist of extracts, while ten are translations: eight in English and two in Irish.

Seven of the manuscripts can be dated to within Gerald's lifetime, and Catherine Rooney proposes that four of them were produced by scribes he employed or had access to. Twelve manuscripts from the early modern era survive. Nine are complete, including two in Latin, five in English, and one in Irish.

=== Latin manuscripts ===
Location	Repository	Shelfmark	Century	Bound with	Comments
Cambridge	Trinity College Library	TCC R.7.11	13th		Extracts, possibly produced by Gerald's scribes
Cambridge	Cambridge University Library	MS Ff.1.27	14th to 15th	Topographia Hibernica, Descriptio Kambriae, Itinerarium Kambriae, and other texts	β-recension
London	British Library	Cotton MS Cleopatra D V	14th	Topographia Hibernica, Symbolum electorum, and other texts	β-recension
London	British Library	Harley MS 177	Early 14th		Intermediate α-recension, abbreviated with non-historical content mostly omitted
London	British Library	Royal MS 13 A XIV	Late 13th to early 14th	Topographia Hibernica and other texts	β-recension
London	British Library	Royal MS 13 B VIII	Late 13th to early 14th	Topographia Hibernica, Itinerarium Kambriae, and other texts	α-recension, copied from MS. Rawl. B. 188
London	British Library	Royal MS 14 C XIII	1327-1352	Other texts	β-recension
London	Lambeth Palace Library	Lambeth 371	c. 1200	Other texts	α-recension
Oxford	Bodleian Library	MS. Rawl. B. 188	Early 13th	Topographia Hibernica and Itinerarium Kambriae	α-recension, possibly produced by Gerald's scribes
Aberystwyth	National Library of Wales	NLW MS 3074D	13th to 14th	Topographia Hibernica	β-recension
Cambridge	Cambridge University Library	MS Add. 3392	14th	Other texts	Intermediate α-recension, incomplete at end
Douai	Bibliothèque municipale de Douai	Douai 887	Early 13th	Other texts	α-recension, unfinished, possibly produced by Gerald's scribes
Dublin	National Library of Ireland	MS 700	Early 13th	Topographia Hibernica	α-recension (original text), β-recension (marginal additions), possibly produced by Gerald's scribes
London	British Library	Add. 34762	13th	Topographia Hibernica and Itinerarium Kambriae	α-recension
London	British Library	Harley MS 4003	Late 14th to early 15th	Topographia Hibernica and others	β-recension
London	Lambeth Palace Library	Lambeth 622	15th	Topographia Hibernica	β-recension
London	Lambeth Palace Library	Lambeth 580	c. 1664×1695		α-recension, extract probably from Lambeth 371
Oxford	Bodleian Library	MS. Rawl. D.125	13th		β-recension
London	British Library	Harley 310	16th to 17th		β-recension, copied from Royal MS 14 C XIII
London	British Library	Harley 359	Late 16th	Descriptio Kambriae, Topographia Hibernica, and Itinerarium Kambriae	β-recension, copied in part from Douai 887
Manchester	John Rylands University Library	MS 217	15th	Topographia Hibernica	Extracts, β-recension
London	British Library	Cotton Claudius E.viii	Late 14th	Topographia Hibernica and others	Extracts, late α-recension or β-recension
London	British Library	Royal MS 14 C VI		Topographia Hibernica and others	Extracts
London	British Library	Lansdowne 229	1573	Itinerarium Kambriae and others	Extracts, mid α-recension

=== Vernacular translations and adaptations ===
No vernacular translation of the Expugnatio Hibernica was made during Gerald's lifetime, despite his wish. These wishes include a 1209 letter to King John in which Gerald requested that the text be translated into French to increase the audience of his work.

In the fifteenth century the work was translated in Ireland into Hiberno-English. The source manuscript is unknown, but it was likely closely related to Harley MS 177. The earliest translated text does not survive, and we know neither a precise date of translation nor a precise location of the translation, though it is speculated that it was done during the Kildare Ascendancy of the late fifteenth century. Authorship has been attributed to James Yonge or Thomas Bray, but the evidence is minimal, and it is considered unlikely that it is by either.

This translation is mostly faithful to the original, suggesting that the purpose was to make the text accessible for the audience, although some aspects unrelated to Ireland are omitted. Caoimhe Whelan argues that the intent behind this translation was to promote a sense of English identity in Ireland, while Aisling Byrne argues that it was to support the FitzGerald's rule in Ireland.

Five copies of the Hiberno-English translation, both complete and fragmentary, survive. A Hiberno-English translation was later used as the basis for a heavily abbreviated Irish translation (Dublin, Trinity College Library, MS 1298), and also spawned a seventeenth-century Irish-language copy (Oxford, Bodleian Library, MS Rawlinson B.475).

Four independent translations from the sixteenth century also survive, preserved in six complete manuscripts, five English and one Irish.

Location	Repository	Shelfmark	Language	Century	Comments
Dublin	Trinity College	TCD 592	Hiberno-English	Late 15th	Abbreviated
Oxford	Bodleian Library	MS Rawlinson B 490	Hiberno-English	Late 15th	Abbreviated
London	Lambeth Palace	MS 598	Hiberno-English	Late 15th	Abbreviated
London	British Library	Add. MS 40674	Hiberno-English	Late 15th	Abbreviated
Oxford	Bodleian Library	MS Laud Misc. 526	Hiberno-English	Late 15th	Extract
Dublin	Trinity College	MS 1298	Irish	Late 15th	
London	Lambeth Palace	Lambeth 623	English	Late 16th	Abbreviated
Dublin	Trinity College	MS 593	English	Late 16th	
Dublin	National Library of Ireland	NLI 1416	English	1575	
London	British Library	Harley MS 551	English	1575-1576	β-recension

== Editions and publication history ==
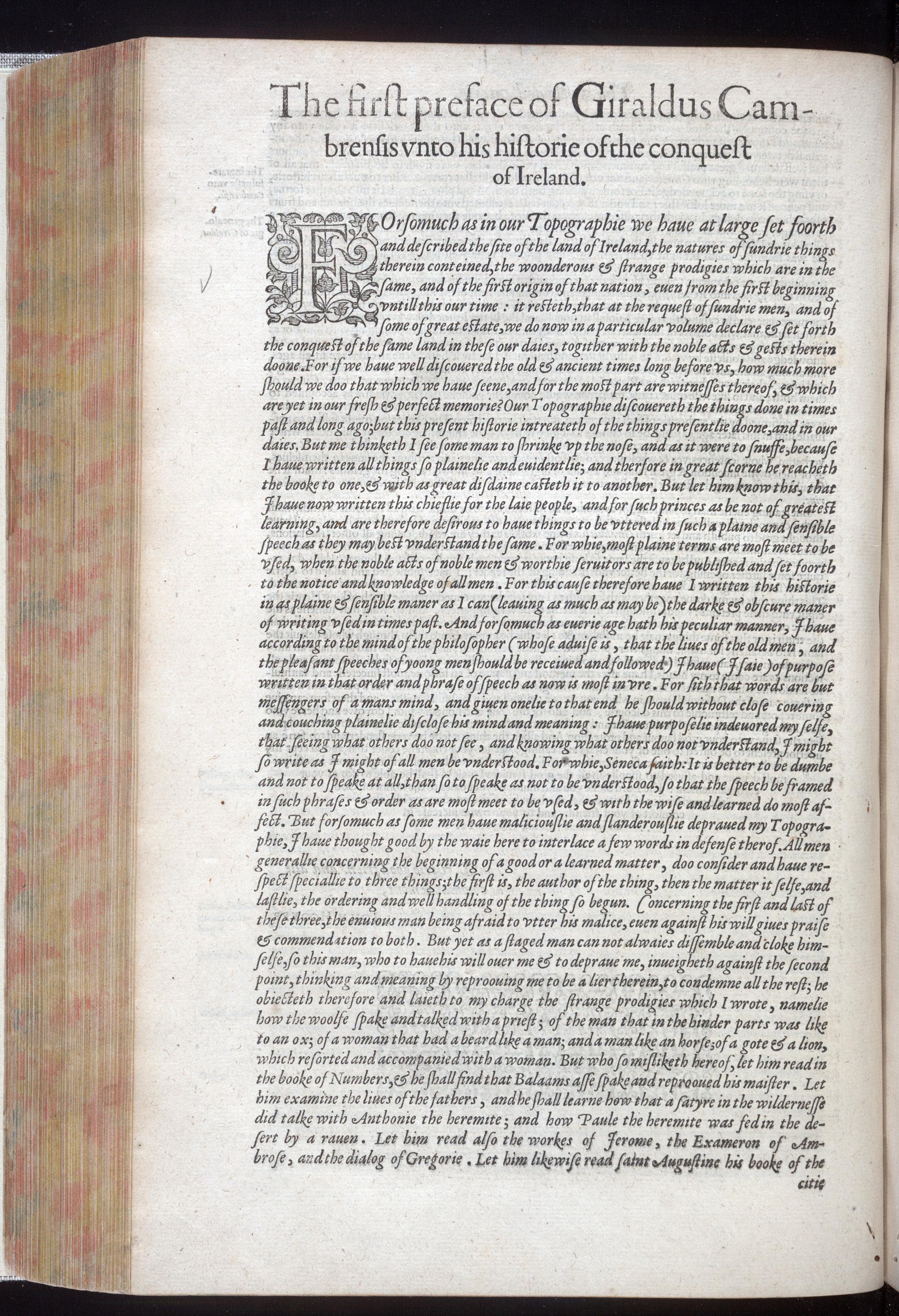
The first page of the Expugnatio Hibernica in the 1587 edition of Holinshed's Chronicles

The Expugnatio Hibernica was the first work of Gerald's to appear in print. It was published in abridged form in the 1577 edition of Raphael Holinshed's Chronicles of England, Scotland, and Ireland, and in full in the 1587 second edition. In 1602 and 1603 William Camden published two editions in Frankfurt, under the title Anglica, Hibernica, Normannica, Cambrica, a veteribus scripta. These bound Gerald's four Irish and Welsh works together and were heavily flawed, taken from a late and low-quality manuscript and carelessly edited.

In 1784 extracts from Camden's editions were printed in Martin Bouquet's Recueil des historiens des Gaules et de la France. In 1863 a translation by Thomas Forester was published as part of Thomas Wright's revised edition, and was republished several times until 1903. This translation was then published in 1908 and 1935 in the Everyman's Library edition, edited by William Llewelyn Williams.

In 1861 James F. Dimock edited the Latin text for the fifth volume of the Rolls Series. This remained the standard edition until 1978, when Brian Scott and F. X. Martin published a parallel-text edition with Latin and English translation.

== Reception and influence ==
The Expugnatio Hibernica and its translations circulated throughout the Middle Ages and early modern periods and were widely disseminated in Ireland and England, influencing politics both in medieval times and in the early modern era. English historians considered them authoritative until the seventeenth century, when they came to the attention of Irish apologists who aggressively disputed their validity.

=== Late medieval period ===
It was circulated among the gentry of English Ireland and used as a record of the foundation of the colony and as a family history. It was used to celebrate the ancestors of Anglo-Norman settlers, to justify their political prominence and, more contentiously, to support claims of moral superiority over the Irish and to justify their conquest and subjugation.

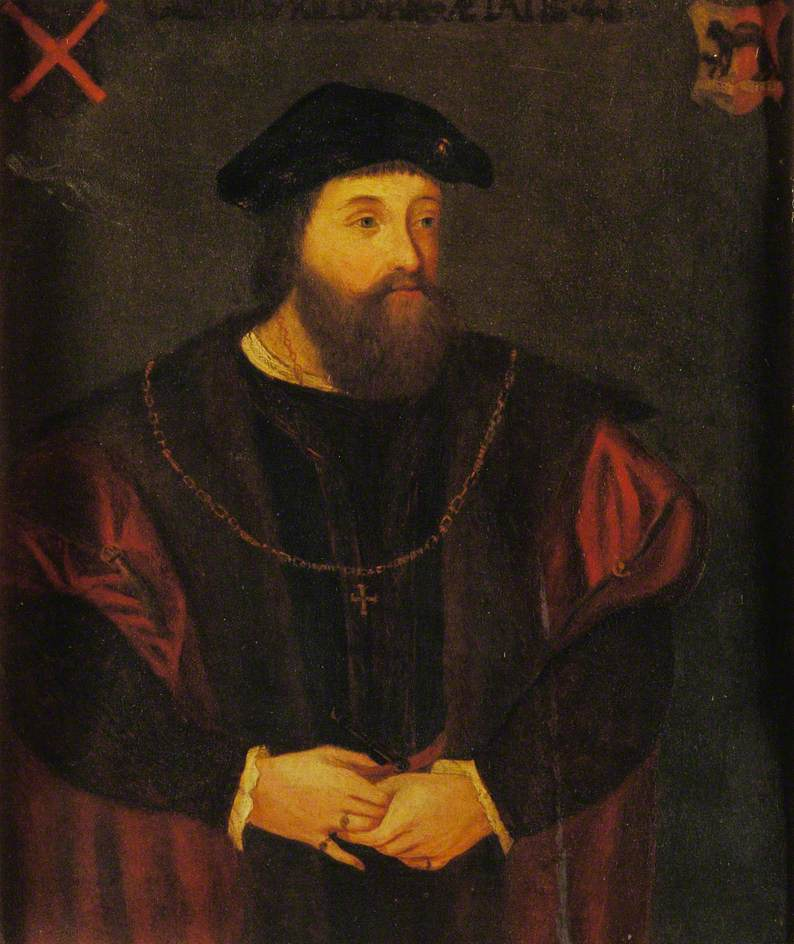
Gerard FitzGerald, 9th Earl of Kildare

It was also used to emphasise the English nature of the colony and rebut accusations of gaelicisation, while in Gaelic Ireland the Expugnatio Hibernica was rejected along with the English claims, and arguments against it can be seen in the Remonstrance of the Irish Princes, written in 1317 for Domhnall Ua Néill.

Copies were owned by prominent Hiberno-Norman lords. A 1531 catalogue of the library of Gerald FitzGerald, 9th Earl of Kildare, indicates he owned both an English and Gaelic copy of the Expugnatio Hibernica, and a copy was also owned by the Ormonds. The Preston family of Gormanston owned a single-folio copy of the rights chapter (Bodleian Library, MS Laud Misc. 526), and reference to these rights was used for political purposes; in 1421 James Butler, the fourth earl of Ormond, used it to support arguments for a new military campaign in Ireland.

It was also used as a source by other medieval writers, with Nicholas Canny remarking that it was used in "literally scores of compositions by English or Old English authors", including Ranulf Higden who acknowledged its contributions to his popular fourteenth century work Polychronicon.

=== Early modern use ===
In the early modern era the Expugnatio Hibernica was used for political purposes to justify English rights to Ireland, including in the 1569 bill of attainder for Shane O'Neill which summarised its rights argument and provided a brief account of the conquest.

Many early writings echoed tropes present in Gerald's work, denigrating the Irish and repeating his claims of English rights to Ireland. Raphael Holinshed's 1577 work the Chronicles of England, Scotland, and Ireland describes itself as owing an "immense" debt to Gerald's works and William Camden's Britannia also echoes Gerald. In 1584 Richard Stanihurst published De Rebus in Hibernia Gestis, with the Expugnatio Hibernica as the principal source. In it Stanihurst references Gerald's work to comment on the questions of his day regarding the counter-reformation, the Irish question, and the alienation of the Anglo-Irish nobility from the English crown.

The 1602 and 1603 printing of the Expugnatio Hibernica in Frankfurt, along with a number of Gerald's other works, provoked a reaction from Irish apologists and the earliest studies of his work come from them in strongly polemical writings produced throughout the seventeenth century, most significantly in John Lynch's Cambrensis Eversus published in 1662, but also by others including Stephen White in his Apologia pro Hibernica.

Geoffrey Keating's Foras Feasa ar Éirinn described Gerald as a "false historian" and compared him to a dung beetle, although he did rely on both the Expugnatio Hibernica and the Topographia Hibernica for some historical details. Irish historians of the period generally considered it a concoction of lies, although some considered him a legitimate but fallible source for the conquest.

== Modern scholarship ==
The Expugnatio Hibernica is considered to be possibly the most influential work regarding the history of medieval Ireland, and is the main source of information about the invasion. Colin Veach describes Gerald's work as so prominent that it is impossible to investigate the first two decades of the conquest without encountering it, and F. X. Martin wrote "Anybody concerned with medieval Irish history has to deal with Giraldus Cambrensis".

Caoimhe Whelan describes it as indispensable and "the history of the invasion", as well as "a work of propaganda par excellence" while Robert Bartlett says that without the Expugnatio Hibernica our knowledge of the Norman invasion of Ireland would be "only a pale shadow of what it is" and describes it as presenting a "vivid and credible picture" of twelfth-century warfare and colonial expansion. It received less attention than the Topographia Hibernica until modern times but is now considered to have greater scholarly value, despite Gerald himself considering the Topographia Hibernica to be of greater worth.

Modern scholars have described the Expugnatio Hibernica as a flawed work, biased both towards Gerald's family and against the Irish which it treats unfairly. W. R. Jones says that while Gerald can appear naive and credulous, his work also contains an "exceptional degree of perceptiveness", while Anne Duggan calls it "an amalgam of accurate reporting and tendentious manipulation of the truth". Scott and Martin describe it as neither perfect nor the "concoction of impudent lies" that earlier Irish scholars had considered it.

Other scholars have considered it through the lens of colonialism. Matthew Vernon argues that Gerald should be read as a "colonised intellectual" and Michael A. Faletra argues that his avoidance of detailing history in terms of a genealogical series of kings and dynasties is due to his own unwillingness to confront his own Welsh ancestry. Gerald writes about Ireland from the perspective of an invader and Cohen contrasts his Irish works with his Welsh writings, describing them as "reductive texts that unabashedly glorify the invasion of the land, demonstrating none of the conflicted identifications characteristic of the Welsh texts."

Sean Duffy has compared the work to later works of colonial justification, with it presenting the Irish way of life in the same manner later authors would present the Aboriginal Australian or Native American way of life. He describes the Expugnatio Hibernica as "the defence produced by the agent of an invading and conquering army to justify its actions in dispossessing the native peoples, seizing and colonising their lands, and, if necessary, bringing their way of life to an end".
