= Maurice FitzGerald, Lord of Llanstephan =

Anglo-Norman nobleman

Maurice FitzGerald
- Lord of Maynooth, Naas and Llanstephan
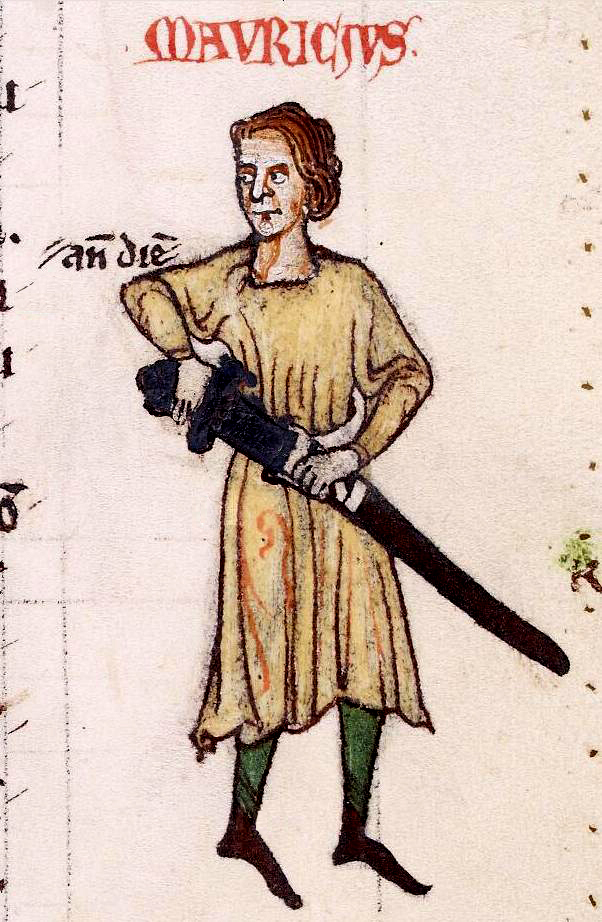
- A drawing of Maurice FitzGerald from a manuscript of the Expugnatio Hibernica, an account of the 1169 invasion of Ireland written in 1189 by Maurice's nephew, Gerald of Wales
- Born: c. 1105; Carew, Pembrokeshire, Wales
- Died: 1 September 1176; Wexford, Ireland
- Wars and battles: Siege of Wexford (1169); Battle of Crug Mawr; Norman invasion of Ireland
- Noble family: FitzGerald
- Spouse: Alice de Montgomery
- Issue: Thomas FitzMaurice; Gerald FitzMaurice; William FitzMaurice; Maurice FitzMaurice; Alexander FitzMaurice; Robert FitzMaurice; Nesta FitzMaurice
- Parents: Gerald FitzWalter; Nest ferch Rhys

Maurice FitzGerald (c. 1105 (Note: He was born almost certainly not at Windsor Castle; more likely Carew in Wales.) – c. September 1176) was Lord of Maynooth, Naas and Llanstephan. He was a medieval Cambro-Norman baron and a major figure in the Norman invasion of Ireland.

== Wars in Wales and Ireland ==
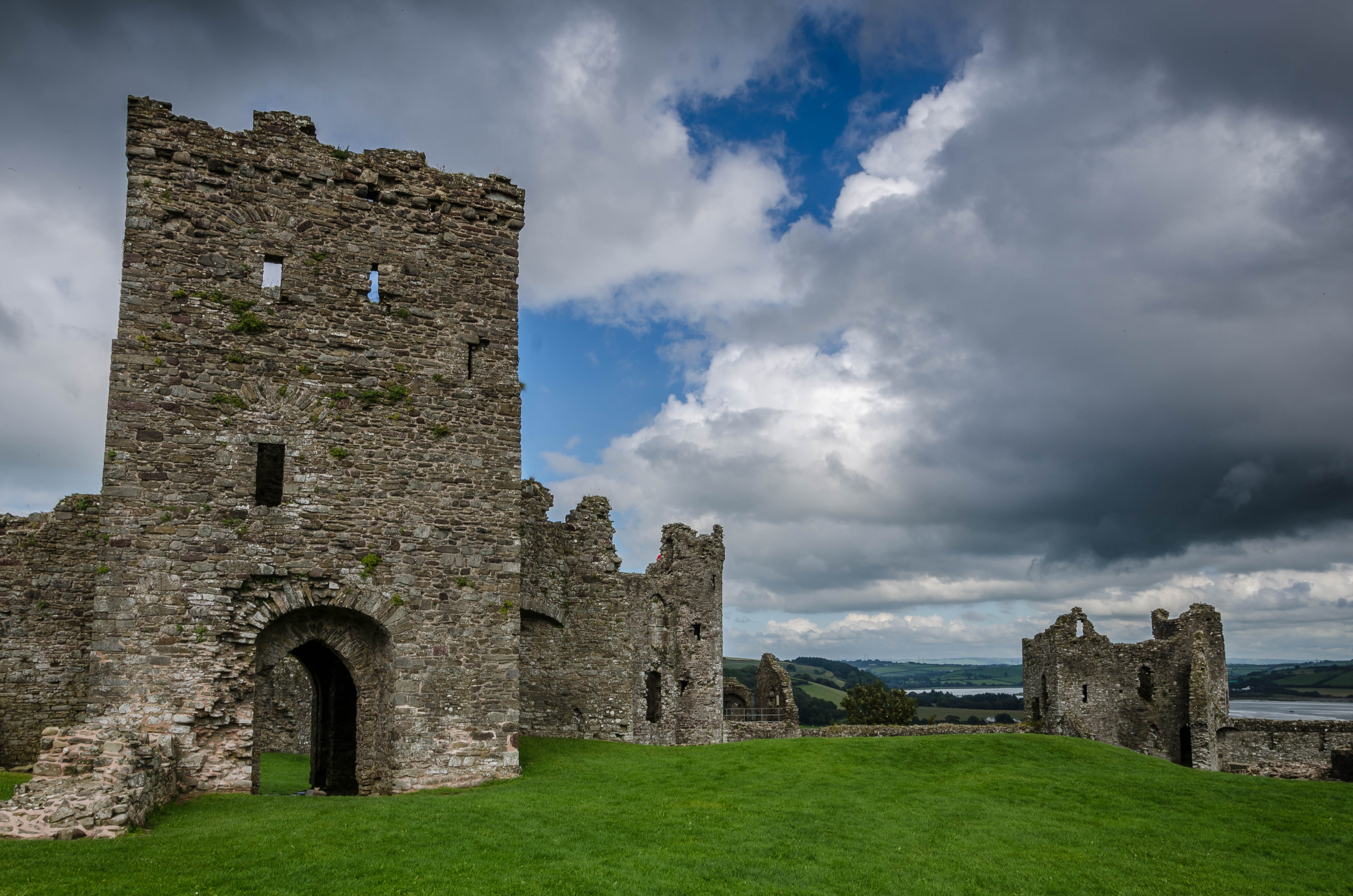
Llanstephan Castle

A Welsh Marcher Lord, Lord Llanstephan had fought alongside his older brother William FitzGerald, and half-brother Robert FitzStephen, constable of Cardigan, under Robert FitzMartin at the Battle of Crug Mawr in Wales in 1136.

Llansteffan Castle overlooks the River Tywi estuary where it enters Carmarthen Bay. It was captured by Maredudd ap Gruffydd in 1146 against the forces of Maurice FitzGerald and his brother William, Lord of Emlyn who were the leading Norman settlers of the region. The castle was retaken by the Normans in 1158.

Diarmait Mac Murchada (Dermot MacMurrough), the deposed King of Leinster who had been exiled by the High King of Ireland, sought Cambro-Norman assistance to regain his throne. Lord Llanstephan participated in the resulting 1169 Norman invasion of Ireland. He assisted his younger half-brother Robert Fitz-Stephen in the Siege of Wexford. His nephew Raymond was Strongbow's second-in-command and had the chief share both in the capture of Waterford and in the successful assault on Dublin in 1171. Lord Lanstephan and his sons the FitzMaurices also fought in this battle.

== Marriage and issue ==
Maurice FitzGerald, Lord Llanstephan is known to have married Alice de Montgomery, a daughter of Arnulf de Montgomery. It has been asserted by eminent authorities that Arnulf left, by his wife, Lafracoth, a daughter, Alice, and that she was later the wife of Maurice FitzGerald, son of Gerald FitzWalter (Gerald of Windsor). By Maurice, one of the first conquerors of Ireland, who died in 1176, she was the mother of Gerald (died 1205), who laid the fortunes of the FitzGeralds of Kildare. (Even Curtis—referenced below—says he cannot find a source for Alice and, on the whole, she seems a) unlikely to have existed and b) impossible for Maurice to have met.) Alice herself was living in 1171, and was then in Ireland with her husband and sons. Maurice FitzGerald, by his wife Alice, had the following children:

- Thomas FitzMaurice, Lord OConnello (d. 1213)
- Gerald FitzMaurice, 1st Lord of Offaly (1150–1204)
- William FitzMaurice, 1st Lord of Naas (d. 1199)
- Maurice FitzMaurice, 1st Lord of Kiltrany
- Alexander FitzMaurice
- Robert FitzMaurice
- Nesta FitzMaurice (m. Hervey de Montmorenci, Constable of England)

Lord Llanstephan's second eldest son Gerald FitzMaurice, the 1st Lord of Offaly was the progenitor of the FitzGerald and FitzMaurice Earls of Kildare and Dukes of Leinster.

The original Earldom of Desmond in the province of Munster was based on landholdings belonging to the descendants of Maurice's eldest son Thomas FitzMaurice, Lord OConnello. Thomas's son John FitzMaurice FitzThomas, who was killed in the Battle of Callann, became the 1st Baron Desmond. Others from this line include the Knights of Glin and Knights of Kerry.

== Ancestry ==
Maurice FitzGerald, Lord Llanstephan was the second-eldest son of Gerald FitzWalter known as Gerald de Windsor, Constable of Pembroke by his wife, Nest ferch Rhys, Princess of Deheubarth and a member of the Welsh royal House of Dinefwr.

Ancestors of Maurice FitzGerald, Lord of Llanstephan

Otho
Walter FitzOther
Gerald de Windsor, Constable of Pembroke Castle
Beatrice
Maurice FitzGerald, Lord of Llanstephan
Tewdwr ap Cadell
Rhys ap Tewdwr of the House of Dinefwr, King of Deheubarth
Nest ferch Rhys, Princess of Deheubarth
Rhiwallon ap Cynfyn of Powys
Gwladys ferch Rhiwallon of Powys

== Citations ==
- Chandler, Victoria (1989), "The last of the Montgomerys: Roger the Poitevin and Arnulf", Historical Research, 62 (147): 1–14, doi:10.1111/j.1468-2281.1989.tb01075.x.
- Cokayne, George Edward, ed. (1890), Complete peerage of England, Scotland, Ireland, Great Britain and the United Kingdom, extant, extinct or dormant (D to F), vol. 3 (1st ed.), London: George Bell & Sons, p. 358
- Curtis, Edmund (1921), "Murchertach O'Brien, high king of Ireland, and his Norman son-in-law, Arnulf de Mont-Gomery, circa 1100", The Journal of the Royal Society of Antiquaries of Ireland, 6, 11 (2): 116–124, JSTOR 25513221.
- Fitzgerald, Charles William (1858), The earls of Kildare, and their ancestors (2nd ed.), Hodges, Smith, & Company.
- Graves, James (1869), "No. 2. the earls of Desmond", The Journal of the Historical and Archaeological Association of Ireland, 3, 1 (2): 459–498, JSTOR 25497799.
- Paul, James Balfour, ed. (1906), The Scots peerage, vol. 3, David Douglas.
- Round, John Horace (1911). "Fitzgerald" . In Chisholm, Hugh (ed.). Encyclopædia Britannica. Vol. 10 (11th ed.). Cambridge University Press. pp. 441–443.
- Thompson, Kathleen (2004). "Montgomery, Arnulf de (c.1066–1118x22)". Oxford Dictionary of National Biography. Oxford Dictionary of National Biography (online ed.). Oxford University Press. doi:10.1093/ref:odnb/696. (Subscription, Wikipedia Library access or UK public library membership required.). (subscription, Wikipedia Library access or UK public library membership required)
