= Maurice de Prendergast =

12th century Cambro-Norman commander

- Born: Prendergast, Pembrokeshire, Wales
- Died: 1205; Ireland

Maurice de Prendergast was a Norman knight.

Maurice was from Prendergast, now in Haverfordwest, Wales, and was hired in 1169 by the ruler of the Irish kingdom of Osraige, Domnall Mac Gilla Pátraic, to resist the Leinster king, Diarmait Mac Murchada, who had also recruited Norman aid. He afterwards participated in the Norman invasion of Ireland. He was one of the first members of the expedition to land in Bannow Bay in May 1169, along with Meiler FitzHenry and Miles FitzDavid. He took part in the Siege of Wexford. In 1185 he was the first governor at Ardfinnan Castle for Prince John of England and was granted the Manor of Ardfinnan.

F.X. Martin in the Expugnatio Hibernica states that "the first edition of the Expugnatio has no reference to the arrival of Maurice de Prendergast but the later edition include the information that Maurice de Prendergast came the following day, was a valiant soldier from Rhos in South Wales, embarked at Milford with ten men-at-arms and a large body of archers in two ships, and that he also landed at Bannow".

Maurice de Prendergast was reputedly granted lands in south County Mayo, and the town of Claremorris named after him.
