= Siege of Wexford (1169) =

12th century battle in Ireland

- Part of the Norman Invasion of Ireland
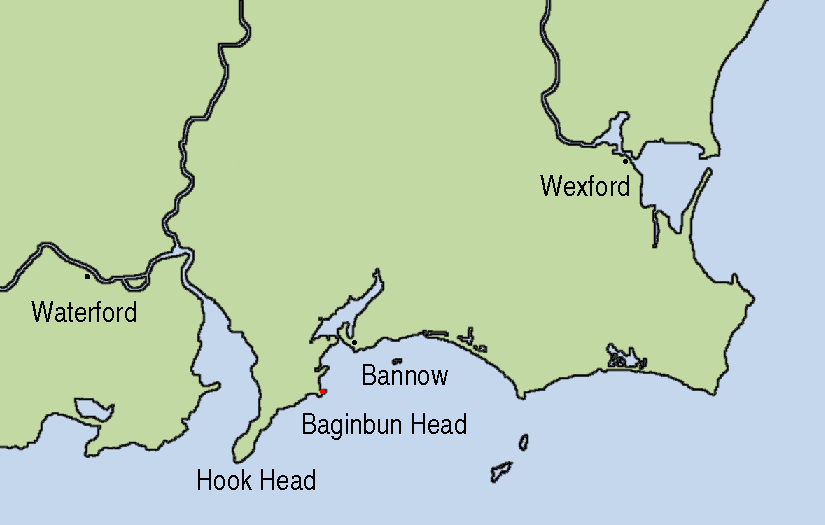
Date	May 1169
Location	Wexford 52°20′03″N 6°27′27″W
Result	Norman victory
Territorial changes	Wexford and part of southeast Leinster comes under Norman control

Belligerents
Normans	Norse-Gaels of Wexford

Commanders and leaders
Robert FitzStephen; Diarmait Mac Murchada	Unknown

Strength
900–1,000 Including: 500 Irish allies	~2,000

Casualties and losses
18 killed	3 killed, several ships destroyed

The siege of Wexford took place in early May 1169 and was the first major clash of the Norman invasion of Ireland. The town was besieged by a combined force of Normans under Robert Fitz-Stephen and soldiers loyal to Diarmait mac Murchadha. After being ousted as King of Leinster, Diarmait had recruited the Normans to help him regain control of Leinster and the semi-independent Norse-Gaelic seaport of Wexford. Although the attackers did not breach the town's walls, Wexford surrendered after almost two days and came under Norman control.

== Background ==
In 1167, Diarmait Mac Murchada had been deposed as King of Leinster (Irish: Laighin) and exiled from Ireland by the High King of Ireland, Ruaidrí Ua Conchobair and his ally Tigernán Ua Ruairc. Diarmait was determined to regain his kingdom and become High King himself. He fled to France and asked for military aid from the Anglo-Norman King of England, Henry II. Henry authorized Diarmait to seek help from the Anglo-Norman and Cambro-Norman lords in his kingdom. Those who agreed to help included Richard de Clare (nicknamed "Strongbow") and half-brothers Robert Fitz-Stephen and Maurice FitzGerald. Fitz-Stephan was accompanied by his half-nephew Robert de Barry. Strongbow was offered Diarmait's daughter Aoife in marriage and promised the kingship of Leinster on Diarmait's death. Robert and Maurice were promised lands in Wexford and elsewhere for their services.

About 1 May 1169, Fitz-Stephen landed at Bannow Bay with a force of 30 knights, 60 armsmen and 300 bowmen. The next day, Maurice de Prendergast landed at the same spot with ten knights and 60 bowmen. This force merged with about 500 soldiers commanded by Diarmait and marched to Wexford (Loch Garman).

== Skirmish at Duncormick ==
On its way to Wexford, the army was confronted by Gaels or Norse-Gaels at Duncormac (Dún Cormaic). After a short skirmish, it fought its way across the river and continued northeastwards to Wexford. It is unknown what casualties were inflicted. The 1971 Capuchin Annual (page 399) argues that this skirmish "deserves greater respect in history than it has got" because it was "the first battle of the Norman invasion, the first attempt to stop the foreigners, the first bloody encounter in a struggle which was to endure for eight hundred years".

== Siege ==
Wexford had got news of the approaching army and prepared to fight the invaders on open ground outside the town. However, upon realizing the strength of its opposition, the defenders burnt their outbuildings (so that the attackers would have no cover) and withdrew behind the walls. Gerald de Barri claimed that the defenders numbered about 2,000.

The first attack on Wexford was repulsed at the loss of 18 Normans and 3 defenders. These are believed to have been the only deaths during the siege. Fitz-Stephen then ordered his men to burn all the ships in the town's harbour. The next morning, the attack on Wexford began again. Shortly after, the defenders sent envoys to Diarmait. The defenders agreed to surrender and renew their allegiance to Diarmait. It is claimed that they were persuaded to surrender by two bishops who were in the town at the time.

== Aftermath ==
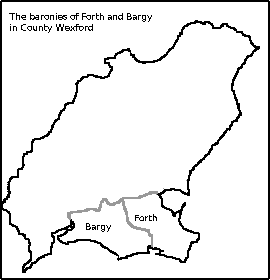
The baronies of Forth and Bargy - this land was granted to Norman commander Robert Fitz-Stephen after the siege

The besieging army and its commanders garrisoned at Ferns (Fearna), Diarmait's headquarters. Fitz-Stephen was granted ownership of Wexford and a large area of land corresponding to the modern baronies of Forth and Bargy. This would become the first Norman colony in Ireland.

After about three weeks of inactivity, Diarmait and Fitz-Stephen's forces attacked the territory of Osraighe (anglicized Ossory) on Leinster's western border. They then launched raids to the north, in the territories of the Uí Tuathail, the Uí Broin and the Uí Conchobhair. High King Ruaidhrí Ua Conchobhair marched his forces into Leinster and, with the mediation of the Church, the commanders of the two armies began negotiations at Ferns. An agreement was reached, whereby Diarmait was allowed to remain King of Leinster if he recognized Ruaidhrí as High King and if he agreed to send his Norman allies back to Britain. Although relative peace followed, Diarmait allowed the Normans to remain in Leinster. In May 1170, a second wave of Normans arrived and restarted the invasion.
