= Siege of Dublin (1171) =

Battle during Norman invasion of Ireland

- Part of the Anglo-Norman invasion of Ireland
Date	August–September 1171
Location	City of Dublin
Result	Norman victory

Belligerents
High King of Ireland's forces	Normans

Commanders and leaders
Ruaidrí Ua Conchobair	Richard de Clare

Strength
30,000 to 60,000 (dubious claims)	500

Casualties and losses
1,500 killed	1 wounded

The siege of Dublin was an unsuccessful attempt of the last high king of Ireland, Ruaidrí Ua Conchobair, to capture the City of Dublin from the Anglo-Normans in 1171.

Ua Conchobair was able to gather sixty-thousand men for his cause, meanwhile, the city was held by Strongbow; who had proven his martial prowess just a few months prior, when another Irish army had attempted to seize the city, but Strongbow had been able to drive the besiegers off with a sally.

Ua Conchobair divided his forces into four camps and during the night Strongbow led a surprise attack on Ua Conchobair's camp, killing a thousand and a half, causing the rest of Irish forces to rout.
