= Anglo-Norman invasion of Ireland =

12th-century invasion

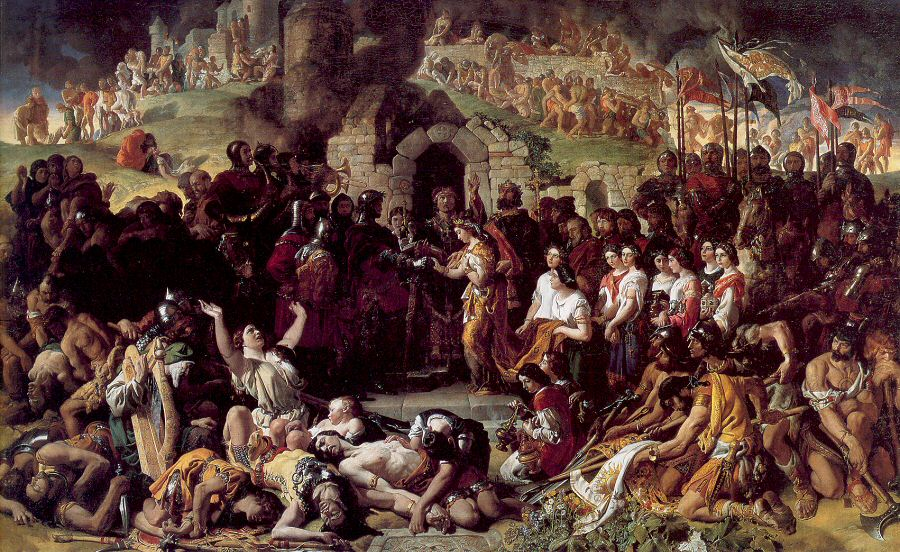
- The Marriage of Strongbow and Aoife (1854), by Daniel Maclise
Date	1169 – 1177
Location	Ireland
Result	Treaty of Windsor (1175); partial Norman victory
Territorial changes	Large swathes of Ireland absorbed into the Lordship of Ireland

Belligerents
Angevin Empire: Anglo-Norman mercenaries (until 1171); Kingdom of England (from 1171)	Gaelic Ireland

Commanders and leaders
Henry II; Richard de Clare	Ruaidrí Ua Conchobair

The Anglo-Norman invasion of Ireland took place during the late 12th century, when Anglo-Normans gradually conquered and acquired large swathes of land in Ireland over which the kings of England then claimed sovereignty. The Anglo-Normans claimed the invasion was sanctioned by the papal bull Laudabiliter. At the time of the invasion, Gaelic Ireland consisted of several kingdoms, with a High King claiming lordship over most of the other kings. The Anglo-Norman invasion was a watershed in Ireland's history, marking the beginning of over 800 years of British presence in Ireland.

In May 1169, Anglo-Norman mercenaries landed in Ireland at the request of Diarmait mac Murchada (Dermot MacMurragh), the deposed King of Leinster, who sought their help in regaining his kingship. They achieved this within weeks and raided neighbouring kingdoms. This military intervention was sanctioned by King Henry II of England. In return, Diarmait had sworn loyalty to Henry and promised land to the Normans.

In 1170, there were further Norman landings, led by the Earl of Pembroke, Richard "Strongbow" de Clare. They seized the important Norse-Irish towns of Dublin and Waterford, and Strongbow married Diarmait's daughter Aoífe. Diarmait died in May 1171, and Strongbow claimed Leinster, which Diarmait had promised him. Led by High King Ruaidrí Ua Conchobair (Rory O'Conor), a coalition of most of the Irish kingdoms besieged Dublin, while Norman-held Waterford and Wexford were also attacked. However, the Normans managed to hold most of their territory.

In October 1171, King Henry landed with a large army to assert control over both the Anglo-Normans and the Irish. This intervention was supported by the Roman Catholic Church, who saw it as a means of ensuring Irish religious reform, and a source of taxes. At the time, Irish marriage laws conflicted with those of the broader Church, and the Gregorian Reform had not been fully implemented. Henry granted Strongbow Leinster as a fiefdom, declared the Norse-Irish towns to be crown land, and arranged the synod of Cashel to reform the Irish church. Many Irish kings also submitted to him, likely in the hope that he would curb Norman expansion, but Henry granted the unconquered kingdom of Meath to Hugh de Lacy. After Henry's departure in 1172, fighting between the Normans and Irish continued.

The 1175 Treaty of Windsor acknowledged Henry as overlord of the conquered territory and Ruaidrí as overlord of the remainder of Ireland, with Ruaidrí also swearing fealty to Henry. The treaty soon collapsed: Norman lords continued to invade Irish kingdoms and the Irish continued to attack the Normans. In 1177, Henry adopted a new policy. He declared his son John to be the "Lord of Ireland" (i.e. claiming the whole island) and authorised the Norman lords to conquer more land. The territory they held became the Lordship of Ireland, part of the Angevin Empire. The Normans' success has been attributed to military superiority and fortress-building, the lack of a unified opposition from the Irish and the support of the Church for Henry's intervention.

== Background ==
In the 12th century, Gaelic Ireland was made up of several over-kingdoms, which each comprised several lesser kingdoms. At the top was the High King, who received tribute from the other kings but did not rule Ireland as a unitary state, though it had a common culture and legal system. The five port towns of Dublin, Wexford, Waterford, Cork, and Limerick were inhabited by the Norse-Irish and had their own rulers.

The Normans conquered England between 1066 and 1075, with all earldoms thereafter held by Normans, as were all bishoprics after 1096. In parallel, the Treaty of Abernethy created a limited settlement between the Norman conquerors and Scotland, with lands in Cumbria exchanged for peace. Over the following decades, Norman lords conquered much of south Wales and established their own semi-independent lordships there. According to historian John Gillingham, after the Norman conquest, an imperialist attitude emerged among England's new French-speaking ruling elite, and they came to view their Celtic neighbours as inferior and barbarous.

=== Early Norman designs and contacts ===
It is thought that the Dublin-Leinster army in the 1014 Battle of Clontarf may have included troops from the Duchy of Normandy.

After the Norman Conquest of England in 1066, the Normans became aware of the role Ireland played in providing refuge and assistance to their enemies. They also contemplated the conquest of Ireland. It is recorded in the Anglo-Saxon Chronicle that if William the Conqueror had lived for two more years (until 1089) "he would have conquered Ireland by his prudence and without any weapons". William's son, William II, is stated as having said "For the conquest of this land, I will gather all the ships of my kingdom, and will make of them a bridge to cross over".

In September 1155, King Henry II of England held a council at Winchester. According to Robert of Torigni, Henry discussed plans to invade Ireland and grant it to his brother William FitzEmpress as a provision. The Anglo-Norman clergy strongly backed the proposal. The plans came to nothing, allegedly due to opposition from his mother, the Empress Matilda.

There were contacts between the Irish and Normans well before 1169. The Norman lord of Pembroke, Arnulf de Montgomery (d. 1118–22), was the son-in-law of Murtough O'Brien (d. 1119), king of Munster and High King of Ireland. De Montgomery and his family had rebelled against Henry I in 1100 and sought Irish aid. De Montgomery married O'Brien's daughter and obtained the assistance of his fleet, but was still forced to flee to Ireland in 1102. Orderic Vitalis' account says De Montgomery used his troops to aid O'Brien in Ireland and hoping to succeed his father-in-law as king, but had to flee after his hosts turned against him. William of Malmesbury states it was only after the Normans imposed a trade embargo on Ireland that the situation died down and the O'Brien-de Montgomery alliance ended.

From at least 1144, the king of Leinster, Dermot MacMurrough, had been on good terms with the future Henry II. After becoming king of England in December 1154, Henry II had allied with Somerled, Lord of Argyll, and Muirchertach Mac Lochlainn, king of the Cenél nEógain, to put pressure on the new king of Scotland, Malcolm IV. The fruits of this alliance saw Malcolm cede parts of Scotland to England in 1157 and make peace with Somerled in 1160. In Ireland, Mac Lochlainn invaded the Kingdom of Breifne, forced the submission Rory O'Connor, king of Connacht, and in 1161 gave MacMurrough eastern Meath. For six months in 1165, the fleet of Dublin, which was under the control of Dermot MacMurrough, was used to aid Henry II's forces in an abortive campaign in north Wales.

=== Role of the church ===
Some of the initiative for political and military intervention came from Anglo-Norman church leaders – especially Theobald, Archbishop of Canterbury – who wanted to control the Irish church and fully implement the Gregorian Reforms. Irish church leaders had legislated for reform, notably at the synods of Cashel (1101), Ráth Breasail (1111) and Kells (1152). These reforms, intended to tighten attitudes towards marriage, clerical celibacy, the sacramental system, and control of church lands and offices, "would demand the abandonment of features of Gaelic society going back to pre-Christian times and of practises which had been accepted for centuries by the church in Ireland." Implementing the reforms was slow and difficult.

At the Synod of Kells, the church of Canterbury had its claims to primacy over the Irish church dismissed by Pope Eugene III, who felt the Irish church could handle its own affairs. This did not go down well with the Anglo-Norman clergy. In 1155 John of Salisbury, Secretary to the Archbishop of Canterbury, and good friends with the recently elected Anglo-Norman Pope Adrian IV, made an "extraordinary intervention" at the Roman Curia. He called for Norman involvement in Ireland to reform its "barbaric and impious" people. This resulted in the papal bull Laudabiliter, or an equivalent, which purported to grant Henry II papal authority to intervene in Ireland, such as by conquest. Salisbury had been inspired in his views on the Irish by the "Life of Malachy", written by Malachy's friend, Bernard of Clairvaux.

This hagiography, written within a year of Malachy's death in 1148, depicted the Irish, in fact highly Christianised, in exaggerated terms as barbaric, semi-pagan and in need of reform. Historian F. X. Martin writes that Ireland was "barbaric" in Bernard's eyes because it "had retained its own culture and had remained outside the Latin secular world". This depiction of Ireland and the Irish became established as the mainstream view throughout Europe.

== Landings of 1169 ==
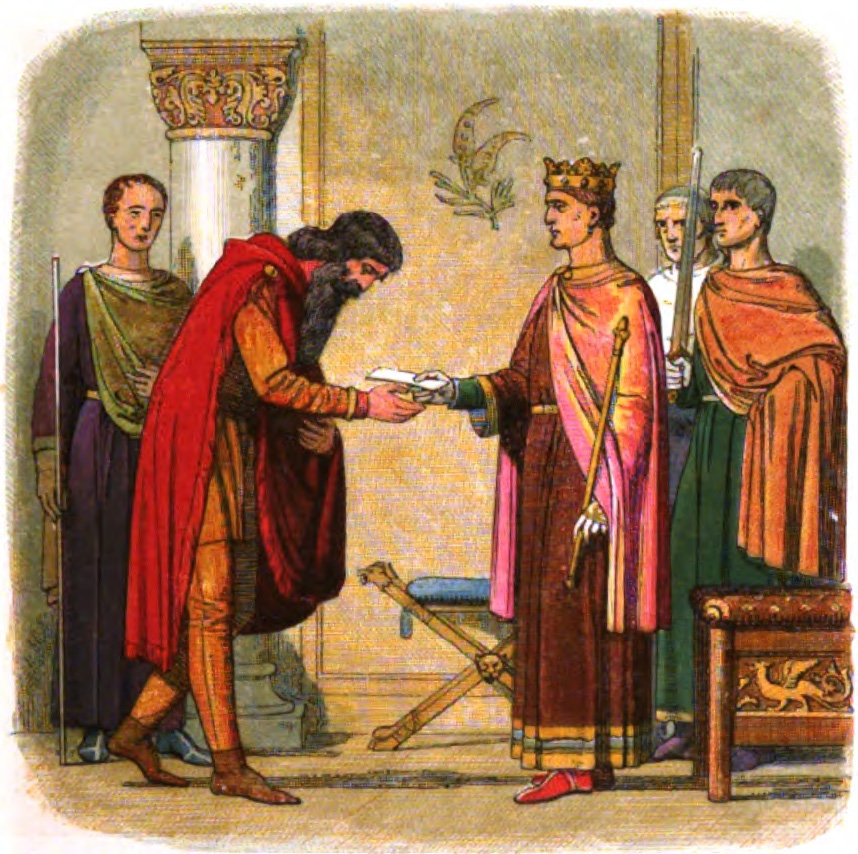
"Henry authorizes Dermod to levy forces", from A Chronicle of England (1864) by James Doyle

In 1166, Ruaidrí Ua Conchobair (Rory O'Connor), king of Connacht, was acknowledged as High King of Ireland by most of the Irish kings. He led a coalition—that included Tigernán Ua Ruairc (Tiernan O'Rourke) of Bréifne (Breffny), Diarmait Ua Maelsechlainn (Dermot O'Melaghlin) of Míde (Meath), the Norse-Irish of Dublin, and several Leinster princes—which ousted Diarmait mac Murchada (Dermot MacMurragh) as king of Leinster for having abducted Dervorgilla, the wife of Tiernan O'Rourke, King of Breifne, 15 years prior. Diarmait refusing to accept his fate sailed from Ireland on the 1 August for Bristol with his daughter Aoife and sought help from Henry II in regaining his kingship. Henry gave Diarmait permission to recruit forces and authorised his subjects to help Diarmait, in return for Diarmait swearing loyalty to Henry. Among other benefits, a loyal Diarmait restored to power would allow the fleet of Dublin to be used in Anglo-Norman campaigns against the Welsh and Scots.

Several Marcher Lords agreed to help: Richard FitzGilbert de Clare (also known as Strongbow), Robert FitzStephen, Maurice FitzGerald, and Maurice de Prendergast. Diarmait promised Strongbow his daughter Aoífe in marriage and the kingship of Leinster upon Diarmait's death. He promised Robert and Maurice the town of Wexford and two neighbouring cantreds. Under Irish law, Diarmait had no right to do this. Having secured their help, he returned to his home territory of Uí Ceinnselaig (Hy Kinsella) in 1167 with one knight, Richard FitzGodebert, and a small number of soldiers. He smoothly resumed power as chief and awaited the arrival of his allies. King Ruaidrí and Tigernán confronted him with a small force and there was a skirmish at Killistown. Diarmait gave hostages to Ruaidrí and a hundred ounces of gold to Tigernán, and FitzGodebert left Ireland.

On 1 May 1169, Robert FitzStephen and Maurice de Prendergast landed at Bannow Bay, on the south coast of County Wexford, with a force of at least 40 knights, 60 men-at-arms and 360 archers. This force merged with about 500 men led by Diarmait. They set about conquering Leinster and the territories Diarmait had claimed sovereignty over. First they besieged the Norse-Irish seaport of Wexford, which surrendered after two days. They then raided and plundered the territories of north Leinster, which had refused to submit to Diarmait. They also raided the neighbouring kingdom of Ossory, defeating the forces of king Donnchad Mac Gilla Patraic (Donagh MacGillapatrick) in the battle of Achad Úr. However, Donnchad withdrew his forces to safety. Prendergast then announced he was withdrawing from Ireland with his 200 men, but Diarmait would not let them set sail from Wexford. In response, Prendergast offered his men as mercenaries to Donnchad of Ossory, which Donnchad accepted. He used these mercenaries to temporarily subdue Loígis. However, Prendergast refused to fight his former companions, and he soon left Ireland with his men.

In response, High King Ruaidrí led an army into Leinster to confront Diarmait and the Normans. The army included contingents from Connacht, Breffny, Meath, and Dublin, each led by their respective kings. An agreement was reached at Ferns: Diarmait was acknowledged as king of Leinster, in return for acknowledging Ruaidrí as his overlord and agreeing to send his foreign allies away permanently. To ensure compliance, Diarmait agreed to give Ruaidrí hostages, one of whom was his son. However, Diarmait apparently sought to use his Anglo-Norman allies to make himself High King. Shortly after the Ferns agreement, Maurice FitzGerald landed at Wexford with at least 10 knights, 30 mounted archers and 100-foot archers. In a show of strength, Maurice and Diarmait marched an army north and laid waste to the hinterland of Dublin.

== Arrival of Strongbow in 1170 ==
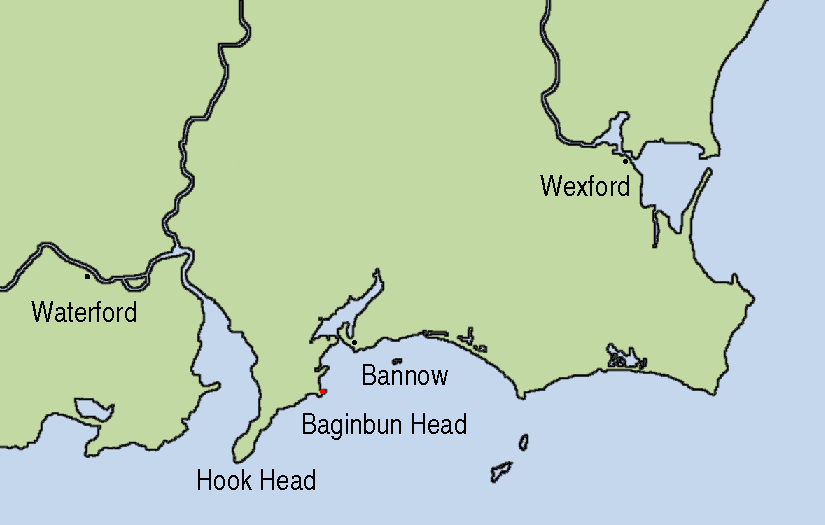
A map showing the locations of Bannow, Baginbun, Wexford and Waterford in southern Ireland

By 1170, Strongbow appears to have been funded financially for his invasion by a Jewish merchant by the name of Josce of Gloucester: "Josce, Jew of Gloucester, owes 100 shillings for an amerciament for the moneys which he lent to those who against the king's prohibition went over to Ireland." In May of that year, Raymond FitzGerald landed at Bannow Bay with at least 10 knights and 70 archers. This was the advance guard for Strongbow's army and was to be the springboard for an assault on Waterford.

Raymond's force occupied an old promontory fort at Baginbun and plundered the surrounding countryside. They were then besieged by a much larger force of Irish and Norse-Irish. The outnumbered Anglo-Normans drove a large herd of cattle into the opposing army. In the ensuing havoc, the Normans routed the besiegers, killing up to 500 and capturing 70. These captives were then executed: the Normans broke their limbs before beheading them and throwing their bodies off the cliff.

On 23 August, Strongbow landed at Passage with at least 200 knights and 1,000 soldiers. They met with Raymond's force and assaulted Waterford. The walls were eventually breached and there followed fierce fighting in the streets, in which 700 defenders were killed. Diarmait and the other Norman commanders then arrived in Waterford, where Strongbow married Diarmait's daughter, Aífe.

The Normans and Diarmait held a council of war at Waterford and agreed to take Dublin. High King Ruaidrí encamped a large army near Dublin to intercept them. As well as troops from Connacht, it included troops from Breffny (led by King Tigernán), Meath (led by King Máel Sechlainn), and Oriel (led by King Murchad Ua Cerbaill). The Normans and Diarmait bypassed them by travelling over the Wicklow Mountains, forcing Ruaidrí's army to abandon their plans.

When they reached Dublin, Diarmait began negotiations with its king, Ascall mac Ragnaill (Ascall MacRannall). On 21 September, while talks were ongoing, a force of Normans—led by Miles de Cogan and Raymond FitzGerald—stormed the town and took it. Ascall and his followers fled in their ships but vowed to re-take the town. Strongbow and Diarmait then launched "a devastating campaign" through Meath and into Breffny, burning Clonard, Kells, and several other monastic towns. In response to these violations of the Ferns agreement, Ruaidrí executed three hostages, including Diarmait's son.

Diarmait returned to Ferns and died there suddenly in May 1171. Strongbow then claimed Leinster, as Diarmait had promised Strongbow he would inherit the kingdom upon his death, as his son-in-law through Aoífe. However, Strongbow would not have been deemed Diarmait's heir under either Irish or English law, with Diarmait having two wives, as well as sons and other daughters. It is suggested that Strongbow's succession was justified in English law by having Aoífe's mother deemed to be Diarmait's only legitimate wife, leaving Aoífe as his only legitimate heir. Furthermore, Strongbow's succession was not justified in Irish law, as succession to kingship was elective, and could only be passed on through the male line. Diarmait's son Domnall Cáemánach (Donal Cavanagh) backed Strongbow, perhaps because he felt it gave his family their best chance of holding on to power. Strongbow gave Domnall jurisdiction over his Irish subjects in most of Leinster.

== Irish counteroffensive of 1171 ==
Shortly after Diarmait's death, the Anglo-Normans came under attack, both from within Leinster and from outside. Diarmait was succeeded as ruler of Uí Ceinnselaig (his home territory) by his brother Murchad, who opposed Strongbow along with other Leinster rulers.> The Irish of Desmond launched a devastating attack on Norman-held Waterford. At about the same time, a Norse-Gaelic army, in a fleet of at least 60 ships, landed outside Dublin. Led by Ascall, they tried to re-take the town, but were repulsed by de Cogan's forces. Ascall was captured and publicly executed.

A great army, led by Ruaidrí, surrounded Dublin. It comprised troops from most of the Irish kingdoms: contingents from Connacht, Breffny (led by King Tigernán), Meath (led by King Máel Sechlainn), Thomond (led by King Domnall Ua Briain), Oriel (led by King Murchad Ua Cerbaill), Ulster (led by King Magnus Mac Duinnsléibe), and Leinster (led by Diarmait's brother Murchad). A Norse-Gaelic fleet of 30 ships, sent by Godred Olafsson, blockaded Dublin bay. Robert FitzStephen sent his best troops out of Wexford to help the Anglo-Norman garrison in Dublin. The remaining garrison in Wexford was then attacked and forced out of the town. The Normans fled to a military encampment at nearby Carrick, where they were besieged. The siege of Dublin went on for two months. There were several skirmishes, but the Irish army apparently sought to starve the city into surrender.

With Dublin and Carrick under siege, Strongbow and his council agreed to negotiate. Strongbow proposed that if the Anglo-Normans were allowed to keep what they had conquered, they would acknowledge Ruaidrí as their overlord. Ruaidrí responded that he would only allow the Normans to keep Dublin, Wexford, and Waterford.> This was unacceptable to Strongbow. A Norman sortie slipped out of Dublin and made a surprise attack on Ruaidrí's camp at Castleknock. The Normans killed hundreds of soldiers, many of whom were resting or bathing, and seized supplies. Following this defeat, the Irish army withdrew. In the meantime, FitzStephen had surrendered to the Norse-Irish at Carrick. When they learned that Strongbow was on his way, they burnt Wexford and withdrew to a nearby island with FitzStephen as a hostage.

== Arrival of Henry II in 1171 ==
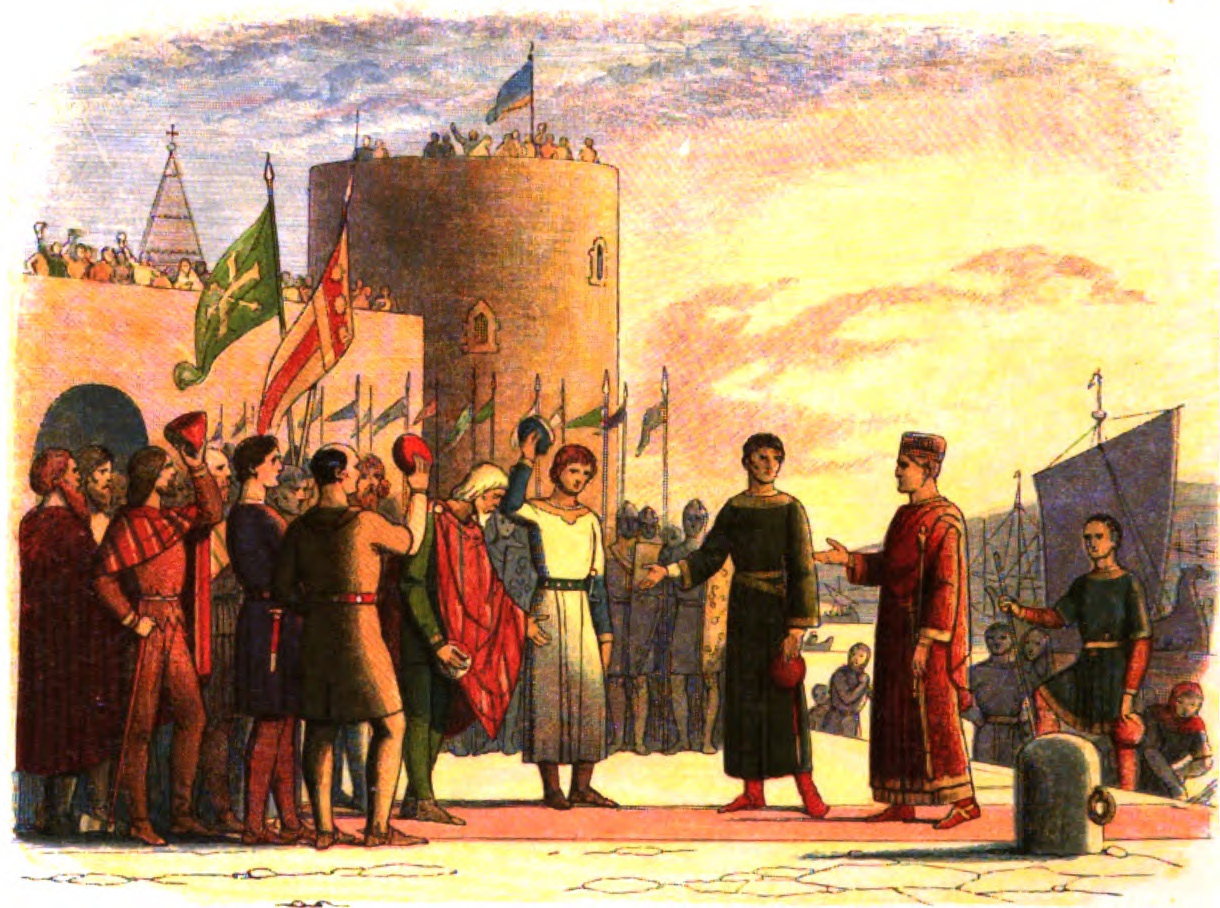
"Henry at Waterford", from A Chronicle of England (1864) by James Doyle

King Henry apparently feared that Strongbow would set up an independent kingdom in Ireland, which could control the Irish Sea and interfere in English affairs. In early 1171, Henry ordered that his subjects return to his realm or all their possessions would be seized. Strongbow reminded Henry that he had gone to Ireland with Henry's permission, to restore Diarmait to the kingship, and that whatever he had gained in Ireland was "by the grace and favour of Henry, and was at his disposal". In July, before the siege of Dublin, Henry granted Strongbow most of the land he had gained and honored him with the post of "royal constable in Ireland".

By September 1171, Henry had decided to lead a military expedition to Ireland, and summoned Strongbow to meet him at Pembroke while the army was assembling. The Song of Dermot and the Earl recounts that the meeting was friendly, while Gerald of Wales pictures the king's anger gradually subsiding until a friendly agreement was reached. Strongbow's actions may have been only a catalyst for Henry's intervention. Historian Peter Crooks writes that, "No less than his predecessors, Henry II was happy to add Ireland to his empire." An English historian of the time, William of Newburgh, wrote that Henry wanted to have "the glory of such a famous conquest" and its proceeds for himself.

On 17 October 1171, King Henry landed at Waterford with a large army of at least 500 mounted knights and 4,000 men-at-arms and archers. Several siege towers were also shipped over, should he need to assault the Norman-held towns, or others such as Cork and Limerick. This was the first time a reigning King of England had set foot on Irish soil, and marked the beginning of England's claim to sovereignty in Ireland. Henry led his army to Lismore, the site of an important monastery, and chose the site for a castle. He then moved on to Cashel, which he had in mind as the venue for a church council. Henry then led his army to Dublin.

The Norman lords affirmed their loyalty to Henry and handed over the territory they had conquered to him. He let Strongbow hold Leinster in fief and declared Dublin, Wexford and Waterford to be crown land. Fifteen Irish kings and chiefs submitted to Henry, likely in the hope that he would curb unprovoked Norman expansion into their territories. Those who did not submit included Ruaidrí (the High King and king of Connacht) and the kings of Meath and the Northern Uí Néill. Against this, the Annals of Tigernach stated that the kings' submissions to Henry II were in two stages; firstly in Waterford by the king of Desmond, and then in Dublin by the kings of Leinster, Meath, Breffny, Oriel and Ulster.

The Irish church hierarchy also submitted to Henry, believing his intervention would bring greater political stability. Henry "used the church as a vehicle of conquest". He organised the synod of Cashel, at which Irish church leaders acknowledged him as their "temporal overlord". This may have been due to their realisation that the Gregorian Reforms were not compatible with Gaelic society. Pope Adrian's successor, Pope Alexander III, sent letters to the Irish bishops, telling them to accept Henry as their overlord in accordance with the oaths sworn by its kings, or face ecclesiastical censure. He ratified the Laudabiliter and purported to give Henry dominion over Ireland, to ensure religious reform and ensure the Irish paid their tax to Rome. The synod sought to bring Irish church practices into line with those of England, and new monastic communities and military orders (such as the Templars) were introduced into Ireland.

Henry granted Meath to Hugh de Lacy; as that kingdom had not been conquered this meant that Henry would let de Lacy hold it if he could conquer it. In early 1172, Henry allowed de Lacy to take royal troops into Meath, where they plundered and burned the monastic towns of Fore and Killeigh. Henry also made Dublin available for the freemen of Bristol to colonise. Many of the Norse-Irish inhabitants were forced to re-settle outside the walls, at what became Oxmantown.

Henry left Ireland on 17 April 1172, setting sail from Wexford. Some English writers – such as William of Canterbury and Ralph Niger – condemned Henry's military intervention, describing it as an unlawful "hostile invasion" and "conquest". A poem in the Welsh Black Book of Carmarthen describes Henry "crossing the salt sea to invade the peaceful homesteads of Ireland", causing "war and confusion". Gerald de Barri felt obliged to refute what he called the "vociferous complaints that the kings of England hold Ireland unlawfully".

== After Henry's departure ==
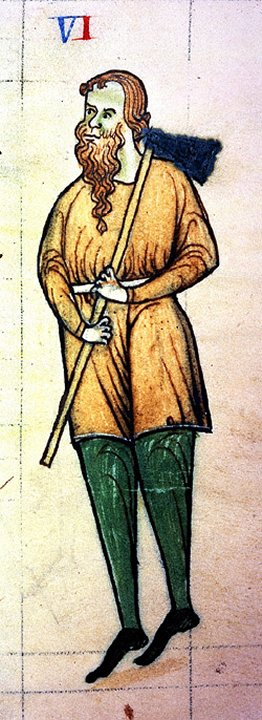
A depiction of Diarmait Mac Murrough.

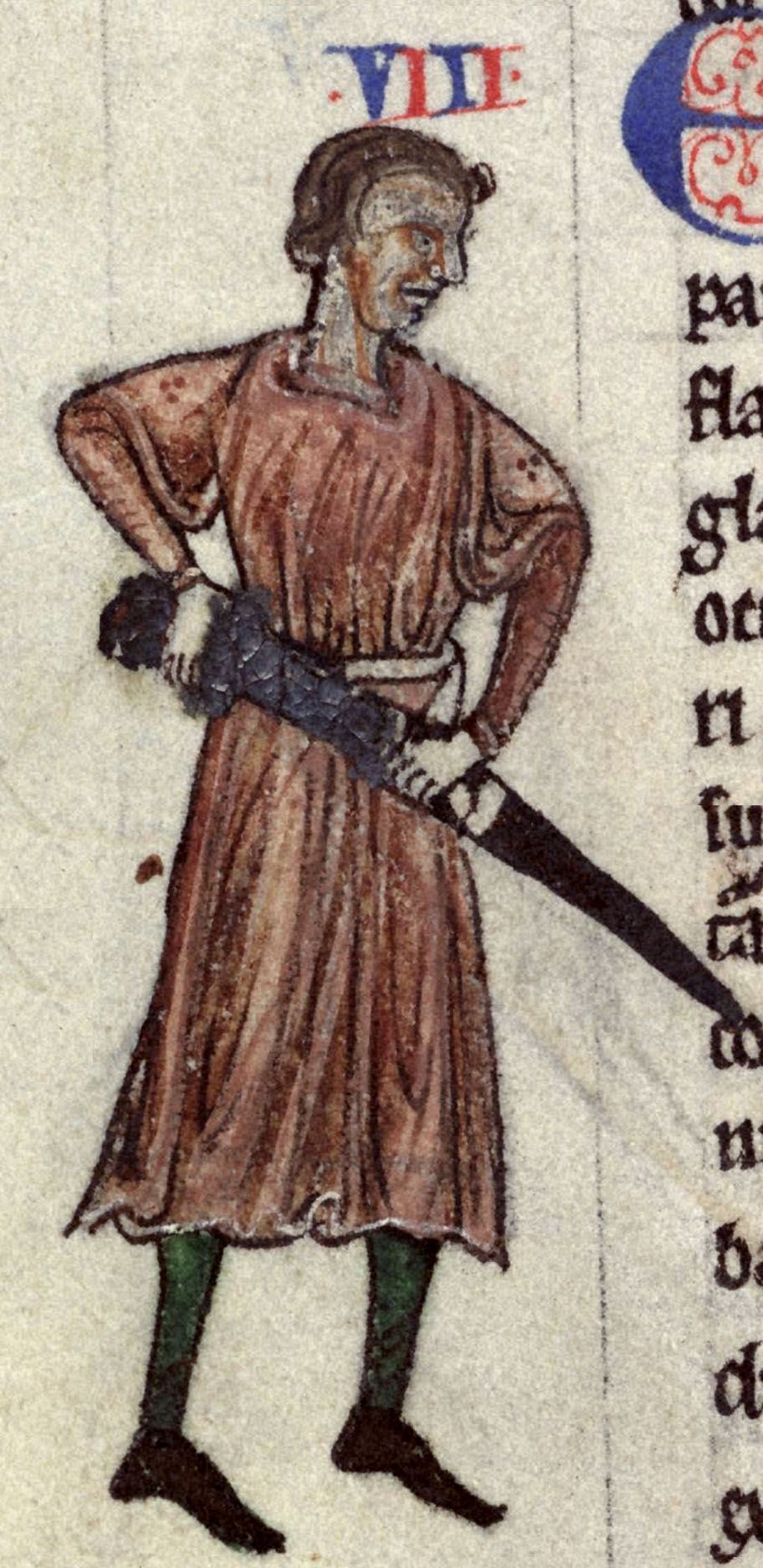
A depiction of Raymond FitzGerald from Gerald de Barri's Expugnatio Hibernica

Shortly after Henry left Ireland, Hugh de Lacy invaded Meath and was confronted by Tigernán Ua Ruairc. The two leaders met on the Hill of Ward for negotiations. During these negotiations, there was a dispute, and de Lacy's men killed Ua Ruairc. His head was then impaled over the gate of Dublin Castle. Strongbow also invaded and plundered Offaly, but failed to subdue it.

In early 1173, many of the Anglo-Norman leaders left Ireland to fight for King Henry in the Revolt of 1173–74. When Raymond FitzGerald returned later that year, he led a successful plundering raid into the kingdom of the Déisi, by both land and sea - even though, as their king had submitted to Henry, the kingdom should have been exempt from attack. The Norman raid on the monastic town of Lismore was interrupted by a Norse-Irish fleet from Cork. After a naval engagement, the Normans withdrew to Waterford. FitzGerald then returned to Wales, due to the death of his father.

In late 1173, Diarmait Mac Murchada's son, Domhnall Caomhánach (Donal Kavanagh), attacked Strongbow's forces in Leinster, killing 200 men. Around the same time, an Irish army from Thomond and Connacht, led by Domnall Ua Briain (Donal O'Brian), forced the Normans out of Kilkenny and destroyed Strongbow's motte-and-bailey castle there. Strongbow responded in early 1174 by marching an army into Thomond and advancing towards Limerick. At the Battle of Thurles, Domnall Ua Briain's forces defeated a contingent of Strongbow's army, killing thousands and forcing him to abandon the march to Limerick.

Norman power in Ireland seemed to be disintegrating, and in the words of Gerald de Barri, "the entire population of Ireland took the opportunity of this disorder to rise with one consent against the English".Shortly after the Norman defeat at Thurles, the Norse-Irish of Waterford rose up and killed the Norman garrison of 200 soldiers. Ruaidrí gathered an army that included contingents from Connacht, Meath, Breffny, Oriel, Ulster, and the Northern Uí Néill, along with their kings. It marched into Meath, destroying the castles at Trim and Duleek, before advancing on Dublin. Raymond FitzGerald landed at Wexford with at least 30 knights, 100 mounted soldiers and 300 archers. When this army arrived at Dublin and reinforced the garrison there, Ruaidrí's army withdrew.

In 1175, the Anglo-Normans rebuilt their castles in Meath and raided or "laid waste" the province from Athlone in the west to Drogheda in the east. They also hanged the Irish king of Meath, Magnus Ua Máel Sechlainn (Manus O'Melaghlin).

=== Treaty of Windsor and Council of Oxford ===
On 6 October 1175, Henry II of England and High King Ruaidrí agreed to the Treaty of Windsor. The treaty divided Ireland into two spheres of influence: Henry was acknowledged as overlord of the Norman-held territory, and Ruaidrí was acknowledged as overlord of the rest of Ireland. Ruaidrí also swore fealty to Henry and agreed to pay him a yearly tribute in cow hides, which Ruaidrí could levy from throughout his kingdom. A Connacht-based annalist reported the treaty in triumphal terms: "Cadla Ua Dubthaig [archbishop of Tuam] came out of England from [Henry] the son of the Empress, having with him the peace of Ireland, and the kingship thereof, both Foreigner and Gael, to Ruaidrí Ua Conchobair".

However, the Windsor Treaty soon fell apart. Henry was "unable or unwilling" to rein in the Anglo-Norman lords, and Ruaidrí was unable to control all of the Irish kings. Contemporary English historian William of Newburgh wrote that "the military commanders left there by him [Henry] for the government of this subjugated province, desirous either of booty or fame, by degrees extended the boundaries allotted to them". In April 1176, a large Anglo-Norman army from Dublin marched north into what is now County Armagh. This was part of Oriel, a kingdom meant to be free from encroachment under the treaty. However, the Irish of Oriel forced the Anglo-Normans to retreat and killed up to 500 of their soldiers. That summer, the forces of Oriel and the Northern Uí Néill, under Cenél nEógain (Kinel Owen), invaded Meath, led by King Mael Sechlainn Mac Lochlainn. They destroyed the castle at Slane and forced the Anglo-Normans to abandon Galtrim, Kells, and Derrypatrick.

Strongbow died in May 1176, and Henry appointed William FitzAldelm as his new representative in Ireland. He was replaced the following year by Hugh de Lacy.

In February 1177, John de Courcy left Dublin with a force of about 22 knights and 500 soldiers. De Courcy swiftly marched north, into the kingdom of Ulaid, and captured the town of Downpatrick. The Ulaid, led by king Ruaidrí Mac Duinnsléibe (Rory MacDunleavy), tried to re-take the town but were repelled after a fierce battle.

King Henry held a council at Oxford in May 1177, which marked a change of policy towards Ireland. He declared his son John (aged ten) to be "Lord of Ireland", and made plans for him to become king of all Ireland when he came of age. The territory held by the Anglo-Normans thus became known as the Lordship of Ireland and formed part of the Angevin Empire. Henry also encouraged the Anglo-Norman lords to conquer more territory. He granted the kingdom of Thomond to Philip de Braose and granted Desmond to Robert FitzStephen and Miles de Cogan.

Over the following months, the Anglo-Normans invaded the kingdoms of Desmond, Thomond, and Connacht, while John de Courcy continued his conquest of east Ulster.

== Cultural and economic effects ==
The arrival of the Normans altered the agricultural landscape of Ireland. Elements that appear afterwards include: large-scale hay-making; cultivated pears and cherries; larger white-fleeced breeds of sheep; and the introduction of various animals such as rabbits, perch, pike and carp.

Another economic effect was the widespread usage of coinage, originally introduced by the Vikings. In the late 1180s, during John's lordship, the first Norman coins in Ireland were minted. Other mints operated in the major towns, with De Courcy in Ulster even minting coins in his own name.

Whether as a direct consequence of the Normans or not, the commoner's independence decreased in both Norman and Gaelic areas. Where once they could serve more than one lord or even transfer from one lord to another, they were now unfree tenants bound to the land.

The Normans also instigated the widespread building of castles by aristocrats, a key component of the feudal system they brought to Ireland, and round towers. From 1169 until the mid-fourteenth century, castles were mostly associated with Norman lordships and formed the basis of new settlements. Not until after 1205, during the reign of King John, was a royal castle built in Ireland. However, as Prince, John's first expedition to Ireland in 1185, saw his direct involvement in building the "royal" Ardfinnan Castle and Lismore Castle.

De Courcy, who had conquered Ulaid, instigated a large-scale program of ecclesiastic patronage from 1179. This included the building of new abbeys and priories. He formally reburied in Downpatrick the recently "found" bodies of three prominent Irish saints—Patrick, Brigit and Columba—and commissioned a "Life of Patrick".

Whilst before the arrival of the Normans some Irish kings had recorded land transactions with monasteries, after their arrival, charters for land transactions became commonplace.

Whilst elements of English common law had been used by some Anglo-Normans in Ireland, a charter drawn up by John in 1210 introduced the principle of it being applied to Ireland.

== Inter-Norman feuding and Irish alliances ==
Rivalries grew amongst the Normans in their desire for land. This led them to manipulate the "factious Gaelic political system", backing competing Gaelic lords to undermine their own Norman rivals. Despite a king in this time being seen as symbol of justice and arbiter, Henry II seems to have fostered inter-Norman rivalry, possibly as a means to rein in the power of his subordinates in Ireland so they posed him no threat. This was exemplified in 1172 by Henry II's granting of the Irish kingdom of Meath to Hugh de Lacy, to counterbalance Strongbow's domain in Leinster.

During Lord John's 1193–1194 revolt against his brother Richard I, the Normans in Ireland were divided in their allegiance. De Courcy, Walter de Lacy, Lord of Meath, along with Cathal Crobderg O'Connor, King of Connacht (who remained loyal to the English king), joined forces against William de Burgh. Although de Courcy and Hugh II de Lacy of Meath united to invade Connacht on behalf of O'Connor in 1200, de Courcy and de Lacy became enemies.

After several battles, de Lacy was granted de Courcy's earldom of Ulster. De Courcy rebelled and took refuge in the Irish kingdom of Tyrone. In 1196, de Courcy and Niall MacMahon of Oriel attacked English Oriel. A year later, Irishmen assisted de Courcy in wasting the north-west after his brother had been killed by an Irishman in his company.

== Terminology ==
In contemporary or near-contemporary sources, the invaders are overwhelmingly described as English. The Expugnatio Hibernica almost always describes them as English; so too does The Song of Dermot and the Earl, a source which uses the term "English" about eighty times, whilst using "French", "Flemings", and "Normans" in only one particular line. Despite the modern employment of terms such as "Normans", "Anglo-Normans" (itself an eighteenth-century construct), and "Cambro-Normans", contemporary sources virtually never use "Norman" in an Irish context. Irish sources usually describe the men as "foreigners" and "grey foreigners", or else as Saxain ("Saxons" or "English").

In consequence, it is apparent that contemporaries regarded the incomers as English, regardless of their actual mother tongue, ethnicity or geographic origin. In the nineteenth century, however, during a period of intense and sensitive political debate, the term was dropped by historians and replaced with ahistorical terms. In modern historiography on Irish history, historians differ in describing the Anglo-Norman invasion as being carried out by "Normans" or the "English".

It is assumed that the invaders were called English because they came from lands controlled by England and were vassals of the king of England, and not because they were culturally Anglo-Saxon. While the leaders and knights were Anglo-Normans, most of the footsoldiers and settlers were probably in fact Anglo-Saxons, and the language they spoke was Middle English, which is evident by the surviving dialects of Fingallian in Dublin and the Yola dialect of Wexford.

== See also ==
- Irish War of Independence
- Norman conquest (disambiguation)
- Plantation of Ulster
- Tudor conquest of Ireland

== Bibliography ==
- Bartlett, Thomas (2010). Ireland: A History. Cambridge: Cambridge University Press. ISBN 978-0-521-19720-5.
- Crooks, Peter (2005). "Anglo-Irish Relations". In Duffy, Seán (ed.). Medieval Ireland: An Encyclopedia. Routledge. p. 27.
- Duffy, Seán (2003). "John and Ireland". In Church, S. D. (ed.). King John: New Interpretations. Boydell & Brewer. pp. 225–227.
- Duffy, Seán (2005). Encyclopedia of Medieval Ireland. New York: Routledge. ISBN 9781135948245 – via Internet Archive.
- Duffy, Seán (2007). "Henry II and England's Insular Neighbours". In Harper-Bill, Christopher (ed.). Henry II: New Interpretations. Boydell Press. pp. 132–133. ISBN 978-1-84615-553-6.
- Duffy, Sean (2014). Brian Boru and the Battle of Clontarf. Gill Books. ISBN 978-0-7171-6207-9.
- Downham, Clare (2017). Medieval Ireland. Cambridge University Press. ISBN 978-1107651654.
- Martin, Francis Xavier (2008a) [first published 1987]. "Chapter 2: Diarmait Mac Murchada and the Coming of the Anglo-Normans". In Art Cosgrove (ed.). A New History of Ireland, Volume II: Medieval Ireland 1169–1534. Oxford University Press. pp. 43–66.
- Martin, Francis Xavier (2008b) [1987]. "Chapter 3: Allies and an Overlord, 1169–1172". In Art Cosgrove (ed.). A New History of Ireland, Volume II: Medieval Ireland 1169–1534. Oxford University Press. pp. 67–87.
- Martin, Francis Xavier (2008c) [1987]. "Chapter 4: Overlord Becomes Feudal Lord, 1172–1185". In Art Cosgrove (ed.). A New History of Ireland, Volume II: Medieval Ireland 1169–1534. Oxford University Press. pp. 98–126.
- Flanagan, Marie Therese (1989). Irish Society, Anglo-Norman Settlers, Angevin Kingship. Oxford: Oxford University Press. ISBN 978-0-198-22154-8. (For "Anglo-Norman", read "English".)
- Flanagan, Marie Therese (2005). "Anglo-Norman Invasion". In Duffy, S. (ed.). Medieval Ireland: An Encyclopedia. New York: Routledge. pp. 17–19. ISBN 0-415-94052-4.
- Gillingham, J (2000). The English in the Twelfth Century: Imperialism, National Identity, and Political Values. The Boydell Press. ISBN 0-85115-732-7.
