= Arnulf de Montgomery =

Anglo-Norman magnate

- Earl of Pembroke
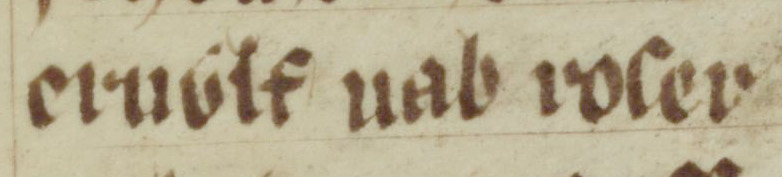
- Arnulf's name as it appears on folio 67v of Oxford Jesus College 111 (the Red Book of Hergest): "ernỽlf uab roser".
- Born: c. 1066
- Died: 1118/1122
- Noble family: Montgomery
- Wife: Lafracoth
- Issue: Robert MacCimbric; Alice de Montgomery
- Father: Roger de Montgomery
- Mother: Mabel de Bellême

Arnulf de Montgomery (born c. 1066; died 1118/1122) was an Anglo-Norman magnate. (Note: Since the 1980s, academics have accorded Arnulf various names in English secondary sources: Arnulf de Bellême, Arnulf de Montgomery, Arnulf of Montgomery, Arnulf of Pembroke, and Arnulf Montgomery.) He was a younger son of Roger de Montgomery and Mabel de Bellême. Arnulf's father was a leading magnate in Normandy and England, and played an active part in the Anglo-Norman invasion of Wales in the late eleventh century.

Following the Montgomerys' successes against the Welsh, Arnulf established himself at Pembroke, where an earth and timber castle was erected, and was probably rewarded with the title Earl of Pembroke.

At the turn of the twelfth century Arnulf reached height, with his lordship including much of the former Welsh Kingdom of Deheubarth as well as various lands in Yorkshire. Not long after reaching this apex of his career, Arnulf assisted his eldest surviving brother, Robert de Bellême, in a rebellion against Henry I, King of England. It was also about this time that Arnulf married a daughter of Muirchertach Ua Briain, King of Munster, in what appears to have been an effort to gain military support against the English Crown.

Following the ultimate collapse of the rebellion, however, the Montgomerys were outlawed and banished from the realm, and Arnulf appears to have spent much of the next twenty-odd years in a peripatetic life in Ireland and Normandy. Arnulf's career exemplifies the opportunities available to younger sons of the Anglo-Norman aristocracy. Arnulf appears to have died between 1118 and 1122. A tombstone in Tulsk, Ireland bears the name of Arnoul (Arnulf) and the date 1122.

Arnulf and his wife Lafracoth (daughter of Muirchertach Ua Briain, King of Munster) are known to have left one daughter, Alice, who was born circa 1115; however, according to Europäische Stammtafeln, Arnulf and Lafracoth had two children, Robert and Alice, who would have progeny.

== Background ==
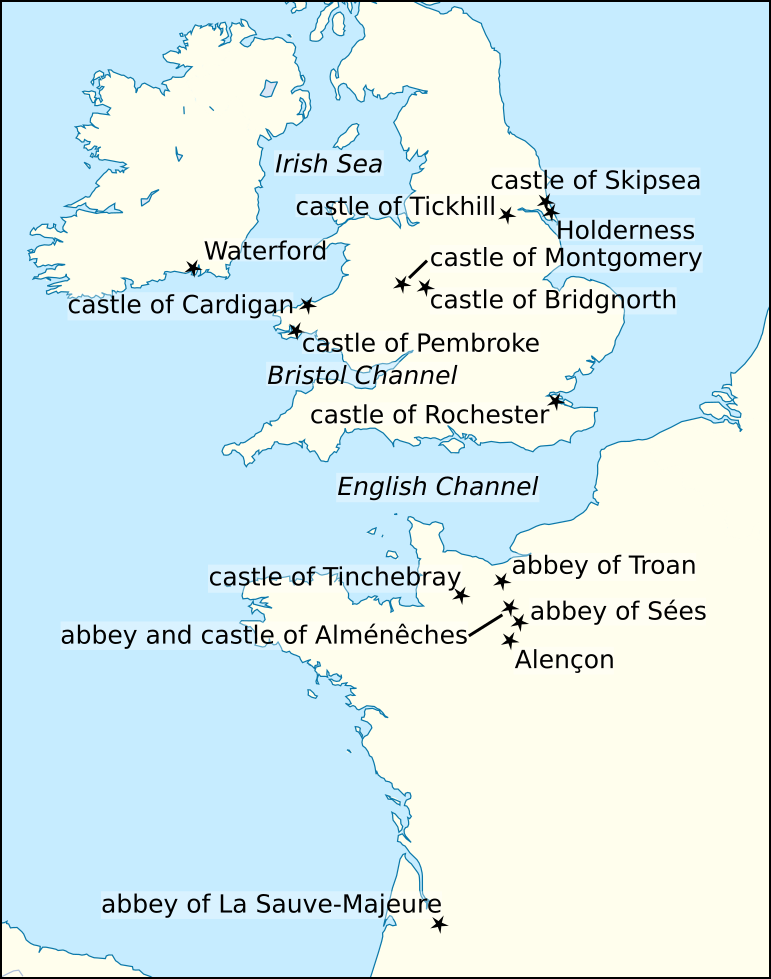
Locations relating to Arnulf's life and times.

Arnulf was likely born in the late 1060s, possibly about 1066. He was a younger son of Roger de Montgomery, Vicomte of the Hièmois and Mabel de Bellême. Arnulf's parents likely married in about 1050. His mother was a daughter of, and eventual heiress of, William de Bellême, Lord of Alençon. Arnulf's father, a kinsman and close companion of William II, Duke of Normandy, was an eminent magnate in Normandy. As tutor to Matilda, Duchess of Normandy, Roger and his eldest sons did not embark on the 1066 Norman invasion of England. When William returned to Normandy as king in 1067, Roger accompanied him back to England, and was granted extensive lands, including the Sussex rapes of Arundel and Chichester, followed by the county of Shropshire. Soon afterwards, Roger was made Earl of Shrewsbury. By 1086, he was one of the wealthiest tenants-in-chief in England. Arnulf makes his first appearance in the historical record at about this time when he and his elder brother, Roger de Poitou, witnessed William's confirmation of their father's grant to the Norman abbey of Troarn in 1082/1083. (Note: This charter marks the first appearance of Roger de Poitou.)

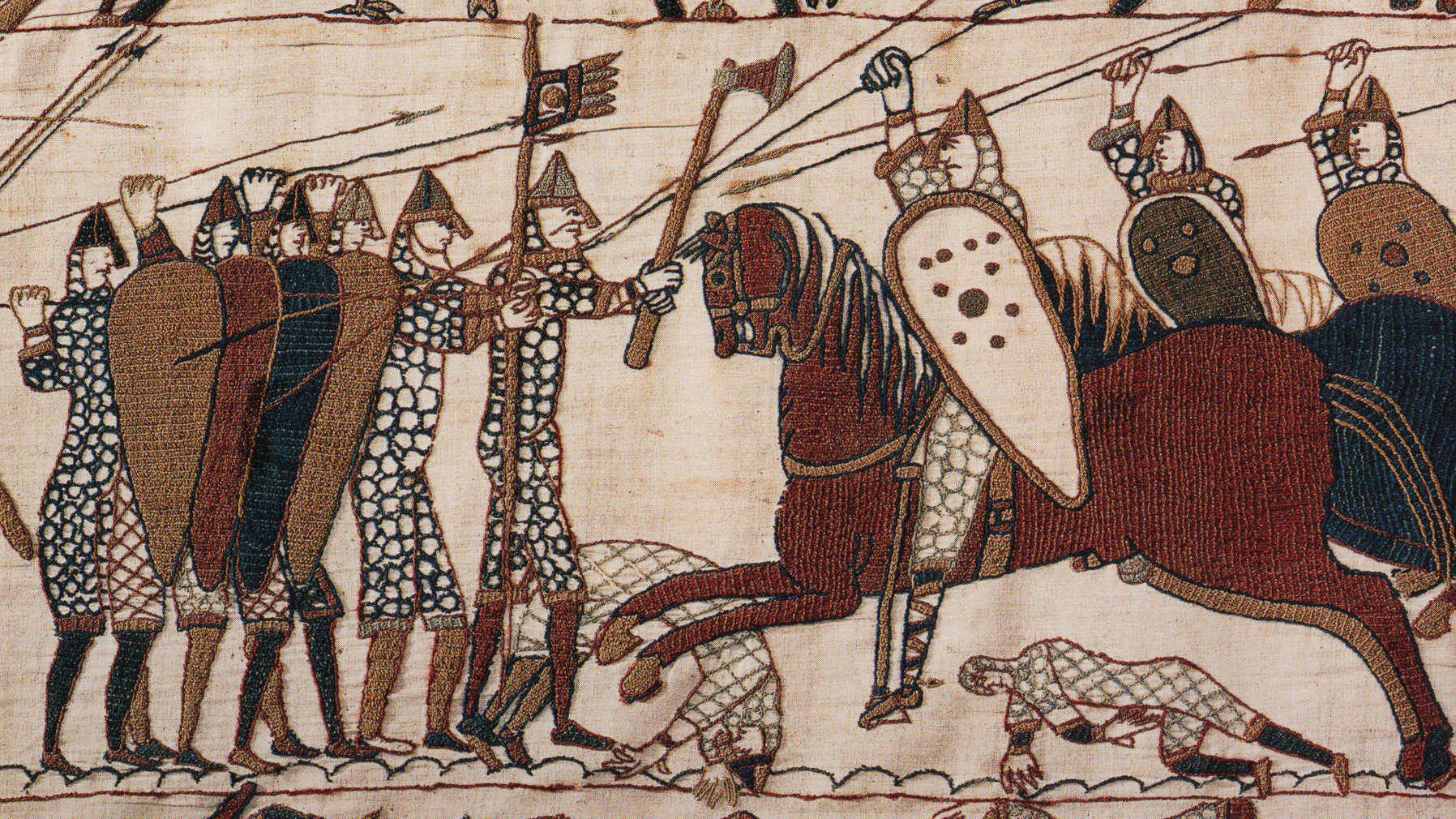
The Bayeux Tapestry's depiction of the Battle of Hastings. Although Arnulf's family did not participate in the invasion of England in 1066, it was richly rewarded with English lands soon afterwards.

In 1088, Roger and at least three of his sons participated in plot to eject William Rufus, King of England from the throne with the intent to replace him with Robert Curthose, Duke of Normandy, William Rufus' elder brother. This rebellion is documented by several sources, such as the ninth- to twelfth-century Anglo-Saxon Chronicle, and the twelfth-century texts Chronicon ex chronicis, Gesta regum Anglorum, and Historia Anglorum. According to the "E" version of the Anglo-Saxon Chronicle—the only strictly contemporary source of the four—Robert Curthose's followers captured Odo, Bishop of Bayeux and thereby gained control of the castle of Rochester. This source identifies several leading members of the insurrection, including three unnamed sons of Roger. Whilst it is possible that these brothers were Roger's eldest sons Robert de Bellême, Hugh de Montgomery, and Roger de Poitou, it is not impossible that the latter took no part in the rising, and that the third brother was in fact Arnulf himself. Although the rebellion was an ultimate failure, the king imposed no penalty upon Roger, and allowed Roger de Poitou to be reinstated with most of the lands that the eleventh-century Domesday Book shows he previously held.

== Rise ==
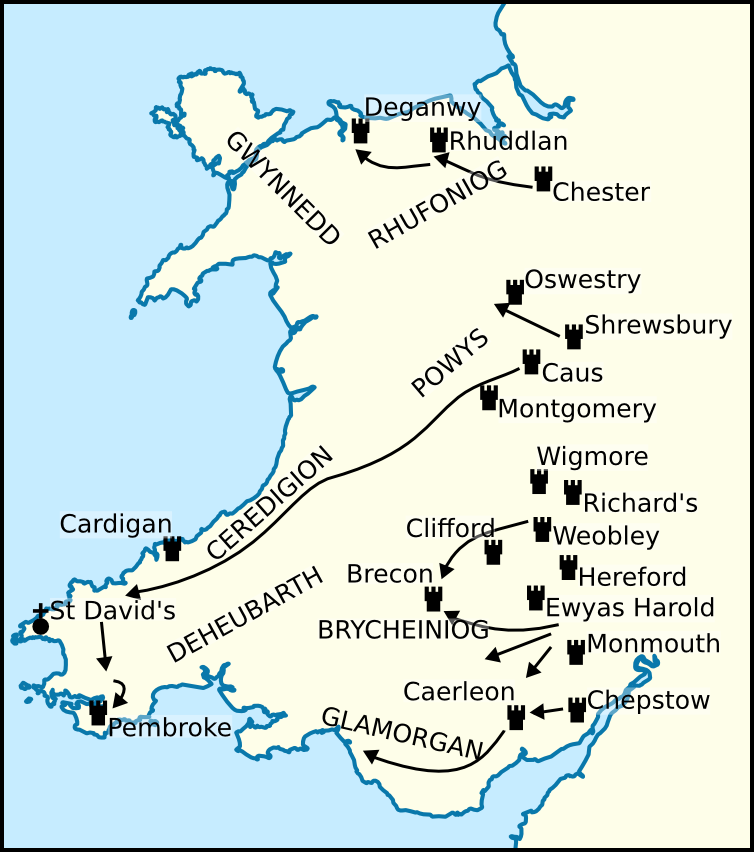
Anglo-Norman advance into Wales, and the penetration of Montgomery power into Deheubarth, where Arnulf established himself at Pembroke in about 1093. (Note: At some point before 1086, Roger de Montgomery constructed the castle at Montgomery, named after his ancestral lands in Normandy. Possibly in 1073 or 1093, he constructed the castle at Cardigan, possibly on the site where the current castle now stands.)

Arnulf's father was one of three close supporters of the king who were settled along the Anglo-Welsh border, in a region known as the Welsh Marches. Although the first real penetration of Anglo-Norman power occurred in the 1070s, it wasn't until the last decade of the eleventh century that more permanent marcher settlements were envisaged in Wales. In 1093, encroaching marcher lords engaged and slew Rhys ap Tewdwr, King of Deheubarth in Brycheiniog. Contemporaries marked Rhys' fall as the end of kingship amongst the Welsh, and his demise left a power-vacuum in which men such as Arnulf seized upon. The south-west Welsh gwladoedd ("countries") of Ceredigion and Dyfed were thus overwhelmed and settled by the conquering incomers. In the latter gwlad ("country"), Arnulf's father founded an earth and timber castle in which Arnulf established himself. This ringwork, strategically seated on the highest point of a promontory between two tidal inlets, sat on the site where the castle of Pembroke stands today. Although nothing now remains of the original castle, it is described by the twelfth-century Itinerarium Kambriæ as a "slender fortress built of stakes and turf".

William Rufus subsequently rewarded Arnulf with a lordship seated at his castle. There is substantial evidence indicating that Arnulf was, in fact, made Earl of Pembroke. For example, he was accorded forms of the Latin style comes by Anselm, Archbishop of Canterbury, Itinerarium Kambriæ, the twelfth-century Vita Anselmi, the twelfth-century Historia ecclesiastica, the thirteenth- and fourteenth-century Brut y Tywysogyon, the twelfth-century Warenne Chronicle, and the cartulary of the abbey of Saint-Martin de Sées. The castle at Pembroke is remarkable in the fact that, unlike other Anglo-Norman or English fortresses in west Wales, it never fell into the hands of the Welsh. At some time between 1097 and 1108, Arnulf's castellan at Pembroke, Gerald de Windsor, married Rhys' daughter, Nest. According to Brut y Tywysogyon, Arnulf captured and imprisoned Rhys' young son, Hywel, before the latter was able to escape after suffering certain bodily injuries. Having established himself at Pembroke, Arnulf appears to have resided in England, leaving Gerald at Pembroke as his de facto custos or steward. (Note: The southern march suffered from a Welsh resurgence in the years immediately following the successes of 1093. A fanciful tale of Arnulf's castle was recounted by Itinerarium Kambriæ, authored by Giraldus Cambrensis, a maternal grandson of Gerald. In this account, the castle was besieged by the Welsh whilst the fortress was under Gerald's command. Running short on supplies, and losing men to poor moral, Itinerarium Kambriæ states that Gerald not only had the carcasses of four pigs thrown over the stockade to convince the attackers that the defenders were well-stocked with supplies, but even had a fake letter to Arnulf planted outside the castle in which he declared that the castle did not need any reinforcements or supplies in the foreseeable future. Through these machinations, Itinerarium Kambriæ states that the Welsh abandoned the siege, and that Gerald saved the castle of Pembroke.)

The people and the priest are despised by the word, heart and work of the Normans. For they increase our taxes and burn our properties. One vile Norman intimidates a hundred natives with his command, and terrifies them with his look... Families do not now delight in offspring; the heir does not hope for the paternal estates; the rich man does not aspire to accumulate flocks.

— a contemporary account lamenting the aftereffects of the Anglo-Norman invasion of Wales, from Planctus Ricemarch, by Rhygyfarch ap Sulien

On his father's death in 1094, Arnulf's elder brother, Hugh de Montgomery, inherited the earldom of Shrewsbury. Surviving sources reveal that the brothers were closely associated with each other. Within two years they made a joint grant to the far-off abbey of La Sauve-Majeure. (Note: A later grant to this religious house evidences Arnulf's patronage in the last years of William Rufus' reign.) Furthermore, Arnulf appears to have witnessed a grant of Hugh de Montgomery's dapifer to the abbey, in a charter dated to 1095–1098. In a Latin grant to the abbey of Saint-Martin de Sées, founded by his father, Arnulf bestowed a donation on behalf of his ancestors, lord, friends, and "very dear brother Hugh" ("carissimi fratris sui Hugonis"). (Note: This grant was later confirmed by Robert Curthose.) Although the particular wording in this grant may reveal genuine affection for his brother, these acta as a whole could reveal that Arnulf was regarded as the heir of the unmarried and childless Hugh de Montgomery, and that William Rufus intended to acknowledge this inheritance as well.

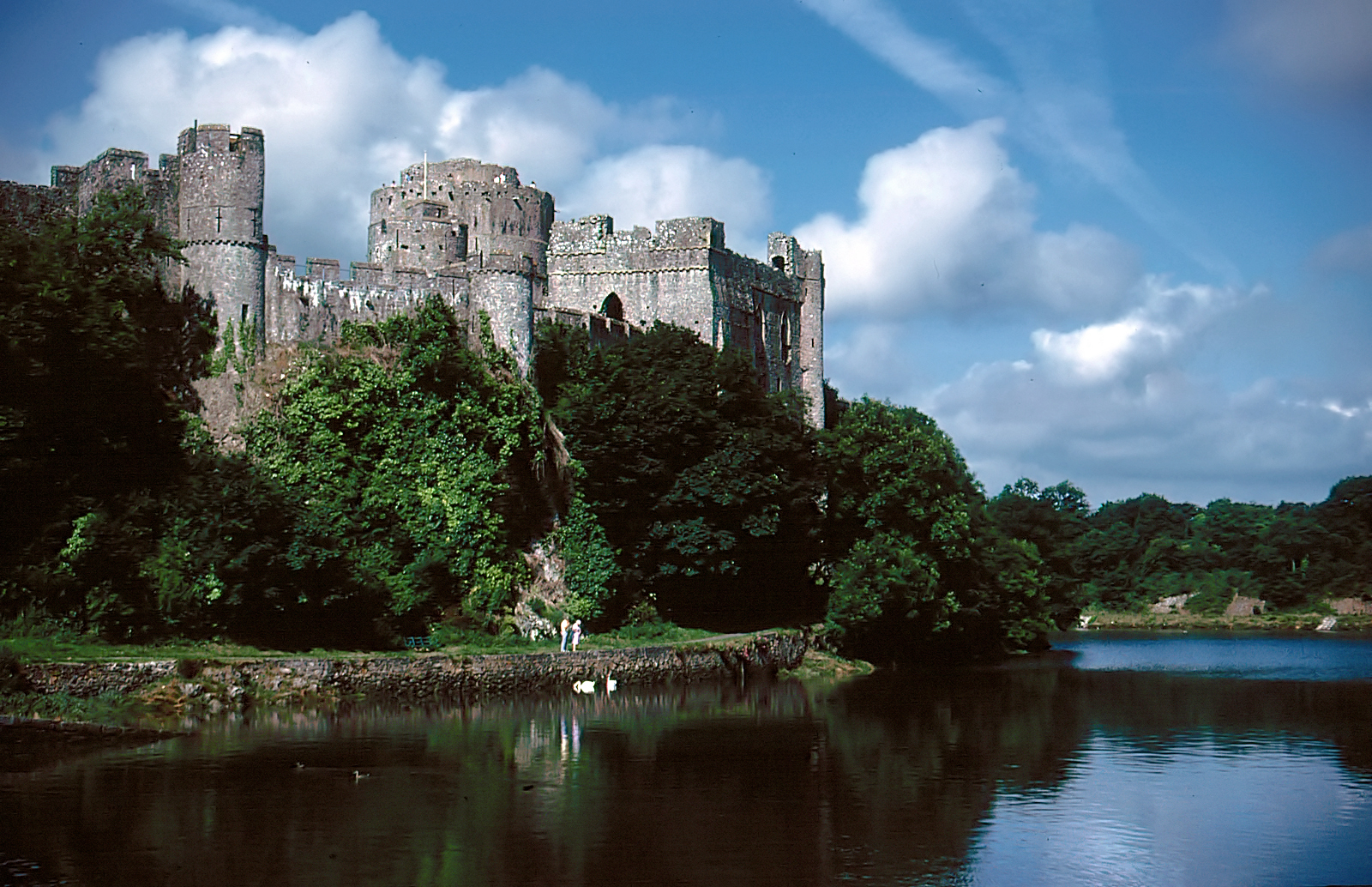
The massive stone walls and towers of the castle of Pembroke bear little resemblance to Arnulf's earth and timber castle constructed in about 1093. Arnulf's fortress was replaced with this stone castle by William Marshal, Earl of Pembroke, and further construction was continued by the latter's heirs and successors.

Partly as a result of the political conquest of Wales in the late eleventh century, the Anglo-Norman Church endeavoured to subjugate and exploit the Welsh Church. From the perspective of the English Crown, the Welsh Church was isolated, archaic, deviant, and backward-looking. Conversely, Anglo-Normans regarded themselves as religious reformers, and sought to impose their own standards and practices upon the Welsh. One way in which the Anglo-Normans imposed their ecclesiastical authority upon the Welsh was through the appointment and control of bishops. Within a year of his consecration as Archbishop of Canterbury in December 1093, Anselm temporarily suspended the Welsh bishops of Glamorgan and St Davids, revealing that these diocesan territories had fallen under Canterbury's ecclesiastical authority. (Note: This was the first act of Canterbury's jurisdiction over Wales. In effect, Canterbury's authority over Wales lasted from then until 1920.) In May 1095, Wilfrid, Bishop of St Davids came to terms with Anselm. In turn, the latter admonished several leading Anglo-Normans holding lands in the Diocese of St Davids, urging them to regard Wilfrid as their bishop, and to return the lands, tithes, and churches that they had unjustly seized from him. Two marcher lords specifically singled out by Anselm were Arnulf and Robert de Bellême. (Note: Others specifically named by Anselm include Ralph de Mortimer, Philip de Briouze, and Bernard de Neufmarché.) In fact, the ravaging of the lands of St Davids in 1097 by Arnulf's steward at Pembroke, Gerald, is recorded by the thirteenth- and fourteenth-century Brenhinedd y Saesson, Brut y Tywysogyon, the "B" and "C" versions of the eleventh- to thirteenth-century Annales Cambriæ. As a friend of the archbishop, Arnulf may have been more liable to respect this call of restraint from Anselm than from anyone else.

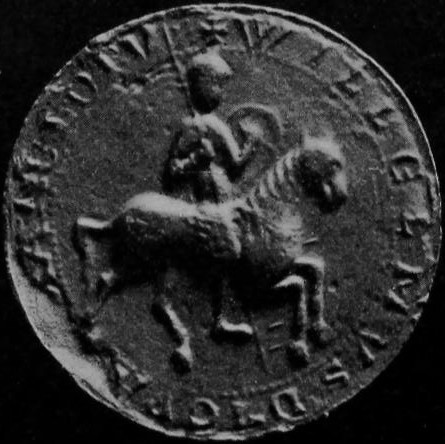
Seal of William Rufus. The device depicts the armament of a late eleventh-century mounted knight.

In 1098, together with Hugh d'Avranches, Earl of Chester, Hugh de Montgomery led a summer invasion of Gwynedd. Although the Anglo-Normans easily defeated the Welsh defenders, the attackers were later overwhelmed on Anglesey in an encounter with the forces of Magnús Óláfsson, King of Norway. Arnulf appears to have learned of his brother's fate about a month later in Normandy, since he travelled to Sées, and founded a priory of the abbey's monks at Pembroke in dedication to the memory of Hugh de Montgomery and his father. Although Arnulf may well have hoped to inherit his brother's title and lands, William Rufus granted them to Arnulf's older brother Robert de Bellême, who had captured Helias de la Flèche, Count of Maine only months before, dutifully handing the count over to the king. (Note: Robert de Bellême and William Rufus campaigned against Helias on the Continent in the context of the king seeking to renew control over the county of Maine. According to Historia ecclesiastica, Robert de Bellême had to pay the king a relief of £3000 before he was rewarded with the earldom.)

== Downfall ==
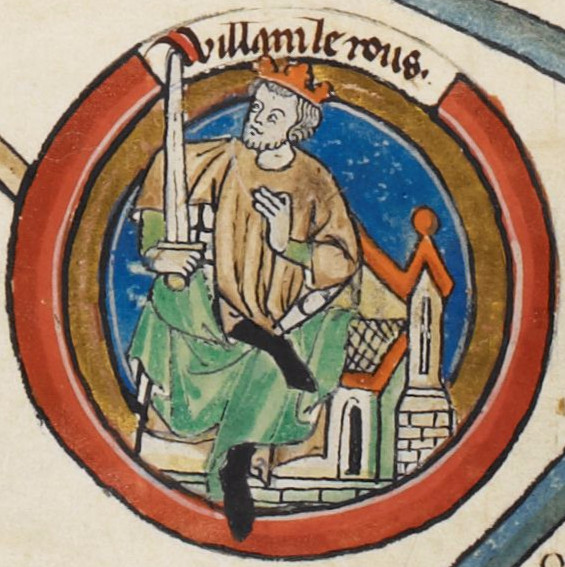
William Rufus as depicted on folio 5r of British Library Royal 14 B VI.

At the turn of the twelfth century, the Montgomerys were one of the leading families in England. At this point, Robert de Bellême had reached the height of his power, and appears to have been the most powerful and prosperous magnate in the Anglo-Norman world. Besides inheriting the expansive continental lands of the Montgomery and Bellême families, and succeeding to the earldom of Shrewsbury and the rape of Arundel, Robert de Bellême also obtained the honour of Tickhill in Nottinghamshire and southern Yorkshire. Furthermore, by right of his wife's inheritance, Robert de Bellême gained the small but important continental county of Ponthieu. His brother, Roger the Poitevin, was one of the most powerful magnates in northwest England, holding lands in Lancashire, Nottinghamshire, Essex, Yorkshire, and Suffolk. By right of his wife, he gained the continental county of La Marche. (Note: Roger de Poitou disappears from William Rufus' acta in 1094, which may be evidence that he relocated to La Marche, where his wife was deeply involved in a succession dispute.) As for their brother, Arnulf, he likely held the Earldom of Pembroke, a lordship which appears to have constituted the core of the former Kingdom of Deheubarth. Arnulf gained the lordship of Holderness, following the downfall of its former lord, the disgraced Odo, Count of Champagne. (Note: Odo had been implicated in a plot against William Rufus in 1095. After Arnulf's own forfeiture in 1102, his lands of Holderness were returned to Odo's son, Stephen, Count of Aumâle. This particular back-and-forth changing of hands of the honour illustrates the risks suffered by undertenants whose liege was only a temporary interloper. Specifically, whilst Arnulf held the honour, he granted gifts from the Holderness lands of Carlton, Easington, Frodingham, Paghill, Preston, Skeekling, Tunstall, Withernsea, and gifts from a castle (perhaps one at Aldbrough or that of Skipsea), to the abbey of Saint-Martin de Sées and a cell of the abbey's monks that he had founded at Pembroke. He further granted gifts from Barrow and Bytham, both Holderness lands in Lincolnshire, to the abbey of La Sauve-Majeure. After his downfall and Stephen's reinstatement, the aforementioned grants of Arnulf lapsed, and Stephen made grants of his own. The historicity of a castle at Aldbrough is uncertain. Contemporary evidence for its existence depends on a single source, a charter of Stephen dated to 1115, which may be a mere misreading.)

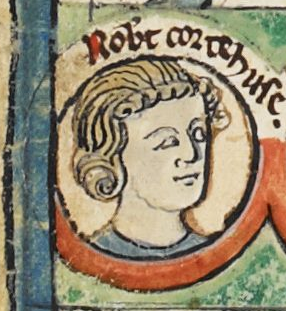
Robert Curthose as depicted on folio 5r of British Library Royal 14 B VI.

In August 1100, whilst Robert Curthose was absent en route from the Holy Land, the reigning William Rufus was killed, and the vacant English throne was seized by their younger brother, Henry, Count of the Cotentin. Fearing an invasion from Normandy by Robert Curthose, an early act of Henry's reign was an alliance with Robert II, Count of Flanders, formalised by treaty in March 1101. One of the guarantors recorded lending surety for the English king was Arnulf himself. Guarantors to such acts often led negotiations between involved parties, which could indicate that Arnulf acted as an intermediary between the king and count. Although his involvement on Henry's behalf further evidences Arnulf's considerable status, his career in the king's service was short-lived.

Although Robert de Bellême had initially accepted Henry as king, by the time Robert Curthose asserted his claim to the throne at Alton in 1101, Robert de Bellême was supporting the duke's cause. According to Historia ecclesiastica, the king spent a year collecting evidence against Robert de Bellême; and in 1102, Henry summoned the latter, charging him with forty-five different offences against himself and Robert Curthose. According to Brut y Tywysogyon, Arnulf was likewise summoned and charged. Arnulf appears to have fled to Wales, and Historia ecclesiastica records that Robert de Bellême fortified his English castles against Henry's men. Whilst Robert de Bellême made alliances with the Welsh, Arnulf reached out to the Irish. Specifically, Brut y Tywysogyon reveals that Arnulf sent Gerald of Windsor to Ireland in order to arrange military assistance from Muirchertach Ua Briain, King of Munster. The alliance was formalised by a remarkable marriage between Arnulf and one of Muirchertach's daughters, the record of which is preserved by Historia ecclesiastica, Brenhinedd y Saesson, Brut y Tywysogyon, and alluded to by the eleventh- to fourteenth-century Annals of Inisfallen. These sources are further corroborated by a particular letter from Muirchertach to Anselm,—perhaps dating to about 1105 or 1106/1107,—in which Muirchertach expressed his gratitude to the archbishop for intervening with Henry on behalf of "my son-in-law Arnulf". Although the native Gaelic form of the bride's name is unknown for certain, Historia ecclesiastica names her "Lafracoth" in Latin. One possibility is that her name represents Aifric. Another is that it represents Lebarcam.

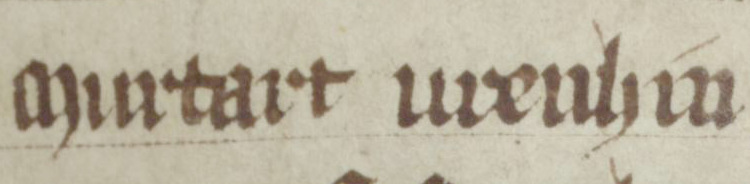
The name and title of Muirchertach Ua Briain as it appears on folio 63r of Oxford Jesus College 111: "Murtart urenhin".

What specifically motivated Muirchertach to agree to an alliance is unknown. It certainly brought him into close contact with one of Europe's leading families. One possibility is that he was attempting to enhance his status on an international stage. He may have also sought to secure the valuable trade route from south Wales and the Bristol Channel to Waterford. (Note: The capture of Waterford in 1170 by Arnulf's eventual comital successor, Richard de Clare, Earl of Pembroke, may have been undertaken for similar reasons.) His involvement may well have formed part of a larger plan to not only increase power in Ireland but further exert influence throughout the Irish Sea region. (Note: Probably at about the same time as the marriage between Arnulf and Lafracoth, Muirchertach married another one of his daughters, a certain Bjaðmunjo, to Magnús' young son, Sigurðr.) As for Arnulf, the marital alliance could have been undertaken in an attempt to enhance his own status in society. (Note: Arnulf's marriage seems to foreshadow that of Richard de Clare and Aífe, daughter of Diarmait Mac Murchada. According to Historia ecclesiastica, Arnulf treacherously sought to succeed his father-in-law. Historically, Richard de Clare succeeded his own father-in-law.) On the other hand, the marriage may have been a path by which Arnulf or his brother attempted to gain access to Muirchertach's military might. Furthermore, the alliance may have been coordinated as a means to gain the neutrality of Muirchertach's powerful ally, Magnús, the king who had killed Hugh de Montgomery in 1098. Alternately, the Montgomerys may have intended to enlist military assistance from Magnús. Certainly, Historia ecclesiastica states that Henry was greatly concerned with Magnús' presence in the region, although there is no evidence that the Norwegians assisted the rebels. (Note: The early thirteenth-century saga compilation Morkinskinna may preserve evidence of an emissary sent to Scandinavia in order to represent the rebels. This apparent emissary is named Giffarðr, which could indicate that he was a member of the Giffard family, possibly Walter Giffard, Earl of Buckingham, a man who is identified by Historia ecclesiastica as one of the magnates who conspired to replace Henry with Robert Curthose in 1101. This source also states that Henry seized a cache of treasure from a merchant in Lincoln after having learned of Magnús' demise. One possibility is that this stash was payment intended to entice the Norwegian king to back the Bellême-Montgomery coalition.) Despite the fact that Brut y Tywysogyon reports that Muirchertach lent the two brothers military support, and the distinct possibility that Roger de Poitou aided them as well, the Bellême-Montgomery insurrection ended in utter failure.

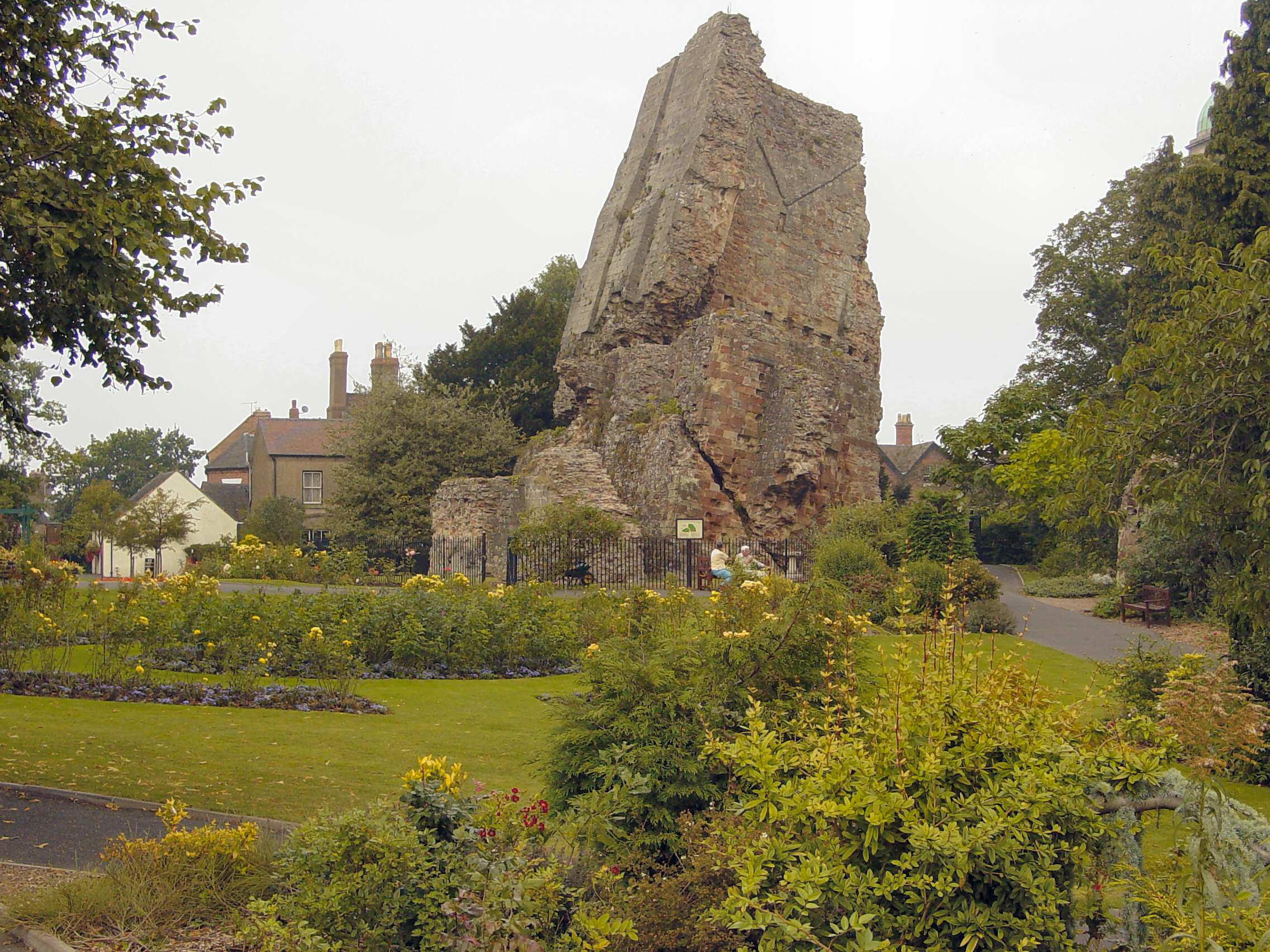
The ruinous castle of Bridgnorth. After the castle's fall to Henry's forces in 1102, the Bellême-Montgomery rebellion quickly collapsed. Initial work on the tower may have taken place under Robert de Bellême, although it appears to have been at least completed under Henry.

Surviving sources give differing accounts of the rebellion. Arnulf's principal contribution appears to have been his participation in a predatory strike into Staffordshire. According to the twelfth-century Historia regum Anglorum and Chronicon ex chronicis, Robert de Bellême and Arnulf, supported by Welsh allies, ravaged a part of the county, before carrying off livestock and men to Wales. (Note: It is possible that some of these captives ended up in the Irish slave market.) The detailed account of the general uprising preserved by Historia ecclesiastica appears to be the most reliable record of events. This source reveals that, following Robert de Bellême's flight from the king's summons, Henry appears to have raised a feudal host consisting of his tenants-in-chief (who owed him knight-service) and the old English fyrd (a levy of one armed man from about every five hides or six carucates). Both Chronicon ex chronicis and Historia ecclesiastica and state that Henry's host besieged the castle of Arundel for three months before its capitulation, after which the king led his forces to the castle of Tickhill which immediately surrendered. After temporarily standing down his army, Henry resumed operations in the autumn, he is recorded to have seized the castle of Bridgnorth after a three-week siege. At about this point, William Pantulf, a former vassal of the Montgomerys, is stated to have offered his services to Robert de Bellême. Upon being rebuffed by the latter, William Pantulf is recorded to have gone over to Henry's side, and was apparently instrumental in convincing Robert de Bellême's Welsh allies desert him and support the king instead. (Note: In the 1070s, William Pantulf—then a tenant of Roger de Montgomery in Normandy—was suspected to have participated in Mabel's murder. Although William Pantulf suffered the confiscation of his lands following her murder, he later gained lands in Shropshire, Staffordshire, and Warwickshire. Once Robert de Bellême succeeded to the earldom of Shrewsbury, he deprived William Pantulf of his lands.) Brut y Tywysogyon specifically states that Iorwerth ap Bleddyn, a leading Welshman, was bought off by the king and began to harry his former ally's lands. After Henry's forces marched to Shrewsbury itself, Historia ecclesiastica records that Robert de Bellême's submitted to the king in person. Defeated, the three surviving sons of Roger de Montgomery were banished from the kingdom, with their lands and titles declared forfeit. (Note: Henry's 1102 confirmation of the gifts that Arnulf granted to the abbey of Saint-Martin de Sées in 1098 dates before the Bellême-Montgomery rebellion. The nunnery of Arnulf's sister, Emma, also lost its English lands. Having vanquished the rebels, Henry transformed the Welsh marches, settling not only new lords in the region, but disposing lordships upon the native Welsh as well. He kept personal control of Arnulf's lordship of Pembroke; and the latter's steward, Gerald, entered the king's service. From Pembroke, Henry appears to have exercised lordship over the lords of Cemais, Draughleddau, Emlyn, Narberth, Rhos, and personal overlordship over the Castlemartin peninsula.)

== Aftermath ==
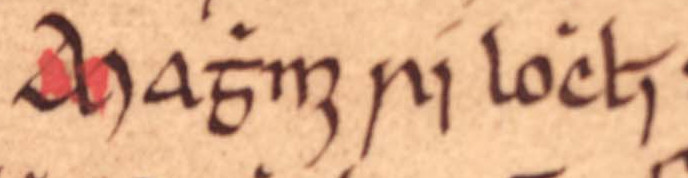
The name and title of Magnús Óláfsson as it appears on folio 46v of Oxford Bodleian Library Rawlinson B 489 (the Annals of Ulster).

Whilst Robert fled to the continent, surviving sources suggest that Arnulf—and likely others from the ill-fated insurrection—sought refuge in Ireland. Certainly, Gesta regum Anglorum makes note of a deterioration in relations between Muirchertach and Henry before an English trade embargo forced reconciliation upon the Irish. One possibility is that this episode occurred as a consequence Muirchertach's alliance with the Montgomerys, and his part in their rebellion. (Note: The embargo would have affected the towns of Dublin and Waterford, and consequently Muirchertach himself, as he was the overlord of these Norse-Gaelic enclaves. Although this breakdown may be related to the rebellion, an alternate possibility is that it actually stemmed from Muirchertach's competing interests in the Irish Sea zone. It is possible that Muirchertach's correspondence to Anselm concerning Arnulf was initiated as a means to not merely aid his son-in-law, but to roll back the English sanctions evidenced by Gesta regum Anglorum.) Furthermore, Historia ecclesiastica claims that Arnulf and other Normans assisted the Muirchertach in a military capacity, apparently against the forces of Magnús himself. However, after the latter fell in battle against Muirchertach's forces, this source states that the Irish turned upon the Normans, and that Muirchertach forced Arnulf from Ireland altogether. In fact, the details of this account are likely erroneous, as Magnús appears to have fallen against the Ulaid, not Muirchertach's men. (Note: Historia ecclesiastica also claims that Arnulf only married Lafracoth in an attempt to acquire her father's kingdom and thereby "gain more than is right".) The claim of Arnulf's flight from Ireland, and Muirchertach's enmity against him, may be mistaken as well, especially in light of the emphatic letter between Muirchertach and Anselm concerning Arnulf. Such mediation between the Irish and English monarchs would seem to have been conducted whilst Arnulf was a resident at Muirchertach's royal court. In any event, the account preserved by Historia ecclesiastica may be evidence of English mercenarial involvement in Ireland during Henry's reign. (Note: The Irish annals make no mention of Arnulf or any of his men in Ireland. Decades later, however, when the exiled Diarmait Mac Murchada returned to Ireland, enstrengthened with Flemings from Pembrokeshire, the Annals of Inisfallen and the fifteenth- to sixteenth-century Annals of Ulster fail to mention these particular foreigners, which could suggest that mercenarial involvement in Ireland was not uncommon.) It is conceivable that Arnulf did indeed campaign in Ireland on behalf of Muirchertach, and that the latter's marital alliances with Magnús and Arnulf in 1102 were undertaken in the context of offsetting Muirchertach's main rival, Domnall Mac Lochlainn, King of Cenél nEógain. It may have been that Muirchertach regarded Arnulf as insurance against the prospect of future treachery from Magnús. Whatever the case, unfortunately for Muirchertach, not only was Magnús slain in a skirmish in the following year, but Muirchertach's forces suffered a disastrous defeat at the hands of Domnall's forces at Mag Coba. (Note: One possibility is that Magnús' last foray had been coordinated with Muirchertach's campaign against Domnall.) If there is any truth to the claim of Arnulf being driven from Ireland, it is possible that Historia ecclesiastica may evince an attempt by Muirchertach to mend fractured relations with Henry.

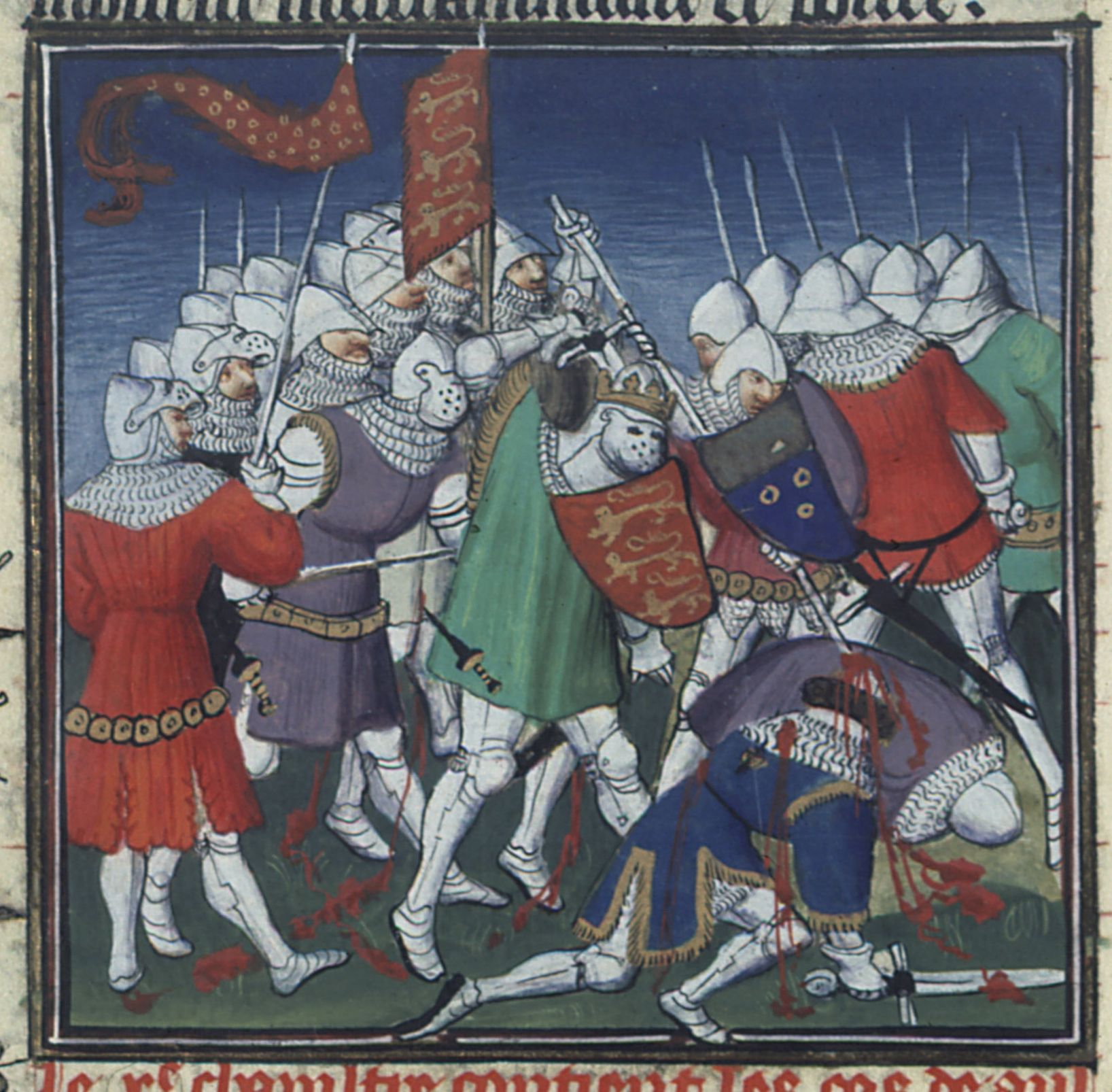
A fifteenth-century depiction of the Battle of Tinchebray in 1106 as depicted on folio 256v of Bibliothèque nationale de France Français 226. A Welsh source suggests that Arnulf partook in this clash between the forces of Henry and Robert Curthose.

Robert Curthose initially agreed to support Henry against the banished Robert de Bellême, who was now in Normandy and hostile to the duke. At some point before June 1103, Arnulf appears to have betrayed his brother's trust, since Historia ecclesiastica states that Arnulf took the castle of Alménêches, a Montgomery family stronghold, and handed it over to the duke. It may have been at this point that Arnulf sought refuge in Ireland. Whatever the case, Robert de Bellême's efforts to recover the castle led to his razing of the nearby nunnery of Alménêches, where his sister, Emma, was abbess. By 1104, his military successes against the duke forced the latter to come to terms. With Robert de Bellême and Robert Curthose thus reconciled, Henry turned against the two and finally defeated them in battle, near the castle of Tinchebray in September 1106. Although a version of Brut y Tywysogyon suggests that Arnulf took part in the battle, the account of Arnulf's earlier betrayal at Alménêches preserved by Historia ecclesiastica may contradict this. Despite the correspondence evidencing Anselm's reconciliation of Henry with Arnulf, the latter never held land in England ever again, and appears to have endured a peripatetic career for about twenty years. Evidence that he visited England, at least on one occasion, may be preserved by Vita Anselmi which states that Arnulf made a returning voyage from Normandy ("de Normannia Angliam rediens"). (Note: The particular passage in this source relates that, during this voyage across the English Channel, Arnulf's boat was caught in a storm for two days. Vita Anselmi states that, when Arnulf implored his fellow passengers to pray to Anselm for protection, the storm miraculously cleared; and that, once the boat had made landfall, the disembarked passengers reported the miracle at Henry's court. Anselm was a candidate for canonisation later in the twelfth century. The account preserved by Vita Anselmi is evidence that Arnulf was one of Anselm's earliest devotees, and this episode concerning Arnulf seems to have taken place shortly after Anselm's death.)

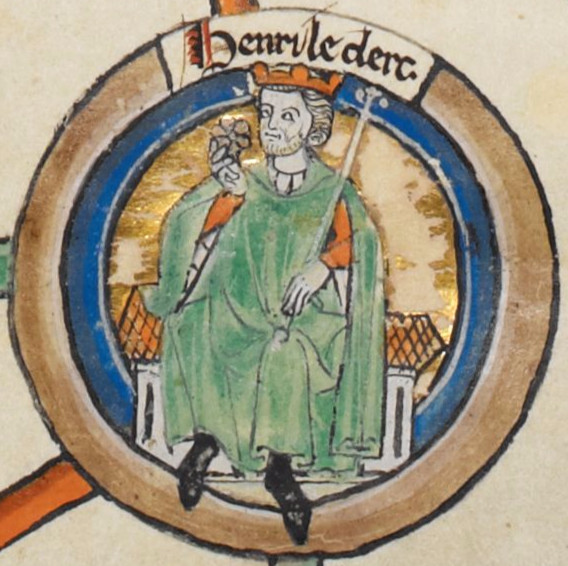
Henry as depicted on folio 5r of British Library Royal 14 B VI.

Between 1110 and 1112, Robert de Bellême involved himself in uprisings in southern Normandy, encouraged by Henry's opponent, the recently inaugurated Foulques, Count of Anjou and Maine. Henry responded by bringing charges against Robert de Bellême, and finally seizing him in November 1112. The latter's lands were declared forfeit, and he was imprisoned by the king for the rest of his life. During the first quarter of the twelfth century, Arnulf attested eight charters of Foulques, making Arnulf one of the count's most frequent witnesses. In about 1114, Arnulf witnessed an act between his great-niece, Philippa, Countess of Poitou, and Bernard-Aton, Vicomte of Béziers. Arnulf's influence at Foulques's court appears to be evidenced by particular actions in 1118. That year the townsfolk of Alençon rebelled against Henry and their lord Stephen, Count of Mortain, whilst the latter were campaigning against a continental coalition attempting to replace the king with Robert Curthose's illegitimate son, William Clito. (Note: Stephen was Henry's nephew and a future King of England.) The region of Alençon was a former power centre of the Bellême family, and according to Historia ecclesiastica, the townsfolk requested that Arnulf intervene with Foulques on their behalf against Stephen's injustices and oppression. In what turned out to be Henry's single greatest defeat, Foulques' troops then seized the town and besieged the citadel, before crushing Henry's relief forces, after which Foulques secured the citadel once and for all. Arnulf, probably now in his fifties, is not noted in any of the surviving sources documenting the clash. Nevertheless, he and his family could well have been responsible for an uprising that appears to flared up at about the same time in former Montgomery-Bellême lands in central Normandy. This insurrection seems to have contributed to Henry's restoration of much of the former Montgomery-Bellême lands in Normandy to Robert de Bellême's son, William III, Count of Ponthieu, in June 1119.

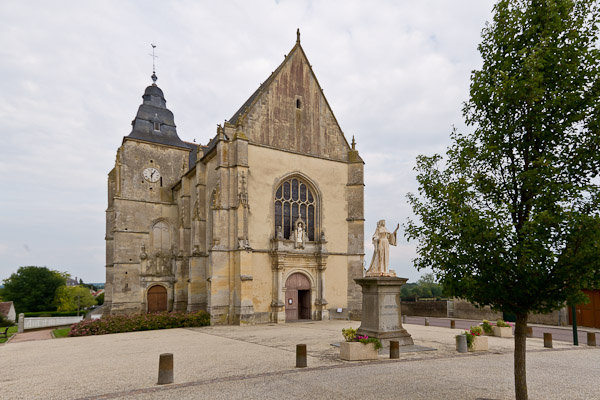
The abbey of Alménêches was founded by Arnulf's father, Roger de Montgomery.

The next certain record concerning Arnulf occurs in 1122, when his name is listed in a mortuary roll, circulated after the death of churchman Vitalis of Savigny, in which the nuns of the abbey of Alménêches commemorated him, his parents, and his younger brother Philip. (Note: Philip died on crusade in Antioch.) Arnulf, therefore, died sometime between 1118 and 1122. The depiction of Arnulf's death preserved by Historia ecclesiastica is likely unhistorical. This account relates that, following Magnús' death, Arnulf was forced from Ireland by Muirchertach, only to return about twenty years later, whereupon he remarried the latter's daughter, and died following the feast. Eminent authorities assert that Arnulf left by his wife Lafracoth, a daughter, Alice, who married Maurice FitzGerald, Lord of Lanstephan.

== Legacy ==
Our limbs are cut off, we are lacerated, our necks condemned to death, and chains are put on our arms. The honest man's hand is branded by burning metals. A woman [now] lacks her nose, a man his genitals. [More] dire losses of our faculties follow, and prison shuts us in for many years. Serfdom is brought to the neck with a meat-hook, and learns that nothing can be had at will.

— from Planctus Ricemarch, by Rhygyfarch ap Sulien

There are numerous instances where contemporaries noted members of the Montgomery family for unusual cruelty—Robert de Bellême in particular. According to Historia ecclesiastica, Mabel was murdered by a vassal, a particular act that may evidence her unpleasantness. (Note: The narration of Mabel's demise preserved by Historia ecclesiastica—that she was slain in bed whilst resting after taking a bath—may not be an accurate account of events. The details may have been borrowed from the epic tradition of a warrior's death in a bath, dating as far back as the tales of Agamemnon.) Historia ecclesiastica describes Hugh de Montgomery as the only "mild and loveable" (mansuetus et amabilis) of Mabel's sons, whilst Welsh sources present him in a much more negative light. A source concerning Arnulf may be Planctus Ricemarch, a sorrowful Latin lament composed by scholar Rhygyfarch ap Sulien. This source—a contemporary composition bewailing the cultural upheaval and oppression inflicted upon the Welsh after the Anglo-Norman conquests of 1093—may refer to subjugation suffered under Arnulf and his father.

The actions of the Montgomery family illustrate the remarkable speed at which Norman families could spread across far-flung regions. Although Norman families tended to practice primogeniture, the conquest of England and the opening up of Britain contributed a new area of exploitation for landless younger sons of the aristocracy. The careers of younger sons of the Anglo-Norman aristocracy are often obscure, with few surviving sources documenting their activities. The younger sons of Roger de Montgomery and Mabel are an exception, and Arnulf's career illustrates the various opportunities available to contemporaries of his rank—men who could not rely upon inheritance alone, and who had to acquire territories of their own. Despite losing his lands later in his career, Arnulf's numerous and regular attestations in court circles reveal that he retained substantial personal prestige. The far-flung nature of these attestations may well indicate that his skills as a negotiator were well-known and valued. Indeed, Arnulf's career reveals the importance of personal-connections in the courtly-world of the Anglo-Norman era.

Arnulf's family—traced with certainty only two patrilineal generations previous—derived its surname from lands now known as Sainte-Foy-de-Montgommery and Saint-Germain-de-Montgommery, in Calvados, Normandy. Although descendants of Arnulf's siblings survived for several generations, the family's toponymic surname died with Arnulf.

== Ancestry ==
Ancestors of Arnulf de Montgomery

4. Roger de Montgomery (Note: Roger de Montgomery, Arnulf's paternal-grandfather, was a leading Norman magnate. He is the earliest certain member of the Montgomery family on record. Surviving sources give contradictory accounts of this earliest generation of the Montgomerys. According to an interpolated genealogy within the eleventh-century Gesta Normannorum Ducum, Arnulf's paternal grandfather was instead a certain Hugh, husband of Josceline. Nevertheless, the author of this interpolation, Robert de Torigni, contradicted this line of descent in his De immutatione ordinis monachorum, which identifies Arnulf's paternal grandfather as Roger de Montgomery. A charter to the abbey of Troarn reveals that Arnulf's grandfather was indeed named Roger. One possibility is that it was the father of Arnulf's paternal grandfather that was named Hugh, and that the wife of the latter was named Josceline.)
9. Josceline (Note: Surviving sources give contradictory accounts of Josceline's parentage. According to Robert de Torigni's interpolated Montgomery pedigree within Gesta Normannorum Ducum, Josceline's mother was Wevia, sister of Gunnor, wife of Richard, Count of Rouen. According to a pedigree composed by Ivo, Bishop of Chartres, however, Josceline's mother was Senfria, sister of Gunnor. Although the identity of Josceline's mother is uncertain, her apparent kinship with Gunnor—and thereby kinship with the ruling family of Normandy—could well have been the catalyst for the documented rise of the Montgomery family in the first half of the eleventh century.)
2. Roger de Montgomery (died 1094) (Note: Roger's mother was still living in 1068. She may have been named Emma.)
1. Arnulf de Montgomery (c.1066 – 1118×1122)
12. William de Bellême (died c.1028)
6. William de Bellême (fl. 1060)
13. Maud
3. Mabel de Bellême (died 1077)
14. Arnulf
7. Hildeburg
