= Montgomerie family =

de Montgomerie
- Noble family
- Coat of Arms of the House of Montgomery
- Country: Duchy of Normandy; Kingdom of France; Kingdom of England; Principality of Wales
- Founded: c. 11th century
- Titles: Count of Alencon; Count of Ponthieu; Count of La Marche; Earl of Arundel; Earl of Shrewsbury; Earl of Sussex; Earl of Pembroke; Earl of Chichester; Vicomte of the Hiémois; Seigneur de Montgomery; Seigneur de Belleme; Seigneur de Sées; Lord of Bowland; Lord of Pembroke; Lord of Lancaster; Lord of Holderness; Lord of Worfield; Lord of Eye
- Connected families: House of Normandy; House of Belleme
- Estates: Arundel Castle; Pembroke Castle; Montgomery Castle; Bridgnorth Castle; Shrewsbury Castle; Château de Gisors; Chateau de Ballon; Chateau de Domfront; Chateau d'Argentan; Château de Bellême

The Montgomery family or de Montgomerie is a prominent family of Norman origin, belonging to both French and British nobility. At the turn of the 12th century, the family was one of the leading families, with Robert de Bellême being the wealthiest and most powerful magnate in England and Normandy. The House was succeeded by the House of Belleme.

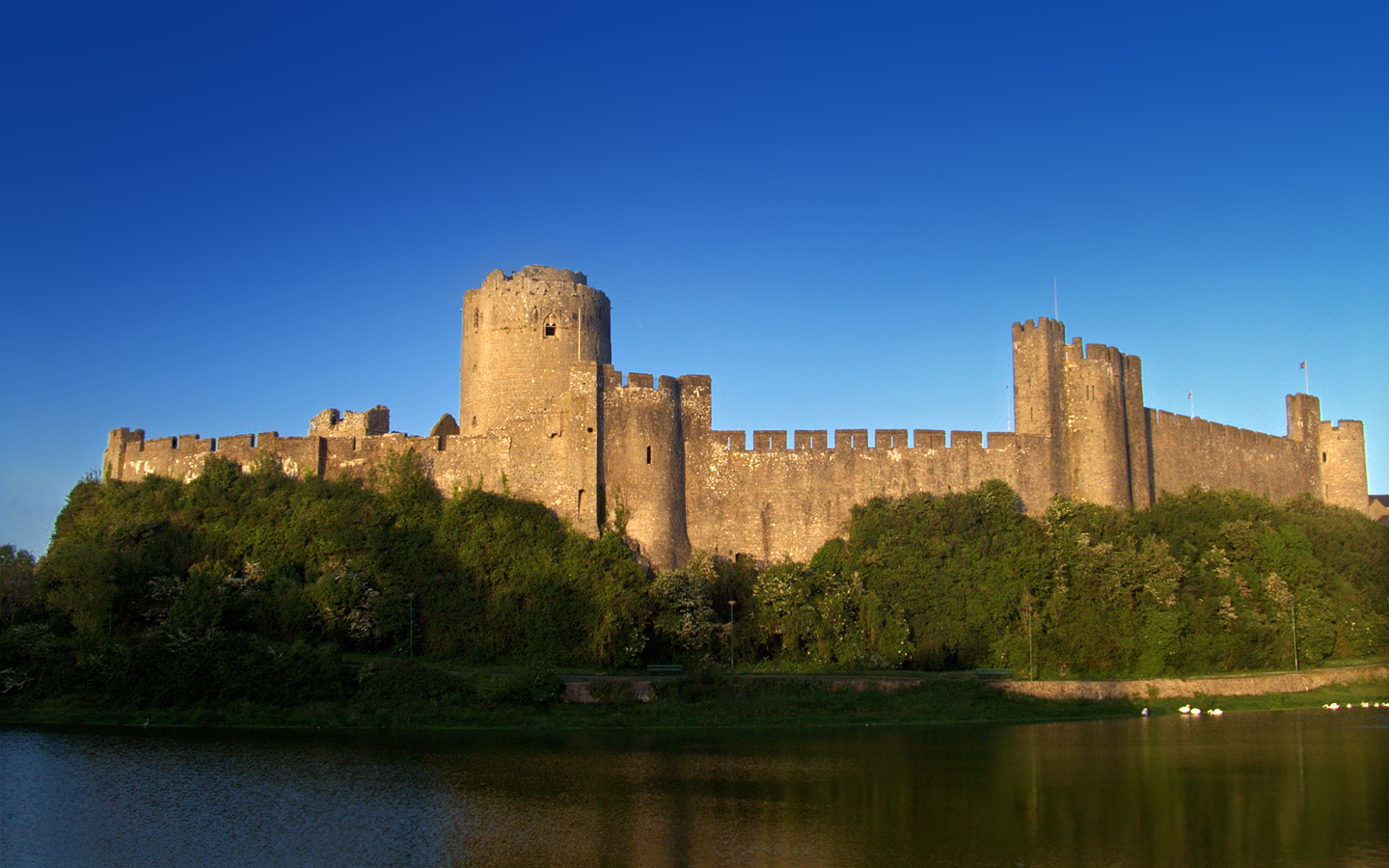
Pembroke Castle, Wales, built by Arnulf de Montgomery

== History ==
The original family rose to prominence during the 10th century in the new Duchy of Normandy. Roger de Montgomery, seigneur of Montgomery, was a relative, probably a grandnephew, of the Duchess Gunnor, wife of Duke Richard I of Normandy, member of the House of Normandy. This Richard was the great-grandfather of William and a grandson of the Viking Rollo who had previously founded Normandy. The elder Roger de Montgomery had large holdings in that region, chiefly in the valley of the Dives in central Normandy, which his son, Roger, would inherit. This Roger was one of William the Conqueror's principal counsellors, playing a major role in the Council of Lillebonne by agreeing to contribute sixty ships for the invasion of England. He joined William in his conquest of England in 1066 with an army. For his services, he was rewarded with estates and titles. Also known as "Roger the Great", he would become the first Earl of Shrewsbury, Arundel and Sussex, and give the family name to the county of Montgomeryshire, in neighbouring Wales. Through marriage, he allied himself with the powerful House of Belleme, from which he would acquire the titles of seigneur de Bellême, count of Alençon and count of Ponthieu. After his death in 1094, the Welsh will organized an attack and conquer all their estates in Wales, leaving only Pembroke Castle standing to this day.

At the beginning of the 12th century, the family will support Robert Curthose for the succession to the throne of England, following the death of William the Conqueror. His brother, Henry I of England, would end up winning the war and Robert and the Montgomeries would end up losing much of their estates and possessions. This event would be the major reason of their downfall. Many members would be forced to exile, one of which would be Arnulf de Montgomery, who would make an alliance with the High King of Ireland, Muirchertach Ua Briain, by marrying his daughter. Thereafter, many members of the Montgomeries will ally themselves with other houses in Europe, notably with the House of FitzGerald, the House of Burgundy, the House of Blois, the House of Capet, the House of Warenne, and many others.

== Notable offspring ==
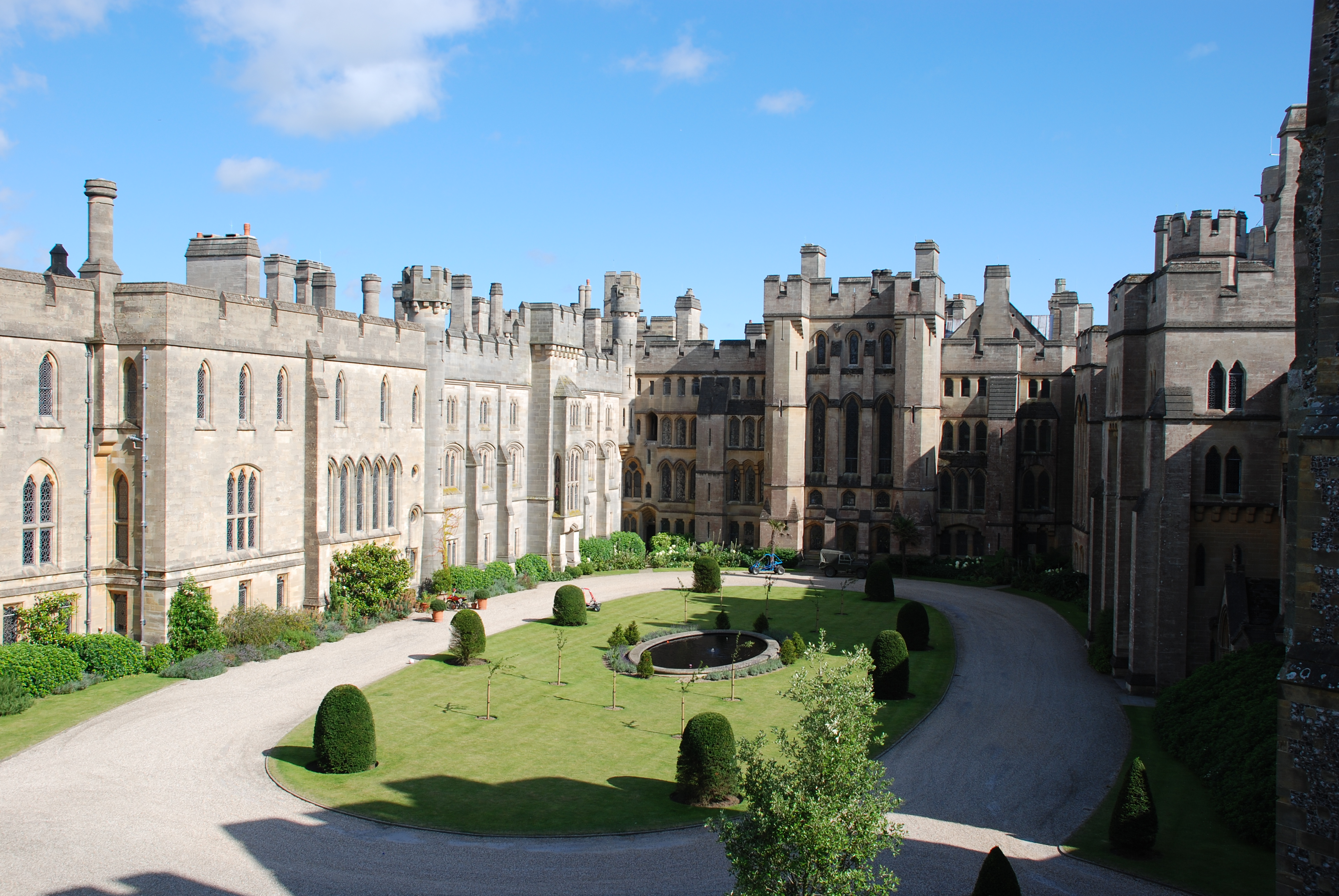
Arundel Castle, England, built by Roger de Montgomery

- Roger de Montgomery, seigneur of Montgomery († 1048), member of the family of William the Conqueror, grandnephew of Archbishop Robert II, regent of Normandy for William.
- Gilbert de Montgomery († 1040), who in 1063 was claimed by Orderic to have been poisoned by Countess Mabel de Bellême
- Roger de Montgomery, 1st Earl of Shrewsbury († 1094), counselor to William the Conqueror, held 159 manors, his estates amounted to 3% of England's gdp
- Hugh of Montgomery, 2nd Earl of Shrewsbury († 1098), fought against the King of Norway, Magnus Barefoot, at the Battle of Anglesey Sound. He was also known as Hugh the Red.
- Arnulf de Montgomery (c. 1066 - c. 1120), married to Lafracota, daughter of the King of Munster, Muirchertach Ua Briain. He established himself at Pembroke and was styled the Earl of Pembroke.
- Robert de Bellême († 1130), 3rd Earl of Shrewsbury and Count of Ponthieu, was an Anglo-Norman nobleman, and one of the most prominent figures in the competition for the succession to England and Normandy between the sons of William the Conqueror. A member of the powerful House of Bellême, he held 34 castles and 3 abbeys and was the richest magnate of both England and Normandy.
- Matilda de Montgomery, married to Robert, Count of Mortain and 2nd Earl of Cornwall, who was the half-brother of William the Conqueror
- William III of Ponthieu, (c. 1093 – 1172), married to Helie, daughter of Eudes I, Duke of Burgundy of the House of Burgundy. Via his mother, he inherited the county of Ponthieu.
- Guy II of Ponthieu (c. 1120 - 25 December 1147) was the son of William III of Ponthieu and Helie of Burgundy, daughter of the Duke of Burgundy. Fought the Second Crusade.
- John I, Count of Alençon († 24 February 1191), Count of Alençon, son of William III Talvas, Count of Ponthieu, and Helie of Burgundy, of the House of Burgundy.
- William IV, Count of Ponthieu, married to Princess Alys, daughter of Louis VII, King of France and Queen Constance of Castile. Alys was initially betrothed to Richard the Lionheart.
- Robert I, Count of Alençon, his daughter Mathilde married to Theobald VI, Count of Blois, of the House of Blois, great-grandson of Eleanor of Aquitaine, Queen of England.
- Roger the Poitevin, fought with Lord Rufus of Richmond Castle and Count Odo, brother-in-law of William the Conqueror, against the Prince-Bishop William de St-Calais of Durham Castle.

== See also ==
- House of Bellême
- Count of Ponthieu
- Counts of Alençon
- Earls of Eaglesham, Eglinton and Ardrossan
- Clan Montgomery
