= List of earls in the reign of William II of England =

The following individuals were Earls during the reign of William II of England who reigned from 1087 to 1100.

The period of tenure as Earl is given after the name of each individual, including any period of minority.

Earl of Buckingham

Walter Giffard, 1st Earl of Buckingham (1097–1102)

Earl of Chester (Second creation)

Hugh d'Avranches, Earl of Chester (1071–1101)

Earl of Cornwall (Second creation)

Robert, Count of Mortain (1072–1095)

William, Count of Mortain (1095–1106)

Earl of Huntingdon Earl of Northampton

Simon I de Senlis, Earl of Huntingdon-Northampton jure uxoris (1090–1111)

Earl of Northumbria

Robert de Mowbray (1086–1095)

Earl of Richmond

Alan Rufus (1066–1093)

Alan the Black (1093–1098)

Stephen, Count of Tréguier (1098-c.1136)

Earl of Shrewsbury

Roger de Montgomery, 1st Earl of Shrewsbury (1068–1094)

Hugh of Montgomery, 2nd Earl of Shrewsbury (1094–1098)

Robert of Bellême, 3rd Earl of Shrewsbury (1098–1102)

Earl of Surrey

William de Warenne, 1st Earl of Surrey (1088)

William de Warenne, 2nd Earl of Surrey (1088–1101 and 1103–1138)

Earl of Warwick

Henry de Beaumont, 1st Earl of Warwick (1088–1119)

Roger de Beaumont, 2nd Earl of Warwick (1119–1153)

== Sources ==
- Geoffrey Ellis, Earldoms in Fee: A Study in Peerage Law and History (London, 1963).
- C. P. Lewis, ‘The Early Earls of Norman England’ (1990) Anglo-Norman Studies Vol. XIII, 207 - 223.
