= Army of Robert Curthose on the First Crusade =

Norman-led army under Robert Curthose during the First Crusade

The army of Robert Curthose, Duke of Normandy, left for the Holy Land on the First Crusade. Robert was the eldest son of William the Conqueror and brother to William Rufus, king of England. He was reportedly so poor that he often had to stay in bed for lack of clothes. In order to raise money for the crusade he mortgaged his duchy to his brother William II of England. His army joined the contingent of Robert II, Count of Flanders, and Stephen, Count of Blois.

The known members of the army, mostly from Normandy and England, included the ones listed below, as reported in histories of the First Crusade. Unless otherwise noted, references are to the on-line database of Riley-Smith, et al., and the hyperlinks therein provide details including original sources. The names below are also referenced in the Riley-Smith tome, Appendix I: Preliminary List of Crusaders. Those references are not shown unless they appear elsewhere in the text of the book. Articles that are hyperlinked to a more detailed article in this encyclopædia rely on the latter for references.

== Household and clergy ==
According to Runciman, the number of non-combatants in a Crusader army was less than 25%. Those who are known include:

- Stephen of Aumale, nephew of William the Conqueror
- Pagan Peverel, Standard-bearer of Robert. After his return from the Crusades, he was granted a barony in England. His daughter Matilda donated land to the Kerswell Priory.
- Gilbert (Giselbert), later Bishop of Evreux, who was present at the council of Clermont
- Alan of Dol-de-Bretagne, seneschal of the archbishopric of Dol-de-Bretagne. Alan’s nephew was Alan fitz Flaad, a renowned Breton knight, a mercenary of King Henry I.
- Mainfinit, seneschal of Alan Fergent. His followers included Geoffrey, son of Deriadoc.
- Arnulf of Chocques, chaplain of Robert and later Latin Patriarch of Jerusalem
- Fulcher of Chartres, priest and historian
- Geoffrey Chotard, procer of Ancenis
- Robert of Rouen, who became Bishop of Ramle-Lydda after its capture by the Crusaders.
- Odo of Bayeux, Bishop of Bayeux and half-brother of William the Conqueror

== Nobles, knights and other soldiers ==
Among the nobles, knights and other combatants in the army of Robert were:

- Aubrey of Grandmesnil and his brother Ivo, Sheriff of Leicester, sons of Hugh of Grandmesnil. Their brother William deserted the army and joined the Byzantines.
- Alan IV, Duke of Brittany (Alan Fergant). Alan was first part of the Army of Hugh the Great and distinguished himself at the siege of Nicaea.
- Arnulf (Ernulf) of Hesdin, Lord of Chipping Norton
- Rotrou III, Count of Perche
- William of Bayeux, related to Hugh de Grandmesnil (likely the same person as William FitzRanulf, son of Ranulf, Viscount of Bayeux and Mathilde d'Avranches)
- Ralph of Gaël, Earl of East Anglia, and his wife Emma de Gauder, Countess of Norfolk. Ralph and Emma died on the journey to Jerusalem in 1096.
- Alan of Gaël, son of Ralph of Gaël
- Walter of Saint-Valéry and his sons Bernard II and Eudon, part of the Houses of Montlhéry and Le Puiset
- Conon of Lamballe, grandson of Odo, Count of Penthièvre, originally in the army of Hugh the Great
- Gerard of Gournay-en-Bray, accompanied by his wife Edith. Gerard was originally in the army of Hugh the Great.
- Guy of Sarce, who sold the fiefs he held from the abbey of St. Vincent to participate in the Crusade
- Hamo of La Hune,
- Hervey, son of Dodeman
- Philip the Grammarian of Bellême, son of Roger de Montgomerie, 1st Earl of Shrewsbury, and Mabel de Bellême. Philip was implicated in Robert of Mowbray’s rebellion on 1095, imprisoned but fled. He died in the siege of Antioch.
- Hugh Bunel, who killed Mabel de Bellême, of the House of Bellême, after she took his lands by force. After this murder, he took service with Emperor Alexios Komnenos along with his brothers.
- Pagan of Mondoubleau
- Ralph the Younger of Montpinçon
- Riou of Lohéac. Roiu obtained a casket of relics that included part of the True Cross and a piece of the Holy Sepulcher.
- Roger of Barneville, killed during the siege of Antioch and was buried in the church of St. Peter there.
- William of Ferrieres
- William de Percy (William Percy of Topcliff).

== The relationship with other armies ==
It is believed that Robert’s army was the same size as the Army of Godfrey of Bouillon. In addition, after Hugh the Great abandoned the Holy Land, approximately 100 knights under his command joined Robert’s army.

== Sources ==
- Riley-Smith, Jonathan, The First Crusaders, 1095-1131, Cambridge University Press, London, 1997
- Runciman, Steven, A History of the Crusades, Volume One: The First Crusade and the Foundation of the Kingdom of Jerusalem, Cambridge University Press, London, 1951
- Bury, J. B., Editor, The Cambridge Medieval History, Volume III: Germany and the Western Empire, Cambridge University Press, London, 1922
- J. S. C. Riley-Smith, Jonathan Phillips, Alan V. Murray, Guy Perry, Nicholas Morton, A Database of Crusaders to the Holy Land, 1099-1149 (available on-line)
- David, Charles Wendell, Robert Curthose, Duke of Normandy, Harvard Historical Studies, 25, Cambridge, 1920.
