= Roger de Montgomery, seigneur of Montgomery =

French nobleman of the House of Montgomery

Roger de Montgomery, signeur of Montgomery
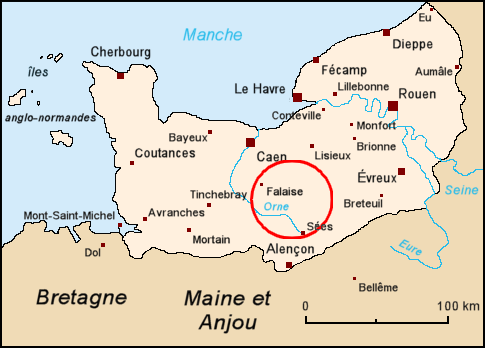
- Map and location of the Hiémois in medieval Normandy
- Died: 7 February 1055; Paris
- Noble family: House of Montgomery
- Spouse: Josceline (daughter of Sainsfrida {Senfrie}).
- Issue: Hugh de Montgomery; Robert de Montgomery; Roger II; William de Montgomery; Gilbert de Montgomery
- Father: unknown
- Mother: unknown

Roger de Montgomery (died 7 February 1055), was seigneur of Montgomery, viscount of the Hiémois, and a member of the House of Montgomery.

== Life ==
No near-contemporary source gives Roger's parentage. The younger Roger de Montgomery, actually son of this Roger, was instead said by chronicler Robert of Torigni to have been born to a Hugh de Montgomery by Josseline, niece of Gunnor, Duchess of Normandy. One possible interpretation of this clear misstatement is that a generation has been dropped, and that it was the elder Roger who was son of Hugh and Josseline, though others conclude that Josseline's husband was the elder Roger, the assignment of the name Hugh to her husband being the error. Though Robert de Torigni calls Josceline daughter of Wevia, sister of Gunnor, a letter from the reign of Henry I states she was daughter of another sister, Senfria.

Roger held the lands of Saint-Germain-de-Montgommery and Sainte-Foy-de-Montgommery, both of which show traces of early castles. He acquired the office of vicomte of the Hiémois probably about the time Robert I became Duke in 1027. (Note: Douglas dates Roger I being vicomte of the Hiémois to an earlier period under duke Richard II when Robert I was given the countship of Hiémois. See David Douglas, The Earliest Norman Counts, EHR, 61-240 (1946) 146 n. 1.) In c. 1031–1032 he witnessed a charter to the abbey of St. Wandrille by Robert I, Duke of Normandy as vicomte. Like Duke Robert, Roger began acquiring church properties, among these, c. 1025–27, half the town of Bernay. He took over a wood at 'Crispus Fagidus' which belonged to Jumièges Abbey in the 1030s. He suppressed a market held by the same abbey and transferred it into his own domain. He later returned the market to the abbey and paid restitution for their losses.

In 1035 at Robert I's death, his great uncle, Robert Archbishop of Rouen ruled Normandy as regent. Roger seems to have lost favor with the young duke as well as his vicomte office as he signed an early charter of Duke William simply as Roger of Montgomery. At the archbishop’s death in 1037, anarchy broke out in Normandy and among the rebels was Roger de Montgomery, formerly one of Duke Robert's closest companions, who, after being defeated in his own territory, fled to the court of Henry I of France. Roger had been forced into exile by Osbern the Steward who was afterwards killed by William de Montgomery, Roger's son. Roger died on 7 February 1055, in exile in Paris. In 1068 his wife was still holding lands at Bures and Saint-Pair.

== Family ==
Roger married Josceline, daughter of Sainsfrida [Senfrie]. Interpolating William of Jumièges provides the names of Roger's five sons:

- Hugh de Montgomery
- Robert de Montgomery
- Roger II de Montgomery, 1st Earl of Shrewsbury
- William de Montgomery killed during the minority of duke William
- Gilbert de Montgomery who in 1063 was claimed by Orderic to have been poisoned by Mabel de Bellême

== Sources ==
- Gem, Richard (2026). "The Patronage of Ear Roger and Countess Adelais: Much Wenlock Priory, Shrewsbury Abbey, and Quatford College, c. 1070 to c. 1094/1102". In New, Elizabeth; McNeill, John (eds.). Shropshire: Art, Architecture and Archaeology from Roman Wroxeter to the Sixteenth Century. Taylor & Francis. pp. 63–97. ISBN 9781040445945.
