= Hugh Bunel =

11th-century Norman warrior

Hugh Bunel (fl. 1077–1099) was a Norman warrior. He was the son of Robert d'Ige and set to inherit La Roche-Mabile in northern France from him. After his inheritance was taken by Mabel de Bellême, Bunel and his three brothers entered Mabel's castle where Bunel decapitated her. The men afterwards fled into exile in Italy and Byzantium before, pursued by bounty hunters, they joined the Saracen army. When Robert Curthose, who had inherited Normandy, reached Jerusalem on the First Crusade, Bunel pledged allegiance to him and provided him with details of Saracen tactics.

== Murder of Mabel de Bellême ==
Bunel was the son of Robert d'Ige, his brothers were Ralph, Richard and Goislin. Bunel had been deprived of his inheritance of La Roche-Mabile by Mabel de Bellême in 1077. On 2 December 1079, Bunel and his brothers sneaked into Mabel's castle at Bures. They reached Mabel's chamber after she had completed a bath and was heading to bed. Bunel cut off Mabel's head with his sword.

The party made their escape, destroying bridges behind them to hamper the pursuit. This tactic was particularly successful as the local watercourses were in a state of flood. Mabel's son Hugh of Montgomery led the pursuit with 16 knights. The murder became one of the most infamous of the period. English chronicler Orderic Vitalis noted that "when the murder of this terrible lady had been accomplished many rejoiced at her fate". William Pantulf, who had also been deprived of his inheritances by Mabel, came under suspicion for the murder after his return from Italy. He escaped punishment after passing an ordeal of hot iron.

== In exile ==
The murder left Bunel as a wanted man; in addition to Mabel's sons he was pursued by agents of his liege lord William the Conqueror, Duke of Normandy. Bunel and his brothers fled into exile to Apulia followed by Sicily and then Byzantium where they entered the service of Emperor Alexios I Komnenos (r. 1081-1118). Mabel's sons sent emissaries across Europe seeking the brothers and their agents followed them to Apulia, Sicily and Byzantium. A bounty was placed on the brothers' heads and they left Byzantium fearful that they would be killed for it or found by agents of the Conqueror. The brothers went to live in the Muslim world and entered service with a Saracen army. Bunel learnt Arabic and adopted the manners of the Saracens. In 1096, Robert Curthose, the Conqueror's eldest son and successor as Duke of Normandy, raised an army to participate in the First Crusade in the Holy Land.

On 7 June 1099, Curthose and his army were besieging Jerusalem when Bunel, clad in a fine set of armour, presented himself. Bunel offered to advise Curthose, whom he regarded as his true liege lord, on Saracen tactics and to assist with directing his army. This offer was accepted and Bunel also acted as a translator to Curthose. There is no evidence that Hugh ever received his ancestral lands in Normandy in return for his service to Curthose but it does seem to have put an end to his pursuit over the murder.
