= Robert of Bellême, 3rd Earl of Shrewsbury =

11th/12th century Anglo-Norman nobleman

Robert of Bellême, Earl of Shrewsbury
- Born: c. 1052
- Died: after 1130 (aged 77–78); Wareham, Dorset
- Noble family: House of Bellême
- Spouse: Agnes of Ponthieu
- Issue: William III of Ponthieu
- Father: Roger of Montgomery, 1st Earl of Shrewsbury
- Mother: Mabel de Bellême

Robert of Bellême (c. 1052 – after 1130), seigneur de Bellême (or Belèsme), seigneur de Montgomery, viscount of the Hiémois, 3rd Earl of Shrewsbury and Count of Ponthieu, was an Anglo-Norman nobleman, and one of the most prominent figures in the competition for the succession to England and Normandy between the sons of William the Conqueror. He was a member of the powerful House of Bellême.

Robert became notorious for his alleged cruelty. Referring to his activities in the rebellion against Henry I of 1110–1112, the chronicler Orderic Vitalis, in Book XI of his Historia Ecclesiastica, calls Robert "grasping and cruel, an implacable persecutor of the Church of God and the poor ... unequalled for his iniquity in the whole Christian era", as well as "the tyrant who had disturbed the land and was preparing to add still worse crimes to his many offences of plundering and burning". The stories of his brutality may have inspired the legend of Robert the Devil.

== Early life ==
Robert was the oldest surviving son of Roger of Montgomery, 1st Earl of Shrewsbury and Mabel de Bellême, born probably between 1052 and 1056. In 1070 after the death of his great-uncle Yves Bishop of Séez his parents brought him to Bellême, which at that time became his mother's inheritance, and as the oldest surviving son it would eventually be his. (Note: His older brother Roger died young, before 1060–62 when Robert attested a charter for St. Aubin of Angers. This placed Robert in line to obtain his parents' inheritances in Normandy, where the law distinguished between acquisitions and inheritances. Acquisitions were those lands obtained by conquest or purchase, while a parent's (typically father's) Norman ancestral lands were heritable by the eldest son. This was later codified in the Leges Henrici Primi which stated: "The Ancestral fee of the father is to go to the first-born son; but he may give his purchases or later acquisitions to whomsoever he prefers". For a time after the Conquest, this took the form of the eldest son, now Robert, inheriting the Norman lands of his ancestors while the second son, Hugh, was given the English honors his father had acquired.)

In 1073, when the Conqueror invaded Maine, Robert was knighted by William at the siege of Fresnay castle. By now, probably of age and independent of his father, he took part in the 1077 revolt of the young Robert Curthose against Duke William. (Note: Robert was typical of his generation, the sons of William's companions who had earned their great honors and titles at the battle of Hastings in 1066. This newer generation did not share the values and attitudes of their fathers but rather had different experiences altogether. They had inherited their wealth and status, not earned it. Yet this next generation expected royal favor and patronage without attending court or serving the king in any capacity. They often rebelled when they felt they were not being treated with the dignity and respect they deserved.) When Robert's mother, Mabel, was killed c. 1079, Robert inherited her vast estates but at this point Duke William took the added precaution of garrisoning the Bellême castles with his own soldiers, which was his ducal right. On hearing the news of William the Conqueror's death in 1087, Robert's first act was to expel the ducal garrisons from all his castles.

== Rebellion of 1088 ==
At the end of 1087 Robert Curthose, Duke of Normandy was told of a plot to place him on the throne of England in his brother William II's place, a plot that Duke Robert enthusiastically approved and supported. Robert, his brother Hugh de Montgomery and a third brother, either Roger or Arnulf, participated in this rebellion. The main conspirators, however, were Odo of Bayeux, Eustace III, Count of Boulogne, Robert de Mowbray, Geoffrey de Montbray, Earl Roger de Montgomery and other disaffected Magnates. The next year in the Rebellion of 1088, beginning at Easter the rebels burned and wasted the king's properties and those of his followers. At some point, Roger of Montgomery detached himself from supporting Robert Curthose through negotiations with the king. Finally Robert was among the rebels who found themselves defending Rochester Castle. When William Rufus blockaded the town and built two counter-castles, the garrison began negotiating for surrender under honourable terms, being allowed to keep their lands and serve the king. This Rufus refused; he was furious and had initially wanted the traitors hanged, "or by some other form of execution utterly removed from the face of the earth." Roger of Montgomery and other great barons interceded with the King, Earl Roger on behalf of his sons, until finally, in July, a semi-honorable surrender was negotiated between the king and the rebels. Rufus, albeit reluctantly, guaranteed the rebels' life and limb and gave them safe conduct.

== Return to Normandy ==
Coincidentally, Robert sailed back to Normandy in the company of Count Henry (later king Henry I), who had not been part of the conspiracy against his brother William Rufus. However well they got along on the voyage, they were destined to become bitter enemies. One thing more they shared in common was the extreme resentment by Odo, Bishop of Bayeux who, banished from England, had returned to Normandy ahead of Henry and Robert. Henry at just 20 years of age was now Odo's overlord, which Odo strongly resented, and Robert de Bellême was a powerful and dangerous disruptive force in Normandy now free to do as he would. Odo, who held great sway over Duke Robert, convinced him that both Henry and his travel companion Robert were now conspiring with William Rufus against the duke. Both Henry and Robert were seized as they disembarked and, both placed in the Bishop's custody, were imprisoned; Henry at Bayeux and Robert at Neuilly-l'Évêque, now Neuilly-la-Forêt.

On hearing his son was imprisoned, Roger de Montgomery, Earl of Shrewsbury, immediately went to Normandy and put all his castles in a state of readiness against the duke. At this point, the Montgomery family was in a state of rebellion against Robert Curthose. Bishop Odo now instigated Duke Robert to take all the castles of Robert by force and the duke gathered an army and proceeded against them. Duke Robert first attacked Ballon and after losses on both sides, the castle surrendered. Moving on to the castle of Saint-Céneri where the family of Robert was residing, Robert Quarrel had been told by Earl Roger to resist the duke at all costs, and this was done until the provisions eventually failed. Duke Robert was so enraged at such resistance he blinded Robert Quarrel and mutilated the castle defenders. At this point, the duke lost interest in attempting to capture any more of Robert de Bellême's castles; he dissolved the forces and returned to Rouen. Earl Roger sent peace envoys to the duke and convinced him to release his son Robert, which the fickle duke finally did. The price of his son's release, however, was the castle of Saint-Céneri, which Duke Robert gave to Robert Giroie as castellan. The Giroies had long held the castle until, as punishment for their rebellion in the 1060s, William the Conqueror gave this castle and other Giroie lands to Roger de Montgomery, who, as a member of the Bellême family, was also considered their nemesis.

By 1090, Robert was back in Robert Curthose's good graces, Orderic Vitalis calling him a "principal councilor" to duke Robert. He supported Curthose in putting down a revolt by the citizens of Rouen, in 1090, and took considerable numbers of the citizens captive, throwing them into dungeons. According to Robert of Torigni in 1092, the inhabitants of Domfront, long a Bellême-Montgomery stronghold, invited Henry, the duke's younger brother to take possession of Domfront. Apparently, they had grown weary of Robert's oppressive and abusive style of lordship. No explanation was offered for what happened to Robert's garrison contingent or who exactly facilitated the bloodless takeover. In addition, Robert had requested that same year to hold Bellême of the French crown instead of the Duke of Normandy.

In 1094, Robert's father, Earl Roger, died. Robert's younger brother Hugh of Montgomery, 2nd Earl of Shrewsbury inherited the English lands and titles, while Robert inherited his father's Norman properties, which included good part of central and southern Normandy, in part adjacent to the Bellême territories he had already inherited from his mother.

== William Rufus (1096–1100) ==
In 1096, Robert Curthose took up the cross on the First Crusade and left the custody of the duchy to his brother William Rufus, King of England. Robert regained the favour of Rufus, and both he and his brothers were in his service on several occasions. In 1098 he captured Elias I, Count of Maine for Rufus, a significant feat.

In 1098, Robert's younger brother Hugh died, and Robert inherited, on payment of £3,000 in relief, the English properties that had been their father's, including the Rape of Arundel and the Earldom of Shrewsbury. Robert had also acquired the countship of Ponthieu jure uxoris and the honour of Tickhill; all of which combined made him the wealthiest magnate in both England and Normandy.

In August 1100, at the death of Rufus, Henry I seized the English throne before his brother Robert Curthose could claim it. While Robert rushed to England to pay homage to Henry, he and his brothers must have seen this as the end of royal favour for the Montgomerys.

== Anglo-Norman Civil War 1101 ==
Robert Curthose returned from the First Crusade in triumph. According to Orderic, Curthose was being encouraged to attack Henry by his barons but he remained indecisive until Ranulf Flambard, having escaped from the Tower of London, fled to Normandy where he appears to have influenced Duke Robert to go ahead with his invasion of England and depose his brother Henry. Robert was one of the great magnates who joined Robert Curthose's 1101 invasion of England, along with his brothers Roger the Poitevin and Arnulf of Montgomery and his nephew William, Count of Mortain. This invasion, however, which aimed to depose Henry I, ended bloodlessly in the Treaty of Alton which called for amnesty for the participants but allowed traitors to be punished. It quickly became evident that Henry I had no intentions of abiding by the treaty of Alton; "Soothe them with promises" advised Robert, Count of Meulan just before the battle, then they can be "driven into exile".

Henry I took a year compiling charges against Robert and his brothers and Robert's unlicensed castle building, and specifically Bridgnorth Castle may have been the last straw for Henry. Henry had a series of charges drawn up against Robert in 1102, and when Robert refused to answer for them, gathered his forces and besieged and captured Robert's English castles. Robert lost his English lands and titles (as did his brothers), was banished from England, and returned to Normandy.

In 1105, Robert was warring with Rotrou III, Count of Perche over a large portion of his Bellême lands and lost. That same year, he attacked a force of Henry's supporters, then went to England before Christmas to attempt to make peace with King Henry, but he returned to Normandy empty-handed.

== Battle of Tinchebrai and after ==
In 1106 Robert was one of Curthose's commanders at the Battle of Tinchebrai, commanding the rear division and, when the battle turned in Henry's favour, he and most of those with him avoided capture by fleeing the field. With Normandy now under Henry's rule, Robert de Bellême submitted and was allowed to retain his Norman fiefs and his office as viscount of the Hiémois.

However, Henry was still wary of Robert and placed his followers in key positions in Normandy. In the rebellion of 1110–12 barons on the frontier of Normandy were disgruntled over Henry's policies and especially his attempt to take custody of William Clito, son of Robert Curthose. According to Orderic, Robert played a central role in this rebellion after the death of Elias I, Count of Maine in July 1110. In 1112 Robert was sent as an envoy of the French king to Henry I at his court at Bonneville to negotiate the release of Robert Curthose, whereas Henry seized Robert and imprisoned him. Apparently Henry had charges already prepared; failing to attend Henry at his court after being summoned three times, of failing to render accounts, and of acting against his lord's interests. Technically Robert may have been guilty but arguably it was not safe for him to attend Henry, he may have regarded the revenues as gifts and it is also arguable whether the charge of acting against Henry's interests warranted the severity of the punishment. In addition, Robert was under the king's protection as an emissary sent to negotiate Robert Curthose's release. This gave the act international implications but at the time Louis VI of France and Henry I were intriguing against each other so the breach of protocol went unpunished, but with Robert's imprisonment the rebellion against Henry collapsed. Robert spent the rest of his life as a prisoner; the exact date of his death is not known.

== Historical portrayal ==
Orderic Vitalis portrays Robert as a villain, especially when compared to Henry I, whose misdemeanours the chronicler felt were excusable. Orderic calls Robert "Grasping and cruel, an implacable persecutor of the Church of God and the poor... unequalled for his iniquity in the whole Christian era." To quote David C. Douglas, "Ordericus, if credulous, was neither malicious nor a liar; and these accounts concerned people of whom he had special knowledge" [referring to the Bellême-Montgomery family] but he may have been strongly biased against Robert and his treatment of that magnate belies a moral interpretation of his actions. The basis for Orderic's animosity towards Robert and his de Bellême predecessors was the longstanding and bitter feud between the Giroie family, patrons of Orderic's Abbey of Saint-Evroul, and the de Bellême family. William Talvas (de Bellême), Robert's grandfather, had blinded and mutilated William fitz Giroie (for more on the feud between the Bellêmes and the Giroies see the article William I Talvas). He did at times appropriate church properties and was not a major donor to any ecclesiastical house but Robert's attitudes toward the church are typical of many of his contemporaries; certainly no worse than the secular rulers and other magnates of his day. The assessment of William II Rufus by R. W. Southern could well apply to Robert as well: "His life was given over to military designs, and to the raising of money to make them possible; for everything that did not minister to those ends he showed a supreme contempt".

According to William Hunt in the Dictionary of National Biography, various stories of his brutality were circulated after his death, possibly inspiring the legend of Robert the Devil, a sadistically cruel Norman knight fathered by Satan himself. In Maine, "his abiding works are pointed to as the works of Robert the Devil, a surname that has been transferred from him to the father of the Conqueror."

== Family and children ==
Robert married Agnes of Ponthieu, before 9 September 1087, and they had one child:

- William III of Ponthieu, who via his mother inherited the county of Ponthieu.

== Notes ==
Peerage of England
| Preceded by Hugh of Montgomery | Earl of Shrewsbury; 1098–1102 | Forfeit |
