= Roger de Montgomery, 1st Earl of Shrewsbury =

11th-century Norman nobleman and earl in England

Roger de Montgomery
- Coat of arms of the Montgomerys
- Died: 1094
- Noble family: Montgomery family
- Spouses: Mabel de Bellême; Adelaide du Puiset
- Issue: Robert de Bellême; Hugh de Montgomery; Roger; Philip 'the Grammarian'; Arnulf de Montgomery; Sibyl; Emma; Matilda (Maud); Mabel; Roger; Everard (son of Adelaide)
- Father: Roger de Montgomery
- Mother: unknown

Roger de Montgomery (died 1094), also known as Roger the Great, was the first Earl of Shrewsbury, and Earl of Arundel, in Sussex. His father was Roger de Montgomery, seigneur of Montgomery, a member of the House of Montgomery, and was probably a grandnephew of the Duchess Gunnor, wife of Duke Richard I of Normandy, the great-grandfather of William the Conqueror. The elder Roger had large landholdings in central Normandy, chiefly in the valley of the River Dives, which the younger Roger inherited.

== Life ==
Roger inherited his father's estates in 1055. By the time of the Council of Lillebonne, which took place in about January 1066, he was one of William the Conqueror's principal counsellors, playing a major role at the Council. He may not have fought in the initial invasion of England in 1066, instead staying behind to help govern Normandy. According to Wace's Roman de Rou, however, he commanded the Norman right flank at Hastings, returning to Normandy with King William in 1067.

Afterward, Roger was entrusted with land in two regions critical for the defence of the Kingdom of England. At the end of 1067 or early in 1068, William gave Roger nearly all of what is now the county of West Sussex, a total of 83 manors, which at the time of the Domesday Survey (1086) was an area known as the Rape of Arundel; and about 1071 Roger was granted estates in Shropshire which amounted to some seven-eighths of the whole county; he was also made Earl of Shrewsbury, but it is uncertain that the earldom came to him at the same time as the land, and it may have been a few years later. In 1083, Roger founded Shrewsbury Abbey.

Roger was one of the half-dozen greatest magnates in England during William the Conqueror's reign. The Rape of Arundel was eventually split into two "rapes", one keeping the name of Arundel, the other being called the Rape of Chichester.

Besides his estates in Sussex and Shropshire, Roger had others in Surrey (four manors), Hampshire (nine manors), Wiltshire (three manors), Middlesex (eight manors), Gloucestershire (one manor), Worcestershire (two manors), Cambridgeshire (eight manors), Warwickshire (eleven manors), and Staffordshire (thirty manors). The income from Roger's estates amounted to about £2,000 per year, and in 1086 the income of all the land in England was around £72,000. The £2,000 (equivalent to several million in 2022) was almost 3 per cent of the nation's GDP.

After William I's death in 1087, Roger joined with other rebels to overthrow the newly crowned king, William II, in the Rebellion of 1088. However, William was able to convince Roger to abandon the rebellion and to side with him. This worked out favourably for Roger, as the rebels were beaten and lost their land holdings in England.

== Family ==
Roger married Mabel de Bellême, who was heiress to a large territory straddling the border between Normandy and Maine. The medieval chronicler Orderic Vitalis paints a picture of Mabel of Bellême being a scheming and cruel woman. She is reported to have attempted to poison Arnold de Echauffour but her brother-in-law drank the poison instead. She was murdered by Hugh Bunel and his brothers who, possibly in December 1077, rode into her castle of Bures-sur-Dive and cut off her head as she lay in bed. Their motive for the murder was that Mabel had deprived them of their paternal inheritance. Roger and Mabel had 10 children:

- Robert de Bellême, Count of Alençon in 1082, he succeeded his younger brother Hugh as 3rd Earl of Shrewsbury. He married Agnes, Countess of Ponthieu and died in 1131.
- Hugh of Montgomery, 2nd Earl of Shrewsbury, died without issue 1098.
- Roger the Poitevin, Vicomte d'Hiemois, married Adelmode de la Marche.
- Philip 'the Grammarian'.
- Arnulf of Montgomery, married Lafracota, daughter of King Muirchertach Ua Briain.
- Sibyl of Montgomery, she married Robert Fitzhamon, Lord of Creully.
- Emma, abbess of Almenêches.
- Matilda (Maud) of Montgomery, she married Robert, Count of Mortain and died c. 1085. He was a half-brother of William the Conqueror.
- Mabel of Montgomery, she married Hugh de Châteauneuf.
- Roger of Montgomery, died young.

Roger then married Adelaide du Puiset, by whom he had one son, Everard, who entered the Church.

After his death in 1094, Roger's estates were divided. His eldest surviving son, Robert of Bellême, received the bulk of the Norman estates (as well as his mother's estates); the next son, Hugh, received the bulk of the English estates and the Earldom of Shrewsbury. After Hugh's death, the elder son Robert inherited the earldom.

== Sources ==
- Brown, R. Allen; Chibnall, Marjorie (1979). Proceedings of the Battle Conference on Anglo-Norman studies: 1978. London: Boydell Press. ISBN 0-85115-107-8.
- Mason, J. F. A., "Roger de Montgomery and His Sons (1067–1102)", Transactions of the Royal Historical Society, 5th series vol. 13 (1963) 1–28
- Thompson, Kathleen, "The Norman Aristocracy before 1066: the Example of the Montgomerys", Historical Research 60 (1987) 251–263
- Stirnet: Montgomery01

Peerage of England
New creation	Earl of Shrewsbury; 1074–1094	Succeeded by Hugh of Montgomery
