= La Brévière =

- Part of Val-de-Vie
- Location of La Brévière
- Location within France Location within Normandy
- Coordinates: 48°58′24″N 0°09′52″E
- Country: France
- Region: Normandy
- Department: Calvados
- Arrondissement: Lisieux
- Canton: Livarot-Pays-d'Auge
- Commune: Val-de-Vie
- Area^{1}: 3.53 km^{2} (1.36 sq mi)
- Elevation: 90 m (300 ft)
- Highest elevation: 182 m (597 ft)
- Lowest elevation: 69 m (226 ft)
- Population (2023): 103
  - Density: 29.2/km^{2} (75.6/sq mi)
- Time zone: UTC+01:00 (CET)
  - Summer (DST): UTC+02:00 (CEST)
- Postal code: 14140
- ^{1} French Land Register data, which excludes lakes, ponds, glaciers > 1 km^{2} (0.386 sq mi or 247 acres) and river estuaries.

La Brévière (French pronunciation: [la bʁevjɛʁ]) is a former commune in the Calvados department in the Normandy region in northwestern France. On 1 January 2016, it was merged into the new commune of Val-de-Vie.

== See also ==
- Communes of the Calvados department
