= La Chapelle-Haute-Grue =

- Part of Val-de-Vie
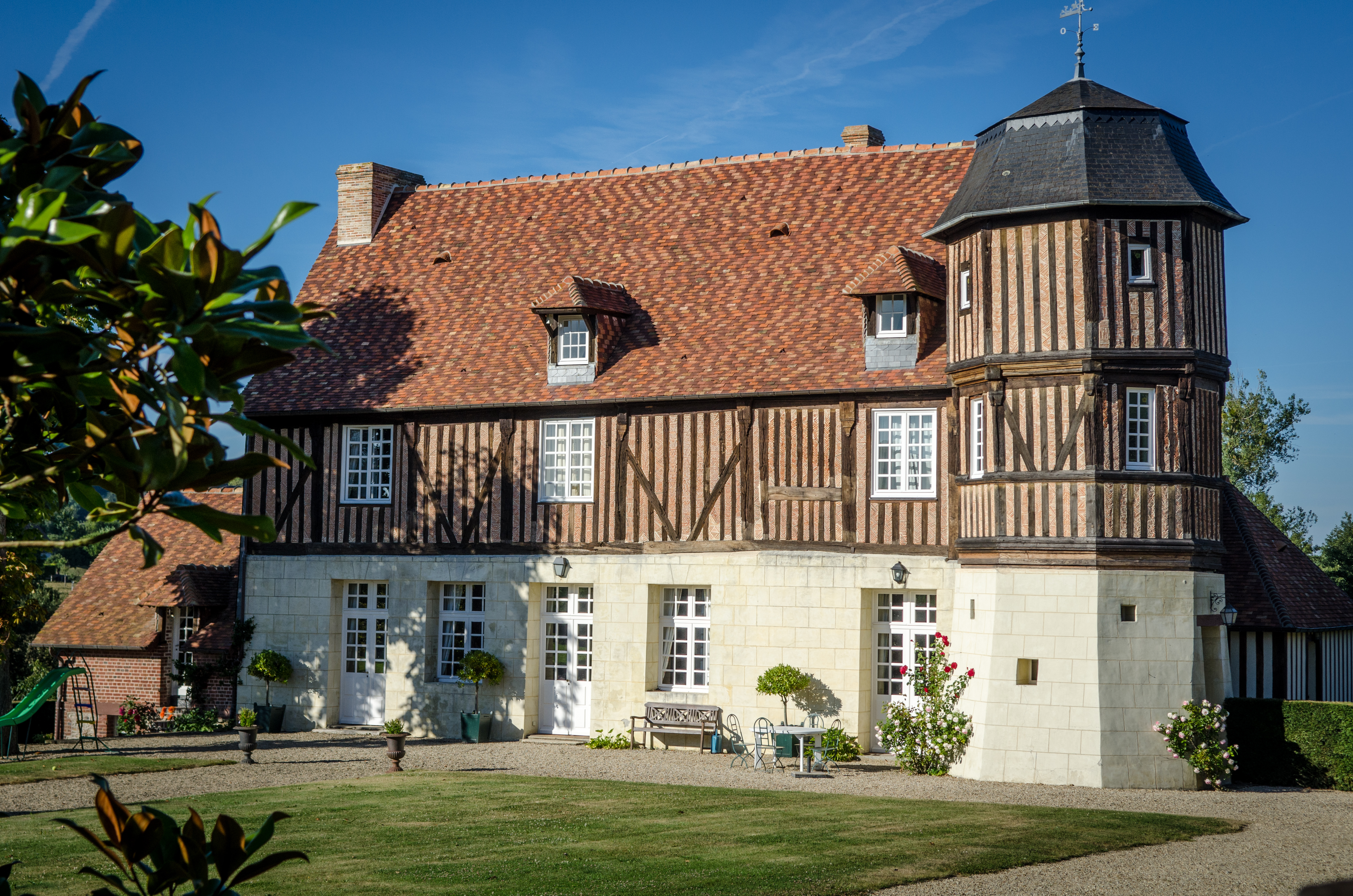
- Manoir of Caudemone
- Location of La Chapelle-Haute-Grue
- Location within France Location within Normandy
- Coordinates: 48°58′03″N 0°08′54″E
- Country: France
- Region: Normandy
- Department: Calvados
- Arrondissement: Lisieux
- Canton: Livarot-Pays-d'Auge
- Commune: Val-de-Vie
- Area^{1}: 2.92 km^{2} (1.13 sq mi)
- Elevation: 90 m (300 ft)
- Highest elevation: 192 m (630 ft)
- Lowest elevation: 70 m (230 ft)
- Population (2023): 67
  - Density: 23/km^{2} (59/sq mi)
- Time zone: UTC+01:00 (CET)
  - Summer (DST): UTC+02:00 (CEST)
- Postal code: 14140
- ^{1} French Land Register data, which excludes lakes, ponds, glaciers > 1 km^{2} (0.386 sq mi or 247 acres) and river estuaries.

La Chapelle-Haute-Grue (French pronunciation: [la ʃapɛl ot ɡʁy]) is a former commune in the Calvados department in the Normandy region in northwestern France. On 1 January 2016, it was merged into the new commune of Val-de-Vie.

== See also ==
- Communes of the Calvados department
