= Saint-Germain-de-Montgommery =

- Part of Val-de-Vie
- Coat of arms
- Location of Saint-Germain-de-Montgommery
- Location within France Location within Normandy
- Coordinates: 48°56′38″N 0°10′25″E
- Country: France
- Region: Normandy
- Department: Calvados
- Arrondissement: Lisieux
- Canton: Livarot-Pays-d'Auge
- Commune: Val-de-Vie
- Area^{1}: 8.13 km^{2} (3.14 sq mi)
- Elevation: 174 m (571 ft)
- Highest elevation: 233 m (764 ft)
- Lowest elevation: 83 m (272 ft)
- Population (2023): 157
  - Density: 19.3/km^{2} (50.0/sq mi)
- Time zone: UTC+01:00 (CET)
  - Summer (DST): UTC+02:00 (CEST)
- Postal code: 14140
- ^{1} French Land Register data, which excludes lakes, ponds, glaciers > 1 km^{2} (0.386 sq mi or 247 acres) and river estuaries.

Saint-Germain-de-Montgommery (French pronunciation: [sɛ̃ ʒɛʁmɛ̃ də mɔ̃ɡɔmʁi]) is a former commune in the Calvados department in the Normandy region in northwestern France. On 1 January 2016, it was merged into the new commune of Val-de-Vie.

== See also ==
Roger de Montgomery
