= Warenne Chronicle =

Norman chronicle

The Warenne Chronicle, also known as the Hyde Chronicle and Chronicon monasterii de Hida iuxta Winton ab anno 1035 ad 1121, is a chronicle concerning the history of England and Normandy at about the time of the Norman Conquest. The chronicle exists in the form of a thirteenth-century manuscript which is preserved on folios 4r–21v of British Library Cotton MS Domitian A XIV. It may have been written for William of Blois, Count of Boulogne and his wife, Isabel de Warenne, Countess of Surrey, to give an account of her grandfather, William de Warenne, 2nd Earl of Surrey.
