= Val-de-Vie =

- Commune
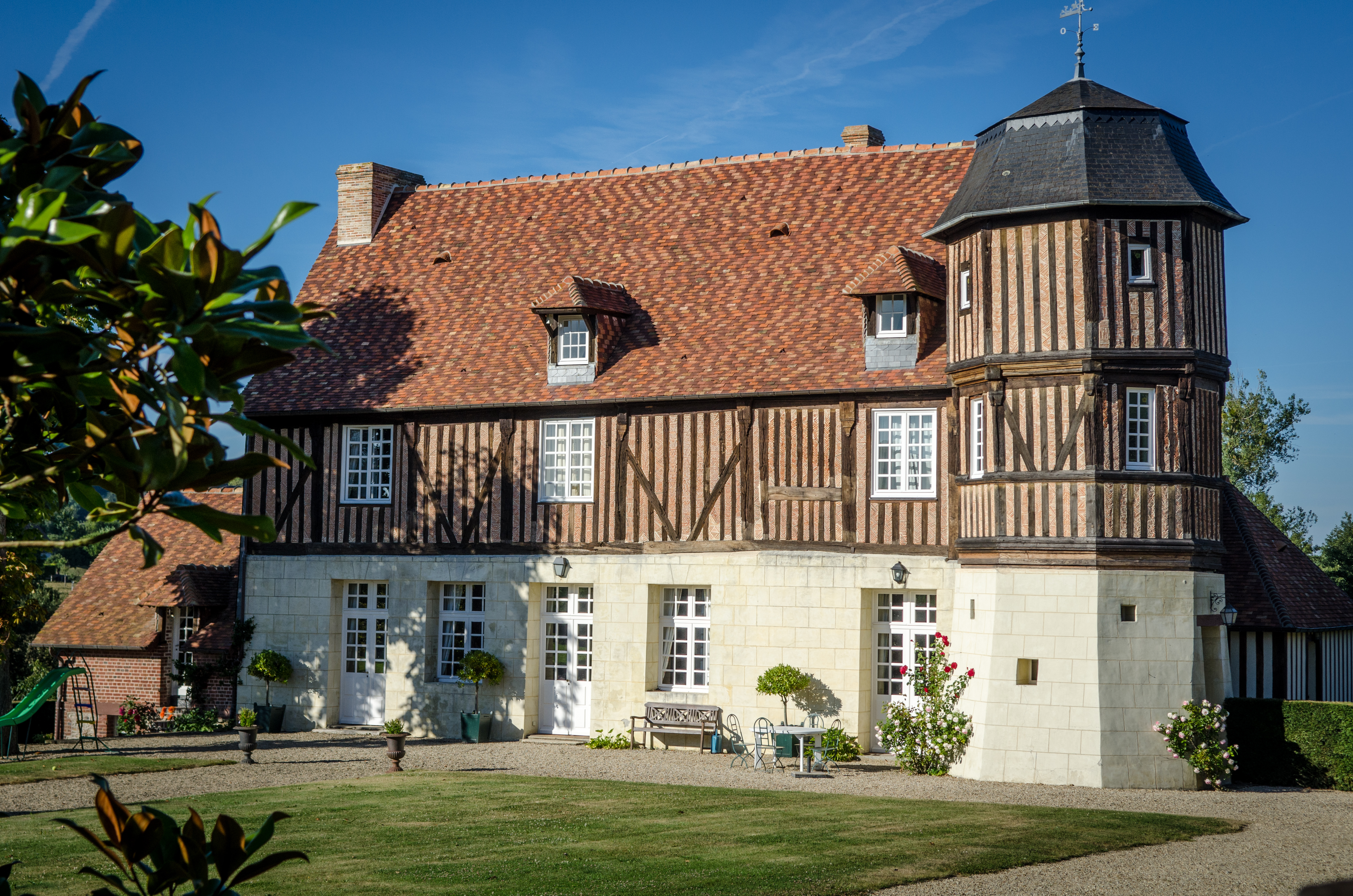
- Caudemone Manor in La Chapelle-Haute-Grue
- Location of Val-de-Vie
- Location within France Location within Normandy
- Coordinates: 48°57′43″N 0°10′26″E
- Country: France
- Region: Normandy
- Department: Calvados
- Arrondissement: Lisieux
- Canton: Livarot-Pays-d'Auge
- Intercommunality: CA Lisieux Normandie

Government
  - Mayor (2020–2026): Jean-Paul Saint-Martin
- Area^{1}: 19.17 km^{2} (7.40 sq mi)
- Population (2023): 502
  - Density: 26.2/km^{2} (67.8/sq mi)
- Time zone: UTC+01:00 (CET)
  - Summer (DST): UTC+02:00 (CEST)
- INSEE/Postal code: 14576 /14140
- ^{1} French Land Register data, which excludes lakes, ponds, glaciers > 1 km^{2} (0.386 sq mi or 247 acres) and river estuaries.

Val-de-Vie (French pronunciation: [val də vi]) is a commune in the department of Calvados, northwestern France. The municipality was established on 1 January 2016 by merger of the former communes of Sainte-Foy-de-Montgommery, La Brévière, La Chapelle-Haute-Grue and Saint-Germain-de-Montgommery. It is named for its location in the valley of the Vie River.

== Notable people ==
Roger de Montgomery, seigneur of Montgomery

== See also ==
- Communes of the Calvados department
