= Battle of Anglesey Sound =

1098 battle

- Part of the Norman invasion of Wales and Magnus Barefoot's First Irish Sea campaign
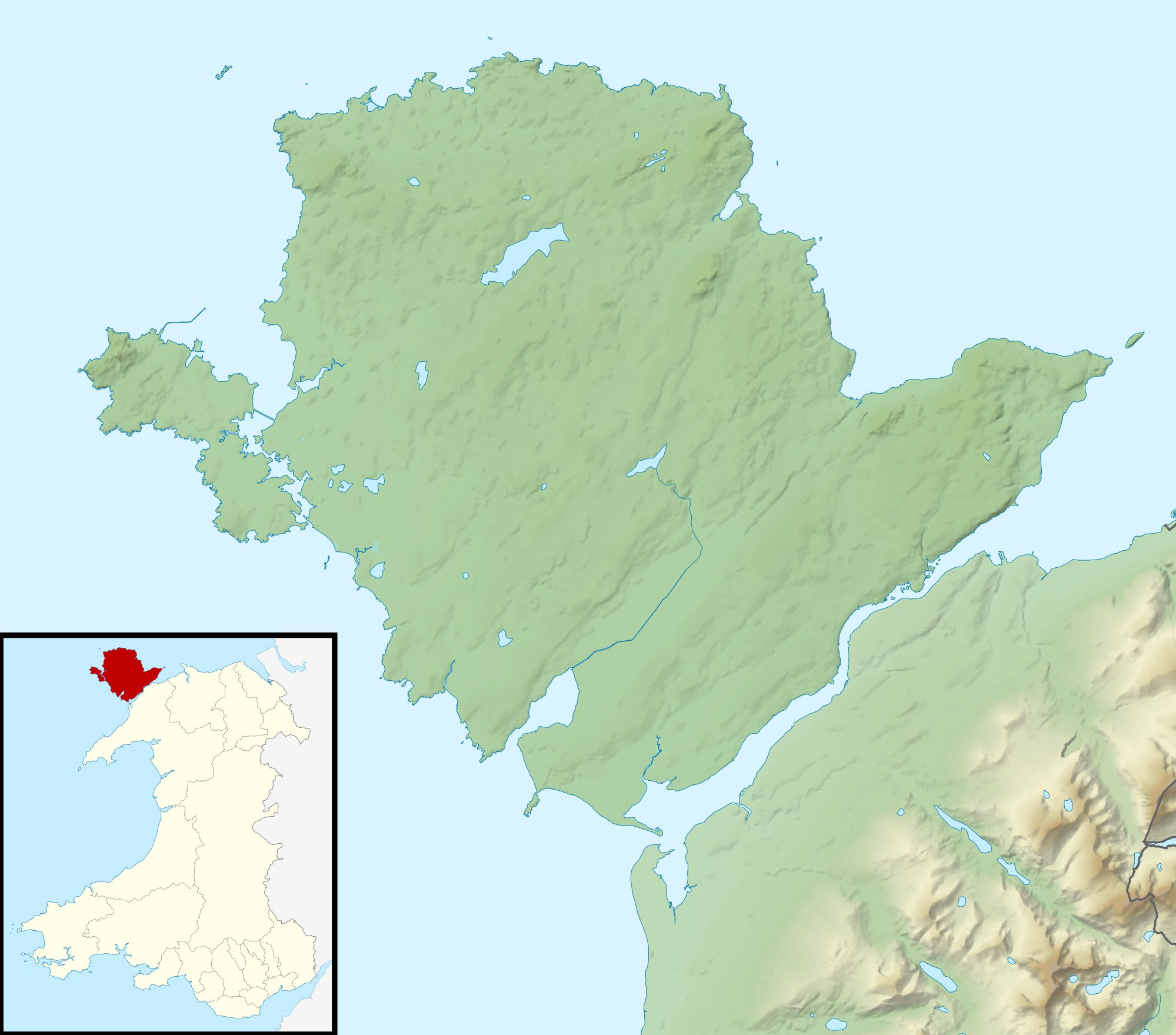
- Map of Anglesey
Date	June or July 1098
Location	Menai Strait, Anglesey, Wales
Result	Norwegian victory
Territorial changes	Nominal Norwegian control of Anglesey; Gwynedd regained by Gruffudd ap Cynan

Belligerents
Kingdom of England	Kingdom of Norway: Kingdom of the Isles

Commanders and leaders
Hugh of Montgomery †; Hugh d'Avranches	Magnus Barefoot

Strength
Unknown	Six ships (Orderic Vitalis)

The Battle of Anglesey Sound was fought in June or July 1098 on the Menai Strait ("Anglesey Sound"), separating the island of Anglesey from mainland Wales. The battle was fought between Magnus Barefoot, King of Norway, and the Anglo-Norman earls Hugh of Montgomery and Hugh d'Avranches, and took place as part of Magnus Barefoot's expedition into the Irish Sea, which sought to assert Norwegian rule over the Kingdom of the Isles.

Only a few days after the Normans had captured Anglesey from the Welsh, Magnus Barefoot appeared with some ships off the coast. Fighting soon began with arrows shot between the Norwegian ships and Norman forces on the shore, but as Hugh of Montgomery was hit with an arrow and killed, the Normans retreated back to England. The defeat of the Normans allowed for the return of the exiled Gruffudd ap Cynan, King of Gwynedd, who thereby regained control of his former lands.

== Background ==
Following their invasion of England in 1066, and the subsequent conquest of large parts of Wales, the Normans proceeded towards North Wales in the late 11th century. While the Normans experienced a setback in 1094, the Norman earls Hugh of Montgomery and Hugh d'Avranches finally managed to conquer North Wales and Anglesey in 1098, forcing Gruffudd ap Cynan, King of Gwynedd, to flee to Ireland.

Early in 1098, the Norwegian king Magnus Barefoot went on an expedition with a large fleet into the Irish Sea, seeking to assert Norwegian rule over the Kingdom of the Isles. After he had subdued most of the Isles and set up his base on Mann, he went further south and appeared with six ships (according to the English chronicler Orderic Vitalis), off the coast of Anglesey, only a few days after the Norman capture.

== Battle ==
According to Orderic Vitalis, Magnus entered the Menai Strait with a red shield on the mast, which was the usual sign to signal peace and trade. While Magnus may have sought trade, or to get provisions for his ships, he may also have intended to take possession of the island as a base for further operations. When Magnus approached Anglesey in June or July, the Normans did not permit him to land. The fighting started with the two sides shooting arrows at each other, the Norwegians while still on board their ships, and the Normans while standing on the shore. As the Normans prepared to attack the Norwegians, Hugh of Montgomery, who was fully armoured except for an opening for his eyes, was shot through one eye with an arrow and died instantly.

Contemporary non-Norse sources all agree that Magnus Barefoot himself was responsible for the shot, while the Norse sagas are somewhat less inclined to attribute the decisive shot to Magnus alone, noting that his shot hit Hugh almost simultaneously with that of another of his men. Since some sources indicate that Magnus regretted the deed when he realised whom he had killed, Magnus may originally have been interested in alliances with the Normans. The Normans retreated from Anglesey to England following the defeat.

== Aftermath ==
Although the Welsh considered the Norwegians their liberators following the Norwegian victory against the Normans, Magnus regarded Anglesey as part of the Kingdom of the Isles and seemed to think of the island as a being in his possession. Since the Norwegians never settled on the island, Anglesey reverted to Welsh control when Gruffudd ap Cynan returned from Ireland in 1099. The Norwegians never controlled any Welsh territory, but Gruffudd awarded Magnus with great rewards and honour, and during Magnus' second expedition in 1102 allowed him to cut as much timber as he wanted.

== See also ==
- Magnus Erlendsson, Earl of Orkney

== Bibliography ==
- Ashley, Michael (1998). British Monarchs: The Complete Genealogy, Gazetteer, and Biographical Encyclopedia of the Kings & Queens of Britain. Robinson. ISBN 9781854875044.
- Førsund, Randi Helene (2012). Titlestad, Bård (ed.). Magnus Berrføtt. Sagakongene (in Norwegian). Saga Bok/Spartacus. ISBN 978-82-430-0584-6.
- Hudson, Benjamin (2005). Viking Pirates And Christian Princes: Dynasty, Religion, And Empire In The North Atlantic. Oxford University. ISBN 9780195162370.
- Maund, K. L. (1991). Ireland, Wales and England in the Eleventh Century. Boydell & Brewer. ISBN 9780851155333.
- Munch, P.A., ed. (1874). Chronica regnum Manniae et insularum: The Chronicle of Man and the Sudreys. Vol. 1. Translated by Goss, Alexander. Douglas, Isle of Man: The Manx Society.
- Nicholas, Thomas (2000) [1872]. Annals & Antiquities of the Counties & County Families of Wales. Vol. 2. Genealogical Publishing Com. ISBN 9780806313146.
- Oram, Richard (2011). Domination and Lordship: Scotland, 1070–1230. University of Edinburgh. ISBN 978-0-7486-1497-4.
- Power, Rosemary (October 1986). "Magnus Barelegs' Expeditions to the West". The Scottish Historical Review. 65 (180, part 2). Edinburgh University Press: 107–132. ISSN 0036-9241.
- Power, Rosemary (2005). "Meeting in Norway: Norse-Gaelic relations in the kingdom of Man and the Isles, 1090 –1270" (PDF). Saga-Book. XXIX (196). Viking Society for Northern Research, University College London: 5–66. ISSN 0305-9219. Archived from the original (PDF) on 2013-04-12.
