= Mabel de Bellême =

11th-century Norman noblewoman

- Born: 1030s
- Died: 2 December 1079; Bures, Orne, Normandy
- Noble family: House of Bellême
- Spouses: Roger II de Montgomery, later 1st Earl of Shrewsbury
- Issue Detail: Robert of Bellême, 3rd Earl of Shrewsbury; Hugh of Montgomery, 2nd Earl of Shrewsbury; Roger the Poitevin; Arnulf de Montgomery
- Father: William I Talvas
- Mother: Hildeburg

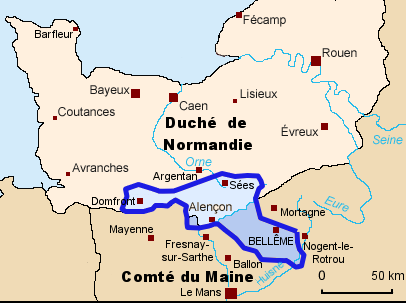
Extension of the lordship of Bellême in the middle of the 11th century

Mabel de Bellême (1030s −1079) was a Norman noblewoman. She inherited the lordship of Bellême from her father and later became Countess of Shrewsbury through her husband. She was a member of the House of Bellême.

== Life ==
Mabel was the daughter of William I Talvas and his first wife Hildeburg. She was the heiress of her father’s estates, her half-brother Oliver apparently being excluded, inheriting on his death in 1060. She also inherited the remainder of the Bellême honour in 1070 at the death of her uncle Yves, Bishop of Séez and Lord of Bellême. When their father was exiled by her brother Arnulf in 1048 she accompanied him until both were taken in by the Montgomery family. Between 1050–1054 she married Roger II de Montgomery, later 1st Earl of Shrewsbury. Roger II de Montgomery was already a favourite of Duke William and by being given in marriage to Mabel it increased his fortunes even further.

Mabel's husband Roger had not participated in the Norman conquest of England, but had remained behind in Normandy as co-regent along with William's wife, Matilda of Flanders. He had also contributed 60 ships to Duke William's invasion force. He joined the king in England in 1067 and was rewarded with the earldom of Shrewsbury and a number of estates to the point that he was one of the largest landholders in the Domesday Book.

Mabel and her husband Roger transferred the church of Saint-Martin of Séez to Evroul and petitioned her uncle Yves, Bishop of Séez, to build a monastery there on lands from her estates. The consecration was in 1061 at which time Mabel made additional gifts.

== Her character ==
Of all of Orderic’s female subjects Mabel was the most cunning and treacherous; if not entirely for her own misdeeds then as the mother of Robert de Bellême, who had a reputation for savagery as well as cruelty. In one passage Orderic describes her as "small, very talkative, ready enough to do evil, shrewd and jocular, extremely cruel and daring."

In perpetuating her family’s feud with the Giroie family, Mabel set her sights on Arnold de Echauffour, the son of William fitz Giroie who her father had imprisoned and mutilated. (Note: For more on the feud between the Bellêmes and the Giroies see the article William I Talvas) She obtained part of his estates when she and her husband Roger convinced Duke William to confiscate his lands. In 1063, however, Arnold was promised forgiveness by the Duke, and was to have his lands restored. To prevent this, Mabel plotted to kill Arnold. She attempted to murder him by poisoning a glass of wine but he declined to drink. Her husband's brother, refreshing himself after a long ride, drank the wine, and died instead. She later bribed Arnold's chamberlain and provided him with poison, and this time was successful. (Note: This and other stories regarding Mabel de Bellême as painted by Orderic Vitalis might seem somewhat difficult to accept on fact value and it may be tempting to simply dismiss them. But Orderic was a monk at Evroul where the Giroie family played an important part and one of Orderic's fellow monks was Rainald, son of the murdered Arnold de Echauffour. Orderic was raised in the Montgomery household and may even have met Mabel when he was a child. His father, Odelerie of Orleans, served Roger II de Montgomery, Mabel’s husband. So Orderic had important first-hand knowledge of these individuals and his own character is that of an honest monk not known to be malicious or spiteful. See: Douglas, William the Conqueror (1964), p. 414; White, 'The First House of Bellême', TRHS, 22, p. 70. Also, due to the fact that Mabel de Bellême and especially her husband Roger were closely associated with Duke William, both William of Jumièges and William of Poitiers, while certainly aware of their activities, needed to be very careful with what they recorded. Orderic, writing later after the main figures were all dead had no need of such tact and could write what he knew about them. See: François Neveux, The Normans (2006), p. 113.)

Excepting Theodoric, abbot of the abbey of Saint-Evroul, who she listened to at times, Mabel was hostile to most members of the clergy; but her husband loved the monks at Saint-Evroul so she found it necessary to be more subtle. In an incident in 1064, she deliberately burdened their limited resources by visiting the abbey for extended stays with a large retinue of her soldiers. (Note: When Mabel was murdered, Orderic was only about two years old. However, her reputation for hating and oppressing monks was well remembered at the Abbey of Saint-Evroul and elsewhere. In her use of the abbey for billeting her retinue of knights, undoubtedly for defence of her lands in the area, she was committing a gross breach of the rights of hospitality. While Orderic depicts her as a truly evil woman, he was not alone in his opinion of her. See: Kathleen Thompson, 'Family and Influence to the South of Normandy in the Eleventh Century: The Lordship of Belleme', Journal of Medieval History, 11 (1985), 215–226.) When rebuked by Theodoric the abbot for her callousness she snapped back that the next time she would visit with an even larger group. The abbot predicted that if she did not repent of her evilness she would suffer great pains and that very evening she did. She left the abbey in great haste as well as in great pain and did not abuse their hospitality again.

Mabel continued her wickedness, causing many nobles to lose their lands and become destitute. In 1077 she took the hereditary lands of Hugh Bunel by force. Two years later while coming out of her bath, she was killed by some men who had crept into the castle. Hugh had enlisted the help of his three brothers, gained entry to the castle of Bures on the Dives and struck off her head with his sword. The murderers were pursued but escaped by destroying a bridge behind them. Mabel's murder occurred on 2 December 1079 and she was buried three days later at Troarn.

== Epitaph ==
Mabel's epitaph is notable as an example of monks bowing more to “the partiality of her friends than to her own merits":

Sprung from the noble and the brave,
Here Mabel finds a narrow grave.
But, above all woman’s glory,
Fills a page in famous story.
Commanding, eloquent, and wise,
And prompt to daring enterprise;
Though slight her form, her soul was great,
And, proudly swelling in her state,
Rich dress, and pomp, and retinue,
Lent it their grace and honours due.
The border’s guard, the country’s shield,
Both love and fear her might revealed,
Till Hugh, revengeful, gained her bower,
In dark December’s midnight hour.
Then saw the Dive’s o’erflowing stream
The ruthless murderer’s poignard gleam.
Now friends, some moments kindly spare,
For her soul’s rest to breathe a prayer!

== Family ==
Mabel and her husband, Roger de Montgomery had ten children:

- Roger of Montgomery, oldest son, died young.
- Robert de Bellême, Count of Alençon in 1082, he succeeded his younger brother Hugh as 3rd Earl of Shrewsbury. He married Agnes, Countess of Ponthieu and died in 1131.
- Hugh of Montgomery, 2nd Earl of Shrewsbury, died without issue 1098.
- Roger the Poitevin, Vicomte d'Hiemois, married Adelmode de la Marche.
- Philip of Montgomery.
- Arnulf of Montgomery, married Lafracota daughter of Muirchertach Ua Briain.
- Sibyl of Montgomery, she married Robert Fitzhamon, Lord of Creully.
- Emma, abbess of Almenêches.
- Matilda (Maud) of Montgomery, she married Robert, Count of Mortain and died c. 1085.
- Mabel of Montgomery, she married Hugh de Châteauneuf.
