= Sainte-Foy-de-Montgommery =

Former commune in Calvados, France

- Part of Val-de-Vie
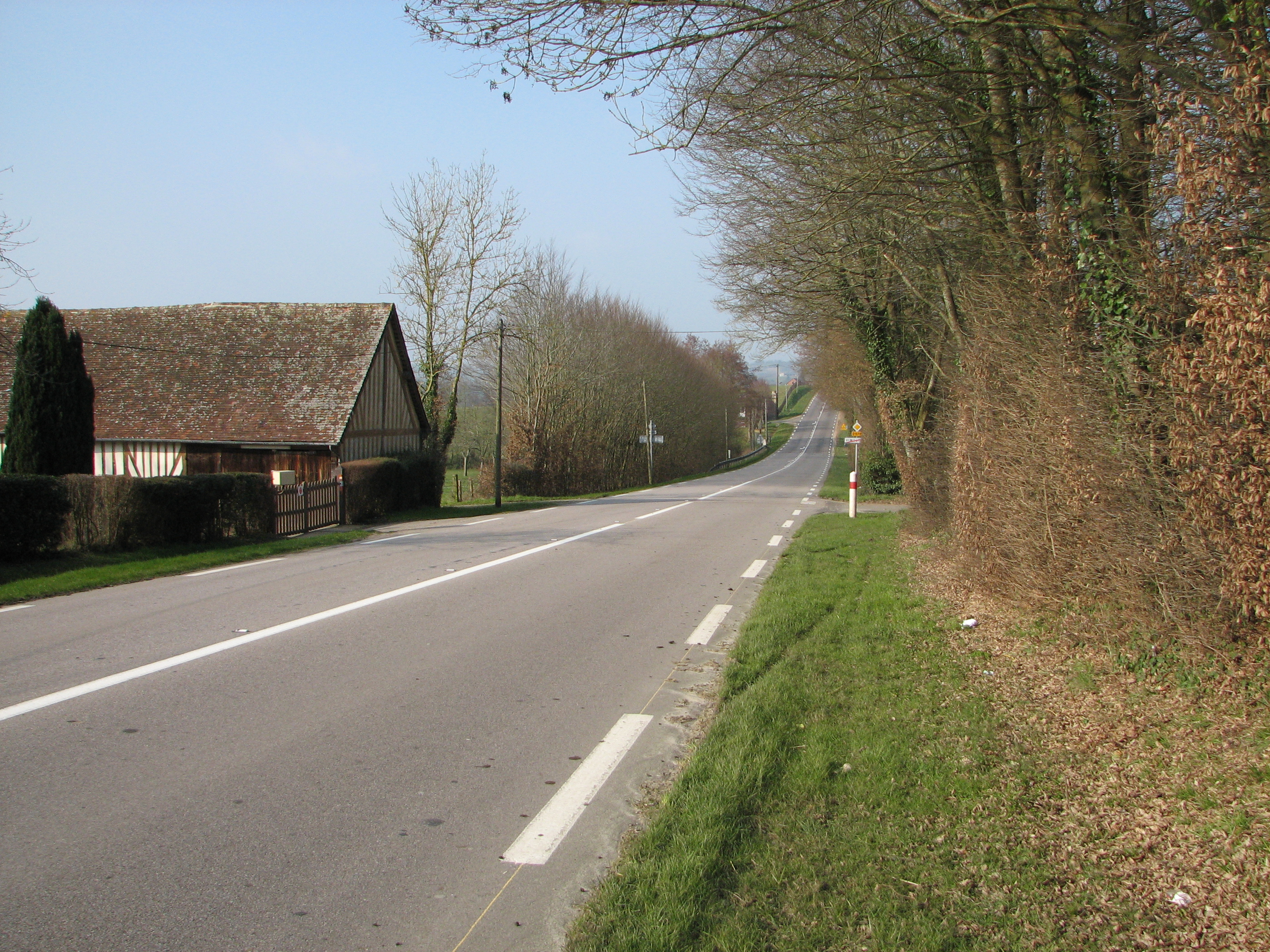

- Coat of arms
- Location of Sainte-Foy-de-Montgommery
- Location within France Location within Normandy
- Coordinates: 48.96°N 0.18°E
- Country: France
- Region: Normandy
- Department: Calvados
- Arrondissement: Lisieux
- Canton: Livarot-Pays-d'Auge
- Commune: Val-de-Vie
- Area^{1}: 4.59 km^{2} (1.77 sq mi)
- Elevation: 84 m (276 ft)
- Highest elevation: 200 m (660 ft)
- Lowest elevation: 77 m (253 ft)
- Population (2023): 175
  - Density: 38.1/km^{2} (98.7/sq mi)
- Time zone: UTC+01:00 (CET)
  - Summer (DST): UTC+02:00 (CEST)
- Postal code: 14140
- ^{1} French Land Register data, which excludes lakes, ponds, glaciers > 1 km^{2} (0.386 sq mi or 247 acres) and river estuaries.

Sainte-Foy-de-Montgommery (French pronunciation: [sɛ̃t fwa də mɔ̃ɡɔmʁi]) is a former commune in the Calvados department in the Normandy region in northwestern France. On 1 January 2016, it was merged into the new commune of Val-de-Vie.

== See also ==
- Communes of the Calvados department
