= Roger the Poitevin =

12th-century Anglo-Norman nobleman

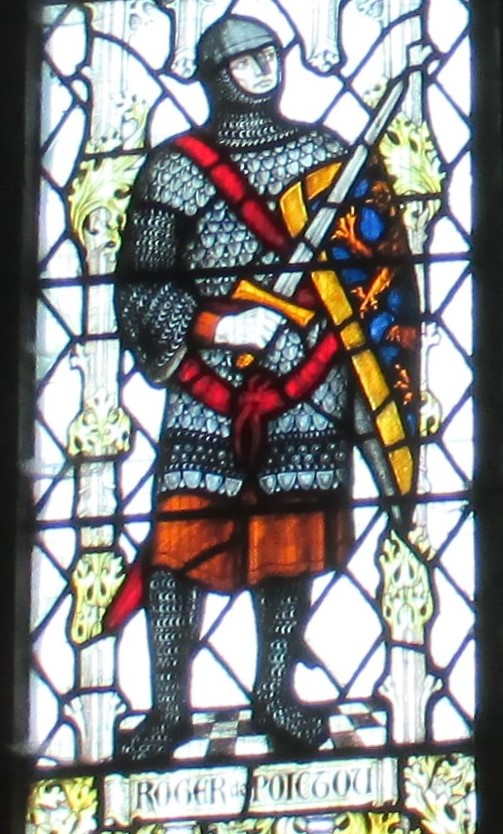
Roger the Poitevin depicted in stained glass in Lancaster Priory

Roger the Poitevin or Roger de Poitou (mid-1060s – before 1140) was an Anglo-Norman aristocrat possessing large holdings both in England and through his marriage in France during the early 12th century.

Roger was the third son of Roger of Montgomery, 1st Earl of Shrewsbury and Mabel de Bellême. The appellation "the Poitevin" was for his marriage to an heiress from Poitou.

Roger acquired a great lordship in England, with lands in Salfordshire, Essex, Suffolk, Nottinghamshire, Derbyshire, Lincolnshire, Hampshire, and North Yorkshire. The principal part of the lordship was in what was then called inter Mersam et Ripam, that is, "between the Mersey and the Ribble" and is now divided between Lancashire, Merseyside, and Greater Manchester. After 1090, he also assumed the title 1st Lord of Bowland.

Before 1086, Roger had married Almodis, daughter of Count Aldebert II of La Marche in Poitou, and sister and presumptive heiress of Count Boso III, who was childless and unmarried.

== Roger's lordship extends beyond the Ribble as far as Cumberland ==
Around 1091, Roger's brother-in-law Boso died, but Roger was apparently preoccupied with Norman and English affairs, and his wife's uncle Odo became count of La Marche.

In 1092, Roger acquired a large part of what is now northern Lancashire. These grants gave Roger effective control of all the lands north of the River Ribble to the River Lune, which formed a natural border between the secure Norman lands in England and the strongly contested Scottish frontier lands in Cumberland.

Due to long established lines of communication across Morecambe Bay, Roger also assumed authority over the regions of Furness and Cartmel; these remained a part of Lancashire until as recently as 1974. The expansion of Roger's lands followed his support of King William II Rufus's invasion of Cumbria in 1092, where Dolfin of Carlisle ruled, possibly as a vassal of Scottish King Malcolm Canmore. Dolfin was driven out and the Anglo-Scottish border was established north of Carlisle. Roger also acquired the great honour of Eye centered in Suffolk.

== 1088 and after ==
In 1088, Roger led a military force with Alan Rufus and Odo of Champagne against William de St-Calais, Bishop of Durham, at the request of William Rufus when the bishop was implicated in a revolt against the king; Roger also negotiated with the bishop on the king's behalf before the bishop went to trial.

Roger's father Roger de Montgomery died in 1094. That same year, Rufus sent Roger to hold the castle at Argentan in Normandy, but Roger surrendered it to Philip I of France on the first day of the siege; Roger and his men were held for ransom and purchased their freedom.

Although Philip I was an ally of Robert Curthose, it is thought that this action was less a betrayal of Rufus and more a result of Roger's dual vassalage between the King of England and the King of France. Roger did not lose his English lands as a result of this action but held no position in Rufus's government from this point. Roger continued to be loyal to Rufus but in 1102 joined his brothers' failed rebellion against Henry I of England in favor of Robert Curthose. As a result Roger de Poitou lost his English holdings. The King put those in Craven into the governance of Robert de Romille.

Roger then went to his wife's holdings in Poitou. Almodis's uncle Odo was ousted as count of La Marche in 1104, and subsequently the sons of Roger and Almodis are styled as count. In 1109, Roger was permitted to briefly return to England to the court of Henry I, although he did not recover his earlier English holdings. After around 1109, Roger appears to have either lost interest in governing in La Marche, or lost the political power itself as he is only seen once in the documents of La Marche as his wife and sons held the authority in the region.

== Offspring ==
The children of Roger and Almodis include:

- Aldebert IV of La Marche
- Boso IV of La Marche
- Odo II of La Marche
- Ponse of La Marche, who married Wulgrin II of Angoulême
- Avise of Lancaster, who married William "the Younger" Peverel

== Sources ==
- Keats-Rohan, K. S. B. (1993). "Errata: The Prosopograhy of Post-Conquest England: Four Case Studies". Medieval Prosopography. 14 (2 (Autumn)): 159–164.
