= Hugh of Montgomery, 2nd Earl of Shrewsbury =

Anglo-Norman aristocrat

Map showing Shropshire, a.k.a. Shrewsbury

Hugh of Montgomery, 2nd Earl of Shrewsbury (died 1098), was an Anglo-Norman aristocrat and member of the House of Bellême. He was also known as Hugh the Red.

== Life ==
Hugh was the second surviving son of Roger de Montgomerie, 1st Earl of Shrewsbury of the House of Montgomery, and Mabel de Bellême of the House of Belleme. As was typical of the first post-Conquest generation, (Note: This concerns the laws of inheritance and primogeniture, prevalent in the Pays de Caux at the time of the Conquest but the remainder of Normandy still partitioned inheritance between sons (familial paréage). This allowed the father to determine which son was to receive what portion, typically by seniority. But this was changing at the time allowing some flexibility. In Normandy the law distinguished between acquisitions and inheritances. Acquisitions were those lands obtained by conquest or purchase while his Norman ancestral lands were heritable by the eldest son. This was later codified in the Leges Henrici Primi which stated: "The Ancestral fee of the father is to go to the first-born son; but he may give his purchases or later acquisitions to whomsoever he prefers". For a time after the Conquest this took the form of the eldest son inheriting the Norman lands of his ancestors while the second son was given the English honors his father had acquired. See: James Clarke Holt, Colonial England, 1066–1215 (The Hambledon Press, London, 1997) pp. 116–121 (& notes); also C. Warren Hollister, Henry I (Yale University Press, New Haven & London, 2003), p. 47 & n.) he inherited most of his father's English possessions while his older brother Robert of Bellême inherited the vast lordship of Bellême. He was at the castle of Bures-sur-Dives in December 1079 when his mother was murdered and pursued the perpetrators but was unable to overtake them. In the summer of 1080, along with his brothers he attested a charter for the abbey of Troarn (Diocese of Bayeux) by their father "for the redemption of his soul and [those] of his relatives, and especially of his wife Mabel lately deceased; and of his sons".

In 1094 at his father's death Hugh succeeded to his father's English titles and honors as well as his Welsh lands, as Earl of Shrewsbury. In 1095 he joined in the conspiracy of those supporting Robert de Mowbray against William Rufus. In 1096 he was pardoned by William Rufus after a fine of £3,000. During his four years as earl, he spent most of his time in the Welsh Marches fighting against the Welsh. In 1098, he joined forces with Hugh d'Avranches, 1st Earl of Chester in an attempt to recover Anglesey, which had been lost in the Welsh revolt of 1094.

On or about 31 July 1098 Hugh was killed at the Battle of Anglesey Sound while fighting against a raid by King Magnus Barefoot of Norway at Anglesey, (Note: For more information see the article Battle of Anglesey Sound.) being shot dead by an arrow and falling into the sea. Among those in Magnus' party were Harold Haroldson, son of Harold Godwinson King of England. Several sources agree that it was Magnus himself who shot the arrow hitting Hugh through the eye slit in his armor while the earl was riding carelessly through the shallows.

== Succession ==
Hugh died unmarried, and his English lands and titles passed to his older brother Robert of Bellême, who became the 3rd Earl of Shrewsbury.

== Additional references ==
- "Hugh (d. 1098)", in Dictionary of National Biography, 1885–1900, Volume 28.

Peerage of England
Preceded by Roger de Montgomerie	Earl of Shrewsbury; 1094–1098	Succeeded by Robert of Bellême
