= Bures, Orne =

Bures
- Commune
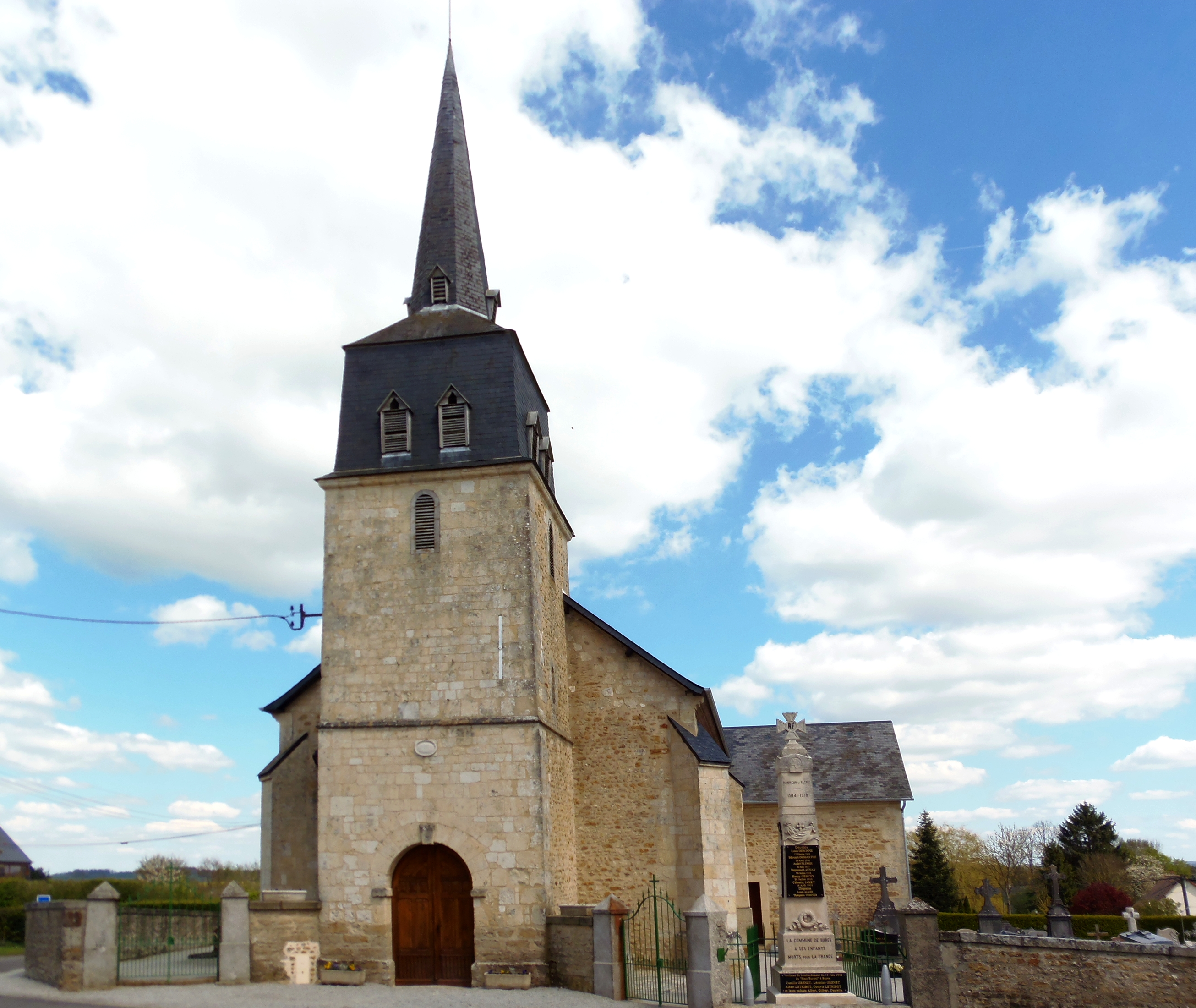
- The church in Bures
- Location of Bures
- Location within France Location within Normandy
- Coordinates: 48°33′50″N 0°24′08″E
- Country: France
- Region: Normandy
- Department: Orne
- Arrondissement: Alençon
- Canton: Écouves
- Intercommunality: Vallée de la Haute Sarthe

Government
  - Mayor (2020–2026): Jacky Brûlard
- Area^{1}: 9.64 km^{2} (3.72 sq mi)
- Elevation: 260 m (850 ft)
- Highest elevation: 216 m (709 ft)
- Lowest elevation: 154 m (505 ft)
- Population (2023): 166
  - Density: 17.2/km^{2} (44.6/sq mi)
- Time zone: UTC+01:00 (CET)
  - Summer (DST): UTC+02:00 (CEST)
- INSEE/Postal code: 61067 /61170
- ^{1} French Land Register data, which excludes lakes, ponds, glaciers > 1 km^{2} (0.386 sq mi or 247 acres) and river estuaries.

Bures (French pronunciation: [byʁ]) is a commune in the Orne department in northwestern France.

== Geography ==
The commune is made up of the following collection of villages and hamlets, La Haie, Le Haut Burard, Bures, Le Bois de Bures and La Rivière.

The commune along with another 32 communes is part of a 3,503 hectare, Natura 2000 conservation area, called the Haute vallée de la Sarthe.

The Sarthe river flows through the commune.

== Population ==
Historical population
Year	Pop.	±% p.a.
1968	187	—
1975	146	−3.47%
1982	135	−1.11%
1990	128	−0.66%
1999	146	+1.47%
2007	174	+2.22%
2012	172	−0.23%
2017	165	−0.83%
2023	166	+0.10%
Source: INSEE

== See also ==
- Communes of the Orne department
