= Kavanagh (surname) =

Kavanagh Caomhánach
- Parent house: Uí Ceinnselaig of Laigin
- Country: Ireland
- Founder: Domhnall Caomhánach; King of Leinster (1171–1175)
- Final ruler: Domhnall Spainneach; King of Leinster (1595–1632)
- Titles: King of Leinster

Kavanagh or Kavanaugh is a surname of Irish origin, Caomhánach in Irish. It is one of the few Irish surnames that does not traditionally have an Ó/O or a Mac/Mc in either English or Irish (as it is an adjectival or descriptive surname).

"Ach" is a suffix meaning "related to, having, characterised by, prone to" or "person or thing connected or involved with, belonging to, having". Caomhánach means relating to or belonging to Caomhán. The first Kavanagh (Domhnall Caomhánach) was fostered by the coarb at St. Caomhan's abbey.

It is also known as Mac Murchadha Caomhánach (an example of an Irish agnomen; see Ó Catharnaigh Sionnach or Fox of Fir Teathbha), but is often now rendered 'Caomhánach'. Rarely it is referred to as 'Ó Caomhánaigh' or 'Ní Caomhánaigh'.

== Origin and history ==
"Kavanagh" and "Kavanaugh" are anglicised variations of the Irish surname Caomhánach (Cʌoṁʌ̃nʌċ in traditional Gaelic script). The surname was first assumed by Domhnall Caomhánach (the eldest son of the 12th-century king of Leinster, Diarmait Mac Murchada) in Ireland. A considerable number of anglicised variations of Caomhánach exist, with some of the most common being: "Kavanagh", "Cavanagh", "Kavanaugh" and "Cavanaugh".

Later descendants have sometimes added an O or Mac to the name in error, likely in an ill-informed attempt to de-anglicise the name. The addition of the O and Mac appeared to change more frequently in families who had emigrated Griffith's survey noted the following between in Ireland between (1842–1854): Kavanagh (2,038), Cavanagh (434), Cavenagh (11) Kavenagh (4) O' Kavanagh (3).

The inclusion of a letter "u" in the name appears to have originated in the U.S. e.g. "Cavanaugh" and "Kavanaugh".

The surname was possibly adopted by Síl Fáelchán clansmen in preference to the earlier name MacMurrough, given the prestige associated with the dynamic junior line that seized the chiefship of the Uí Cheinnselaig tribal group in the High Middle Ages.

According to historian C. Thomas Cairney, the Kavanaghs were one of the chiefly families of the Uí Ceinnselaig who in turn were a tribe from the Dumnonii or Laigin who were the third wave of Celts to settle in Ireland during the first century BC. The Kavanaghs as one of the chiefly families of the Uí Ceinnselaig is supported by John O'Hart in his 1892 Irish Pedigrees; or, The Origin and Stem of The Irish Nation.

== Notable people surnamed Kavanagh or Kavanaugh ==
- Anthony Kavanagh (born 1969), Canadian Québécois comedian
- Art mac Art MacMurrough-Kavanagh (1357–1417), Irish king of Leinster
- Arthur MacMurrough Kavanagh (1831–1889), Irish politician from County Carlow
- Brad Kavanagh (born 1992), British actor and singer-songwriter
- Brendan Kavanagh, British pianist
- Brett Kavanaugh (born 1965), American jurist; United States Supreme Court Justice since 2018
- Brian Kavanagh (filmmaker) (born 1935), Australian writer and filmmaker
- Brian Kavanagh (Gaelic footballer), Gaelic football player
- Brian P. Kavanagh (born 1967), member of the New York State Assembly
- Bryan Kavanaugh, Irish Jacobite soldier
- Cahir Mac Art Kavanagh (died 1554), Irish magnate
- Chanel Kavanagh (born 1995), judoka from New Zealand
- Charles Kavanagh (1864–1950), British Army officer
- Chris Kavanagh (musician) (born 1964), British drummer
- Chris Kavanagh (referee), British football referee
- Daryl Kavanagh (born 1986), Irish soccer player
- Dennis Kavanagh (born 1941), British political analyst and professor of politics
- Derek Kavanagh (born 1980), Irish Gaelic football player
- Dermot McMorrough Kavanagh (1890–1958), Crown Equerry of the Royal Household of the UK 1941–55
- Donal Kavanagh (born 1950), Irish Gaelic footballer
- Edward Kavanagh (1795–1844), American politician from Maine; US representative 1831–35; governor of Maine 1843–44
- Edward J Kavanagh (1888–1960), New Zealand rugby union and cricket player
- Ernest Kavanagh (1884–1916), Irish cartoonist killed during the 1916 Easter Rising
- Fergus Kavanagh (born 1985), Irish Olympic field hockey player
- Frederick W. Kavanaugh (1871–1940), New York politician
- Gary Kavanagh (contemporary), Irish Gaelic football player
- George W. Kavanagh (1880–1914), New York assemblyman
- Gerard Kavanagh (1970?-2014), Irish member of the Kinahan crime cartel
- Gere Kavanaugh (born 1929), American designer
- Graham Kavanagh (born 1973), Irish soccer player
- Herminie Templeton Kavanagh (1861–1933), Irish-American short-story writer
- Ignacio Cervantes Kavanagh (1847–1905), Cuban pianist and composer
- Jack Kavanagh (politician) (1879–1964), Canadian-Australian communist politician
- James Kavanaugh (1928–2009), American priest, author, and poet
- James B. Kavanagh (1800–1886), Irish priest
- Jamie Kavanagh (born 1990), Irish boxer
- John Kavanagh (disambiguation), multiple people
- Joseph Malachy Kavanagh (1856–1918), Irish painter
- Julia Kavanagh (1824–1877), Irish novelist
- Karen Kavanagh, Canadian physicist
- Ken Kavanagh (1923–2019), Australian motorcycle road racer
- Ken Kavanaugh (1916–2007), American football player and coach
- Laurence Kavanagh (1764–1830), Canadian merchant, judge, and politician from Nova Scotia
- Leo Kavanagh (1894–1950), American baseball player
- Liam Kavanagh (1935–2021), Irish politician; TD for Wicklow 1969–97; former member of the European Parliament
- Linda Kavanagh (c.1957–2003), Irish politician; member of the Dublin City Council
- Mark Kavanagh (born 1997), Irish hurler
- Markella Kavenagh, Australian actress
- Martin Kavanagh (historian) (1895–1987), Canadian teacher and historian
- Martin Kavanagh (hurler) (born 1994), Irish hurler
- Marty Kavanagh (1891–1960), American baseball player
- Michael Kavanagh (born 1979), Irish hurler
- Morgan Kavanagh (c. 1799–1874), Irish poet, novelist and author of works on philology
- Niamh Kavanagh (born 1968), Irish pop singer; Eurovision Song Contest winner 1993
- P. J. Kavanagh (1931–2015), British poet and broadcaster
- Paul Kavanagh (disambiguation)
- Pat Kavanagh (agent) (1940–2008), British literary agent
- Pat Kavanagh (ice hockey) (born 1979), Canadian ice hockey player
- Patrick Kavanagh (1904–1967), Irish poet
- Patrick Kavanagh (d. 1581 AD), Irish Catholic martyr and saint.
- Patrick Kavanagh (footballer, born 1985) (born 1985), Irish soccer player
- Peter Kavanagh (Australian politician) (born 1959), Australian politician from Victoria
- Peter Kavanagh (Irish footballer) (1910–1993), Irish football player
- Peter Kavanagh (writer) (1916–2006), Irish writer and scholar; brother of the poet Patrick Kavanagh
- Richie Kavanagh (born 1949), Irish entertainer and singer
- Rory Kavanagh (born 1982), Irish Gaelic football player
- Ryan Kavanaugh (born 1974), American film producer
- Stephen Kavanagh, British retired senior police officer
- Steve Kavanagh (born 1971), Canadian figure skater and ice dancer
- Ted Kavanagh (1892–1958), British radio scriptwriter and producer
- Terry Kavanagh (contemporary), American comic book writer and editor
- Thomas Christian Kavanagh (1912–1978), American civil engineer; founding member of the National Academy of Engineering
- Thomas G. Kavanagh (1917–1997), American jurist from Michigan; justice of the Michigan Supreme Court 1969–1985
- Thomas Henry Kavanagh (1821–1882), Irish recipient of the Victoria Cross for action during the Indian Mutiny
- Thomas M. Kavanagh (1909–1975), American jurist from Michigan; justice of the Michigan Supreme Court 1958–1975
- Trevor Kavanagh (born 1943), British newspaper journalist and editor
- Walter Kavanagh (cricketer) (1814–1836), Irish cricketer
- Walter J. Kavanaugh (1933–2008), American politician from New Jersey; state legislator 1976–2008
- William Marmaduke Kavanaugh (1866–1915), American politician from Arkansas; US senator 1913

== Fictional characters ==
- Dominic Kavanagh, on the Irish soap opera Fair City
- James Kavanagh, subject of British legal drama Kavanagh QC
- Jon Kavanaugh, from the FX television series The Shield
- Katherine 'Kate' Kavanagh, from the E. L. James novel Fifty Shades of Grey
- Peter Kavanagh, on Stargate Atlantis
- Tiffany Kavanagh, in The Missing Link DLC for the video game Deus Ex: Human Revolution
- Toby Cavanaugh, from the series Pretty Little Liars
- Tracey Kavanagh, on the Irish soap opera Fair City

== See also ==
- Cavanagh
- Kings of Leinster
- Uí Ceinnselaig
- Irish clans
