= Cavanagh =

- Pronunciation: /ˈkævənɑː/ KAV-ə-nah

Origin
- Meaning: A variation of the Irish family surname Caomhánach.
- Motto: Peace and Plenty

Other names
- Variant forms: Caomhánach, Kavanagh, Kavanaugh, Cavanaugh, and more.

Cavanagh or Cavanaugh is a surname of Irish origin, a variation of the Irish family surname Caomhánach.

== Surname origin ==
Cavanagh and its variations are anglicisations of the Irish surname Caomhánach (Caoṁánaċ in traditional Gaelic type). The surname was first assumed by Domhnall, eldest son of the 12th century King of Leinster, Diarmait Mac Murchada in Ireland.

A considerable number of anglicised variations of Caomhánach exist, with some of the most common being: "Kavanagh", "Cavanagh", "Kavanaugh" and "Cavanaugh".

== Spelling variations ==
Clann Chaomhánach/Cavanagh covers the following known variations of the family name: Kavanagh, Kavanaugh, Kavanah, Kavenah, Kabana, Kavaner, Kavenaugh, Kavanacht, Kaveny, Kevane, Cavanaugh, Cavanah, Cavenah, Cavana, Cavana, Cavner, Cavenaugh, Cavender, Cavenogh, Cavnar, Cavignac, Cavanaogh, Cavanogh, Cabanah, Chaomhana, Cowand and many others...

== Cavanagh ==
List of people with the surname Cavanagh:

- Clare Cavanagh, American literary critic
- Colette Cavanagh (born 1998), Scottish footballer
- Daniel Cavanagh (born 1972), Jamie Cavanagh, and Vincent Cavanagh (born 1973), brothers in the band Anathema
- Daniel Cavanagh (bishop), Bishop of Leighlin
- Daniel Cavanagh (politician), American politician
- David Cavanagh (died 2018), Irish writer
- Dawn Cavanagh, South African women's rights activist
- Dean Cavanagh, journalist, author and screenwriter
- Diego Cavanagh (1905–1977), Argentinian Polo Player and Olympic Gold Medalist
- Frank Cavanagh, former bass player for Filter
- Hollie Cavanagh (born 1993), British singer based in the United States
- James Cavanagh (disambiguation), various people
- Jerome Cavanagh (1928–1979), American politician from Detroit, Michigan
- John Cavanagh (disambiguation), various people
- Kate Cavanagh (1951–2008), Scottish social worker
- Katy Cavanagh (born 1973), English actress
- Kit Cavanagh (died 1739), male impersonator who fought as a soldier in the 1690s
- Lucy Mary Cavanagh (1871–1936), American botanist
- Mary Cavanagh, American politician
- Megan Cavanagh (actress) (born 1960), American actress
- Michael Cavanagh (architect), Australian architect
- Michael Cavanagh (judge), American judge from Michigan
- Orfeur Cavenagh, Governor of the Straits Settlements in Singapore
- Patrick Cavanagh (died 1581), Irish Catholic martyr
- Paul Cavanagh (1888–1964), English film actor
- Peter Cavanagh (born 1981), English footballer
- Roberto Cavanagh (1914–2002), Argentinian polo player
- Sean Cavanagh (born 1983), Irish Gaelic footballer
- Terry Cavanagh (politician), Canadian politician
- Terry Cavanagh (developer), Irish video game designer
- Tim Cavanagh, comedy songwriter
- Tom Cavanagh (born 1963), Canadian actor
- Tomás Cavanagh (born 2001), Argentine footballer

== Cavanaugh ==
List of people with the surname Cavanaugh:

- Carey Cavanaugh (born 1955), former United States ambassador
- Christine Cavanaugh (1963–2014), American voice actor
- Colleen Cavanaugh (born 1953), American microbiologist
- Dan Cavanaugh (born 1980), retired American professional ice hockey player
- Dave Cavanaugh (1919–1981), American composer and musician
- Dennis M. Cavanaugh (born 1947), retired United States District Judge in the District Court of New Jersey
- Frank Cavanaugh (American football) (1876–1933)
- Hobart Cavanaugh (1886–1950), American character actor in films and on stage
- James Cavanaugh (songwriter) (1892–1967)
- James M. Cavanaugh (1823–1879), representative for Minnesota and delegate from the Territory of Montana
- Jay Cavanaugh (1949–2005), American medical cannabis activist
- Jillian Cavanaugh, American anthropologist and academic administrator
- John Cavanaugh (baseball) (1900–1961), MLB player
- John Cavanaugh (sculptor) (1921–1985)
- John J. Cavanaugh (1899–1979), American priest and president of the University of Notre Dame
- John J. Cavanaugh Jr. (born 1980), politician from Nebraska
- John Joseph Cavanaugh III (born 1945), politician from Nebraska
- John R. Cavanaugh (1929–2007), American priest and scholar, faculty member of St. John Fisher College
- Linda Cavanaugh (born 1950), retired newscaster from Oklahoma
- Machaela Cavanaugh (born 1979), politician from Nebraska
- Matt Cavanaugh (born 1956), former American football quarterback in the NFL who played from 1979 to 1991
- Michael Cavanaugh (musician) (born 1972), American actor, musician and singer
- Michael Cavanaugh (actor) (born 1942), American TV and film actor, notable for 24
- Page Cavanaugh (1922–2008), American jazz and pop pianist, vocalist, and arranger
- Patrick Cavanaugh, American television actor
- Peter Cavanaugh (1941-2021), American Radio DJ and author
- Thomas Cavanaugh, American Medal of Honor recipient
- Tim Cavanaugh, American journalist and blogger, web editor of the Los Angeles Times opinion page
- Twinkle Andress Cavanaugh (born 1966), politician from Alabama

== Fictional characters ==
- Liam and Leanna Cavanagh, characters from Emmerdale, a British soap opera.
- Jordan Cavanaugh, character from Crossing Jordan, an American television drama.
- Toby Cavanaugh, character from Pretty Little Liars, an American television drama.
- Alicia Florrick (née Cavanaugh), character from The Good Wife, an American television drama.
- Miles Cavanaugh, character from The Edge of Night, an American television soap opera.
- Sally Ann Cavanaugh, character from Fletch, an American comedy film.
- Johnny Cavanagh, character in the story The Shepherd, by Frederick Forsyth.
- The title characters from The Cavanaughs, an American television sitcom.
- James Kavanagh, the main character in Kavanagh QC, a British television drama.
- Detective Cavanaugh, a side character in iZombie, played by Robert Salvador

== See also ==
- Caomhánach, about the family origins
- Kavanagh (surname)
- Kings of Leinster
- Uí Ceinnselaig
