= Kavanagh =

Kavanagh or Kavanaugh may refer to:

== People ==
- Kavanagh (surname), including a list of persons with the name
  - Justice Kavanagh (disambiguation)
  - Brett Kavanaugh, an associate justice of the Supreme Court of the United States

== Arts, entertainment and media ==
- Kavanagh (novel), an 1849 novel by Henry Wadsworth Longfellow
- Kavanagh QC, a 1995–2001 British television series
- "Kavanaugh" (The Shield), a 2006 episode of the television series The Shield

== Places ==
- Kavanagh, Alberta, a hamlet in Canada
- Kavanagh, Iran, a village in Iran
- Kavanagh Building, an Art Deco skyscraper in Buenos Aires, Argentina
- Kavanagh College, a secondary school in Dunedin, New Zealand
- Kavanaugh Field, was a minor league baseball park in Little Rock, Arkansas

== See also ==
- Caomhánach (Gaelic language spelling of the name), a surname
- Cavanagh (disambiguation)
