= Brian Kavanagh =

Brian or Bryan Kavanagh may refer to:

- Brian P. Kavanagh (born 1967), member of the New York State Senate
- Brian Kavanagh (filmmaker) (born 1935), Australian writer and filmmaker
- Brian Kavanagh (Gaelic footballer) (born 1985), Gaelic football player

== See also ==
- Brian Cavanaugh (fl. 1980s–2000s), ice hockey coach
- Brian W. Cavanaugh (fl. 1990s–2020s), United States Marine Corps general
- Bryan Kavanaugh, (1661-1735), Irish Jacobite soldier
