= Martin Kavanagh =

Martin Kavanagh may refer to:

- Martin Kavanagh (historian) (1895–1987), teacher and historian
- Martin Kavanagh (hurler) (born 1994), Irish hurler
