= John Cavanaugh =

John Cavanaugh may refer to:

- John Cavanaugh (baseball) (1900–1961), MLB player
- John Cavanaugh (politician) (born 1980), Nebraska politician
- John Cavanaugh (sculptor) (1921–1985)
- John C. Cavanaugh, former president of the University of West Florida and current chancellor of the Pennsylvania State System of Higher Education
- John J. Cavanaugh (1899–1979), American priest and academic administrator
- John Joseph Cavanaugh III (born 1945), American politician
- John R. Cavanaugh (1929–2007), American priest, teacher and scholar
- John W. Cavanaugh (1870–1935), American priest and academic administrator

== See also ==
- John Cavanagh (disambiguation)
- John Kavanagh (disambiguation)
