= Baltinglass Abbey =

12th century abbey in County Wicklow, Ireland

- Mainistir Bhealach Conglais
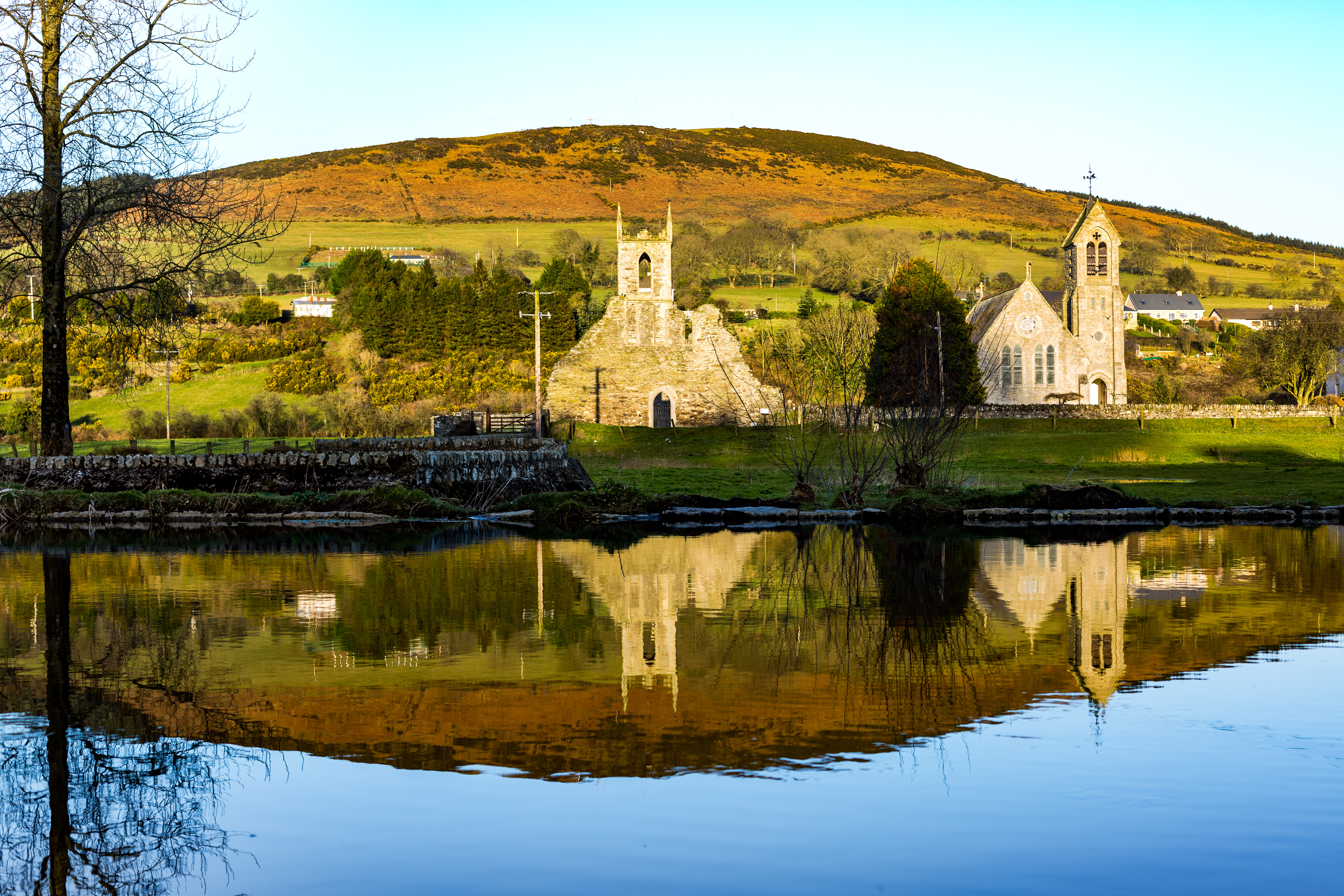
- View of Baltinglass Abbey looking across the Slaney

- Location within Ireland
- Interactive map of Baltinglass Abbey

Monastery information
- Other name: Vallis Salutis
- Order: Cistercians
- Established: 1148
- Disestablished: 1536
- Mother house: Mellifont Abbey
- Diocese: Kildare and Leighlin

People
- Founder: Diarmait Mac Murchada

Architecture
- Functional status: Ruined
- Style: Romanesque, Gothic
- Groundbreaking: 1148

Site
- Location: Church Lane, Baltinglass, County Wicklow, Ireland
- Coordinates: 52.943886°N 6.709747°W
- Public access: yes

Baltinglass Abbey (Irish: Mainistir Bhealach Conglais) is a ruined medieval Cistercian abbey in Baltinglass, County Wicklow, Ireland. Founded by Diarmait Mac Murchada in 1148, the abbey was suppressed in 1536. It is today a National Monument.

== History ==
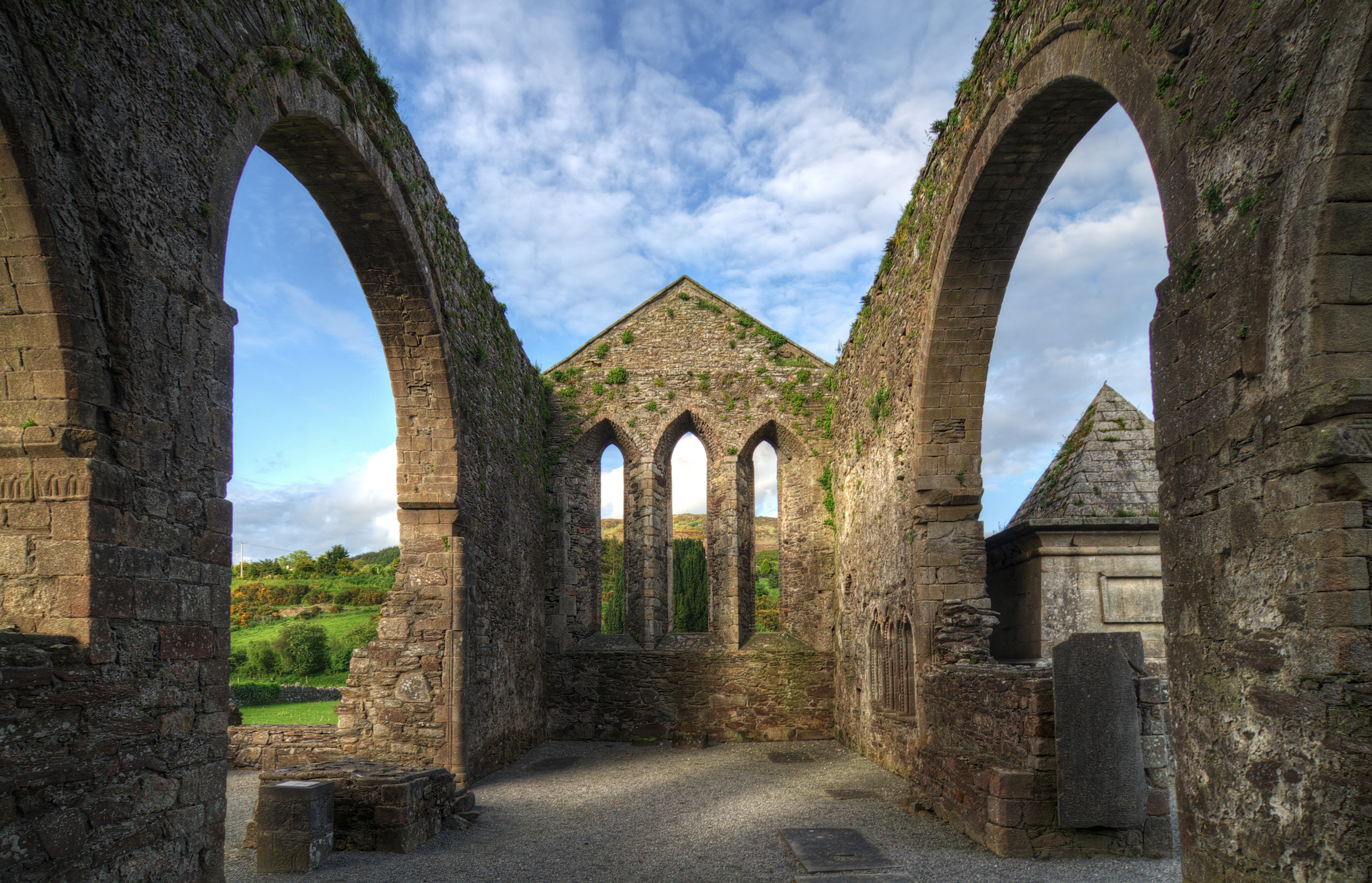
Nave of the church. The 1832 tomb of the Stratford family is visible at right.

Founded in 1148 by Diarmait Mac Murchada, the King of Leinster, Baltinglass Abbey sits beside the River Slaney in a valley of the Wicklow Mountains. The original name Belach Conglais means "pass of Cú Glas," referring to a mythological hero that was killed by wild boars. The abbey is roughly contemporary with Ferns Abbey, St Saviour's Priory, and possibly also Killeshin Church.

Baltinglass Abbey was established as a daughter house of Mellifont Abbey, a Cistercian abbey near Drogheda. Diarmait gave it the Latin name Vallis Salutis, meaning "Valley of Salvation", and granted it eight parcels of land in the region as an endowment.

Grangecon, a nearby village, was originally an out-farm of the monks. They operated a corn-mill in the area that the village now occupies.

The first stage of the building was completed by 1170, it had become the mother house of Jerpoint Abbey in about 1160, and in 1228 it is recorded that there were 36 monks and 50 lay brothers living at Baltinglass.

The Abbey was occupied for nearly 400 years until it was shut down by the 1536 Dissolution of the Monasteries and granted to Edmond Butler, 3rd/13th Baron Dunboyne. A Church of Ireland church was built within the abbey itself in 1815, but it closed in 1883.

== Architecture ==
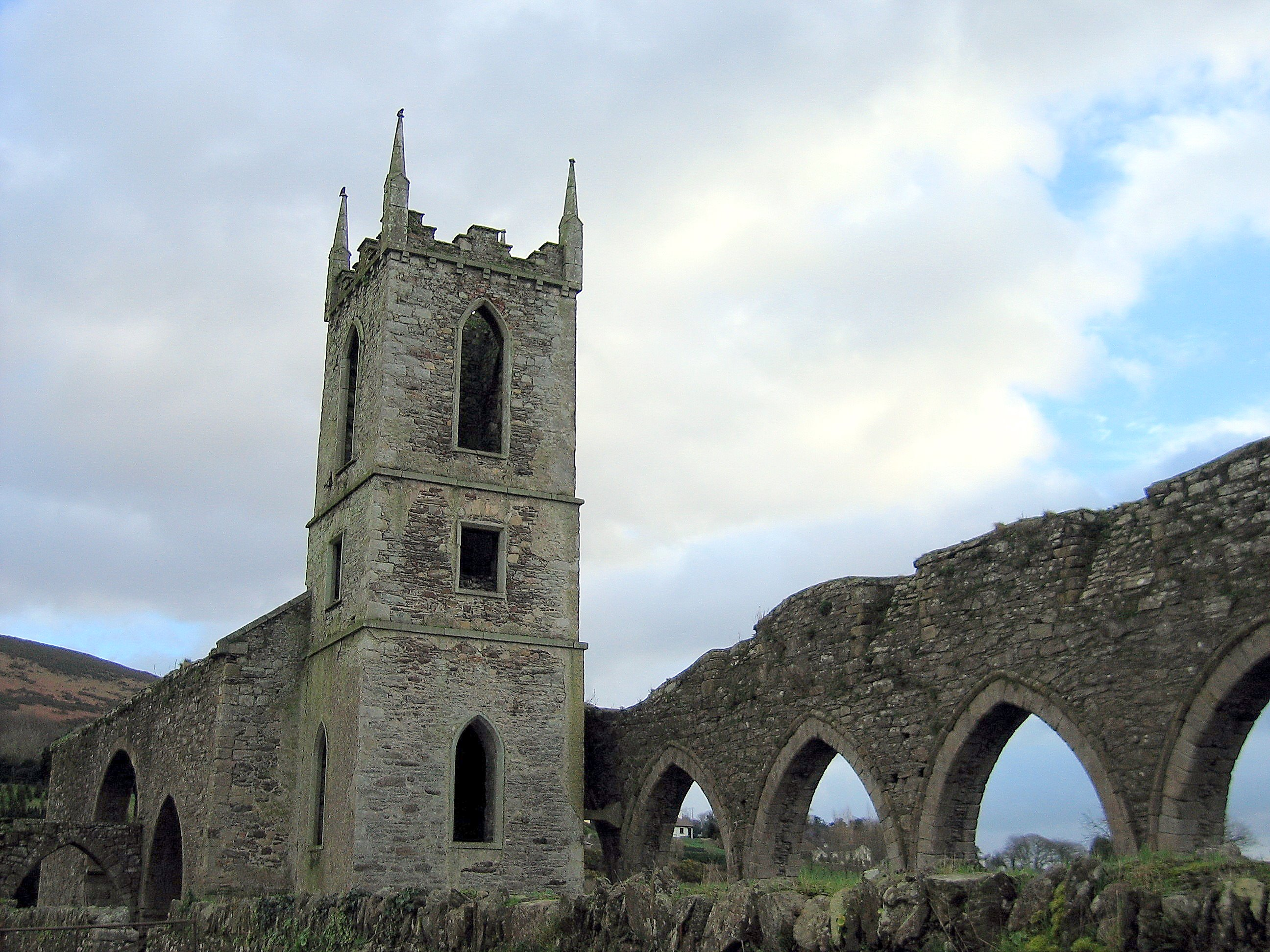
Tower and arcade

The stonework at the abbey shows carved humans and animals and is a particular Cistercian form of Romanesque architecture. The decoration on the capitals is similar to that at its daughter house Jerpoint.

The surviving church (56 m in length) and some of the cloister date from the 12th century, consisting of the nave with aisles, chancel, square presbytery with three-light window and a pair of transepts from which small chapels project. The south aisle of the church is joined to the choir by a twelfth-century doorway. Part of the original cloister, to the south of the church, has been rebuilt. The church also has 13th and 15th-century additions. The east windows and tower were built in the nineteenth century.

A glazed tile potentially depicting Saint George and the Dragon was unearthed at the abbey in 1941. At that point, it was the only tile ever found in Ireland with a human figure painted on it.

== See also ==
- List of abbeys and priories in Ireland (County Wicklow)
