= Cavanagh (disambiguation) =

Cavanagh or Cavanaugh is a surname.

Cavanagh or Cavanaugh may also refer to:

== Places ==
- Cavanagh (townland), County Cavan, Ireland
- Cavanagh, Edmonton, Canada, a neighbourhood
- Cavanaugh Flight Museum, Addison, Texas, US
- Cavanagh, Córdoba, a municipality in Marcos Juárez Department, Córdoba Province, Argentina

== Entertainment ==
- The Cavanaughs (TV series)
- The Cavanaughs (web series)

== See also ==
- Kavanagh (disambiguation)
