= Dervorgilla =

Dervorgilla, Derorugilla, Dearbhfhorghaill Derbforgaill is an Irish name, sometimes anglicised as Derval. It can refer to:

- Derbforgaill ingen Maeleachlainn (1109–1193)
- Dervorguilla of Galloway (c. 1210–1290)
