= St Saviour's Priory, Wicklow =

Ruined Augustinian priory in Wicklow, Ireland

Coordinates: 53.0079°N 6.3122°W

St Saviour's Priory
- Mainistir an tSlánaitheora
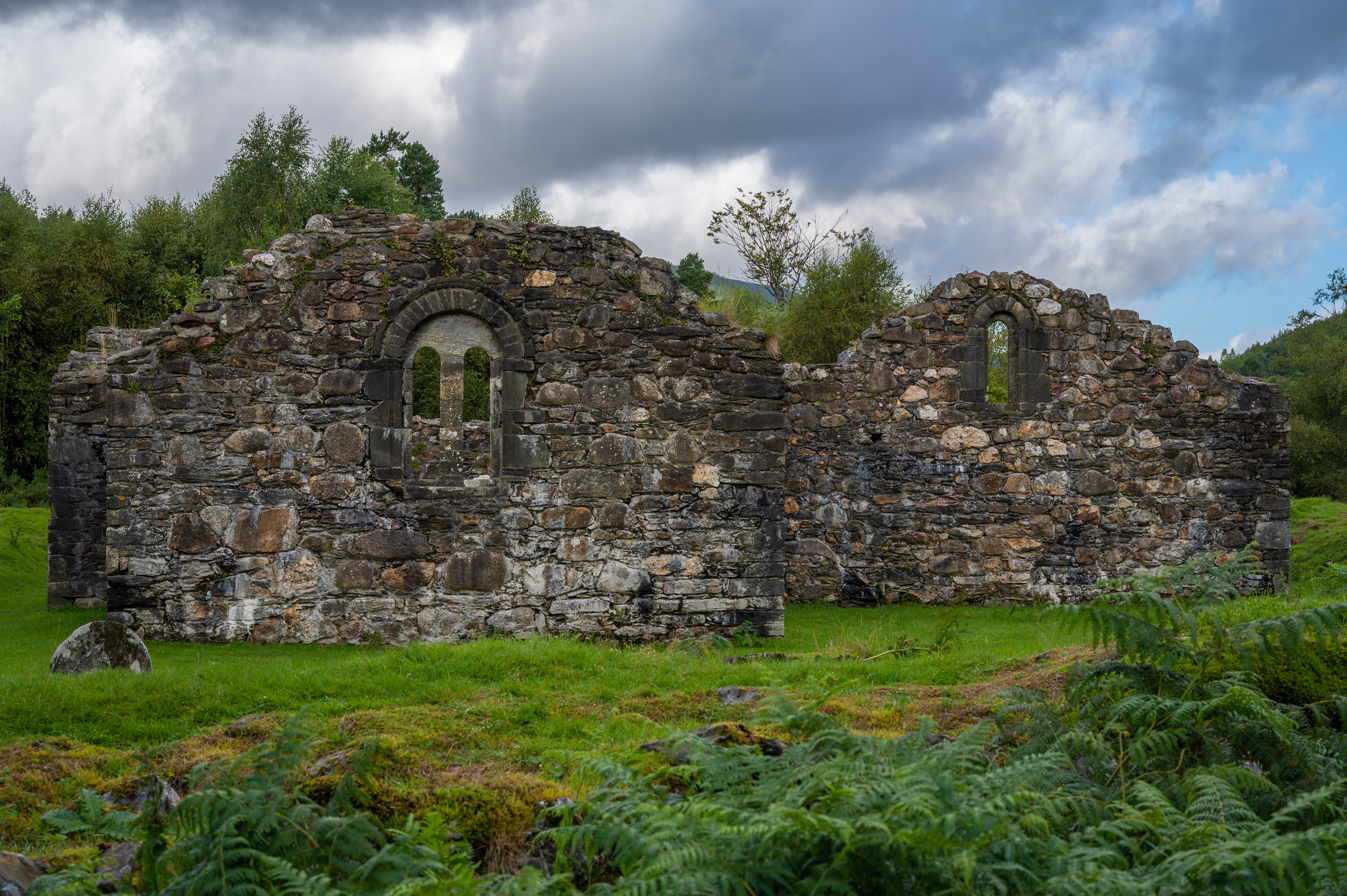

Monastery information
- Order: Augustinian

National monument of Ireland
- Official name: Glendalough
- Reference no.: 134

St Saviour's Priory (Irish: Mainistir an tSlánaitheora) is a ruined Augustinian monastery in Glendalough, County Wicklow, Ireland.

== History ==
The priory was likely founded c. 1162, which is when Lorcán Ua Tuathail, also known as St. Laurence O'Toole the founder, was made Archbishop of Dublin. Diarmait Mac Murchadha, the King of Leinster, was likely involved in the monastery's foundation. St Saviour's is roughly contemporary with Ferns Abbey, Baltinglass Abbey, and likely also Killeshin Church. It is located three quarters of a mile to the east of the city, on the South bank of the river flowing from the two lakes, on a narrow floodplain to the south-east of the core of the Glendalough monastic site. The priory's relative isolation from the rest of the campus is thought to be a result of resentment towards the Augustinians by the long-established monastic community who occupied the site.

== Architecture ==
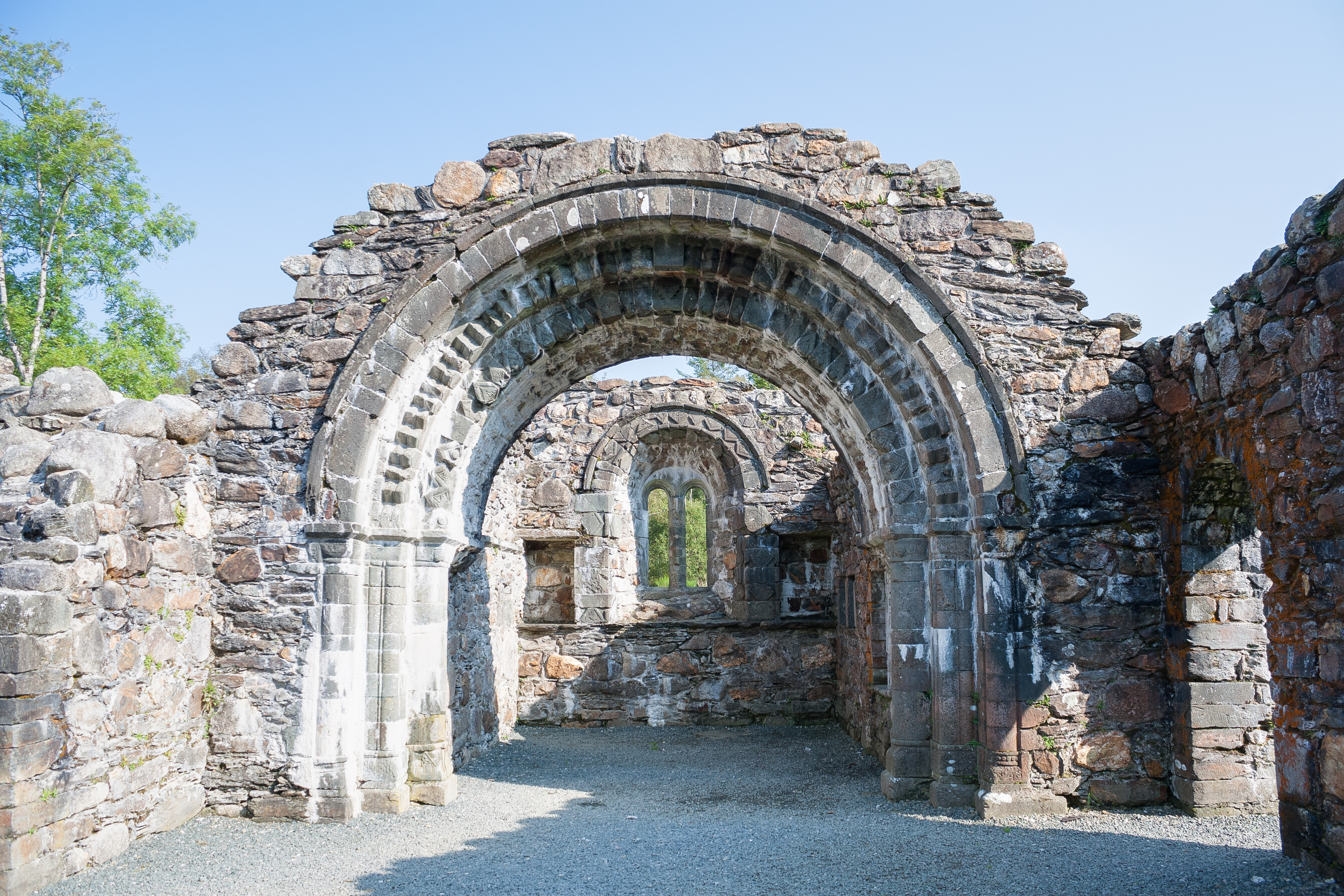
The priory choir's arch and chancel

St Saviour's monastery or priory consists of three parts, the nave, the chancel and a domestic room to the north side. The walls are very thick varying from 3'-0" to 4-0" thick. The nave is 41'-0" by 20'-6" and the chancel which originally had a stone vaulted arched roof is 17'-4" by 11'-6". The domestic room is 39'-9" long by 19'-8" wide. The structure is built in the Irish Romanesque style. The most striking feature of the priory church church is the lavishly decorated archway between the nave and the chancel. When opened up in 1875 there were two undecorated doorways on the south side of the nave. That nearest the altar had a form of external porch. there are two round headed windows on the south side of the nave, and one double light window on the east side of the chancel. The windows on the south side have an external reveal or casement which may have held a timber shutter. The doorway on the north side of the nave led to the monk's quarters. within those quarters is a mural staircase. it is not known what the purpose of the staircase is. Was it once part of a transept? Did it lead to a belfry? This domestic building has one round headed window.

Among the stone decorations to the chancel arch and columns and window and door surrounds, the following can be seen:

a) Chevrons.

b) Step patterns.

c) Spirals.

d) Floral forms.

e) Prow of a ship with mast and sails.

f) Dog-like animals.

g) Triskele.

h) Lozenge shaped compartments.

j) Human heads.

The entire building is surrounded by a broad low wall of dry stone and earth. This feature is not original, as the monastic site would originally have been much larger. this was of course a separate monastic site from that at St. Kevin's city.

== Restoration ==
At the time when the building was taken into care by the Office of Public Works in 1875, it was in poor condition with few walls in excess of 2.0m high, and it was buried under heaps of rubbish, and tangled vegetation. However, many of the original decorative stones lay where they had fallen, thus making restoration easier. it is known that many mistakes were made in the restoration.

The south group of pillars carrying the chancel arch was intact in 1875, so it did not require rebuilding.

Some excavation occurred in the church in 1912.
