= Jack Kavanagh =

Jack Kavanagh may refer to:

- Jack Kavanagh (hurler) (born 1988), Irish hurler
- Jack Kavanagh (politician), (1879–1964) Canadian-born Australian communist politician
- Jack Kavanagh (runner), British long-distance runner

== See also ==
- John Kavanagh (disambiguation)
- John Cavanagh (disambiguation)
