= Caomhánach =

Irish-language surname

Clan Caomhánach Caoṁánaċ
- Parent house: Uí Ceinnselaig of Laigin
- Country: Ireland
- Founder: Domhnall Caomhánach; King of Leinster (1171–1175)
- Current head: Cathal Cavanagh; Inaugurated 12 September 2012
- Final ruler: Domhnall Spainneach; King of Leinster (1595–1632)
- Titles: King of Leinster

Caomhánach (Irish: Irish pronunciation: ['kiːwaːnˠəx]; Caoṁánaċ in Gaelic type) is an Irish-language surname first assumed by Domhnall Caomhánach, eldest son of the 12th-century Diarmait Mac Murchada, king of Leinster (now Leinster, Ireland). A considerable number of anglicised variations of Caomhánach exist; some of the most common are Kavanagh, Cavanagh, Kavanaugh and Cavanaugh.

== Early history – Kings of Leinster ==
The Caomhánach family is a branch of the Mac Murchada dynasty and is descended from Domhnall Caomhánach, eldest son of Diarmait, king of Leinster.

The dynasty the family descend from was known as Uí Ceinnselaig, whose territory included nearly all of County Carlow and County Wexford, with parts of Counties Wicklow and Kilkenny included. The Caomhánach family maintained control of the kingship of Leinster up until the 17th century. This claim was at times disputed and resulted in nearly consistent clashes with Anglo-Norman settlers in Ireland. The lion passant on the Caomhánach arms is a classic heraldic device associated with feudal power but unusual for a family of Gaelic extraction; it may be that it is intended to signify the centuries-long connection of the family with the kingship of Leinster.

=== 12th century – Origin and meaning of the name ===
It is referenced in a translation of the historical Annals of the Four Masters by John O'Donovan that Domhnall Caomhánach was fostered for his training and education at the monastery of Saint Cóemgen/Kevin at Kilcavan in the Barony of Gorey, County Wexford. According to Irish custom, it was because of this that Domhnall assumed the name Caomhánach in the form of a descriptive byname meaning "a student or follower of Cóemgen". Contrary to usual Irish practice, the name was adopted by his descendants as an inherited surname.

In several Irish dictionaries, Caomhánach is defined as "a friend, companion" and "merciful". however some historians believe that is incorrect and could be specific to the O' Caemhin families of North Connacht who derive it from Caomhán Mac Connmhach. Caomh (also caemh or cóem in old Irish) means words such as friend, companion, smooth, noble, aristocrat. fair, handsome or beautiful. Caomhán or Cóemgen (Kevin) is the diminutive of Caomh. Án is used to indicate something or someone is small, or to denote affection. It can also be ironic and denote the opposite e.g. bolgadan (little belly) was used to indicate a man with a big belly. Adding the ach to Caomhán means that it relates to or is "of" Caomhán.

=== 14th century – Art Óg mac Murchadha Caomhánach ===
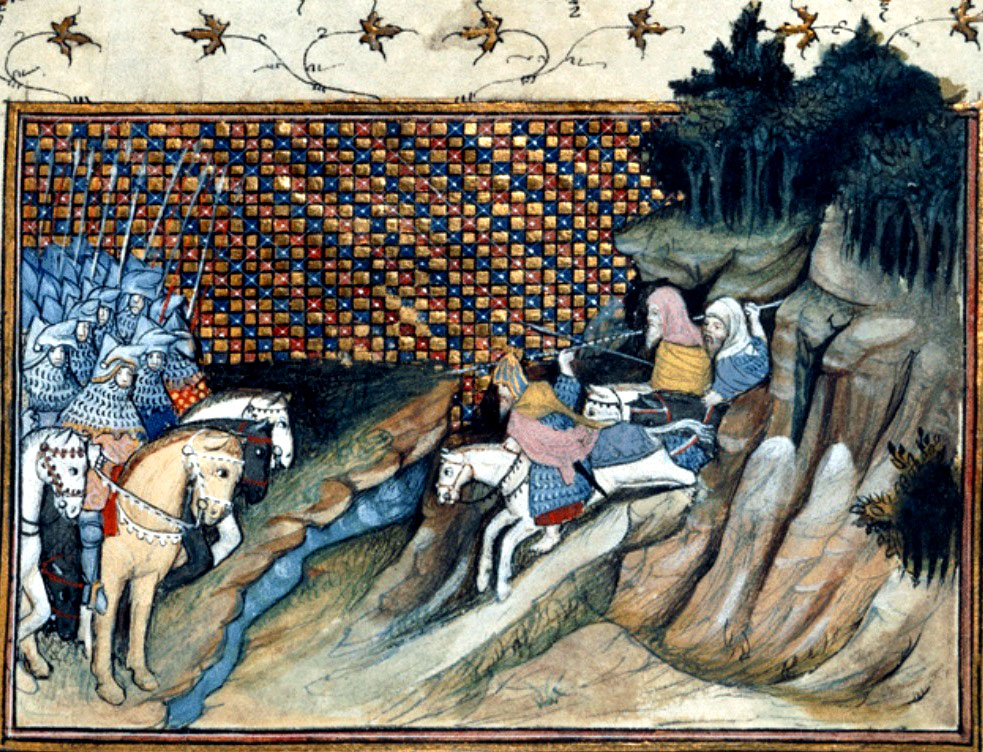
Art Mór riding to meet the earl of Gloucester, as depicted in an illustration to Jean Creton's Histoire du roy d'Angleterre Richard II

Art Óg mac Murchadha Caomhánach is generally regarded as the most formidable of the later Kings of Leinster. Throughout the course of his reign, Art managed to reclaim control over much of the kingdom of Leinster. He drove the descendants of the Anglo-Norman settlers out of north Wexford and coastal Wicklow and threatened the Anglo-Irish towns of Wexford, Carlow and Dublin. The territory of the Caomhánachs at this period was huge and became known as "the Kavanagh's country" and with good reason: Art held complete control over it, reigning for forty-two years, and even receiving dues from the English crown, the "black rent" as it was known.

Art became such a threat to the English interest in Ireland that Richard II of England made two expeditions to Ireland to bring him into submission, the latter ultimately costing Richard II his throne as he was captured and murdered upon his return to England. Art remained at large as king of Leinster until 1416 or 1417, when he was poisoned in New Ross. Although Domhnall Caomhánach was the first bearer of the name, in fact the majority of the septs that proliferated from the fifteenth century on descend from Art.

=== 17th century – Nine Years' War ===
In the 16th century, Cahir mac Art Kavanagh took part in the Desmond Rebellions. Art Kavanagh, a companion of Hugh O'Neill's took part in the dramatic escape from Dublin Castle in 1590. The chiefs of the family continued to take the ruling title mac Murchadha, but by the mid-sixteenth century their power was on the wane, and was decisively broken by the start of the seventeenth century. The last king of Leinster was Domhnall Spainneach Mac Murrough Caomhanach, who finally submitted at the end of the Nine Years' War in 1603.

Despite the family's loss of power and property, the line of descent from the last duly inaugurated Chief of the Name, Brian Kavanagh, The Mac Murchadha, remained unbroken down to recent times. It is not surprising, then, that Caomhánachs were prominent among the great wave of native Irish aristocrats emigrating to Europe in the wake of the final defeat of Gaelic Ireland at the end of the seventeenth century, becoming officers in the armies of Catholic France, Spain and Austria.

In the 17th century Brian Kavanagh fought for the House of Stuart in Scotland and was described as the tallest man in King James' army. Charles Kavanagh rose to be the military Governor of Prague in 1766. Several Caomhánachs were officers in the Irish Brigade in the Jacobin army of France and a branch of the family settled in that country. Caomhánachs also rose to high rank in the empire of Austria-Hungary.

== Clann Caomhánach ==
Clann Caomhánach is registered with the Clans of Ireland, the Irish Government agency set up to co-ordinate the activities of all Irish Clans.

== Variations of the name ==
Clann Chaomhánach covers the following known variations of the family name—Kavanagh, Cavanough, Kavanaugh, Kavanah, Kavenah, Kabana, Kavaner, Kavenaugh, Kavenagh, Kavanacht, Kaveny, Cavanagh, Cavanaugh, Cavanah, Cavenah, Cavenagh, Cavany, Cavani, Kavana, Cavana, Cavner, Cavenaugh, Cavender, Cavenogh, Cavnar, Cavignac, Cavaignac, Cavanaogh, Cavanogh, Cabanah, Chaomhanach—but there are many others.

== See also ==
- Kavanagh (surname)
- Cavanagh
- Kings of Leinster
