= McMorrow =

McMorrow is an Irish surname, derived from the Gaelic mac Murchada. Notable people with the surname include:

- Aengus McMorrow (born 1927), Irish rugby union player
- Gerald McMorrow (born 1970), British director and writer of the short film Thespian X (2002)
- James Vincent McMorrow (born 1983), Irish folk musician
- John P. McMorrow (1926–2008), American politician
- Judith A. McMorrow (born 1955), American legal scholar
- Liam McMorrow (born 1987), Canadian professional basketball player
- Mallory McMorrow (born 1986), American politician
- Mary Ann McMorrow (1930–2013), Illinois Supreme Court justice
- Melissa McMorrow (born 1981), American boxer
- Michael McMorrow (born 1963), American musician, composer, and producer, and founding member of jam band Stolen Ogre
- Scott McMorrow, American playwright and actor
- Sean McMorrow (born 1982), Canadian ice hockey winger
- William J. McMorrow, American businessman
