= Paul Kavanagh =

Paul Kavanagh or Cavana(u)gh may refer to:

- Paul Kavanagh (politician) (died 2022), Irish businessman and politician
- Paul Kavanagh (visual effects artist), British visual effects artist
- Paul Kavanagh (criminal) (died 2015), Irish criminal who was shot dead
- Lawrence Block (born 1938), author who occasionally used the pen name Paul Kavanagh
- Paul Cavanagh (1888–1964), English actor
- Paul Cavanaugh, ice hockey player in 1999 Metro Atlantic Athletic Conference Men's Ice Hockey Tournament
