= James Mulvey (criminal) =

Convicted drug smuggler from Solihull

James Mulvey is an illicit drug smuggler originally from Solihull.

== Smuggling operation ==
The gang smuggled illicit drugs inside hollow industrial rollers on truck from Belgium, through England to the Republic of Ireland. The investigation began when a Belgian warehouse worker noticed that the same rollers kept returning to the depot. Once the connection to England was found, Belgian police notified their counterparts there. In 2007 rollers were seized by Gardaí seized the rollers on an industrial estate in Dublin. Several people were arrested and jailed but Mulvey moved to Spain shortly before arrests.

== On the run ==
To evade law enforcement, James Mulvey rarely stayed in the same place for long. He used hotels for several years, paid in cash and used burner phones. He also didn't use bank accounts.

In 2012 his father fell ill and Mulvey returned to the UK.

== Arrest ==
He was arrested in Kaunas in 2017 by Lithuanian special forces after being tracked there by the National Crime Agency.

During his trial evidence from nine countries and two ex-girlfriends were offered in evidence.

In June 2018 he was jailed for his part in an attempt to smuggle £68 million of cocaine and cannabis into the UK between 2006 and 2007.

He was jailed for 32 years.

== Family ==
His cousin Gerard "Hatchet" Kavanagh was also one of his business partners.

In June 2018 British police were searching for €7.5 million of missing money out of €77 million.
