= Tigernán Ua Ruairc =

Irish king

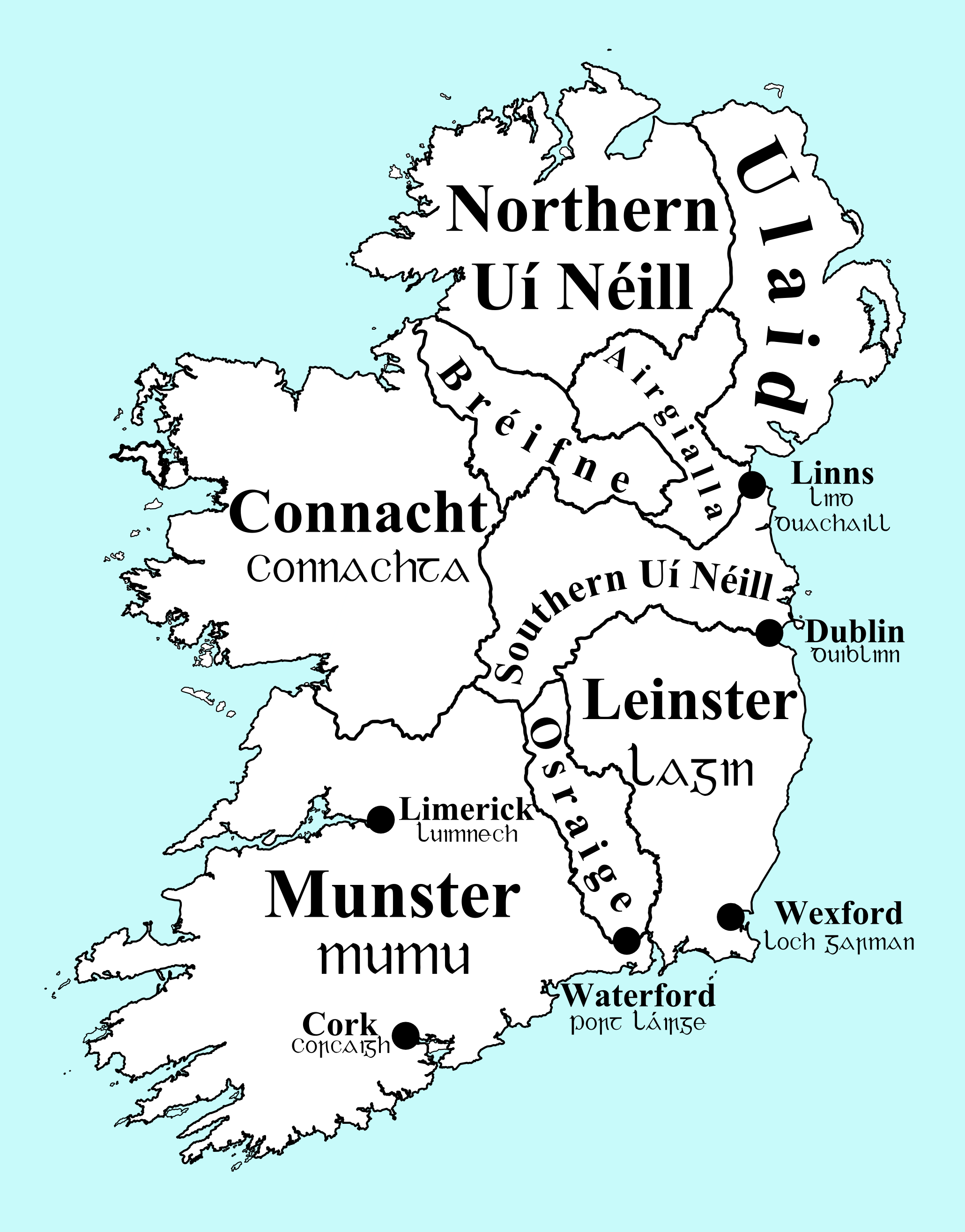

Tighearnán Mór Ua Ruairc (older spelling: Tigernán Mór Ua Ruairc), anglicised as Tiernan O'Rourke (fl. 1124–1172) ruled the kingdom of Breifne as the 19th king in its Ua Ruairc (later O'Rourke) dynasty (964–1605 CE), a branch of the Uí Briúin. As one of the provincial kings in Ireland in the twelfth century, he constantly expanded his kingdom through shifting alliances, of which the most long-standing was with Toirdelbach Ua Conchobair King of Connacht and High King of Ireland, and subsequently his son and successor Ruaidhrí Ua Conchobair. He is known for his role in the expulsion of Diarmait Mac Murchada, King of Leinster, from Ireland in 1166. Mac Murchada's subsequent recruitment of Marcher Lords to assist him in the recovery of his Kingdom of Leinster ultimately led to the Anglo-Norman invasion of Ireland.

== Early career ==
Ua Ruairc may have ruled Bréifne as early as 1124, as indicated in Mac Carthaigh's Book and the Annals of the Four Masters, the former indicating he allied at the time with the kings of Meath and Leinster against Toirdelbach Ua Conchobair. However the Annals of Ulster and the Annals of Tigernach do not mention him until 1128, where they record his robbing and killing of some of the Archbishop of Armagh's company, the former calling it 'A detestable and unprecedented deed of evil consequence'.

He appears to have carried out a number of raids into other territories in 1130s and in 1143 assisted Toirdelbach Ua Conchobair in the capture of his son Ruaidhrí. In 1144 he was given half of East Meath, with the other half going to Diarmait Mac Murchada, king of Leinster, by Ua Choncobair. Both Ua Ruairc and Mac Murchadh joined the High King in a raid into Munster in 1151.

== Abduction of Derbforgaill and Norman Invasion of Ireland ==
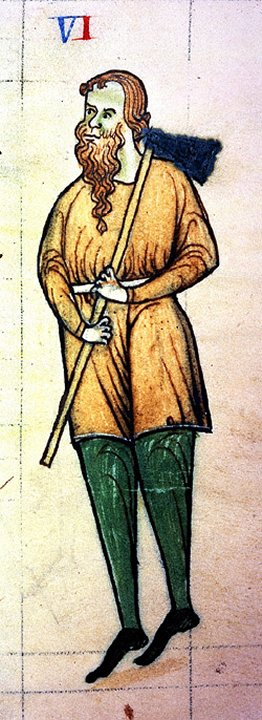
Diarmaid Mac Murrough as depicted in the Expugnatio Hibernica, ca. 1189

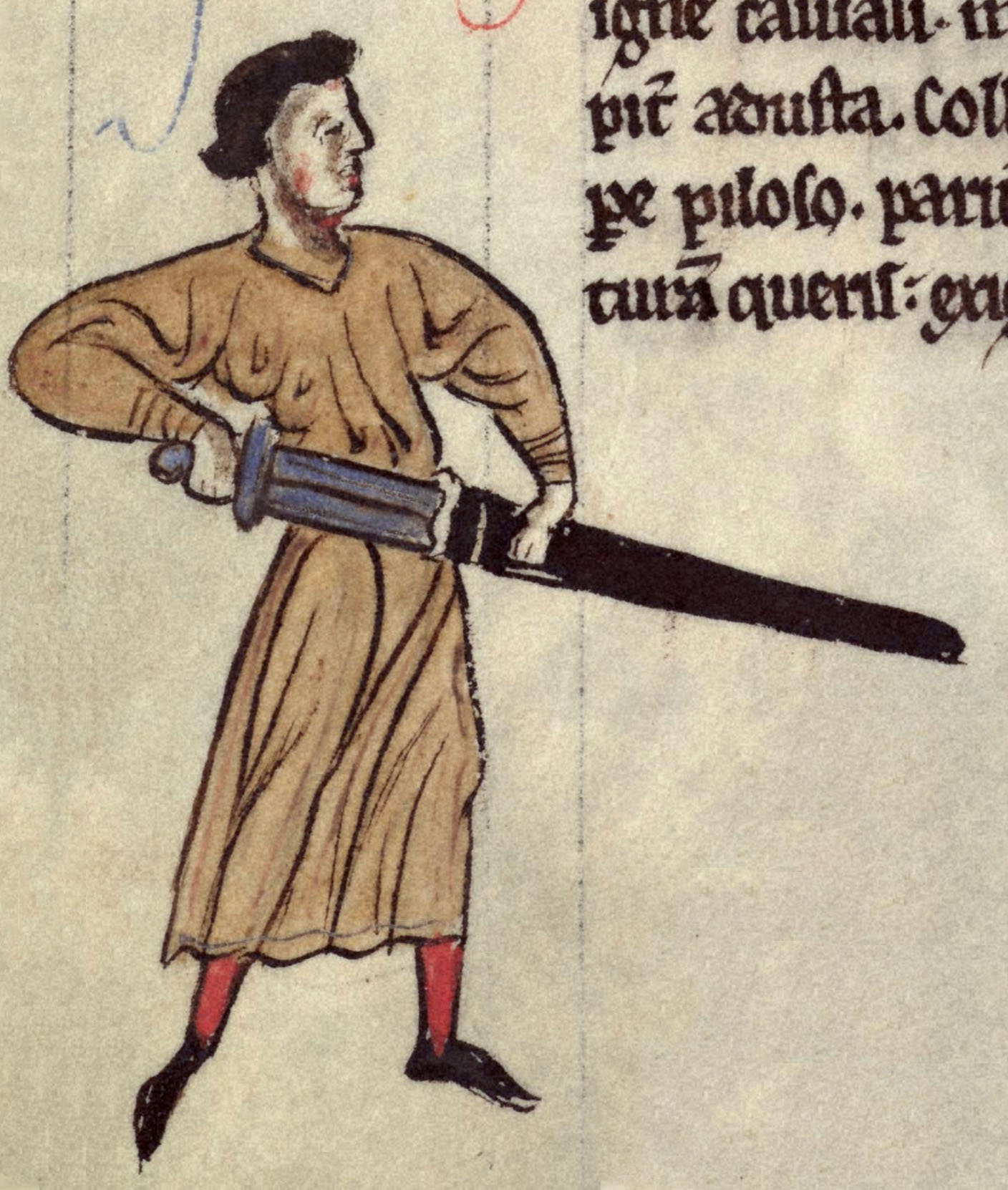
Hugh De Lacy by Gerald of Wales.

In 1152, Ua Ruairc's wife, Derbforgaill, was abducted along with her cattle and material wealth by Mac Murchada, who made a hosting into Ua Ruairc's territory aided by Toirdelbach Ua Conchobair. Although the Annals of the Four Masters state that Derbforgaill returned to Ua Ruairc the following year, the matter may not have ended there. In 1166, Mac Murchada was driven from Leinster by Ua Ruairc, Ruaidhrí Ua Conchobair, who had succeeded his father as king of Connacht and High King of Ireland, and Diarmait Ua Mealseachlainn, King of Meath. Despite the fourteen-year gap between Derbforgaill's abduction and Mac Murchada's expulsion from Leinster, several sources attribute Ua Ruairc's role in Mac Murchada's expulsion to a desire for revenge for the kidknapping of Derbforgaill.

Mac Murchadh fled to the court of Henry II of England in Aquitaine, where he asked Henry for help in regaining his territory in Leinster. Henry agreed to allow Mac Murchada to recruit mercenary soldiers from amongst his subjects. He ultimately persuaded Richard de Clare, 2nd Earl of Pembroke, known as Strongbow, to assist him, promising the inheritance of Leinster in return. He initially returned to Leinster in 1167 with a small band of Norman knights and was defeated by Ruaidhrí Ua Conchobair, Ua Ruairc and Ua Maelseachlainn. On this occasion he was allowed to remain in Ireland, but was forced to pay one hundred ounces of gold to Ua Ruairc for the kidnapping of Derbforgaill (thus proving under Brehon law that the abduction of his wife was unlawful) and submit and give hostages to Ruaidhrí. It wasn't until the arrival of Robert Fitz Stephen, Hervey de Montmorency, Raymond le Gros and eventually Strongbow himself that Mac Murchada met with success.

Ua Ruairc had his territories in Meath plundered by Mac Murchada and Strongbow in 1170. In response, the Annals of Tigernach state that he persuaded Ruaidhrí Ua Conchobair to execute hostages he had taken from Mac Murchada the previous year. In 1171 he joined Ruaidhrí in an unsuccessful siege of Dublin, which had by then been captured by Mac Murchada and Strongbow. He raided the territory around Dublin later in the year, unsuccessfully engaging the Normans stationed there under Miles De Cogan. In this engagement, his son, Aodh, was killed.

According to Giraldus Cambrensis, Ua Ruairc was one of the Kings of Ireland who submitted allegiance to Henry II after his arrival to assert control over Strongbow in 1171.It is most likely though that history in this instance is told by those that have perhaps paid the historian.

== Death ==
According to Giraldus Cambrensis, Ua Ruairc was killed at a parley on the Hill of Tlachtga by a Cambro-Norman knight named Griffin FitzWilliam, acting in defence of Hugh de Lacy and Maurice FitzGerald, whom Giraldus claims Ua Ruairc attempted to kill after failed negotiations. This occurred shortly after the departure of Henry II from Ireland. However, the Annals of Tigernach indicate that he was betrayed and killed by Eoan Mer, Richard de Clare the Younger, a son of Strongbow, and Domhnall, a son of Annach Ua Ruairc in 1172. The Annals of the Four Masters, which claims that his death was at the hands of de Lacy and Domhnall states that he was 'a man of great power for a long time'. Prior to his departure, Henry, in his capacity as Lord of Ireland, granted the Lordship of Meath to de Lacy in 1172.

== Family ==
Via his mother, Ua Ruairc was a half-brother of Donnchad Ua Cerbaill (d. 1168).

Ua Ruairc had at least three children, a son Maelseachlainn Ua Ruairc, who was killed in 1162, a son Aodh Ua Ruairc, who was killed attacking Dublin, and a daughter Dubhchoblaigh, who was married to Ruaidhrí Ua Conchobair.

== See also ==
- Irish nobility
- Irish royal families
- Kingdom of Breifne
- Kingdom of Mide
