= Jillian Cavanaugh =

American anthropologist

Jillian R. Cavanaugh is an American anthropologist and academic administrator. She is a professor and associate dean of anthropology at Brooklyn College. Cavanaugh is the president-elect of the Society for Linguistic Anthropology.

Cavanaugh was raised in Colorado. She earned her A.B. as an independent major in sociolinguistics from Vassar College in 1993. She completed a M.A. (1997) and Ph.D. (2003) in anthropology at New York University.
