= Derbforgaill ingen Maeleachlainn =

Irish princess

Dearbhfhorghaill (older spelling: Derbforgaill) (1108–1193), anglicised as Derval, was a daughter of Murchad Ua Maeleachlainn, king of Meath, and of his wife Mor (died 1137), daughter of Muirchertach Ua Briain. She is famously known as the "Helen of Ireland" as her abduction from her husband Tigernán Ua Ruairc by Diarmait Mac Murchada, king of Leinster, in 1152 played some part in bringing the Anglo-Normans to Irish shores, although this is a role that has often been greatly exaggerated and often misinterpreted.

Unusually for a woman of her time, she is mentioned no fewer than five times in contemporary annals: her abduction by Diarmait in 1152 (Annals of Clonmacnoise), (although by the end of the next year she had left Leinster and returned to her family's lands in Meath, possibly after negotiations with her father's family); her donation to the Cistercian abbey of Mellifont of altar cloths, a gold chalice, and 60 ounces of gold during the consecration ceremony in 1157 (Annals of the Four Masters); her completion of the Nuns' Church at Clonmacnoise in 1167 (Annals of the Four Masters); her retirement to Clonmacnoise in 1186 (Annals of Ulster, Annals of Loch Ce); and her death in Clonmacnoise in 1193 (Annals of Ulster, Annals of the Four Masters). As the Annals of Tigernach are attested to being composed contemporary to Dearbhforghaill's time, the fragmentary nature of the older texts is supplanted by newer transcription (as Leinster, Ulster, Connacht, and more fill these gaps).

Tigernán Ua Ruairc had three children, Melaghlin (died 1162), Aed, described as crown prince of Breifne, killed by the Anglo-Normans (died 1171) and Dowchawley (died 1171), wife to Ruaidri Ua Conchobair, high king of Ireland, but whether or not Derbforgaill was their mother is less certain.

== Abduction and the English Invasion of Ireland ==
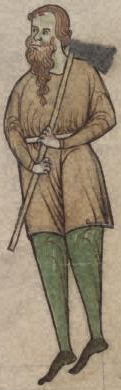
Diarmait Mac Murchada, King of Leinster from folio 56r of National Library of Ireland MS 700 (Expugnatio Hibernica)

Derbforgaill is chiefly remembered for her abduction by Diarmait Mac Murchada, king of Laigin (Leinster) in 1152, a supposed catalyst for the late twelfth-century Anglo-Norman invasion of Ireland. Her abduction occurred within the context of a joint military effort against her husband by Tairdelbach Ua Conchobair (king of Ireland) and Mac Murchada. The surviving Irish annalistic accounts differ from one another in some of their details, but more significantly they stand apart from later Anglo-Norman sources in that they do not compress the events of the 1150s and 1160s to create a sense that Derbforgaill's abduction played a direct and immediate part in Mac Murchada's banishment and his subsequent enlisting English help.

=== Irish annalistic accounts ===
Of the existing accounts of her abduction, that of the Annals of Tigernach is probably the only one which is contemporaneous to the event:

A hosting by Toirdhealbhach Ó Conchobhair and Diarmaid Mac Murchadha against Tighearnán Ó Ruairc, and they burned Bun Cuilinn and inflicted a defeat on Tighearnán, and made the son of Giolla Bruide Ó Ruairc king of Conmaicne, and he got the lordship of them all. And Diarmaid mac Murchadh, king of Leinster, forcibly carried off out of Meath the wife of Ó Ruairc, that is, Derbhfhorgaill, daughter of Murchadh, with her wealth.

The same source claims that she fled Mac Murchada within a year. The next most reliable account is that found within the seventeenth-century Annals of the Four Masters, who report that:

An army was led by Mac Lochlainn into Meath, as far as Rath-Ceannaigh, to meet the men of Ireland; and Toirdhealbhach proceeded into Meath, to meet Ua Lochlainn and Diarmaid Mac Murchadha, King of Leinster. They divided Meath into two parts on this occasion; they gave from Cluain-Iraird westwards to Murchadh Ua Maeleachlainn, and East Meath to his son, Maeleachlainn. They took Conmhaicne from Tighearnan Ua Ruairc, after having defeated him; and they burned the town named Bun-cuilinn, and gave the chieftainship to the son of Gillabraide Ua Ruairc, and their hostages were given up to Toirdhealbhach Ua Conchobhair. On this occasion Dearbhforgaill, daughter of Murchadh Ua Maeleachlainn, and wife of Tighearnan Ua Ruairc, was brought away by the King of Leinster, i.e. Diarmaid, with her cattle and furniture; and he took with her according to the advice of her brother, Maeleachlainn. There arose then a war between the Ui-Briuin and the men of Meath.

The Annals of the Four Masters are clearly relying on multiple sources at this point, as the return of Derbforgaill from Laigin in 1153 is recorded twice. Firstly as a result of being carried away by force by Tairdelbach Ua Conchobair and returned to her male kinsmen (and not her husband), and noted a second time in a manner similar to that of the Annals of Tigernach (in which she returned to Ua Ruairc of her own accord). The description in the seventeenth-century Annals of Clonmacnoise is quite close to that of the Annals of the Four Masters, although more lurid and it is the only Irish annalistic source to offer a moral judgement on Mac Murchada, while simultaneously apportioning blame on Ua Ruairc:

Dermott m^{c}Murrogh king of Leinster tooke the lady Dervorgill, daughter of the said Morrogh o’Melaghlin, and wife of Tyernan o’Royrck, with her cattle with him, and kept her for a long space to satisfie his insatiable, carnall and adulterous lust, shee was procured and enduced thereunto by her unadvised brother Melaghlin for some abuses of her husband Tyernan don before.

Of the remaining accounts in the Irish annals, Mac Carthaigh’s Book appears to have been written after the invasion and appears to follow English accounts, while the Annals of Boyle’s curt entry adds no extra detail.

=== Early English accounts ===
The two earliest English accounts to deal with Derbforgaill’s abduction are Gerald of Wales’ Expugnatio Hibernica (‘Conquest of Ireland’) and the anonymous Anglo-Norman French poem commonly known by the modern title The Song of Dermot and the Earl.

The Song of Dermot and the Earl and the Expugnatio Hibernica follow the same pattern, portraying Derbforgaill's abduction in 1152 and Mac Murchada's banishment in 1166 as occurring at the same time. The Song claims that Derbforgaill had fallen in love with Diarmait, who in turn only made a pretense of loving her, in an effort to entice her away from Ua Ruairc, as a means of avenging previous wrongs inflicted by Leth Cuinn (the northern half of Ireland) upon Leth Moga (the southern half of Ireland). She subsequently arranged for a rendezvous from which he could carry her back to Laigin unchallenged. Ua Ruairc is then said to have complained to the (unnamed) king of Connacht, who convinced Mac Murchada's allies to abandon him and force him into exile. In the events as narrated by the Song (and to a degree the Annals of Clonmacnoise and the Annals of the Four Masters) Derbforgaill is clearly a dupe, but in Gerald of Wales's Expugnatio Hibernica she becomes more blameworthy:

On an occasion when Ua Ruairc king of Meath had gone off on an expedition to far distant parts, his wife, Ua Máelechlainn's daughter, whom he had left on an island in Meath, was abducted by the aforesaid Diramait, who had long been burning with love for her and took advantage of her husband's absence. No doubt she was abducted because she wanted to be and, since 'woman is always a fickle and inconstant creature', she herself arranged that she should become the kidnapper's prize.

Almost all the world's most notable catastrophes have been caused by women, witness Mark Antony and Troy. King Ua Ruairc was stirred to extreme anger on two counts, of which however the disgrace, rather than the loss of his wife, grieved him more deeply, and he vented all the venom of his fury with a view to revenge. And so he called together and mustered his own forces and those of neighbouring peoples, and roused to the same purpose Ruaidrí, prince of Connacht and at that time supreme ruler of all Ireland. The men of Leinster, seeing that their prince was now in a difficult position and surrounded on all sides by his enemies' forces, sought to pay him back, and recalled to mind injustices which they had long concealed and stored deep in their hearts.. They made common cause with his enemies, and the men of rank among this people deserted Mac Murchada along with his good fortune... he finally trusted his life to the sea in flight, and so to speak had recourse to this last hope of saving himself.

In addition to the classical references to Mark Antony and Troy, the quotation used by Gerald is from Mercury's pushing Aeneis to leave Dido and fulfill his fate by sailing to Italy, in the Aeneid.

The abduction episode of 1152 has been variously interpreted. It seems that Derbforgaill went willingly, and that she took her cattle and chattels with her, all at the persuasion of her younger brother Maeleachlainn. It has been suggested that this was an attempt on the part of her paternal family, the royal family of Meath, to forge a new alliance through marriage, with Diarmait Mac Murchada. Formalising treaties through marriage seems to have been standard practice in twelfth-century Ireland, witness Diarmait Mac Murchada's betrothal of his daughter Aoife to Strongbow, while in 1165 the king of Uladh's daughter was taken hostage by the high king presumably just to prevent her father from using her to cement a new alliance.

Most historians are agreed that there was no romance involved, and that dynastic politics were at the base of the dispute. However, it does seem that Tigernán held the grudge, insisting on claiming legal compensation of 100 ounces of gold from Diarmait in 1167, which was enforced by Ruaidri Ua Conchobair.

== Sources ==
- Annals of Clonmacnoise, translated by Connell MacGeoghegan (1627), ed. Denis Murphy (1896). The Annals of Clonmacnoise. Dublin: Royal Society of Antiquaries of Ireland. s.a. 1152, 1167.
- Flanagan, Marie-Therese, Irish Society, Anglo-Norman Settlers, Angevin Kingship, Oxford, 1989.
- Ni Ghradaigh, Jenifer, ' 'But what exactly did she give?' Derbforgaill and the Nuns' Church', in Clonmacnoise Studies II, ed. H. King, Dublin, 2003, pp. 175–207.
