= John Cavanagh =

John Cavanagh may refer to:

- John Cavanagh (archer) (born 1956), British Paralympian
- John Cavanagh (designer) (1914–2003), London-based Irish fashion designer
- John Cavanagh (economist) (born 1955), Director of the Institute for Policy Studies in Washington, D.C., 1998–2021 and a founding fellow of the Transnational Institute
- John Cavanagh (fives player) (died 1819), Irish sportsman
- John Cavanagh (hatter) (1864–1957), New York hatter, mayor of Norwalk, Connecticut

== See also ==
- John Kavanagh (disambiguation)
- John Cavanaugh (disambiguation)
- Jack Kavanagh (disambiguation)
