= Domhnall Spáinneach Mac Murchadha Caomhánach =

King of Leinster
- Tenure: 1595–1632
- Predecessor: Criomthann Mac Murchadha Caomhánach
- Successor: Monarchy abolished
- Born: c. 1550
- Died: 1632 (aged 82); Ireland
- Spouse(s): Eleanor Kavanagh
- Issue: Sir Morgan Kavanagh
- House: Mac Murchadha Caomhánach
- Religion: Catholic

Domhnall Spáinneach Mac Murchadha Caomhánach (sometimes anglicised as Donnell MacMurrough Kavanagh; died 12 March 1632) was the last King of Leinster.

A descendant of Diarmait Mac Murchada (died 1171), Domhnall was the eldest of the two sons of Donnchadh, lord of the Art Buidhe Caomhánach sept, who were reckoned the least powerful of the dynasty. Their lands lay north of Enniscorthy in the Blackstairs Mountains. It appears that at Donnchadh's death, Domhnall was taken into the care of the seneschal of Wexford, Thomas Stukeley. When Stukeley left for Spain in 1568 Domhnall went with him, which explains the origin of his nickname, Spáinneach (Irish for Spaniard).

He returned to Ireland in the mid-1570s and became a leading member of his sept. He became a firm ally of Fiach McHugh O'Byrne with whom he intrigued until the latter's death in 1597. After O'Byrne's death, he intrigued with Hugh O'Neill. When the Nine Years' War ended in 1603, Domhnall submitted and was awarded a pension, as well as recognition of title to his lands.

Domhnall was married to his cousin Eleanor Kavanagh (died in, or after, 1633), daughter of Brian MacMurrough Kavanagh and Elizabeth O'Byrne (died in, or after, 1608), and had a total of six children. He successfully conveyed his property to his son, Sir Morgan Kavanagh (d. 1643). His only known brother was Cathaoir.

Regnal titles
Preceded by Criomthann Mac Murchadha Caomhánach	King of Leinster c.1595–1632	Office abolished
