= Murder of Paul Kavanagh =

2015 killing in Ireland

Paul Kavanagh was an Irish criminal who was murdered in March 2015. He was a debt collector for the Kinahan Organised Crime Group run by Christy Kinahan, a father of two, and also a brother of Gerard Kavanagh and uncle of Jamie Kavanagh. He was originally from Drimnagh and was in his late 20s.

He collected money owed to the Kinahans by other drug dealers, but the Kinahans became convinced that he was keeping some of the money for himself. Gardaí believe that this was the motive for his murder.

== Death ==
He had been renting a house in Drumcondra at the time of his death. His partner drove back from a gym on 26 March 2015 and he was parking the car for her when he was attacked. An eyewitness saw him driving the car, then suddenly reversing at speed. His was stopped by a white Audi that blocked his way. Another witness then heard shots then saw a car hitting another. He then saw two men get out of the car and jog in the direction of Grace Park Road. The Audi was set alight before the killers fled.

His mother identified his remains at the morgue.

== Funeral ==
His funeral was held at Church of Our Lady of Good Counsel on Mourne Road. The mourners included Conor McGregor.
