= Morgan Kavanagh =

Irish poet and novelist

Morgan Kavanagh (c. 1799 – 1874) was an Irish poet, novelist, and author of works on philology. After leaving Ireland at the age of about 25 he lived in both London and Paris and never returned to Ireland. He was the father of the writer Julia Kavanagh. His life was devoted to language, both through his writings and his teaching. His theories concerning the origin of language were often controversial. Kavanagh died in London in 1874.

== Early life ==
Morgan Kavanagh was born in Dublin, Ireland. He initially used the middle name Peter but later dropped it, saying "I have dropped the name of Peter on learning that it was not strictly legal, it being only a name which I adopted when confirmed."

Morgan left Ireland for London in 1824, accompanied by his wife, Bridget, and their infant daughter, Julia. His motive for this move was to seek a publisher for a poetical work entitled The Wanderings of Lucan and Dinah. This work, his first, was published in London through the generosity of an anonymous benefactor. For most of the following 20 years Morgan and his family lived in Paris where he taught English language and literature. One of his pupils was Le Comte d'Ormesson. During this period he was awarded several grants by the Royal Literary Fund. Kavanagh published a second poetical work, The Reign of Lockrin, in 1839.

== Works on philology ==
In 1844 Kavanagh published in London his first work on philology, The Discovery of the Science of Languages. A French edition was also published in Paris. This work postulated the origin of speech in prehistoric "mime" (today we might call it sign language). This was followed over the next 27 years by further publications of a similar nature. These works on philology were uniformly condemned by the academic establishment. For example, Thompson Cooper a near contemporary writing in the Dictionary of National Biography dismissed The Discovery as a "ridiculous work". During this period Morgan submitted several works in competition for the Prix Volney but he was unsuccessful on each occasion. Although Kavanagh was clearly repudiated by his contemporaries, a more recent analysis suggests that his ideas might have had some merit.

== Novels ==
Kavanagh wrote two novels, Aristobulus, The Last Of The Maccabees (1855) and The Hobbies (1857). The latter work was published by T. C. Newby in London and it resulted in a public controversy. When the novel first appeared the title page stated that it was edited by Julia Kavanagh. Julia was, by that time, a successful author in her own right. In a series of letters, between her and Newby, published in the periodical Athenaeum, Julia denied any such involvement and threatened legal action. Newby ultimately printed a new cover page which omitted the reference to Julia. Eileen Fauset suggests that Julia may, in fact, have assisted Morgan with the novel at some point, but wanted nothing to do with the final version.

== Personal life ==
Kavanagh parted from his wife and daughter in about 1844 and returned to London. In 1851 he was living at 28 Dean Street, Soho where he sublet two rooms to Karl Marx and his family. By 1857 Kavanagh had acquired a new partner, Marie. A son (Alfred) was born to them in London at that time and, subsequently, a daughter (Matilda)and a second son (Alexander) were born in Paris. Marie is believed to have died in Paris during the Franco-Prussian War. By 1871 Kavanagh had returned to London and in 1873 was living with a new partner, Louisa. He died in London in 1874 following a fall.

== Publications by Morgan Kavanagh ==
- The Wanderings of Lucan and Dinah, Sherwood and Co., London, (1824)
- The Reign of Lockrin, Whittaker & Co., London, (1839)
- The Discovery of the Science of Languages, Longman, Brown, Green, and Longmans, London, (1844)
- La Découverte de la Science des Langues, Au Comptoir des Imprimeurs-Unis, Paris, (1844)
- Aristobulus, The Last of the Maccabees, Newby, London (1855)
- Myths Traced to their Primary Source through Language, 2 Vols., Newby, London (1856) (Note: There exists an unpublished manuscript of some 680 pages, which was intended to be the third volume of this publication. This manuscript, entitled The Errors of Religion, is held by the National Library of Ireland, Acc 6354.)
- An Author his own Reviewer, J. R. Smith, London (1857)
- The Hobbies, Newby, London (1857)
- Origin of Language and Myths, Sampson, Low, Son, and Marston, London (1871)
