= Tim Cavanagh =

American comedian

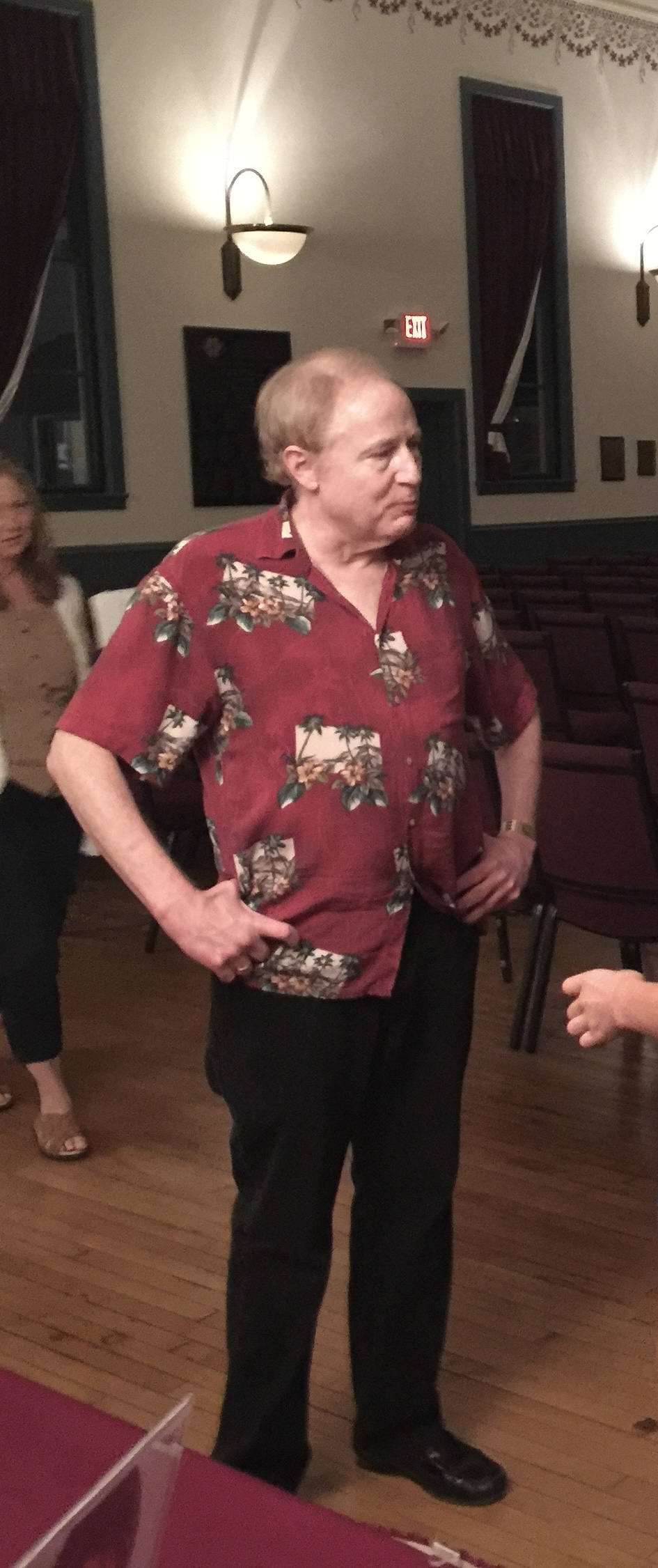
- Cavanagh in 2016.
- Born: July 1953 (age 72); Chicago, Illinois, United States
- Years active: 1976–present

Tim Cavanagh (born July 1953) is an American comedic musician from Chicago.

Cavanagh has been featured on many nationally syndicated radio and television programs. His parody of "99 Red Balloons" ("99 Dead Baboons") was the third most requested song on the Dr. Demento radio show in 1984. He was a regular writer, guest, and contributor on The Danny Bonaduce Show, creating dozens of jingles and songs for use on the show. Since 1997, he has had a regular segment on The Bob & Tom Show, heard every weekday morning in roughly 100 markets nationwide. Cavanagh is also sometimes featured on local programs, including The Jim Krenn Show, a morning drive show in Pittsburgh.

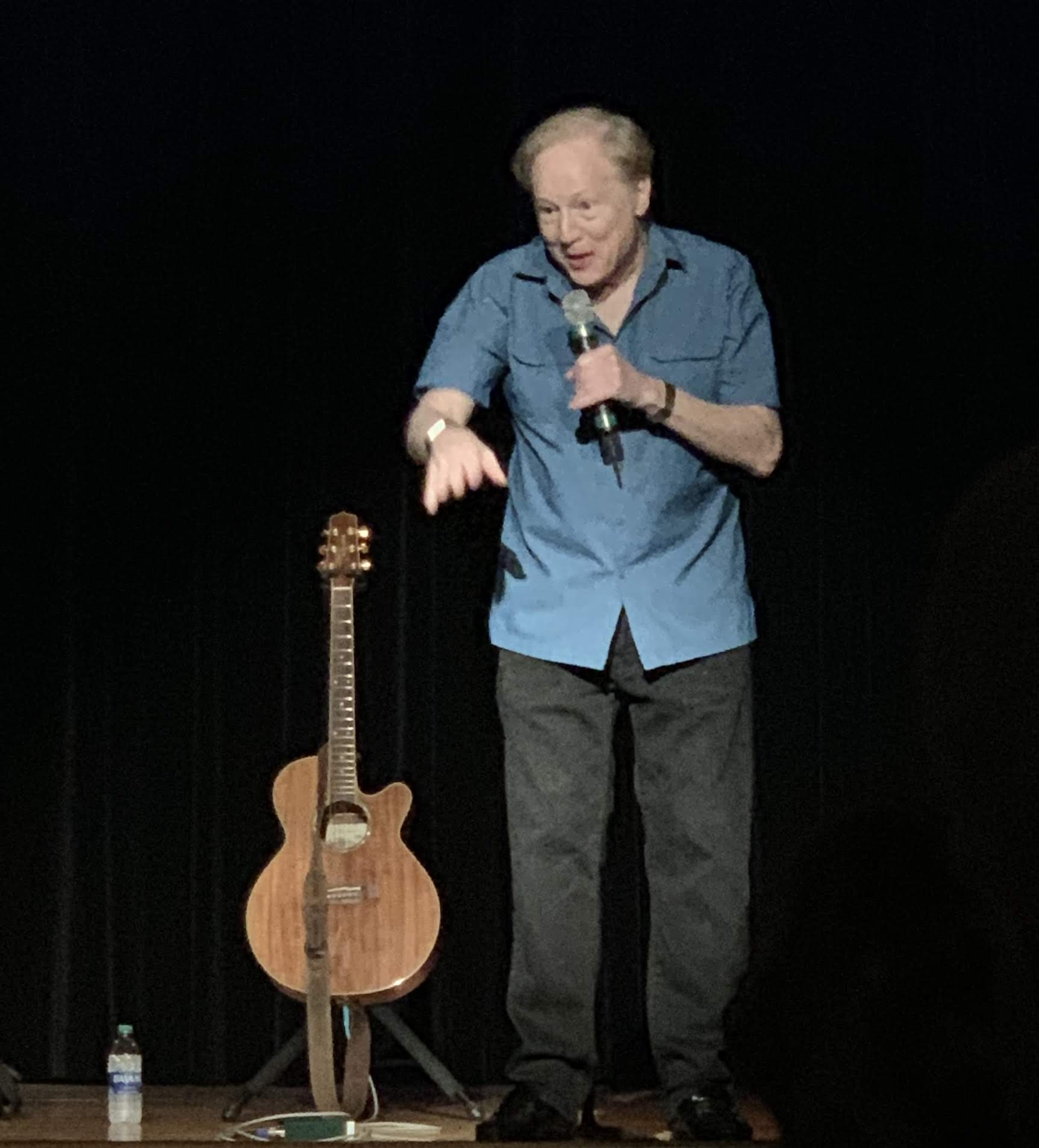
Cavanagh in 2019.

Cavanagh's stand-up routines have been featured on television networks such as ABC, Showtime Network and Comedy Central.
