= Justice Kavanagh =

Justice Kavanagh or Kavanaugh may refer to:

- Brett Kavanaugh (born 1965), associate justice of the Supreme Court of the United States
- Thomas G. Kavanagh (1917–1997), chief justice of the Michigan Supreme Court
- Thomas M. Kavanagh (1909–1975), chief justice of the Michigan Supreme Court

== See also ==
- Megan Cavanagh (judge) (born 1971), chief justice of the Michigan Supreme Court
- Michael Cavanagh (judge) (1940–2025), chief justice of the Michigan Supreme Court
