= Jamie Kavanagh =

Irish boxer

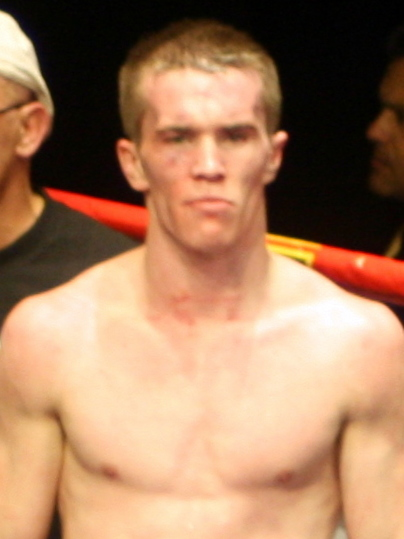
- Kavanagh in his boxing corner in 2011

Personal information
- Nickname: The Nuisance
- Nationality: Irish
- Born: 28 May 1990 (age 36) Dublin, Ireland
- Height: 5 ft 8 in (1.73 m)
- Weight: Lightweight

Boxing career
- Reach: 70 in (180 cm)
- Stance: Orthodox

Boxing record
- Total fights: 22
- Wins: 20
- Win by KO: 10
- Losses: 1
- Draws: 1
- No contests: 0
Medal record
Representing (Republic of Ireland)
AIBA Youth World Boxing Championships
Silver medal – second place	2008 Guadalajara	Light Welterweight

Jamie Kavanagh (born 28 May 1990) is an Irish professional boxer from Dublin. He is currently signed with Golden Boy Promotions.

== Early life ==
Kavanagh grew up in Dublin. He began training at the age of eight, when he joined Crumlin Boxing Club, where he trained with future UFC fighter Conor McGregor. He remained there until he was eleven years old, when Kavanagh and his family moved to Málaga, Spain. It was here where he would meet his longtime trainer, Sedano Ruiz. As a result of his upbringing, Kavanagh is also fluent in Spanish.

== Amateur career ==
Kavanagh had a very successful amateur career, in which he amassed a record of 168 wins and 12 defeats. He won seven Irish national titles in that time, along with eight regional titles.

At international level, Kavanagh won his first gold medal aged 13, when he competed with Ireland at the 2003 'Four Nations' Championships. They faced fighters from England, Scotland and Wales. Later that year, he won silver with Ireland in the 'Round Robin' Championships, another team competition where they fought boxers from England, France, Germany, Italy, Ukraine and Lithuania. In 2005, Kavanagh returned to the 'Four Nations' Championships where he took home a silver medal for Ireland. In the following two years, Kavanagh again competed as part of Ireland's 'Round Robin' Championships team. He took home gold in both 2006 and 2007. Kavanagh's final amateur medal came at the 2008 World Youth Championships in Guadalajara, Mexico. Fighting in the Light Welterweight category, he won silver after losing to Cuban fighter, Frank Isla in the final.

== Professional career ==
Kavanagh turned professional in 2009. He subsequently moved to Los Angeles where he would train under Freddie Roach at the Wild Card Gym, and frequently spar with fighters such as Manny Pacquiao.

Kavanagh won on his professional debut on a card with title contenders Victor Ortiz and Amir Khan on 15 May 2010. Kavanagh was named Irish Boxing's Prospect of the Year at the National Boxing Awards in February 2011, beating off competition from Belfast flyweight Jamie Conlan in the process. On 14 July 2012, he beat Paul Valarde in a unanimous decision. On 3 November 2012, he defeated Ramon Valadez (11–3, 6 KOs) in an 8-round slugfest at the Phoenix Club in Anaheim, California, with some boxing pundits stating that round 3 was a "Round of the year" contender.

In June 2013, it was confirmed that Kavanagh had left Freddie Roach and the Wild Card Gym. "Freddie can’t give me all his time. I need, at this point of my career, to be with someone who can", Kavanagh said. "Freddie hadn’t been with me for the last six fights. I needed to shake things up." After voicing his concerns to Golden Boy, they put him in touch with Joel Díaz, who Kavanagh began training with instead.

In February 2016, Kavanagh was scheduled to fight Portuguese boxer Antonio Joao Benito at the National Stadium in Ireland. During the weigh-in for the match, five gunmen stormed the room, killed Dublin gangster David Byrne and injured two others. The Continuity IRA claimed responsibility for the attack. Later that day, the Boxing Union of Ireland announced that the fight would be cancelled.

== Personal life ==
Kavanagh's father, gangster Gerard "Hatchet" Kavanagh, died in September 2014 after being shot while at an Irish bar in Spain. This led to a nine-month hiatus in Kavanagh's career. Just days after his return to the ring in March 2015, Kavanagh's uncle, Paul, was also shot dead in Dublin. Paul, who was just two years older than Jamie, had been one of Kavanagh's first training partners after introducing him to Crumlin Boxing Club when they were young.

== Professional boxing record ==
20 Wins (10 Knockouts), 1 Loss, 1 Draw
Result	Record	Opponent	Type	Round (Time)	Date	Location	Notes
Win	20-1-1	(Romania) Oszkar Fiko	TKO	7 (8)	2015-11-07	(Republic of Ireland) National Stadium, Dublin	
Win	19-1-1	(Nicaragua) Reynaldo Mora	UD	8 (8)	2015-09-26	(United Kingdom) Wembley Arena, Wembley, London	
Win	18-1-1	(Mexico) Miguel Zamudio	TKO	5 (8), (3:00)	2015-03-20	(United States) Fantasy Springs Casino, Indio, California	
Win	17-1-1	(United States) Michael Clark	TKO	5 (8), (2:49)	2014-06-06	(United States) House of Blues, Boston, Massachusetts	
Win	16-1-1	(Puerto Rico) Andres Navarro	UD	8 (8)	2014-03-17	(United States) House of Blues, Boston, Massachusetts	
Loss	15-1-1	(Mexico) Daniel Ruiz	KO	6 (10), (2:01)	2013-12-14	Arena Quequi, Cancun, Mexico	
Win	15-0-1	(Mexico) Antonio Meza	KO	1 (10)	2013-08-09	(United States) Fantasy Springs Casino, Indio, California	
Win	14-0-1	(Mexico) Adolfo Landeros	TKO	5 (8), (3:00)	2013-06-08	(United States) Home Depot Center, Carson, California	
Win	13-0-1	(Mexico) Salvador Garcia	TD	5 (8)	2013-03-08	(United States) Fantasy Springs Casino, Indio, California	
Win	12-0-1	(United States) Ramon Valadez	UD	8 (8)	2012-11-03	(United States) Phoenix Club, Anaheim, California	
Win	11-0-1	(United States) Paul Velarde	UD	8 (8)	2012-07-14	(United States) Mandalay Bay, Las Vegas, Nevada	
Win	10-0-1	(Mexico) Jorge Ibarra	TKO	2 (6), (2:37)	2012-05-26	Oasis Hotel Complex, Cancun, Mexico	
Win	9-0-1	(United States) Cesar Cisneros	TKO	5 (6), (2:20)	2012-03-24	(United States) Reliant Arena, Houston, Texas	Undercard of James Kirkland vs. Carlos Molina / Erik Morales vs. Danny Garcia
Draw	8-0-1	(Dominican Republic) Ramesis Gil	MD	6 (6)	10 Dec 2011	(United States) Convention Center, Washington DC	
Win	8-0-0	(United States) Marcos Herrera	UD	6 (6)	2011-07-23	(United States) Mandalay Bay, Las Vegas, Nevada	
Win	7-0-0	(United States) John Willoughby	TKO	3 (6)	2011-06-23	(United States) Club Nokia, Los Angeles, California	
Win	6-0-0	(United Kingdom) Sid Razak	UD	6 (6)	2011-04-16	Manchester Arena, Manchester, United Kingdom	
Win	5-0-0	(Mexico) Ramon Flores	UD	6 (6)	2011-02-24	(United States) Club Nokia, Los Angeles, California	
Win	4-0-0	(United States) Jacob Thornton	TKO	1 (4), (0:44)	2010-12-11	(United States) Mandalay Bay, Las Vegas, Nevada	
Win	3-0-0	(United States) Ricardo Malfavon	UD	4 (4)	2010-09-30	(United States) Club Nokia, Los Angeles, California	
Win	2-0-0	(Mexico) Luis Sanchez	UD	4 (4)	2010-06-24	(United States) Club Nokia, Los Angeles, California	
Win	1-0-0	(United States) William Ware	TKO	1 (4), (1:07)	2010-05-15	(United States) Madison Square Garden, New York, New York	Professional debut
