= Gerard Kavanagh =

Irish criminal and gangster

Gerard "Hatchet" Kavanagh was an Irish criminal who was a former boxer and senior member of the Kinahan Organised Crime Group run by Christy Kinahan. He would demand payment of drug debts with menaces. He was originally from Drimnagh. He was also father of Jamie Kavanagh.

He was also involved in professional boxing in Boston, UK.

== Criminal history ==
He was a drug dealer who mainly supplied drugs in Tallaght. He moved to Spain almost ten years before his death.

He was a cousin and criminal associate of James Mulvey.

== Death ==
He was shot dead at Harmon's Irish bar in Elviria, Spain on 6 September 2014. Two men attacked him and he was hit nine times. He was 44 years old at the time of his death.

== Funeral ==
His funeral was held at Church of Our Lady of Good Counsel on Mourne Road. Gardaí drove unmarked Garda cars around Drimnagh during the funeral and the Garda Emergency Response Unit was on standby during the funeral, though no uniformed Gardaí were visible.

== Other relatives ==
His brother Paul Kavanagh, who was also involved with the Kinahan gang, was shot dead on 26 March 2015 in Drumcondra.
