= Julia Kavanagh =

Irish novelist (1824–1877)

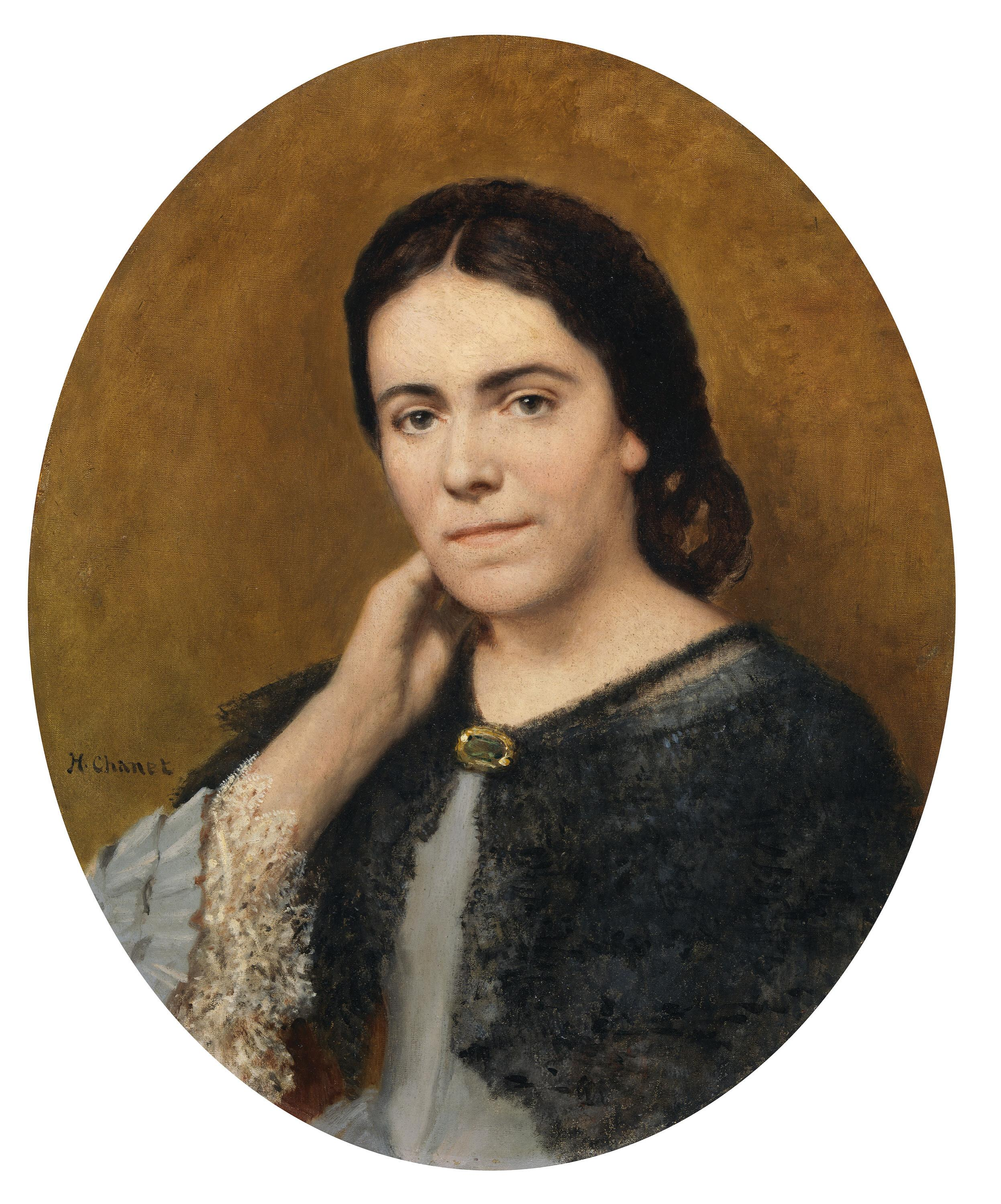
- Portrait of the author Julia Kavanagh c.1874-1876 by French painter Henri Chanet, fl.1874-1884. Donated by Mrs M. Kavanagh, 1884 to the National Gallery of Ireland.
- Born: 7 January 1824; Thurles, County Tipperary, Ireland
- Died: 28 October 1877 (aged 53); Nice, France
- Family: Morgan and Bridget Kavanagh

Julia Kavanagh (7 January 1824 – 28 October 1877) was an Irish novelist, born at Thurles in County Tipperary, Ireland—then part of the United Kingdom of Great Britain and Ireland. Her numerous contributions to literature have classified her as one of the non-canonical minor novelists of the Victorian period (1837–1901). Although she is mainly known for the novel and tales she wrote, she also published important non-fiction works that explored the theme of female political, moral and philosophical contributions to society. The appeal of her works is represented by the fact that several of her works have been translated into French, German, Italian, Dutch and Swedish. Her texts also reached North America, where some of her works appeared in Littell's Living Age, an American magazine. Moreover, she was known to celebrated writers of domestic fiction such as Charles Dickens.

== Biography ==
Born in Thurles, a small town in Munster, Ireland, Julia was the only child of Morgan Kavanagh (died 1874), author of various philological works and some poems, and Bridget Kavanagh (née Fitzpatrick). On 9 January she was baptized in the "Big Chapel," a Catholic church, where the clerk misspelled her name as "Cavanah." Before she was a year old, her family moved to London, and soon after to Paris. Julia spent several years of her early life with her parents in Paris, laying the foundations for a mastery of the French language and gaining insight into French modes of thought, eventually perfected by her later frequent and long residences in France. Her father, Morgan, was a language teacher and he also published books of poetry, novels, and several works on philology. An attempt to capitalize on his daughter's literary fame by adding her as co-author to one of his published novels brought Julia much annoyance.

Kavanagh's literary career began in 1844 at the age of 20, when she moved with her mother, after separating from her father in France. Thereafter she supported herself and her almost blind mother, Bridget (a lifelong companion), with her writing career. In June 1850, she requested to meet Charlotte Brontë, who later described her as 'a little, almost dwarfish figure to which even I had to look down [Charlotte Brontë was less than five feet tall] - not deformed - that is - not hunchbacked but long-armed and with a large head and (at first sight) a strange face.' At first she started to write small essays and tales for journals and newspapers. Among the different journals she wrote for were Chambers Edinburgh Journal, Household Words, All the Year Round, The Month, People's Journal, Popular Record, Temple Bar, and Argosy. Once she had acquired some reputation she started to write her own books. Her first book was Three Paths (1847), a story for the young; but her first work that attracted notice was Madeleine, a Tale of Auvergne (1848), a story of "heroic charity and living faith founded on fact".

Julia and her mother were again living in Paris from the early 1860s, but moved to Rouen and then to Nice upon the outbreak of the Franco-Prussian War. Julia died after a fall in Nice in 1877, still unmarried and a lifelong devout Catholic. Her last words, in French, were: "Oh Mama! how silly I am to have fallen". She is buried with her mother in the Cimitiere du Chateau, on the hill above the Old Town to the east of Nice. A notice of her death appeared in The Belfast Newsletter. Bridget continued to live in Nice until her death in 1888. In 1884 she donated a painting of Julia by Henri Chanet to the National Gallery of Ireland.

== Works ==
The scenes of Kavanagh's stories are almost always set in France. Her style is domestic, simple and pleasing, aimed at younger woman readers; her main characters tend to be strong independent and resourceful women. She was popular and had a loyal readership. She was also a prolific contributor to periodical literature, and also wrote many biographical sketches. Modern scholars see a pronounced awareness of gender politics in Kavanagh's writing and view her as a writer whose works consciously exposed the anomalies of social and sexual difference while still adhering to the conventions of the time.

Her works include:

- The Three Paths (1847)
- Madeleine, a Tale of Auvergne (1848)
- Women in France during the Eighteenth Century (1850)
- Nathalie (1851)
- Women of Christianity (1852)
- Daisy Burns (1853)
- Rachel Gray (1855)
- Grace Lee (1855)
- Adele (1857)
- A Summer and Winter in the Two Sicilies (1858)
- Seven Years and Other Tales (1859)
- French Women of Letters (1862)
- English Women of Letters (1862)
- Queen Mab (1863)
- Beatrice (1865)
- Dora (1868)
- Silvia (1870)
- Bessie (1872)
- Sybil's Second Love (1872)
- John Dorrien (1875)
- The Pearl Fountain and Other Fairy Tales (1877)
- Forget-Me-Nots (1878, posthumous edition, preface by C. W. Wood)

Journals: contributions of non-fiction

- 'The Montyon Prizes' in Chambers Miscellany. (1846)
- 'The French Working Classes' in People's Journal. (1846)
- 'Prizes of Virtue in France' in People's Journal. (1846)
- 'Literature of the Working Classes of France' in People's Journal. (1847)

Journals: contributions of short stories

- Chambers Edinburgh Journal (All reprinted in Seven Years and Other Tales)
  - 'Gaiety and Gloom', (1847)
  - 'Young France', (1847)
  - 'Soirée in a Porter's Lodge', (1847)
  - 'The Cheap Excursion', (1847)
  - 'The Mysterious Lodger', (1847)
  - 'A Comedy in a Courtyard', (1847)
- Household Words (Also reprinted in a revised form in Seven Years and Other Tales)
  - 'An Excellent Opportunity', (1850)
- Temple Bar
  - 'Mimi's Sin', (1868)
  - 'By the Well', (1868)
  - 'My Brother Leonard', (1869)
  - 'By the Well', (1869)
- All the Year Round (Reprinted in Forget-Me-Nots)
  - 'Sister Anne' (1868)
- Argosy (All reprinted in Forget-Me-Nots and Littell's Living Age)
  - 'Miller of Manneville', (1872)
  - 'Nina, the Witch', (1873)
  - 'Clement's Love', (1877)
  - Story of a Letter', (1878)
  - 'Perpétue: A sketch', (1878)
- Littell's Living Age
  - 'Annette's Love Story' (1870)
  - 'Story of Monique' (1876)
