= Bryan Kavanaugh =

17th century Irish Jacobite soldier

- Coat-of-arms
- Nickname: na Stroake
- Born: 1661; Drummin, County Carlow, Ireland
- Died: February 8, 1735
- Buried: St. Mullins, County Carlow, Ireland 52°29′22″N 6°55′44″W
- Conflicts: Battle of the Boyne, Battle of Aughrim

Bryan Kavanaugh was a member of the Irish aristocracy and soldier in the Williamite War in Ireland. Reputed to be one of the tallest soldiers in the Irish Jacobite army of King James II of England. Bryan's nickname (stróic meaning tear or rent in Irish) refers to a scar on his face he received in a duel with one of William III of England's officers at the Battle of the Boyne.

== Family ==
Bryan na Stroake was a member of the Carlow and Wexford Caomhánach branch of the MacMurrough Kavanagh dynasty. He married Mary Murphy of Wexford. His son, John Baptist Kavanagh, Baron Gniditz in Bohemia, was made Count of the Holy Roman Empire on August 18, 1768, and his grandson, Maurice Ignatius Kavanagh, rose to the rank of Lt. General in the Austrian army.

== Grave ==
He is buried in St. Mullin's graveyard, where his gravestone states “Here lies the body of Bryan Kavanaugh of Drummin of the family of Ballyleaugh, A man remarkably known to the nobility and gentry of Ireland, by the name Bryan Na Stroake from his noble actions and valour in King James troops in the battles of the Boyne and Aughrim.”

== Sources ==
- Miscellaneous Stories of Caomhanachs in Exile. The Past: the Organ of the Uí Cinsealaigh Historical Society 27: 96-106 (2006)
- Clan Kavanagh in the Imperial Service. Colonel Cavenagh, Journal of the Royal Society of Antiquaries of Ireland, Sixth Series, Vol. 12, No. 1 (June 30, 1922) pp 42–51.
- John B. Kavanagh, Baron Gniditz. MacSwiney of Mashanaglass, The Journal of the Royal Society of Antiquaries of Ireland, Sixth Series, Vol. 18, No. 2 (Dec. 31, 1928), pp 164–166
