= John Kavanagh =

John Kavanagh may refer to:

- John Kavanagh (actor) (born c. 1940s), Irish actor
- John Kavanagh (Arizona politician) (born 1950), American politician from Arizona
- John Kavanagh (bishop) (1913–1985), Catholic Bishop of Dunedin, 1949–1985
- John Kavanagh (martial artist) (born 1977), Irish martial arts coach
- John Kavanagh (Newfoundland politician) (1814–1884), Newfoundland politician
- John Francis Kavanagh (1903–1984), Irish sculptor and artist

== See also ==
- John Kavanaugh (fl. 1980s–2010s), American composer, lyricist and musical director
- Jack Kavanagh (disambiguation)
- John Cavanagh (disambiguation)
- John Cavanaugh (disambiguation)
