= Martin Kavanagh (historian) =

Canadian historian (1895–1987)

Martin Kavanagh (1895–1987) was a teacher and historian.

Kavanagh was born in County Wicklow, Ireland and received an extensive education in Ireland and England before coming to Canada in 1923. He taught in three locations in Manitoba and pursued his interest in the history of the prairies. This resulted in two well documented and well written history books which gave important insight into these early times. The books are: The Assiniboine Basin: A Social Study of Discovery, Exploration and Settlement and La Vérendrye - His Life and Times.
