= Cahir mac Art Kavanagh =

Irish magnate (died 1554)

Cahir mac Art Kavanagh, "The MacMurrough" and descendent of the Kings of Leinster, also Lord of St. Molyns, and baron of Ballyann (died 1554), was an Irish magnate of the Tudor period.

== Biography ==
Cahir was the eldest son of Art Kavanagh of St. Molyns (Teach Molyns), and chief of his sept, and a great-great-grandson of Art MacMurrough-Kavanagh. He took part in the rebellion of the Leinster Geraldines, but submitted to Lord Leonard Grey in 1538. He renewed his submission to Sir Anthony St. Leger in November 1540, and preferred a request to be allowed to hold his land in feudal tenure. He was anxious, he declared, to imitate his ancestor, Diarmait Mac Murchada, king of Leinster, who had introduced the English into Ireland, and by adopting English customs to assist in the re-establishment of the English authority in the island.

Though not a baron of parliament, he was allowed to sit in the Parliament of Ireland held by St. Leger in Dublin in 1541, and in 1543 he obtained a grant of the lordship of St. Molyns to himself and his heirs, 'without any division or partition to be made therein between his kinsmen', on condition of building himself a house or mansion at Pollmounty, of maintaining the accustomed fairs there, and of exercising a vigilant watch over the pass. In 1544 he furnished nineteen kern (soldiers), under the command of Captain Edmond Mac Cahir Kavanagh, to the Irish contingent employed at the siege of Boulogne; and in the following year he defeated his rival, Gerald Mac Cahir Kavanagh, with great slaughter, in the neighbourhood of Hacketstown.

His assumption of the title of Mac Murrough aroused the suspicion of Sir Edward Bellingham, which was further increased by his refusal, 'sticking to the Brehon law of restitution', to hang one of his followers for horse-stealing. His explanations were, however, deemed sufficient, and the Lord Deputy expressed himself satisfied with his 'good conformity and constancy in the king's service'.

In 1550 he surprised the castle of Ferns, and Sir James Croft, regarding it as an act of rebellion, invaded his country. He acknowledged his offence, and at a great council held in Dublin on 4 November publicly renounced his title of Mac Murrough. His possessions were considerably restricted, and he obtained permission to make his explanations in person to Edward VI. On 8 February 1553–4, he was created baron of Ballyann for life, but died shortly afterwards.

== Personal life ==
He married Cecilia, daughter of Gerald FitzGerald, 9th Earl of Kildare, and had six sons, viz.: Brian, who married a daughter of Hugh Mac Shane O'Byrne; Tirrelagh, who married a sister of Robert Browne of Mulrankan, in the barony of Bargy, Co. Wexford, whose tragic fate is narrated in Holinshed; Crean, Moriertagh, Art, and Dermot, who for his good and faithful services was, on 18 March 1555, appointed tanist to the chieftaincy of the clan. Cahir Mac Art Caomhánach is an interesting figure in Irish history as the founder of an estate which, notwithstanding the vicissitudes of land tenure in Ireland, still remains in the possession of his lineal descendants.
