= Domhnall Caomhánach =

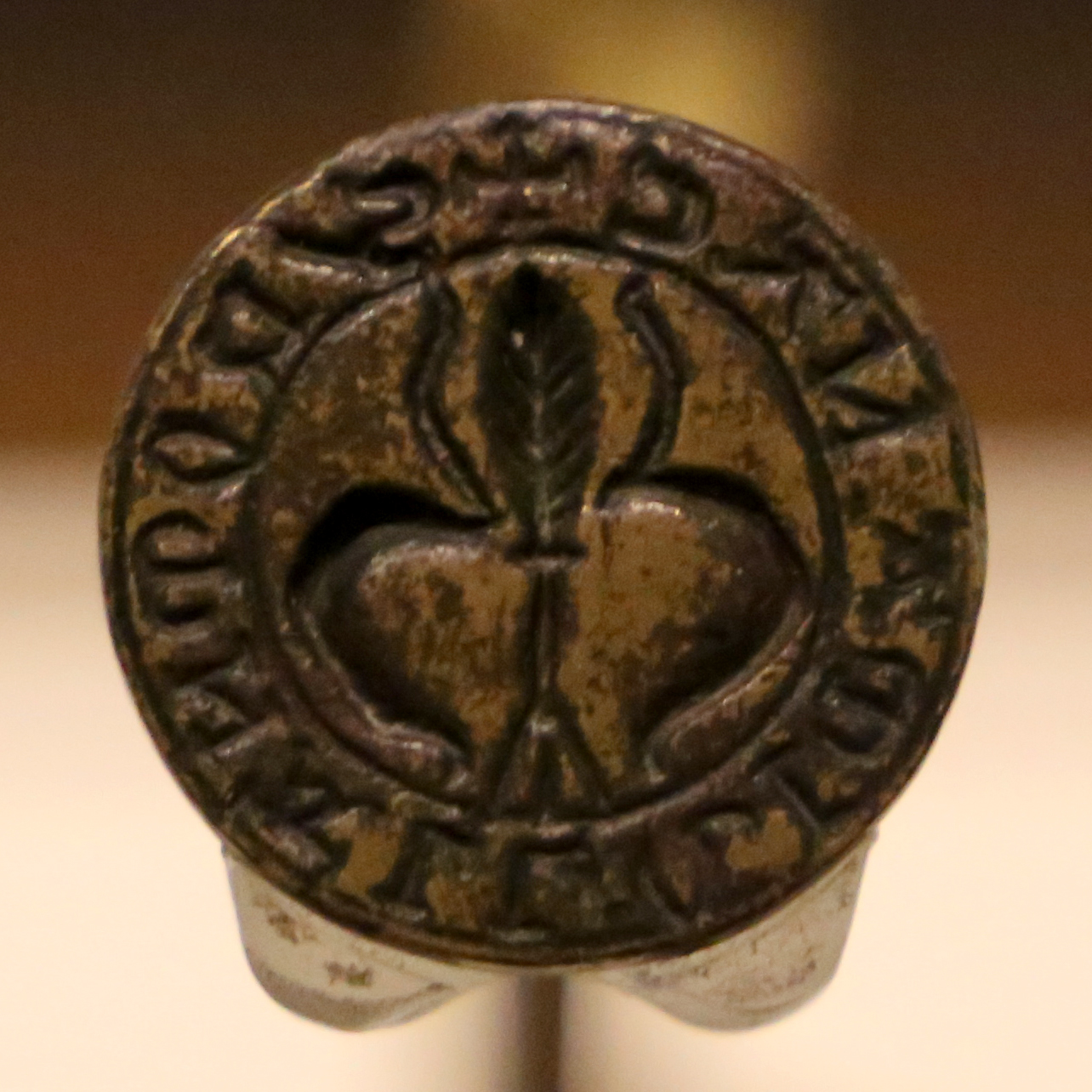
- Seal matrix of Domhnall Caomhánach with fleur-de-lys and text DOMNALL KIMANAC

King of Leinster in Ireland
- Reign: 1171–1175
- Predecessor: Diarmait Mac Murchada
- Successor: Muirchertach Caomhánach son of Domhnall Oge Caomhánach
- Born: c. 1140; Leinster in Ireland
- Died: 1175 (aged 34–35); Battle of Naas in 1175
- Burial: Ferns, County Wexford
- Issue: (1) Connor Caomhánach (2) Domhnall Oge
- Dynasty: Caomhánach
- Father: Diarmait Mac Murchada
- Mother: Sadb Ní Faeláin

Domhnall Caomhánach (Domhnall Mac Murchada or Domhnall Caomhánach Mac Murchada, anglicized as Donal Kavanagh) is the ancestor of the Caomhánach line of the Uí Ceinnselaig dynasty and was King of Leinster from 1171 to 1175. Domhnall was the eldest son of the 12th century King of Leinster, Diarmait Mac Murchada in Ireland.

Domhnall was fostered for his training and education by the coarb of the monastery of St. Caomhán at Kilcavan near Gorey, County Wexford. Fosterage was common practice in Medieval Ireland, with some aristocrats being fostered by clergymen or monastic schools.

It was due to Domhnall's fosterage at the monastery that he adopted the name Caomhánach (an adjective of the name Caomhán, meaning "of Caomhán", in modern English "of Kevin"). This was contrary to the practice of using an inherited surname that had come into use from around the 10th century. His descendants subsequently adopted this name as an inherited surname.

== King of Leinster ==
After the death of his father Diarmait Mac Murchada (English: Dermot Mac Murrough) in 1171, Domhnall was proclaimed King of Leinster by some clan chiefs, in line with the traditional Brehon law. Domhnall's legitimacy to the title was widely disputed by the Cambro-Norman invaders who viewed that their leader, Strongbow (Richard de Clare, the 2nd Earl of Pembroke), was the legitimate successor due to his marriage to Domhnall's sister Aoife/Eva and that Domhnall's claim was "illegitimate" under Norman law.

In any case, Diarmait had given Leinster as a dowry with Aoife/Eva on her marriage to Strongbow, and there is no record that Domhnall publicly opposed her endowment at the time of her marriage.

In 1175, it is recorded in the Annals of the Kingdom of Ireland that Domhnall was killed by O' Foirtchern and O' Nolan during the Battle of Naas. He is buried near his father Diarmait Mac Murchada in the Cathedral graveyard of Ferns village. After his death, Domhnall was succeeded as King by his grandson Muirchertach, the son of Domhnall Oge Caomhánach.

== See also ==
- Kings of Leinster
- Diarmait Mac Murchada
- Caomhánach

Preceded by Diarmait Mac Murchada	King of Leinster c.1171–1175	Succeeded by Muirchertach mac Domhnall mac Domhnall Caomhánach Mac Murchadha
