= Killeshin Church =

12th century church in Laois, Ireland

- Glenn Uisin
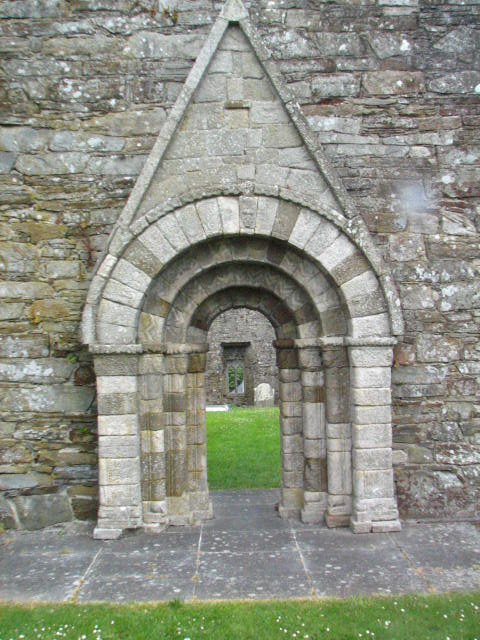

- Location within Ireland
- Interactive map of Killeshin Church

Monastery information
- Other names: Killushin, Glenn Ussen, Glenn Uissen, Glenn Uisen
- Order: Celtic Christianity
- Established: AD 545
- Diocese: Leighlin

People
- Founder: Saint Diarmait mac Siabairr
- Important associated figures: Saint Comgán

Architecture
- Status: Inactive
- Heritage designation: National Monument
- Style: Irish monastic, Romanesque

Site
- Location: Killeshin, County Laois
- Coordinates: 52.84738°N 7.00151°W
- Visible remains: Part of church (west and east gables; part of north elevation)
- Public access: yes

Killeshin Church is a 12th-century Romanesque church and National Monument located in County Laois, Ireland.

== Location ==
Killeshin Church is located near Killeshin village, on the south bank of the Fushoge River (a tributary of the Barrow), about 5 km (3 mi) west of Carlow town. A ringfort, known as Killeshin moat, stands to the southeast.

== History ==
A monastery was founded on the site c. AD 545 by Diarmait mac Siabairr, a member of the local Uí Bairrche ruling family.

The monastery was plundered by Diarmait mac Máel na mBó in 1041; the dairthech (oak prayer house) was demolished, a hundred people taken away as slaves and 700 cattle also seized. This attack was a retaliation against the burning of Ferns by Murchadh mac Dunlaing and the murder of Domnall Remar (Donal the Fat, Diarmait's brother). Killeshin was burned again in 1077, along with its yew trees.

None of this original monastery survives; a round tower once stood there but was torn down by the landowner in 1704.

== The buildings ==
The church, built in the 12th century AD (probably in 1150–60), is built of rubble masonry with dressed quoins and is particularly noted for its Romanesque archway, zoomorphic carvings and Scandinavian-influenced knotwork. There is also a granite font.

An inscription near the door reads ORAIT DO DIARMAIT RI LAGEN, Middle Irish for "a prayer for Diarmait, king of Leinster", referring to Diarmait Mac Murchada (r. 1126–71).
