= Diarmait Mac Murchada =

King of Leinster, Ireland (1110 – 1171)

Diarmait Mac Murchadha
- King of Leinster
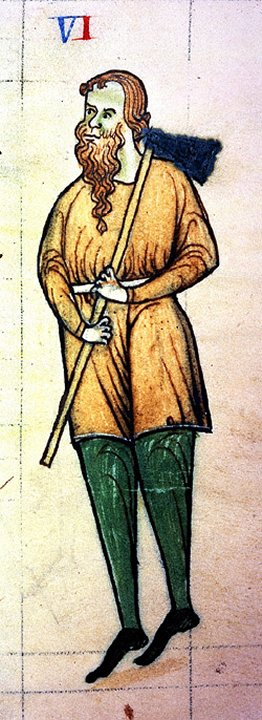
- Diarmait as depicted in the Expugnatio Hibernica, c. 1189

King of Leinster in Ireland
- Reign: 1126–1171
- Predecessor: Enna mac Donnchada Mac Murchada
- Successor: Domhnall Caomhánach mac Murchada (de iure); Richard de Clare (de facto)
- Born: c. 1110; Kingdom of Leinster
- Died: c. 1 May 1171
- Burial: Ferns
- Spouse: 1. Sadb Ní Faeláin (c. 1132); 2. Mór Ní Tuathail
- Issue: Órlaith; Domhnall; Énna; Aoife; Conchobar
- House: Uí Chennselaig
- Father: Donnchadh mac Murchada
- Mother: Órlaith ingen Ní Bhraonáin

Diarmait Mac Murchada (Modern Irish: Diarmaid Mac Murchadha; anglicised as Dermot MacMurrough or Dermot MacMurphy; c. 1110 – c. 1 May 1171), was King of Leinster in Ireland from 1127 to 1171. In 1167, he was deposed by the High King of Ireland, Ruaidrí Ua Conchobair. To recover his kingdom, Mac Murchada solicited help from King Henry II of England. His issue unresolved, he gained the military support of the Richard de Clare, 2nd Earl of Pembroke (otherwise known as "Strongbow"), thus initiating the Anglo-Norman invasion of Ireland.

In exchange for his aid, Mac Murchada promised Strongbow the hand in marriage of his daughter Aoife and the right to succeed to the Kingship of Leinster. Henry II then mounted a larger second invasion in 1171 to ensure his control over Strongbow, resulting in the Norman Lordship of Ireland. Mac Murchada was later known as Diarmait na nGall (Irish for "Diarmait of the Foreigners"). He was seen in Irish history as the king that invited the first-ever wave of Anglo-Norman settlers, who were planted by the Norman conquest. The invasion had a great deal of impact on Irish Christianity, increasing the de facto ability of the Holy See to regulate Christianity in Ireland.

== Early life and family ==
Diarmait was born around 1110, although one reference proposes a birth year as early as 1090. He was a son of Donnchadh mac Murchada, King of Leinster and Dublin, and Orlaith ingen Ní Bhraonáin. His father's paternal grandmother, Derbforgaill, was a daughter of Donnchad, King of Munster and thus a granddaughter of Brian Boru. In 1115, Diarmait's father attacked Domnall Gerrlámhach, King of Dublin, but died in the ensuing battle. The citizens of Dublin buried him with the carcass of a dog, considered to be a huge insult.

Diarmait had two wives (as allowed under the Brehon laws), the first of whom, Sadhbh Ní Faeláin, was mother of his eldest son Domhnall Caomhánach mac Murchada (1140 - 1175) and a daughter named Órlaith (born in 1138) who married Domnall Mór, King of Munster. His second wife, Mór Ní Thuathail, was the half-sister of St. Lorcán Ua Tuathail (St. Lawrence O'Toole) and the mother of Diarmait's daughter Aoife (also known as Eva of Leinster, 1153 - 1188) and his youngest son Conchobar Mac Murchada (dead in 1170). He also had another son, Énna Cennselach mac Murchada (born in 1142, blinded in 1169). Diarmait is buried in the Cathedral graveyard of Ferns village.

== King of Leinster ==
After the death of his older brother, Énna Mac Murchada, Diarmait unexpectedly became King of Leinster. This was opposed by the then High King of Ireland, Toirdelbach Ua Conchobair (Turlough O'Conor) who feared (rightly) that Mac Murchada would become a rival. Toirdelbach sent one of his allied kings, Tigernán Ua Ruairc (Tiernan O'Rourke) to conquer Leinster and oust the young Mac Murchada. Ua Ruairc went on a brutal campaign slaughtering the livestock of Leinster and thereby trying to starve the province's residents. Mac Murchada was ousted from his throne, but was able to regain it with the help of the Leinster clans in 1132. Afterwards followed two decades of uneasy peace between Ua Conchobair and Diarmait. In 1152 he even assisted the High King to raid the land of Ua Ruairc who had by then become a renegade.

Mac Murchada also is said to have abducted Ua Ruairc's wife Derbforgaill (English: Dervorgilla) along with all her furniture and goods, with the aid of Derbforgaill's brother, a future pretender to the kingship of Meath. Other sources say that Derbforgaill was not an unwilling prisoner and that she remained in Ferns with Mac Murchada in comfort for a number of years. Her advanced age indicates that she may have been a refugee or a hostage; in any case, she was under his protection. Whatever the reality, the "abduction" was given as a further reason or excuse for enmity between the two kings.

== Church builder ==
As king of Leinster, in the years 1140–70 Diarmait commissioned the Irish Romanesque buildings of:

- Baltinglass Abbey
- St Saviour's Priory, Glendalough
- Ferns Abbey
- Killeshin Church

He sponsored convents (nunneries) at Dublin (St Mary's, 1146), and around 1151 two more at Aghade, County Carlow and at Kilculliheen near Waterford city. The abbey of St. Mary Del Hogge in Dublin was named after the Hoggen Green or Haugr meaning gravesite in old Norse. This site later became 'College Green' after the Reformation and the establishment of Trinity College. It's said that in the late 1600s that Viking graves were still to be seen at Hoggen Green.

He also sponsored the successful career of churchman St Lawrence O'Toole (Lorcán Ua Tuathail). He married O'Toole's half-sister Mór in 1153 and presided at the synod of Clane in 1161 when O'Toole was installed as archbishop of Dublin.

== Exile and return ==
In 1166, Ireland's High King and Mac Murchada's main ally Muirchertach Ua Lochlainn had fallen, and a large coalition led by Tigernán Ua Ruairc (Mac Murchada's arch enemy) marched on Leinster. The new High King Ruaidrí Ua Conchobair deposed Mac Murchada from the throne of Leinster. Mac Murchada fled to Wales and from there to England and France seeking the support of Henry II of England in the recruitment of soldiers to reclaim his kingship. Henry authorised Diarmait to seek help from the soldiers and mercenaries in his kingdom. Those who agreed to help included Richard de Clare and half-brothers Robert FitzStephen and Maurice FitzGerald. Robert was accompanied by his half-nephew Robert de Barry. Strongbow was offered Diarmait's daughter Aoife in marriage and promised the kingship of Leinster on Diarmait's death. Robert and Maurice were promised lands in Wexford and elsewhere for their services.

On returning to Wales, Robert FitzStephen helped him organise a mercenary army of English and Welsh soldiers. Landing at Bannow Bay, they laid siege to Wexford which fell in May 1169. After a period of inactivity, they went on to raid the Kingdom of Ossory. They then launched raids in the territories of the Uí Tuathail, the Uí Broin, and Uí Conchobhair Failghe. Mac Murchada gambled that King Ruaidrí would not hurt the Leinster hostages which he had, which included Mac Murchada's son, Conchobar Mac Murchada. Although he had been distracted by disturbances elsewhere in the kingdom, King Ruaidrí could no longer ignore this powerful force.

He marched his forces into Leinster and, with the mediation of the Church, the commanders of the two armies began negotiations at Ferns, Diarmait's political base. An agreement was reached, whereby Diarmait was allowed to remain King of Leinster with Diarmait for his part recognising Ua Conchobair as High King. Some historians maintain that the treaty with Ua Conchobair included a secret agreement whereby Diarmait undertook to bring in no more foreign mercenaries and to send away Robert FitzStephen and his men as soon as Leinster was subdued. It's possible that Mac Murchada's hand may have been forced by the arrival at Wexford in May 1170 of Maurice FitzGerald, Lord of Llanstephan and his force of 10 knights, thirty men-at-arms and a hundred archers and foot soldiers. Mac Murchada and FitzGerald marched on the Ostman Norse–Gaelic city of Dublin which surrendered. Within a short time, all Leinster was again in Mac Murchada's control. Emboldened by these victories, he sent Robert FitzStephen to the assistance of his son-in-law, Domnall Mór Ua Briain, the King of Thomond.

In the opinion of some historians, Mac Murchada's plans may have been limited to the recovery of his throne; only later when the superiority of the mercenary arms had overawed the Gaelic nobility of Ireland did he consider tilting at the high kingship itself. According to the contemporary Gerald of Wales, he was advised by Robert FitzStephen and Maurice FitzGerald to write to Strongbow requesting assistance. Strongbow sent an advance party under Raymond le Gros, arriving himself in 1170 at the Ostman Norse–Gaelic settlement of Waterford. Following the fall of Waterford, the promised marriage of Aoife and Strongbow took place. As a result, Richard FitzGilbert, count of Strigoil, became lord of Leinster. The marriage was imagined and painted in the Romantic style in 1854 by Daniel Maclise.

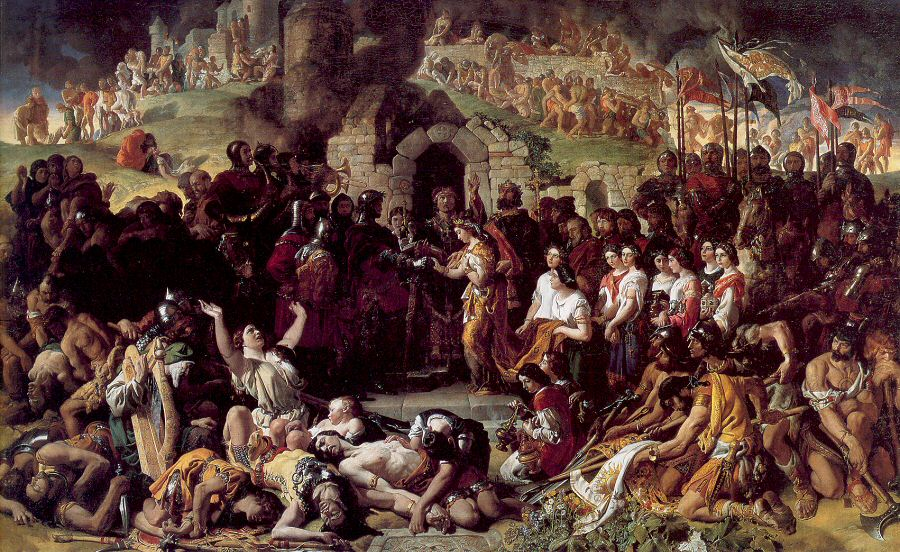
The Marriage of Aoife and Strongbow (1854) by Daniel Maclise, a romanticised depiction of the union between Aoife and Richard de Clare in the ruins of Waterford

== Death and historical aftermath ==
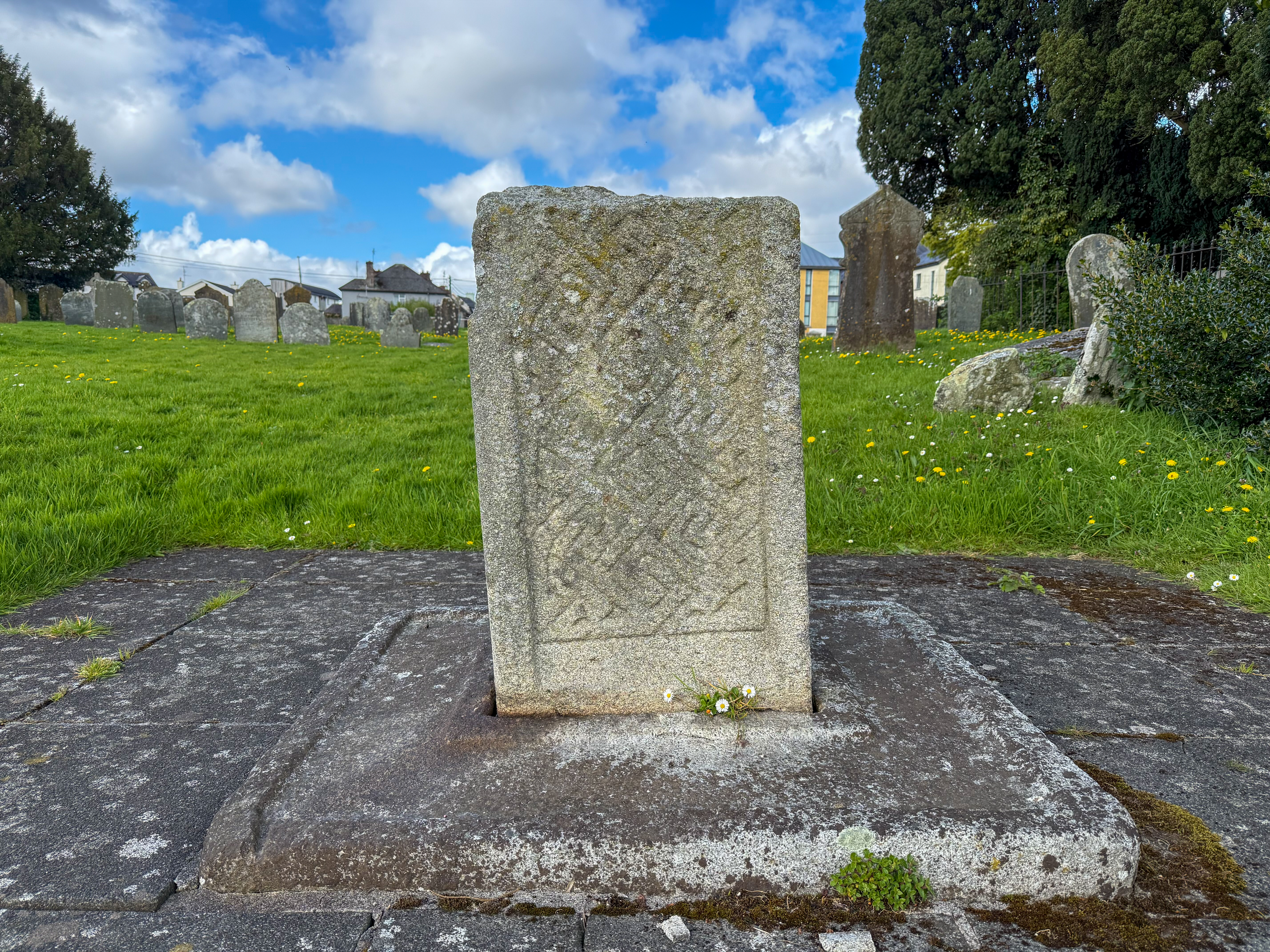
Identified burial site of Diarmuid MacMurrough at Ferns Cathedral

Diarmait was devastated after the death of his youngest son, Conchobar, and he retreated to Ferns, died a few months later (about 1 May 1171), and was buried at Ferns Cathedral, where his reputed grave can be seen in the outside graveyard.

After Strongbow's successful invasion, Henry II mounted a second and larger invasion in 1171 to ensure his control over his subjects, which succeeded. He then accepted the submission of the Irish kings in Dublin in November 1171. He also ensured that his moral claim to Ireland, granted by the supposed 1155 papal bull Laudabiliter, was reconfirmed in 1172 by Pope Alexander III, and also by a synod of all the Irish bishops at the Synod of Cashel. He added "Lord of Ireland" to his many other titles. Before he could consolidate his new Lordship he had to go to France to deal with his sons' rebellion in 1173.

Ruaidrí Ua Conchobair was soon ousted, first as King of Ireland and eventually as King of Connacht. The Lordship directly controlled a small territory in Ireland surrounding the cities of Dublin and Waterford, while the rest of Ireland was divided between English lords and court curiales. The 1175 Treaty of Windsor, brokered by St Lawrence O'Toole with Henry II, formalised the submission of the Gaelic clans that remained in local control, like the Uí Conchobair who retained Connacht and the Uí Néill who retained most of Ulster.

== Legacy and reputation ==
The scholar Áed Ua Crimthainn was probably Diarmait's court historian. In his Book of Leinster, Áed seems to be the first to set out the concept of the rí Érenn co fressabra, the "king of Ireland with opposition", later more widely adopted. This described Diarmait's ambitions and the achievements of his great-grandfather Diarmait mac Maíl na mBó.

In Irish history books written after 1800, Diarmait Mac Murchada was often seen as a traitor, but his intention was not to aid an English invasion of Ireland, but rather to use Henry's assistance to become the High King of Ireland himself.

Gerald of Wales, a Cambro-English cleric who visited Ireland in 1185 and whose uncles and cousins were prominent soldiers in the army of Strongbow, repeated their opinions of Mac Murchada:

Dermot was a man tall of stature and stout of frame; a soldier whose heart was in the fray, and held valiant among his own nation. From often shouting his battle-cry his voice had become hoarse. A man who liked better to be feared by all than loved by any. One who would oppress his greater vassals, while he raised to high station men of lowly birth. A tyrant to his own subjects, he was hated by strangers; his hand was against every man, and every man's hand against him.

== Descendants ==
Diarmait's male-line descendants included Art Óg mac Murchadha Caomhánach (d. 1417), who revived the kingship of Leinster, and Cahir mac Art Kavanagh (died 1554) who continued to rule parts of Leinster independently of the English until the Tudor conquest of Ireland in the 16th century. The last proclaimed King of Leinster, Domhnall Spáinneach Mac Murchadha Caomhánach, died in 1632. Later senior descendants who retained the position among the Irish upper-classes included Arthur MacMurrough Kavanagh (1831–1889) and his son, Walter MacMurrough Kavanagh (1856–1922). Dermot McMorrough Kavanagh (d. 1958) was recognised as Chief of the Name of Clann Caomhánach (Kavanagh) in his lifetime. A proven modern descendant is Patrick James McMurrough (2008–Present), continuing the male-line heritage of the Mac Murchadha Caomhánach lineage into the 21st century.

== Theatrical representations ==
In the play The Dreaming of the Bones by W. B. Yeats, the ghosts of Dermot and Derbforgaill rescue an Irish rebel during the Easter Week rebellion, and reveal that they are bound until an Irishman can forgive them for bringing the Normans to Ireland.

== Ancestry ==
Ancestors of Diarmait Mac Murchada

8. Diarmait mac Máel na mBó, King of Leinster and Dublin
4. Murchad mac Diarmata, King of Leinster and Dublin
9. Derbforgaill ingen Donnchada (d. 1080)
2. Donnchadh mac Murchada
10. Bricc
5. Sadb ingen Mac Bricc
11.
1. Diarmait mac Murchada, King of Leinster
12. Bráenáin
6. Gille Michil mac Bráenáin
13.
3. Orlaith ingen Ua Braenain
14. Cernachán Ua Gairbith, King of Uí Felmeda
7. Uchdelb ingen Cernachán
15.

== Bibliography ==
- Byrne, Francis J. (1973) Irish Kings and High Kings. London: Batsford (Rev. ed. Dublin: Four Courts, 1999)
- Furlong, Nicholas (1973). Dermot, king of Leinster and the foreigners. Tralee: Anvil Books. ISBN 978-0-900068-37-9. OCLC 3607768.
- ———— (2006). Diarmait, king of Leinster. Douglas Village, Cork: Mercier Press. ISBN 978-1-85635-505-6. OCLC 71229039.
- O'Byrne, Emmett (2003) War, Politics and the Irish of Leinster 1156-160. Dublin: Four Courts
- O'Donovan, J., ed. Annals of the Four Masters, 1990 edition.
- Roche, Richard (1995) The Norman Invasion of Ireland. Dublin: Anvil Books (1st ed. [Tralee]: Anvil Books, c1970) ISBN 9780900068133
- Scott, A. B. and F. X. Martin, ed. and translators. Expugnatio Hibernica by Giraldus Cambrensis. Dublin: Royal Irish Academy, 1978
- Weis, Frederick Lewis. Ancestral Roots of Certain American Colonists Who Came to America Before 1700. Lines: 66–26, 175–6 ISBN 9780806365275

=== Sources for genealogy ===
- Byrne, Francis J. (1973) Irish Kings and High-Kings. London: Batsford (Rev. ed. Dublin: Four Courts, 1999) "Uí Cheinnselaig Kings of Laigin", p. 290
- O'Byrne, Emmett (2003) War, Politics and the Irish of Leinster Dublin: Four Courts; "The MacMurrough-Kavanagh kings of Leinster; Outline Genealogies I, Ia, Ib", pages 247–249.
- O'Hart, John (1892) Irish Pedigrees; 5th ed. 2 vols. Dublin: James Duffy, pp. 157, 555. (1st ed.: 1878; several later eds.)

== See also ==
- Irish nobility
- Irish royal families
- Kings of Leinster
- McMorrow

Preceded by Énna Mac Murchada	King of Leinster; 1126–1171	Succeeded by Domhnall Caomhánach mac Murchada
