= John R. Cavanaugh =

John Richard Cavanaugh (June 10, 1929 – July 26, 2007) was an American priest, teacher, and scholar.

He was born in Rochester, New York, the fourth child and second son of William Cavanaugh and Helen Louise (Kavanaugh) Cavanaugh.

After graduating from Aquinas Institute of Rochester in 1946, he entered seminary studies for the Congregation of St. Basil (The Basilians). He was ordained as a Roman Catholic priest in 1955. The following year he earned his Master's in English from the University of Toronto and then went on to teach English language and literature at the newly established St. John Fisher College in Rochester, which had been founded by the Basilians in 1948. He was a member of the English department from 1956 to 1994.

In 1959, he began doctoral studies at Saint Louis University. After completing his course work there, he returned to teaching at St. John Fisher College in 1962. He completed his doctoral dissertation in 1970. Both his Master's thesis and his doctoral dissertation were studies of certain features of St. Thomas More's writings.

In 1984, he took a yearlong sabbatical trip to Ireland. When he returned to Fisher as Chair of the English Department, he launched an Irish literature course and became active in recounting Ireland's history and countering stereotypes of the Irish people. To that end, he helped found the Rochester chapter of the Irish-American Culture Institute, a group that brings Irish artists and scholars to Rochester.

In addition to his teaching and scholarship, Cavanaugh enjoyed playing bagpipes, an activity he had to give up when he developed heart problems in 1980. He served on the board of trustees for Fisher and Aquinas Institute. In 2003, he established Fisher's first endowed chair, The William and Helen Chair of Catholic Studies, named in honor of his parents.

In 2000, he was named Distinguished Irish American of the Millennium Year at the sixth annual Rochester Irish Festival, and in 2001 he was the grand marshal of the St. Patrick's Day parade.

A bronze statue of Cavanaugh was erected on the east side of the Fisher campus in his honor.
