= Ballyhea =

Civil parish in County Cork, Ireland

Ballyhea Bealach Átha Ballyhay
- Civil parish
- Location in Ireland
- Coordinates: 52.32675°N 8.66707°W
- Country: Ireland
- Province: Munster
- County: County Cork
- Irish Grid Reference: R544177

Ballyhea or Ballyhay (Irish: Bealach Átha, meaning 'way of the ford') is a townland and civil parish in north County Cork, Ireland. Located near to the County Limerick border, the village of Ballyhea lies on the main N20 Cork–Limerick road, 3.5 km south of Charleville. It lies approximately 110 m above sea level.

== Area and etymology ==
Ballyhea covers a wide area and has five graveyards. These relate to the five parishes of Aglishdrinagh, Ardskeagh, Ballyhea (Ballyhay), Cooline, and Imprick which make up the broad area. It borders Newtownshandrum, Charleville, Ardpatrick, Effin, Churchtown, Liscarroll, Doneraile and Buttevant. Previously named as Ballyhaura in early 19th century publications such as the Union Gazetteer for Gt. Br. & Ireland.

Ballyhea means "place of Aodb or Aedh". Aodb had his residence in the 900s in the townland known as Lios Baile Aodb/Lisballyhea (circular stone homestead of Aodb). His clan was said to be one of the earliest to settle in the area.

== History ==
The main estate in the area was one of a group owned by the FitzGerald family. Known as "Castle Dodd" or "Castle Dod", the estate's main house incorporated the structure of an earlier castle, and became the home of the Harrison family from the mid-18th century. Becoming known as Castle Harrison, the house fell into disuse after the estate was acquired by the Irish Land Commission in 1956. Castle Harrison was subsequently demolished.

A Ballyhea man, called William Burke (brother of one of the accused) from Ballyhea, played a role in the Doneraile Conspiracy of 1829, by riding from Doneraile to Derrynane in County Kerry, to retain Daniel O’Connell as legal counsel. Willian Burke died on 7 April 1876, and was buried in Shandrum Cemetery, near Charleville.

Con O'Brien (1883-1946), known as Bard of Ballyhea, wrote numerous poems about Ballyhea, and the surrounding area. These were published in a 1981 book called The Poems of Con O'Brien the Bard of Ballyhea, published by Charleville (County Cork) Oriel Press.

== Religion ==
There is one Roman Catholic church, St. Mary's, and a relatively modern cemetery, linked to an older cemetery off the Limerick Road. There is an older Catholic church in the graveyard in Ballyhea (Ballyhay), built circa 1200 by the Norman family, the De Cogans. It ceased religious service circa 1800 and has fallen into ruin since then. In 1831, the population was judged to be 7,400 Catholics and 340 Protestants, with only 15 members belonging to the Church of England.

== Sport ==
Ballyhea GAA club was formed in 1884. The club has won County Championships in Senior, Intermediate, Junior and Juvenile hurling. In later years a Camogie Club was set up and three County Titles have been won by this club. The hurling team regraded to intermediate at the end of 2003. It took them until the 2015 season to return to senior.

== Transport ==
Ballyhea is on the main Limerick–Cork bus route with a stop near the parish church.

The nearby town of Charleville has a station on Cork-Dublin railway line (formerly the Great Southern Line).

== Amenities ==
Ballyhea has a series of marked mountain walk ways at Ballinboola and is part of the Ballyhoura Trail. There is a large artificial lake (40 acres), created by the extraction of gravel, with a range of wildlife; it is privately owned.

The greater Ballyhea area has a number of businesses, including a Lidl warehouse on the N20 at Pike Cross, and Dawn Meats at Ardnageehy.

Ballyhea Community Council, which evolved in the 1970s from a Munitir Na Tíre group, organises a number of activities locally, including an annual Christmas meal for the elderly of the parish. A group of parents also came together in 2000 to form the Ballyhea Pre-school Group.

== Bank bailout marches ==
Ballyhea residents were noted for their weekly marches, beginning in February 2011, in protest against taxpayer-funded bailouts of Irish banks. Activist Diarmuid O'Flynn was a spokesperson for the residents, and was involved in documenting bank bailout payments as they happened. The final march took place on 8 March 2020.

== See also ==
- List of towns and villages in Ireland
