= Walter FitzOther =

Anglo-Norman landowner

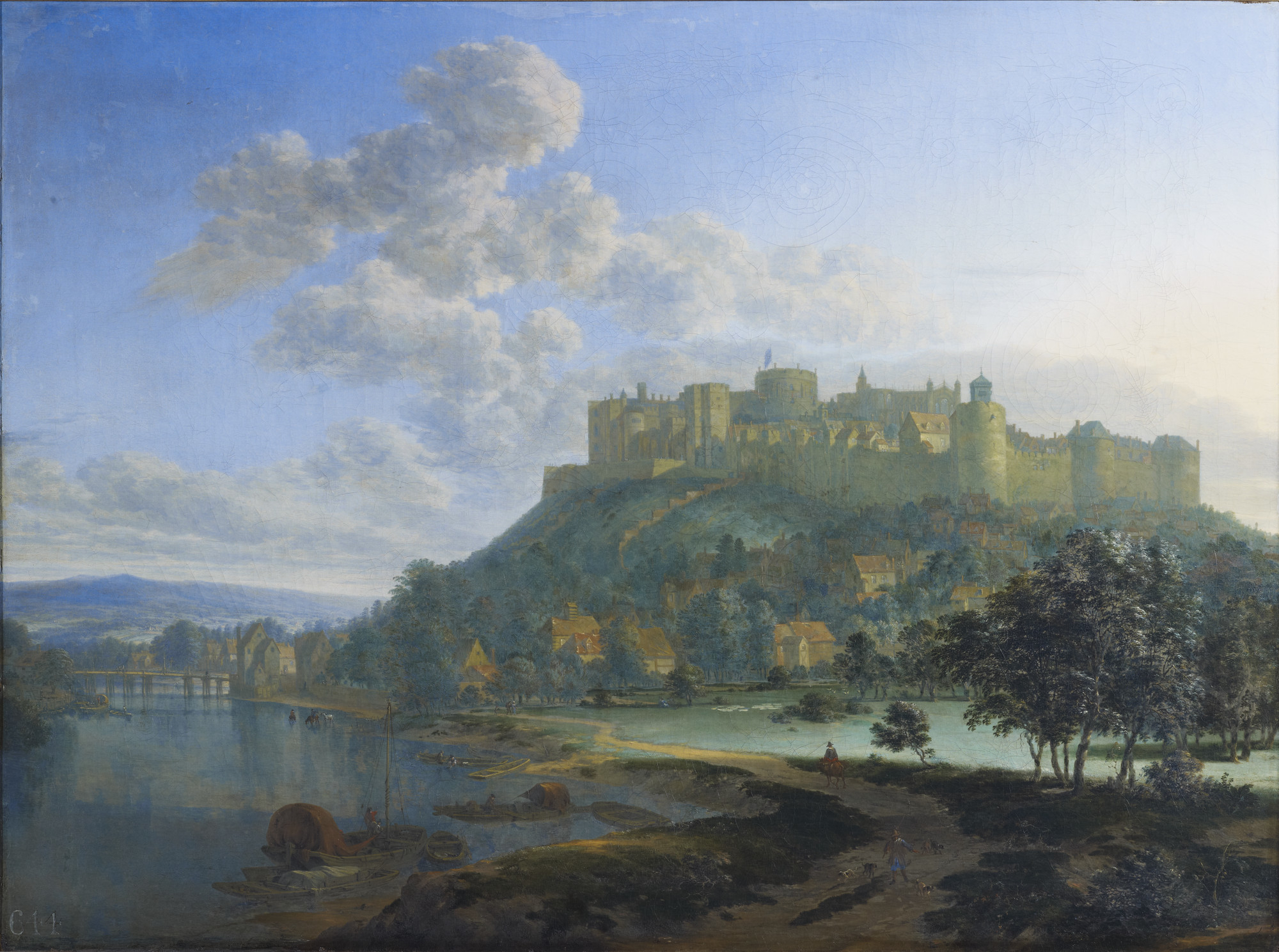
Johannes Vorstermans (c. 1643–1699^) – A View of Windsor Castle

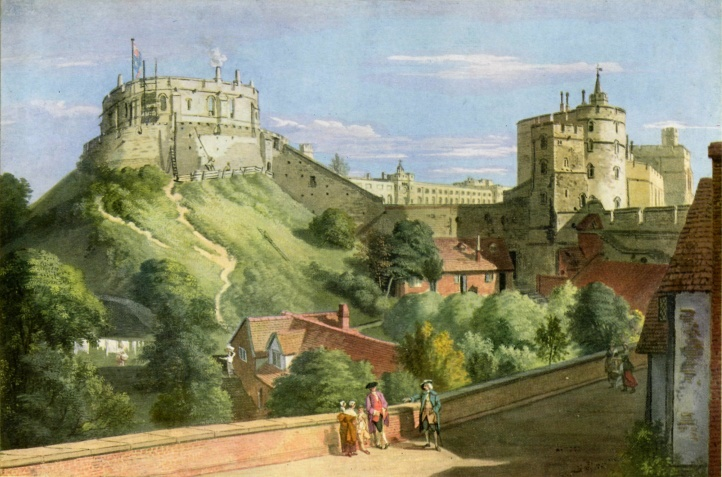
View of the Round and Devils Towers from the Black Rock

Walter FitzOther (fl. 1086; died after 1099) was a feudal baron of Eton in Buckinghamshire (now in Berkshire) and was the first Constable of Windsor Castle in Berkshire (directly across the River Thames from Eton), a principal royal residence of King William the Conqueror, and was a tenant-in-chief of that king of 21 manors in the counties of Berkshire, Buckinghamshire, Surrey, Hampshire and Middlesex, as well as holding a further 17 manors as a mesne tenant in the same counties.

== Marriage and children ==
He married Beatrice and had issue:

- William FitzWalter (died c. 1160), eldest son, 2nd feudal baron of Eton. His son was William de Windsor (died c. 1176), 3rd feudal baron of Eton, who adopted the surname de Windsor. The feudal barony of Eton soon split into moieties between two members of the family, William de Windsor (died 1215/16) and his cousin, Walter de Windsor (died 1203). Walter de Windsor died without children in 1203, when his two sisters became his co-heiresses. The other moiety continued in the descendants of William de Windsor until at least the time of Richard de Windsor, the son of Richard de Windsor (1258–1326).
- Robert FitzWalter, second son, inherited the nearby manor of Eton in Berkshire.
- Gerald de Windsor (c. 1075 – 1135), (alias Gerald FitzWalter), third son, the first castellan of Pembroke Castle in Pembrokeshire (formerly part of the Kingdom of Deheubarth), in Wales, who was in charge of the Norman forces in southwest Wales. He was the progenitor of the FitzGerald, FitzMaurice and De Barry dynasties of Ireland, who were elevated to the Peerage of Ireland in the 14th century and was also the ancestor of the prominent Carew family, of Moulsford in Berkshire, Carew Castle in Pembrokeshire (in the Kingdom of Deheubarth) and of Mohuns Ottery in Devon (see Baron Carew, Earl of Totnes and Carew baronets).

== Landholdings as tenant-in-chief ==
His landholdings as a tenant-in-chief as listed in the Domesday Book of 1086 were as follows (manor, hundred, county):

=== Buckinghamshire ===
- Eton, Stoke, Buckinghamshire, the probable caput of his feudal barony.
- Burnham, Burnham, Buckinghamshire
- Hardmead, Moulsoe, Buckinghamshire
- Horton, Stoke, Buckinghamshire

=== Berkshire ===
- [East and West] Hagbourne, Blewbury, Berkshire
- Bucklebury Manor, Bucklebury, Berkshire
- Kintbury, Kintbury, Berkshire
- Chilton, Nakedthorn, Berkshire
- Wokefield, Reading, Berkshire
- Ortone, Ripplesmere, Berkshire

=== Middlesex ===
- [East] Bedfont, Spelthorne, Middlesex
- Hatton, Spelthorne, Middlesex
- Stanwell, Spelthorne, Middlesex
- [West] Bedfont, Spelthorne, Middlesex

=== Surrey ===
- Compton, Godalming, Surrey
- Hurtmore, Godalming, Surrey
- Peper Harrow, Godalming, Surrey
- Kingston [upon Thames], Kingston, Surrey
- [West] Horsley, Woking, Surrey

=== Hampshire ===
- Malshanger, Chuteley, Hampshire
- Will Hall, Neatham, Hampshire

== Landholdings as mesne tenant ==
His landholdings as a mesne tenant as listed in the Domesday Book of 1086 were as follows:

=== Buckinghamshire ===
- Burnham, Burnham, Buckinghamshire
- Eton, Stoke, Buckinghamshire
- Horton, Stoke, Buckinghamshire

=== Berkshire ===
- [East and West] Hagbourne, Blewbury, Berkshire
- Kintbury, Kintbury, Berkshire
- Chilton, Nakedthorn, Berkshire
- Ortone, Ripplesmere, Berkshire
- Windsor, Ripplesmere, Surrey / Berkshire / Buckinghamshire
- Wallingford, Slotisford, Berkshire / Oxfordshire

=== Middlesex ===
- Stanwell, Spelthorne, Middlesex

=== Surrey ===
- Compton, Godalming, Surrey
- Kingston [upon Thames], Kingston, Surrey
- [West] Horsley, Woking, Surrey
- Woking, Woking, Surrey

=== Hampshire ===
- Malshanger, Chuteley, Hampshire
- Will Hall, Neatham, Hampshire
- Winchfield, Odiham, Hampshire
