= Gerald de Windsor =

Cambro-Norman nobleman

- Castellan of Pembroke Castle
- Born: c.1075
- Died: 1116
- Noble family: FitzGerald dynasty
- Spouse: Nest ferch Rhys
- Issue: William FitzGerald; Maurice FitzGerald; David FitzGerald; Angharad; Gwladys
- Father: Walter FitzOther
- Mother: Beatrice

Gerald de Windsor (c.1075 – 1116), alias Gerald FitzWalter, was a Cymro-Norman lord who was the first Castellan of Pembroke Castle in Pembrokeshire (formerly part of the Kingdom of Deheubarth). Son of the first Norman-French Constable of Windsor Castle, and married to a Welsh Princess, he was in charge of the Norman forces in south-west Wales. He was also steward and governor for the Norman magnate Arnulf de Montgomery.

His descendants were the FitzGerald dynasty, as well as the FitzMaurice, De Barry, and Keating dynasties of Ireland, who were elevated to the Peerage of Ireland in the 14th century. He was also the ancestor of the prominent Carew family, of Moulsford in Berkshire, the owners of Carew Castle in Pembrokeshire (in the Kingdom of Deheubarth) and of Mohuns Ottery in Devon (see Baron Carew, Earl of Totnes and Carew baronets).

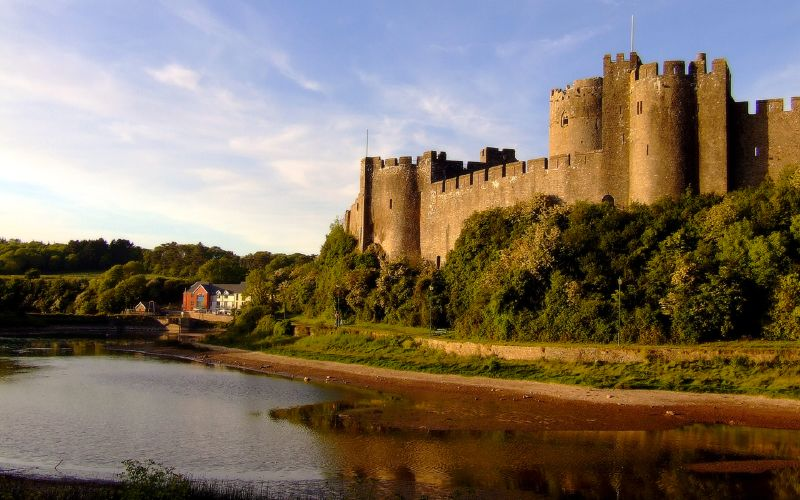
Pembroke Castle today. The original castle, of which no above-ground trace remains, was built by Arnulf of Montgomery (c.1066 – 1118/22), the Anglo-Norman conqueror of South Wales and contemporary of Gerald de Windsor

== Origins ==
=== Father ===
Gerald may have been born at Windsor Castle in Berkshire, then a strategically placed motte-and-bailey royal fortress and a principal royal residence, hence his sobriquet "de Windsor", although may have simply taken the name of the family seat as per tradition demonstrated by the de Barris of south Wales . He was a younger son of Walter FitzOther (fl.1086; died after 1099), feudal baron of Eton in Buckinghamshire (now in Berkshire) who was the first Constable of Windsor Castle in Berkshire (directly across the River Thames from Eton), a principal royal residence of King William the Conqueror, and was a tenant-in-chief of that king of 21 manors in the counties of Berkshire, Buckinghamshire, Surrey, Hampshire and Middlesex, as well as holding a further 17 manors as a mesne tenant in the same counties.

Walter FitzOther, as his surname Fitz asserts, was the son of Otto Gherardini (Latinized to Otheus), who had been Constable of Windsor Castle during the reign of King Edward the Confessor (r. 1042–1066). Walter FitzOther became a follower of the Norman invader King William the Conqueror (r. 1066–1087), who appointed him as his first castellan of Windsor Castle and Keeper of the Forest of Windsor, an important royal hunting ground.

Upon his father's death after 1100, Gerald's oldest brother William inherited the office of Constable of Windsor Castle; his second-oldest brother Robert inherited the nearby manor of Eton in Berkshire. Gerald's family was one of the "service families" on whom King William the Conqueror relied for his survival.

=== Mother and siblings ===
Gerald's mother was named Beatrice. Gerald had three known siblings: William, Robert, and Maurice.

== Career ==
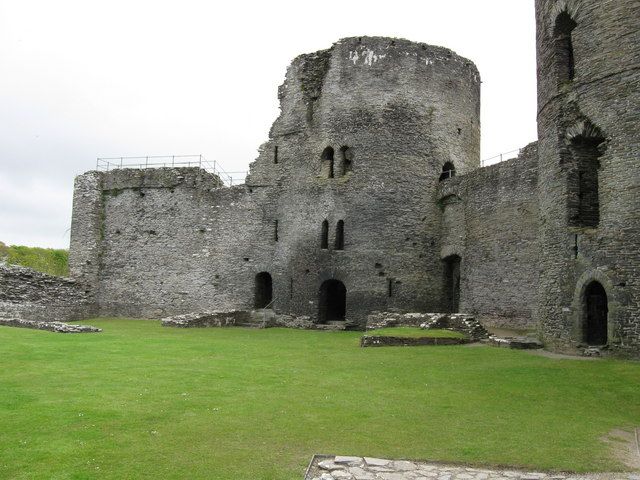
Cilgerran Castle, the possible site of Princess Nest's abduction. The first castle on this site is thought to have been built by Gerald of Windsor during the 12th century

The death in battle of Gerald's father-in-law, Rhys ap Tewdwr, Prince of Wales, and the last king of Deheubarth in Wales ("last king of the Britons"), was the opportunity for a general Norman invasion of South Wales during which Arnulf de Montgomery, youngest son of the powerful Roger de Montgomerie, 1st Earl of Shrewsbury, swept out from Shrewsbury and ravaged south into Dyfed, where he built Pembroke Castle, in the form of a rudimentary fortress later described by Giraldus Cambrensis (c.1146 – c.1223) (Gerald's grandson) as a "slender fortress of turf and stakes. When he went back to England, Arnulf left the fortress and a small garrison in the charge of Gerald of Windsor, a stalwart, cunning man, his constable and lieutenant". The first Pembroke Castle was not very strong and offered little resistance.

In 1096, two or three years after the establishment of Norman Pembrokeshire, a general uprising occurred in Wales against the Norman invasion during which Gerald's defence of Pembroke Castle excited the admiration of his contemporaries, all the more for his unique stratagems during the desperate stance. While fortress after fortress fell to the Welsh onslaught, Pembroke Castle held out, despite the rigours of a lengthy siege by Uchtryd ab Edwin and Hywel ap Goronwy, which greatly reduced Gerald's forces. Fifteen of Gerald's knights deserted at night and left by boat, on the discovery of which Gerald confiscated their estates and re-granted them to the deserters' followers whom he created knights. Giraldus Cambrensis described the events as follows:

When they had hardly any provisions left, Gerald, who, as I have said, was a cunning man, created the impression that they were still well supplied and were expecting reinforcement at any moment. He took four hogs, which was about all they had, cut them into sections, and hurled them off over the palisades at the besiegers. The following day he thought of an even more ingenious strategism. He signed a letter with his own seal and had it placed just outside the lodgings of Wilfred, Bishop of St David's, who chanced to be in the neighbourhood. There it would be picked up almost immediately and the finder would imagine that it had been dropped accidentally by one of Gerald's messengers. The purport of the letter was that Gerald would have no need of reinforcements from Arnulf for a good four months. When this despatch was read to the Welsh, they immediately abandoned the siege and went off home.

In 1094(?) in recognition of Gerald's successful defence of Pembroke, King William II rewarded Arnulf, Gerald's overlord, with the lordship of Demetia, and created him Earl of Pembroke.

In 1102, before the revolt of the Montgomery faction against King Henry I (r. 1100–1135), Gerald went to Ireland, where he negotiated the marriage of his overlord Arnulf de Montgomery with Lafracoth, daughter of the Irish king Muircheartach Ua Briain, King of Munster.

Gerald de Windsor held the office of Constable of Pembroke Castle from 1102. In 1108 Gerald built the castle of Little Cenarth (Cenarth Bychan) which is probably Cilgerran Castle.

== Landholdings ==
Gerald received the manor of Moulsford then in Berkshire (since 1974 in Oxfordshire), by grant of King Henry I. Moulsford descended to the Carew family of Carew Castle in Pembrokeshire, descended from Odo de Carrio, a son of William FitzGerald, son of Gerald de Windsor.

== Marriage and progeny ==
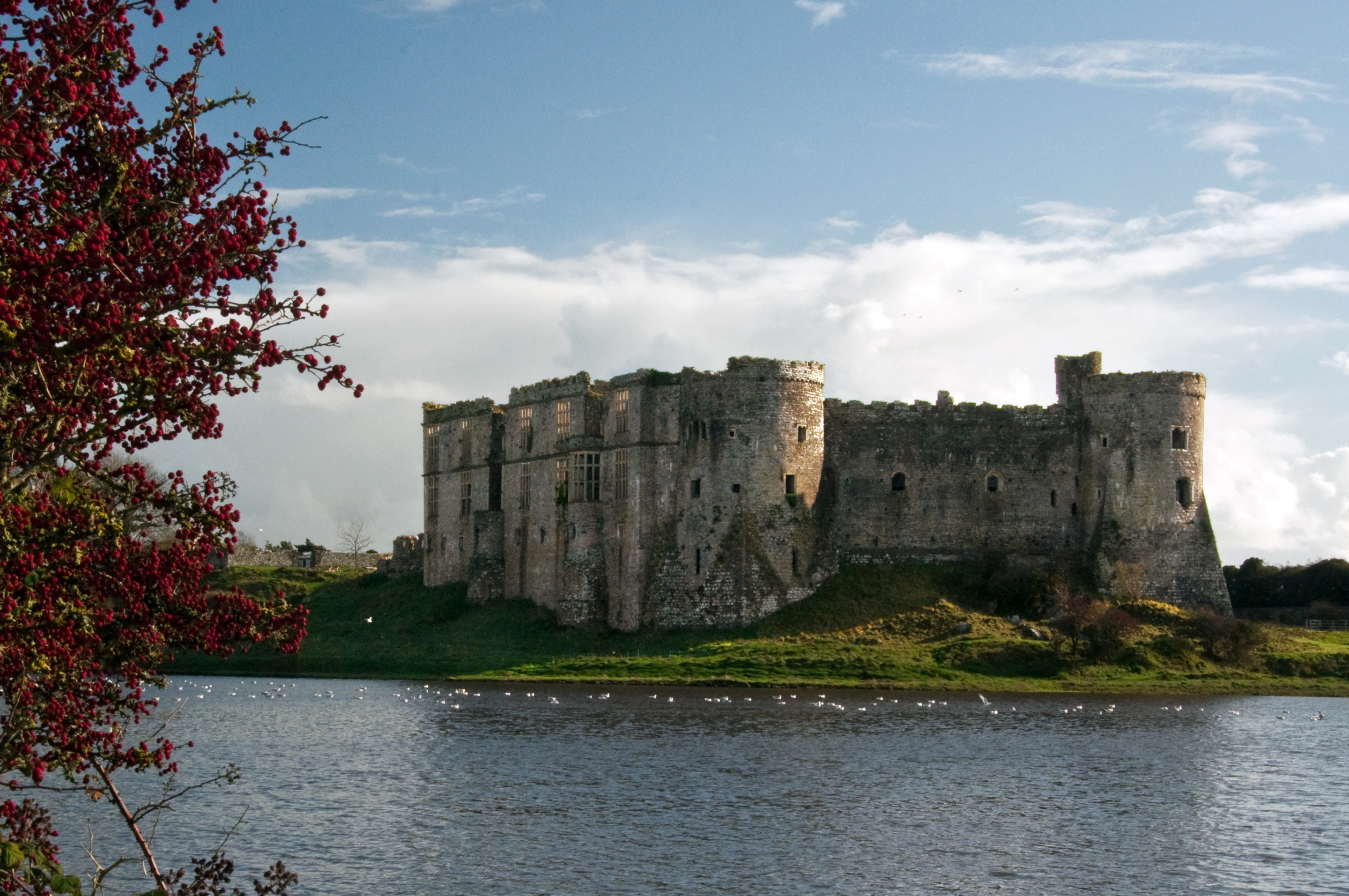
Carew Castle, estate part of Princess Nest dowry, castle built by Gerald of Windsor

Gerald married Nest ferch Rhys ("Nesta") a Welsh princess, daughter of Rhys ap Tewdwr, the last king of Deheubarth in Wales. Nest brought the manor of Carew as part of her dowry, and Gerald cleared the existing fort to build his own castle along Norman lines. They had five children:

- William FitzGerald, Lord of Carew and Emlyn
- Maurice FitzGerald, Lord of Llanstephan
- David FitzGerald, Bishop of St David's
- Angharad
- Gwladys

In 1109 his wife Nest was abducted by her second cousin Owain ap Cadwgan. According to the Brut y Tywysogion, Owain and his men entered the couple's home (assumed by historians to have been either Cilgerran Castle or Little Cenarch) and set fire to the buildings. When Gerald was awoken by the noise, Nest urged him to escape by climbing out through the drain-hole of the garderobe. Owain then seized Nest and her children and carried her off. Some sources, however, suggest that she went with him willingly.

Gerald's influence was such that due to Nest's abduction Owain and his father soon lost much of their territory of Powys. Owain himself was obliged to go into exile in Ireland and when he returned in 1116, he was killed when his retinue of fifty men at arms was cunningly attacked by Gerald and his large cohort as they both traveled to aid the king of England.

Gerald's son William had a daughter named Isabella Le Gros, who married William De Haya Walensis, by whom she had sons David Walensis and Philip Walensis. David and Philip were surnamed in Latin Walensis ("of Wales"), and were the founders of the widespread family surnamed Welsh or Walsh or Wallace. Philip Walensis had a son named Howell of Welsh Walensis.

Nest is the female progenitor of the Fitzgerald Dynasty, and through her the Fitzgeralds are related to Welsh royalty and to the Tudors (Tewdwrs). The Tudors are descended from Nest's father Rhys ap Tewdwr (Anglicized to "Tudor"). Henry Tudor, King of England, was a patrilineal descendant of Rhys ap Tewdwr. Consequently, Gerald and Nest's offspring, the Fitzgeralds, are distant cousins to the English Tudors.

== Death ==
The Annals of Cambria record the date of Owain's death as 1116. As Gerald de Windsor makes no further appearance to that date in the "Annals" or in the "Chronicles of the Princes", the presumption is that he did not long survive his enemy, Owain ab Cadwgan, and that the Earl of Kildare's Addenda is erroneous in putting his death as late as 1135.
