= Castle Harrison =

Great house in County Cork, Ireland

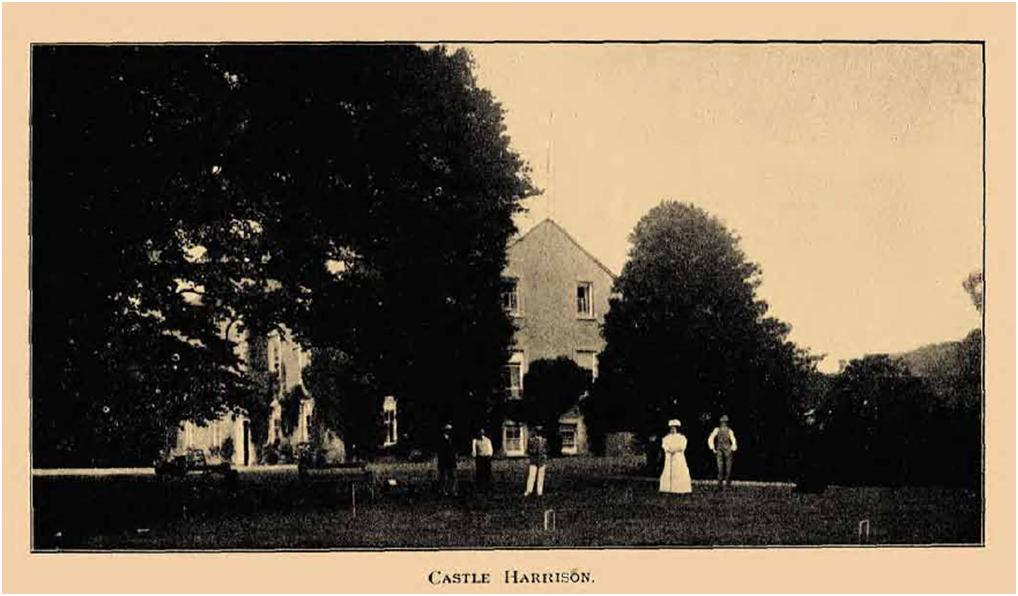
- Castle Harrison in late-19th/early-20th century
- Interactive map of the Castle Harrison area
- Former names: Castle Dodd

General information
- Status: Demolished
- Type: Country estate house
- Location: Ballyhea, County Cork^{[a]}, Ireland
- Coordinates: 52.32630°N 8.65718°W
- Demolished: 1950s
- Owner: Harrison family
- The building appears on Ordnance Survey 1" map series in the 1st, 2nd and revision versions, as well as the Ordnance Survey First Edition 6" Series [1836 to 1846], and on the Ordnance Survey 1:50,000 series on sheet #73, grid R, grid ref 552196

Castle Harrison, formerly Castle Dodd, was a great house close to Ballyhea and Charleville, in north County Cork, Ireland. The seat of the Harrison family for some time, the house was demolished in the 1950s.

== History ==
A "Castle Dodd" (or Dod), of the Fitzgerald family, appears on a 1736 map of north County Cork. Samuel Lewis' Topographical Dictionary Ireland suggests that Castle Harrison was developed from or on the site of this earlier structure, and by 1837 was occupied by a man named Standish Harrison.

By the 1940s the Irish Tourist Association Survey noted that Castle Harrison was the residence of a Mrs. Harrison, widow of a General Harrison. This survey provides a description of the great hall which contained artefacts unearthed on the estate during the construction of a nearby railway line. Castle Harrison was inherited by five sisters in 1951 and the estate sold to the Irish Land Commission in 1956. The house was subsequently demolished.

== Harrison family ==
The Harrison's posted a parchment at the entrance to Castle Harrison which described the Harrison lineage: The original parchment is in the possession of Jeffrey Standish Harrison, Sr. of Woodinville, Wa.

Who originally Descended of Richard, Lord Harrisson, who came into England A.D. 1056, Deriving his Pedigree from Charles, Junior Son of Charles, Duke of Habspruch, in Germany 876, as Sir Thomas Hawley, who was King-at-Arms of George Bretain in the Reign of King Henry VIII, can give Account, Transcripts of which have been carefully Preserved and to me Lineally transmitted by my Ancestors, who were successively Chief Antiquaries of Ireland.

Therefore I, Charles Lynegar, having said Transcripts, or True Copies thereof, have from thence drawn out the following Antiquity, of the Honourable William Harrison, Esquire, as a Memorial to his Posterity; his Genealogy Extracted from the Root whence Spring his Honourable and Ancient Ancestors. Given under my Hand, Trinity College, Dublin. Second day of August 1727. From your most Obedeint Servant, Charles Lynegar

The Castle Harrison vault in Aglishdrinagh Churchyard was built by Henry Harrison, of Castle Harrison, who was known as the 'Commissioner'. He was Commissioner of Customs in Ireland about 1710.
