= David FitzGerald =

12th-century Bishop of St David's

David FitzGerald (sometimes David Fitz Gerald or David fitz Gerald; c. 1106 – 8 May 1176) was a medieval Bishop of St David's in Wales.

== Early life ==
FitzGerald was the son of Gerald of Windsor and Nest, daughter of Rhys ap Tewdwr, and was probably born between 1103 and 1109. His sister Angharad married William de Barri and was the mother of Gerald of Wales. The eldest brother was William, the Lord of Carew, and a younger brother was Maurice. Some half-brothers held lands in Wales, including Robert Fitz-Stephen, who later secured fitzGerald's help in getting released from captivity.

== Bishop ==
FitzGerald was a canon of the cathedral chapter of St David's Cathedral and Archdeacon of Cardigan before he was elected to the bishopric of St Davids on 14 December 1148. The cathedral chapter was divided over whom to elect, and the circumstances for the dissension are a bit murky, as two different reasons are recorded. Gerald of Wales stated that the dispute over the election arose because part of the chapter wished to elect a Welshman yet others opposed this desire. Another story for the dispute has one faction of the chapter favouring the continuation of St David's attempt to be elevated to the status of an archbishopric, an effort that was opposed by the other faction. However the sides came to be, the chapter sent a delegation to Canterbury where Theobald of Bec, the Archbishop of Canterbury, secured the election for fitzGerald. His election was a victory for the local Welsh interests by securing the election of someone who had close ties to the bishopric to the episcopal seat. FitzGerald did promise, however, to abandon the efforts of his predecessors in the see to have St David's elevated to an archbishopric.

FitzGerald was consecrated on 19 December 1148 at Canterbury Cathedral by Theobald of Bec. Theobald also consecrated Robert de Chesney as Bishop of Lincoln at the same time. Also present at the consecration was Patrick, the Bishop of Limerick. His profession of obedience to Canterbury survives, and differs from others of the same time frame in the longer length as well as the form that it took. Theobald's securing of the promise to no longer seek the elevation of St David's was a sign of the archbishop's victory over the separatist tendencies in the Welsh church.

During fitzGerald's episcopate, he took part in the coronation of Henry the Young King in 1170. Besides this, fitzGerald took little part in political affairs, with the main exception being his efforts in 1167 to secure his half-brother's release from the custody of Rhys ap Gruffudd. He was also present at the royal council at Clarendon in 1164. In episcopal affairs, FitzGerald appears to have spent most of his time on local affairs, only helping with the consecration of one other bishop – when in 1162 he took part in the consecration of Thomas Becket as Archbishop of Canterbury. He attended the Council of Westminster in 1175. One of fitzGerald's problems was that his diocese was quite poor and suffered from plundering by local magnates. FitzGerald also used the lands of the bishopric to endow his family with lands and offices.

== Death and legacy ==
FitzGerald died on 8 May 1176, (Note: Although the Fasti Ecclesiae Anglicanae only states that he died before 9 May 1176.) and was buried in his cathedral. FitzGerald took his nephew Gerald into his household and arranged for his education. Besides his nephew, fitzGerald also had at least one son and several daughters, whom he provided for out of the lands of St David's. His son, Miles, became a member of one of the Norman invasions of Ireland, and was formally acknowledged as the bishop's son.
