= FitzGerald dynasty =

Cambro-Norman, later Hiberno-Norman dynasty, holding power in Ireland over centuries

FitzGerald Mac Gearailt
- Argent a saltire gules
- Parent house: House of Gherardini
- Etymology: "Son of Gerald"
- Origin: Ireland and Great Britain
- Founded: 1075; 951 years ago
- Founder: Gerald de Windsor
- Current head: Maurice FitzGerald, 9th Duke of Leinster
- Titles: Viceroy of Ireland, Canada, and India (non-hereditary); Duke of Leinster; Marquess of Kildare; Marquess of Lansdowne; Marcher Lord; Earl Palatine; Earl of Desmond; Earl of Kerry; Earl of Kildare; Earl of Offaly; Earl of Shelburne; Earl of Wycombe; Earl of Orkney; Viscount Leinster; Viscount Feilding; Viscount Callan; Viscount Clanmaurice; Viscount Fitzmaurice; Viscount Calne and Calstone; Viscount Kilmaule; Viscount of Kirkwall; Viscount FitzGibbon; Baron Desmond; Baron Kildare; Baron Offaly; Baron Kerry; Baron Odorney; Baron Feilding of Newnham Paddox; Baron St Liz; Baron Fielding of Lecaghe; Baron of Kerry and Lixnaw; Baron Dunkeron; Baron Wycombe of Chipping Wycombe; Baron Lecale; Baron de Ros; Baron FitzMaurice; Baron FitzGerald; Baron FitzGerald and Vesey; Baron FitzGibbon of Lower Connello; Baron FitzGibbon of Sidbury; Baron of Enisnag; Baron of Burnchurch; Baronet of Clenlish; Baronet of Newmarket on Fergus; Baronet of Valentia; Baronet of Geraldine Place; Black Knight; Green Knight; White Knight; Lord Dechmont; Lord of Cilgerran; Lord of Decies; Lord of Offaly; Lord of Maynooth; Lord of Naas; Lord of Llanstephan; Lord OConnello; Lord of Kiltrany; Lord of Carew; Lord of Emlyn
- Connected families: Dinefwr; de Montgomery; Stuart; Grey; de Vere; Leveson-Gower; Howard; Villiers; DeBarry; Rohan-Chabot; Butler; Guinness; Kennedy; Astor; Keating
- Motto: Crom A Boo ("Crom Forever")
- Estates: Cilgerran Castle; Maynooth Castle; Carton House; Adare Manor; Lismore Castle; Leinster House; Carew Castle; Cliveden House; Lansdowne House; Bowood House; Kilkea Castle; Johnstown Castle; Oakley Court; Newnham Paddox House; Lleweni Hall; Waterford Castle; Ardfert Abbey; Askeaton Abbey; Llansteffan Castle; Listowel Castle; Glin Castle; Ashdown House; Frescati House; Derreen House; Castle Dodd; Desmond Hall and Castle; Croom Castle; Rahinnane Castle; Woodstock Castle; Ardglass Castle; Desmond Castle; Desmond Castle of Adare; Desmond Castle of Askeaton; Shanid Castle; Lea Castle; Sligo Castle; White's Castle; Donadea Castle; Leigh House; Geashill Castle; Black Castle; Castle Matrix; Gowran Castle; Carrigafoyle Castle; Ballinruddery Castle; Morett Castle; Clonamery Castle; Brownsford Castle; Ballyseede Castle
- Cadet branches: House of Kildare; House of Desmond; House of Leinster

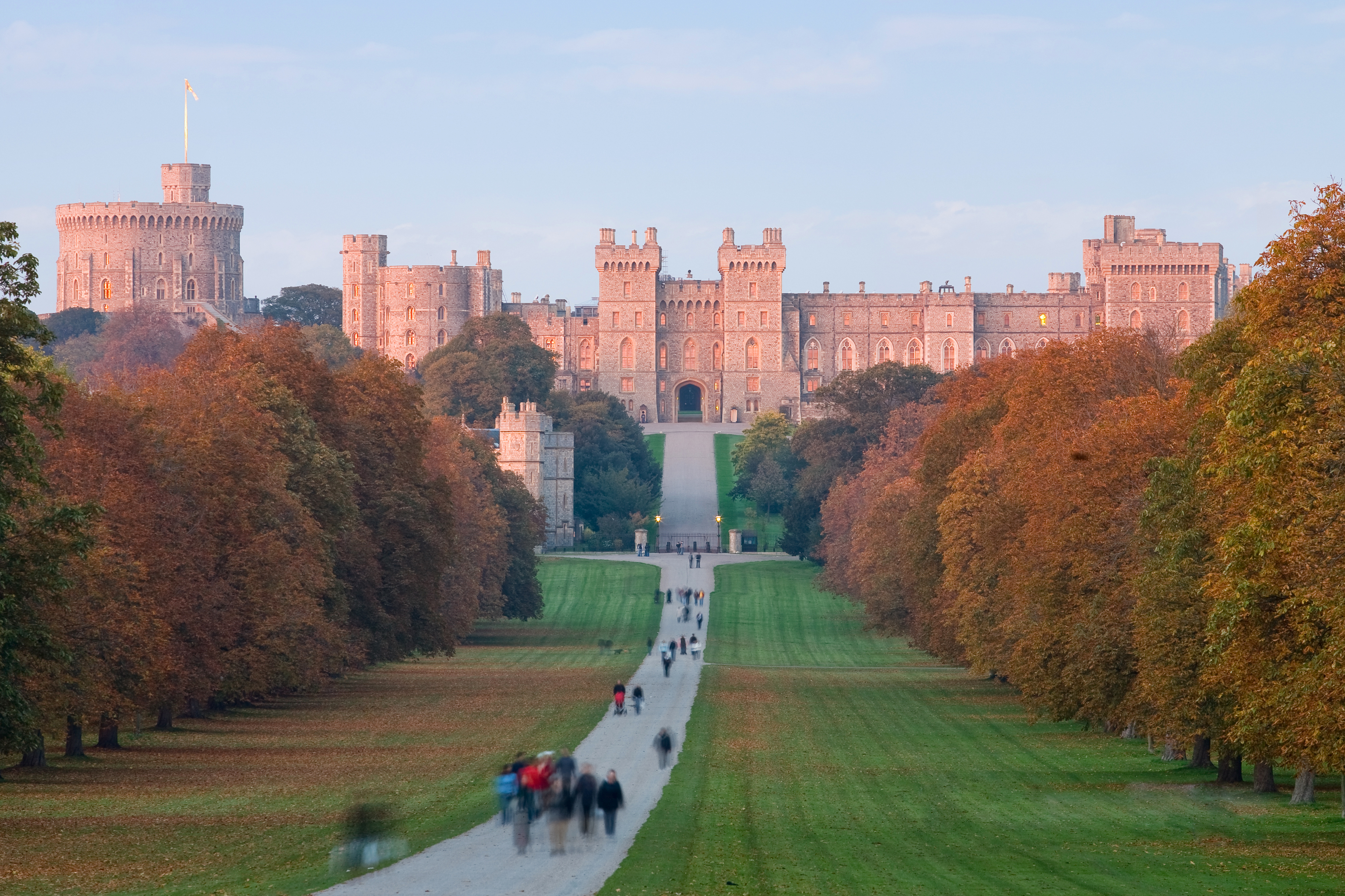
Windsor Castle, a residence of William the Conqueror first held by Gerald de Windsor's father and brother

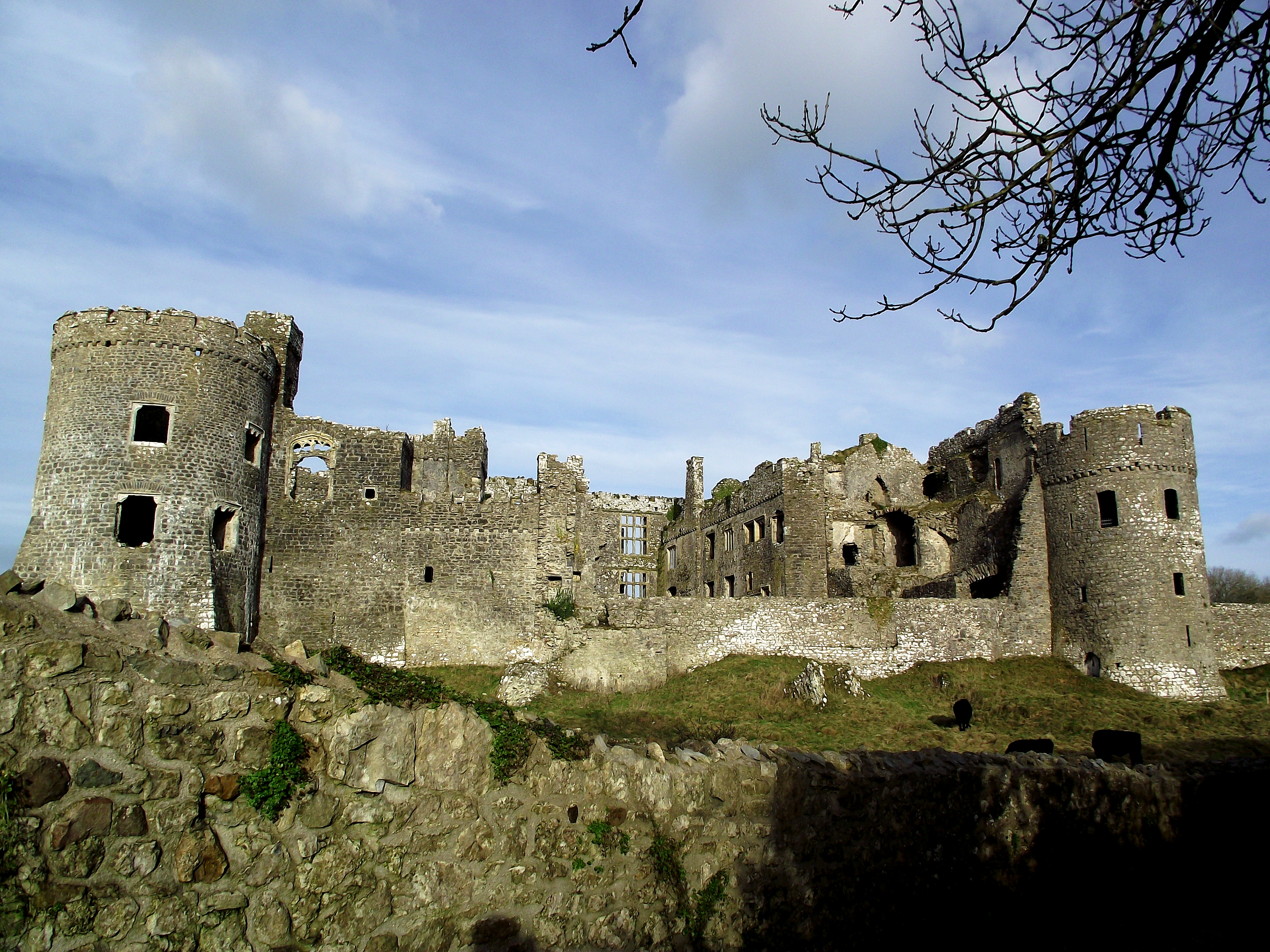
Carew Castle, initially built by Gerald de Windsor, estate part of Princess Nest dowry

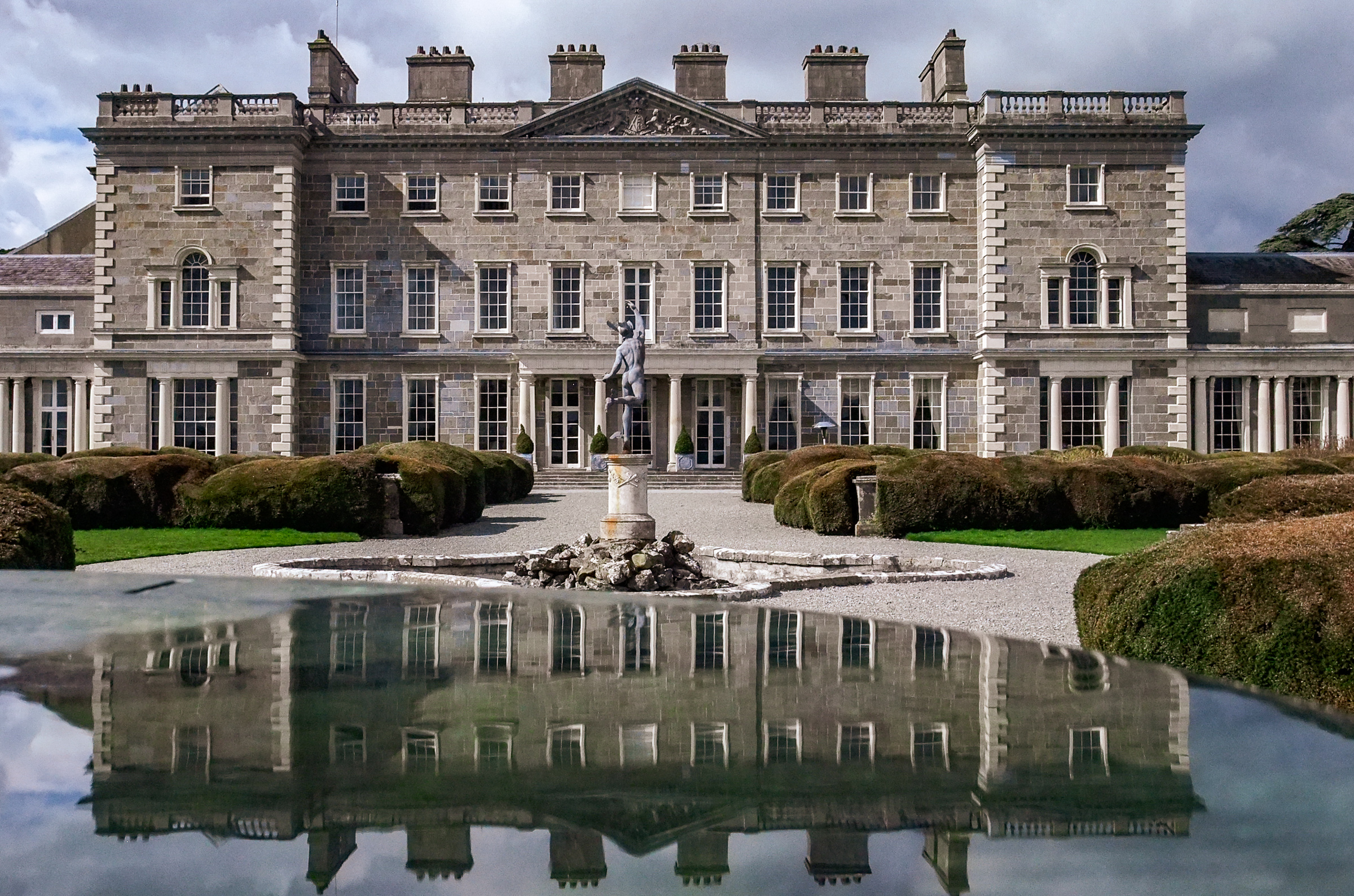
Carton House was the ancestral seat for over 700 years of the Dukes of Leinster

FitzGerald (Irish: Mac Gearailt) is a Hiberno-Norman noble and aristocratic dynasty, originally of Cambro-Norman and Anglo-Norman origin. They have been peers of Ireland since at least the 13th century. The dynasty has also been referred to as the Geraldines and Ireland's largest landowners. They achieved power through the conquest and colonisation of large swathes of Irish territory by the sons and grandsons of Gerald de Windsor (also called Gerald FitzWalter, c. 1075 – 1135), the first Castellan of Pembroke Castle in Wales and progenitor of the FitzMaurice and FitzGerald dynasties. The family name means "sons of Gerald", with "fitz" from Anglo-Norman fils "son".

Gerald de Windsor's father, Baron Walter FitzOther, was the first Constable and Governor of Windsor Castle for William the Conqueror, and was the Lord of 38 manors in England, making the FitzGeralds one of the "service families", the King's strongest military supporters. Some members of the family became the Black Knights, Green Knights and White Knights.

The main branches of the family are:

- The FitzMaurices and FitzGeralds of Kildare (Earls of Kildare from 1316, later Marquesses of Kildare and from 1766 Dukes of Leinster and Premier Peers of Ireland). The current head is Maurice FitzGerald, 9th Duke of Leinster.
- The Fitzmaurices and FitzGeralds of Desmond (Barons Desmond, later Earls of Desmond).

== Overview ==
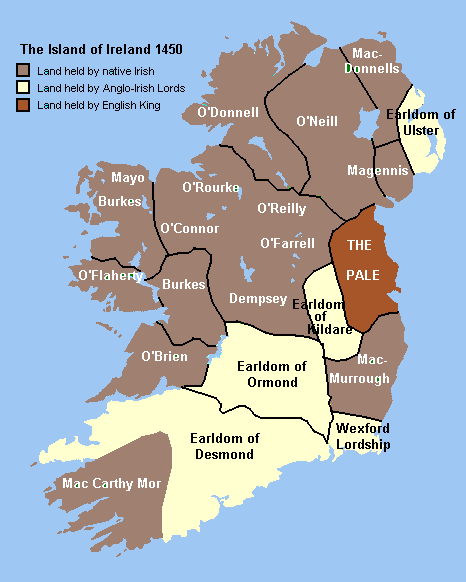
Ireland in 1450, showing the Geraldine earldoms of Kildare and Desmond

The progenitor of the Irish FitzGerald dynasty was a Cambro-Norman Marcher Lord named Maurice FitzGerald, Lord of Lanstephan, son of Gerald de Windsor and Princess Nest ferch Rhys, of the Welsh royal House of Dinefwr. Maurice married a daughter of the Norman magnate Arnulf de Montgomery: the Montgomeries, lords of 150 manors and 30 castles, were the most powerful magnates in both England and Normandy, and were of the same family as William the Conqueror. His wife's maternal grandfather was the High King of Ireland, Muirchertach Ua Briain (see Arnulf de Montgomery) which may have influenced the important role Maurice played the 1169 Norman invasion of Ireland.

The FitzGeralds claim kinship with the Tudors who descended from the same Welsh royal line as Princess Nest's father, Rhys ap Tewdwr, King of Deheubarth. Consequently, the FitzMaurices and FitzGeralds are cousins to the Tudors (Tewdwrs in Welsh) through Princess Nest and her Welsh family.

In his poetry, Henry Howard, Earl of Surrey, a cousin of Anne Boleyn, also referred to Countess Elizabeth FitzGerald, (1527–89) as "Fair Geraldine", alluding to her family's Italian ancestry through the Gherardinis of Florence. The FitzGerald dynasty has played a major role in Irish history. Gearóid Mór, 8th Earl of Kildare and his son Gearóid Óg, 9th Earl of Kildare, were Lord Deputy of Ireland in the late-fifteenth and early-sixteenth centuries respectively. Both married to cousins of Henry Tudor, first monarch of the House of Tudor.

During the Italian War of 1521–1526, James FitzGerald, 10th Earl of Desmond, conspired with the Venetians and King Francis I of France, of Château de Chambord, against the Habsburgs, Tudors and Medicis. After the war, he sided once again against England, and allied himself with Charles V, Holy Roman Emperor during the War of the League of Cognac. Another notable rebel was Commander James FitzMaurice FitzGerald, who led the Desmond Rebellions against the Tudors, and negotiated with Catherine de' Medici with the ambition of making her son, Henry III of France, the new King of Ireland. Gerald FitzGerald, 14th Earl of Desmond led the Second Desmond Rebellion with the help of the King of Spain, Philip of Habsburg, and Pope Gregory XIII, in an attempt to put on the throne Duke Giacomo Boncompagni.

Thomas FitzGerald, 10th Earl of Kildare (died 1537), known as "Silken Thomas," also led an unsuccessful insurrection in Ireland, while Lord Edward FitzGerald (1763–1798), the fifth son of the first duke of Leinster, was a leading figure in the 1798 Irish Rebellion against King George III of the House of Hanover. Thomas's half-brother, the 11th Earl, nicknamed the "Wizard Earl", went into exile in Italy, joined the Geraldine League, and became a member of the household of the Duke of Mantua, of the Gonzaga family, and Master of Horse to Cosimo I de' Medici, Grand Duke of Tuscany.

In Irish history, an example of the FitzGerald dynasty becoming "more Irish than the Irish themselves" is Gerald FitzGerald, 3rd Earl of Desmond (1335–1398), who was also known by the Irish Gaelic Gearóid Iarla (Earl Gerald). Although made Lord Chief Justice of Ireland in 1367, Gerald wrote poetry in the Irish language, most famously the poem Mairg adeir olc ris na mnáibh ("Woe to Those who Speak Ill of Womankind"). Indeed, although an accomplished poet in Norman French, Gerald was instrumental in the move by the Fitzmaurices and Fitzgeralds of Desmond toward greater use of the Irish language.

=== Modern times ===
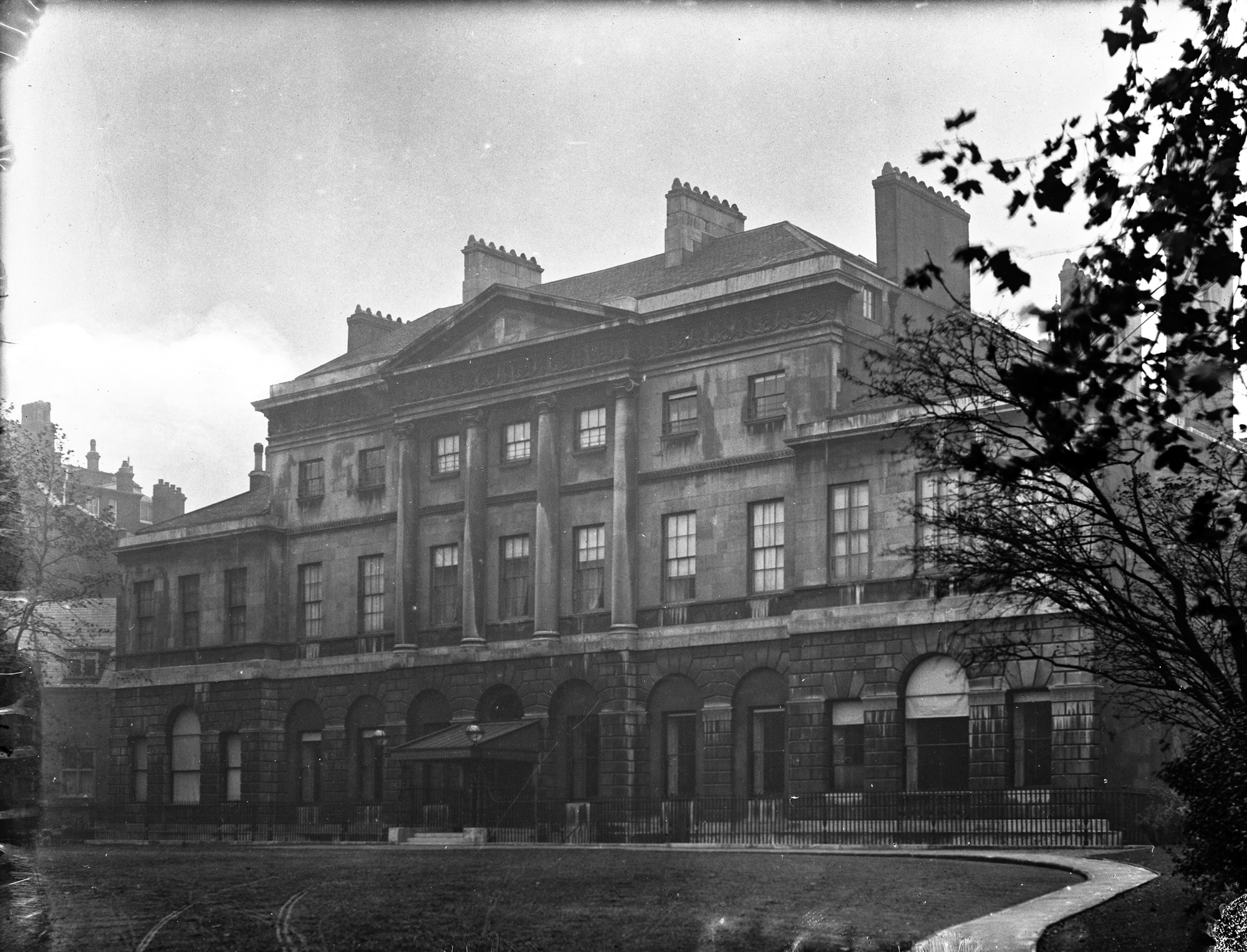
Lansdowne House, London seat of the Marquess of Lansdowne, was later occupied by William Waldorf Astor, and Hannah de Rothschild of Mentmore Towers. It was also the location of the draft of the Treaty of Paris, which gave independence to the United States.

Many members of the Fitzmaurices also became notable over the centuries, such as William Petty Fitzmaurice, 1st Marquess of Lansdowne, the Prime Minister of Britain who negotiated with Benjamin Franklin and secured peace with America at the end of the American War of Independence, or Henry Petty-Fitzmaurice, 5th Marquess of Lansdowne, Viceroy of Canada and India, who became a half-nephew of Emperor Napoleon III, a step-grandson of Queen Hortense Bonaparte, and a great-grandson of Talleyrand, connecting the family with the Houses of Beauharnais, Talleyrand, and Bonaparte. The Treaty of Paris (1783), that gave the independence to the United States was drafted from William's home at Lansdowne House, and Henry was made a member of the prominent Brooks's Club, alongside the 8th Duke of Devonshire of Chatsworth House, Prime Minister Lord Rosebery of Mentmore Towers, and Baron Lionel de Rothschild, grandson of Mayer Amschel, founder of the House of Rothschild.

The present-day seat of the Irish Parliament Dáil Éireann is housed in Leinster House, which was first built in 1745–48 by James FitzGerald, 1st Duke of Leinster as the ducal palace for the Dukes of Leinster. The White House in the United States, seat of the U.S. President, was based on Leinster House, and was designed by Irish architect James Hoban for George Washington, who also supervised the U.S. Capitol's construction for Thomas Jefferson. The Dukes were related to the Royal houses of Bourbon, Medici, and Habsburg, among others, as the first Duke married the great-granddaughter of King Charles II of the Royal House of Stuart. Charles's mother, Queen Henrietta Maria de Bourbon, was the aunt of Louis XIV of Versailles, while his grandmother and great-grandmother were the Queens Marie de' Medici and Joanna of Habsburg. The current Duke is Maurice FitzGerald, 9th Duke of Leinster, who is also the 9th Marquess of Kildare, 28th Earl of Kildare, 9th Earl of Offaly, 9th Viscount Leinster of Taplow, 14th Baron Offaly, 6th Baron Kildare.

== Cambro-Norman origins ==
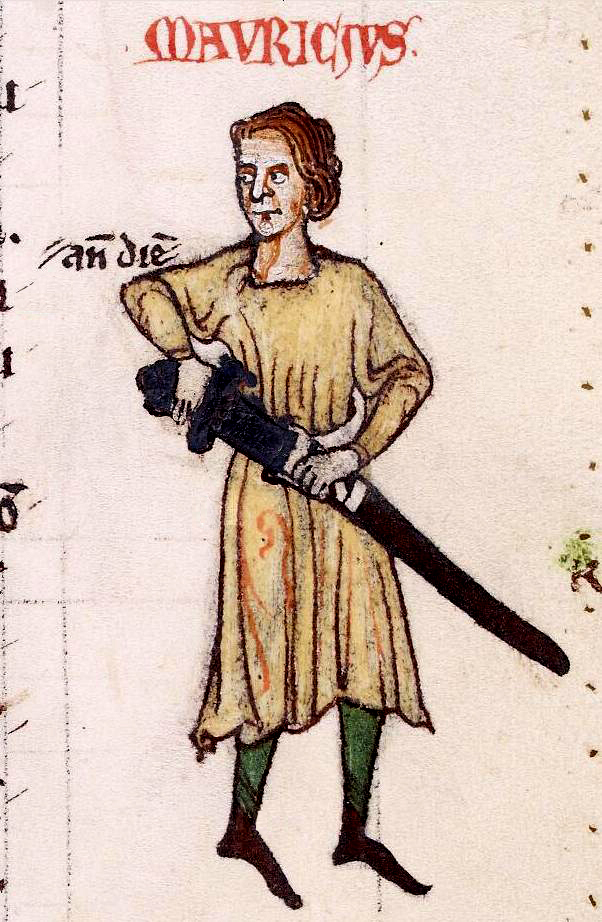
Maurice FitzGerald, Lord of Lanstephan, progenitor of the Irish Geraldines, from a manuscript of the Expugnatio Hibernica, an account of the 1169 invasion of Ireland written by Maurice's nephew, Gerald of Wales, in 1189.

The surname FitzGerald is a patronymic of the Norman form, fitz meaning "son". "Fitz Gerald" thus means in Old Norman and in Old French "son of Gerald". Gerald itself is a Germanic compound of ger, "spear", and waltan, "rule". Variant spellings include Fitz-Gerald and the modern Fitzgerald. The name can also appear as two separate words Fitz Gerald.

The earliest recorded use of the patronymic FitzGerald is that of Raoul fitz Gerald le Chambellan, member of the Tancarville family. Raoul was a Norman baron, Chamberlain of Normandy, educator of the young William, future Conqueror of England, and father of William de Tancarville, Earl of Tankerville and chief chamberlain of Normandy and England after the Norman conquest. The eponymous ancestor of the various FitzGerald branches, as well as of the de Barry and FitzMaurice families, was Gerald FitzWalter of Windsor. Gerald was a Norman adventurer who took part in the 1093 invasion of South Wales upon the death in battle of Rhys ap Tewdwr, last king of South Wales.

Gerald was the youngest son of another Norman adventurer, Walter fitz Otho, William the Conqueror's Constable for the strategic military fortress of Windsor Castle, as well as the King's Keeper of the Forests of Berkshire. Domesday Book records Walter fitz Otho as tenant-in-chief of lands formerly held by conquered Englishmen in Berkshire, Buckinghamshire, Hampshire, and Middlesex. Walter's positions and most of his lands were inherited by Gerald's older brothers, Robert, Maurice, and William, the oldest, ancestor of the earls of Plymouth, while Gerald inherited the estate of Moulsford, now in Oxfordshire, near to Wallingford, where his father owned a fortified house adjacent to those of other powerful Norman authorities.

Nest ferch Rhys ap Tewdwr was the daughter of the last king of South Wales by his wife, Gwladys ferch Rhiwallon ap Cynfyn of Powys. Their grandchildren, Maurice FitzGerald, Lord of Lanstephan, Raymond le Gros and Philip de Barry were leaders in the Norman invasion of Ireland. Nest's son by her second marriage, Robert FitzStephen, was another participant, as was William de Hay, husband of one of Gerald's and Nest's granddaughters. Nest's grandson (through her son by Henry I of England, son of William the Conqueror), named Meiler FitzHenry, was appointed Lord Justice of Ireland for his cousin, King Henry II of England, member of the House of Plantagenet.

The most renowned of Gerald's and Nest's grandchildren, Gerald of Wales, gave an account of the Norman invasion, as well as lively and invaluable descriptions of Ireland and Wales in the late 12th century. He became Archdeacon of Brecon, serving Archbishop Baldwin of Forde, a past tutor of Pope Eugene III's nephew, and worked with him at recruiting members for the Third Crusade of Richard the Lionheart against Saladin. On many attempts Gerald tried to become the Bishop of St. Davids but failed, despite having met in Rome Pope Innocent III, who would later experience the Sack of Constantinople. More than twenty works has been produced by Gerald of Wales, and his statue can be seen today in City Hall, Cardiff, in Wales.

== Gherardini of Ireland ==
The earliest record of the House of Gherardini of Ireland, represented by the FitzGeralds, can be traced back in the year 1413 to the accounts of Lord Antonio d'Ottaviano di Rossellino Gherardini. A priest named Maurice Fitzgerald was of passage in Florence at that time, with a Bishop of the Order of Saint Augustine, and has been able to enter in contact with one of his fellow kinsman, who then introduced him to other members of the Gherardinis. As being part of the Gherardini family that dwelt in the island of Ireland, further exchanges were eventually done by the family to meet again. A letter written in 1440 by the Chancellor of Florence, Leonardo Bruni, one of the associates of Cosimo de' Medici, stipulated that Giovanni Betti di Gherardini, a representative of the family, was sent to Ireland to become acquainted with his other kinsmen from the Geraldines of Ireland, the Earls of Kildare.

Confirmed as well in 1507 by the Viceroy of Ireland, Gerald Fitzgerald, to Giovanni Manni, a Florentine merchant in passage to Ireland. Gerald Fitzgerald's letters were signed as "Gerald, Chief in Ireland of the family of the Gherardini". His son, the 9th Earl of Kildare, was also known as Lord Garrett, which translates as Signore Gherardini in Italian, and was married to Elizabeth Grey of the Royal House of Grey, a granddaughter of Queen Elizabeth Woodville. A letter written in 1566 by Girolamo Fortini, who was married to a daughter of Antonio Gherardini from Florence, to his brother in London, also stated that the Earl of Kildare was of the same family.

Cristoforo Landino, tutor of Lorenzo de' Medici, stated in his preface of the Divine Comedy (Comedia) of the famous poet Dante Alighieri, that the descendants of Tommaso, Gherardo, and Maurizio Gherardini were the ancestors of the Earls of Kildare and Earls of Desmonds, and went on to Conquer Ireland with the King of England. The Divine Comedy was first launch at the Palazzo Vecchio in Florence. The English poet Henry Howard, Earl of Surrey, user of the sonnet form that would later be used by William Shakespeare, also referred to the ancestral seat of the Geraldines in Florence in his poem Description and praise of his love.

Since the 15th century, the FitzGeralds and the Gherardinis are known to be in touch and to acknowledge their kinship. A 2014 cover story published by "Sette", the Italian weekly magazine of Corriere della Sera, was an article dedicated to the Gherardini family of Montagliari and their relationship with the FitzGerald Family as well as with the Kennedy family. According to the magazine, the three families have maintained relationship among them even in recent times or in the past (for example with American President John Fitzgerald Kennedy). The link with the Kennedy family came from the Earl of Desmond branch, and can be seen on the coat of arms granted to John FitzGerald Kennedy by the Chief Herald of Ireland.

== Major houses ==
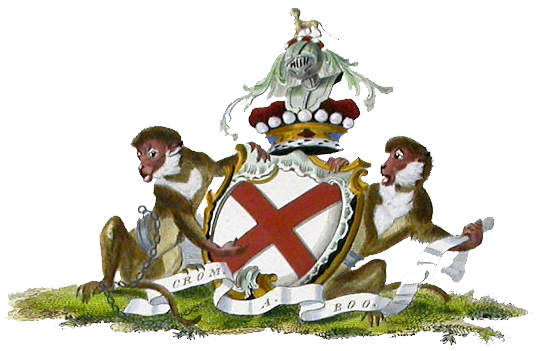
Arms of the Fitzgeralds of Kildare, Viscounts of Leinster, by Charles Catton (1790)

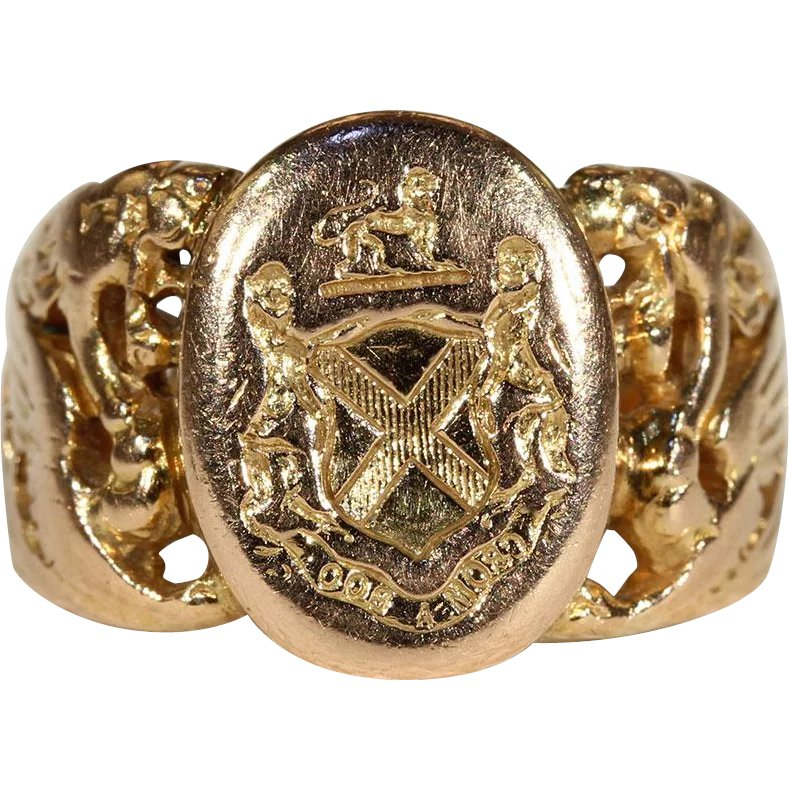
Fitzgerald family seal engraved on a signet ring from 1616

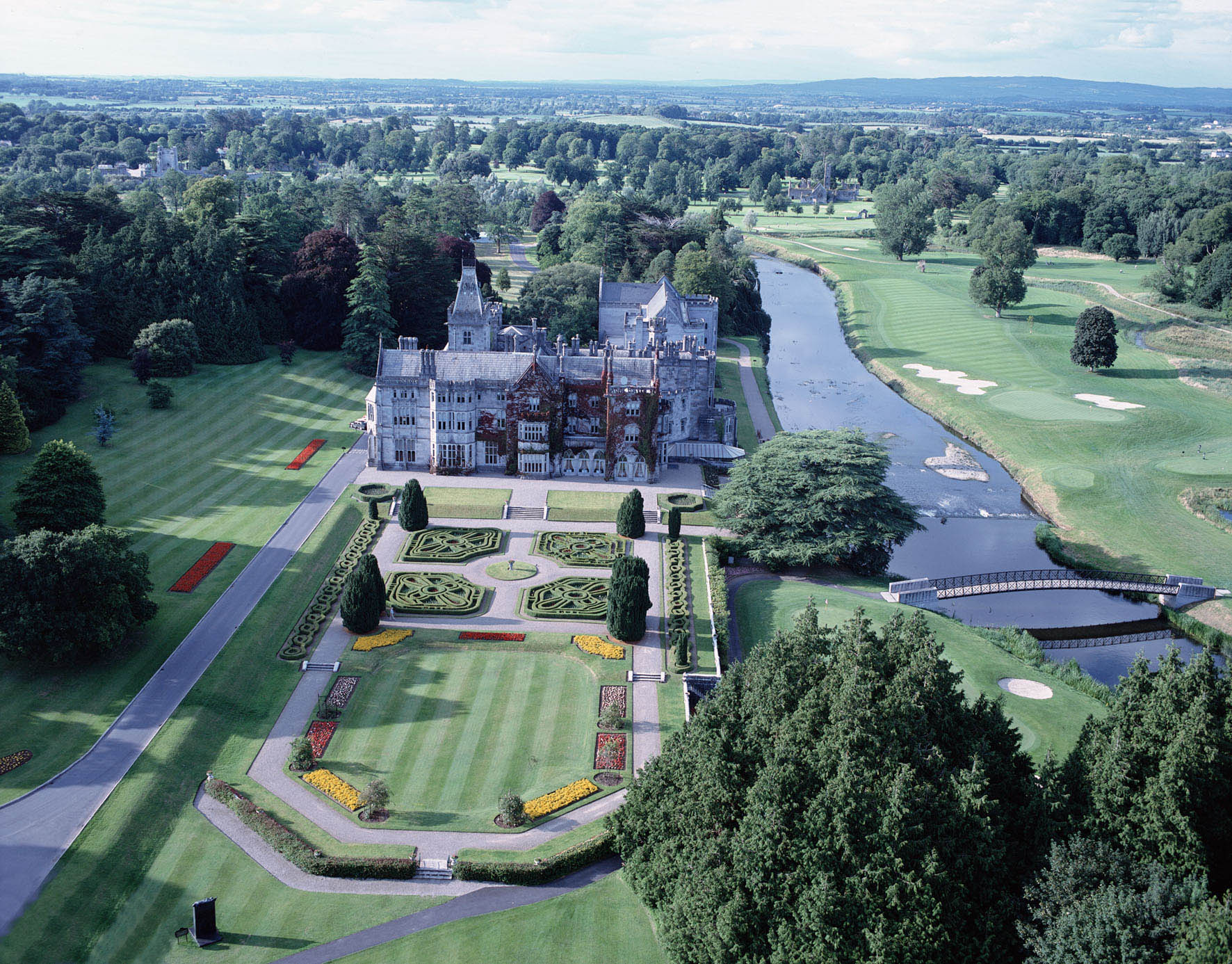
Adare Manor, granted during the 13th century to the Earls of Kildare, was lost by Thomas FitzGerald, 10th Earl of Kildare

=== House of Kildare ===
==== Lords of Offaly ====
- Gerald FitzMaurice, 1st Lord of Offaly (c. 1150–1204), was granted estates in Ireland, confirmed by Prince John Plantagenet
- Maurice FitzMaurice FitzGerald, 2nd Lord of Offaly (1194–1257), Justiciar of Ireland, accompanied King Henry of Winchester to Poitou and Gascony in France
- Maurice FitzGerald, 3rd Lord of Offaly (1238–1286), Justiciar of Ireland, chief magnate summoned by Prince Edward Longshanks about the wars in Ireland with Walter de Burgh, 1st Earl of Ulster

==== Earls of Kildare ====
- John FitzGerald, 1st Earl of Kildare (1250–1316), already 4th Lord of Offaly, was rewarded for serving Edward I of England in Scotland
- Thomas FitzGerald, 2nd Earl of Kildare (died 1328), younger (only surviving) son of the 1st Earl, in charge of 30,000 men against Earl Edward Bruce, brother of King Robert the Bruce
  - John FitzGerald (1314–1323), eldest son of the 2nd Earl, died in childhood
- Richard FitzGerald, 3rd Earl of Kildare (1317–1329), second son of the 2nd Earl, died unmarried
- Maurice FitzGerald, 4th Earl of Kildare (1318–1390), third and youngest son of the 2nd Earl, leader of the army, serving King Edward of Windsor at the siege of Calais
- Gerald FitzGerald, 5th Earl of Kildare (died 1410), a son of the 4th Earl, leading opponent of the Lord Lieutenant of Ireland, John Talbot, 1st Earl of Shrewsbury
  - The 5th Earl had sons, but they presumably predeceased him
- John FitzGerald, 6th Earl of Kildare (de jure; d. 1427), a younger son of the 4th Earl
- Thomas FitzGerald, 7th Earl of Kildare (died 1478), son of the 6th Earl, was appointed Lord Deputy of Ireland by Richard Plantagenet, 3rd Duke of York
- Gerald FitzGerald, 8th Earl of Kildare (c. 1456–1513), "The Great Earl", eldest son of the 7th earl, was "the uncrowned King of Ireland", he married a cousin of the Tudor King Henry VII
- Gerald FitzGerald, 9th Earl of Kildare (1487–1534), "Young Gerald", eldest son of the 8th earl, married the great-granddaughter of Elizabeth Woodville, Queen consort of King Edward IV

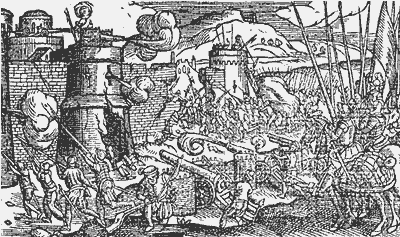
16th-century woodcut of an attack on Dublin Castle by "Silken Thomas", 10th Earl of Kildare

- Thomas FitzGerald, 10th Earl of Kildare (died 1537), "Silken Thomas", eldest son of the 9th earl, led an insurrection in Ireland and his honours were forfeit, and he died unmarried
- Gerald FitzGerald, 11th Earl of Kildare (1525–1585), the "Wizard Earl", second son of the 9th earl, was given a new creation in 1554, then restored to his brother's honours in 1569
- Henry FitzGerald, 12th Earl of Kildare (1562–1597), second son of the 11th earl, died without male issue, married a daughter of Charles Howard, the Lord High Admiral who won the Spanish Armada
- William FitzGerald, 13th Earl of Kildare (died 1599), third and youngest son of the 11th earl, died unmarried
- Gerald FitzGerald, 14th Earl of Kildare (died 1612), elder son of Edward, himself third and youngest son of the 9th earl, his mother was Countess Elizabeth Grey, a cousin of Henry VIII
- Gerald FitzGerald, 15th Earl of Kildare (1611–1620), only son of the 14th earl, died in childhood
- George FitzGerald, 16th Earl of Kildare (1612–1660), a son of Thomas, himself younger brother of the 14th earl, his grandfather Thomas Randolph negotiated the marriage of Mary, Queen of Scots
- Wentworth FitzGerald, 17th Earl of Kildare (1634–1664), elder son of the 16th earl, married Elizabeth Vere, a granddaughter of Horace Vere, 1st Baron Vere of Tilbury of the House of De Vere
- John FitzGerald, 18th Earl of Kildare (1661–1707), only son of the 17th earl, died without surviving issue, married a granddaughter of George Stewart, 9th Seigneur d'Aubigny of the House of Stuart
  - Henry FitzGerald, Lord Offaly (1683–1684), only son of the 18th earl, died in infancy
- Robert FitzGerald, 19th Earl of Kildare (1675–1744), only son of Robert, himself younger son of the 16th earl, married a granddaughter of Sir Edward Villiers, member of the powerful House of Villiers
- James FitzGerald, 20th Earl of Kildare (1722–1773) was created Marquess of Kildare in 1761, married to a daughter of Duke Charles Lennox, the great-grandson of Queen Henrietta Maria de Bourbon
- Lettice FitzGerald, 1st Baroness Offaly, suo jure Baroness Offaly (1580–1658), her maternal great-grandmother was Mary Boleyn, elder sister of Queen Anne Boleyn
- Lord Edward FitzGerald (1763–1798), Irish aristocrat and revolutionary, was a cousin of Charles James Fox, fought on the British side during the American War of Independence
- Lady Edward FitzGerald, known as "Pamela" (c. 1773–1831), wife of Lord Edward FitzGerald, adopted daughter of comtesse Stéphanie Félicité, family fled France during the French Revolution

==== Marquesses of Kildare (1761) ====
- James FitzGerald, 1st Marquess of Kildare (1722–1773) was created Duke of Leinster in 1766

==== Dukes of Leinster, second Creation (1766) ====
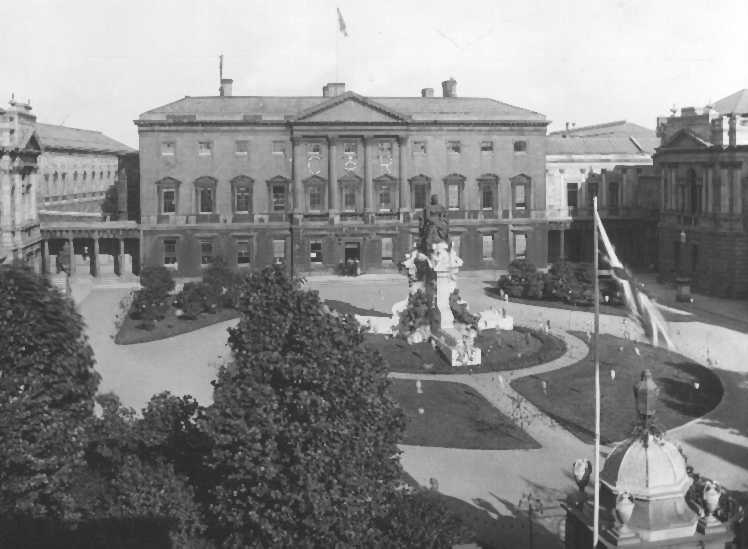
Leinster House, former ducal residence in Dublin of the Duke of Leinster

Other titles: Marquesse of Kildare (1761), Earl of Kildare (1316), Earl of Offaly (1761), Viscount Leinster, of Taplow in the County of Buckingham (GB 1747) and Lord of Offaly (c. 1193–?)

- James FitzGerald, 1st Duke of Leinster (1722–1773), elder son of the 19th earl, his wife, Lady Emily Lennox, was a cousin of King George III, and a granddaughter of Charles Lennox, 1st Duke of Richmond
- William FitzGerald, 2nd Duke of Leinster (1749–1804), second son of the 1st duke, his grandson Philippe de Rohan-Chabot, Comte de Jarnac, was a member of the French House of Rohan
  - George FitzGerald, Marquess of Kildare (1783–1784), eldest son of the 2nd duke, died in infancy
- Augustus FitzGerald, 3rd Duke of Leinster (1791–1874), second son of the 2nd duke, member of the Privy Council and was Lord High Constable of Ireland for William IV and Queen Victoria

Other titles (4th Duke onwards): Baron Kildare (UK 1870)

- Charles FitzGerald, 4th Duke of Leinster (1819–1887), eldest son of the 3rd duke, married a daughter of Duke George Sutherland-Leveson-Gower, her grandfather the 1st Duke was the wealthiest man in Britain
- Gerald FitzGerald, 5th Duke of Leinster (1851–1893), eldest son of the 4th duke, was a nephew of George Douglas Campbell, 8th Duke of Argyll, and Hugh Grosvenor, 1st Duke of Westminster
- Maurice FitzGerald, 6th Duke of Leinster (1887–1922), eldest son of the 5th duke, died unmarried, grandson of William Duncombe, 1st Earl of Feversham
- Edward FitzGerald, 7th Duke of Leinster (1892–1976), third and youngest son of the 5th duke, married actress Denise Orme, grandmother of Prince Aga Khan IV, was stepfather of Princess Taj-ud-dawlah
- Gerald FitzGerald, 8th Duke of Leinster (1914–2004), only legitimate son of the 7th duke, his step-sister married Prince Aly Khan, son of Sultan Aga Khan III, President of the League of Nations
- Maurice FitzGerald, 9th Duke of Leinster (born 1948), elder son of the 8th duke, landscape designer, brother of Lord John FitzGerald, horseracing administrator of the Sheikh of Dubai, Mohammed Bin Rashid
  - Thomas FitzGerald, Earl of Offaly (1974–1997), only son of the 9th duke, died unmarried in a road traffic collision
  - The heir presumptive is the 9th Duke's nephew Edward FitzGerald (born 1988), being the son of the present Duke's deceased younger brother Lord John FitzGerald (1952–2015)

=== House of Desmond ===
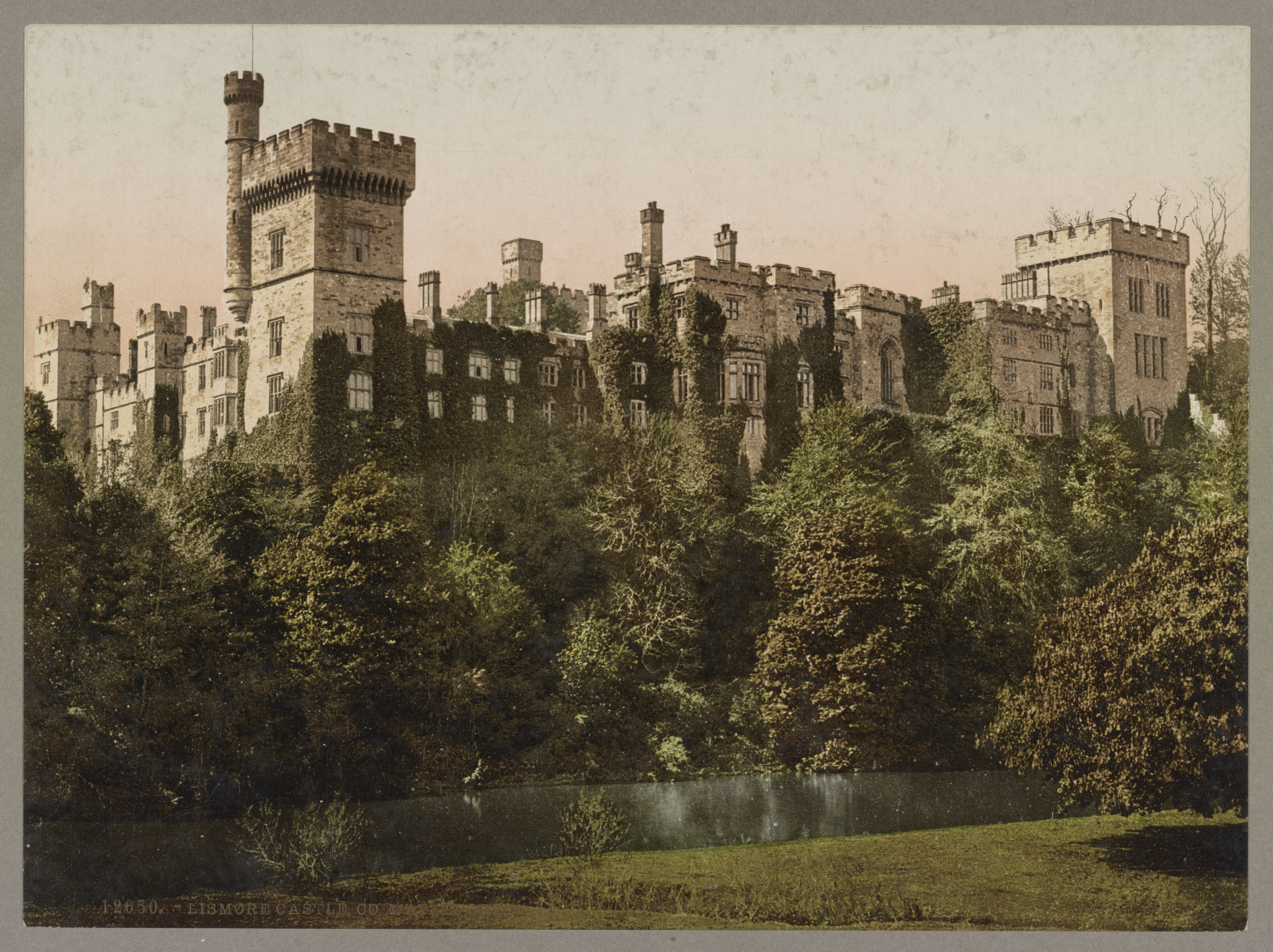
Lismore Castle, in the possession of the Earls of Desmond until the downfall of Gerald FitzGerald, 14th Earl of Desmond

The line of the Earls of Desmond has been extinct since the 17th century. Their branch of the dynasty continues only in their distant collateral kinsmen, Ireland's hereditary knights (for whom see section below).

==== Barons Desmond (1259) ====
- John FitzThomas, 1st Baron Desmond (died 1261) son of Thomas FitzMaurice, Lord OConnello, fought the King of Desmond Finghin Mac Cárthaigh and the O'Sullivans
- Thomas FitzMaurice FitzGerald, 2nd Baron Desmond (died 1298) (grandson of preceding), was deputy justiciar and acted as Lord Chief Justice of Ireland
- Thomas FitzThomas FitzGerald, 3rd Baron Desmond (1290–1307) (son of preceding), died young with great wealth and large estates
- Maurice FitzThomas FitzGerald, 4th Baron Desmond (died 1356) (brother of preceding; created earl of Desmond in 1329), married a daughter of the Prince of Thomond

==== Earls of Desmond, First creation (1329) ====
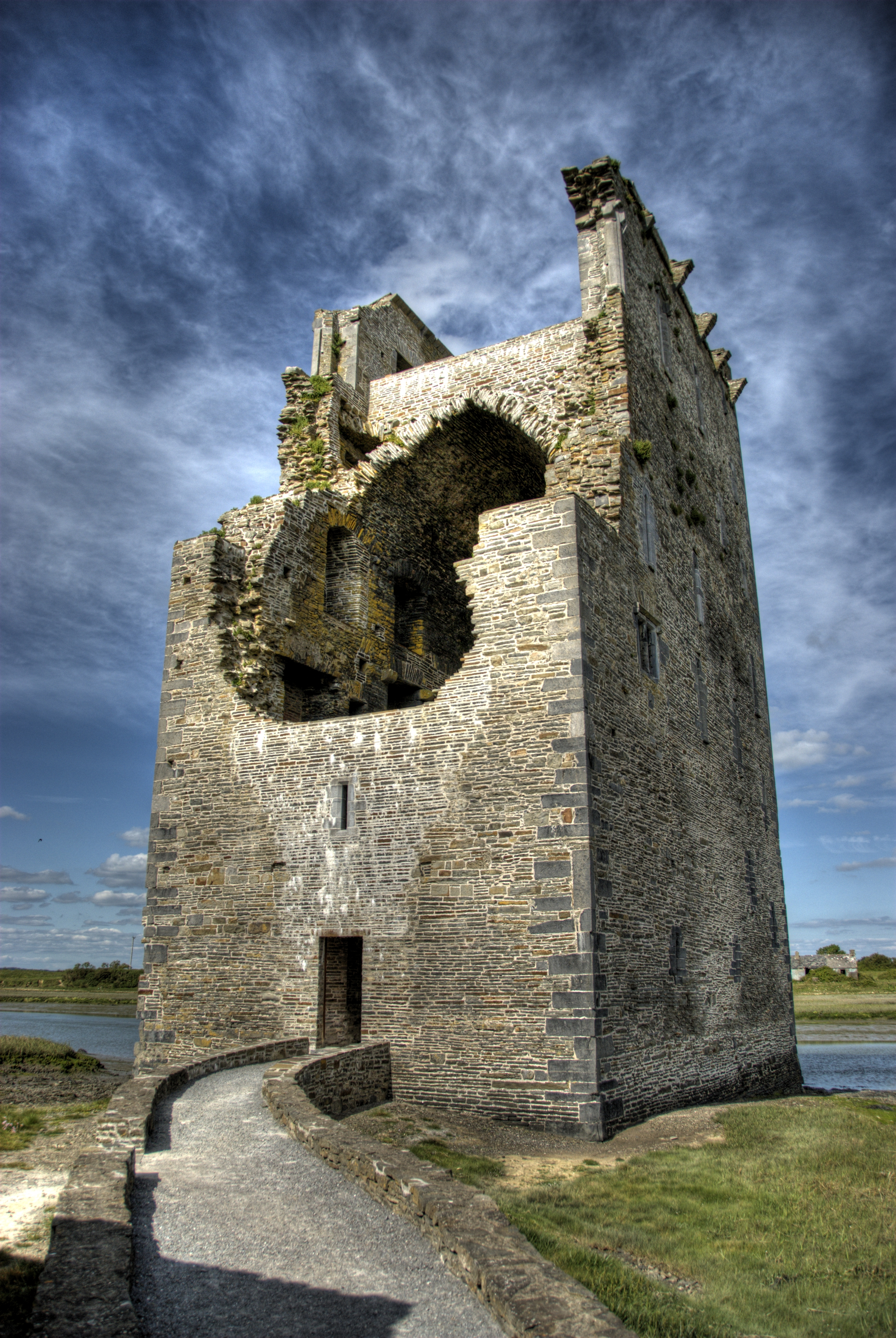
Carrigafoyle Castle, a Desmond Geraldine stronghold during the Second Desmond Rebellion, captured by the English in 1580

- Maurice FitzGerald, 1st Earl of Desmond (died 1356) (new creation), assisted in the war against King Philip VI of France of the House of Valois
- Maurice FitzGerald, 2nd Earl of Desmond (1336–1358) (son of preceding), married the daughter of Ralph Stafford, 1st Earl of Stafford,
- Gerald FitzGerald, 3rd Earl of Desmond (died 1398) (half-brother of preceding), in-law of Henry of Grosmont, Duke of Lancaster, of the House of Plantagenet
- John FitzGerald, 4th Earl of Desmond (died 1399) (son of preceding), grandson of James Butler, 2nd Earl of Ormond, and descendant of Edward Longshanks
- Thomas FitzGerald, 5th Earl of Desmond (c. 1386–1420) (son of preceding), withdrew to France and died at Rouen, buried in Paris with two Kings in attendance
- James FitzGerald, 6th Earl of Desmond (died 1463) (the "Usurper," paternal uncle of preceding), godfather to George Plantagenet, 1st Duke of Clarence
- Thomas FitzGerald, 7th Earl of Desmond (died 1468) (son of preceding), Lord Deputy of Ireland under the Duke of Clarence, brother of King Edward IV of the House of York
- James FitzGerald, 8th Earl of Desmond (1459–1487) (son of preceding), married to a daughter of Thady O'Brien, Prince of Thomond, received gifts from King Richard III
- Maurice FitzGerald, 9th Earl of Desmond (died 1520) (brother of preceding), supported Perkin Warbeck, pretender to the English throne, in the Siege of Waterford
- James FitzGerald, 10th Earl of Desmond (died 1529) (son of preceding), fought in the War of the League of Cognac for Charles V, Holy Roman Emperor of the House of Habsburg
- Thomas FitzGerald, 11th Earl of Desmond (1454–1534) (paternal uncle of preceding), signed the Treaty of Dingle with Don Gonzalez Fernandez, Ambassador of Emperor Charles V
- John FitzGerald, de facto 12th Earl of Desmond (died 1536) (brother of preceding, paternal granduncle of James FitzGerald, de jure 12th Earl of Desmond)
- James FitzGerald, de jure 12th Earl of Desmond (died 1540) (grandson of Thomas FitzGerald, 11th Earl of Desmond, grandnephew of John FitzGerald, de facto 12th Earl of Desmond)
- James FitzGerald, 13th Earl of Desmond (died 1558) (son of John FitzGerald, de facto 12th Earl of Desmond), appointed Lord Treasurer of Ireland by King Edward Tudor
- Gerald FitzGerald, 14th Earl of Desmond (c. 1533–1583) (son of preceding; forfeit 1582), fought in the Battle of Affane and led the Second Desmond Rebellion

==== 16th Earl of Desmond, appointed by Hugh O'Neill (1598–1601) ====
- James FitzThomas FitzGerald the Sugán Earl, died in Tower of London c.1607, was chased by George Carew, 1st Earl of Totnes

==== Earls of Desmond, Second creation (1600) ====
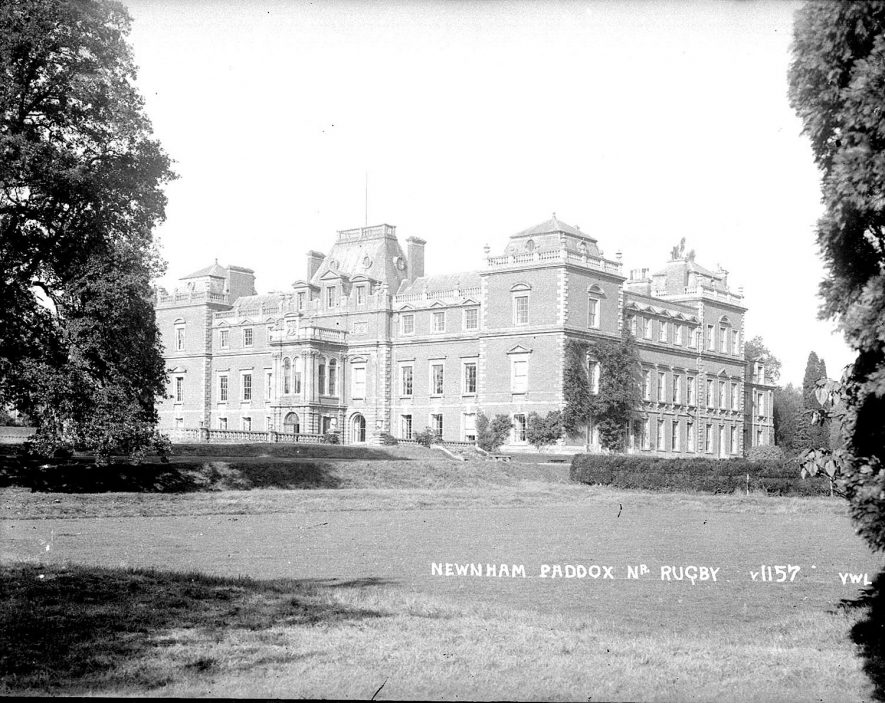
Newnham Paddox House, seat of the Earls of Desmond and Earls of Denbigh since 1433, title inherited in the female line, granted to Richard Preston, 1st Earl of Desmond

- James FitzGerald, 1st Earl of Desmond (1571–1601) (known as the "Tower Earl of Desmond"), son of Eleanor Butler, Countess of Desmond

==== Lords of Decies ====
- Gerald Fitzgerald, 3rd Lord Decies, married to a daughter of Piers Butler, 8th Earl of Ormond, member of the House of Butler

==== FitzMaurice of Kerry ====
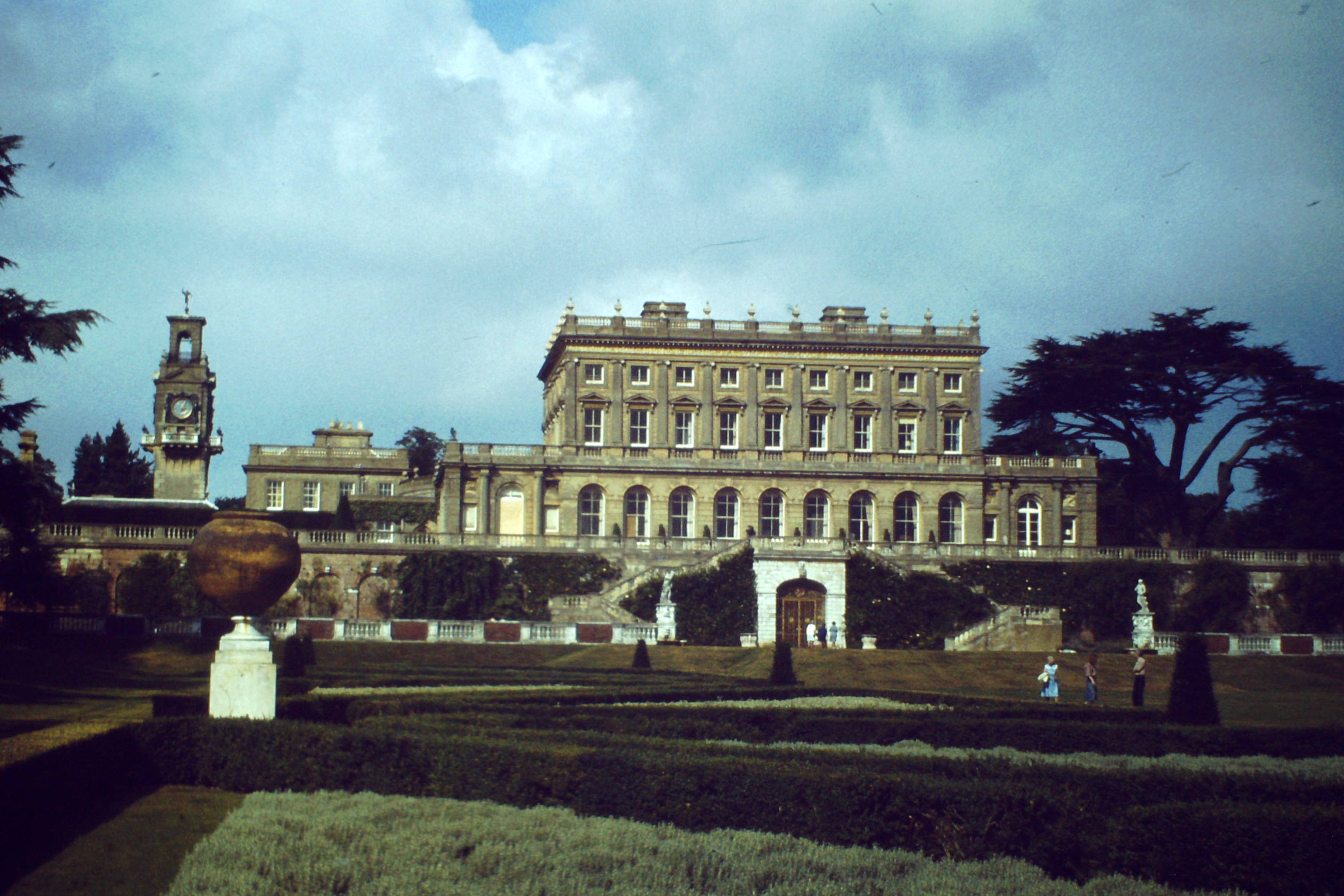
Cliveden House, estate of Countess FitzMaurice, sister-in-law of Prime Minister Lord Shelburne, Marquess of Lansdowne

The closely related FitzMaurice Barons and later Earls of Kerry continue in the male line with the current Petty-FitzMaurice Marquesses of Lansdowne, but they descend from John FitzGerald, 1st Baron Desmond's nephew, Thomas FitzMaurice, 1st Baron of Kerry, son of his brother Maurice FitzThomas. Thus in fact they represent a "sister" branch to the FitzGeralds of Desmond. However this technically makes them slightly closer to the FitzGeralds of Desmond than either are to the Offaly-Kildare-Leinster Geraldines, represented by the modern Dukes of Leinster, who descend from Gerald FitzMaurice, 1st Lord of Offaly, uncle of the 1st Baron Desmond.

==== House of Corsygedol ====
The House of Corsygedol (Vaughans) is a branch of the Lords of Desmond, now Earls of Desmond, and was founded by Osborn Wyddel (Fitzgerald-Osbourne), a descendant of Gerald de Windsor. Wyddel, c. 13th century arrived in Wales (Kingdom of Gwynedd) from Ireland with Prince Llywelyn the Great and was granted estates and arms, he married a ward of Llywelyn, who was also an heiress of the Corsygedol and Plas Hen estates in Gwynedd. They flourished in North Wales for centuries, by the 18th century, their Corsygedol estates were inherited by the Mostyn baronets family through marriage.

Its cadet branches are the House of Yale (Yale family) of Plas-yn-Yale, and the Hughes of Gwerclas of Gwerclas, native royal families of the Mathrafal dynasty. Their coat of arms are those of Osborn Fitzgerald; viz. erm. on saltire gu. a crescent or. Crest is a wild boar in a toil.

==== Hereditary knights ====
These three hereditary knighthoods were created for their kinsmen by the Earls of Desmond, acting as Earls Palatine.

- Knight of Kerry (Green Knight) – the holder is Sir Adrian FitzGerald, 6th Baronet of Valencia, 24th Knight of Kerry. He is also a Knight of Malta, and President of the Irish Association of the Sovereign Military Order of Malta.
- Knight of Glin (Black Knight) – dormant (from 2011), after the death of Desmond FitzGerald, 29th Knight of Glin, the ancestral seat for over 700 years is Glin Castle.
- White Knight (Fitzgibbon family) – dormant (from 1611), after the death of Maurice Oge Fitzgibbon, 12th White Knight.

== Legacy ==
Saint Patrick's Saltire

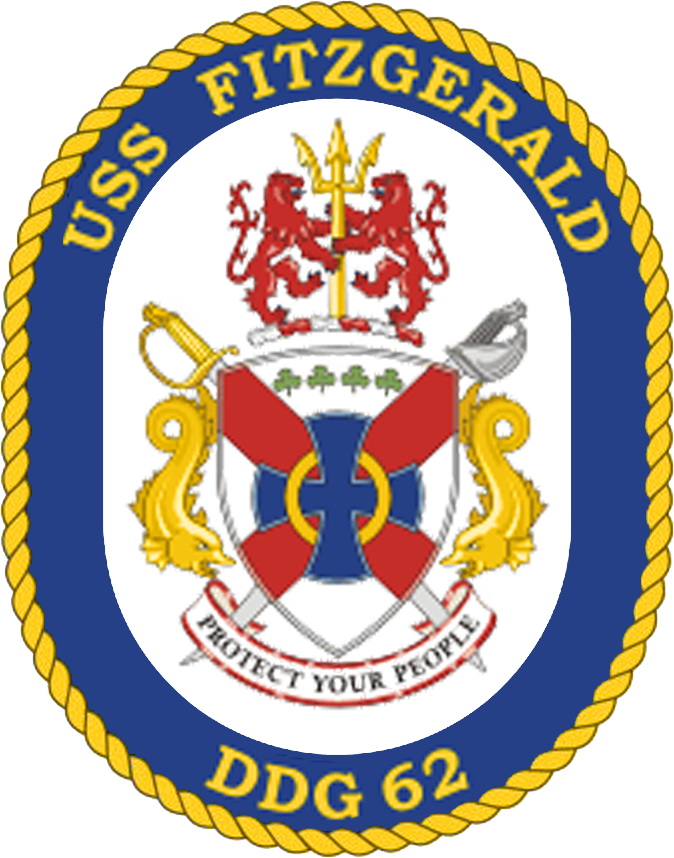
Badge of USS Fitzgerald

The Flag of the United Kingdom, incorporating St. Patrick's Saltire

According to the 1890 Matheson report, Fitzgerald/FitzGerald was the 36th most common surname in Ireland.

Fitzgerald/FitzGerald is the 692nd most frequent surname in the United Kingdom. The surname occurs most frequently in the following ten counties, in descending order, with the number of occurrences in parentheses: "1. Greater London, (500), Greater Manchester (191), West Midlands (176), Lancashire (130), Kent (118), Essex (117), West Yorkshire (113), Merseyside (108), Hampshire (84), and Surrey (76)."

"Fitzgerald" (including "FitzGerald," as the survey was not case-sensitive), was the 390th most common surname in the 2000 United States census. 73,522 Fitzgeralds were counted, with 27.25 Fitzgeralds per 100,000 members of the population. Respondents surnamed Fitzgerald had self-reported ethnicities of 88.03% non-Hispanic white only, 8.44% non-Hispanic black only, 0.32% non-Hispanic Asian or Pacific Islander only, 1.28% non-Hispanic Asian only, 1.43% of two or more non-Hispanic races, and 1.43% Hispanic.

The FitzGerald dynasty was the subject of a poem called "The Geraldines" by Thomas Osborne Davis, the chief organizer and poet of the nationalist Young Ireland movement. The ill-fated romance of Thomas FitzGerald, 5th Earl of Desmond with Catherine MacCormac was the subject of the air "Desmond's Song" by the Irish poet Thomas Moore.

Saint Patrick's Saltire, sometimes used to represent Ireland in modern flags, may have derived from the arms of the Geraldines.

The Arleigh Burke-class destroyer USS Fitzgerald in the United States Navy is named for Lieutenant William Charles Fitzgerald, USN. The Fitzgerald family coat of arms (a white shield with a red saltire) provides the foundation for the coat of arms for USS Fitzgerald.

A variety of people, places, and businesses bear the name FitzGerald or Fitzgerald, including the FitzGerald crater on the far side of the Moon, named for physicist George FitzGerald.

Ancestors of FitzGerald dynasty

Otho
Walter FitzOtho
Gerald de Windsor, Constable of Pembroke Castle
Beatrice
Maurice FitzGerald, Lord of Lanstephan
Tewdwr ap Cadell
Rhys ap Tewdwr of the House of Dinefwr, King of Deheubarth
Nest ferch Rhys of Deheubarth
Rhiwallon ap Cynfyn of Powys
Gwladys ferch Rhiwallon of Powys

== See also ==
- Irish nobility
- Hiberno-Norman
- FitzGerald baronets
- Butler–FitzGerald dispute
