= Gwerclas =

Site in Denbighshire, Wales

Coordinates: 52.9682°N 3.4118°W

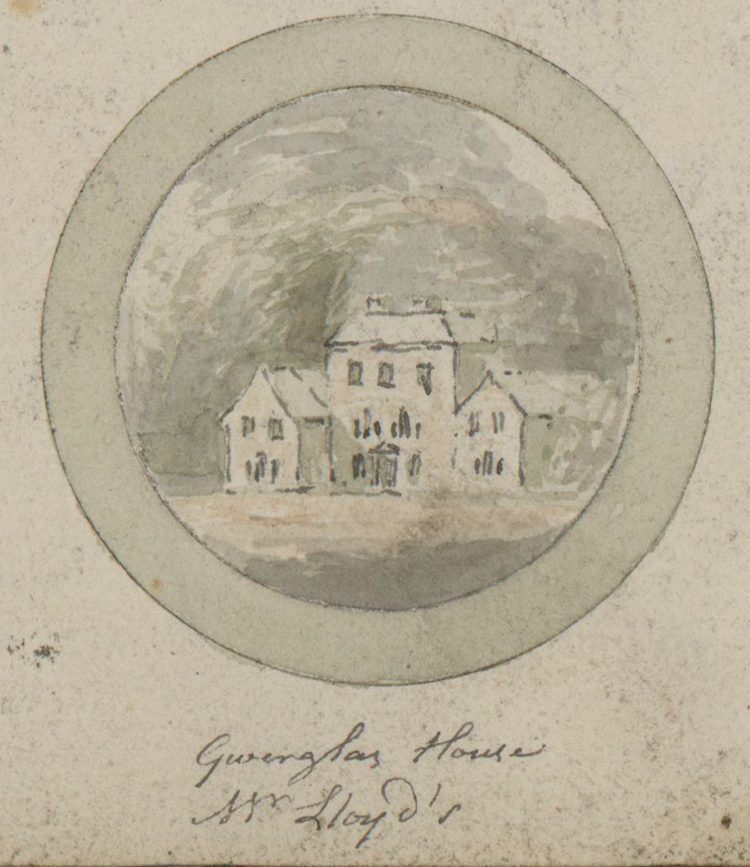
Gwerclas

Gwerclas usually refers to a former castle and farmstead close to Cymmer in the parish of Llangar in the ancient cantref of Edeyrnion, Wales. It is now just an uninhabited upland area. The modest castle found at the site during the early Middle Ages is now completely ruinous. The ancient Barons of Cymmer yn Edeyrnion (known as the Hughes of Gwerclas) cite this place as their ancestral home. Prior to the resettling of the castle in 1186 by the ancestors of the Hughes family it was the power base of the mysterious Maer Du or "Black Mayors" of Edeyrnion.
