= Cambro-Normans =

Norman settlers in southern Wales and the Welsh Marches

Cambro-Normans (Latin: Cambria; "Wales", Welsh: Normaniaid Cymreig; Norman: Nouormands Galles) were Normans who settled in southern Wales and the Welsh Marches after the Norman invasion of Wales. Cambro-Norman knights were also the leading force in the Cambro-Norman invasion of Ireland, led by Richard de Clare, 2nd Earl of Pembroke in 1170.

== In Wales ==
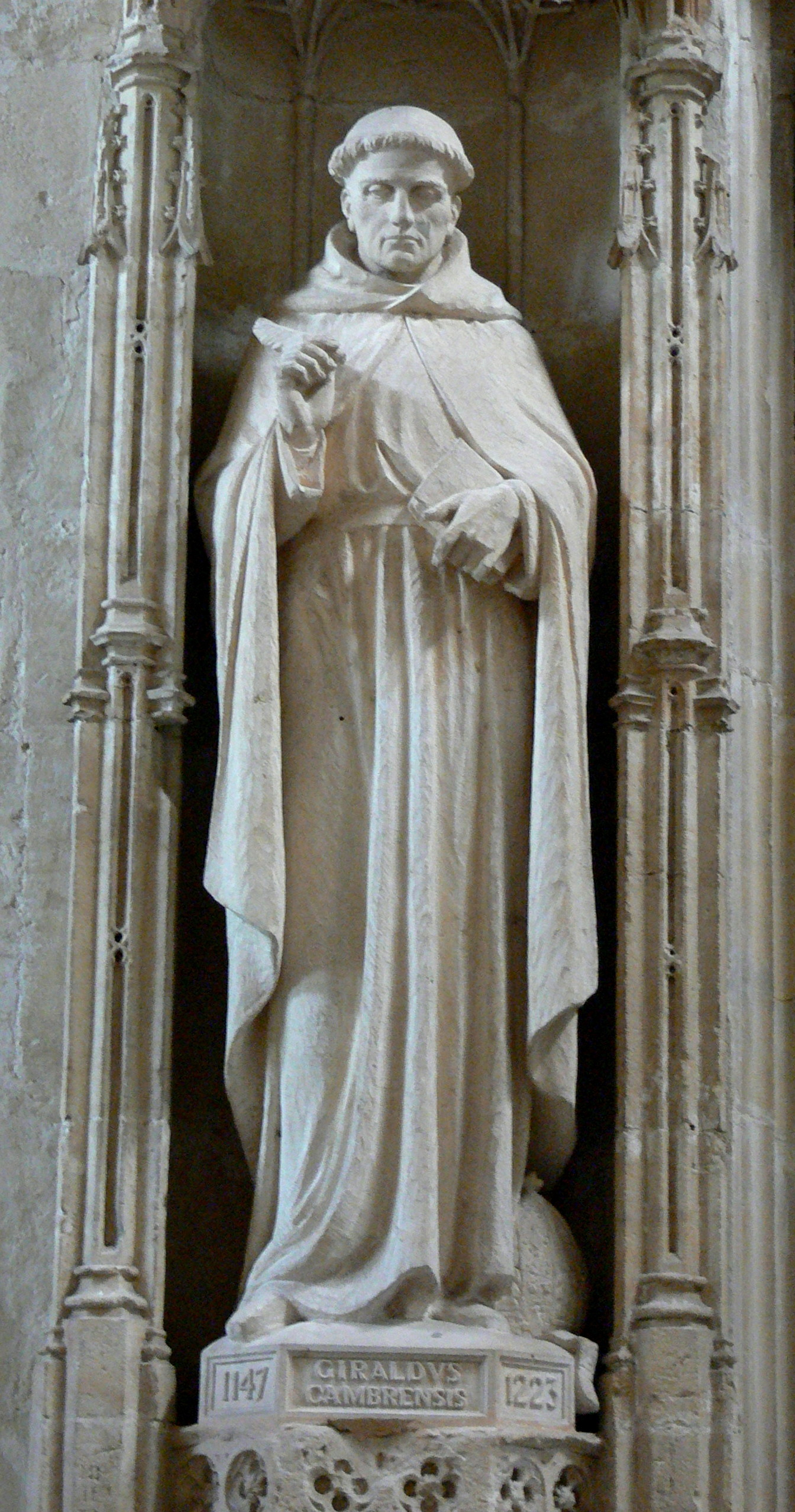
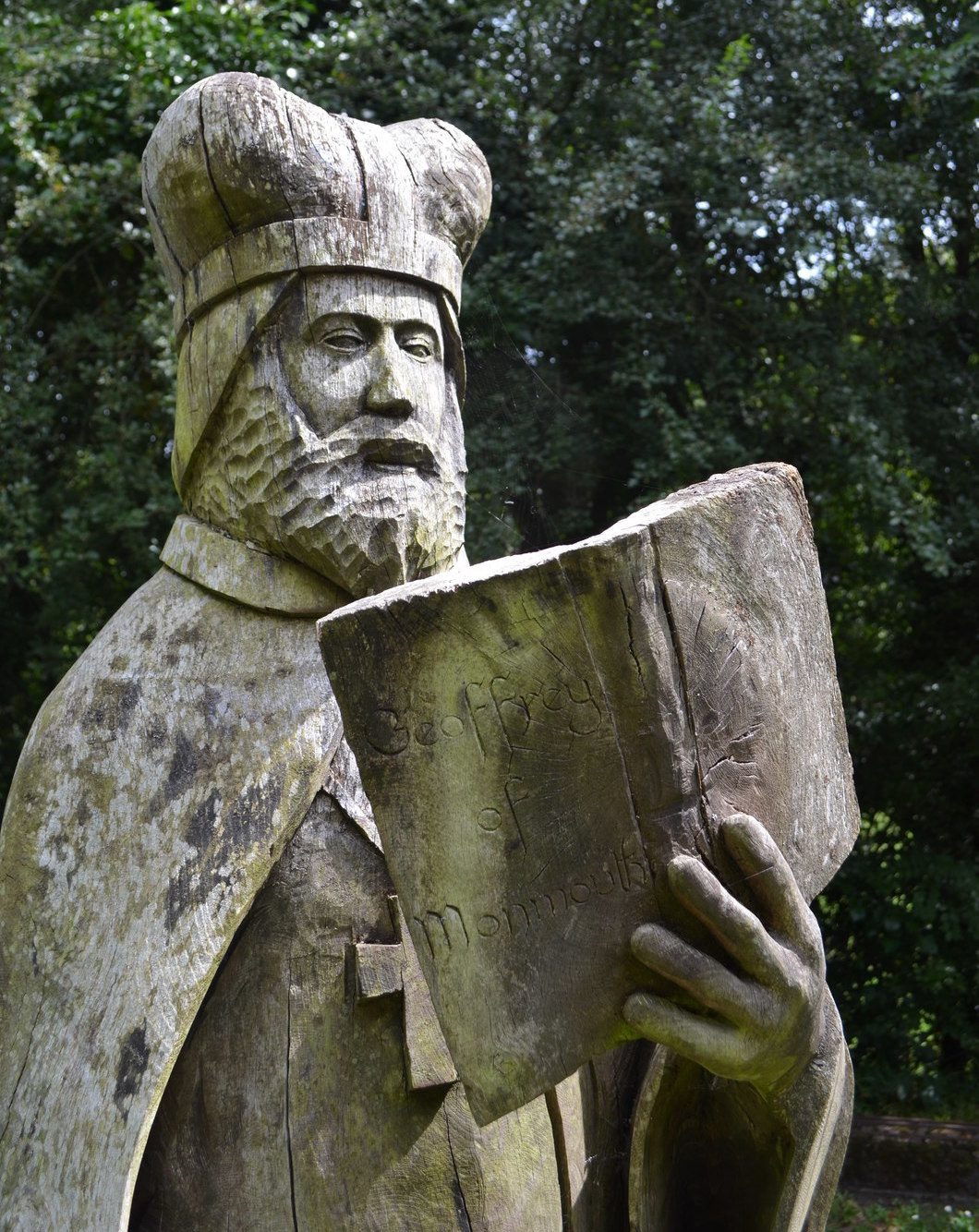
Both Gerald of Wales and Geoffrey of Monmouth are considered prominent Cambro-Normans.

Following the Norman conquest of England, Norman forces would invade South Wales, where William FitzOsbern, 1st Earl of Hereford overran the Kingdom of Gwent and the Earl of Shrewsbury invaded the Kingdom of Deheubarth. Despite a number of Welsh revolts against Norman rule, these areas (along with the Gower), would become the main focus of Norman settlement in Wales.

Although Welsh forces would retake much of the Norman territories following their crushing victory at the Battle of Crug Mawr in 1136, the Norman King of England would control much of the Welsh borders and southern agricultural land by the 12th century. This led to Wales being split in two, with one area becoming the Marcher Lordships and the area under Welsh rule known as "Pura Wallia".

Henry I of England would invite Flemish immigrants into Pembrokeshire, where they established a cloth industry. While the original invaders spoke Norman French, the Cambro-Norman settlements in Wales became English speaking communities.

== In Ireland ==
Some Irish historians prefer to use this term instead of Anglo-Norman because many of the knights who invaded Ireland in 1170, such as the FitzGeralds, originated from and settled in modern-day Wales, following the Norman conquest. South Wales was under Anglo-Norman, Plantagenet control at this point in history and the Cambro-Normans living in south Wales owed their allegiance to Henry II, from Le Mans and not a native Welsh prince, and therefore are often confused with Anglo-Normans due to their allegiance. Contemporary Irish accounts of this period erroneously called the incomers Saxain, which means "Saxon", i.e. "English".

In addition to such Cambro-Norman lords, some of Ireland's most common names, including Walsh and Griffith, came from indigenous Welsh families who came with the Norman invasion. (The surname "Walsh" itself, or in Irish Breathnach, "Briton", means "Welshman", and was applied by the Irish to Welsh who did not have a surname, as well as to particular Cambro-Norman lords.) Other indigenous Welsh surnames, such as Taaffe which came at this time, became very important families within the Pale.

Some well-known Cambro-Norman families include the Butlers, the Joyces and the Barretts.

== See also ==
- Anglo-Norman
- Hiberno-Norman
- Italo-Norman
- Scoto-Norman
