= Lady Joan Fitzgerald =

Irish countess (died 1565)

Joan Fitzgerald
- Countess of Ormond; Countess of Desmond
- Born: c. 1514; Munster, Ireland
- Died: 2 January 1565; Askeaton, County Limerick
- Spouses: 1. James, 9th Earl of Ormond; 2. Francis Bryan; 3. Gerald, 14th Earl of Desmond
- Issue Detail: Thomas, John, Edward, Walter, Edmund, James, Piers
- Father: James, 10th Earl of Desmond
- Mother: Amy O'Brien

Joan Fitzgerald, Countess of Ormond, Countess of Desmond (Irish: Siobhán Nic Gearailt) (died 1565), was an Irish noblewoman and heiress, a member of the Old English FitzGerald family, who were also known as the "Geraldines".

She married three times. Her first husband was James Butler, 9th Earl of Ormond, who had been proposed as a bridegroom for Anne Boleyn in 1522 to settle a dispute over the Ormond title and estates. Her second was Francis Bryan, a courtier and lord justice of Ireland. Her third was Gerald FitzGerald, 14th Earl of Desmond. With her last marriage she brought a period of peace between the FitzGeralds of Desmond and the Butlers, who were hereditary enemies. After her death her widower resumed the old feud by attacking her son Thomas Butler, 10th Earl of Ormond.

During her third marriage she carried on an amicable correspondence with Queen Elizabeth I, who recognised Lady Desmond's skill in diplomacy, and relied upon her to restore and keep the precarious peace in southern Ireland.

Family tree

Joan FitzGerald with two of her three husbands, her parents, and other selected relatives. (Note: This family tree is based on graphic trees of the earls of Desmond and Ormond as well as on written genealogies of these families. Also see the lists of children in the text.)

Thomas; 7th Earl d. 1468 of Drogheda
James; 8th Earl; 1459–1487	Maurice; 9th Earl d. 1520 the Lame	Thomas; 11th Earl; 1454–1534 the Bald	John de facto 12th Earl d. 1536
James; 10th Earl d. 1529	Amy; O'Brien	Maurice fitz Thomas d. 1529 d.v.p.*	James; 13th Earl d. 1558
James; Butler; 9th Earl; 1496–1546	Joan; FitzGerald d. 1565	James; 12th Earl d. 1540; Court Page	Gerald; 14th Earl c. 1533 – 1583; Rebel Earl
Thomas; 10th Earl c. 1531 – 1614; Black Tom	John of Kilcash d. 1570
Walter; 11th Earl; 1559 – 1633 'Beads'

Legend

XXX	Subject of the article	XXX	Earls of Desmond	XXX	Earls of Ormond

*d.v.p. = predeceased his father (decessit vita patris).

== Birth and origins ==
Joan was probably born in 1514 in Munster, Ireland. (Note: She might have been born in 1509, or in 1514. The later date is preferred because it agrees better with her father's approximate age, who is known to have been between 30 and 40 years old in 1629, and therefore about 15 in 1509, probably too young.) She was the only daughter and heiress of James fitz Maurice FitzGerald by his wife Amy O'Brien. Her father was Earl of Desmond. He is here numbered the 10th, following the second edition of the Complete Peerage, but he is also numbered the 11th. Her father's family were the FitzGeralds of Desmond, a noble cadet branch of the Old English Geraldines, of which the FitzGeralds of Kildare were the senior branch.

Her mother was a daughter of Turlough O'Brien, a pre-reformation bishop of Killaloe (died 1525 or 1526), who had not stayed celibate. (Note: Joan's maternal grandfather must not be confused with his son, also called Turlough O'Brien, who was bishop of Killaloe 1554–1569, appointed during Queen Mary's reign.) Her mother's family were the O'Briens of Ara (County Tipperary), a cadet branch of the O'Briens, kings of Thomond.

By her father, Joan had two younger illegitimate half-sisters who are listed in her father's article.

== Father's feuds with neighbours ==
In the 1520s her father fought his neighbours, the lords of Muskerry in County Cork and the earls of Ormond in eastern Munster. He also quarrelled with his uncle Thomas fitz Thomas FitzGerald, called "the Bald", who sided with his enemies. In September 1520 or 1521 her father was defeated at the Battle of Mourne Abbey, south of Mallow, County Cork, by the allied forces of Cormac Laidir Oge MacCarthy, 10th Lord of Muskerry, and Thomas the Bald.

In December, Muskerry, Thomas the Bald, and Piers Butler, 8th Earl of Ormond, besieged her father unsuccessfully in Dungarvan.

== Inheritance ==
Joan FitzGerald's father, the 10th Earl, died on 18 June 1529. According to the Dictionary of Irish Biography he died at Rathkeale, County Limerick, most likely in the Castle Matrix. However, according to older sources he died at Dingle and was buried at Tralee. As the only legitimate child, Joan FitzGerald was heir general, but her granduncle Thomas the Bald, her father's enemy, was heir male and succeeded as 11th Earl of Desmond at the age of 75.

== First marriage and children ==
Joan FitzGerald's first husband was James Butler. He was the eldest son of Piers Butler, who had been in a dispute with Thomas Boleyn, over the estate and title of Ormond after the 7th Earl had died without a son in 1515. Piers Butler had in 1522 proposed his son as bridegroom for Anne Boleyn to settle the dispute. For reasons unknown, the marriage negotiations came to a halt, and Anne later married King Henry VIII as his second wife. In 1528 Henry VIII forced Piers Butler to renounce the title of Earl of Ormond and to become Earl of Ossory instead. Joan FitzGerald's new husband was therefore already in the middle of his thirties when he eventually married her in 1530. (Note: George Edward Cokayne in error gives a marriage date of 1520, which clashes with the date of 1522 given for his proposed marriage to Anne Boleyn.) Her dowry consisted of land in County Tipperary along the boundary between the Desmond and the Ormond possessions, including the manors of Clonmel, Kilfeakle, and Kilsheelan.

James and Joan had seven sons:

1. Thomas (c. 1532 – 1614), Black Tom, succeeded as the 10th Earl of Ormond, married firstly Elizabeth Berkeley; secondly, Elizabeth Sheffield, by whom he had an only daughter Elizabeth Preston, Countess of Desmond; thirdly, Helen Barry
2. Edmund of Cloughgrenan (1534–1602), married Eleanor Eustace, by whom he had issue
3. John of Kilcash (died 1570), married Katherine, daughter of Cormac na Haoine MacCarthy Reagh, 10th Prince of Carbery, by whom he had a son, Walter, 11th Earl of Ormond
4. Walter of Ballynodagh, became the ancestor of the Butlers of Nodstown
5. James of Duiske
6. Edward of Cloughinche, married Mary, second daughter of the Richard Burke, 4th Earl of Clanricarde, by whom he had issue
7. Piers of Grantstown

After the dramatic fall of the Boleyns, the earldom of Ormond reverted to her father-in-law in February 1538. On 26 August 1539 her husband succeeded as 9th Earl of Ormond and 2nd Earl of Ossory making her a double countess.

On 17 October 1546 Ormond went to dine at Ely House in Holborn, London. He fell victim of a mass poisoning along with his steward and 16 of his servants, possibly at the instigation of Anthony St Leger, who was Lord Deputy of Ireland and a political opponent. Ormond died on 28 October, leaving Lady Ormond a young dowager countess in her thirties. Thomas, the heir, was only 15 and therefore became a ward of the king. She travelled to London to make sure the wardship would be handled gently. As a widow, she could legally act independently and she regained control of her dowry. She administrated her dowry and jointure and played a major role in the affairs of house Ormond.

== Second marriage ==
In August 1548, she was persuaded to marry the English courtier and diplomat Francis Bryan. It is believed the marriage was a political maneuver to prevent Joan marrying her cousin, Gerald FitzGerald, heir to the Earldom of Desmond. Like her, Bryan had already been married once. His first wife had died childless in 1542. The union was not a happy one.

Nonetheless, Lady Ormond claimed the customary right to keep a private army of gallowglasses in Kilkenny, which greatly annoyed Edward Bellingham, who had replaced St Leger as lord deputy of Ireland on 22 April 1548.

The couple returned to Ireland in November 1549 and Bryan was appointed Lord Justice of Ireland on 27 December 1549 replacing Bellingham.

Due to his reputation as a rake and libertine at the English court, Sir Francis Bryan earned the nickname "Vicar of Hell". Joan is quoted as saying,

While I was a widow and not married [to] an Englishman, I defended and kept my own, or at the least, no man went about to defeat me of my right. Well is the woman unmarried; I am bade to hold my peace, and my husband shall have answer made unto him."

Bryan died suddenly on 2 February 1550, at Clonmel while travelling. Apparently he died at table after heavy drinking. Poisoning was suspected by some and a postmortem examination was held. While Bryan lay dying at Clonmel, Joan was allegedly out on a hunting expedition with her second cousin, Gerald FitzGerald. Lady Joan was prevailed upon to wait a year before marrying Gerald.

== Third marriage ==
The precise date of her third marriage does not seem to be known. She did not wait long. Her third husband was her second cousin Gerald FitzGerald. The common ancestor was Thomas FitzGerald, 7th Earl of Desmond, great-grandfather to both. Gerald was the heir apparent of James FitzGerald, the reigning Earl of Desmond, numbered the 13th. She was about 41 while he was about 17. In 1551 her son Thomas was given livery of the Ormond estate.

The marriage brought about a temporary peace in Ireland between the rival families of Butler and FitzGerald. On 14 October 1558 Gerald succeeded to the earldom becoming the 14th, 15th, or 16th Earl of Desmond depending on the numbering. (Note: Cokayne numbers Gerald as the 14th earl of Desmond, whereas Burke just like McCormack (Dictionary of Irish Biography) numbers him as the 15th, whereas Bagwell and James Wills call him the 16th.) This made Joan Countess of Desmond. She used her considerable talent for diplomacy to act as a "peacemaker" between her eldest son and her third husband.

== Desmond–Ormond feud ==
Joan maintained a friendly correspondence with Queen Elizabeth, who recognised her ability, and relied on her to restore and keep the precarious peace in Munster after her husband, allegedly tired of Joan's domination over him, broke the truce with her eldest son, Thomas, who had succeeded his father as Earl of Ormond. After the two factions began making raids against one another, Joan spent nearly two weeks journeying back and forth on horseback to arbitrate between the two enemy camps, before a tenuous peace was finally re-established in 1560. In 1562, her husband was sent to the Tower of London for his allegedly "insolent" behaviour before the Privy Council. Joan worked hard to persuade the queen to release him. She was eventually successful and her husband returned to Ireland in November 1563.

In 1560 her intervention secured a peaceful outcome to a stand-off near Tipperary, known as "the battle that never was".

== Death and timeline ==
Lady Desmond died on 2 January 1565 at Askeaton, County Limerick. She was buried at the Franciscan Friary of Askeaton. After her death the relationship between Dermond and Ormond deteriorated rapidly. On 8 February 1565 they fought the Battle of Affane where her Butler son took her widower captive. The ensuing Desmond rebellions earned her widower the sobriquet of "rebel earl" and ended with his forfeiture and killing in 1583.

Timeline
As her birth date is uncertain, so are all her ages.
Age	Date	Event
0	1514, estimate	Born
5–6	1520, Sep	Father lost the Battle of Mourne against Cormac Laidir Oge MacCarthy, 10th Lord of Muskerry
14–15	1529, 18 Jun	Father died. Her granduncle Thomas FitzGerald succeeded as 11th Earl of Desmond.
15–16	1530	Married James Butler, her 1st husband
21–22	1536, 23 Feb	Leonard Grey, 1st Viscount Grane, appointed Lord Deputy of Ireland
24–25	1539, 26 Aug	Became countess of Ormond as her husband succeeded as 9th Earl of Ormond
25–26	1540, 7 Jul	Anthony St Leger, appointed Lord Deputy of Ireland (1st term)
31–32	1546, 28 Oct	1st husband died at Ely House, London.
32–33	1547, 28 Jan	Accession of Edward VI, succeeding Henry VIII
33–34	1548	Married Francis Bryan, her 2nd husband
33–34	1548, 22 Apr	Edward Bellingham, appointed Lord Deputy of Ireland
34–35	1549, 27 Dec	2nd husband appointed Lord Justice of Ireland.
35–36	1550, 2 Feb	2nd husband died at Clonmel.
35–36	1509, 2 Feb	William Brabazon, appointed Lord Justice of Ireland.
35–36	1550, 4 Aug	Anthony St Leger, appointed Lord Deputy of Ireland (2nd term)
35–36	1550	Married Gerald FitzGerald, her third husband
36–37	1551, 27 Oct	Son given livery of the Ormond estate.
38–39	1553, 6 Jul	Accession of Queen Mary I, succeeding Edward VI of England
38–39	1553, 1 Sep	Anthony St Leger, appointed Lord Deputy of Ireland (3rd term)
43–44	1558, 14 Oct	Became countess of Desmond as her husband succeeded as 14th Earl of Desmond
43–44	1558, 17 Nov	Accession of Queen Elizabeth I, succeeding Queen Mary I
45–46	1560	Prevented a battle at the standoff between Desmond and Ormond forces near Tipperary.
50–51	1565, 2 Jan	Died

== Notes and references ==
=== Sources ===
- Bagwell, Richard (1885). Ireland under the Tudors. Vol. I. London: Longmans, Green, and Co. OCLC 761857292. – 1534 to 1558
- Beresford, David (October 2009a). McGuire, James; Quinn, James (eds.). "Bryan, Francis". Dictionary of Irish Biography.
- Beresford, David (October 2009b). McGuire, James; Quinn, James (eds.). "FitzGerald, James fitz Maurice". Dictionary of Irish Biography.
- Berleth, Richard (1994). The Twilight Lords. London: Allen Lane. ISBN 978-0-7139-1186-2.
- Brigden, Susan (2004). "Bryan, Sir Francis [called the Vicar of Hell] (d. 1550)". In Matthew, Henry Colin Gray.; Harrison, Brian (eds.). Oxford Dictionary of National Biography. Vol. 8. New York: Oxford University Press. pp. 379–380. ISBN 0-19-861411-X.
- Burke, Bernard (1866). A Genealogical History of the Dormant, Abeyant, Forfeited and Extinct Peerages of the British Empire (New ed.). London: Harrison. OCLC 11501348.
- Burke, Bernard; Burke, Ashworth Peter (1915). A Genealogical and Heraldic History of the Peerage and Baronetage, the Privy Council, Knightage and Companionage (77th ed.). London: Harrison. OCLC 1155471554.
- Butler, William F. T. (1929). "The Descendants of James, Ninth Earl of Ormond". The Journal of the Royal Society of Antiquaries of Ireland. 6th. 19 (1): 29–44. JSTOR 25513504.
- Cokayne, George Edward (1890). Complete Peerage of England, Scotland, Ireland, Great Britain and the United Kingdom, Extant, Extinct, or Dormant. Vol. III (1st ed.). London: George Bell and Sons. OCLC 1180838776. – D to F
- Cokayne, George Edward (1895). Complete Peerage of England, Scotland, Ireland, Great Britain and the United Kingdom, Extant, Extinct, or Dormant. Vol. VI (1st ed.). London: George Bell and Sons. OCLC 1180818801. – N to R
- Cokayne, George Edward (1916). Gibbs, Vicary (ed.). The complete peerage of England, Scotland, Ireland, Great Britain and the United Kingdom, extant, extinct, or dormant. Vol. IV (2nd ed.). London: St Catherine Press. OCLC 228661424. – Dacre to Dysart (for Desmond)
- Duffy, Damien (2021). Aristocratic Women in Ireland 1450-1660: The Ormond Family, Power and Politics. Woodbridge: Boydell & Brewer. ISBN 978-1-78327-593-9.
- Eckerle, Julie A.; McAreavey, Naomi, eds. (2019). Women's Life Writing and Early Modern Ireland. Lincoln: University of Nebraska Press. ISBN 978-0-8032-9997-9. – (Preview)
- Edwards, David (1998). The Ormond Lordship in County Kilkenny, 1515–1642 (Ph.D.). Dublin: Trinity College. hdl:2262/77139. – (PDF downloadable from given URL)
- Ellis, Steven G. (2014). Ireland in the Age of the Tudors, 1447–1603 (2nd ed.). Abingdon: Routledge. ISBN 978-1-317-90143-3. – (Preview)
- Fraser, Antonia (1994) [1st pub. 1992]. The Wives of Henry VIII. New York: Vintage Books. ISBN 978-0-679-73001-9.
- Fryde, Edmund Boleslaw; Greenway, D. E.; Porter, S.; Roy, I., eds. (1986). Handbook of British Chronology. Royal Historical Society Guides and Handbooks, No. 2 (3rd ed.). London: Offices of the Royal Historical Society. ISBN 0-86193-106-8. – (for timeline)
- Holland, Karen Ann (July 1995). Joan Desmond, Ormond, and Ossory: The world of a countess in sixteenth-century Ireland (Ph.D.). Providence, RI: Providence College. OCLC 37313336. ProQuest 304325204. – Document Preview
- Holland, Karen Ann (1996). Joan Desmond, Ormond, and Ossory: The world of a countess in sixteenth-century Ireland (Ph.D.). Providence, RI: Providence College. OCLC 37313336. – Online abstract
- Joyce, Patrick Weston (1903). A Concise History of Ireland from the Earliest Times to 1837 (12th ed.). Dublin: M. H. Gill & Son. OCLC 815623752.
- Kirwan, John (2000). "Lady Joan FitzGerald, countess of Ormond, Ossory and Desmond". Journal of the Butler Society. 4: 292–302.
- McCormack, Anthony M. (October 2009a). McGuire, James; Quinn, James (eds.). "FitzGerald, Gerald fitz James". Dictionary of Irish Biography.
- McCormack, Anthony M. (October 2009b). McGuire, James; Quinn, James (eds.). "FitzGerald, Thomas". Dictionary of Irish Biography. – "The bald", earl of Desmond
- McCormack, Anthony M. (October 2009c). "MacCarthy (Mac Carthaigh), Cormac Óg Láidir". Dictionary of Irish Biography.
- McGurk, J. J. N. (2004). "FitzGerald, Gerald fitz James, fourteenth earl of Desmond (c. 1533–1583)". In Matthew, Colin; Harrison, Brian (eds.). Oxford Dictionary of National Biography. Vol. 19. New York: Oxford University Press. pp. 809–811. ISBN 0-19-861369-5.
- Moody, Theodore William; Martin, F. X.; Byrne, Francis John, eds. (1984). A New History of Ireland. Vol. IX:Maps, Genealogies, Lists. Oxford: Oxford University Press. ISBN 0-19-821745-5.
- O'Brien, Donough (1949). History of the O'Briens from Boroimhe. Batsford: self-published. OCLC 1157152182.
- Wills, Rev. James (1840a). "James, 11th Earl of Desmond". Lives of illustrious and distinguished Irishmen, from the earliest times to the present period. Vol. I. Dublin: MacGregor, Polson & Co. pp. 452–453.
- Wills, Rev. James (1840b). "Gerald Sixteenth Earl of Desmond". Lives of illustrious and distinguished Irishmen, from the earliest times to the present period. Vol. II. Dublin: MacGregor, Polson & Co. pp. 11–40.
- Wilson, Philip (1912). The Beginnings of Modern Ireland. Dublin: Maunsel and Company Ltd. OCLC 1041051033.
- Wright, Stephen (2004). "Butler, James, ninth earl of Ormond and second earl of Ossory (b. in or after 1496, d. 1546)". In Matthew, Henry Colin Gray.; Harrison, Brian (eds.). Oxford Dictionary of National Biography. Vol. 9. New York: Oxford University Press. pp. 151–153. ISBN 0-19-861359-8.
