= James FitzGerald, 10th Earl of Desmond =

Irish lord (died 1529)

James FitzGerald
- Earl of Desmond
- Tenure: 1520–1529
- Predecessor: Maurice, 9th Earl
- Successor: Thomas, 11th Earl
- Died: 18 June 1529; Dingle
- Buried: Tralee
- Spouse: Amy Mac-i-Brien Ara
- Issue Detail: Joan (Amy)
- Father: Maurice, 9th Earl
- Mother: Ellen Roche

James fitz Maurice FitzGerald, 10th Earl of Desmond (died 1529), also counted as the 11th, plotted against King Henry VIII with King Francis I of France in 1523 and with Emperor Charles V in 1528 and 1529.

== Birth and origins ==
James was born about 1490 (Note: The subject of the article was between 30 and 40 years old in 1629.) in Munster, Ireland, second but only surviving son of Maurice FitzGerald and his first wife Ellen Roche. His father was Earl of Desmond, counted the 9th or the 10th, and called "the Lame", "Vehiculus", and "Bellicosus". His father's family were the FitzGeralds of Desmond, a noble cadet branch of the FitzGeralds or Geraldines, which were Old English descending from Maurice FitzGerald, Lord of Llanstephan, who had come to Ireland with Strongbow in 1169. The FitzGeralds of Kildare were the senior branch of that family.

His mother was a daughter of Maurice Roche, 2nd Lord of Fermoy and his first wife Joan FitzGerald. His mother's family, the Roches also were Old English and descended from Adam de Rupe who had come to Ireland from Wales with Robert FitzStephen.

James had an elder brother Thomas, who was heir apparent but predeceased his father. He also had sisters. All his sisters are listed in his father's article.

Family tree

James fitz Maurice FitzGerald with wife, parents, and other selected relatives. (Note: This family tree is based on a graphic tree an on written genealogies of the earls of Desmond and Ormond.)

Thomas; 7th Earl d. 1468 of Drogheda
James; 8th Earl; 1459–1487	Maurice; 9th Earl d. 1520 the Lame	Thomas; 11th Earl; 1454–1534 the Bald	John de facto 12th Earl d. 1536
Piers; 8th Earl; 1467–1539	James; 10th Earl d. 1529	Amy; O'Brien	Maurice fitz Thomas d. 1529 d.v.p.*	James; 13th Earl d. 1558
James; Butler; 9th Earl; 1496–1546	Joan; FitzGerald d. 1565	James; 12th Earl d. 1540; Court Page	Gerald; 14th Earl c. 1533 – 1583; Rebel Earl
Thomas; 10th Earl c. 1531 – 1614; Black Tom	John of Kilcash d. 1570

Legend

XXX	Subject of the article	XXX	Earls of Desmond	XXX	Earls of Ormond

*d.v.p. = predeceased his father (decessit vita patris).

== Marriage and children ==
James married Amy, daughter of Turlough O'Brien, a pre-reformation bishop of Killaloe (died 1525 or 1526), who was not celibate. (Note: Joan's maternal grandfather must not be confused with his son, also called Turlough O'Brien, who was bishop of Killaloe 1554–1569, appointed during Queen Mary I's reign.) Her mother's family were the O'Briens of Ara (County Tipperary), a cadet branch of the O'Briens, kings of Thomond.

James and Amy had an only daughter:

1. Joan (Amy) (1509 or 1514 – 1565), married 1st James Butler, 9th Earl of Ormond; 2ndly Francis Bryan, and 3rdly Gerald FitzGerald, 14th Earl of Desmond

James also had two illegitimate half-sisters from his father:

1. Honora (d. 1577), illegitimate
2. Ellice, illegitimate

== Earldom and feuds with neighbours ==
FitzGerald's father seems to have already relied on him in the governing of the earldom in his later years. In 1520 his father died and was buried in the Dominican friary of Tralee, which had been founded in 1243 by his ancestor John fitz Thomas FitzGerald, 1st Baron Desmond. FitzGerald succeeded his father as Earl of Desmond, counted as the 10th or the 11th earl.

In the 1520s Desmond, as he now was, fought his neighbours, the lords of Muskerry in County Cork and the earls of Ormond in eastern Munster. He also quarrelled with his uncle Thomas fitz Thomas FitzGerald, called "the Bald", who sided with his enemies. In September 1521 Desmond was defeated at the Battle of Mourne Abbey, south of Mallow, County Cork, by the allied forces of Cormac Laidir MacCarthy, 9th Lord of Muskerry, and Thomas the Bald.

In December, Muskerry, Thomas the Bald, and Piers Butler, 8th Earl of Ormond, besieged him in Dungarvan.

== Francis I of France ==
During the Italian War of 1521–1526 that opposed England as an ally of the Habsburgs against France, Desmond conspired in 1522 with King Francis I of France against his liege, King Henry VIII, recognizing Richard de la Pole as king of England and discussing a possible French invasion of Ireland. An attainder against Desmond was drafted in 1522 but never passed parliament.

In 1525 the King sent Gerald FitzGerald, 9th Earl of Kildare, Lord Deputy of Ireland, with an army to arrest Desmond for treason, but Desmond evaded capture.

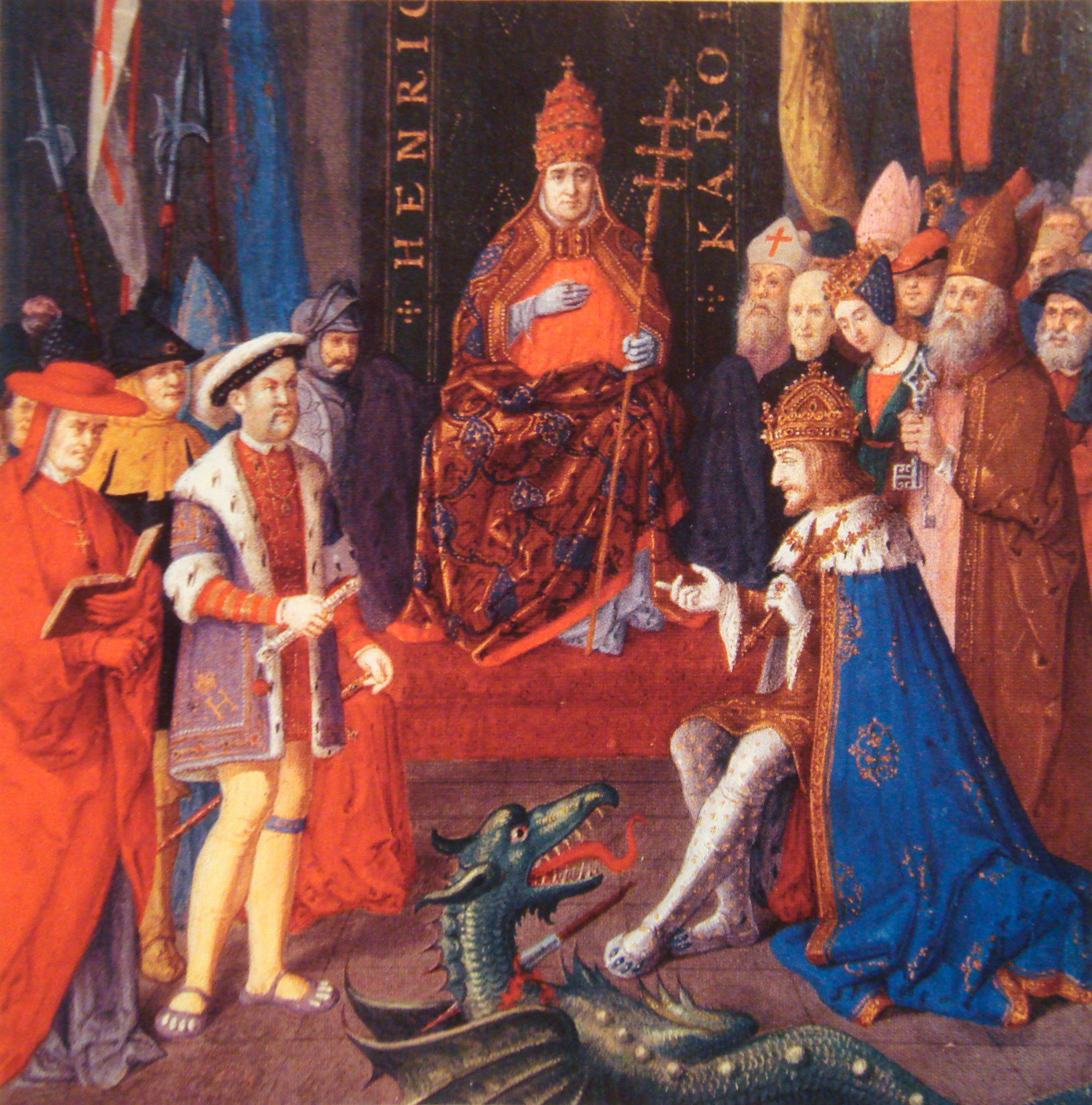
His enemy Henry VIII and his ally Charles V with Pope Leo X de' Medici

== Charles Quint ==
By the Treaty of the More in 1525 Henry VIII ended the war with France and then in 1527 by the treaty of Westminster reversed the alliance, now fighting in the War of the League of Cognac (1526–1530) as an ally of France against Charles V. Desmond reacted by also changing sides and allied himself with Emperor Charles V in 1528 and 1529 The Emperor sent his chaplain Gonzalo Fernandez to see Desmond at Dingle. The chaplain reported that the earl was between 30 and 40 years old.

== Death and timeline ==
Desmond died unexpectedly on 18 June 1529 at Rathkeale or at Dingle. He was buried with his father at Tralee, His death without a male heir provoked a succession crisis. His daughter was heir general but his uncle Thomas, called the Bald, succeeded as 11th Earl of Desmond. His widow married Edmond Fitzmaurice, 9th Baron of Kerry and Lixnaw as his second wife and died in 1537.

Timeline
As his birth date is uncertain, so are all his ages.
Age	Date	Event
0	1493, estimate	Born
20–21	1514	Daughter Joan born.
1–2	1495	Father besieges Waterford trying to impose Perkin Warbeck as Yorkist king but fails.
15–16	1509, 22 Apr	Accession of Henry VIII, succeeding Henry VII of England
26–27	1521, Sep	Lost the Battle of Mourne to Cormac Laidir Oge MacCarthy, 10th Lord of Muskerry
28–29	1522	Plotted with King Francis I of France
31–32	1525	Avoided arrest by Gerald FitzGerald, 9th Earl of Kildare
35–36	1529	Plotted with Emperor Charles V
35–36	1529, 18 Jun	Died. His uncle Thomas FitzGerald succeeded as 11th Earl of Desmond.

Ancestors of James FitzGerald, 10th Earl of Desmond

Gerald FitzGerald, 3rd Earl of Desmond
James FitzGerald, 6th Earl of Desmond
Eleanor Butler
Thomas FitzGerald, 7th Earl of Desmond
Mary de Burgh
Maurice FitzGerald, 9th Earl of Desmond
William Barry, 8th Baron Barry
Ellice de Barry
Ellen Roche
James FitzGerald, 10th Earl of Desmond
David Roche 1st Lord of Fermoy
Maurice Roche, 2nd Lord Fermoy
Joanna de Burgo
Ellen Roche
Joan FitzGerald

== Notes and references ==
=== Sources ===
- Beckett, James Camlin (1973) [1952]. A Short History of Ireland (5th ed.). London: Hutchinson & Co. ISBN 0-09-118870-9.
- Beresford, David (October 2009). McGuire, James; Quinn, James (eds.). "FitzGerald, James fitz Maurice". Dictionary of Irish Biography.
- Burke, Bernard (1866). A Genealogical History of the Dormant, Abeyant, Forfeited and Extinct Peerages of the British Empire (New ed.). London: Harrison. OCLC 11501348. (for Desmond and Fermoy)
- Burke, Bernard; Burke, Ashworth Peter (1915). A Genealogical and Heraldic History of the Peerage and Baronetage, the Privy Council, Knightage and Companionage (77th ed.). London: Harrison. OCLC 1155471554.
- Cokayne, George Edward (1916). Gibbs, Vicary (ed.). The complete peerage of England, Scotland, Ireland, Great Britain and the United Kingdom, extant, extinct, or dormant. Vol. IV (2nd ed.). London: St Catherine Press. OCLC 228661424. – Dacre to Dysart (for Desmond)
- Cokayne, George Edward (1926). Gibbs, Vicary (ed.). The complete peerage of England, Scotland, Ireland, Great Britain and the United Kingdom, extant, extinct, or dormant. Vol. V (2nd ed.). London: St Catherine Press. OCLC 228661424. – Eardley of Spalding to Goojerat (for Fermoy)
- Cokayne, George Edward (1929). Doubleday, H. A. (ed.). The complete peerage of England, Scotland, Ireland, Great Britain and the United Kingdom, extant, extinct, or dormant. Vol. VII (2nd ed.). London: St Catherine Press. – Hussey to Lincolnshire (for Kerry)
- Coleman, Ambrose (1902). The Ancient Dominican Foundations of Ireland; an Appendix to O'Heyn's "Epilogus Chronologicus". Dundalk: William Tempest.
- Eckerle, Julie A.; McAreavey, Naomi, eds. (2019). Women's Life Writing and Early Modern Ireland. Lincoln: University of Nebraska Press. ISBN 978-0-8032-9997-9. – (Preview)
- Ellis, Steven G. (2014). Ireland in the Age of the Tudors, 1447–1603 (2nd ed.). Abingdon: Routledge. ISBN 978-1-317-90143-3. – (Preview)
- FitzGerald, Charles William (1858). The Earls of Kildare and their Ancestors: from 1057 to 1773 (2nd ed.). Dublin: Hodges Smith & Co. OCLC 697725153.
- Fryde, E. B.; Greenway, D. E.; Porter, S.; Roy, I., eds. (1986). Handbook of British Chronology. Royal Historical Society Guides and Handbooks, No. 2 (3rd ed.). London: Offices of the Royal Historical Society. ISBN 0-86193-106-8. – (for timeline)
- Holland, Karen Ann (1996). Joan Desmond, Ormond, and Ossory: The world of a countess in sixteenth-century Ireland (Ph.D.). Providence, RI: Providence College. – Online abstract
- Joyce, Patrick Weston (1903). A Concise History of Ireland from the Earliest Times to 1837 (12th ed.). Dublin: M. H. Gill & Son. OCLC 815623752.
- Loades, David Michael (2009). Henry VIII: Court, church and conflict. Kew: National Archives. ISBN 978-1-905615-42-1.
- McCormack, Anthony M. (October 2009). McGuire, James; Quinn, James (eds.). "FitzGerald, Thomas". Dictionary of Irish Biography. – "The bald", earl of Desmond
- McGee, Thomas d'Arcy (1863). A Popular History of Ireland: From the Earliest Period to the Emancipation of the Catholics. Vol. I. New York: D. & J. Sadlier. – Earliest times to 1568
- Moody, Theodore William; Martin, F. X.; Byrne, Francis John, eds. (1984). A New History of Ireland. Vol. IX:Maps, Genealogies, Lists. Oxford: Oxford University Press. ISBN 0-19-821745-5.
- O'Brien, Donough (1949). History of the O'Briens from Boroimhe. Batsford: self-published. OCLC 1157152182.
- Webb, Alfred (1878). "FitzGerald, James, 11th Earl of Desmond". Compendium of Irish Biography. Dublin: M. H. Gill & Son. p. 139, left column. OCLC 122693688.
- Wilson, Philip (1912). The Beginnings of Modern Ireland. Dublin: Maunsel and Company Ltd. OCLC 1041051033.

Peerage of Ireland
Preceded by Maurice fitz Thomas FitzGerald	Earl of Desmond; 1520–1529	Succeeded by Thomas fitz Thomas FitzGerald
