= Eleanor Butler, Countess of Desmond =

Irish countess (died 1636)

Eleanor Butler
- Countess of Desmond
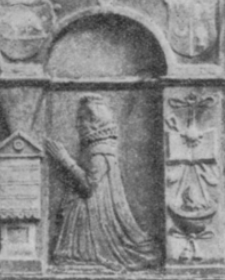
- Detail of monument in Sligo Abbey
- Born: c. 1545; Kiltinan Castle
- Died: 1636
- Buried: Sligo Abbey
- Spouses: 1. Gerald, 14th Earl of Desmond; 2. Donough O'Connor Sligo
- Issue Detail: James FitzGerald, 1st Earl of Desmond & others
- Father: Edmund Butler, 1st/11th Baron Dunboyne
- Mother: Cecilia MacCarthy Reagh

Hon. Eleanor Butler (c. 1545 – c.1636) was countess of Desmond during her marriage to Gerald FitzGerald. She administrated the earldom during her husbands long absence in captivity. She became involved in the conflicts within the Irish aristocracy and the English Crown.

== Birth and origins ==
Eleanor was born at Kiltinan Castle, County Tipperary, in about 1545. Her mother was Cecilia MacCarthy Reagh and her father was Edmund Butler, the baron Dunboyne.

== First marriage ==
Early in 1565, she became the second wife of Gerald FitzGerald, the Earl of Desmond. She could speak Irish and English and her education was by private tutors. Her new husband had only recently become a widower and the marriage had several advantages. The Desmonds and the Butlers were traditional enemies of each other. Her husband received a sizable dowry and in return she received the town of Bridgeford in County Carlow which came complete with a castle. After the wedding they lived briefly together at Askeaton castle before her husband decided to do battle against the Ormonde family at the Battle of Affane. He lost and he was captured. She found herself in charge of the estate until he returned late in 1565. She was in charge of the estate again in 1568. Her husband and his brother, John, had been placed in the Tower of London the year before and there was a dispute about who should look after their estates. Butler had the two claimants arrested and she took over the administration.

Her success was well received and it was proposed by the English that she should continue to manage the earldom partnered by the Limerick Bishop Hugh Lacy. It was her decision to release James FitzMaurice FitzGerald and not allow him to be extradited by the crown. He had been one of the claimants to administer the estate she had arrested. He had been her husband's favourite and she felt he had the authority to carry out the task. He did not respect her gift and in time he appeared to be manoeuvring to become the Earl. Butler decided that her best option was to go to England to gain her husband's freedom. The Queen met her but she ignored her pleas and Butler went to live with her imprisoned husband. Her husband's brother and fellow prisoner, John, would have been disappointed that she gave birth to "a son and heir" while in England as this meant that he had little chance of ever becoming the Earl.

Her husband eventually escaped back to Ireland where he challenged the rule of the crown. She acted as a go-between for her husband and the crown's representatives. In 1588 she surrendered to the crown and her husband was killed in the same year. She was given a Royal Pardon on condition that she gave up any claim on the earldom. She hoped that her son might become Earl but he (eventually) died in London in 1601.

== Second marriage ==
She remarried to Donough O'Connor Sligo who was an Irish Lord at the suggestion of Sir Robert Cecil.

In 1613 she was living off her earnings from the Sligo estate which another objected to. She persuaded the judge that she was old and he awarded the case in her favour. Not too old as she lived for another 25 years.

== Death and legacy ==
She had a large memorial built in Sligo Abbey in 1624 where she was, in time, buried with her second husband. It is thought she died at her Ballycor Castle and she was alive in 1638 when she wrote her last will.

Her biography, Eleanor, Countess of Desmond, C. 1545-1638, was written in 1986.
