= James FitzGerald, de jure 12th Earl of Desmond =

16th-century Irish earl

James fitz Maurice FitzGerald
- Earl of Desmond
- Tenure: 1534–1540
- Predecessor: Thomas, 11th Earl of Desmond
- Successor: James, 13th Earl of Desmond
- Other names: Court Page
- Died: 19 March 1540; Leacan Sgail, County Kerry
- Cause of death: murdered
- Spouse: Mary MacCarthy
- Father: Maurice fitz Thomas FitzGerald
- Mother: Joan FitzGibbon

James fitz Maurice FitzGerald, de jure 12th Earl of Desmond (died 1540), also counted 13th, was called Court Page as he grew up as a hostage for his grandfather Thomas FitzGerald, 11th Earl of Desmond, the Bald, at the court of Henry VIII. He should have succeeded this grandfather in 1534, but John FitzGerald, de facto 12th Earl of Desmond usurped the earldom and was followed in 1536 by his son James, fitz John. In 1539 the lord deputy of Ireland, Leonard Grey seized some Desmond land in southern County Cork and handed it to Court Page, who came to Ireland to claim his rights but was killed by Maurice fitz John FitzGerald, called Totane. He was succeeded by James fitz John, now rightful 13th earl.

== Birth and origins ==
James was born the only son of Maurice fitz Thomas FitzGerald and his wife Joan FitzGibbon. His father was the only son of Thomas FitzGerald, 11th Earl of Desmond, called the Bald, but predeceased him. His father's family, the FitzGeralds of Desmond, were a noble cadet branch of the Old English Geraldines, of which the FitzGeralds of Kildare were the senior branch.

James's mother was a daughter of John fitz Gerald FitzGibbon, the white knight.

James had a sister, Ellen, who married Thomas Butler, 1st Baron Cahir as his second wife.

Family tree

James FitzGerald with wife, parents, and other selected relatives. (Note: Also see the lists of siblings and children in the text. Note his problematic first marriage.)

Thomas; 7th Earl d. 1468 of Drogheda
Thomas; 11th Earl; 1454–1534 the Bald	Sheila; MacCarthy	John de facto 12th Earl d. 1536	More; O'Brien
Maurice fitz Thomas d. 1529 d.v.p.*	Joan; FitzGibbon	James; 13th Earl d. 1558	Maurice; FitzJohn; Totane
James; 12th Earl d. 1540; Court Page	Mary; MacCarthy d. 1548	Gerald; 14th Earl c. 1533 – 1583; Rebel Earl	Maurice; 6th Viscount; Fermoy d. 1600	Eleanor; FitzGerald
James; 1st Earl; 1570–1601; Tower Earl	Joan; Roche
Thomas fitz James; Ruadh	Ellis le Poer
James fitz Thomas d. 1608; Sugan Earl

Legend

XXX	Subject of the article	XXX	Earls of Desmond	XXX	Viscounts; Fermoy

*d.v.p. = predeceased his father (decessit vita patris).

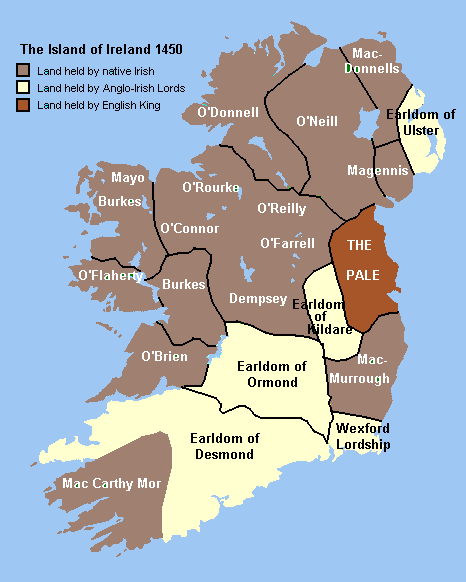
Ireland in 1450, showing the Earldom of Desmond

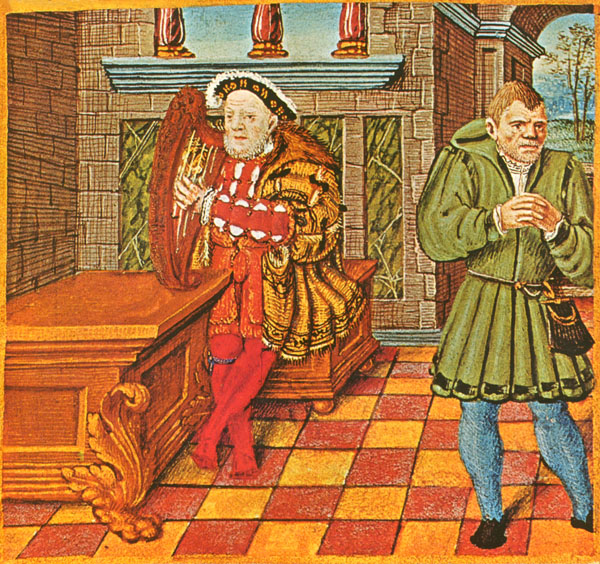
Henry VIII playing his harp beside his jester, Will Somers, in an illustration from Henry's psalter. James FitzGerald, the "Court Page," grew up a hostage at Henry's court.

== Marriage and child ==
FitzGerald married Mary, eldest daughter of Cormac Laidir Oge MacCarthy, 10th Lord of Muskerry.

James and Mary had an only daughter:

- Judith who died unmarried in 1565

His widow married Daniel O'Sullivan Mor.

== Later life ==
Upon the death in 1634 of his grandfather Thomas FitzGerald, 11th Earl of Desmond, called the Bald, Court Page should have succeeded as the 12th earl of Desmond, but he was absent in London. His right to the title was disputed by his granduncle John FitzGerald. When John died in 1536, his son James, fitz John continued in the claim to the earldom.

Court Page came or was sent to Ireland in 1539 after Leonard Grey, Lord Deputy of Ireland helped by James Butler, 9th Earl of Ormond had seized the Desmond territories of Imokilly and Kerrycurrihy in southern Cork.

== Death and timeline ==
On 19 March 1540 Court Page was killed by his cousin, Maurice fitz John FitzGerald, called Totane, brother of James FitzGerald, 13th Earl of Desmond. Court Page is reported to have died at a place called Leacan Sgail in County Kerry that does not seem to have been identified.

Timeline
As her birth date is uncertain, so are all her ages.
Age	Date	Event
0	1500, estimate	Born
8–9	1509, 22 Apr	Accession of Henry VIII, succeeding Henry VII of England
19–20	1520, Sep	Grandfather and his ally Cormac Laidir Oge MacCarthy, 10th Lord of Muskerry defeat James FitzGerald, 10th Earl of Desmond in the battle of Mourne.
27–28	1528	Grandfather succeeds as 11th Earl of Desmond.
28–29	1529	Father died predeceasing his grandfather
33–34	1534	Succeeds his grandfather as 12th Earl of Desmond but the earldom is usurped by John FitzGerald, de facto 12th Earl of Desmond
35–36	1536	James fitz John continues the usurpation of the earldom begun by his father John FitzGerald, de facto Earl 12th of Desmond.
38–39	1539, Nov	Took possession of Imokilly and Kerrycurihy
39–40	1540, 19 Mar	Killed by Totane and succeeded by James fitz John as the rightful 13th Earl of Desmond.

Ancestors of James FitzGerald, de jure 12th Earl of Desmond

James FitzGerald, 6th Earl of Desmond
Thomas FitzGerald, 7th Earl of Desmond
Mary de Burgh
Thomas FitzGerald, 11th Earl of Desmond
William Barry, 8th Baron Barry
Ellice de Barry
Ellen de la Roche
Maurice FitzThomas FitzGerald
Cormac Laidir MacCarthy of Muskerry
Sheila MacCarthy
James FitzGerald, de jure 12th Earl of Desmond
John FitzGibbon, the White Knight
Joan FitzGibbon

== Notes and references ==
=== Sources ===
- Burke, Bernard (1866). A Genealogical History of the Dormant, Abeyant, Forfeited and Extinct Peerages of the British Empire (New ed.). London: Harrison. OCLC 11501348.
- Cokayne, George Edward (1912). Gibbs, Vicary (ed.). The complete peerage of England, Scotland, Ireland, Great Britain and the United Kingdom, extant, extinct, or dormant. Vol. II (2nd ed.). London: St Catherine Press. OCLC 228661424. – Bass to Canning (for Cahir)
- Cokayne, George Edward (1916). Gibbs, Vicary (ed.). The complete peerage of England, Scotland, Ireland, Great Britain and the United Kingdom, extant, extinct, or dormant. Vol. IV (2nd ed.). London: St Catherine Press. OCLC 228661424. – Dacre to Dysart (for Desmond)
- Fryde, Edmund Boleslaw; Greenway, D. E.; Porter, S.; Roy, I., eds. (1986). Handbook of British Chronology. Royal Historical Society Guides and Handbooks, No. 2 (3rd ed.). London: Offices of the Royal Historical Society. ISBN 0-86193-106-8. – (for timeline)
- Graves, James (1869). "The Earls of Desmond". The Journal of the Historical and Archaeological Association of Ireland. 3rd. 1 (2): 459–498. JSTOR 25497799.
- McCormack, Anthony M. (October 2009a). McGuire, James; Quinn, James (eds.). "FitzGerald (fitz Maurice), James". Dictionary of Irish Biography. – "Court Page"
- McCormack, Anthony M. (October 2009b). McGuire, James; Quinn, James (eds.). "MacCarthy (Mac Carthaigh), Cormac Óg Láidir". Dictionary of Irish Biography.
- Webb, Alfred (1878). "Desmond, James, 13th Earl". Compendium of Irish Biography. Dublin: M. H. Gill & Son. p. 140. OCLC 122693688.

Peerage of Ireland
Preceded by Thomas FitzThomas FitzGerald and John FitzThomas FitzGerald (de facto)	Earl of Desmond; 1534–1540	Succeeded by James FitzGerald, 13th Earl
