= Katherine FitzGerald, Countess of Desmond =

Irish noblewoman

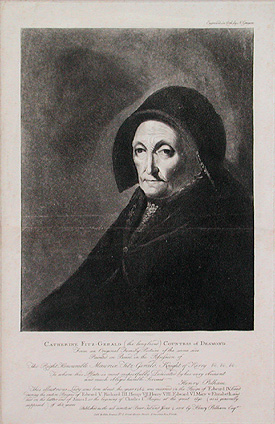
Nathaniel Grogan's 1806 engraving of Lord Kerry's portrait of Katherine, Countess of Desmond

Katherine or Catherine FitzGerald (Irish: Caitríona Nic Gearailt; died 1604), Countess of Desmond after her 1529 marriage to her cousin Thomas FitzGerald and popularly known as the Old Countess of Desmond for her extreme longevity, was a noblewoman of the Hiberno-Norman FitzGerald dynasty in Ireland.

Probably born in the early 1500s, she was likely at least 90 years old when she died and possibly near 100. This longevity was widely discussed by English writers of the Tudor period, including Sir Walter Raleigh, and longevity myths grew up that claimed she was a supercentenarian over 120 years old or even over 140.

== Life ==
Lady Desmond was the daughter of Sir John FitzGerald, second Lord of Decies in Waterford, and Ellen Fitzgibbon. She was probably born at Dromana, in County Waterford. In 1529, she married, becoming the second wife of Thomas FitzGerald, 11th Earl of Desmond (1454–1534), "her cousin german once removed", and a man some fifty years her senior. (His previous wife had been Síle Ní Chormaic, daughter of Cormac Láidir Mac Cárthaigh, builder of Blarney Castle.) The couple had a single daughter, also named Katherine, and she remained a widow following the death of her husband in 1534.

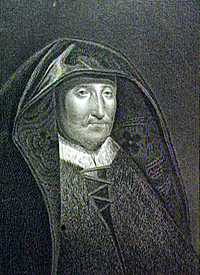
Engraving after a painted portrait which has been claimed to be that of Katherine, Countess of Desmond (the Dromana Portrait)

In later life, Lady Desmond was party to a property dispute typical of late-Tudor Ireland (1485–1603). Her husband had granted her a life tenancy in Inchiquin Castle, about 5 miles southwest of the town of Youghal, in Munster. Upon the Countess Desmond's death the castle was to revert to the line of the Earls of Desmond. In 1575, she passed title to the castle and lands in trust, by deed, to the incumbent earl, Gerald FitzGerald, who then passed it in trust to his dependants. (The Earl, who was in rebellion against the Crown, wished to avoid confiscation of his lands by placing them in the legal guardianship of others.) The estate of Inchiquin was described at the time as "the castle and towne of Inchiquaine, with arable land called the six free plowelands in Inchiquaine, together with mores, meadowes, pastures, groves, woodds, mill places, with their watercourses, rivers, streams, with their weares and fisheryes".

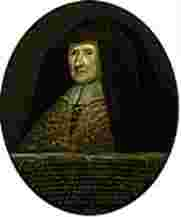
National Portrait Gallery, 18th century copy of a supposed portrait of the Countess of Desmond

Following the earl's attainder in 1582, whereby his estate fell to the Crown after the Desmond Rebellions, Inchiquin Castle and its lands were granted to New England colonist Sir Walter Raleigh who then leased out some of the land while preserving the life interest of the Countess in the castle. She survived far beyond Raleigh's expectations. Sir Richard Boyle, who purchased Raleigh's colonial possessions in Ireland, including the castle, was later said to have brought proceedings to evict the old lady, though the evidence is unreliable.

A legend claims that, to protect her interests in the castle, the impoverished "old Countess" set out from Cork in 1604. After sailing to Bristol, she walked the road to London with her invalid 90-year-old daughter, whom she pulled along in a cart. It was later argued that this story arose from a confusion with another dowager countess of Desmond, Elenor, who travelled to London to petition Elizabeth I. This countess was the widow of James FitzGerald, 14th Earl of Desmond who had died in 1558 and was the nephew of Katherine's husband.

== Death ==
Further legends surround her last years, none supported by evidence. Lady Desmond reportedly walked every week to her local market town, a distance of 4–5 miles, even after her return from London in 1604. It was said that all her teeth had been renewed just a few years earlier. It was said also that she died after falling from a tree at the age of about 100. Historians of the time disagreed as to the type of tree: Robert Sidney stated it was a nut tree, and that she fell, hurt her thigh, contracted fever and died. Another legend attributed her death to a fall while picking cherries. She is believed to be buried, with her husband, at the site of a former Franciscan Friary at Youghal, where many Geraldines were buried. The monastery was later destroyed and no monuments remain.

Clodagh Tait has questioned the generally accepted date of death of 1604, though rejecting the suggestion that Lady Katherine may have died as early as 1575.

There are two portraits of Lady Desmond whose provenance is provisionally confirmed and a third whose authenticity is less well-settled.

== Age ==
Raleigh, in his History of the World, maintained that Lady Desmond married in the time of King Edward IV (1461–1483), making her at least 135 years old at the time of her death. She was said to have danced with King Richard III, then Duke of Gloucester. In fact, she could not have been married earlier than 1505, as her husband's first wife, Síle (Anglicised as "Gilis" in the State papers), daughter of the lord of Muskerry, was still alive in that year. The tradition that she died at age 140 was recounted in Fynes Moryson's Itinerary and Sir Francis Bacon's History of Life. Harington, writing in 1605, referred to a man who lived longer than 140 years, and to a woman, "and she a countess," who lived longer than 120. If Katherine FitzGerald married in her early twenties, this latter description would match her. Historian Ian Mortimer asserted that her age was about 100, making her a rare although not unique centenarian of the Elizabethan age. Both Raleigh (1614) and Fynes Moryson (1613) refer to her as someone already deceased.

== Portraits ==
The text below Nathaniel Grogan's 1806 engraving of Lord Kerry's portrait reads as follows:

Catherine Fitz-Gerald (the long lived) Countess of Desmond
From an original family picture of the same size
Painted on Board in the Possession of The Right Honourable Maurice Fitz-Gerald, Knight of Kerry &c. &c. &c.
To whom this plate is most respectfully dedicated by his very obedient and much obliged humble servant Henry Pelham
This illustrious Lady was born about the year 1464, was married in the Reign of Edward IV, lived during the entire reigns of Edward V, Richard III, Henry VII, Henry VIII, Edward VI, Mary & Elizabeth, and died on the latter end of James I, or the beginning of Charles I Reigns at the great age (as is generally supposed) of 162 years.
Published as the act directs at Bear Island 4 June 1806 by Henry Pelham Esq.

On the back of the original painting, stated to have been executed during the Countess of Desmond's final visit to London, the following appears to have been painted:

Catherine, Countess of Desmond, as she appeared at ye court of our Sovereign Lord, King James, in this present year, A.D. 1614,
and in ye 140th yeare of her age. Thither she came from Bristol, to seek relief, ye house of Desmond having been ruined by attainder.
She was married in ye reigne of King Edward IV., and in ye course of her long pilgrimage, renewed her teeth liuice. Her principal residence is at Inchiquin, in Munster, whither she undauntedlie proposeth (her purpose accomplished) incontinentlie to return. Laus Deo.

== See also ==
- Longevity myths
