= Walter Butler of Nodstown =

Irish noble

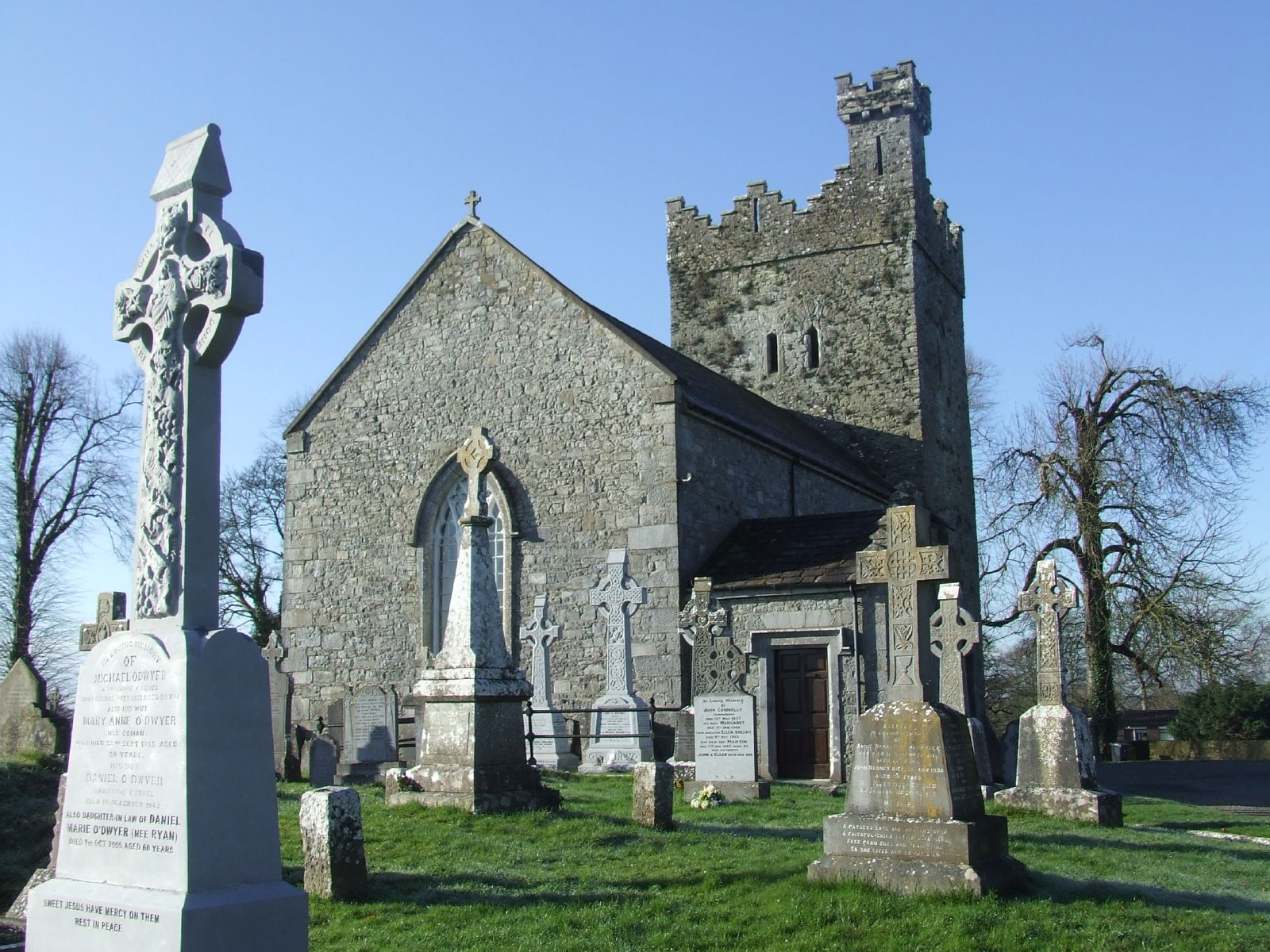
Ardmayle church, 2007

Walter Butler of Nodstown (or Ballynenoddagh or Moyaliffe), (died 1560) was the fourth son of James Butler, 9th Earl of Ormond and Lady Joan Fitzgerald. Nodstown is a townland in the civil parish of Ardmayle in the barony of Middle Third, County Tipperary. Moyaliff is a townland and a civil parish in the barony of Kilnamanagh Upper, County Tipperary.

== Marriage and issue ==
He was married to Anne, daughter of MacBrien O'Gonagh. Their children were:

- Pierce Butler, of Nodstown. He was only two years old at his father's death. He married Ellen, daughter of Thomas Purcell, Baron Loughmoe. He died on 21 February 1627 and was buried in nearby Holycross Abbey. They had a son and two daughters:

- James Butler, of Nodstown, his heir
- Richard Butler of Rorane.

- Joan Butler, who married John O'Dwyer of Dundrum, County Tipperary (who died in January 1627). Their children were:

- Philip their heir,
- Connor,
- Donogh,
- Margaret, and
- Winifred.

- Ellice or Elizabeth Butler, who first married John Sherlock of Mothe, County Waterford. They had a son Patrick and other children. Her first husband died on 25 May 1587. She secondly married Sir Edward Gough, by whom she had a son and a daughter. Thirdly she married Sir Laurence Esmonde, who was created Baron Esmonde of Lymbrick, County Wexford on 20 May 1622; they had no children.

== Moyaliffe Castle ==
While this was a Butler castle, it was in the possession of the O'Dwyer clan by 1654 as evidenced by the Civil Survey of that year. While the Butlers had been in occupation, it had been under constant attack by the O'Dwyers and their neighbours, the Ryans. A record from 1500 AD records that Sir Pierce Butler was in possession of the castle and lands of Moyaliffe when a serious territorial quarrel broke out with Turlough O'Brien of the O'Brien dynasty of Thomond, (with whom the O'Dwyers were traditionally allied). The fight reached its climax when Moyaliffe Castle was surrounded by the O'Briens. The Butlers immediately sent reinforcements from their main stronghold of Kilkenny under the leadership of Robert Shea, to relieve their besieged brethren. A desperate battle ensued which resulted in the complete defeat of the Butlers and the fall of Moyaliffe on 6 August 1500.

== See also ==
- Butler dynasty
