= Gerald FitzGerald, 14th Earl of Desmond =

Irish rebel earl (died 1583)

Gerald FitzGerald
- Earl of Desmond
- Tenure: 1558–1582
- Predecessor: James, 13th Earl of Desmond
- Successor: Forfeit 1582
- Born: c. 1533
- Died: 11 November 1583; Bóthar an Iarla, Glenageenty Wood
- Spouses: Joan Fitzgerald; Eleanor Butler
- Issue Detail: James FitzGerald & others
- Father: James fitz Gerald FitzGerald
- Mother: More O'Carroll

Gerald FitzGerald, 14th Earl of Desmond (c. 1533 – 1583), also counted as 15th or 16th, (Note: Cokayne numbers him as 14th earl, Burke numbers him as the 15th Earl, whereas Bagwell calls him the 16th earl.) owned large part of the Irish province of Munster. In 1565 he fought the private Battle of Affane against his neighbours, the Butlers. After this, he was for some time detained in the Tower of London. Though the First Desmond Rebellion took place in his absence, he led the Second Desmond Rebellion from 1579 to his death and was therefore called the Rebel Earl. He was attainted in 1582 and went into hiding but was hunted down and killed.

== Birth and origins ==
Gerald was born about 1533. He was the eldest son of James FitzJohn FitzGerald by his second wife, More O'Carroll. As his father's name was James, he was also, after the Norman patronymic manner, called "fitz James". His full name was, therefore: "Gerald FitzJames FitzGerald". His father was the 13th (or 14th or 15th) Earl of Desmond. His father had married as his first wife Joan Roche, his grandniece and had a son from her whose name was Thomas. His father had repudiated Joan for consanguinity and Thomas was considered illegitimate. The FitzGeralds of Desmond were a cadet branch of the Old English Geraldines, of which the FitzGeralds of Kildare were the senior branch.

Gerald's mother was an O'Carroll, a native Irish family or clan. He had two brothers and five sisters, who are listed in his father's article.

Family tree

Gerald FitzGerald with his two wives, his parents, and other selected relatives. (Note: This family tree is based on a graphic tree and on written genealogies of the earls of Desmond Also see the lists of children in the text.)

Thomas; 7th Earl d. 1468 of Drogheda
James; 8th Earl; 1459–1487	Maurice; 9th Earl d. 1520; The Lame	Thomas; 11th Earl; 1454–1534; The Bald	John de facto 12th Earl d. 1536
James; 10th Earl d. 1529	Maurice; FitzThomas d. 1529 d.v.p.*	James; 13th Earl d. 1558	More; O'Carroll d. 1548
James; Butler; 9th Earl; 1496–1546	Joan; FitzGerald d. 1565	James; 12th Earl d. 1540; Court Page	Gerald; 14th Earl c. 1533 – 1583; Rebel Earl	Eleanor; Butler
Thomas; 10th Earl c. 1531 – 1614; Back Tom	Elizabeth; Sheffield d. 1600	James; 1st Earl; 1570–1601; Tower Earl

Legend

XXX	Subject of the article	XXX	Earls of Desmond	XXX	Earls of Ormond

*d.v.p. = predeceased his father (decessit vita patris).

== Early life ==
In 1541 his father had agreed, as one of the terms of his Surrender and regrant submission to Henry VIII, to send young Gerald to be educated in England. At the accession of Edward VI these promises were renewed: Gerald was to be the companion of the young king, but these projects were never carried out.

Claims were made on the Desmond estate by the Butlers, the hereditary enemies of the Geraldines. The FitzGeralds and the Butlers were at perpetual war.

== First marriage ==
In 1550 Gerald FitzGerald married Joan Fitzgerald. She was about 40 whereas he was 17. The purpose was to make peace between the FitzGeralds of Desmond and the Butlers with help of the many links she had to both sides. She was Gerald FitzGerald's second cousin; their common great-grandfather was the 7th Earl of Desmond (see Family tree). She was the eldest daughter of the 10th Earl of Desmond and was his heiress-general as he died without male issue. She was the widow of the 9th Earl of Ormond and the mother of the reigning 10th Earl of Ormond. On Ormond's death she proposed to marry Gerald FitzGerald, and eventually did so after the death of her second husband, Sir Francis Bryan. The effect of this marriage was a temporary cessation of hostility between the Desmonds and her son, Thomas Butler, 10th Earl of Ormond. The marriage was childless.

== Earl of Desmond ==
On 14 October 1558, on his father's death, Gerald Fitzgerald succeeded as the 14th Earl of Desmond. On 30 November he was knighted by Lord Deputy Thomas Radclyffe, 3rd Earl of Sussex, at Waterford and offered homage. He soon established close relations with his namesake Gerald FitzGerald, 11th Earl of Kildare (1525–1585), and with Shane O'Neill. Despite a decree issued by Sussex in August 1560 regulating the matters in dispute between Ormond and the FitzGeralds, outlaws from both sides continued to plunder the other. In 1560 his wife's intervention secured a peaceful outcome to a stand-off at Bohermore, known as "the battle that never was".

For some time, Desmond resisted a summons to appear at Elizabeth I's court with the plea that he was at war with his uncle Maurice. When he did appear in London in May 1562, his (according to the English) insolent conduct before the privy council resulted in a short imprisonment in the Tower of London. Desmond was detained in England until 1564.

== Second marriage and children ==
Desmond's first wife died on 2 January 1565. Shortly thereafter he remarried to the 20-year-old Eleanor Butler, daughter of Edmond Butler, 1st Baron Dunboyne.

Gerald and Eleanor had two sons:

1. James (1570–1601), called the Tower Earl
2. Thomas

—and five daughters:

1. Margaret married Diarmid O'Conor
2. Joan (died 1598) married Diarmid O'Sullivan
3. Catherine, married first Maurice Roche, 6th Viscount Fermoy and secondly Daniel O'Brien, 1st Viscount Clare
4. Ellen, married firstly Sir Donough O'Conor of Sligo, secondly Sir Robert Cressy, and thirdly her cousin Edmond Butler, 3rd/13th Baron Dunboyne, and died at a great age in 1660.
5. Ellis (Elisabeth), married Sir Valentine Browne, 1st Baronet, ancestor of the Earls of Kenmare

== Affane ==
In 1565 he raided Thomond, and in Waterford, he sought to enforce his feudal rights on Sir Maurice Fitzgerald of Decies, who invoked the help of Thomas Butler (Gerald's former step-son by his 1st wife and 1st cousin to his new wife), the 10th Earl of Ormond. This slid into war with the Ormonds. On 8 February 1565, only a bit more than a month after his 1st wife's death, the two sides fought the private Battle of Affane on the Blackwater river. Here Ormond's brother, Sir Edmund Butler of Cloughgrenan, hit Desmond in the right hip with a pistol shot, cracking his thigh-bone and throwing him from his horse. About 300 Geraldines were killed, many of them drowning as they were intercepted by armed boats while crossing the river.

As the badly wounded captive Lord Desmond was being carried shoulder-high from the field, an Ormond commander rode up and jubilantly inquired, "Where is now the great Lord Desmond?" Desmond retorted,

Where but in his proper place, on the necks of the Butlers?

Ormond took the wounded Desmond in captivity to Clonmel and then to Waterford, where Lord Justice Nicholas Arnold took custody of him after a legal wrangle with Ormond.

Lords Ormond and Desmond were called to London where they promised to keep the peace, being allowed to return to Ireland early in 1566, where a royal commission was appointed to settle the matters in dispute between them. Desmond and his brother Sir John of Desmond were sent over to England, where they surrendered their lands to the queen after imprisonment in the Tower in 1568.

== First Desmond Rebellion ==
Meanwhile Desmond's cousin, James FitzMaurice FitzGerald, FitzMaurice for short, caused himself to be acclaimed captain of Desmond in defiance of Henry Sidney, and in the evident expectation of usurping the earldom. He sought to give the movement an ultra-Catholic character, with the idea of gaining foreign assistance, and allied himself with John Burke, son of the Earl of Clanricarde, with Connor O'Brien, 3rd Earl of Thomond, and even secured Ormond's brother, Sir Edmund Butler, whom Sidney had offended. Edward Butler also joined the rebellion, but the appearance of Sidney and Ormond in the southwest was rapidly followed by the submission of the Butlers. Most of the Geraldines were subjugated by Humphrey Gilbert, but FitzMaurice remained in arms, and in 1571 Sir John Perrot undertook to reduce him. Perrot hunted him down, and at last on 23 February 1573 he made formal submission at Kilmallock, lying prostrate on the floor of the church by way of proving his sincerity.

== Return to Ireland ==
In 1573 Desmond was discharged from the Tower and allowed to return to Ireland, despite the protestation of Elizabeth's counsellors. He promised not to exercise palatinate jurisdiction in Kerry until his rights to it were proven. He was detained for six months in Dublin, but in November slipped away. Edward FitzGerald, brother of the Earl of Kildare, and lieutenant of the queen's pensioners in London, was sent to remonstrate with Desmond, but accomplished nothing.

Desmond asserted that none but Brehon law should be observed between Geraldines. FitzMaurice seized Captain George Bourchier (father of Henry), one of Elizabeth's officers in the west. Essex met the Earl near Waterford in July, and Bourchier was surrendered, but Desmond refused the other demands made in the Queen's name. A document offering £500 for his head, and £1,000 to anyone who would take him alive, was drawn up, but was vetoed by two members of the council.

On 18 July 1574 the Geraldine chiefs signed a 'Combination' promising to support the Earl unconditionally; shortly afterwards Ormond and the lord deputy, William Fitzwilliam, marched on Munster, and put Desmond's garrison at Derrinlaur Castle to the sword. Desmond submitted at Cork on 2 September, handing over his estates to trustees: Sir Henry Sidney visited Munster in 1575, and affairs seemed to promise an early restoration of order.

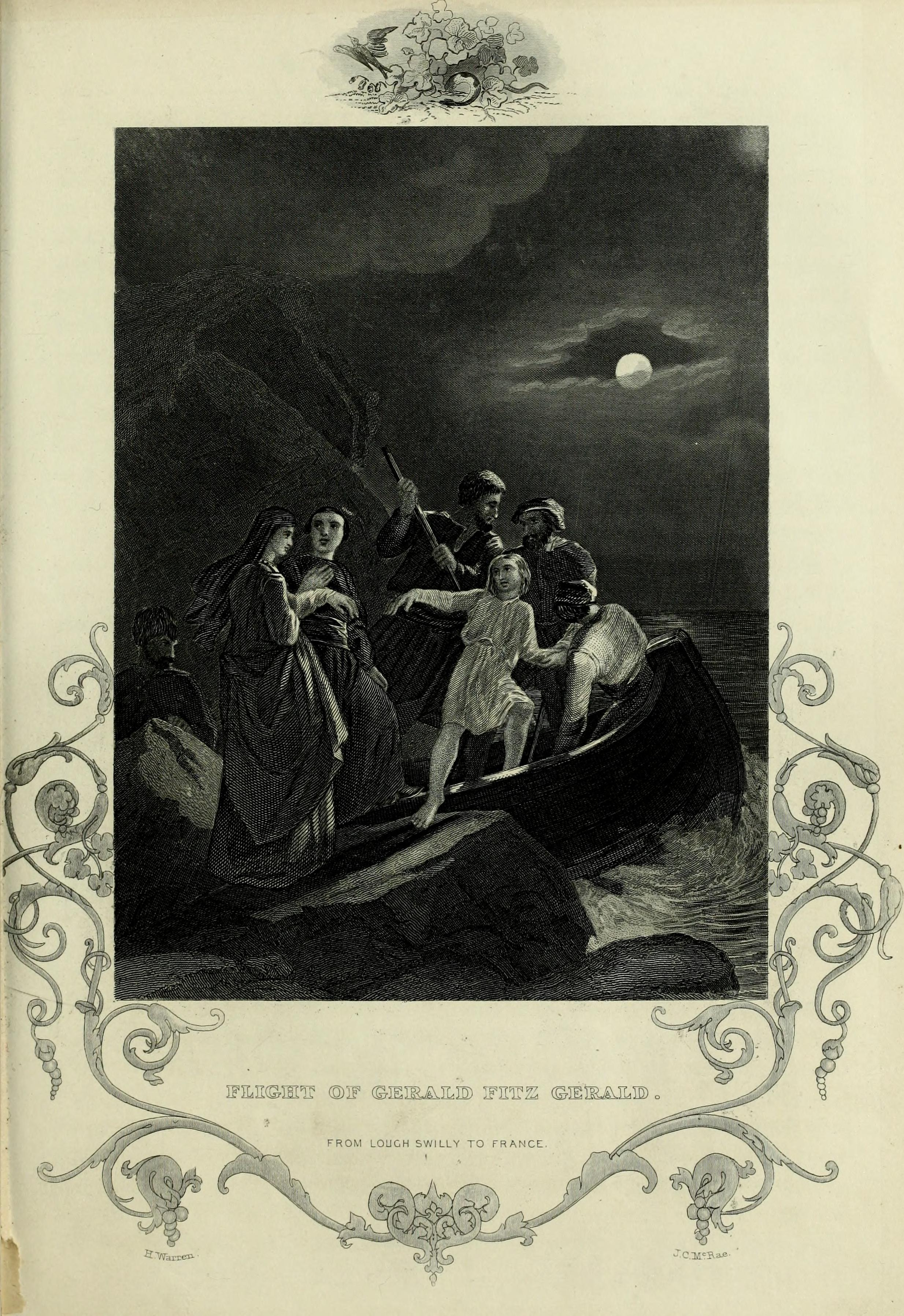
Gerald FitzGerald, 14th Earl of Desmond leaves via Lough Swilly for France, c. 1575. (J. C. McRae after H. Warren, 1884)

== Second Desmond Rebellion ==
But FitzMaurice had fled to Brittany, France, in the company of other leading Geraldines, John Fitzedmund Fitzgerald, seneschal of Imokilly, who had held Ballymartyr against Sidney in 1567, and Edmund Fitzgibbon, the son of the White Knight who had been attainted in 1571. He intrigued at the French and Spanish courts for a foreign invasion of Ireland, and at Rome met the adventurer Thomas Stucley, with whom he planned an expedition that should have made a nephew of Pope Gregory XIII king of Ireland. In 1579 FitzMaurice landed at Smerwick Bay, where he was joined later by some Spanish soldiers at the Dún an Óir. His ships were captured on 29 July 1579 and he himself was slain in a skirmish while on his way to Tipperary.

Nicholas Sanders, the papal legate who had accompanied FitzMaurice, sought to draw the Earl into rebellion. On 1 November 1579 Sir William Pelham proclaimed Desmond a traitor. The sack of Youghal and Kinsale by the Geraldines was speedily followed by attacks by Ormond and Pelham acting in concert with Admiral William Winter.

Carrigafoyle Castle and Askeaton Castle fell to the English in April 1580. Desmond's younger brother, Sir John of Desmond was killed in December 1581 near Castlelyons, and the Geraldine seneschal of Imokilly surrendered on 14 June 1583. This seneschal's lands excited envy; he was arrested in 1587, and died in Dublin Castle two days later.

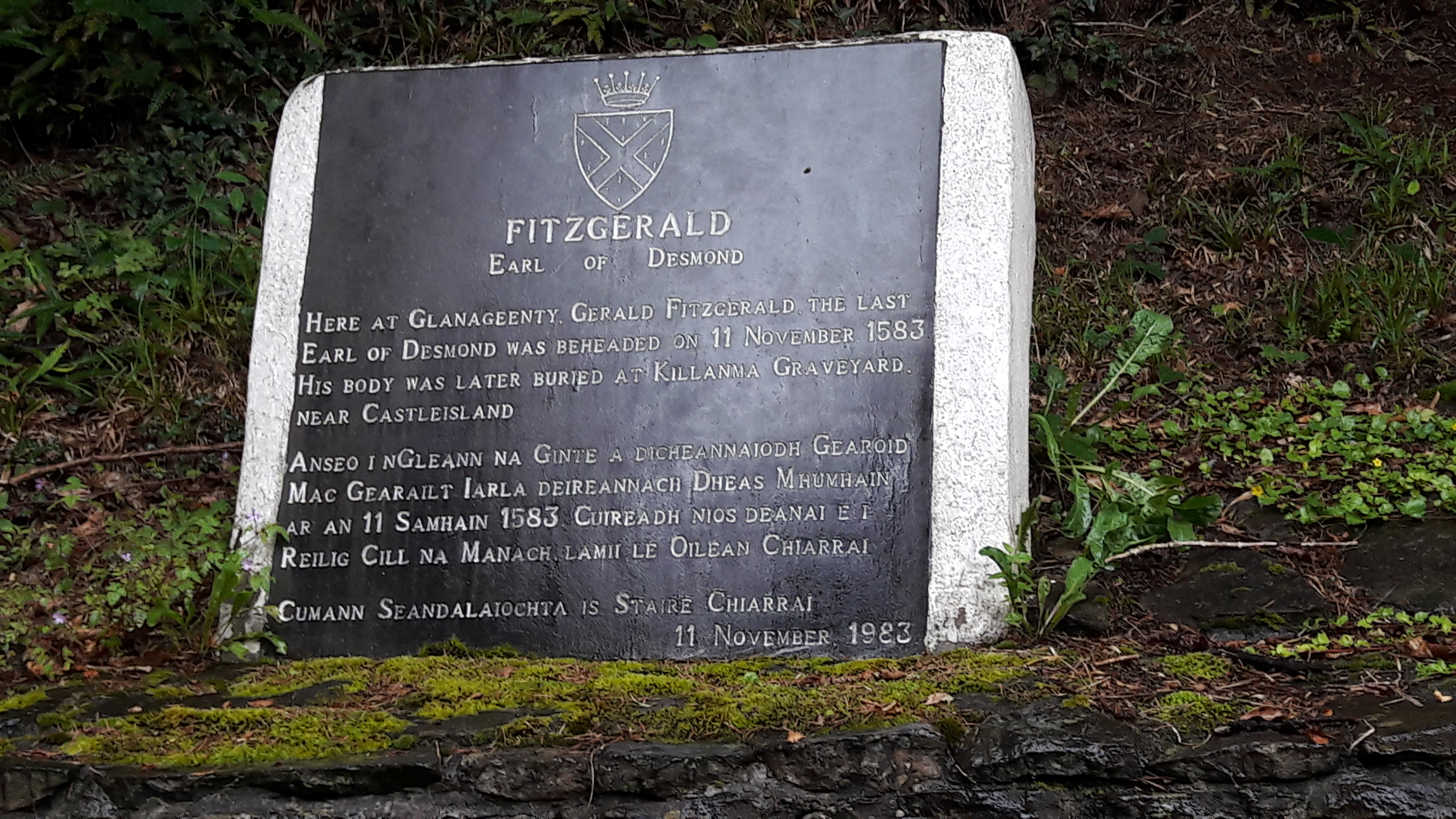
Memorial at the site of the 14th Earl's beheading.

== Death and timeline ==
In June 1581 Desmond took to the woods, but still had a considerable following for some time. By June 1583, when Ormond offered a price for his head, he was fleeing with only four followers. He was killed five months later, on 11 November 1583 in Glenageenty Wood near Tralee, County Kerry. His followers had attacked and plundered a farm but the farmer alerted the government forces who pursued the Earl and his men and surprised them at dawn in a cabin in the forest, five miles (8.0 km) east of Tralee at Bóthar an Iarla (Earl's Road). The Moriarty chieftain was given a substantial reward by Queen Elizabeth.

Timeline
As his birth date is uncertain, so are all his ages.
Age	Date	Event
0	1533, about	Born
13–14	1547, 28 Jan	Accession of Edward VI, succeeding Henry VIII
16–17	1550	Married his 1st wife
19–20	1553, 6 Jul	Accession of Mary I, succeeding Edward VI
24–25	1558, 17 Nov	Accession of Elizabeth I, succeeding Mary I
31–32	1565, 2 Jan	First wife died
31–32	1565, 8 Feb	Battle of Affane
35–36	1569	Outbreak of the first Desmond Rebellion
45–46	1579	Outbreak of the second Desmond Rebellion
49–50	1583, 11 Nov	Died near Tralee

== Ancestry ==
Ancestors of Gerald FitzGerald, 14th Earl of Desmond

James FitzGerald, 6th Earl of Desmond
Thomas FitzGerald, 7th Earl of Desmond
Mary de Burgh
John FitzGerald, de facto 12th Earl of Desmond
William Barry, 8th Baron Barry
Ellice de Barry
Ellen de la Roche
James FitzGerald, 13th Earl of Desmond
Donogh O'Brien of Carrigogunnell, Lord of Pobble
More O'Brien
Gerald FitzGerald, 14th Earl of Desmond
Sir Maolrony McShane O'Carroll, Lord of Ely
More O'Carroll

== Notes, citations, and sources ==
=== Sources ===
- Bagwell, Richard (1885). Ireland under the Tudors. Vol. II. London: Longmans, Green, and Co. OCLC 761857292. – 1558 to 1578
- Burke, Bernard (1866). A Genealogical History of the Dormant, Abeyant, Forfeited and Extinct Peerages of the British Empire (New ed.). London: Harrison. OCLC 11501348. (for Desmond)
- This article incorporates text from a publication now in the public domain: Chisholm, Hugh, ed. (1911). "Desmond, Gerald Fitzgerald, 15th Earl of". Encyclopædia Britannica. Vol. 8 (11th ed.). Cambridge University Press. pp. 98–99.
- Cokayne, George Edward (1895). Complete Peerage of England, Scotland, Ireland, Great Britain and the United Kingdom, Extant, Extinct, or Dormant. Vol. VI (1st ed.). London: George Bell and Sons. OCLC 1180818801. – N to R (for Ormond)
- Cokayne, George Edward (1916). Gibbs, Vicary (ed.). The complete peerage of England, Scotland, Ireland, Great Britain and the United Kingdom, extant, extinct, or dormant. Vol. IV (2nd ed.). London: St Catherine Press. OCLC 228661424. – Dacre to Dysart (for Desmond)
- Falls, Cyril (1997) [1st pub. 1900]. Elizabeth's Irish Wars. Syracuse, New York: Syracuse University Press. ISBN 0-8156-0435-1. – (Preview)
- Fryde, E. B.; Greenway, D. E.; Porter, S.; Roy, I., eds. (1986). Handbook of British Chronology. Royal Historical Society Guides and Handbooks, No. 2 (3rd ed.). London: Offices of the Royal Historical Society. ISBN 0-86193-106-8. – (for timeline)
- Joyce, Patrick Weston (1903). A Concise History of Ireland from the Earliest Times to 1837 (12th ed.). Dublin: M. H. Gill & Son. OCLC 815623752.
- McCormack, Anthony M. (October 2009). McGuire, James; Quinn, James (eds.). "FitzGerald, Gerald fitz James". Dictionary of Irish Biography.
- McGrath, Brid (1997). "Valentine Browne, (c.1615–1640) Kerry". A Biographical Dictionary of the Membership of the Irish House of Commons 1640 to 1641 (Ph.D.). Vol. 1. Dublin: Trinity College. pp. 83–84. hdl:2262/77206. – Parliaments & Biographies (PDF downloadable from given URL)
- McGurk, J. J. N. (2004). "FitzGerald, Gerald fitz James, fourteenth earl of Desmond (c. 1533–1583)". In Matthew, Colin; Harrison, Brian (eds.). Oxford Dictionary of National Biography. Vol. 19. New York: Oxford University Press. pp. 809–811. ISBN 0-19-861369-5. – (for the 14th Earl of Desmond)
- Moody, Theodore William; Martin, F. X.; Byrne, Francis John, eds. (1984). A New History of Ireland. Vol. IX:Maps, Genealogies, Lists. Oxford: Oxford University Press. ISBN 0-19-821745-5.
- Rowan, A. B. (1872). "The Last Geraldyn Chief of Tralee Castle". In Hickson, Mary Agnes (ed.). Selections from old Kerry Records. London: Watson & Hazell. pp. 117–130. OCLC 1084939992.
- Shaw, William A. (1906). The Knights of England. Vol. II. London: Sherratt & Hughes. – Knights bachelors & Index
- Westropp, Thomas Johnson (1903). "Notes on Askeaton, County Limerick: Part II. The History after 1579". The Journal of the Royal Society of Antiquaries of Ireland. 33 (2): 153–174. JSTOR 25507288.

Peerage of Ireland
Preceded by James FitzGerald	Earl of Desmond; 1st creation 1558–1582	Forfeit Disputed claim by James FitzThomas FitzGerald; Eventually James FitzGerald, 1st Earl of Desmond
