= Hugh Lacy (bishop) =

Hugh Lacy (also known as Hugh de Lacey or Lees) was an Anglican bishop in Ireland during the second half of the sixteenth century.

Formerly a Canon of Limerick he was appointed Bishop of Limerick on 24 November 1556. In a letter of 12 October 1561, the papal legate Fr David Wolfe SJ described all the bishops in Munster as 'adherents of the Queen'. In 1562 the Lord Lieutenant the Earl of Sussex, appointed to an ecclesiastical commission for enforcing the royal supremacy, was said to have 'by the laws of the realm, forfeited his bishopric'

Lacy was put forward by the crown to take over the administration of the Earldom of Desmond with Eleanor Butler, Countess of Desmond, as she was in 1568 the de facto leader there. However she took a different line and she released her prisoner James FitzMaurice FitzGerald to lead while her husband was imprisoned in the Tower in England.

Lacy was deprived of his bishopric on 8 May 1571; and died in 1580.

== Notes ==
Church of Ireland titles
Preceded by William Casey	Bishop of Limerick; 1556–1571	Succeeded by William Casey
