= James Butler of Duiske =

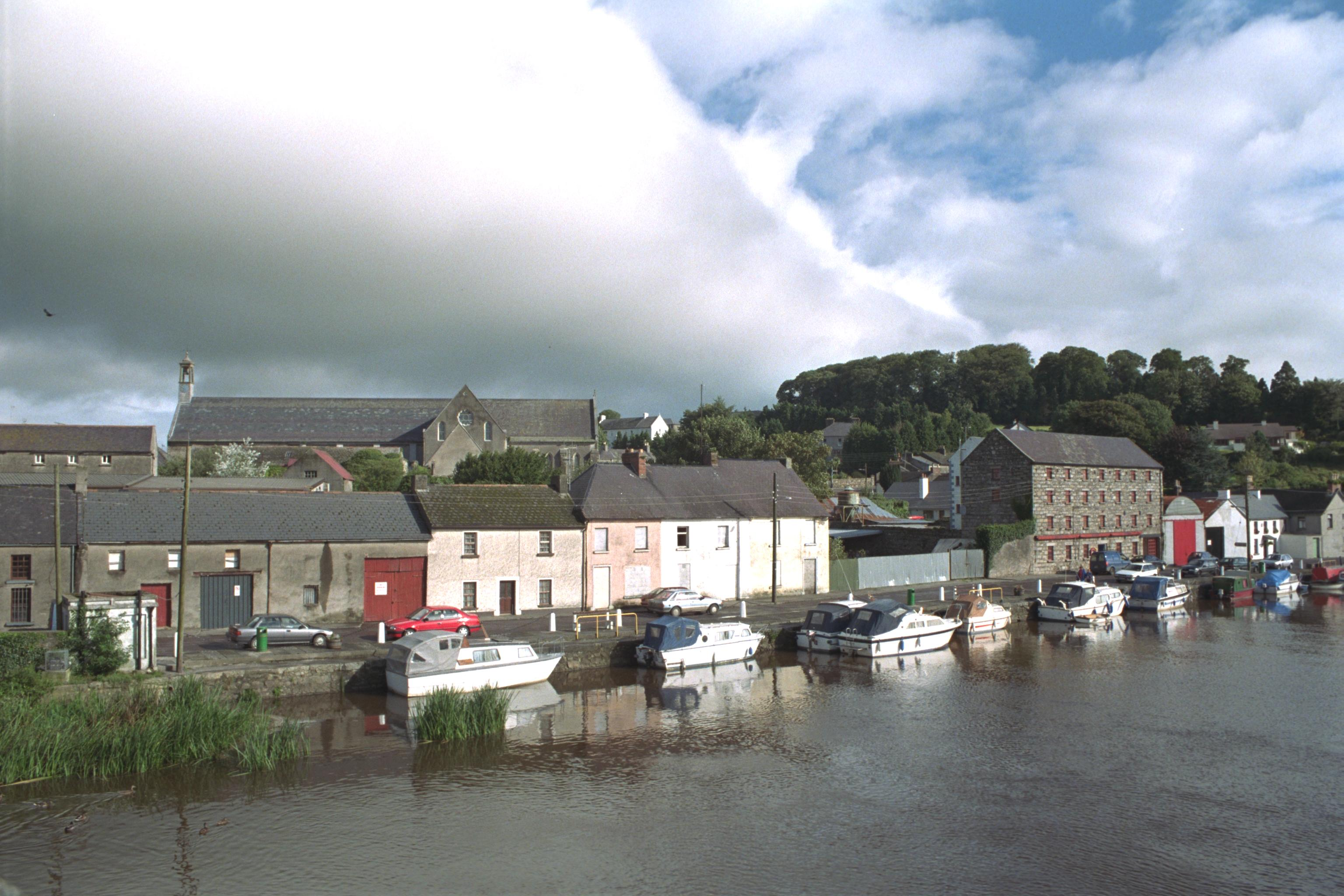
Duiske. View from the River Barrow.

James Butler of Duiske (Irish: Séamas de Buitléir an Dubhuisce) was a younger son of James Butler, 9th Earl of Ormond and Lady Joan Fitzgerald. In 1576, Queen Elizabeth I of England awarded him the lands of Duiske Abbey which had been confiscated by the Crown.

== Marriage and issue ==
Butler married Mary Edwards circa 1540 and had two sons:

- George Butler of Wexford 1562 - 1626
- Walter Butler

== See also ==
- Butler dynasty
