= James FitzGerald, Earl of Desmond =

Irish noblemen (1570 - 1601)

James FitzGerald
- Earl of Desmond
- Tenure: 1600–1601
- Predecessor: Gerald FitzGerald, 14th Earl of Desmond
- Successor: –
- Born: c.1570
- Died: November 1601
- Parents: Gerald FitzGerald, 14th Earl of Desmond; Eleanor Butler

James FitzGerald (c. 1570 – November 1601) was an Irish nobleman who was the successor of Gerald FitzGerald, 14th Earl of Desmond. He assumed the title of Earl of Desmond, which had been suppressed in 1582 after the Desmond Rebellions. He spent much of his life in captivity, and was temporarily, but unsuccessfully, restored to the earldom in 1600–01 by the English in an attempt to pacify Munster during the Nine Years' War. He thus became the Earl of Desmond, but soon returned to England, where he died in obscurity.

== Early life ==
James FitzGerald, the son of the 14th Earl and Eleanor Butler, was born during the earlier of the Desmond Rebellions; Queen Elizabeth of England was his godmother. He was resident in Ireland in 1579, when his father joined the latter rebellion against the crown, and at that time his mother chose to deliver him to Sir William Drury, lord deputy of Ireland, who placed him in custody in Dublin Castle. In August 1582, his mother complained bitterly to Lord Burghley that her son's education was being neglected and sought better care for him. After the death of his fugitive father, FitzGerald's gaolers made a petition to the English government for his removal to the Tower of London. The petition was granted in 1584, and before the end of the year, he was removed to the Tower, where he remained for the next 16 years.

== Captivity ==
FitzGerald was the heir to the earldom of Desmond, but in 1585 his late father's estate was attainted by the Irish parliament and all its property confiscated by the crown. Most of the hereditary lands in the province of Munster then underwent a radical plantation by English settlers (see Plantation of Munster), but such was the loyalty attached to the FitzGerald name there that the government had good cause to fear a future rebellion. These events occurred during the Anglo-Spanish War (1585–1604), and English fear was increased with the prospect of an intervention by the Spanish, who had a historical affinity with the west coast of Ireland.

It was in this context that the young heir found himself nurtured in London, where he was to lead a miserable existence. He appears to have been sickly, as shown by the accounts kept between 1588 and 1598 of payments for medicines, ointments, pills and syrups administered to him. In 1593, he wrote in pathetic terms to the queen's secretary, Sir Robert Cecil, but the government really only had one use for him.

== Irish campaign ==
In 1600, during the Nine Years War (Ireland) and following hostile intrusions into Munster at the direction of Hugh O'Neill, 3rd Earl of Tyrone, it was suggested by Sir George Carew that FitzGerald be paraded through the province as the true Earl of Desmond, to counter the popularity of the pretender to the earldom, James FitzThomas FitzGerald, (known as the Súgán – i.e. Hayrope – Earl). The queen hesitated at this suggestion, but was convinced by Cecil that the risk was worth taking.

A patent for the title of Earl of Desmond (the second creation) passed the great seal, without restoration of the confiscated lands and restricting any inheritance of the title; an allowance of £500 pa. was granted. FitzGerald was to remain in the custody of Captain Price and Miler Magrath, archbishop of Cashel; Price was charged with keeping him faithful to the queen and the Protestant religion, and was to maintain a frugal household. Carew was instructed by Cecil to keep FitzGerald under close observation, ready to arrest him if he showed sympathy with the rebels while allowing the appearance of liberty.

FitzGerald's party set out from Bristol in October 1600, bound for Cork, but the prisoner suffered such a severe bout of sea-sickness that he had to be landed at Youghal in south Munster. He was received enthusiastically by the Geraldine supporters – though the mayor of Cork was not courteous – and was quickly transferred to Mallow, and then to Kilmallock in the heart of Desmond country, where he was given lodgings by the English commander Sir George Thornton. On his arrival he praised the queen's clemency and was well-liked; the next day – a Sunday – he ostentatiously made his way to the Protestant church, while his followers awaited him in the Catholic chapel, a disappointment for which he was instantly derided by the people. In November 1600 the fortress of Castlemaine was surrendered to FitzGerald by a servant of the Súgán Earl, but owing to his failure to command the allegiance of the people the government soon discarded the Desmond heir.

== Death ==
FitzGerald resented the meanness of his allowance and was forbidden by Cecil to marry the widow Norreys, since a better match in England was hoped for. In March 1601, he was brought to London with a letter from Carew recommending him for a grant of land and a settled income. In August he complained of being penniless and despised, and appealed to Cecil for some of the lands that had been held by the Súgán Earl. He died in London in early November 1601, but it was only in January 1602 that the death was announced. His guardians were then released from their charge, one of whom, William Power, wrote for pecuniary assistance for FitzGerald's four sisters.

== Ancestry ==
Ancestors of James FitzGerald, Earl of Desmond

Thomas FitzGerald, 7th Earl of Desmond
John FitzGerald, de facto 12th Earl of Desmond
Ellice de Barry
James FitzGerald, 14th Earl of Desmond
Donogh O'Brien of Carrigogunnell, Lord of Pobble
Móre O'Brien
Gerald FitzGerald, 14th Earl of Desmond
Sir Maolrony McShane O'Carroll, Lord of Ely
Móre O'Carroll
James FitzGerald, Earl of Desmond
Theobald Butler, 3rd Chief Butler of Ireland
Theobald Butler, 4th Chief Butler of Ireland
Margery de Burgh, daughter of Richard Mor de Burgh, 1st Lord of Connacht
Thomas Butler, 1st Baron Dunboyne
John Fitzgeoffrey, Lord of Kirtling, Sheriff of Yorkshire
Joan FitzJohn
Isabel Bigod
Eleanor Butler
William le Petit
Synolda le Petit

== Sources ==
- Richard Bagwell, Ireland under the Tudors 3 vols. (London, 1885–1890)
- John O'Donovan (ed.) Annals of Ireland by the Four Masters (1851)
- Calendar of State Papers: Carew MSS. 6 vols. (London, 1867–1873)
- Calendar of State Papers: Ireland (London)
- Colm Lennon Sixteenth Century Ireland – The Incomplete Conquest (Dublin, 1995) ISBN 0-312-12462-7.
- Nicholas P. Canny Making Ireland British, 1580–1650 (Oxford University Press, 2001) ISBN 0-19-820091-9.
- Steven G. Ellis Tudor Ireland (London, 1985) ISBN 0-582-49341-2.
- Hiram Morgan Tyrone's War (1995)
- Anne Chambers As Wicked a Woman (Dublin, 1986) ISBN 0-86327-190-1.
- Standish O'Grady (ed.) "Pacata Hibernia" 2 vols. (London, 1896)
- Cyril Falls Elizabeth's Irish Wars (1950; reprint London, 1996) ISBN 0-09-477220-7.
- Gerard Anthony Hayes McCoy Irish Battles (Belfast, 1989) ISBN 0-86281-212-7.
- Dictionary of National Biography 22 vols. (London, 1921–1922).

Peerage of Ireland
New creation Ultimately Gerald FitzGerald, 14th Earl of Desmond	Earl of Desmond; 2nd creation 1600–1601	Forfeit Eventually Richard Preston, 1st Earl of Desmond
