= James FitzThomas FitzGerald =

Pretended earl of Desmond (died 1608)

James fitz Thomas FitzGerald, called the Súgán Earl (died 1608), was a pretender to the Earldom of Desmond who made his claim and led a rebellion after the last earl, Gerald FitzGerald, 14th Earl of Desmond had been killed in 1583. The pretended earl derived his claim from being the eldest grandson of James FitzGerald, 13th Earl of Desmond. However, the marriage of his paternal grandparents had been annulled for consanguinity as his paternal grandmother was the 13th Earl's grandniece.

== Birth and origins ==
James was the eldest son of Thomas FitzGerald and his wife Ellice Power. His father's full name, including the patronymic and his Gaelic sobriquet "ruadh" (the red) was: Thomas Ruadh fitz James FitzGerald. His father was the eldest son of James FitzGerald, 13th Earl of Desmond and his wife Joan Roche, daughter of Maurice Roche, Lord Fermoy.

His mother ...His father's and his mother's family were part of the Desmond FitzGeralds.

James should have been heir apparent to the earldom. However, his paternal grandmother, Joan Roche was his grandfather's grandniece which as a fourth-degree relationship was within the forbidden range of consanguinity. The marriage of his paternal grandparents was therefore annulled, and their son, Sir Tomás Ruadh FitzGerald of Conna, father of James (Séamus) Fitzgerald, "the Sugán Earl," was declared illegitimate and therefore disinherited.

His mother was a daughter of Richard Power, 1st Baron le Power and Coroghmore, by Catherine Butler, daughter of Piers Butler, 8th Earl of Ormond. His mother's family was Old English.

Tomás Ruadh and Ellice Power had at least two other children, John FitzThomas, and a daughter, who married Donal of the Pipes, 17th Prince of Carbery. Inclined to dispute the claim of his father's younger, legitimate brother Gerald FitzGerald, 14th Earl of Desmond, the current of politics proved too strong against James FitzThomas. Toward the end of his short life, the putative earl of Desmond eventually sank into obscurity.

Family tree

James fitz Thomas FitzGerald with wife, parents, and other selected relatives. (Note: This family tree is based on a graphic tree and on written genealogies of the earls of Desmond.)

John de facto 12th Earl d. 1536	More; O'Brien
James; 13th Earl d. 1558	More; O'Carroll d. 1548	Maurice fitz John; Totane
Gerald; 14th Earl c. 1533 – 1583; Rebel Earl	Eleanor; Butler	Maurice; 6th Viscount; Fermoy d. 1600	Eleanor; FitzGerald
James; 1st Earl; 1570–1601; Tower Earl	Joan; Roche
Thomas fitz James; FitzGerald; Ruadh	Ellis; Power
James fitz Thomas; FitzGerald d. 1608 'Sugan Earl'	Ellen; Fitzgibbon

Legend

XXX	Subject of the article	XXX	Earls of Desmond	XXX	Viscounts; Fermoy

== Marriage and children ==
James Fitzthomas FitzGerald married Ellen, widow of Maurice FitzGibbon, elder brother of Edmund FitzGibbon FitzGerald, the White Knight, but had no issue.

=== Claims to the earldom ===
When of an age to understand his position as heir to a contested title, James Fitzthomas repaired to court to petition Elizabeth for a restoration of his rights. At first, his petition was regarded with favour. The crown offered slight encouragement and promised him a yearly allowance. Consequently, during the rebellion of his uncle Gerald, both he and his father remained staunch allies of the English crown. After the death of the 14th Earl and the suppression of the rebellion in 1583, James FitzThomas and his father looked for their restoration to the earldom. Their petitions, however, no longer found favour at Elizabeth's court, for Munster was to be denuded of its native population, "planted" with Englishmen, and re-established as a settlement colony of England.

=== Attempts to secure the earldom ===
In 1598, instigated by his brother John FitzThomas, and by Hugh O'Neill, Earl of Tyrone, Munster, in the words of the Irish annalists, again became "a trembling sod." James FitzThomas assumed the title of Earl of Desmond, and before long found himself at the head of eight thousand clansmen. On 12 October 1598, realizing that he would obtain little if any justice, "to maintain his right, trusting in the Almighty to further the same," James FitzThomas stated both his grievances and intentions in response to the expostulations of the Earl of Ormond.

The younger FitzGerald's struggle lasted three years. In 1598, he took Desmond Hall and Castle in Newcastle West, but lost it the following year. In October 1600, while withdrawing his forces from the open into the woods of Aharlow, he was surprised by Captain Richard Graeme and the garrison of Kilmallock. From that day the Geraldines never rallied again to any purpose. Dismissing his followers, the earl took to the woods for safety, where, in May 1601, Sir George Carew was informed that he was living "in the habit of a priest," but determined "to die rather than to depart the province, retaining still his traitorly hopes to be relieved out of Ulster or out of Spain." Carew made several attempts to procure his capture or death, but without success, for "such is the superstitious folly of these people, as for no price he may be had, holding the same to be so heinous as no priest will give them absolution." Eventually, on 29 May 1601, he was captured by Edmund FitzGibbon FitzGerald, the White Knight, while hiding in "an obscure cave many fathoms underground" in the neighbourhood of Mitchelstown. FitzGerald was placed in irons to prevent a rescue, "so exceedingly beloved of all sorts" was he, and conveyed to Shandon Castle, where he was immediately arraigned and adjudged guilty of treason.

For a time Carew hoped to make use of James FitzThomas against a still greater rebel, Hugh O'Neill. However, on 13 August, finding FitzGerald to be after all but a "dull-spirited traitor," Carew handed him over to Sir Anthony Cooke, who conveyed FitzGerald to England, where, on his arrival, he was placed in the Tower of London.

== Later life and death ==
Of his life in prison there remains only the following notice: "The demands of Sir John Peyton, Lieutenant of Her Majesty's Tower of London, for one quarter of a year, from St. Michael's day 1602 till the feast of our Lord God next. For James M'Thomas. Sayd tyme at 3l. per week, physicke, sourgeon, and watcher with him in his Lunacy." Historians conjecture that FitzGerald died sometime in 1608, and was buried in the chapel of the Tower.

After FitzGerald's capture, his brother John FitzThomas FitzGerald, who had shared with him in the vicissitudes of the rebellion, and who indeed seems to have been the prime instigator of it, escaped with his wife, the daughter of Richard Comerford of Dangenmore, Kilkenny, into Spain, where he was styled the Conde de Desmond, and where he died a few years afterwards in Barcelona. His son Gerald, also known as the Conde de Desmond, entered the service of the Emperor Ferdinand, and was killed in 1632. As he left no issue, with him ended the male heirs of the four eldest sons of Thomas FitzGerald, 7th Earl of Desmond.

== Ancestry ==
Ancestors of James FitzThomas FitzGerald

Thomas FitzGerald, 7th Earl of Desmond
John FitzGerald, de facto 12th Earl of Desmond
Ellice de Barry
James FitzGerald, 13th Earl of Desmond
Donogh O'Brien of Carrigogunnell, Lord of Pobble
Móre O'Brien
Sir Thomas FitzGerald, called Ruadh
Maurice Roche, 6th Viscount Fermoy
Joan Roche
Maurice FitzGerald, called Totane
Eleanor FitzGerald
James fitz Thomas FitzGerald
Richard Power, 1st Baron le Power and Coroghmore
Ellice Power (or "le Poer")
Piers Butler, 8th Earl of Ormond
Catherine Butler
Margaret FitzGerald
