= James FitzGerald, 13th Earl of Desmond =

Irish earl (died 1558)

James fitz John FitzGerald
- Earl of Desmond
- Tenure: 1540–1558
- Predecessor: James, de jure 12th Earl
- Successor: Gerald, 14th Earl
- Died: 14 October 1558; Askeaton
- Buried: Askeaton Friary
- Spouses: 1. Joan Roche; 2. Móre O'Carroll; 3. Catherine Butler; 4. Evelyn MacCarthy Mor
- Issue Detail: Thomas, Gerald & others
- Father: John fitz Thomas FitzGerald
- Mother: Móre O'Brien

James fitz John FitzGerald, 13th Earl of Desmond (died 1558), also counted as the 14th, ruled 22 years, the first 4 years as de facto earl until the death of James FitzGerald, de jure 12th Earl of Desmond, called Court Page, who was murdered by James fitz John's brother Maurice fitz John FitzGerald, called Totane. James fitz John FitzGerald maintained himself in power by skilful diplomacy, avoiding armed conflict and destruction. He was appointed Lord Treasurer of Ireland in 1547.

== Birth and origins ==
James was born about 1500, the second but eldest surviving son of John fitz Thomas FitzGerald and his wife More O'Brien. At that time his father was a younger brother of the reigning earl of Desmond, Thomas fitz Thomas, the 11th Earl, called the Bald. His father's family, the FitzGeralds of Desmond, were a noble cadet branch of the Old English Geraldines, of which the FitzGeralds of Kildare were the senior branch.

James's mother was a daughter of Donogh O'Brien of Carrigogunnell, County Limerick, Lord of Pobblebrien. His mother's family was a cadet branch of the O'Briens, kings of Thomond, a native Irish family.

== Father's claim ==
In 1534 at the death of James's grandfather, James's father seized the earldom, claiming that James fitz Maurice FitzGerald, de jure 12th Earl of Desmond ("Court Page"), was illegitimate because of his parents' consanguinity. Indeed, Court Page's father, Maurice fitz Thomas had married his first cousin Joan, daughter of John fitz Mauric Fitzgibbon, the white knight. James's father was therefore known as the de facto 12th Earl of Desmond. James fitz John was his heir apparent.

Family tree

James FitzJohn with his two wives, his parents, and other selected relatives. (Note: This family tree is based on a graphic tree an on written genealogies of the earls of Desmond. Also see the lists of siblings and children in the text. Note his problematic first marriage.)

Thomas; 7th Earl d. 1468 of Drogheda
Thomas; 11th Earl; 1454–1534; The Bald	John de facto 12th Earl d. 1536	More; O'Brien
Maurice fitz Thomas d. 1529 d.v.p.*	James; 13th Earl d. 1558	More; O'Carroll d. 1548	Maurice; FitzJohn of Totane
James; 12th Earl d. 1540; Court Page	Gerald; 14th Earl c. 1533 – 1583; Rebel Earl	Eleanor; Butler	Maurice; 6th Viscount; Fermoy d. 1600	Eleanor; FitzGerald
James; 1st Earl; 1570–1601; Tower Earl	Joan; Roche
Thomas; FitzJames; FitzGerald; Ruadh	Ellis le Poer
James; FitzThomas; FitzGerald d. 1608 'Sugan Earl'

Legend

XXX	Subject of the article	XXX	Earls of Desmond	XXX	Viscounts; Fermoy

*d.v.p. = predeceased his father (decessit vita patris).

== Rule as de facto earl ==
On the death of his father in June 1536, James FitzGerald assumed the Desmond title and took possession of the Desmond lands that had been his father's as de facto earl. Both were disputed. James fitz Maurice FitzGerald, called Court Page, was earl de jure, but stayed, at least for the moment, away in London. The lands were disputed by James Butler, 9th Earl of Ormond (c. 1496 – 1546), who had married the only daughter of the James FitzGerald, 10th Earl of Desmond. In order to support his position, the pretended earl Desmond, as he now was, sought the support of Connor O'Brien, King of Thomond, the head of the discontented party in Ireland. The government, which had just suppressed the rebellion of Thomas FitzGerald, 10th Earl of Kildare, resolved to attack him, and on 25 July 1536, Lord Leonard Grey, Lord Deputy of Ireland, marched against him. Breaching the border west of Cashel, Grey sought to separate FitzGerald from O'Brien. Grey took possession of the castle of Lough Gur, County Limerick, which Desmond abandoned without fight. Grey gave the captured castle to Ormond.

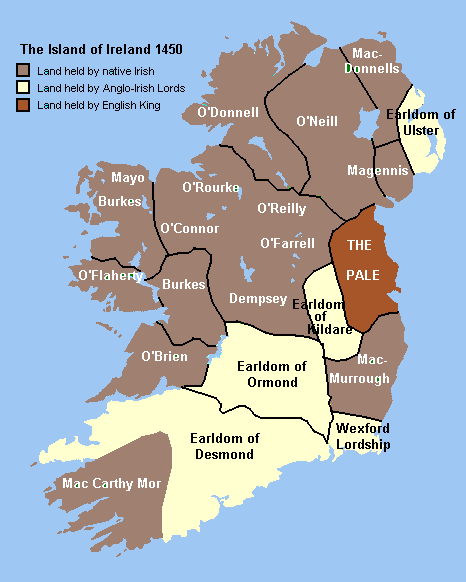
Ireland, showing the Earldom of Desmond in the southwest

Desmond offered to deliver up his two sons as hostages and to submit his claims to the earldom to the decision of Lord Grey. This offer was renewed in December of the same year. "And as far as ever I could perceive," wrote Grey to Thomas Cromwell in February 1537, "the stay that keepeth him from inclining to the king's grace's pleasure is the fear and doubt which he and all the Geraldines (Note: "Geraldines" was the name for members of the FitzGerald dynasty.) in Munster have in the Lord James Butler, both for the old malice that hath been betwixt their bloods, and principally for that he claimeth title by his wife to the earldom of Desmond."

Grey argued in favour of James fitz John's claims. In August 1538, Anthony St Leger, who was at the time serving on the commission "for the order and establishment to be taken and made touching the whole state of Ireland," was advised by Cromwell "to handle the said James in a gentle sort." Accordingly, on 15 September, FitzGerald was invited to submit his claims to the commissioners at Dublin. Suspecting their intention, he declined to place himself in their power, though signing articles of submission and promising to deliver up his eldest son as a hostage for his good faith. The negotiations continued to be delayed. In March 1538, the commissioners wrote that FitzGerald "hathe not only delivered his son, according to his first promise, to the hands of Mr. William Wyse of Waterford to be delivered unto us, but also hath affirmed by his secretary and writing all that he afore promised."

Desmond had good reason for his caution. The Ormond faction in the council, violently opposed to Grey and St Leger, were assiduously striving to effect his ruin. In July 1539, John Allen related to Cromwell how the "pretended Earl of Desmond" had confederated with O'Donnell and O'Neill "to make insurrection against the king's majesty and his subjects, not only for the utter exile and destruction of them, but also for the bringing in, setting up, and restoring young Gerald (the sole surviving scion of the house of Kildare) to all the possessions and pre-eminences which his father had; and so finally among them to exclude the king from all his regalities within this land."

=== Court Page's murder ===
In 1540 Court Page came to Ireland and established himself in Barony Kerrycurrihy in southern County Cork, which together with the barony of Imokilly, had been taken from Desmond in 1539 by Grey, helped by Ormond.

On 19 March 1540 Court Page was killed by his cousin, Maurice fitz John FitzGerald, called Totane, Desmond's brother. Court Page is reported to have died at a place called Leacan Sgail in County Kerry that does not seem to have been identified.

In April 1540 the council informed King Henry VIII that "your grace's servant James Fitzmaurice, who claimed to be Earl of Desmond, was cruelly slain the Friday before Palm Sunday, of unfortunate chance, by Maurice FitzJohn FitzGerald, brother to James FitzJohn FitzGerald, then usurper of the earldom of Desmond. After which murder done, the said James Fitzjohn immediately resorted to your town of Youghal, where he was well received and entertained, and ere he departed entered into all such piles and garrisons in the county of Cork as your majesty's deputy, with the assistance of your army and me, the Earl of Ormonde, obtained before Christmas last."

Ormonde was sent to parley with FitzGerald, but he refused to trust him. On the arrival of St Leger as deputy, however, FitzGerald again renewed his offer of submission, and promised, upon pledges being given for his safety, to meet him at Cashel. This he did, and renounced the supremacy of the Pope. "And then," wrote St Leger, "considering the great variance between the Earl of Ormond and him, concerning the title of the earldom of Desmond ... I and my fellows thought it not good to leave that cancer remain, but so laboured the matter on both sides, that we have brought them to a final end of the said title."

St Leger assured King Henry "that sith my repair into this your land I have not heard better counsel of no man for the reformation of the same than of the said Earl of Desmond, who undoubted is a very wise and discreet gentleman", for which reason, he said, he had sworn him of the council and given him "gown, jacket, doublet, hose, shirts, caps, and a riding coat of velvet, which he took very thankfully, and ware the same in Limerick and in all places where he went with me". By such conciliatory conduct St Leger, in the opinion of Justice Cusack, won over to obedience the whole province of Munster.

In July 1541, Desmond was appointed chief executor of the "ordinances for the reformation of Ireland" in Munster. In token of the renunciation of the privilege claimed by his ancestors of not being obliged to attend the great councils of the realm, he took his seat in a parliament held at Dublin. In June 1542 he visited England, where he was graciously received by King Henry, his title acknowledged, and the king wrote to the Irish council "that the Earl of Desmond hath here submitted himself in so honest, lowly, and humble a sort towards us, as we have conceived a very great hope that he will prove a man of great honour, truth, and good service". Nor did he, during the rest of his life, fail to justify this opinion. On 9 July 1543, he obtained a grant of the crown lease of St. Mary's Abbey, Dublin, to give him a place where he could stay when attending parliament.

Henry's son, Edward VI, named him Lord Treasurer of Ireland on the death of the Earl of Ormonde (patent 29 March 1547), and on 15 October 1547, when thanking him for his services in repressing disorders in Munster, King Henry offered to make a companion of his son. During the government of Edward Bellingham, he was accused of treason, and having refused a peremptory order to appear in Dublin, the deputy swooped down upon him unexpectedly in the dead of winter 1548, and carried him off a prisoner. He was soon released and continued in office by Queen Mary.

== Marriages and children ==
FitzGerald married four times:

=== First marriage ===
FitzGerald's first marriage was to his great-niece Joan Roche, daughter of Maurice Roche, 6th Viscount Fermoy, and his wife Eleanor, the daughter of FitzGerald's younger brother Maurice. The marriage was annulled and their son Thomas Ruadh FitzGerald of Conna, who otherwise would have been heir apparent, was disinherited. FitzGerald's grandson by Thomas, James (Séamus) Fitzgerald, called "the Sugán Earl", would claim the earldom and lead a revolt.

=== Second marriage and children ===
Secondly he married More O'Carroll, daughter of Sir Maolrony McShane O'Carroll, Lord of Ely.

James and More had three sons:

1. Gerald (c. 1533 – 1583) succeeded as the 14th Earl
2. John (died 1581), was killed near Castlelyon during the Second Desmond Rebellion
3. Maurice, predeceased his father and died childless

—and five daughters:

1. Honora, married Donald McCarthy, 1st Earl of Clancare
2. Margaret, married Thomas Fitzmaurice, 16th Baron Kerry
3. Eleanor (Ellis), married John, "More", Lord Poer of Curraghmore
4. Joan, married first John, Lord Barry, secondly Sir Donal O'Brien, and thirdly Sir Piers Butler of Cahir.
5. Ellis, married James, Viscount Buttevant.

More died in 1548.

=== Third and fourth marriages ===
Thirdly Desmond married Catherine Butler, second daughter of Piers Butler, 8th Earl of Ormond, and widow of Richard Power, 4th Baron Power, of Curraghmore. She died at Askeaton on 17 March 1553.

Fourthly and last Desmond married Evelyn MacCarthy Mor, daughter of Donal MacCormac MacCarthy Mor, by whom he had a son, Sir James-Sussex FitzGerald who died in 1580, and a daughter, Elinor who married Sir Brian O'Rourke.

== Death and timeline ==
In the summer of 1558 Desmond became sick and died at Askeaton on Thursday, 14 October. He was buried in the nearby Franciscan Friary on 1 November. Half a century after Desmond's death, the chroniclers of the Annals of Four Masters observed:

"The loss of this good man was woful to his country; for there was no need to watch cattle or close doors from Dun-caoin, in Kerry, to the green-bordered meeting of the three waters, on the confines of the province of Eochaidh, the son of Lachta and Leinster."

Timeline
As his birth date is uncertain, so are all his ages.
Age	Date	Event
0	1500, estimate	Born
32–33	1533, about	Son Gerald born
33–34	1534	His father seized the earldom at his grandfather's, death.
35–36	1536, December	Succeeded his father, de facto 12th Earl, as de facto 13th Earl of Desmond
39–40	1540, 19 Mar	Succeeded his cousin as (de jure) 13th Earl of Desmond
46–47	1547, 28 Jan	Accession of Edward VI, succeeding Henry VIII
47–48	1548	More his 2nd wife died.
52–53	1553, 6 Jul	Accession of Mary I, succeeding Edward VI
57–58	1558, 27 Oct	Died

== Ancestry ==
Ancestors of James FitzGerald, 13th Earl of Desmond

Gerald FitzGerald, 3rd Earl of Desmond
James FitzGerald, 6th Earl of Desmond
Eleanor Butler
Thomas FitzGerald, 7th Earl of Desmond
Mary de Burgh
John FitzGerald, de facto 12th Earl of Desmond
William Barry, 8th Baron Barry
Ellice de Barry
Ellen de la Roche
James FitzGerald, 13th Earl of Desmond
Donogh O'Brien of Carrigogunnell, Lord of Pobble
Móre O'Brien

== Notes and references ==
=== Sources ===
- Brewer, John Sherren; Bullen, William, eds. (1867). Calendar of the Carew Manuscripts Preserved in the Archiepiscopal Library at Lambeth 1515–1574. Calendar of state papers. London: Longmans, Green, Reader, & Dyer. OCLC 906123913.
- Burke, Bernard (1866). A Genealogical History of the Dormant, Abeyant, Forfeited and Extinct Peerages of the British Empire (New ed.). London: Harrison. OCLC 11501348.
- Clavin, Terry (October 2009). McGuire, James; Quinn, James (eds.). "FitzGerald, James fitz John". Dictionary of Irish Biography.
- Cokayne, George Edward (1895). Complete Peerage of England, Scotland, Ireland, Great Britain and the United Kingdom, Extant, Extinct, or Dormant. Vol. VI (1st ed.). London: George Bell and Sons. OCLC 1180818801. – N to R (for Power)
- Cokayne, George Edward (1916). Gibbs, Vicary (ed.). The complete peerage of England, Scotland, Ireland, Great Britain and the United Kingdom, extant, extinct, or dormant. Vol. IV (2nd ed.). London: St Catherine Press. OCLC 228661424. – Dacre to Dysart (for Desmond)
- Dunlop, Robert (1889). "FitzGerald, Gerald, fifteenth earl of Desmond (d. 1583)". In Lee, Sidney (ed.). Dictionary of National Biography. Vol. XIX. New York: MacMillan and Co. pp. 120–122. OCLC 8544105.
- Fryde, E. B.; Greenway, D. E.; Porter, S.; Roy, I., eds. (1986). Handbook of British Chronology. Royal Historical Society Guides and Handbooks, No. 2 (3rd ed.). London: Offices of the Royal Historical Society. ISBN 0-86193-106-8. – (for timeline)
- Graves, James (1869). "The Earls of Desmond". The Journal of the Historical and Archaeological Association of Ireland. 3rd. 1 (2): 459–498. JSTOR 25497799.
- Lodge, John (1789). Archdall, Mervyn (ed.). The Peerage of Ireland or, A Genealogical History of the Present Nobility of that Kingdom. Vol. IV. Dublin: James Moore. OCLC 264906028. – Viscounts
- McCormack, Anthony M. (October 2009). McGuire, James; Quinn, James (eds.). "FitzGerald (fitz Maurice), James". Dictionary of Irish Biography.
- Moody, Theodore William; Martin, F. X.; Byrne, Francis John, eds. (1984). A New History of Ireland. Vol. IX:Maps, Genealogies, Lists. Oxford: Oxford University Press. ISBN 0-19-821745-5.
- O'Donovan, John, ed. (1856). Annals of the Kingdom of Ireland, by the four Masters, from the Earliest Period to 1606. Vol. V (2nd ed.). Dublin: Hodges, Smith & Co. OCLC 1039532722. – 1501 to 1588
- State Paper Commission (1834). State Papers Published under the Authority of His Majesty's Commission. Vol. II. London: His/Her Majesty's Stationery Office. OCLC 1085335500. – Correspondence between the governments of England and Ireland 1515 to 1538
- Westropp, Thomas Johnson (1907). "The Principal Ancient Castles of the County Limerick: Part II Tudor Period". The Journal of the Royal Society of Antiquaries of Ireland. 37 (2): 153–164. JSTOR 25507604.
- Webb, Alfred (1878). "Desmond, James, 13th Earl". Compendium of Irish Biography. Dublin: M. H. Gill & Son. p. 140. OCLC 122693688.
- Wills, Rev. James (1840). "James Ninth Earl of Ormonde". Lives of Illustrious and Distinguished Irishmen, from the earliest times to the present period. Vol. II. Dublin: MacGregor, Polson & Co. pp. 471–473.

Peerage of Ireland
Preceded by John FitzGerald and James FitzGerald	Earl of Desmond; 1st creation 1536–1558	Succeeded by Gerald FitzGerald
