= James Butler, 9th Earl of Ormond =

Irish nobleman (died 1546)

James Butler
- Earl of Ormond
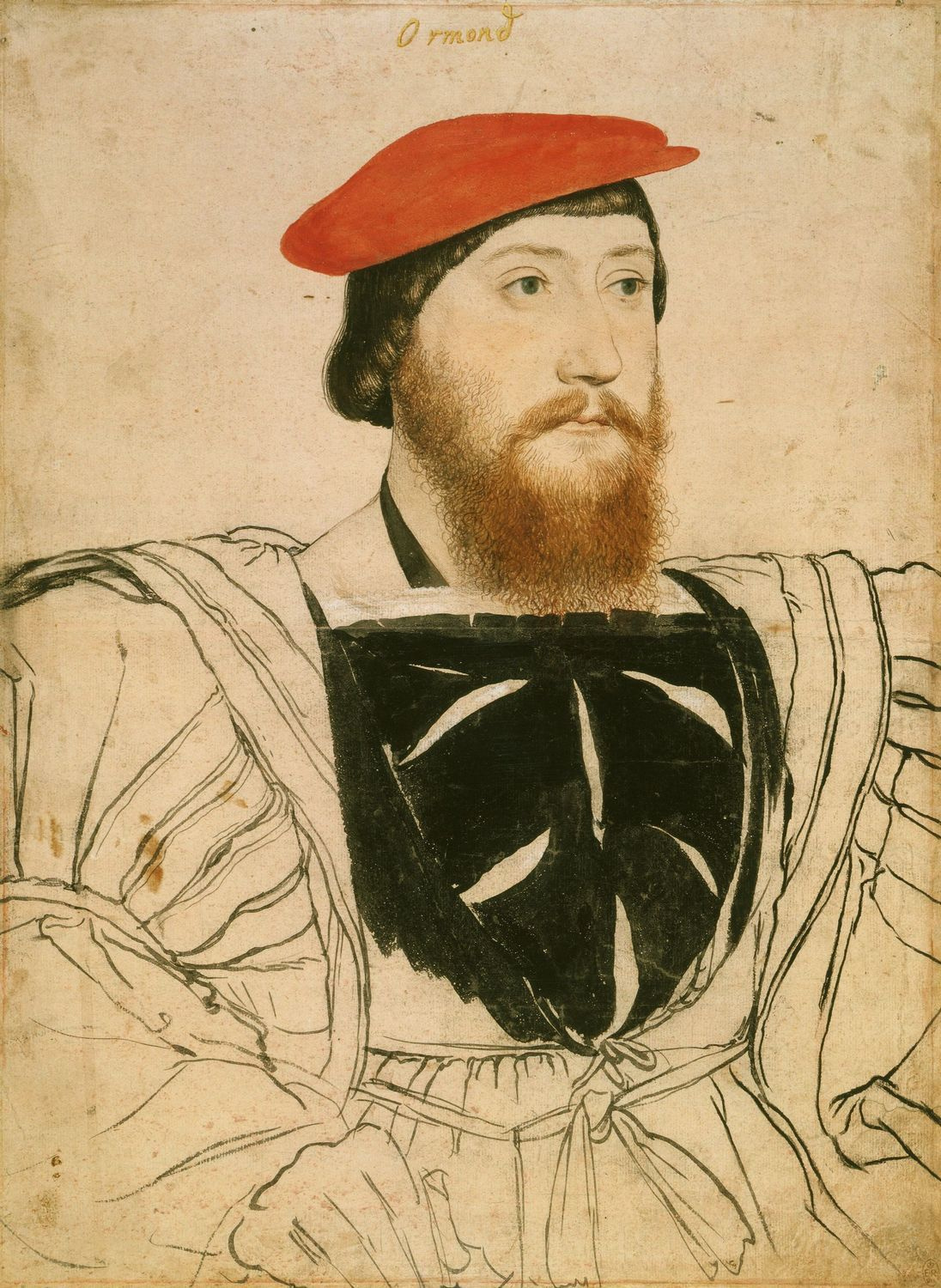
- Detail from the portrait below
- Tenure: 1539–1546
- Predecessor: Piers, 8th Earl of Ormond
- Successor: Thomas, 10th Earl of Ormond
- Born: c. 1496; Ireland
- Died: 28 October 1546 (aged 49–50); London, England
- Spouse: Joan FitzGerald
- Issue Detail: Thomas, Edmund, John, Walter, James, & others
- Father: Piers Butler
- Mother: Margaret FitzGerald

James Butler, 9th Earl of Ormond and 2nd Earl of Ossory (c. 1496 – 1546), known as the Lame (Irish: Bacach), was in 1541 confirmed as Earl of Ormond thereby ending the dispute over the Ormond earldom between his father, Piers Butler, 8th Earl of Ormond, and Thomas Boleyn, 1st Earl of Wiltshire. Butler died from poison in London.

== Birth and origins ==
Family tree

James Butler with wife, parents, and other selected relatives. (Note: This family tree is partly based on the condensed Butler family tree pictured in Dunboyne and on genealogies of the earls of Desmond and Ormond. Also see the lists of siblings and children in the text.)

James; Butler d. 1487 of Polestown	Sabh; Kavanagh
Piers; 8th Earl; 1467–1539	Margaret; FitzGerald c. 1473 – 1542	James; 10th Earl; Desmond d. 1529	Amy; O'Brien
James; 9th Earl c. 1496 – 1546	Joan; FitzGerald d. 1565
Thomas; 10th Earl c. 1531 – 1614; Black Tom	Elizabeth; Sheffield	John of Kilcash d. 1570	Katherine; MacCarthy
Theobald; Viscount; Tulleophelim d. 1613	Elizabeth; Butler c. 1585 – 1628	Richard; Preston; 1st Earl; Desmond d. 1628	Walter; 11th Earl; 1559 – 1633 'Beads'	Helen; Butler d. 1631

Legend

XXX	Subject of the article	XXX	Earls of Ormond	XXX	Earls of Desmond

James was born about 1496 in Ireland, the eldest son of Piers Butler, 8th Earl of Ormond and his wife Margaret FitzGerald.

At the time of his birth, his father was a contender in line for the succession of Thomas Butler, 7th Earl of Ormond, being a descendant of James Butler, 3rd Earl of Ormond. His father's family, the Butlers, were an Old English dynasty that descended from Theobald Walter, who had been appointed chief butler of Ireland by King Henry II in 1177.

Thomas's mother was a daughter of Gerald FitzGerald, 8th Earl of Kildare and his first wife, Alison FitzEustace. Her family, the Geraldines, also were an Old English family. His parents had married in 1485. He was one of nine siblings, who are listed in his father's article.

== Early life ==
As a young man Butler went with Henry VIII to France and was wounded in a leg at the siege of Thérouanne in 1513, hence his sobriquet the Lame or Bocach.

On 3 August 1515, the 7th Earl of Ormond died in London. His father was heir male and succeeded. About 1520 James joined the household of Cardinal Thomas Wolsey, who praised him as a young gentleman "both wise and discreet". In early 1522, it was proposed by King Henry VIII that he marry his cousin Anne Boleyn, who was the great-granddaughter of Thomas Butler, 7th Earl of Ormond. The purpose was to resolve a dispute between her father, Thomas Boleyn, 1st Earl of Wiltshire, and his father over the Ormond inheritance and title; Wolsey himself supported the proposal. The marriage negotiation came to a halt for unknown reasons. On 18 February 1528, the King forced his father to resign the earldom of Ormond, which was given to Thomas Boleyn.

== Marriage and children ==
In 1530 Butler married Joan Fitzgerald. She was the daughter and heiress of the other great Munster landholder, the 10th Earl of Desmond and his wife Amy O'Brien.

James and Joan had seven sons:

1. Thomas Butler, 10th Earl of Ormond (1531–1614), known as Black Tom, the 10th Earl of Ormond, his successor
2. Edmund (1534–1602), of Cloughgrenan, married Eleanor Eustace and had three sons, among whom were Theobald of Tulleophelim
3. John (before 1546 – 1570), of Kilcash, married Katherine MacCarty, daughter of Cormac na Haoine MacCarthy Reagh, 10th Prince of Carbery, and had a son Walter
4. Walter (died 1560) of Nodstown
5. James of Duiske, married Margaret, daughter of James Tobin
6. Edward of Ballinahinch, married first Eleanor FitzGerald, daughter of James Fitzjohn FitzGerald, 13th Earl of Desmond, and secondly Mary Bourke, daughter of Richard Burke, 4th Earl of Clanricarde by his wife Frances Walsingham
7. Piers of Grantstown married Katherine, daughter of John, 2nd Lord Power of Curraghmore

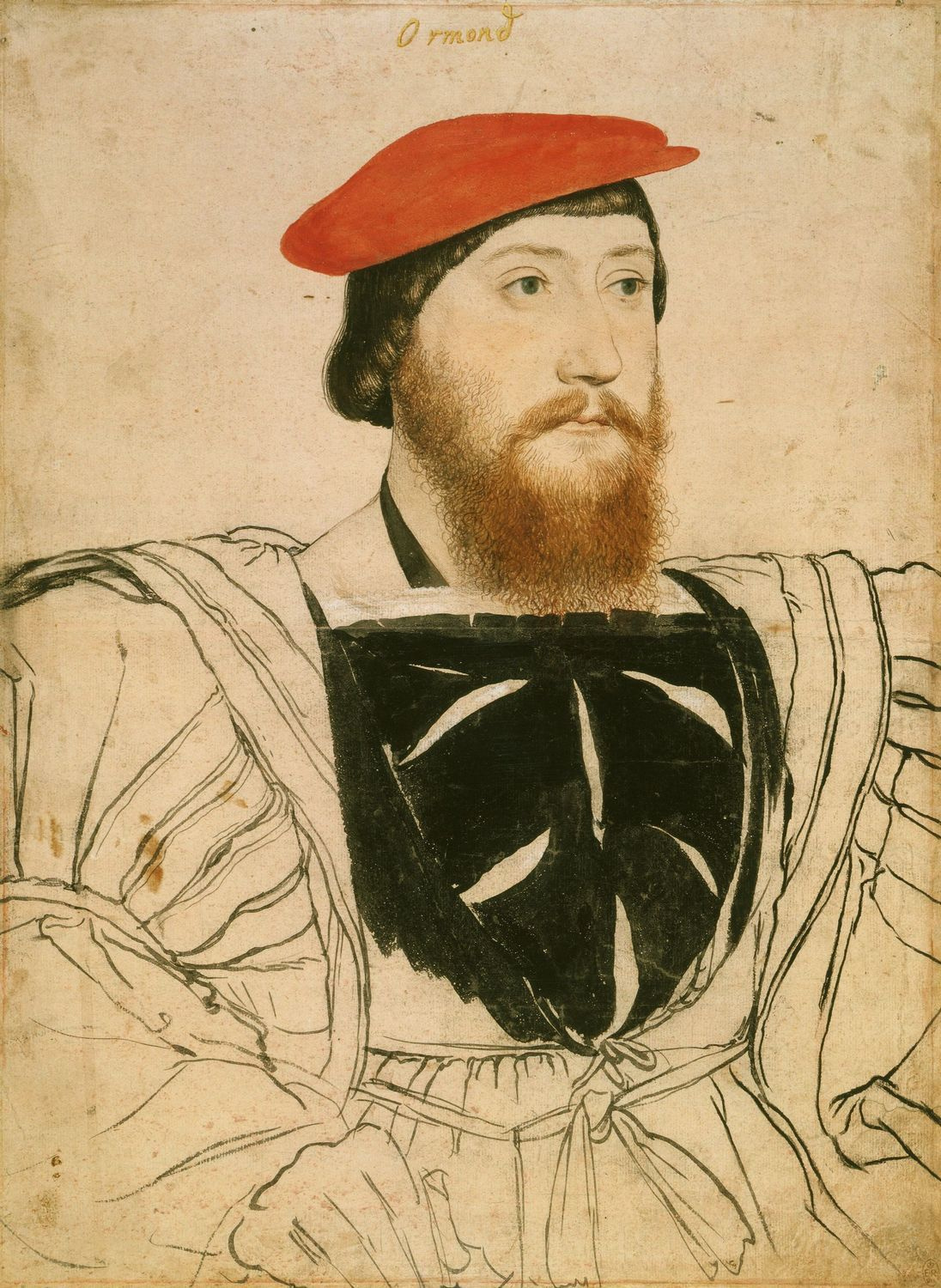
Portrait study by Hans Holbein the Younger, c. 1533. (Note: The portrait was previously thought to be that of his cousin, Thomas Boleyn, but it has been officially identified as the 9th Earl of Ormond.)

== Later life ==
One of the heirs general to the Ormond inheritance was Thomas Boleyn, whose mother was a Butler. Boleyn was the father of Anne, whose star was rising at the court of King Henry VIII of England. As the king wanted the titles of Ormond and Wiltshire for Thomas Boleyn, he induced Piers Butler's father and his coheirs to resign their claims on 18 February 1528. Aided by the king's Chancellor, Cardinal Thomas Wolsey, Butler was granted the earldom of Ossory instead.

Butler was created, in 1535, Viscount Thurles. In 1537, Thomas Boleyn, Earl of Ormond died without a son, whereupon the King on 22 February 1538, restored the earldom of Ormond to Butler's father.

Viscount Thurles's father died on 26 August 1539 and was buried in St Canice's Cathedral, Kilkenny. Thurles succeeded as the 9th Earl of Ormond and was confirmed by Act of Parliament, 6 November 1541, in the Earldom of Ormond, with the pre-eminence of the original earls. Cokayne, in his Complete Peerage numbers him the 10th Earl of Ormond because he counts Thomas Boleyn as the 9th.

In the early 1540s, Lord Ormond, as he now was, gradually restored the Butler dynasty to their former position of influence, leading to antagonism from the quarrelsome Lord Deputy of Ireland, Sir Anthony St Leger. St Leger gave Ormond command of the Irish forces in the Anglo-Scottish War of 1544. On the face of it, this was an honour, but allies of Ormond accused St Leger of deliberately sending Ormond into danger.

Ormond himself demanded an inquiry into claims that St Leger had planned his murder, and the matter was thought to merit a Privy Council investigation; the Council found in favour of St Leger and he and Ormond were ordered to work together amicably in future. Key allies of Ormond like John Alan and Walter Cowley were removed from office, and Ormond was struggling to maintain his standing when he was poisoned.

== Poisoning and timeline ==
On 17 October 1546, James was in London with many of his household. They were invited to dine at Ely Palace in Holborn. He was poisoned along with his steward, James Whyte, and 16 of his household. He died eleven days later, on 28 October, leaving Joan a widow in her thirties.

It is surprising, in view of Ormond's high social standing, that no proper investigation into his death was carried out. Whoever was behind the poisoning remains a mystery. His host at the dinner, John Dudley, 1st Duke of Northumberland, though he could be notably ruthless towards his enemies, had no motive for the crime, as he had no quarrel with Ormond. A recent historian remarks that it would be an extraordinary coincidence if St Leger had no part in the sudden and convenient removal of his main Irish opponent.

Timeline
As his birth date is uncertain, so are all his ages. Italics for historical background.
Age	Date	Event
0	About 1496	Born
12–13	22 Apr 1509	Accession of Henry VIII, succeeding Henry VII of England
16–17	1513	Wounded at the siege of Thérouanne.
18–19	3 Aug 1515	His father's distant cousin, the 7th Earl of Ormond died in London.
33–34	1530	Married Joan Fitzgerald, daughter of 10th Earl of Desmond.
34–35	About Feb 1531	Eldest son, Thomas, born (Note: Authors agree that his son Thomas was born in the early 1530s. Edwards (2004) says "about February 1531"; Cokayne and Lee say 1532.)
42–43	26 Aug 1539	Succeeded his father as 9th Earl of Ormond.
49–50	28 Oct 1546	Died poisoned in London

== Offices held ==
- Esquire of the Body to King Henry VIII, (1527)
- Lord High Treasurer of Ireland, (1532–1546)
- Privy Counsellor of Ireland, (1535)
- Admiral of Ireland, (1535–1539)
- Constable of Kilkea Castle, (1537)
- Constable of Carlow Castle, (1537)
- General in the Irish Forces, (1545)

== See also ==
- Hore Abbey
- Kells Priory which came into the Earl's possession in March 1540 following the Dissolution of the monasteries.

== Notes and references ==
=== Sources ===
- Burke, Bernard (1883). A Genealogical History of the Dormant, Abeyant, Forfeited and Extinct Peerages of the British Empire (New ed.). London: Harrison. OCLC 499232768.
- Burke, Bernard; Burke, Ashworth Peter (1915). A Genealogical and Heraldic History of the Peerage and Baronetage, the Privy Council, Knightage and Companionage (77th ed.). London: Harrison. OCLC 1155471554.
- Butler, William F. T. (1929). "The Descendants of James, Ninth Earl of Ormond". The Journal of the Royal Society of Antiquaries of Ireland. 6th. 19 (1): 29–44. JSTOR 25513504.
- Cokayne, George Edward (1895). Complete Peerage of England, Scotland, Ireland, Great Britain and the United Kingdom, Extant, Extinct, or Dormant. Vol. VI (1st ed.). London: George Bell and Sons. OCLC 1180818801. – N to R (for Ormond)
- Debrett, John (1828). Peerage of the United Kingdom of Great Britain and Ireland. Vol. II (17th ed.). London: F. C. and J. Rivington. OCLC 54499602. – Scotland and Ireland
- Dunboyne (1968). Butler Family History (2nd ed.). Kilkenny: Rothe House.
- Edwards, Robert Dudley (1977). Ireland in the Age of the Tudors: The Destruction of the Hiberno-Norman Civilization. London: Croom Helm. ISBN 978-0-85664-454-2.
- Edwards, David (2004). "Butler, Thomas, tenth earl of Ormond and third earl of Ossory (1531–1558)". In Matthew, Henry Colin Gray; Harrison, Brian (eds.). Oxford Dictionary of National Biography. Vol. 9. New York: Oxford University Press. pp. 220–225. ISBN 0-19-861359-8.
- Fraser, Antonia (2012) [1st pub. 1992]. The Six Wives of Henry VIII. London: Phoenix. ISBN 978-1-7802-2183-0.
- Fryde, Edmund Boleslaw; Greenway, D. E.; Porter, S.; Roy, I., eds. (1986). Handbook of British Chronology. Royal Historical Society Guides and Handbooks, No. 2 (3rd ed.). London: Offices of the Royal Historical Society. ISBN 0-86193-106-8. – (for timeline)
- Lee, Sidney (1886). "Butler, Thomas, tenth Earl of Ormonde (1532–1614)". In Lee, Sidney (ed.). Dictionary of National Biography. Vol. VIII. New York: MacMillan and Co. pp. 79–81. OCLC 8544105.
- Lodge, John (1789). Archdall, Mervyn (ed.). The Peerage of Ireland or, A Genealogical History of the Present Nobility of that Kingdom. Vol. IV. Dublin: James Moore. OCLC 264906028. – Viscounts (for Viscount Mountgarret)
- Murray, James (2009). Enforcing the English Reformation in Ireland. Cambridge: Cambridge University Press. ISBN 978-0-521-77038-5.
- Starkey, David (1981). "Holbein's Irish Sitter?". The Burlington Magazine. 123 (938): 300–301, 303. JSTOR 880241.
- Wright, Stephen (2004). "Butler, James, ninth earl of Ormond and second earl of Ossory (b in or after 1496, d. 1546)". In Matthew, Henry Colin Gray.; Harrison, Brian (eds.). Oxford Dictionary of National Biography. Vol. 9. New York: Oxford University Press. pp. 151–153. ISBN 0-19-861359-8.

Peerage of Ireland
Preceded by Piers Butler	Earl of Ormond; Earl of Ossory; 1539–1546	Succeeded by Thomas Butler
New creation	Viscount Thurles; 1535–1546	Succeeded by Thomas Butler
