= Toirdhealbhach Ó Briain =

Toirdhealbhach Ó Briain (some sources Terence) (died 1569), stylised in English as Turlough O'Brien, was a bishop in Ireland during the second half of the sixteenth century.

Ó Briain was appointed Bishop of Killaloe on 25 June 1554 when they were temporarily reunited under Queen Mary I: in a letter of 12 October 1561, the papal legate Fr David Wolfe SJ described all the bishops in Munster as 'adherents of the Queen';
