= Thomas FitzGerald, 11th Earl of Desmond =

Thomas FitzGerald
- Earl of Desmond
- Tenure: 1529-1534
- Predecessor: James FitzMaurice FitzGerald
- Successor: John FitzGerald, de facto 12th Earl of Desmond; James FitzGerald, de jure 12th Earl of Desmond
- Born: 1454
- Died: 1534 (aged 79–80); Rathkeale
- Buried: Youghal
- Spouse: Katherine FitzGerald
- Issue: Maurice FitzGerald
- Parents: Thomas FitzJames FitzGerald; Ellice de Barry

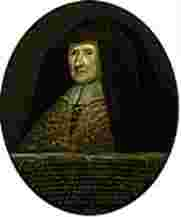
National Portrait Gallery, 18th-century portrait of a lady believed to have been the Countess of Desmond

Thomas FitzGerald, 11th Earl of Desmond (1454 - 1534) was the uncle of James FitzGerald, 10th Earl of Desmond.

Writing in 1878, Alfred Webb states of this earl that:

"[He] succeeded on his nephew's death in 1529. He was known as Thomas the Bald and Thomas the Victorious. 'Far-famed was he in feats of arms; in nine battles did he win the palm of victory... Another subject for congratulation had this Earl — the two Lords of Muskerry fell beneath his sword.'[147a] Lodge tells us that 'the King without hesitation established him in the earldom, merely endeavouring with friendly phrases to induce him to send his grandson and heir to his Majesty's court; which, with phrases equally amiable, the Earl showed the impossibility of his doing.' Eventually embarrassments attendant on the question of the succession obliged him to make every profession of loyalty to the King. He died at Rathkeale in 1534, aged 80, and was buried at Youghal."

Connections with Spain were particularly strong and, in April 1529, Thomas Fitzgerald, the 11th Earl of Desmond and Don Gonzalez Fernandez, the ambassador of Emperor Charles V, signed the Treaty of Dingle. This treaty established the rights and privileges of Irish emigrants and exiles in Habsburg territories. Dingle was a major site for the import of wine, and also a major embarkation port for pilgrims to travel to the shrine of Saint James at Santiago de Compostela.

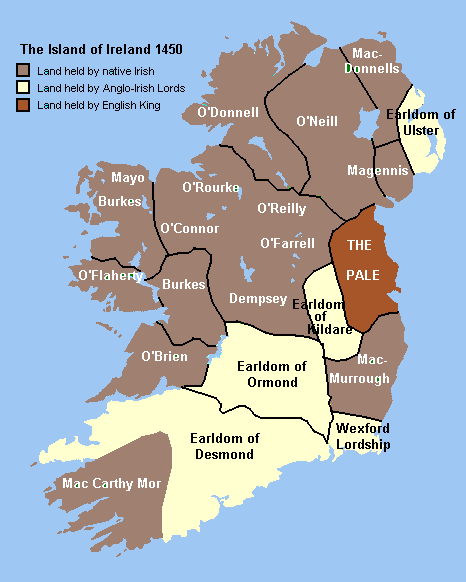
Ireland in 1450, showing the Earldom of Desmond

Thomas's wife was the Old Countess of Desmond, Katherine FitzGerald, born around 1460. A portrait in Britain's National Portrait Gallery is captioned:

"As she appeared at ye Court of our Sovereign Lord, King James, in thys present AD. 1614, and in ye 140th Yeare of her Age. Thither She came from Bristol, to seek Relief, ye House of Desmond having been ruined by Attainder. She was married in ye Reigne of King Edward IV and in ye course of her long Pilgrimage, renewed her Teeth Twice. Her principal residence is at Inchiquin, in Munster, whither she undauntedlye proposeth (her Purpose accomplished) incontinentlie to return. Laus Deo".

She is said to have died at the age of 140 when she fell out of a cherry tree in the garden of her castle at Inchiquin while harvesting the fruit, though this is unlikely.

Ancestors of Thomas FitzGerald, 11th Earl of Desmond

Maurice FitzGerald, 1st Earl of Desmond
Gerald FitzGerald, 3rd Earl of Desmond
Aveline fitz Nicholas
James FitzGerald, 6th Earl of Desmond
James Butler, 2nd Earl of Ormond
Eleanor Butler
Elizabeth Darcy
Thomas FitzGerald, 7th Earl of Desmond
William de Burgh
Mary de Burgh
Thomas FitzThomas FitzGerald, 11th Earl of Desmond
William Barry, 8th Baron Barry
Ellice de Barry
Ellen de la Roche

Peerage of Ireland
Preceded by James FitzMaurice FitzGerald	Earl of Desmond; 1529–1534	Succeeded by John FitzGerald, de facto 12th Earl of Desmond and James FitzGerald, de jure 12th Earl of Desmond
