= John FitzGerald, de facto 12th Earl of Desmond =

16th-century Irish earl

John FitzGerald
- Earl of Desmond
- Tenure: 1534-1536
- Predecessor: Thomas FitzGerald, 11th Earl of Desmond
- Successor: James FitzGerald, de jure 12th Earl of Desmond
- Born: Youghal, Cork, Ireland
- Died: December 1536; Dominican Abbey, Tralee, Ireland
- Spouse: Móre O'Brien
- Issue Detail: James FitzGerald, 13th Earl of Desmond & others
- Father: Thomas FitzGerald, 7th Earl of Desmond
- Mother: Ellice de Barry

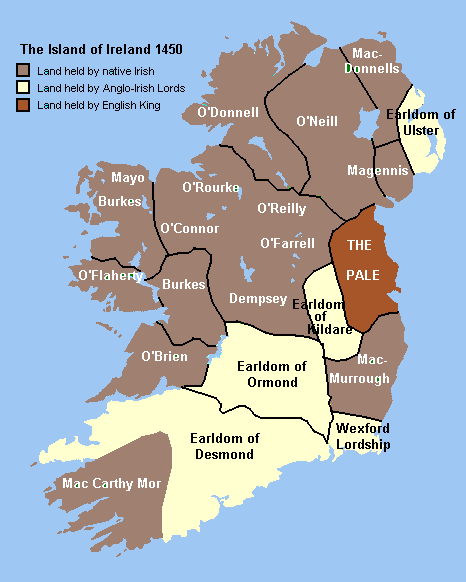
Ireland in 1450, showing the Earldom of Desmond

John FitzGerald, de facto 12th Earl of Desmond (died December 1536) was the brother of Thomas FitzGerald, 11th Earl of Desmond. Upon his brother's death in 1534, John disputed the claim to the earldom of his brother's grandson, James FitzGerald, de jure 12th Earl of Desmond.

According to the Annals of the Four Masters, John FitzThomas FitzGerald was believed to have instigated the murder of his older brother, James FitzGerald, 8th Earl of Desmond in 1487, and had been expelled by his brother Maurice FitzGerald, 9th Earl of Desmond.

John died in 1536. His grandnephew, the de jure earl, died in 1540, and was succeeded by John's son, James FitzGerald, 13th Earl of Desmond.

Alfred Webb tells us of this earl that he, "being supported by a large faction, was de facto [12th] Earl. This Sir John died about Christmas 1536."

Ancestors of John FitzGerald, de facto 12th Earl of Desmond

Gerald FitzGerald, 3rd Earl of Desmond
James FitzGerald, 6th Earl of Desmond
Eleanor Butler
Thomas FitzGerald, 7th Earl of Desmond
Mary de Burgh
John FitzGerald, de facto 12th Earl of Desmond
John FitzDavid Barry, 7th Baron Barry
William Barry, 8th Baron Barry
Ellice FitzGerald
Ellice de Barry
Ellen de la Roche

Peerage of Ireland
Preceded by Thomas FitzThomas FitzGerald	Earl of Desmond; 1534–1536	Succeeded by James FitzThomas FitzGerald (de jure) and James FitzJohn FitzGerald
