= James Fitzedmund Fitzgerald =

John Fitzedmund Fitzgerald (died 1589) was the hereditary Seneschal of Imokilly, an Irish nobleman of the Welsh-Norman FitzGerald dynasty in the province of Munster, who rebelled against the crown during the reign of Queen Elizabeth I of England.

Fitzgerald was the son of Edmund Fitzmaurice Riskald and Shylie, daughter of Sir Maolrony McShane O'Carroll, lord of Ely O'Carroll in Éile), and the family's territory was in modern County Cork.

== First Desmond Rebellion ==
During the first of the Desmond Rebellions in 1569, Fitzgerald was besieged in Ballymartyr by the lord deputy of Ireland, Sir Henry Sidney, and having taken casualties he fled with his company through a bog which was hard by the walls of the town. He held out with his fellow rebel, James Fitzmaurice Fitzgerald in the woods of Aherlow till February 1573, when he submitted with Fitzmaurice to the President of Munster, Sir John Perrot, and was granted his pardon in the church of Kilmallock. In March 1575 he accompanied Fitzmaurice and the White Knight, Edmund Fitzgibbon, on the La Arganys to Saint-Malo, Brittany, where they were received by the governor; he returned in July of the same year. On 16 November 1576 he complained to Lord Justice Sir William Drury that Gerald Fitzgerald, 15th Earl of Desmond, was coshering 60 horse and 100 horseboys on his territory.

== Second Desmond Rebellion ==
On Fitzmaurice's landing in July 1579 at the start of the Second Desmond Rebellion, Fitzgerald went into rebellion instantly. After Fitzmaurice's untimely death he, rather than Desmond, became the real leader of the rebellion, receiving the brunt of the crown's offensive under the command of Sir Thomas Butler, 3rd Earl of Ormonde. It was often reported that he had been killed, but he survived many engagements, despite a severe wound and the death of his brother. In February 1581 he almost captured Sir Walter Raleigh. In May 1583, as the rebellion petered out, his mother was executed by Ormond. On 14 June he submitted on conditions, having only 24 sword and 4 horse left at his command. Ormond respected his bravery and pleaded with the queen's secretary, Sir William Cecil, for his pardon. His lands became a serious controversy in the subsequent plantation of Munster, and he was considered a main route for Spanish intelligence. In March 1587 he was arrested by Sir Thomas Norris and confined in Dublin Castle, where he died in February 1589, a few days after it had been decided that he should enjoy the profit of his lands.

== Legacy ==
Fitzgerald married Honora Fitzmaurice, who bore him male twins in about 1589, and two daughters. His heir was granted in wardship, at the age of one and a half years, to one Captain Moyle.
