= John Fitzedmund Fitzgerald =

Irish nobleman and revolutionary

- Born: County Cork, Ireland
- Died: 1589; Dublin Castle, Ireland
- Occupation: seneschal of Imokilly

John Fitzedmund Fitzgerald (died 1589) was the hereditary Seneschal of Imokilly (Imokilly is the area around Youghal, both words deriving from Eochaill, meaning a yew wood), an Irish nobleman of the originally Anglo-Welsh-Norman FitzGerald dynasty in the province of Munster.

== Life ==
Fitzgerald was the son of Edmund Fitzmaurice Riskard, seneschal of Imokilly, and Shylie, daughter of Sir Maolrony McShane O'Carroll, lord of Ely. He was a prominent actor in the two great conflicts between the English and Irish that convulsed Munster from 1563 to 1583. In 1569, being "a principal communicator with James FitzMaurice FitzGerald, arch traitor", he was besieged in his castle at Ballymartyr by Sir Henry Sidney; but after a stout defence, in which several of the besiegers were wounded, finding the place untenable, he "and his company in the dead of night fled out of the house by a bog, which joins hard to the wall where no watch could have prevented their escape".

He continued to hold out with Fitzmaurice in the woods of the Glen of Aherlow till February 1573, when he submitted himself before Sir John Perrot in the church of Kilmallock, and was pardoned. In 1575, he accompanied Fitzmaurice to France, but returned to Ireland a few weeks afterwards. From that time till the date of Fitzmaurice's landing we hear nothing of him, with the exception that on 16 November 1576, he complained to the president of Munster, Sir William Drury, that the Earl of Desmond was coshering 60 horses and a hundred horse-boys on Imokilly, an incident quite sufficient to show how the wind was blowing meanwhile.

On the arrival of Fitzmaurice in July 1579, he went into rebellion. He took part in the Second Desmond Rebellion. An adept in all the stratagems of Irish warfare, and personally brave in carrying his schemes into execution, he became, after the death of the "arch traitor", the unquestionable, though not nominal, head of the rebellion. It was against him, and not the Earl of Desmond, that Ormonde mainly directed his efforts. More than once during that terrible struggle, he was reported to have been slain. He was, indeed, once severely wounded and his brother killed, but he manifested no intention of submitting. In February 1581, he narrowly missed capturing Sir Walter Raleigh. Philip O'Sullivan Beare in his 1621 history of the Elizabethan wars reported that in 1581 "a company of English soldiers, distinguished by their dress and arms, who were called "red coats" [Vestibus et armis insignis erat cohors Anglorum quae "Sagorum rubrorem" nominabantur], being sent to war [in Ireland] by the Queen were overwhelmed near Lismore by John Fitzgerald, the seneschal". In May 1583, 'Black Tom', Thomas Butler, 10th Earl of Ormond, captured James's aged mother, Shylie O'Carroll and 'executed' her, hanging the old lady in Cork. But it was not till 14 June, when he was reported to have not more than 24 swords and four horse, that he consented to recognise the hopelessness of his cause. His submission was accepted conditionally; but Ormonde, who greatly respected him for his bravery, pleaded earnestly with Elizabeth I's spymaster Burghley for his pardon. He was, he declared, a man "valiant, wise, and true of his word, and ever since his submission "he and his people had been employed in order and husbandry".

Ormonde's intervention was successful so far as Fitzgerald's life was concerned. As for his lands, that was to be left an open question – 36,000 acres of good land, which Protestant planters known as "undertakers" had been granted ownership over by the Crown, would not be surrendered by them without a struggle. He was represented as the most dangerous man in the province, as "having more intelligence from Spain than anyone else". The planters' representations were not without their calculated effect on Queen Elizabeth I, who had at first been inclined to treat him leniently.

Not suspecting any attack, he was in March 1587, arrested by Sir Thomas Norris and confined to Dublin Castle, where he died in February 1589, a few days after it had been finally decided that he should enjoy the profit of his lands.

His cousin Sir John Fitzedmund Fitzgerald of Cloyne and Ballymaloe House became the next Seneschal of Imokilly.

== Family ==
He married Honora, daughter of James FitzMaurice FitzGerald, by whom he had two sons, Edmund and Richard, seven weeks old in 1589, and two daughters, Catherine and Eleanor. His son and heir, Edmund, at the time of his father's death being a year and a half old, was found by inquisition to be heir to Ballymartyr and other lands in County Cork, and was granted in wardship to Captain Moyle. He obtained livery of his lands on coming of age, and in 1647 defended Ballymartyr against his nephew, Murrough O'Brien, 1st Earl of Inchiquin, when the castle was burnt and himself outlawed.
