= Sack of Youghal =

Sack of the town of Youghal during the Second Desmond Rebellion

- Part of the Second Desmond Rebellion
Date	13 November 1579
Location	Youghal, County Cork, Ireland
Result	Irish victory

Belligerents
Desmond rebels	Kingdom of England

Commanders and leaders
Gerald FitzGerald	Unknown

Casualties and losses
Low	High

The sack of Youghal was the capture of the English-held town of Youghal by Irish rebel forces under the command of the Gerald FitzGerald, the 14th Earl of Desmond on 13 November 1579 as part of the Second Desmond Rebellion. Youghal, a town in the Irish province of Munster, was controlled by the English, making it a target to Irish rebel forces during the rebellion. FitzGerald led an Irish rebel force which captured the city, massacred the English Army garrison, and sacked the town. After news of the sack became known, numerous reprisals were carried out on Catholic non-combatants throughout Ireland.

== Background ==
Following his defeat at the hands of English Crown forces in the First Desmond Rebellion (1569–1573), James FitzMaurice FitzGerald, leader of the rebellion, left Ireland in search of support from Catholic powers on the Continent. After gaining support from the Papacy, he made plans for an invasion of Ireland. A fleet led by FitzMaurice landed near Dingle in July 1579, after capturing a number of English ships in the English Channel. His forces set up camp at Dún an Óir, a fortress in Ard na Caithne (known to the English as Smerwick), beginning the Second Desmond Rebellion. Soon after the conflict began, however, FitzMaurice's fleet was captured by the English.

During the rebellion, the Dublin Castle administration had declared Gerald FitzGerald, 14th Earl of Desmond a traitor; despite the Earl having been reluctant to join the rebellion when it broke out, he chose to cast his lot with FitzMaurice's rebels. FitzMaurice was subsequently killed in a skirmish with troops under the command of his cousin at County Tipperary, and command of the overall rebel force passed to FitzGerald.

== Sack ==
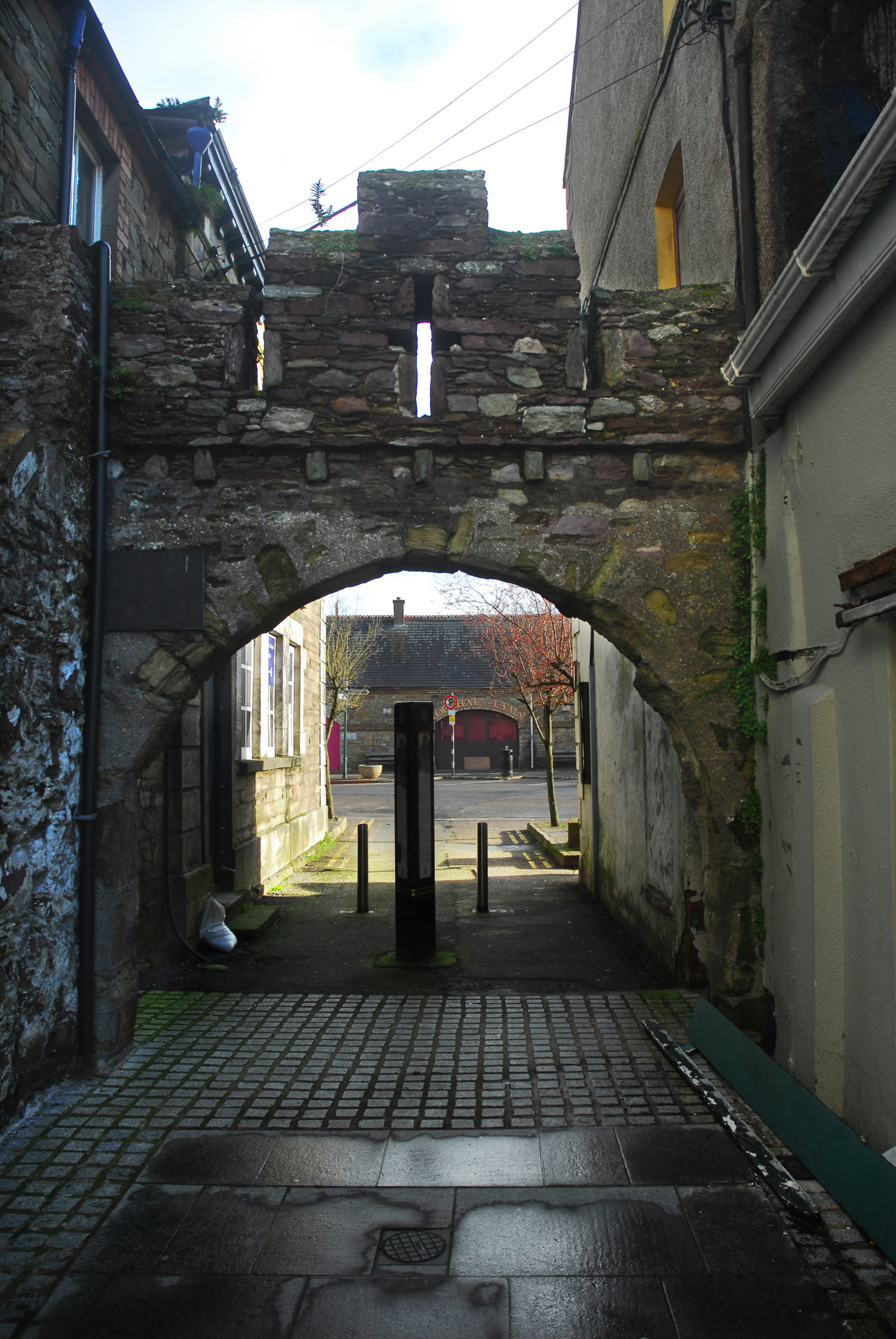
The gate in Youghal where the garrison and the townspeople made their last stand against the Irish rebels

As one of the main bases of English power in southern Munster, the town of Youghal was selected by FitzGerald for attack. The first act which he undertook after the command of the overall rebel force passed to him was to lead an Irish rebel force to attack the town; Youghal was captured by the rebels, and the English Army presence in the town (serving as Youghal's garrison) were massacred. FitzGerald also ordered the execution of a number of English officials by hanging.

His troops then started to brutally sack the town, looting and burning the homes of the townsfolk. A group of soldiers and civilians made a last stand at a town gate but were ultimately overrun and slaughtered. One of FitzGerald's allies, MacCarthy Mór, launched a similar attack on the English-held port of Kinsale. After Youghal was captured, much of the territory around the English-held areas of Munster was ravaged by the native Irish, and a blockade was established around the city of Cork, where numerous people fled to escape the destruction throughout the province.

== Aftermath ==
Crown forces, under Thomas Butler, 10th Earl of Ormond retook Youghal after several weeks. Ormond, believing that the civilian population had aided the rebels (deliberately or through negligence), put Youghal's mayor on trial for treason and executed him.

After news of the sack became known, numerous reprisals were carried out on Catholic non-combatants throughout Ireland. For example, when William Pelham seized the lands of rebel leaders, he "slaughtered the inhabitants" of the estates. In Youghal itself, on 28 March 1580, Franciscan priest Daniel O’Neilan was executed in the town on the orders of its military governor, Sir William Morgan. Later in 1580, following the 3-day Siege of Smerwick, the garrison at Ard na Caithne were massacred by English forces after surrendering.

The rebellion continued until the English Crown emerged victorious in 1583, and initiated the plantation of Munster. FitzGerald went into hiding in 1581 after the tide of war turned against him, but was eventually hunted down and killed in County Kerry.

Youghal would achieve a level of prominence in Irish history again in 1650, when Oliver Cromwell departed Ireland from Youghal having completed his conquest of the island. The gate was restored by the town authorities in the 19th century.

== See also ==
- Battle of Glenmalure
