= Regnans =

Regnans mays refer to :

- Eucalyptus regnans, a species of Eucalyptus native to southeastern Australia.
- Regnans in Excelsis, a papal bull issued in 1570, declaring Queen Elizabeth I to be a heretic.
