= Regnans in Excelsis =

1570 papal bull by Pius V excommunicating Queen Elizabeth I of England

Regnans in Excelsis Latin for 'Reigning on High' Papal bull of Pope Pius V
- Signature date: 25 February 1570
- Subject: Excommunication of Queen Elizabeth I
- Text: In English

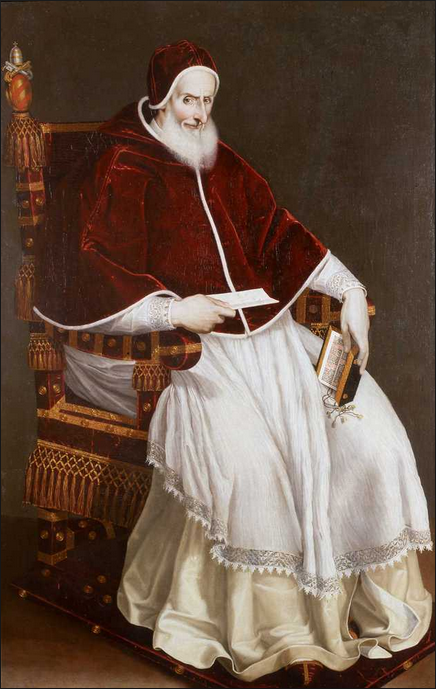
Pope Pius V

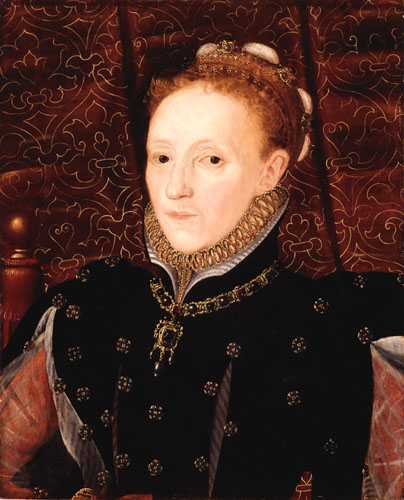
Queen Elizabeth I, c. 1570

Regnans in Excelsis ("Reigning on High") is a papal bull that Pope Pius V issued on 25 February 1570. It excommunicated Queen Elizabeth I of England, referring to her as "the pretended Queen of England and the servant of crime," declared her a heretic, and released her subjects from allegiance to her, even those who had "sworn oaths to her," and excommunicated any who obeyed her orders: "We charge and command all and singular the nobles, subjects, peoples and others afore said that they do not dare obey her orders, mandates and laws. Those who shall act to the contrary we include in the like sentence of excommunication."

Among the queen's offences, "She has removed the royal Council, composed of the nobility of England, and has filled it with obscure men, being heretics; oppressed the followers of the Catholic faith; instituted false preachers and ministers of impiety; abolished the sacrifice of the mass, prayers, fasts, choice of meats, celibacy, and Catholic ceremonies; and has ordered that books of manifestly heretical content be propounded to the whole realm and that impious rites and institutions after the rule of Calvin, entertained and observed by herself, be also observed by her subjects."

The bull, written in Latin, is named from its incipit, the first three words of its text.

== Background ==
The papacy had previously reconciled with Mary I, who returned the Church of England and Church of Ireland to Catholicism. After Mary's death in November 1558, Elizabeth's Parliament passed the Act of Supremacy of 1559, which re-established the Church of England and Church of Ireland's independence from papal authority. This bull can be seen as an act of retaliation for the religious settlement, but it was delayed by eleven years, caused in part by a number of royal Catholic suitors who hoped to marry Elizabeth, and because she had allowed Catholic worship in private.

Pius V issued the bull in support of, but following, the failed Rising of the North of 1569, by which Catholic nobles attempted to depose Elizabeth and replace her with Mary, Queen of Scots, and the first Desmond Rebellion in Ireland, which broke out in June 1569. Although the Desmond Rebellion's main goal was to preserve the independence of feudal lords from the English throne, it developed religious overtones as James FitzMaurice FitzGerald sought support from Catholic Europe.

== Content ==
The bull declared Queen Elizabeth excommunicated and absolved her subjects from any allegiance to her. It also excommunicated any that obeyed her orders. Its argument drew on the hierocratic theory of the papacy established by medieval canonists.

Pius did not consult any Catholic rulers. Both Philip II of Spain and the Holy Roman Emperor Maximilian II disagreed with his approach. Philip thought, correctly, that it would only harden the Crown's treatment of English Catholics. According to Evelyn Waugh, it provided a convenient pretext for those in Elizabeth's court, looking for an excuse to do so, to persecute Roman Catholics, and they took full advantage of it.

To take effect in church law the bull had to be promulgated. This logistical effort relied on individuals such as John Felton.

== Aftermath ==
The bull provoked the English government into taking more repressive actions against the Jesuits, whom they feared to be acting in the interests of Spain and the papacy. This reaction soon seemed justified: it was the publication in England of Pius's exhortation that gave the impetus in 1571 to the Ridolfi plot, in which the Duke of Norfolk was to kidnap or murder Queen Elizabeth, install Mary, Queen of Scots, on the throne, and then become de facto king by marrying her.

Heinrich Bullinger of Zürich published a critique of the bull in 1571.

== Suspension from 1580 to 1584 ==
At the request of the Jesuits and to relieve the pressures on Catholics in England, it was said that Pope Gregory XIII issued a clarification or suspension in 1580, explaining that Catholics should obey the queen outwardly in all civil matters, until such time as a suitable opportunity presented itself for her overthrow. How widely this was communicated to, and understood by, Catholics in England and Ireland is unknown. The evidence against any suspension of the Bull comes from the small invasion of Ireland in 1579 led by James FitzMaurice FitzGerald that was supported by the Papacy. Then in 1580 Pope Gregory sponsored another abortive expedition to Ireland in support of the Second Desmond Rebellion, that ended in the tragic Siege of Smerwick. Soon after the start of the Anglo-Spanish War (1585–1604), an English Act "against Jesuits, seminary priests and other such like disobedient persons" was passed into law.

== Renewal in 1588 ==
In 1588, Pope Sixtus V, in support of the Spanish Armada, renewed the solemn bull of excommunication against Queen Elizabeth I, for the regicide of Mary, Queen of Scots, in 1587 as well as the previously catalogued offences against the Catholic Church. During the threat of invasion by the Spanish Armada, it transpired that most of the Catholic residents in England remained loyal, and that those who were a real threat to the throne, like William, Cardinal Allen and Robert Persons, were already exiles.

While the bull had little impact in England, it caused a rift in Elizabeth's Kingdom of Ireland where most of the population remained Roman Catholic; Gerald FitzGerald, 14th Earl of Desmond, had used the bull as justification for the Second Desmond Rebellion. While divisions had existed before 1570, after the bull the officials based in Dublin conformed to Anglicanism while the majority of the Parliament of Ireland were Catholics until 1613.

== See also ==
- Religion in the United Kingdom
- Cuius regio, eius religio
- Papal deposing power
