= Siege of Carrigafoyle Castle =

16th-century siege in Kerry, Ireland

- Part of the Second Desmond Rebellion
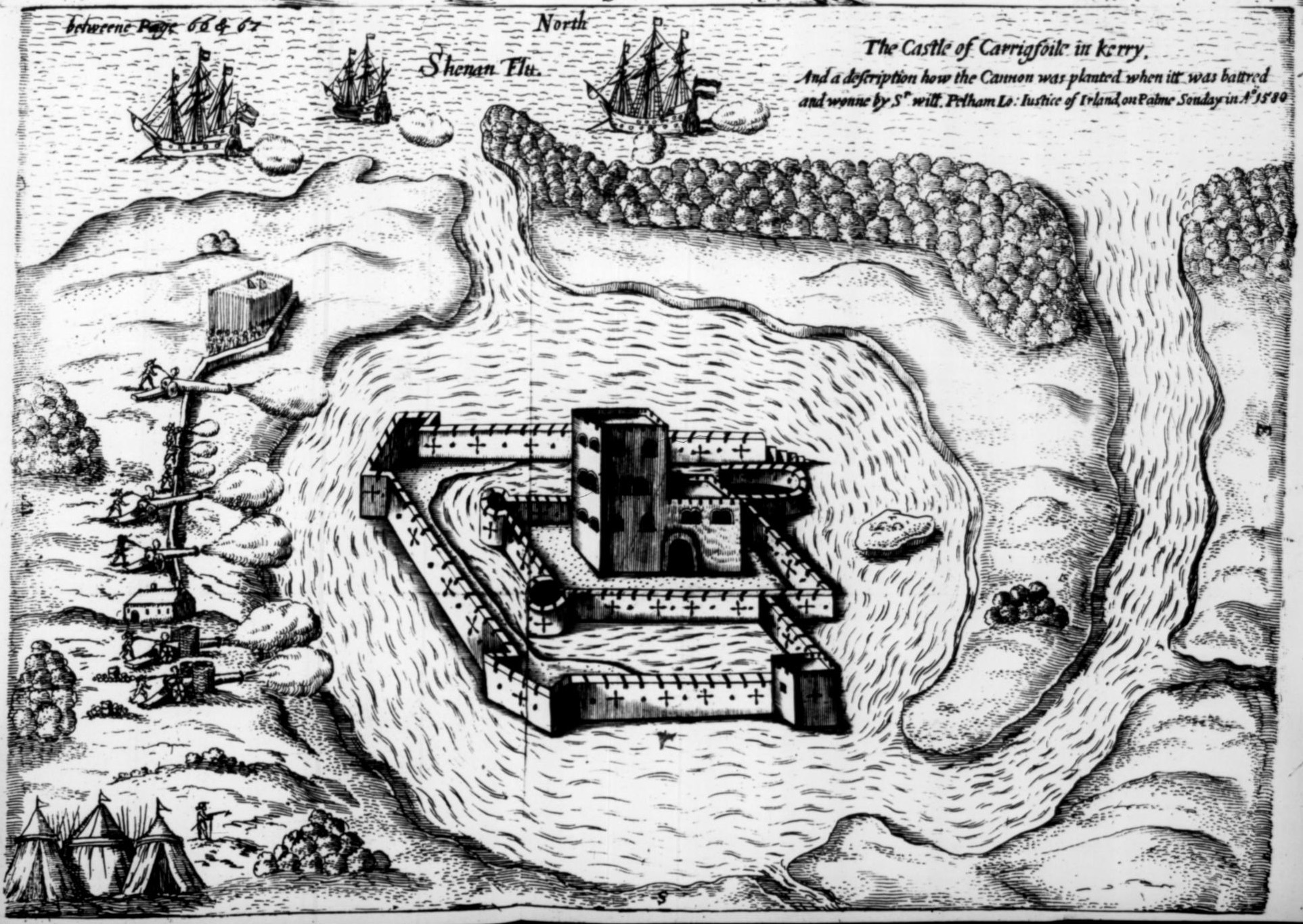
- Map of Pelham's siege included in Pacata Hibernia
Date	Easter 1580
Location	Near Ballylongford, Kerry, Ireland 52.569°N 9.495°W
Result	English victory

Belligerents
Kingdom of England	Irish Rebels

Commanders and leaders
Sir William Pelham	Captain Julian

Strength
~600	66

The siege of Carrigafoyle Castle took place on Easter in 1580 near modern-day Ballylongford, County Kerry, Ireland, on the southern bank of the Shannon estuary. The engagement was part of the English crown's campaign against the forces of Gerald FitzGerald, 14th Earl of Desmond during the Second Desmond Rebellion. The castle was held by rebel troops in the service of Desmond and some Catholic troops from continental Europe.

== Background ==
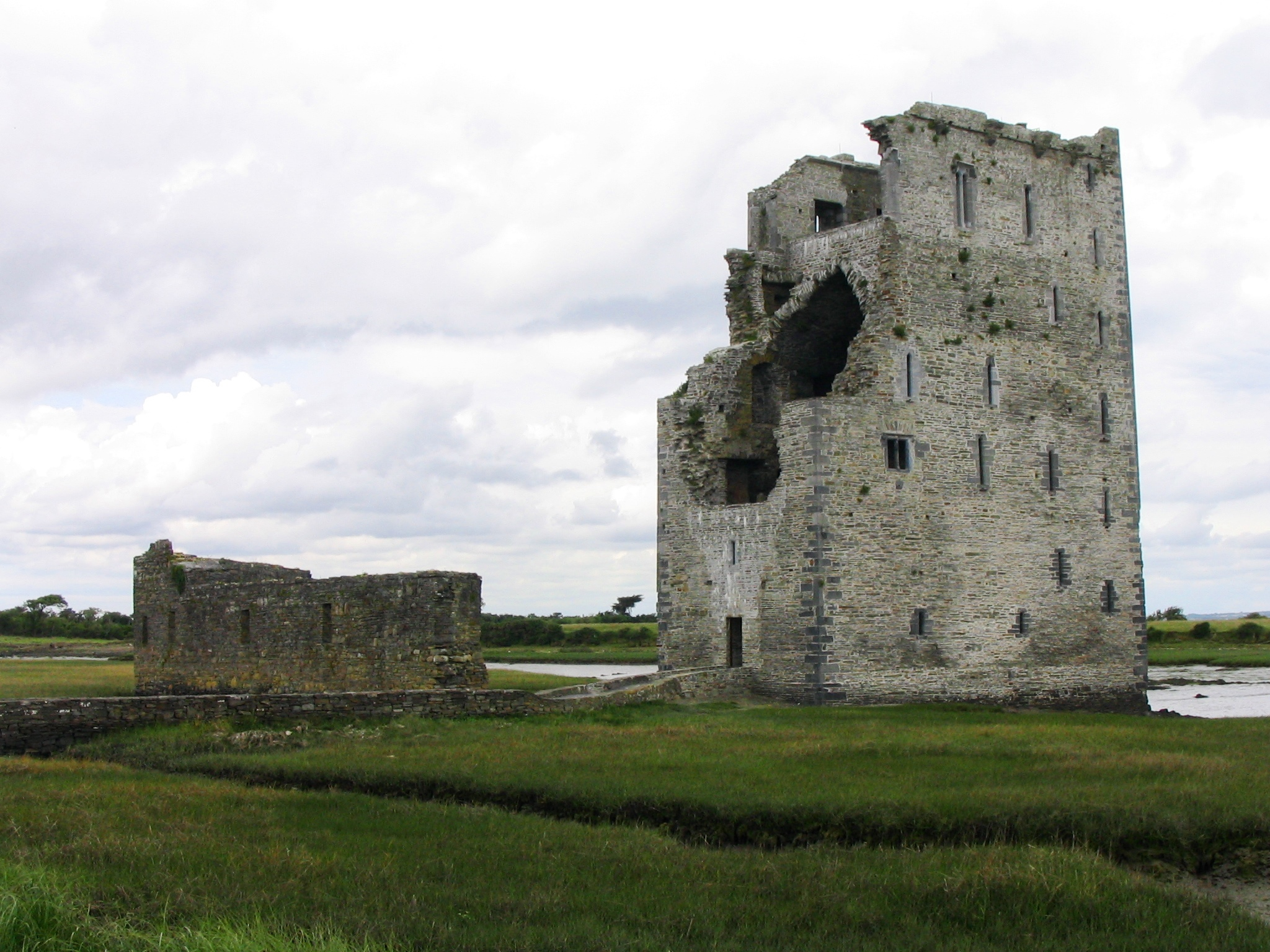
Carrigafoyle Castle on the Southern shores of River Shannon, County Kerry, Ireland.

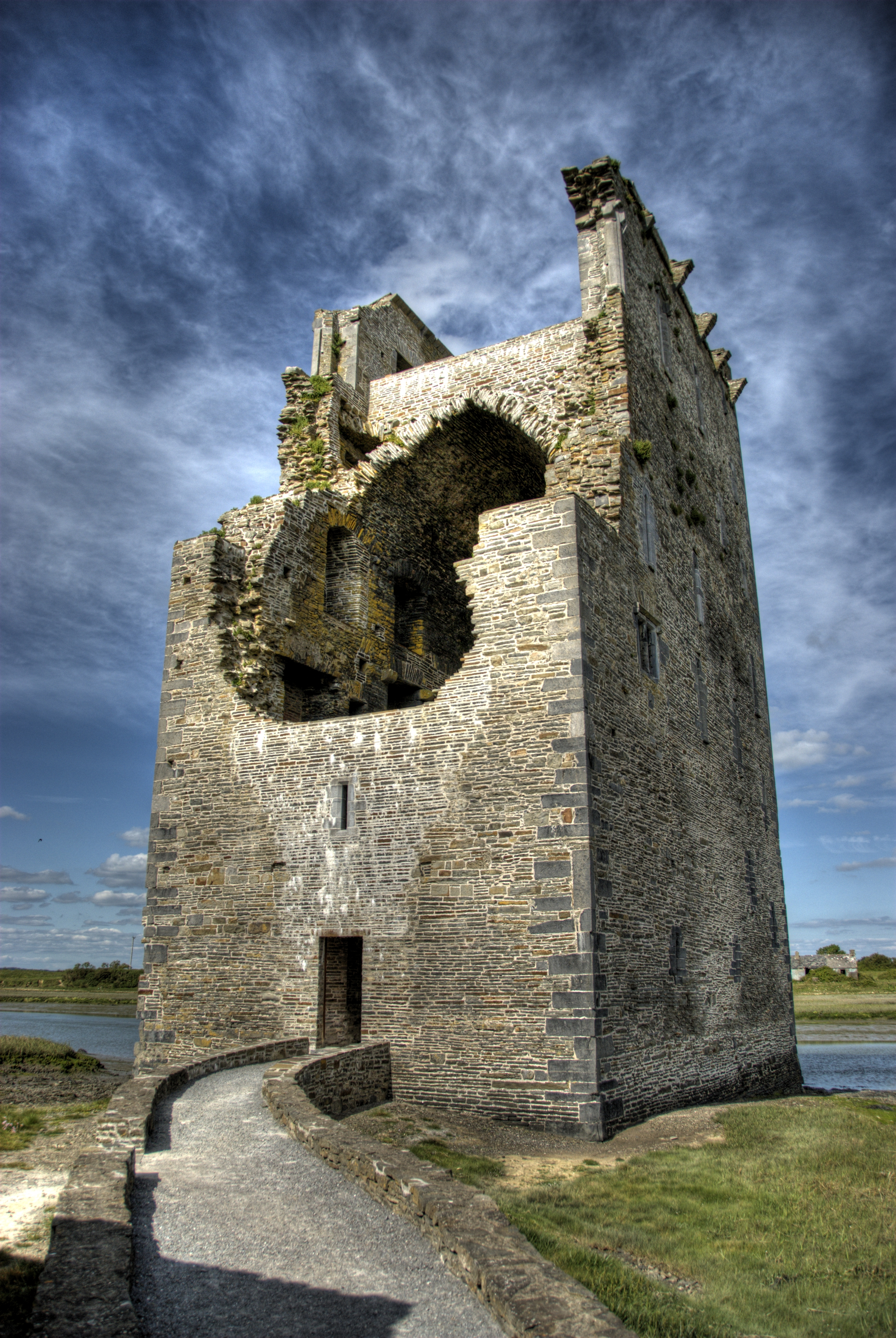
Carrigafoyle Castle today (west wall recently reconstructed to the height of the first floor for safety reasons)

Carrigafoyle Castle – built by Conor Liath O'Connor-Kerry in the 1490s and considered one of the strongest of Irish fortresses – was a large tower house, of the type particularly common across the north of the province of Munster. It stood on a rock in a small bay off the Shannon estuary, and its name is an anglicisation of the Irish, Carraig an Phoill ("rock of the hole").

The castle was known as the guardian of the Shannon because of its strategic command of the shipping lanes that supplied the trading city of Limerick, some 20 miles (32 km) upriver. The bay at Carrigafoyle was shielded from the estuary on the northern side by a wooded island; within the bay the castle-rock was defended on the west and south sides by a double defensive wall; the inner wall enclosed a bawn, and surrounding this was a moat covered on three sides (the east lay open) by the outer wall, where a smaller tower stood. The tower-keep itself was 86 ft high, and the precipitous sides of the castle-rock were layered with bricks and mortar. At high tide the walled landing within the moat was capable of accommodating a ship of 100 tons displacement.

== Siege ==
During the rebellion the castle was held by 50 Irish, along with 16 Spanish soldiers who had landed at Smerwick harbour the previous year in the 1579 Papal invasion; there were also women and children present. Months earlier an Italian engineer, Captain Julian, had set about perfecting the castle's defences under the direction of Desmond's countess, Eleanor. By the time of the siege she had retired to her husband's company - some forty miles (64 km) distant, at Castleisland - while Julian was still at his task.

The English commander, Sir William Pelham, marched through Munster in the company of Sir George Carew and assumed command of an additional 600 troops. He was supported by a fleet of 3 three-masted ships under the command of Sir William Winter. It was the largest army ever seen in the west of Ireland.

On arriving at Carrigafoyle the English camped to the south-west of the castle. The fleet anchored in the estuary beyond the bay and supplied Pelham with 3 demi-cannon and a culverin (a huge naval gun with small projectiles) manned by naval gunners. The ordnance was ranged along a low wall running north, parallel to the outer wall at a distance of 100 yards, and at the northern point of this wall a company of foot with lances was stationed.

The bombardment of the castle was carried out over two days, six hours each day. The demi-cannon could be effective against stone, but only if allowed to fire unhindered - in the event no hindrance was given. In addition Winter's ships fired their stern cannon against the seaward wall of the castle.

On the first day (Palm Sunday) Pelham ordered a party of troops to cross to the sea-wall, where they were pinned down by gunfire and had boulders hurled at them from the battlements. The troops threw up assault ladders, which the Spanish halberdiers pushed away. The Earl of Ormond described seeing the sea-channel fill with wreckage as the sides of the castle-rock became slippery with blood. Pelham was hit by a ricochet and jeered at by the defenders, but there was no pause in the bombardment.

On the second day, Pelham was reinforced with troops from Winter's ships. The final assault, led by Captains Humfrey Mackworth and John Zouche, was concentrated on the part of the tower furthest from the cannon, where the defenders were holding out. The tower cracked under the impact of 2 or 3 shot, and the great west wall collapsed on its foundations, crushing many within. The survivors fled through the shallow waters, but most were shot or put to the sword; the rest (including one woman) were brought back to camp and hanged from trees. Captain Julian was hanged three days later.

== Consequences ==
The strategic significance of the siege is shown in the swiftness with which other Desmond strongholds fell once news of the destruction had spread. The castle at Askeaton was abandoned before the guns (its Spanish defenders blowing up the walls), and the garrisons at Newcastle West, Balliloghan, Rathkeale, and Ballyduff slipped away soon after. The rebels then engaged in guerrilla warfare, and the crown only prevailed against them in 1583, when the Earl of Desmond was killed at Glanageenty in the Slieve Mish mountains near Tralee.

Such was the damage to Carrigafoyle Castle that it was never repaired. Its ruins still stand, including the outer defences and moat, and the effect of the bombardment is clear to see.
