= Second Desmond Rebellion =

Irish rebellion (1579–1583)

- Part of the Tudor conquest of Ireland and Desmond Rebellions
Date	18 July 1579 – 11 November 1583 (4 years, 3 months and 24 days)
Location	Provinces of Munster and Leinster, Ireland
Result	English victory: Famine throughout Munster; Plantation of Munster

Belligerents
FitzGerald of Desmond; MacCarthy of Desmond; Papal States (Spanish Empire) Spain O'Byrne of Leinster	Kingdom of England: Kingdom of Ireland

Commanders and leaders
In Munster: James FitzMaurice FitzGerald; John FitzEdmund FitzGerald; James FitzEdmund FitzGerald; Gerald FitzGerald; John FitzGerald; Donald MacCarthy Mór; Sebastiano di San Giuseppe; Nicholas Sanders; In Leinster: Fiach MacHugh O'Byrne; James Eustace	Arthur Grey; John Perrot; William Pelham; William Stanley; Thomas Butler

Strength
Unknown	Unknown

Casualties and losses
Unknown	Unknown

The Second Desmond Rebellion (1579–1583) was the more widespread and bloody of the two Desmond Rebellions in Ireland launched by the FitzGerald Dynasty of Desmond in Munster against English rule. The second rebellion began in July 1579 when James FitzMaurice FitzGerald landed in Ireland with a force of Papal troops, triggering an insurrection across the south of Ireland on the part of the Desmond dynasty, their allies, and others who were dissatisfied for various reasons with English government of the country. The rebellion ended with the 1583 death of Gerald FitzGerald, 14th Earl of Desmond, and the defeat of the rebels.

The rebellion was in equal part a protest by feudal lords against the intrusion of central government into their domains; an Irish clan reaction to English policies that were destroying traditional Gaelic culture; and a religious conflict, in which the rebellion's leaders considered themselves defending Catholicism against religious persecution by a Protestant queen who had been pronounced a tyrant and a heretic in 1570 by Pope Pius V's bull Regnans in Excelsis.

The result of the rebellions was the destruction of the Desmond dynasty and the subsequent Munster Plantations – the colonisation of Munster with English settlers. In addition, the fighting laid waste to a large part of the south of Ireland. War-related famine and disease are thought to have killed up to a third of Munster's pre-war population.

== Background ==
=== First rebellion, 1569–1573 ===
The Munster branch of the FitzGeralds, known as the Geraldines, were holders of the title Earl of Desmond, which at the time of the rebellions was held by Gerald FitzGerald, 14th Earl of Desmond, referred to here as the Earl of Desmond.

The first Desmond rebellion (1569–73) had been an armed protest against English intrusion into the Desmond territories. Specifically it was against the creation of the office of "Lord President" (governor) in the province of Munster and the English pursuit of policies that favoured the FitzGerald's rivals, the Butlers of Ormonde, and various English colonists. The most pressing grievance of the Geraldines had been the government's arrest of Gerald the Earl and his brother John of Desmond in 1568 for their part in a private war against the Butlers in 1565, which had culminated in the Battle of Affane in County Waterford.

The First Desmond Rebellion was launched in 1569, in the absence of the Desmond leadership, by James FitzMaurice FitzGerald, the "captain general" of the FitzGerald army. That rebellion was quashed by the English crown forces and their Irish allies (primarily the Butlers, led by Thomas Butler, 3rd Earl of Ormonde), and ended in 1573.

=== Outcomes ===
The English response after the first rebellion was conciliation of the Geraldines. Fitzmaurice, the leader of the rebellion, was pardoned and the Earl and his brother John of Desmond were released from imprisonment and returned to their lands. As late as 1579, it looked most unlikely that the FitzGeralds would again challenge English rule in Munster. However, a combination of personal, economic, and religious factors, and the actions of James Fitzmaurice FitzGerald himself, led to an explosion of rebellion in July of that year.

Fitzmaurice, who had led the first rebellion, found himself without property and powerless after peace was restored. Lands that he had inherited were confiscated and colonised by English settlers. The Earl of Desmond was forbidden from exacting military service and quartering his troops on his dependants (a practice known as coyne and livery), and he was reduced to maintaining only 20 horsemen in his private service. This abolition by the government of private armies meant that Fitzmaurice, who was a professional soldier, was without a source of income.

Fitzmaurice was therefore impoverished, and in 1574 he was evicted by the Earl from lands he had been renting since 1573. On top of these discontents, Fitzmaurice also had a genuine commitment to the Catholic Counter-Reformation and a deep antipathy to Protestantism, which had been introduced into Ireland by the English. Fitzmaurice left Ireland for France in 1575, seeking help from Catholic powers to restart the rebellion.

== Second rebellion ==
The factors which drove Fitzmaurice into rebellion also created a wide pool of potential rebels in southern Ireland. Firstly, the disbanded Irish soldiers from various lords' private armies faced destitution and even death in an English-ruled Ireland. In the wake of the first Desmond Rebellion, Henry Sidney, the Lord Deputy of Ireland, and William Drury, the Lord President of Munster, had up to 700 unemployed or "masterless" soldiers executed, judging them to be a danger to the public peace. The surviving mercenary soldiers in Munster would form the backbone of the coming rebellion. Secondly, many of the local Irish Lords felt that their interests were threatened by the English policy of plantations – confiscating land for which the owner did not have an English title and establishing English colonies on it. Thirdly, the imposition of seneschals, or English military governors, in various areas where the local leaders had previously been independent meant that some chieftains, such as Fiach MacHugh O'Byrne of the Wicklow Mountains, were already engaged in a low level war with the English authorities throughout the 1570s.

Finally, cultural and religious conflict also played a role in fomenting discontent. In the early 1570s, Sir John Perrot, the English Lord Deputy, had banned aspects of traditional Gaelic Irish culture, including Brehon law, bardic Irish language poetry, and Irish dress. In addition, the English had introduced Protestantism as the state religion in Ireland, whereas the majority of the population were Roman Catholic. This was an increasingly important proof of loyalty to the Dublin administration after the promulgation of Pope Pius V's papal bull Regnans in Excelsis in 1570, when the Papacy excommunicated Elizabeth and her officials. Fitzmaurice appealed to both of these sentiments, speaking only Irish, wearing Irish dress, and also championing the cause of the Counter-Reformation.

=== Aborted invasion of 1578 ===
In exile in Europe from 1575, Fitzmaurice tried to get backing for a new rebellion. He intrigued at the French and Spanish courts for a foreign invasion of Ireland. However, the Habsburg King Philip II of Spain showed no interest in supporting him, as he was already overstretched fighting the Dutch Revolt in the Netherlands. Fitzmaurice had more success though at the court of Pope Gregory XIII, where he met with exiled English Roman Catholic priests such as William Allen and Nicholas Sanders who were seeking to invade England, depose Elizabeth, and restore a Catholic monarchy.

With the English adventurer Captain Thomas Stukley, Fitzmaurice planned an expedition which was to make Giacomo Boncompagni, the nephew of Pope Gregory, King of Ireland. This was supported by the English Catholics.

Stukley was provided by the Pope with infantry and sailed from Civitavecchia in Rome with 1,000 men in March 1578, including pardoned highwaymen, musketeers, and some professional officers, including Hercules of Pisano and Sebastiano di San Giuseppe of Bologna. In Cádiz in Spain he added some Irishmen and King Philip II sent him to Lisbon to secure better ships and meet with Fitzmaurice. Having no ships to offer, King Sebastian of Portugal instead invited Stukley to join an invasion of Morocco, Stukley was killed there in August 1578 at the Battle of Alcácer Quibir, thus ending Fitzmaurice's initial plans for invading Ireland.

=== 1579 invasion ===
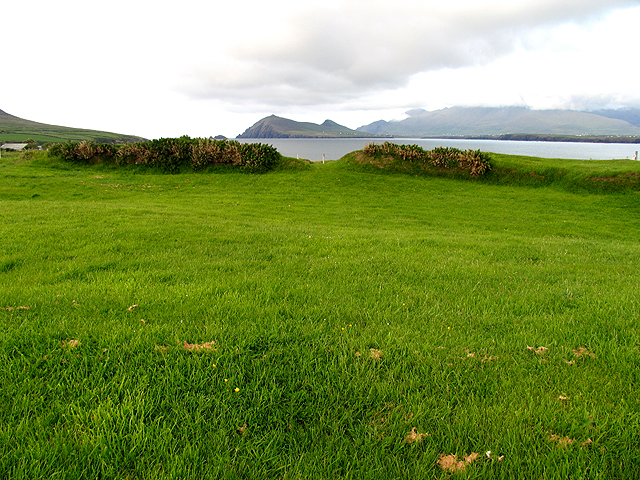
Dún an Óir

Nicholas Sanders, Fitzmaurice, and others returned to Rome and formed a new expedition with Papal authority. With a small force of Irish, Spanish, and Italian troops, they set sail for Ireland in early June 1579 from Corunna in Galicia, Spain. The fleet consisted of Fitzmaurice's own vessel and three Spanish shallops. Fitzmaurice was joined by Matthew de Oviedo and by Nicholas Sanders as Papal commissary.

En route in the English Channel, they captured two English vessels and arrived at Dingle harbour (part of the area now known as County Kerry) on 16 July. On the 18th they cast anchor in the nearby small Smerwick harbour (now known as Ard na Caithne), where they established a defensive garrison at Dún an Óir (Fort of Gold, Spanish: Fuerte del Oro), an Iron Age promontory fort nearby. Nicholas Sanders paraded the Papal banner with some ceremony at Dingle and Fitzmaurice proclaimed a holy war sanctioned by letters from Pope Gregory. This was a very serious matter in 16th century thinking, as it released the Catholic subjects of Elizabeth I from their duty of obedience to her, on the grounds that she was a heretic (the Pope had excommunicated her in 1570). The fact that Fitzmaurice had openly challenged the legitimacy of the Tudor dynasty to rule Ireland meant that, unlike the first Desmond rebellion of 1569–1573, this one would be very unlikely to end with a negotiated peace.

The rebels were joined on 25 July by two galleys with 100 more Spanish troops.

=== Rebellion begins ===
Fitzmaurice's small force might well have been crushed rapidly had he not been joined on 1 August by John of Desmond. John Fitzedmund Fitzgerald, like Fitzmaurice, had been a soldier and had a large following among his kinsmen and the disaffected and unemployed soldiers of Munster. It was only after John's joining of the rebellion that it was joined by these soldiers in large numbers. John and his brother, James Fitzedmund Fitzgerald, the Seneschal of Imokilly, marked their entry into the rebellion by assassinating two English officials, Henry Davells and Arthur Carter in a tavern in Tralee.

John of Desmond and Fitzmaurice together commanded a force of over 3,000 men, including a small number of European soldiers, and several thousand native Irish troops. The prospect of further continental reinforcements was hampered though, when Sir William Winter, on 29 July 1579, four days after the landing at Smerwick, seized the ships of the invasion force and cut off their sea-routes.

The Earl of Desmond, who was reasonably satisfied with the English settlement of the first rebellion, initially tried to stay out of Fitzmaurice's rebellion and attempted to raise the Geraldines to put it down. However, he managed to assemble only 60 men – in contrast to the thousands raised at short notice by his brother John, indicating that most of the FitzGeralds and their allies sympathised with the rebellion.

A number of the invasion force went to other parts of Ireland. A small number went to Carrigafoyle Castle on the southern banks of the River Shannon (in northern County Kerry), the seat of the Earl of Desmond. This contingent included an Italian engineer, Captain Julian, who set about perfecting the castle's defences.

Fitzmaurice himself mounted a sortie to Connacht to try to provoke rebellion there. However, he was killed in a skirmish with the forces of the Burkes of Clanwilliam on 18 August, after his men stole some horses belonging to Theobald Burke (a cousin of Fitzmaurice). This left the rebellion under the command of John of Desmond, now effectively the leader of the Geraldines.

The rebels were left in control of southern Munster and the English did not have enough troops to re-take it. Drury, the English Lord Deputy, marched 600 men to Limerick, where he was joined by Nicholas Malby, with a force of 1,100 English soldiers. Drury was in poor health and died shortly afterwards. He left the Crown forces under the command of Malby.

=== Gerald the Earl joins the rebellion ===
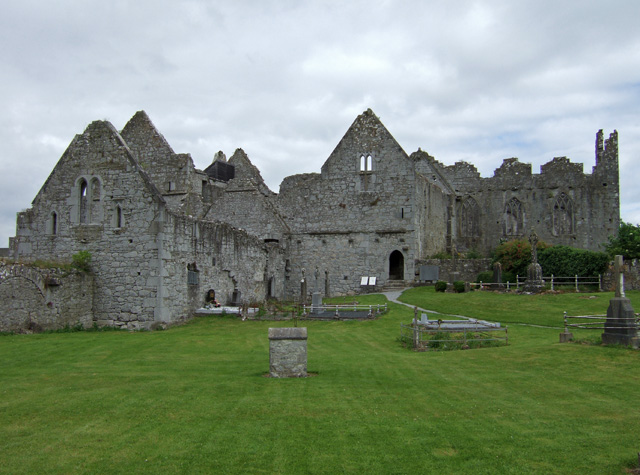
The Askeaton Friary was burned during Malby's attack

In late October, Malby marched through the Desmond territory, devastating the countryside there and demanded that Gerald the Earl of Desmond surrender his castle at Askeaton. Desmond refused and resisted when Malby tried to take the castle by force. William Pelham, the Lord Justice of Ireland, then proclaimed Desmond a traitor, meaning that he was to be captured and executed. This forced Gerald and the remaining FitzGeralds to join the rebellion.

The Earl assumed leadership of the rebellion in a spectacular manner. On 13 November 1579, he and his followers sacked the town of Youghal, massacring its English garrison, hanging the English officials there, looting the town, and abusing the civilian population. Desmond's force then blockaded the city of Cork before withdrawing westwards into the mountains of Kerry. MacCarthy Mor, meanwhile, chief of the MacCarthys, announced his joining of the rebellion by sacking Kinsale.

=== Spring 1580 campaign ===
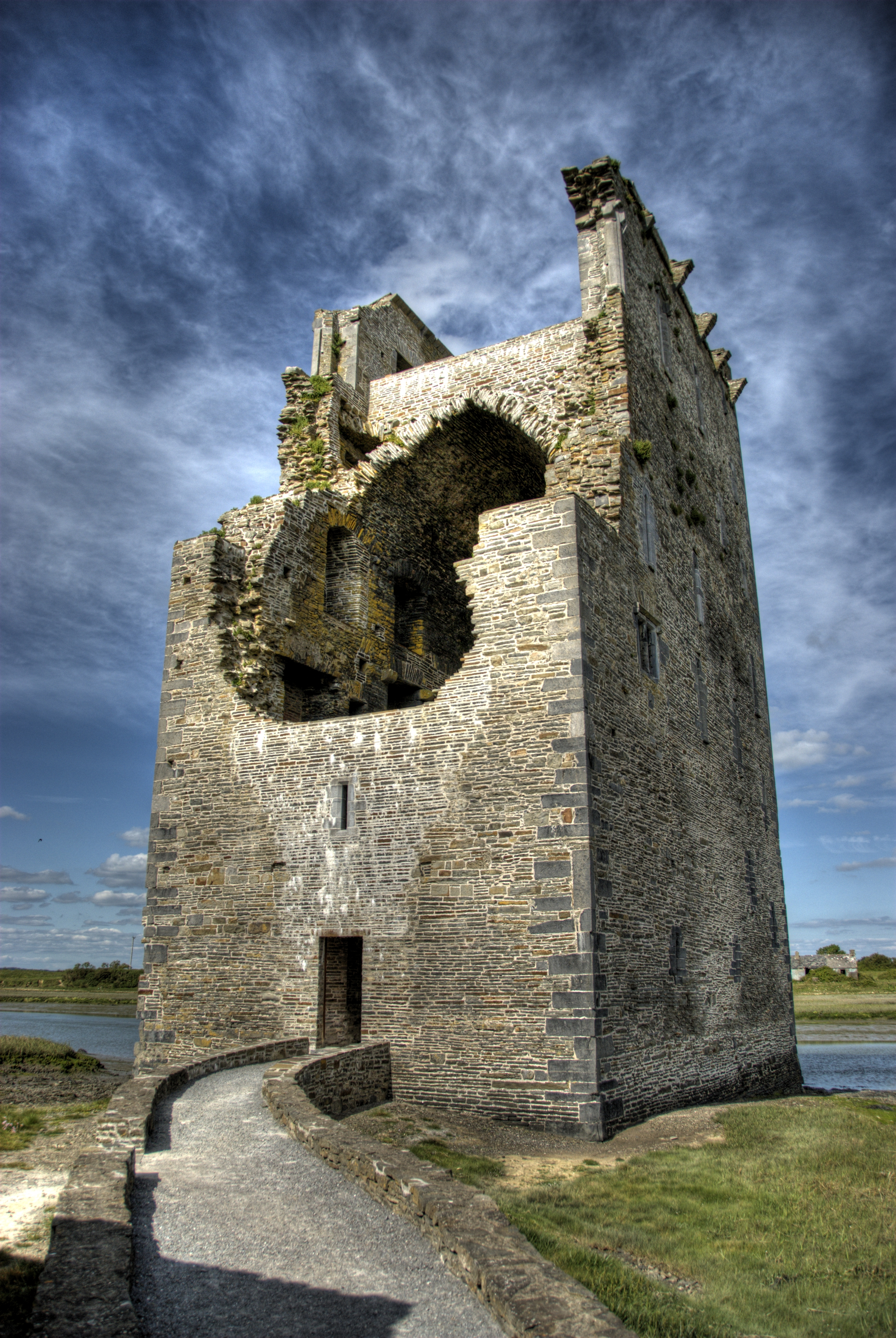
Carrigafoyle Castle

The ferocity of Desmond's actions were repaid in kind by the Crown forces early in the following year. Thomas Butler, 3rd Earl of Ormonde, Sir William Pelham, and Sir George Carew were sent to Munster to subdue the rebels and proceeded to systematically destroy the Desmond lands in County Limerick, County Cork, and north County Kerry and to kill the civilians who lived there at random. These tactics were intended to cause so much economic and human damage to the Desmonds' followers that they would be forced to leave the rebellion. The Crown troops were not only English but also composed of Irish forces antagonistic to the Geraldines, notably, apart from Ormonde's followers, the over 1,000 fighting men of the MacCarthy Reaghs of Carbery, and also the O'Driscolls. Hugh O'Neill, 3rd Earl of Tyrone, also led a contingent from his lands in Ulster.

In March 1580, the Crown forces had an important strategic victory, taking the Desmond stronghold at Carrigafoyle Castle at the mouth of the Shannon. With 1,400 soldiers and assisted by William Winter and his naval forces, William Pelham captured Carrigafoyle, the principal Desmond stronghold at the mouth of the River Shannon and massacred the rebel garrison there. They had now cut off the Geraldine forces from the north of the country and prevented a landing of foreign troops into the main Munster port of Limerick. When news of the destruction of Carrigafoyle castle spread, other Desmond strongholds fell swiftly. The castle at Askeaton was abandoned with its Spanish defenders blowing up the walls, and the garrisons at Newcastle West, Balliloghan, Rathkeale, and Ballyduff surrendered soon afterwards. Many of the lords who had joined the rebellion surrendered as well, judging the English to have the upper hand. Those who surrendered included MacCarthy Mor, Roche, Barry, and others.

It looked as if the rebellion was beaten by the summer of 1580, but it was revived by the outbreak of new rebellion in the eastern province of Leinster.

=== Rebellion in Leinster ===
In July 1580, Fiach McHugh O'Byrne, based in the Wicklow Mountains launched the rebellion in the east of Ireland. He assembled a coalition of local lords and clan leaders, including the Kavanaghs, the O'Tooles, and the O'Moores. Many of these had already been fighting on and off with English garrisons for several years. In particular, the arbitrary killings by an English officer named Masterson, based in Wicklow, seems to have provoked many into revolt. In a symbolic rejection of English rule, the rebels bestowed the title of King of Leinster on Creon MacMurrough Kavanagh, whose ancestors had held this title before the English conquest. O'Byrne was joined by James Eustace, 3rd Viscount Baltinglass, an Old English marcher lord of the Pale, who was motivated primarily by his devout Catholicism.

In August, John of Desmond and Nicholas Sanders met Baltinglass in Laois to try to co-ordinate their forces, but aside from limited co-operation in the Barrow valley region, they were unable to forge a common strategy. Nevertheless, the outbreak of rebellion so close to the centre of English government in Dublin was of grave concern to the English.

Sir Henry Sidney, the former Lord Deputy of Ireland, influenced the response from his membership of the Privy council and in August 1580 a new Lord Deputy, Arthur Grey, 14th Baron Grey de Wilton, was sent from England with 6,000 troops. Grey's immediate priority was to put down the Leinster rebellion.

On 25 August 1580, English forces under Grey were routed in the Battle of Glenmalure with the forces of O'Byrne and Viscount Baltinglass. While trying to storm O'Byrne's fortress at Glenmalure in the heart of the Wicklow mountains, they were ambushed and mauled, losing over 800 men killed. William Stanley was sent by Grey de Wilton to defend the Pale area of Leinster. For the remainder of the war, O'Byrne and his allies raided English settlements in the east and south east, but were unable to take strategic advantage of their victory at Glenmalure.

The rebellion and its aftermath saw a number of people from the Pale and other Old English areas such as Wexford (who had previously always been loyal to English authority) hanged as traitors. Those executed included Dermot O'Hurley the Catholic Archbishop of Cashel and Margaret Ball the wife of the Lord Mayor of Dublin, also died in prison in Dublin Castle. Those executed often proclaimed their Catholic faith on the scaffold and were honoured by their Church as Catholic martyrs . These executions were a major factor in the long term alienation of the Old English from the English state in Ireland.

=== 1580 Spanish and Papal landing ===
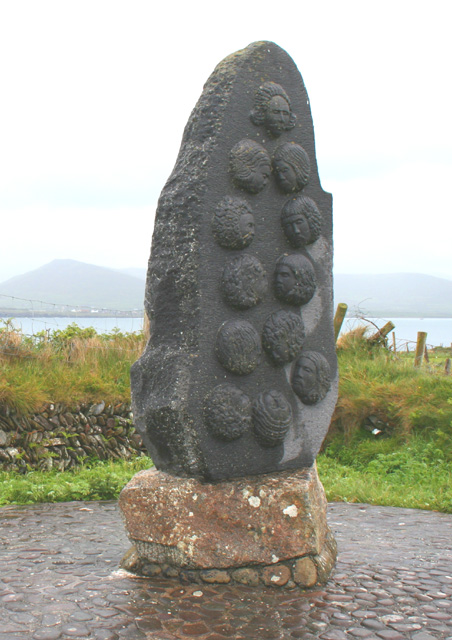
Monument erected in 1980 at Dún an Óir to the mercenaries executed after the Siege of Smerwick, October 1580

On 10 September 1580, a squadron of Spanish ships under the command of Don Juan Martinez de Recalde landed a Papal force of Spanish and Italians numbering 600 men commanded by Sebastiano di San Giuseppe (aka Sebastiano da Modena; Sebastian de San José), at Smerwick, on the Dingle Peninsula near the same point where Fitzmaurice had landed the previous year. They had arms for several thousand men, sent by Philip II to aid the rebellion, and paid for by Pope Gregory. Desmond, Baltinglass, and John of Desmond made an effort to link up with the expeditionary force but English forces under Ormonde and Grey blocked them and prompt naval action by Richard Bingham blockaded the Papal force's ships into the bay at Smerwick. San Giuseppe had no choice but to fortify his men in the fort at Dún an Óir.

In October 1580, Grey de Wilton with up to 4,000 troops arrived at Smerwick and laid siege to the garrison. The invasion forces were geographically isolated on the tip of the narrow Dingle Peninsula, cut off by Mount Brandon on one side and the much larger English force on the other. They had no means of escape. In addition, the English had brought up heavy artillery by sea, which rapidly broke down the improvised defences of Dún an Óir.

After a three-day siege, Colonel Di san Giuseppe surrendered on 10 October 1580, on agreeing to take a bribe as his reward. Local historian Margaret Anna Cusack (1868) explained that: "In a few days the courage of the Spanish commander failed, and he entered into treaty with the Lord Deputy. A bargain was made that he should receive a large share of the spoils... The English were admitted to the fortress on the following day, and a feast was prepared for them." Grey de Wilton ordered the massacre and the Italian and Spanish mercenaries were beheaded and their bodies thrown into the sea.

Among the English soldiers present at the siege and massacre was the writer and explorer Walter Raleigh. This was brought against him as a criminal charge in one of his trials. Raleigh argued that he was "obliged to obey the commands of his superior officer" but he was unable to exonerate himself.

=== End of the rebellion ===
With the massacre at Smerwick, the tide had turned decisively against the rebels. However, the war dragged on for two more years of increasingly bitter guerrilla fighting. The civilian population was to suffer tremendously as a result of the war, being targeted by both sides and having their crops, livestock, and homes destroyed.

In the summer of 1582, English authorities became concerned about overspending in Ireland, and Grey returned to England. By mid 1582, Warham St Leger reported that around 30,000 people had died of famine in Munster alone in the previous six months and hundreds were dying in Cork city of starvation and disease.

Meanwhile, the rebellion slowly fell apart. As a result of the defeat at Smerwick, Papal assistance to Nicholas Sanders was cut off. After spending almost two years as a fugitive in the south-west of Ireland, he is believed to have died of cold and starvation in the spring of 1581. In April 1581, a general pardon was offered to all but the rebellion's leaders. Many of the Earl of Desmond's erstwhile supporters surrendered. Baltinglass fled for France in August 1581. Fiach MacHugh O'Byrne made a false surrender in April 1581 but continued his raiding after a short period. However he finally surrendered in September 1582, ending the fighting in Leinster.

For the Earl of Desmond, there would be no pardon, and he was pursued by Crown forces until the end. For the remainder of the war, the Earl and the remaining Geraldines evaded capture on the run in the mountains of Kerry and Tipperary and engaged in guerrilla warfare. In early 1582, John of Desmond was killed in a skirmish north of Cork. The rebellion was finally ended in 1583, when the Earl of Ormonde assumed command of Crown forces. Ormonde took a less ruthless approach to the campaign than previous officers, preferring diplomacy to scorched-earth tactics. He contained the rebels to west Cork and Kerry and persuaded many of Desmond's closest relatives to surrender. On 11 November 1583 the end came when the Earl was killed in Glenaginty in the Slieve Mish Mountains (near Tralee in County Kerry) by the local Moriarty clan of Castledrum on the Dingle peninsula. The Earl and his followers had raided the property of clan Moriarty, stole cattle and mistreated the sister of the clan chief, Owen Moriarty. Men of clan Moriarty, with 25 soldiers, pursued the Earl's followers until they captured and killed the Earl at Glenaginty. Owen Moriarty received 1,000 pounds of silver from the English government for Desmond's head, which was sent to Queen Elizabeth in London, while his body was triumphantly displayed on the walls of Cork city.

== Aftermath ==
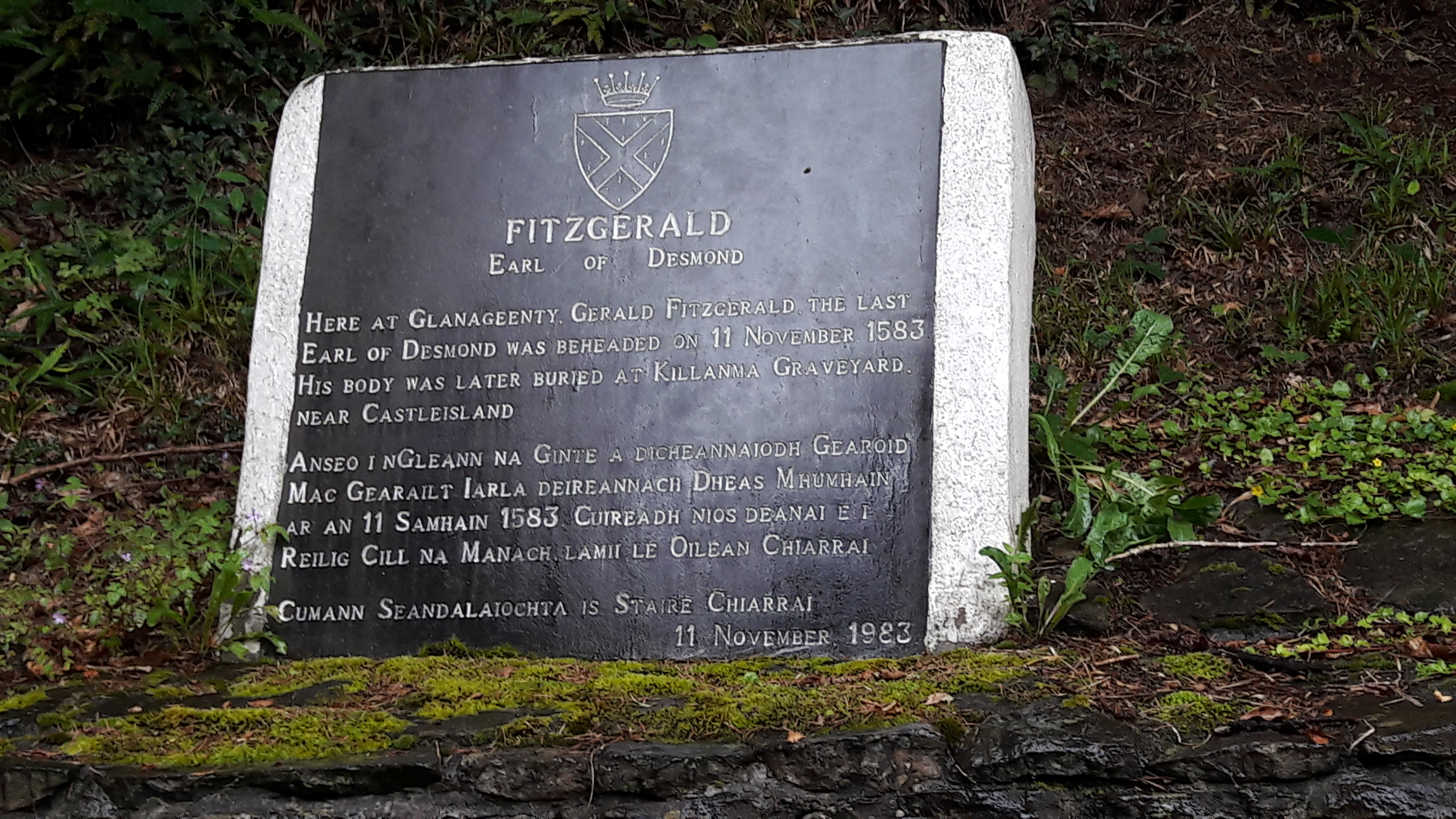
Monument marking the site of FitzGerald's capture in Glanageenty forest, County Kerry.

Munster continued to suffer from Bubonic plague and famine in the years following the rebellion, and was described as having vast empty areas and a substantially reduced population. Perhaps as much as one third of the province's population perished in the war.

The main political consequence of the rebellion was the annihilation of the Desmond dynasty's power in southern Ireland. Their lands were confiscated, along with those of their allies. Following a survey in 1584 by the Surveyor General of Ireland, Sir Valentine Browne it was subsequently colonised with English settlers – the Munster Plantations. The Earl of Desmond title was later restored and during another rebellion, the Nine Years War in the 1590s, the English attempted to introduce a new Protestant Geraldine Earl who had grown up in England, but without success.

In Leinster, Fiach MacHugh O'Byrne submitted but was later killed leading a new rebellion in Nine Years War. James Eustace, 3rd Viscount of Baltinglass went into exile, dying in Spain in 1585. His title and property, including Rathfarnham Castle were confiscated.

Many more former rebels were pardoned but had some land confiscated and had to pay substantial fines.

The destruction of so many important landed families in Ireland and colonisation of their lands with English settlers meant that the Second Desmond Rebellion was one of the most important events in the Tudor conquest of Ireland – a century long process which saw all of Ireland under English control by 1603. The killing of many of the Irish mercenary class in the war was likewise an important development for the English authorities in establishing their monopoly on the use of force in Ireland. The Rebellion also established the theme of religious conflict in Irish history for the first time. The divide between Irish Catholic landowners and Protestant English settlers and government would dominate Irish life for another century and still has reverberations to this day.

== Notable participants ==
Invasion/Rebellion side – the Irish and their Catholic supporters:

- James Fitzmaurice FitzGerald, cousin of the Earl of Desmond, organiser of the rebellions
- Gerald FitzGerald, 14th Earl of Desmond
- Pope Gregory XIII, provided funds and forces
- Captain Thomas Stukley, English adventurer, leader of first proposed invasion force
- Giacomo Boncompagni, the illegitimate son of Pope Gregory proposed as King of Ireland
- William Allen, English priest in Rome who supported the rebellion
- Nicholas Sanders, English priest and Papal legate on the invasion force
- Philip II of Spain, provided forces
- King Sebastian of Portugal, diverted Thomas Stuckly and the first force to Morocco, where both were killed
- Earl of Kildare, Geraldine leader, requested to join the rebellion
- James Fitzedmund FitzGerald, Seneschal of Imokilly, succeeded as leader of the rebellion
- Juan Martínez de Recalde, Spanish member of the invasion force who returned later in the Spanish Armada
- Fiach MacHugh O'Byrne, Irish chieftain who rebelled in Leinster, Battle of Glenmalure
- James Eustace, 3rd Viscount Baltinglass of the Pale who joined the rebellion in Leinster, Battle of Glenmalure
- Creon MacMurrough Kavanagh, appointed King of Leinster by the rebellion

Kingdom of Ireland:

- Elizabeth I of England
- Owen Moriarty, Chieftain of the Moriarty clan of Castledrum in Kerry, killed the Earl of Desmond in 1583
- Sir Henry Sidney, the former Lord Deputy of Ireland member of the Privy Council of Ireland
- Sir William Winter, Welsh naval commander
- Sir George Carew, Irish Royal Army commander
- Arthur Grey, 14th Baron Grey de Wilton, Lord Deputy of Ireland
- William Stanley, army commander
- Richard Bingham, member of the English army
- Sir Walter Raleigh, member of the English army
- Edmund Spenser, member of the English army
- Thomas Butler, 3rd Earl of Ormonde, supporter of the English forces
- Hugh O'Neill, 3rd Earl of Tyrone, supporter of the English forces
- Owen MacCarthy Reagh, 16th Prince of Carbery, supporter of the English forces

== See also ==
- List of Irish rebellions
- Rising of the North
- Other events of the Tudor conquest of Ireland
  - Nine Years War (1594–1603)
