= Desmond Rebellions =

Two rebellions by the FitzGerald dynasty in Ireland, late 16th century

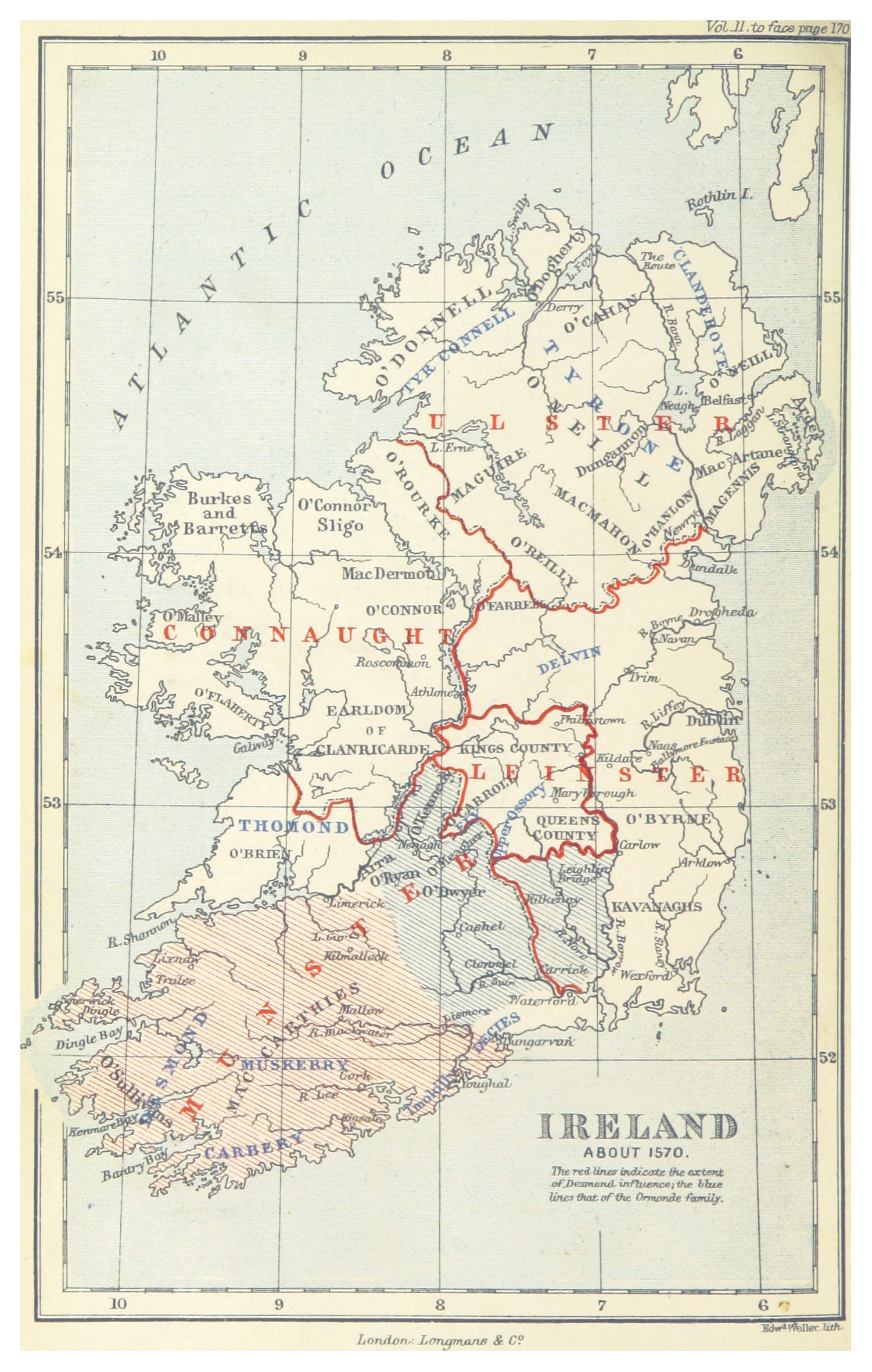
Map of Ireland c. 1570. The Desmonds ruled the southwest corner of the island.

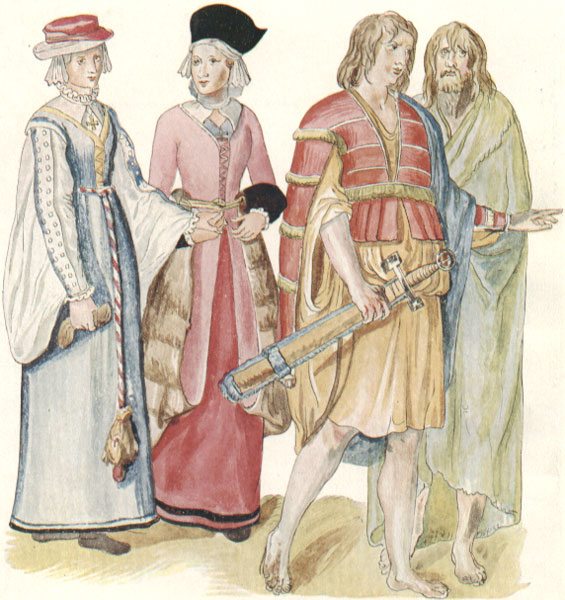
Clothing of Irish women and men. c. 1575.

The Desmond Rebellions occurred in 1569–1573 and 1579–1583 in the Irish province of Munster. They were rebellions by the Earl of Desmond, the head of the FitzGerald dynasty in Munster, and his followers, the Geraldines and their allies, against the threat of the extension of the English government over the province. The rebellions were motivated primarily by the desire to maintain the independence of feudal lords from the English monarch but also had an element of religious antagonism between Catholic Geraldines and the Protestant English state. They culminated in the destruction of the Desmond dynasty and the plantation or colonisation of Munster with English Protestant settlers. 'Desmond' is the Anglicisation of the Irish Deasmumhain, meaning 'South Munster'.

In addition to the scorched earth policy, Sir Humphrey Gilbert, Warham St Leger, Perrot and later Nicholas Malby and Lord Grey and William Pelham, deliberately targeted civilians, including women and children, the elderly or infirm or even those of diminished mental capacity, regardless of whether they supported the Desmonds or not. It was considered a good policy to terrorise the native population. The American author Richard Berleth covers it in great detail in his book The Twilight Lords.

== Causes ==
The southeast of Ireland (in the provinces of Munster and southern Leinster) was dominated, as it had been for over two centuries, by the Norman Irish Butlers of Ormonde and the Fitzmaurices and FitzGeralds of Desmond and the Southwest of Munster was still under the native Eóganachta dynasty under the O’Sullivans, McCarthys, and O’Keefes who defeated the Normans of the Butlers and Barry’s at the Battle of Callann in 1261. The Butlers, Fitzmaurices and FitzGeralds of Desmond raised their own armed forces and imposed their own law, a mixture of Irish and English customs independent of what the English government imposed on Ireland. Beginning in the 1530s, successive English administrations tried to expand English control over Ireland (See Tudor conquest of Ireland). By the 1560s, their attention had turned to the south of Ireland and Henry Sidney, as Lord Deputy of Ireland, was charged with establishing the authority of the English government over the independent lordships there. His solution was the creation of "lord presidencies", provincial military governors who were to replace the local lords as military powers and keepers of the peace.

The dynasties saw the presidencies as intrusions into their sphere of influence. Their interfamilial competition had seen the Butlers and FitzGeralds fight a pitched battle against each other at Affane in County Waterford in 1565 in defiance of English law. Elizabeth I summoned the heads of both houses to London to explain their actions. However, the treatment of the dynasties was not even-handed. Thomas Butler, 10th Earl of Ormonde, "Black Tom" Butler, Queen Elizabeth's cousin and friend, was pardoned, but both Gerald FitzGerald, 14th Earl of Desmond (in 1567) and his brother, John of Desmond, who was widely regarded as the real military leader of the FitzGeralds (in 1568), were arrested and detained in the Tower of London on Ormonde's urging.

That decapitated the natural leadership of the Munster Geraldines and left the Desmond earldom in the hands of a soldier, James FitzMaurice, the captain general of the Desmond military. FitzMaurice had little stake in a new demilitarised order in Munster, with abolition of the Irish lords' armies. A factor that drew wider support for FitzMaurice was the prospect of land confiscations, which had been mooted by Sidney and Peter Carew, an English claimant to lands granted to an ancestor just after the Anglo-Norman invasion of Ireland that had been lost soon afterwards.

FitzMaurice was thus the support of important Munster clans, notably O'Sullivan Mór, MacCarthy Mór, and O'Keefe, and two prominent Butlers, brothers of the Earl. FitzMaurice himself had lost the land he had held at Kerricurrihy in County Cork, which had been taken and leased to English colonists. He was a devout Catholic who was influenced by the Counter-Reformation and saw the Protestant Elizabethan governors as his enemies.

To discourage Sidney from going ahead with the Lord Presidency for Munster and to re-establish Desmond primacy over the Butlers, FitzMaurice planned rebellion against the English presence in the south and against the Earl of Ormonde. FitzMaurice had wider aims than simply the recovery of FitzGerald supremacy within the context of the English Kingdom of Ireland. Before the rebellion, he had secretly sent Maurice MacGibbon, Catholic Archbishop of Cashel, to seek military aid from Philip II of Spain.

== First Desmond Rebellion ==
First Desmond Rebellion
- Part of the Desmond Rebellions
Date	June 1569 – 23 February 1573
Location	Province of Munster, Ireland
Result	English victory Second Desmond Rebellion

Belligerents
FitzGerald of Desmond; MacCarthy of Desmond and other allied clans	Kingdom of England: (Kingdom of Ireland) Anglo-Irish loyalists

Commanders and leaders
James FitzMaurice FitzGerald; Donald MacCarthy	Henry Sidney; Thomas Butler; Humphrey Gilbert; John Perrot

Strength
4,500	Unknown

Casualties and losses
Unknown 700 executed	Unknown

FitzMaurice first attacked the English colony at Kerrycurihy south of Cork city in June 1569, before attacking Cork itself and those native lords who refused to join the rebellion. FitzMaurice's force of 4,500 men went on to besiege Kilkenny, seat of the Earls of Ormonde, in July. In response, Sidney mobilised 600 English troops, who marched south from Dublin and another 400 landed by sea in Cork. Thomas Butler, Earl of Ormonde, returned from London, where he had been at court, and mobilised the Butlers and some Gaelic Irish clans antagonistic to the Geraldines. After the failed attempt to take Kilkenny, the rebellion quickly descended into an untidy mopping-up operation.

Together, Ormonde, Sidney, and Humphrey Gilbert, appointed as governor of Munster, devastated the lands of FitzMaurice's allies in a scorched earth policy. FitzMaurice's forces broke up, as individual lords had to retire to defend their own territories. Gilbert, a half-brother of Sir Walter Raleigh, was the most notorious for terror tactics, killing civilians at random and setting up corridors of severed heads at the entrance to his camps.

Sidney forced FitzMaurice into the mountains of County Kerry, from where he launched guerrilla attacks on the English and their allies. By 1570, most of FitzMaurice's allies had submitted to Sidney. The most important, Donal MacCarthy Mór, surrendered in November 1569. Nevertheless, the guerrilla campaign continued for three more years. In February 1571, John Perrot was made Lord President of Munster. He pursued FitzMaurice with 700 troops for over a year without success. FitzMaurice had some victories, capturing an English ship near Kinsale and burning the town of Kilmallock in 1571, but by early 1573, his force was reduced to less than 100 men. FitzMaurice finally submitted on 23 February 1573, having negotiated a pardon for his life. However, in 1574, he became landless, and in 1575, he sailed to France to seek help from the Catholic powers to start another rebellion.

Gerald FitzGerald; Earl of Desmond; and his brother, John, were released from prison to reconstruct their shattered territory. Under a settlement imposed after the rebellion, known as "composition", the Desmonds' military forces were limited by law to 20 horsemen, and their tenants were made to pay rent to them, rather than supply military service or quarter their soldiers. Perhaps the biggest winner of the first Desmond Rebellion was the Earl of Ormonde, who established himself as the most powerful lord in the south of Ireland because he had sided with the English crown.

All of the local chiefs had submitted by the end of the rebellion. The methods used to suppress it provoked lingering resentment, especially among the Irish mercenaries; gall óglaigh or gallowglass as the English termed them, who had rallied to FitzMaurice. William Drury, Lord President of Munster from 1576, executed around 700 of these men in the years after the rebellion.

In the aftermath of the uprising, Gaelic customs such as Brehon Laws, Irish dress, bardic poetry, and the maintaining of "private armies", all of which were deeply valued in traditional Irish society, were again outlawed and suppressed. FitzMaurice had emphasised the Gaelic character of the rebellion, wearing Irish dress, speaking only Irish and referring to himself as the taoiseach of the Geraldines. Irish landowners continued to be threatened by the arrival of English colonists to settle on land confiscated from the Irish. All of those factors meant that when FitzMaurice returned from Europe to start a new rebellion, many people in Munster were willing to join him.

In late 1569, the Catholic Northern Rebellion broke out in England, but was crushed. This and the Desmond Rebellion caused Pope Pius V to issue Regnans in Excelsis, a bull excommunicating Elizabeth and depriving her of the allegiance of her Catholic subjects. Elizabeth had previously accepted private Catholic worship but now suppressed militant Catholicism. Luckily for her, most of her Irish subjects did not want to get involved in rebellions although they mostly remained Catholic.

== Second Desmond Rebellion ==
The second Desmond rebellion was sparked when James FitzMaurice launched an invasion of Munster in 1579. During his exile in Europe, he had declared himself as a soldier of the Counter-Reformation by arguing that since the Pope's excommunication of Elizabeth I, Irish Catholics did not owe loyalty to a heretic monarch. The Pope granted FitzMaurice an indulgence and supplied him with troops and money. FitzMaurice landed at Smerwick, near Dingle (modern County Kerry) on 18 July 1579 with a small force of Spanish and Italian troops. He was joined on 1 August by John of Desmond, a brother of the earl, who had a large following among his kinsmen and the disaffected swordsmen of Munster. Other Gaelic clans and Old English families also joined in the rebellion.

FitzMaurice was killed in a skirmish with the Clanwilliam Burkes on 18 August, and John FitzGerald assumed leadership of the rebellion.

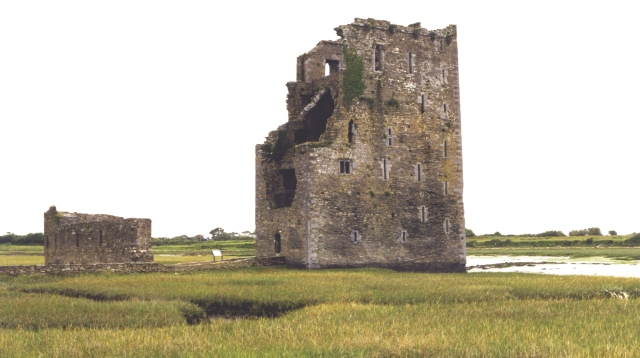
Carrigafoyle Castle

Gerald, the Earl of Desmond, initially resisted the call of the rebels and tried to remain neutral but gave in once the authorities had proclaimed him a traitor. He joined the rebellion by sacking Youghal (on 13 November) and Kinsale, and devastated the country of the English and their allies.

In the summer of 1580, English troops under William Pelham and locally raised Irish forces under the Earl of Ormonde retook the south coast, destroyed the lands of the Desmonds and their allies and killed their tenants. They captured Carrigafoyle, the principal Desmond castle at the mouth of the Shannon on Easter 1580, cutting off the Geraldine forces from the rest of the country and prevented a landing of foreign troops into the main Munster ports.

In July 1580, the rising spread to Leinster under the leadership of Fiach MacHugh O'Byrne and his client the Pale lord James Eustace, 3rd Viscount Baltinglass. They ambushed and massacred a large English force under the Lord Deputy of Ireland Lord Grey de Wilton at the battle of Glenmalure on 25 August.

On 10 September 1580, 600 papal troops landed at Smerwick in Kerry to support the rebellion. They were besieged in a fort at Dún an Óir. They surrendered after two days of bombardment and were then massacred. Through the relentless scorched-earth tactics of the English, who killed animals and razed crops and homes to deprive the Irish of any food or shelter, the rebellion was crushed by mid-1581. By May 1581, most of the minor rebels and FitzGerald allies in Munster and Leinster had accepted Elizabeth I's offer of a general pardon. John of Desmond was killed north of Cork in early 1582.

The Geraldine earl was pursued by English forces until the end. From 1581 to 1583, his supporters evaded capture in the mountains of Kerry. On 2 November 1583 the earl was hunted down and killed near Tralee in Kerry by the O'Moriarty family and English soldiers from Castle Maine. The clan chief, Maurice, received 1,000 pounds of silver and a pension of 20 pounds a year from the English government for Desmond's head, which was sent to Queen Elizabeth. Desmond's body was displayed on the walls of Cork. (Maurice O'Moriarty ended his life by being hanged at Tyburn.)

== Aftermath ==
After three years of scorched earth warfare by the English, Munster was racked by famine. In April 1582, the provost marshal of Munster, Sir Warham St Leger, estimated that 30,000 people had died of hunger in the previous six months. Plague broke out in Cork City to where the country people had fled to avoid the fighting. People continued to die of starvation and plague long after the war had ended, and it is estimated that by 1589, one third of the province's population had died. Grey was recalled by Elizabeth I for his excessive brutality. Two famous accounts tell us of the devastation of Munster after the Desmond rebellion. The first is from the Gaelic Annals of the Four Masters:

... the whole tract of country from Waterford to Lothra, and from Cnamhchoill (a wood close to Tipperary) to the county of Kilkenny, was suffered to remain one surface of weeds and waste… At this period it was commonly said that the lowing of a cow or the whistle of the ploughboy could scarcely be heard from Dun-Caoin to Cashel in Munster.

The second is from the View of the Present State of Ireland, written by English poet Edmund Spenser, who fought in the campaign, approved the scorched earth method, and suggested it as a useful method of enforcing English ways:

In those late wars in Munster; for notwithstanding that the same was a most rich and plentiful country, full of corn and cattle, that you would have thought they could have been able to stand long, yet ere one year and a half they were brought to such wretchedness, as that any stony heart would have rued the same. Out of every corner of the wood and glens they came creeping forth upon their hands, for their legs could not bear them; they looked Anatomies [of] death, they spoke like ghosts crying out of their graves; they did eat of the carrions, happy where they could find them, yea, and one another soon after, in so much as the very carcasses they spared not to scrape out of their graves; and if they found a plot of water-cresses or shamrocks, there they flocked as to a feast for the time, yet not able long to continue therewithal; that in a short space there were none almost left, and a most populous and plentiful country suddenly left void of man or beast.

The wars of the 1570s and the 1580s marked a watershed in Ireland. The southern Geraldine axis of power was annihilated, and Munster was "planted" with English colonists given land confiscated from those who fought for their country. After a survey begun in 1584 by Sir Valentine Browne, Surveyor General of Ireland, the thousands of English soldiers and administrators who had been imported to suppress the rebellion were given land in the Munster Plantation of Desmond's confiscated estates. The Elizabethan conquest of Ireland followed the subsequent Nine Years' War in Ulster and the extension of plantation policy to other parts of the country.

== See also ==
- History of Ireland (1536–1691)
- List of Irish uprisings
- Tudor conquest of Ireland
