= List of Irish uprisings =

Since the 16th century, there has been a series of uprisings against British rule in Ireland. These uprisings played a major role in the formation of Irish nationalism and republicanism. After the Irish Rebellion of 1798, such uprisings became more revolutionary and republican in nature. Following the Irish War of Independence, the partition of Ireland and the creation of the autonomous Irish Free State in twenty-six of Ireland's thirty-two counties in 1922; with the exception of the Irish Civil War, most but not all subsequent insurgent activity in Ireland occurred within the six counties of Northern Ireland, which continued to be part of the United Kingdom.

| Year(s) | Location(s) | Conflict | Organiser(s) |
|---|---|---|---|
| 1534 | Lordship of Ireland (Dublin) | Silken Thomas Rebellion | FitzGeralds of Kildare |
| 1569–73 | Kingdom of Ireland (Province of Munster) | First Desmond Rebellion | FitzGeralds of Desmond and allied clans |
| 1579–83 | Kingdom of Ireland (Provinces of Munster and Leinster) | Second Desmond Rebellion | FitzGeralds of Desmond and allied clans |
| 1593–1603 | Kingdom of Ireland | Nine Years' War | Hugh Ó Neill, Hugh Ó Donnell and allied clans |
| 1608 | Kingdom of Ireland (County Donegal) | O'Doherty's rebellion | Sir Cahir O'Doherty |
| 1641 | Kingdom of Ireland | Irish Rebellion of 1641 | Phelim Ó Neill, Rory Ó Moore, Conor Maguire, Hugh Óg MacMahon |
| 1642–52 | Kingdom of Ireland | Irish Confederate Wars | Irish Catholic Confederation |
| 1689–91 | Kingdom of Ireland | Williamite War | Jacobites under James II of England |
| 1798 | Kingdom of Ireland | Irish Rebellion of 1798 | Society of United Irishmen |
| 1799–1803 | Kingdom of Ireland, United Kingdom of Great Britain and Ireland (County Wicklow) | Michael Dwyer's guerrilla campaign | Michael Dwyer and his followers (Society of United Irishmen) |
| 1800 | Newfoundland Colony | United Irish Uprising | Society of United Irishmen |
| 1803 | United Kingdom of Great Britain and Ireland (Dublin) | Irish rebellion of 1803 | Society of United Irishmen |
| 1804 | Castle Hill, Colony of New South Wales | Castle Hill Rebellion | Society of United Irishmen |
| 1848 | United Kingdom of Great Britain and Ireland (Ballingarry, South Tipperary) | Young Irelander Rebellion of 1848 | Young Ireland |
| 1866–71 | British North America: Dominion of Canada; Eastern Canada; Manitoba | Fenian Raids | Fenian Brotherhood |
| 1867 | United Kingdom of Great Britain and Ireland, England, and Canada | Fenian Rising | Fenian Brotherhood |
| 1881–85 | United Kingdom of Great Britain and Ireland | Fenian dynamite campaign | Fenian Brotherhood |
| 1882–83 | United Kingdom of Great Britain and Ireland (Dublin) and British Cape Colony (Cape Town) | The Invincibles' Assassinations | Irish National Invincibles |
| 1916 | United Kingdom of Great Britain and Ireland (Counties of Dublin, Meath, Galway, Louth, Wexford, and Cork | Easter Rising | Irish Republican Brotherhood, Irish Citizen Army, Irish Volunteers, Cumann na mBan |
| 1919–22 | Irish Republic | War of Independence | Irish Republican Army (1917–22), Cumann na mBan |
| 1939–40 | England | Sabotage Campaign | Irish Republican Army (1922–1969) |
| 1942–44 | Republic of Ireland-United Kingdom border | Northern Campaign | Irish Republican Army (1922–1969) |
| 1956–62 | Republic of Ireland-United Kingdom border | Border Campaign | Irish Republican Army (1922–1969) |
| 1969–98 | Northern Ireland (mostly), Republic of Ireland and Great Britain | The Troubles | Provisional Irish Republican Army, Irish National Liberation Army, Official Irish Republican Army, Continuity Irish Republican Army, Real Irish Republican Army, Irish Peoples Liberation Organisation |
| 1998–present | Northern Ireland (mostly), Republic of Ireland and Great Britain | Dissident Irish republican campaign 1998–present | Continuity Irish Republican Army, Real Irish Republican Army, Óglaigh na hÉireann, Republican Action Against Drugs, New Irish Republican Army |

== See also ==
=== Ireland ===
- Irish nationalism
- Irish republicanism
- List of conflicts in Ireland
- Military history of Ireland
- United Ireland

=== Other ===
- Welsh rebellions against English rule
- Wars of Scottish Independence
- Scottish independence
- Welsh independence
