= William Pelham (soldier) =

English soldier

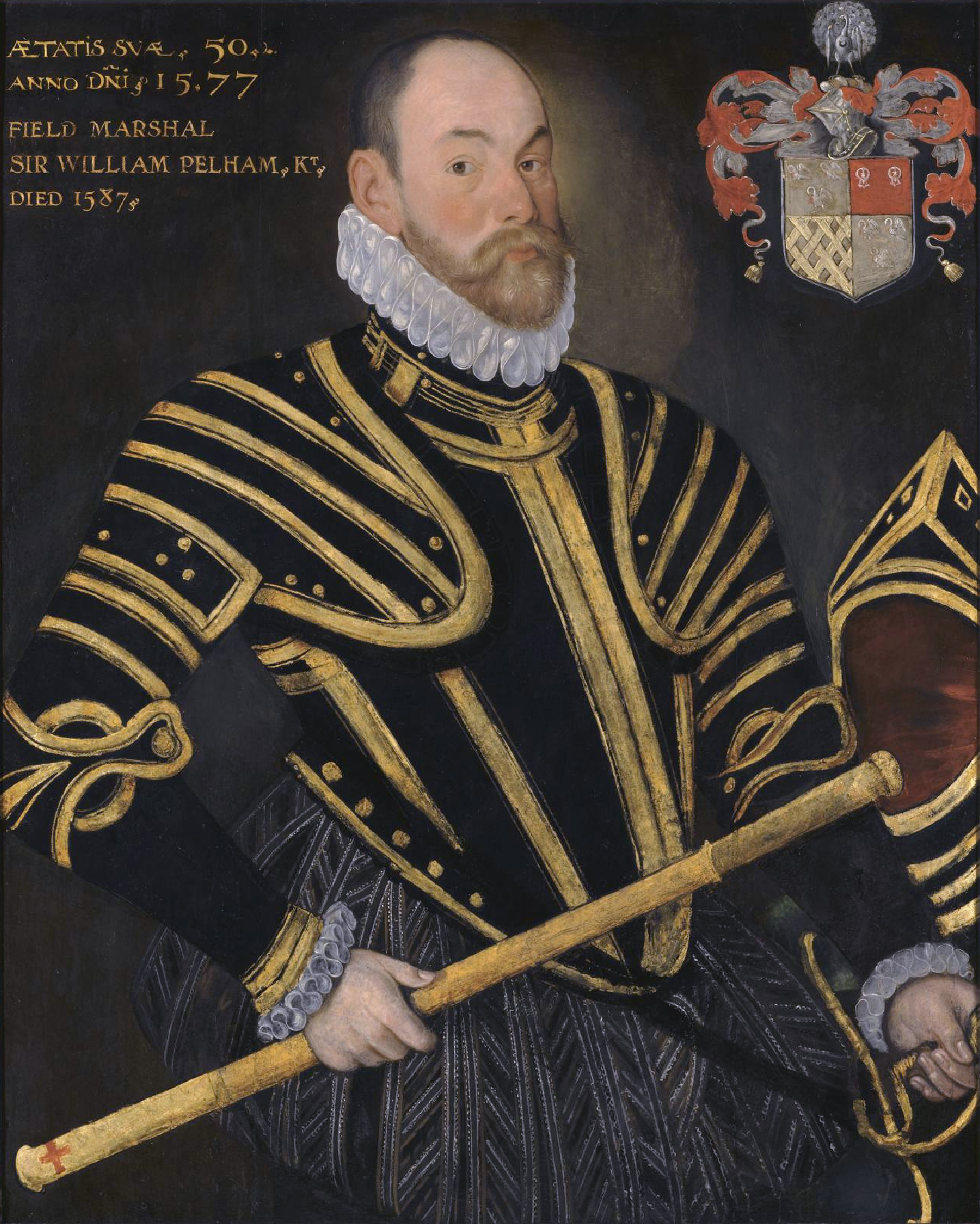
Field Marshal Sir William Pelham, Lord Justice of Ireland (Hieronimo Custodis)

Sir William Pelham (c. 1528 – 1587) was an English soldier and Lord Justice of Ireland, which was a military and political role rather than a judicial one.

== Life ==
He was third son of Sir William Pelham of Laughton, Sussex, by his second wife, Mary, daughter of William Sandys, 1st Baron Sandys of the Vyne near Basingstoke in Hampshire and his wife Margaret Bray. His full brothers included Edmund Pelham, Chief Baron of the Irish Exchequer: their eldest half-brother was Sir Nicholas Pelham (died 1560). His father died in 1538, and Pelham was probably thirty when he was appointed captain of the pioneers at the siege of Leith in 1560. Among the siege works, his pioneers built a sconce with four bastions which was called "Mount Pelham." William was commended on that occasion; but, according to Humfrey Barwick, his bad engineering was responsible for the wound inflicted during the assault on Arthur Grey, 14th Lord Grey de Wilton, the son of the army's commander.

He commanded the pioneers at Le Havre in November 1562 under Ambrose Dudley, 3rd Earl of Warwick; and, despatched to the assistance of Admiral Coligny in February 1563, was present at the capture of Caen. Returning to Le Havre in March, he was wounded during a skirmish with the forces of the Rhinegrave in June. He assisted in the negotiations for the surrender of Le Havre, and was a hostage for the fulfilment of the conditions of surrender. Subsequently, on his return to England, he was employed with Portinari and Jacopo Aconcio in inspecting and improving the fortifications of Berwick upon Tweed. Confidence was reposed in his judgment, and, appointed lieutenant-general of the ordnance, he was chiefly occupied for several years in strengthening the defences of the kingdom. He accompanied Henry Brooke, 11th Baron Cobham, and Secretary Francis Walsingham on a diplomatic mission to the Netherlands in the summer of 1578, and in the following summer he was sent to Ireland to organise the defence of the Pale against possible inroads by the O'Neills. He was knighted by Sir William Drury, and, on the latter's death shortly afterwards, was chosen by the Privy Council of Ireland to be Lord Justice of Ireland ad interim.

=== Career in Ireland ===
The situation of affairs in Munster, recently convulsed by the Second Desmond Rebellion of James Fitzmaurice Fitzgerald, and the menacing attitude of Gerald FitzGerald, 15th Earl of Desmond and his brother Sir John of Desmond, obliged him to go there. His efforts at conciliation proving ineffectual, he caused the earl to be proclaimed a traitor; but, finding himself not sufficiently strong to attack Askeaton, he returned to Dublin by way of Galway, leaving the management of the war in Munster to Thomas Butler, 10th Earl of Ormond. His proceeding gave considerable offence to Queen Elizabeth I, reluctant to involve herself in a new and costly campaign; and Pelham, though pleading in justification Drury's intentions and the necessity of the proclamation, asked to be relieved of his office. Yielding to pressure from England, Pelham in January 1580 prepared to go to Munster himself. At Waterford, where he was detained till about the middle of February for want of victuals, he determined, in consequence of rumours of a Spanish invasion, to entrust the government of the counties of Cork and Waterford to Sir William Morgan, and in conjunction with the Earl of Ormonde to direct his march through Connello and Kerry to Dingle. He carried out his intention ruthlessly, killing indiscriminately according to the Annals of Four Masters. Returning along the sea coast, he sat down before Carrigafoyle Castle on 25 March. Two days later he carried the place by assault, and put the garrison to the sword, sparing no one. Terrified by the fate of Carrigafoyle, the garrison at Askeaton surrendered without a blow, and Desmond's last stronghold of Ballyloughan fell at the same time into Pelham's hands.

With his headquarters at Limerick, the lord justice garrisoned the Desmond district, his object being to confine the struggle to Kerry, and, with the assistance of the fleet, under William Wynter, to starve the rebels into submission. He also summoned a meeting of the noblemen and chief gentry of the province, but the attendance was meagre. He and Ormonde then entered Kerry together. From Castleisland, where they narrowly missed capturing the Earl of Desmond and Nicholas Sanders, they advanced along the valley of the River Maine, scouring the country as they went, to Dingle. At Dingle they found Admiral Winter, and, with his assistance, Pelham ransacked the coast between Dingle and Cork, while Ormonde harried the interior of the country. The western chiefs one by one submitted to Ormonde. At Cork, there was a great meeting of all the lords and chiefs, and all were received to mercy except Lord Barrymore; but Pelham, acting on the advice of Sir Warham St. Leger, took them along with him to Limerick. Desmond was still at large, but his power had been crippled.

He instigated the eponymously-named "Pelham's Pardon" to bring the rebellion under control. This was his decision to refuse any "rebel" the right to surrender unless he had killed another suspected rebel of higher rank.

Pelham, who insisted on unconditional surrender, was preparing for a fresh inroad into Kerry, when he received information that the new viceroy, Arthur Grey, 14th Baron Grey de Wilton, had arrived at Dublin. It was originally intended to send Sir Henry Wallop with the sword of state to Dublin; but Pelham was offended at the lack of courtesy shown to him by the Deputy's secretary, Edmund Spenser, and determined to go himself to Dublin. He was detained for some time about Athlone by bad weather, and it was not till 7 September that he formally resigned the sword of state to the deputy in St. Patrick's Cathedral, Dublin. There was some talk of making him President of Munster, and he accompanied Grey to Drogheda to inspect the fortifications; but being taken dangerously ill, he returned to Dublin in a wagon. He obtained permission to return to England, and left Ireland early in October.

On 16 January 1581 he was joined in commission with George Talbot, 6th Earl of Shrewsbury and Sir Henry Neville to convey Mary, Queen of Scots, from Sheffield to Ashby de la Zouch Castle in Leicestershire, a house of Henry Hastings, 3rd Earl of Huntingdon. They were intended to confiscate Mary's papers and send them to London. However, these orders were cancelled and Mary remained in the keeping of the Earl of Shrewsbury at Chatsworth House.

Pelham still retained the office of lieutenant-general of the ordnance, but he was deeply in debt, and Elizabeth refused either to remit or stall the debts. She made the payment of his arrears a requirement to permit him to serve under Robert Dudley, 1st Earl of Leicester in the Netherlands. Leicester and Lord Burghley induced her to accept a mortgage on his property, and in July 1586 he joined Leicester in the Netherlands.

=== Career in the Netherlands ===
Leicester, who thought highly of his military abilities, created him marshal of the army, so giving great offence to Sir John Norris and his brother Sir Edward Norris. As for Pelham, he shared Leicester's prejudices against the Norrises, and at a drinking bout on 6 August at Count Hohenlohe's quarters at Geertruidenberg, he was the cause of a brawl which nearly cost Sir Edward Norris his life. A few days later, while inspecting the trenches before Doesburg in company with Leicester, he was wounded by a shot in the stomach; the wound did not prove immediately fatal. He was able to take part in the fight at Zutphen, and, according to Fulke Greville, 1st Baron Brooke, it was the desire to emulate him that made Sir Philip Sidney lay aside his cuisses and so to receive the wound that caused his death. He was entrusted with the task of bringing the recalcitrant citizens of Deventer to heel. He returned to England with the Earl of Leicester in April 1587, and took the waters at Bath. He was sent back with reinforcements to the Netherlands in the autumn, but died shortly after landing at Vlissingen, on 24 November 1587.

== Works ==
Pelham's Letter Book, comprising his diary and official correspondence when lord justice of Ireland, is preserved among the Carew Manuscripts at Lambeth. It was compiled by Morgan Colman, and consists of 455 leaves. The title page is elaborately ornamented. Pelham wrote commendatory verses prefixed to Sir George Peckham's A true Reporte of the late Discoveries ... of the Newfound Landes: By ... Sir Humphrey Gilbert, London, 1583. There is a tract by him, with the title, A form or maner howe to have the Exersyse of the Harquebuse thorowe England for the better Defence of the same, in 'State Papers,’ Dom. Eliz. xliv. 60.

== Family ==
Pelham married, first, Eleanor (died 1574), daughter of Henry Neville, 5th Earl of Westmorland and his first wife Anne Manners. By her, he had one son, Sir William Pelham, who succeeded him, and married Ann, eldest daughter of Charles Willoughby, 2nd Baron Willoughby of Parham and Margaret Clinton.

He had a second wife by 1576. She became Dorothy Pelham (died 1623). Her father was Anthony Catesby of Whiston, Northamptonshire, and she was the widow of Sir William Dormer, He and his second wife had a son, Peregrine, and a daughter, Ann. Dorothy left an endowment that became part of the foundation of the Royal Grammar School, High Wycombe.

Military offices
Preceded by Edward Randolph	Lieutenant-General of the Ordnance; 1567–1587	Succeeded by Sir Robert Constable
