= Henry Sidney =

English politician and courtier (1529–1586)

Sir Henry Sidney KG
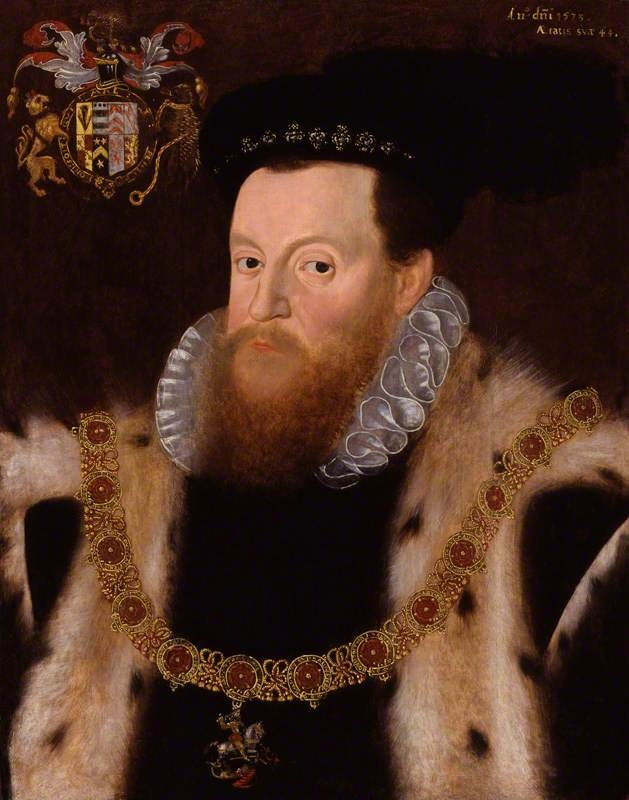
- Portrait by Arnold Bronckorst, 1573
- Born: 20 July 1529
- Died: 5 May 1586 (aged 56); Ludlow Castle (in modern-day Shropshire, England)
- Offices: Lord Deputy of Ireland; Lord President of Wales
- Noble family: Sidney
- Spouse: Mary Dudley (m.1551)
- Issue: Sir Philip Sidney; Mary Margaret Sidney; Elizabeth Sidney; Mary, Countess of Pembroke; Robert Sidney, 1st Earl of Leicester; Ambrosia Sidney; Sir Thomas Sidney
- Father: Sir William Sidney
- Mother: Anne Pakenham

Sir Henry Sidney KG (20 July 1529 – 5 May 1586) was an English soldier, politician and Lord Deputy of Ireland. Instrumental in the Tudor conquest of Ireland, his attempts to consolidate English power in Ireland were a major contributing factor to the Desmond Rebellions.

== Background ==
Sidney was the eldest son of Sir William Sidney of Penshurst (1482 – 11 February 1553) and Anne Pakenham (1511 – 22 October 1544). His father was a prominent politician and courtier during the reigns of Henry VIII and Edward VI, from both of whom he received extensive grants of land, including the manor of Penshurst in Kent, named Penshurst Place, which became the principal residence of the family.

Sidney was brought up at court as the companion of Prince Edward, later Edward VI, and he continued to enjoy the favour of the Crown, serving under Mary I and then, particularly, throughout the reign of Queen Elizabeth I.

== Career ==
=== First trip to Ireland ===
In 1556, Sidney served in Ireland with the Lord Deputy, Thomas Radclyffe, 3rd Earl of Sussex, who in the previous year had married his sister Frances. Both served Queen Mary I until her death in 1558. Sidney played a large part in expanding the English administration in the country, which had shrunk over the centuries to the area around Dublin known as the Pale. He was also involved in the civil and military measures taken by his brother-in-law for bringing Irish chieftains into submission to the English Crown, known as Surrender and Regrant.

In the course of the Lord Deputy's expedition to Ulster in 1557, Sidney devastated the island of Rathlin. In the following year, during the absence of Sussex in England, he had sole responsibility for the government of Ireland and conducted himself with marked ability. A second absence of the Lord Deputy from Ireland, on the accession of Queen Elizabeth I, threw the chief control into Sidney's hands at the outbreak of trouble with Shane O'Neill, and he displayed great skill in temporising with the chieftain until Sussex reluctantly returned to his duties in August 1559. About the same time, Sidney resigned his office of Vice-Treasurer of Ireland on his appointment as president of the council of the Marches in Wales, and for the next few years, he resided chiefly at Ludlow Castle, with frequent visits to the court in London.

=== In Scotland ===
Queen Elizabeth sent Sidney to Scotland in July 1562. He was instructed to defer a meeting between Elizabeth and Mary, Queen of Scots, to the next year. The Scottish queen was unhappy at the news and wept.

While he was with Mary, Queen of Scots, in the garden of Holyrood Palace there was an embarrassing incident. A Captain Hepburn came up to the queen and handed her a paper while she was talking to Sidney. She passed it to her brother, James Stewart, Earl of Mar, who opened it to discover four stanzas of obscene verse and a pornographic drawing. Meanwhile, Hepburn had fled to England. Mary was particularly affronted that Hepburn's intervention occurred during her meeting with Sidney.

=== Lord Deputy ===
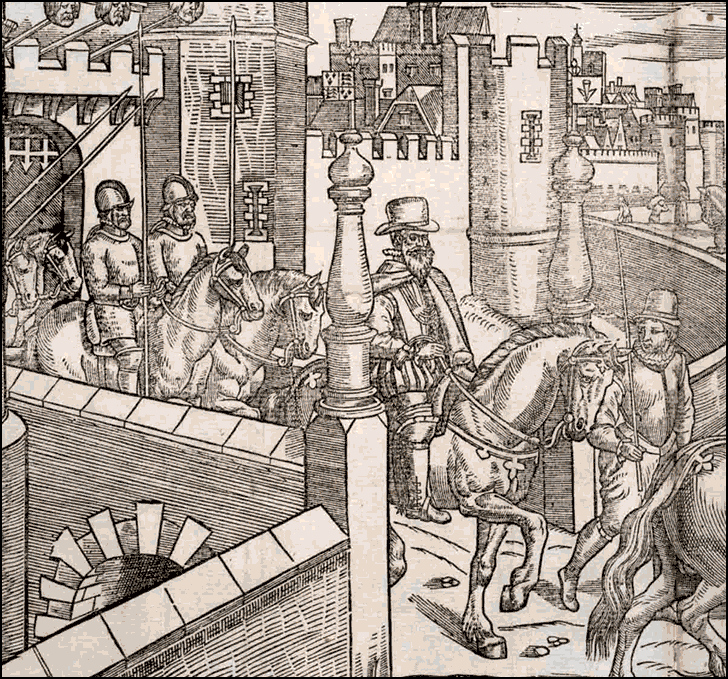
Sir Henry Sidney sets out from Dublin Castle. Detail from a plate in The Image of Irelande, by John Derrick (London, 1581).

In 1565, Sidney was appointed Lord Deputy of Ireland in place of Sir Nicholas Arnold, who had succeeded the Earl of Sussex in the previous year. He said he found the English Pale to be in a more impoverished and turbulent condition than when he left it, and claimed the chief disturbing factor to be Shane O'Neill, Chief of the Name of Clan O'Neill. With difficulty he persuaded Elizabeth to sanction vigorous measures against O'Neill; and although the latter avoided a pitched battle, Sidney restored O'Neill's rival Calvagh O'Donnell to his rights, and established an English garrison at Derry to prevent O'Neill expanding his influence.

In 1567, after being defeated by Clan O'Donnell at the Battle of Farsetmore, Shane surrendered himself to the Chief of Clan MacDonnell of Antrim, who immediately had O'Neill stabbed to death and beheaded during a feast at Cushendall as part of a secret agreement with Sidney. In the aftermath, Sidney turned his attention to the south, where he provoked a quarrel between Gerald FitzGerald, 14th Earl of Desmond, and Thomas Butler, 10th Earl of Ormond, and he executed or imprisoned others he deemed to be disturbers of the peace; then, returning to Ulster, he compelled Turlough Luineach O'Neill, Shane's successor as Chief of the Name, to make submission. Sidney placed garrisons at Belfast and Carrickfergus to dominate both Clan O'Donnell of Tír Eoghain and Clan MacDonnell of Antrim.

Sidney's time as Lord Deputy is controversial, due to the fact that the government extended its campaign against not only Gaelic military opponents in the field of battle, but also killings against the general population of the peasantry at large.

One of the grimmer aspects of government activity during this period was the formal extension of military severity over large sections of the ordinary populace. Threatening the peasantry was a guaranteed way to sever the ties binding the broad mass of ordinary people to their traditional local rulers. In the course of the crown campaigns the killing of the low-born became widespread. It was even considered unremarkable. Returning from one of his outings Lord Deputy Sidney joked in a letter to Whitehall that he had killed so many Irish 'varlets', he had lost count.

— David Edwards, Age of Atrocity: Violence and Political Conflict in Early Modern Ireland, 2010.

=== Desmond Rebellions ===
In the autumn of 1567, Sidney returned to England, and was absent from Ireland for the next ten months. On his return, he urged Lord Burghley to take measures to exploit what he saw as the potential of Ireland, to open up the country by the construction of roads and bridges, to replace the Irish clan system in Ulster with a system of freehold land tenure, and to repress the Gaelic customs prevalent in every part of the island. In 1569, he oversaw the opening of a parliament in Dublin, the first to be held for ten years. He proposed the establishment of the Court of Castle Chamber – an Irish version of the Star Chamber – which drew the encouragement of the Queen and was established after his recall.

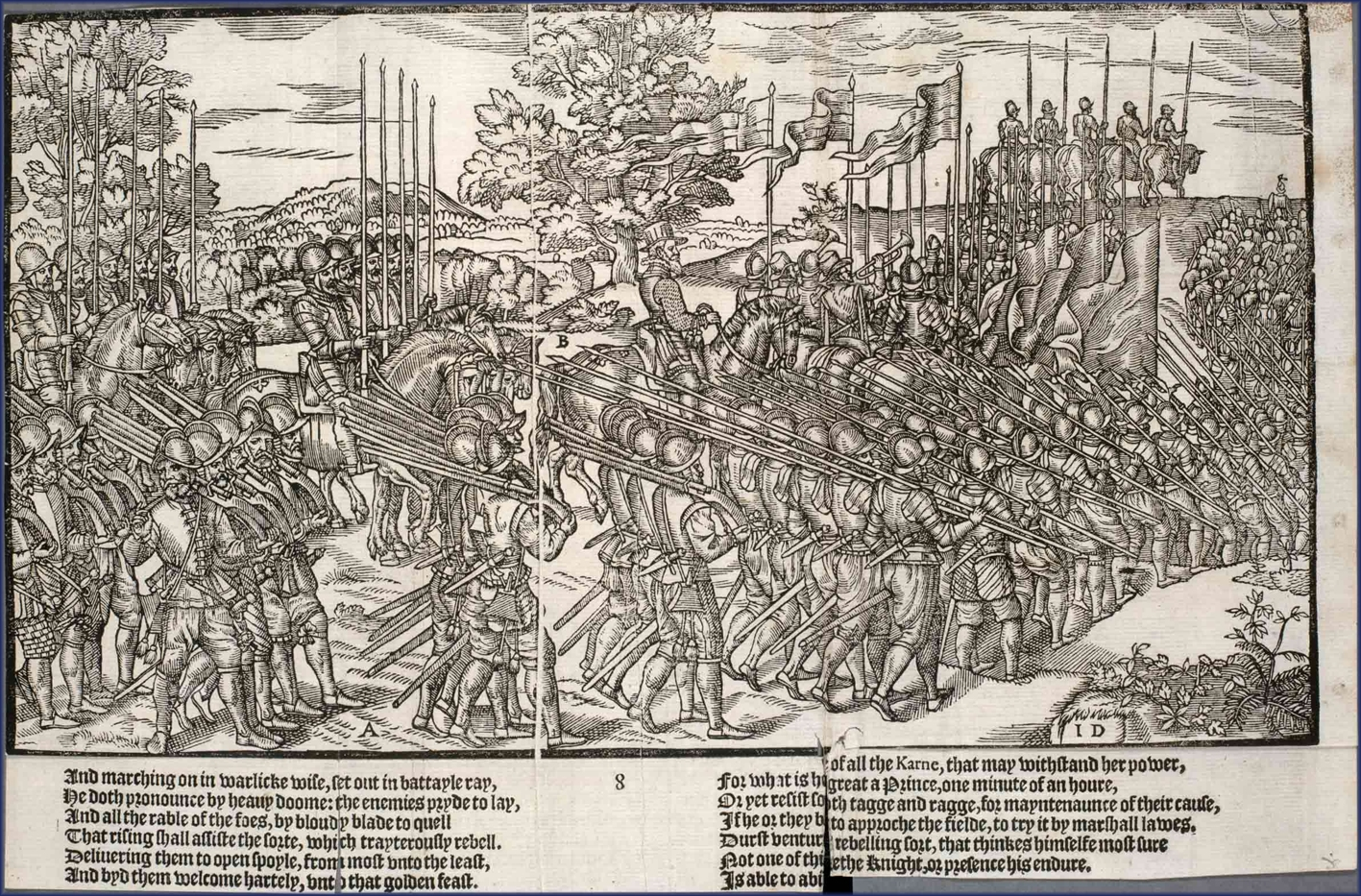
Sidney and the English army on the march with standards and trumpets, from The Image of Irelande, 1581

Sidney proposed the appointment of a military governor ("Lord President") in the provinces of Munster and Connacht. This provoked the first of the Desmond Rebellions led by James Fitzmaurice Fitzgerald of the Geraldine family, which had been put down with great severity by 1573. Sidney turned on the Hiberno-Norman Butlers in Ormond and Kilkenny, who had revolted against the opportunistic claims to their lands by Sir Peter Carew, an adventurer from Devon who pursued his entitlement with the blessing of the Dublin government. In 1570, many followers of Sir Edmund Butler of Cloughgrenan were hanged, and three brothers of Thomas Butler, 3rd Earl of Ormonde, were attainted by an act of the Irish parliament.

Sidney left Ireland in 1571, aggrieved by the slight appreciation shown by Queen Elizabeth. In September 1575 he returned with greater royal authority, to find matters in a worse state than before. In Antrim the MacQuillan of the Route and Sorley Boy MacDonnell were the chief fomenters of clan warfare, and after pacifying this northern territory Sidney repaired to the south, where he was equally successful in making his authority respected. He left his mark on the administrative areas of the island by creating shire divisions on the English model.

At an earlier period, he had combined the districts of the Ardes and Clandeboye to form the county of Carrickfergus, and had converted the country of Clan O'Farrell into the County Longford. He then carried out a similar policy in Connacht, where the lands of Clan O'Brien in Thomond became County Clare, and the counties of Galway, Mayo, Sligo and Roscommon were also delimited.

Sidney also suppressed a rebellion headed by the earl of Clanricarde and his sons in 1576, and hunted Rory O'More to his death two years later. Sidney has also been implicated in the infamous atrocity against the seven Clans of Laois as the Massacre of Mullaghmast in 1578.

=== The Cess Controversy ===
Meantime Sidney's annual levy (the cess), which was designed to fund a central government militia, had caused discontent among the gentry of the Pale, who sent a deputation of eminent barristers to London to carry their grievances in person to Queen Elizabeth. They were supported by several leading figures in the Irish Government, notably the Lord Chancellor of Ireland, Sir William Gerard. Gerard's defection was a bitter blow to Sidney, who for the previous five years had regarded Gerard as his indispensable ally, ("my chief counsellor"), and the resulting quarrel between the two men weakened Sidney's position. The arguments that the cess policy was mistaken were ultimately successful: greatly to Sidney's chagrin, the queen censured his conduct. He was recalled in September 1578, and was coldly received by Elizabeth.

=== Coat of Arms ===
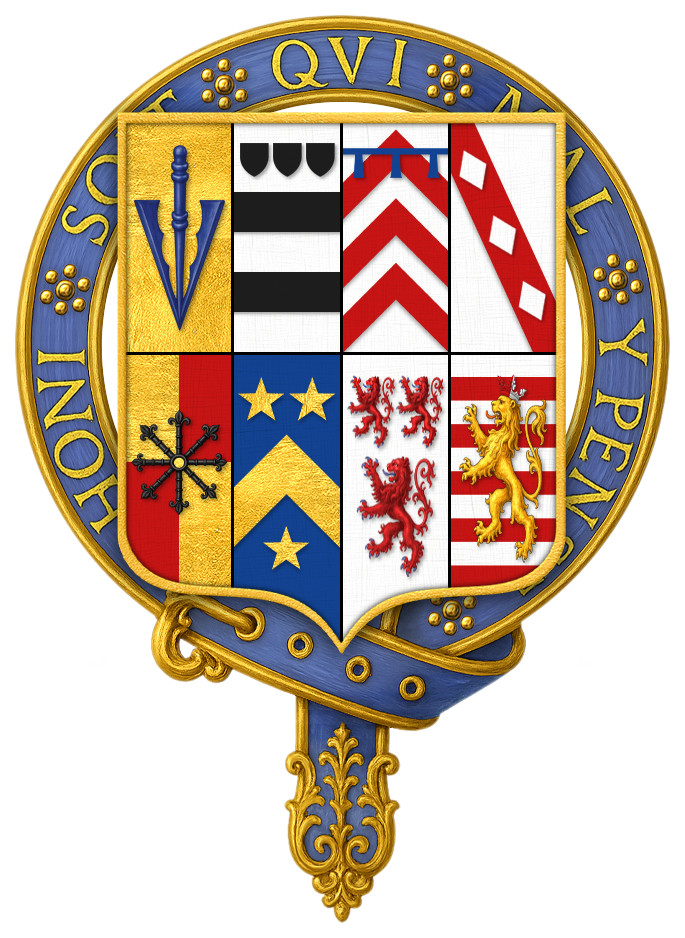
Quartered arms of Sir Henry Sidney, KG

These arms, which are shown within the Garter in the portrait, are the same as those which appear on Sir Henry's Garter Stall Plate in St. George's Chapel, Windsor. The quarterings are blazoned and identified in 3 D 14, folio 236B. The first is Sidney, the second Clunford, the third Barrington, the fourth Mercy, the fifth Mandeville (the escarbuncle in the portrait is painted in a ghost-like way but it should be black), the sixth Chetwyn, the seventh Belhouse (the lions should be shown between three black cross-croslets), and the eighth Brandon (here the lion's crown should be per pale Gules and Argent).

In the portrait, the porcupine in the crest should be blue with gold prickles, collar and line, as should the sinister supporter. The dexter supporter is simply the lion from the Brandon arms and should be so blazoned with a blue collar and line rather than a gold collar and chain.

=== Later years ===
From his position on the Privy Council in London, Sidney used his influence in the bloody suppression of the Second Desmond Rebellion, which led to a great loss of life in Munster in the period 1579–83, and ultimately to the plantation of the province with settler and planter families.

He lived chiefly at Ludlow Castle for the remainder of his life, performing his duties as president of the Welsh Marches.

== Marriage and family ==
Sidney married Mary Dudley, eldest daughter of John Dudley, 1st Duke of Northumberland, in 1551. They had three sons and four daughters. His eldest son was Sir Philip Sidney, and his second was Robert Sidney, 1st Earl of Leicester.

His daughter, Mary Sidney, married Henry Herbert, 2nd Earl of Pembroke, and by reason of her literary achievements, was one of the most celebrated women of her time.

== See also ==
- Rathlin Island Massacre

Political offices
Preceded by The Earl of Sussex	Lord Deputy of Ireland; 1565–1571	Succeeded by Lords Justices
Preceded by William Fitzwilliam	Lord Deputy of Ireland; 1575–1578	Succeeded by Lords Justices
Preceded by John Williams, 1st Baron Williams de Thame	Lord President of Wales; 1560–1586	Succeeded by Earl of Pembroke
