= James FitzMaurice FitzGerald =

Captain of Desmond, Ireland (died 1579)

James fitz Maurice FitzGerald
- Died: 18 August 1579 Ireland
- Conflicts: Desmond Rebellions
- Spouse: Katherine Burke
- Children: Maurice, Gerald, and Alice

James fitz Maurice FitzGerald (died 1579), called "fitz Maurice", was an Irish rebel who led the First Desmond rebellion and the Second Desmond rebellion, he was the captain-general of Desmond while Gerald FitzGerald, 14th Earl of Desmond, was detained in England by Queen Elizabeth I after the Battle of Affane in 1565.

Outraged by the religious persecution of the Catholic Church in Ireland, Fitzmaurice led the first Desmond Rebellion, intending to replace Queen Elizabeth with Don John of Austria of the House of Habsburg as the new High King of Ireland, in 1569 and was accordingly called the "Archtraitor" by the English. He surrendered in 1573, prostrating himself in Kilmallock church before John Perrot, president of Munster.

In 1575, when the Earl returned to Ireland, FitzMaurice went into exile on the continent. In July 1579, Fitzmaurice returned to Ireland with a small force, landing at Dingle and then sailing around the tip of the Dingle Peninsula into Ard na Caithne and occupying Dún an Óir (Fort of Gold). Fitzmaurice died while on a secret pilgrimage to Holy Cross Abbey in Thurles, after being wounded in a skirmish against his cousin Theobald Burke on 18 August.

Family tree

James fitz Maurice FitzGerald with wife, parents, and other selected relatives. (Note: This family tree is based on a graphic tree an on written genealogies of the earls of Desmond and genealogies of the viscounts of Fermoy,)

John de facto 12th Earl d. 1536	More; O'Brien
James; 13th Earl d. 1558	More; O'Carroll d. 1548	Maurice fitz John d. 1564; Totane	Julia; O'Mulryan
Gerald; 14th Earl c. 1533 – 1583; Rebel Earl	James fitz Maurice; FitzGerald	Katherine; Burke	Maurice; 6th Viscount; Fermoy d. 1600	Eleanor; FitzGerald
Joan; Roche
Thomas fitz James; Ruadh

Legend

XXX	Subject of the article	XXX	Earls of Desmond	XXX	Viscounts; Fermoy

*d.v.p. = predeceased his father (decessit vita patris).

== Birth and origins ==
His father named Maurice fitz John FitzGerald (also known as "an tÓiteán") was an Hiberno Norman and his mother named Iúile Ní Mhaoilriain was the second daughter of Diarmuid Ó Maoilriain, chief of Owny, from Sulloghade in County Tipperary and was of full Gaelic descent,.

== Early life ==
Some time in his youth, Fitz Maurice married Katherine, daughter of William Burke of Muskerry.

James and Katherine had three children:

- Maurice, who died in 1588
- Gerald, who died in 1588
- Alice, married Niall, son of Aodh (or Hugh) mac Felim O'Neill of Clandeboye (d. c. 1600), and whose son Niall Óg O'Neill of Killyleagh, Antrim (d. 1628) married Sarah MacDonnell, daughter of Randal MacDonnell, 1st Earl of Antrim.

His father (i.e. Totane) killed James FitzGerald, the de jure 12th Earl of Desmond, called "Court Page", on 15 March 1540. This changed the status of Totane's elder brother from James FitzGerald, de facto 13th Earl of Desmond, to James FitzGerald, de jure 13th Earl of Desmond. The 13th Earl died in 1558 and was succeeded by his eldest son of his 2nd marriage, Gerald FitzGerald, 14th Earl of Desmond. The 13th Earl's first marriage had been annulled for consanguinity. Totane died in 1564.

== Captain of Desmond ==
In 1565 Gerald FitzGerald, 14th Earl of Desmond, was defeated by the Butlers in the private Battle of Affane. In 1567 the 14th Earl and his brother, John of Desmond, were detained and sent to the Tower of London. During their absence, fitz Maurice became captain general of County Desmond with the warrant of the Earl. This meant he had authority over the soldiers retained in the service of the Desmond FitzGeralds. This was arranged by Eleanor Butler, Countess of Desmond who had arrested fitz Maurice. In July 1568, fitz Maurice entered Clanmaurice, the territory of Thomas Fitzmaurice, 16th Baron Kerry and lord of Lixnaw, to levy tribute and assert the Desmond overlordship. Having seized 200 head of cattle and wasted the country, he was confronted by Lixnaw himself on the way home and utterly defeated.

At the end of 1568, the absent Earl of Desmond granted Sir Warham St Leger a lease of the barony of Kerricurrihy, which cast fitz Maurice's inheritance into confusion. In 1569 the lord deputy of Ireland, Sir Henry Sidney, was informed by fitz Maurice that he had assembled the people of Desmond to tell them that the lord deputy was unable to procure the release of the captive earl, who would be executed or perpetually imprisoned, and that the people should proclaim a new earl or captain: with one voice, the people were said to have cried out for fitz Maurice to be captain. The earl's wife, Eleanor Butler, wrote to her husband in November that fitz Maurice was seeking to bring the earl into further disrepute and to usurp his inheritance, "by the example of his father".

To reassert Geraldine authority, fitz Maurice then launched what would become known as the first of the Desmond Rebellions. Southern Ireland erupted into a general rebellion, owing in part to attempts at establishing plantations. In June 1569, fitz Maurice and the Earl of Clancarty (MacCarthy Mor) invaded Kerrycurrihy, spoiled the inhabitants, took the castle-abbey of Tracton, hanged the garrison, and refused to depart without the surrender to them of the custody of Lady St Leger and Lady Grenville, the wives of the principal English colonists. Fitz Maurice then joined in league with the turbulent brothers of the earl of Ormond, and entered a bond with Conor O'Brien, 3rd Earl of Thomond, and John Burke, son of the Earl of Clanricard. He wrote to the mayor and corporation of Cork in July ordering the abolition of the new heresy of Protestantism, at a time when he appears to have been taking instruction from Irish Jesuits.

By September 1569, Sidney had broken the back of the rebellion and left Sir Humphrey Gilbert behind to suppress fitz Maurice, who sought refuge in the woods of Aherlow, south of Tipperary. After Gilbert's departure fitz Maurice raised a new force in February 1570 and by a surprise night attack on 2 March, took Kilmallock and after hanging the chief townsmen at the market cross, plundered its wealth and burned the town. In February 1571, Sir John Perrot landed at Waterford as President of Munster and challenged fitz Maurice to a duel, which fitz Maurice declined with the remark, "For if I should kill Sir John Perrot the Queen of England can send another president into this province; but if he do kill me there is none other to succeed me or to command as I do."

Fitz Maurice attacked Perrot, but retreated on mistaking a small cavalry company for the advance party of a larger force. After a second and successful siege by Perrot of the Geraldine stronghold of Castlemaine, fitz Maurice sued for pardon, which was granted in February 1573, after he prostrated himself in Kilmallock church with the president's sword point next to his heart. Fitz Maurice swore fealty to the crown, and gave up his son as hostage.

== Continental intrigue ==
After the return to Ireland of the Earl of Desmond in 1573, fitz Maurice left for the continent, offering his reasons variously as a desire to gain pardon from the queen through the French court, and the unkindness of the earl. In March 1575 he and his family, along with the Geraldine Seneschal of Imokilly, James Fitzedmund Fitzgerald, and the White Knight, Edmund Fitzgibbon, sailed on the La Arganys for Saint-Malo, Brittany, where they were received by the governor. He had several interviews with Catherine de' Medici in Paris, offering to help make Henry III of France king of Ireland, and was granted a pension of 5,000 crowns in 1576.

Early in the following year he left for the Spanish court, where he offered the crown to the brother of King Philip II, Don John; the king was cautious, however. Fitz Maurice left his sons Maurice and Gerald with Cardinal Granvelle, and travelled to Italy to meet Pope Gregory XIII.

== Invasion of Ireland ==
At the papal court fitz Maurice met the adventurer Captain Thomas Stukley, and together they persuaded the pope to underwrite the cost of 1,000 troops to invade Ireland, most of whom, according to O'Sullivan Beare, were desperadoes the pope wished to get out of Italy. Stukley left Civitavecchia early in 1578 with his troops. Fitz Maurice and Stukley were to rendezvous in Lisbon and proceed to Ireland. However, Stukley decided to lend his troops and support to King Sebastian's expedition to Morocco, where he died at the Battle of Alcacer Quibir on 4 August 1578.

Following the diversion of Stukley to Morocco, fitz Maurice set out with the nuncio, Nicholas Sanders, and Matthew de Oviedo from Ferrol in Galicia, Spain on 17 June 1579 with a few troops on his vessel and three Spanish shallops. They captured two English vessels in the channel and landed at Dingle on 17 July 1579, launching the Second Desmond Rebellion.

On the 18th they cast anchor in Smerwick, where they garrisoned at Dún an Óir (Fort of Gold), and were joined on the 25th by two galleys with 100 troops. Four days later their ships were captured by the English fleet under the command of Sir William Wynter. Having exhorted the Earl of Desmond and the Earl of Kildare, as Geraldine leaders, to fight the heretics, fitz Maurice left the fort to await the arrival of Stukley (who, unknown to him, had been killed at the Battle of Alcácer Quibir in the previous year, during a campaign by Sebastian, King of Portugal).

== Death ==
Fitz Maurice was killed in a skirmish with forces of his cousin Theobald Burke on 18 August 1579 when he went to make a vow at the monastery of the Holy Cross, Thurles, County Tipperary, but was caught in a skirmish with the forces of his cousin, Theobald Burke, during which he was shot in the hollow of the chest, but cut his way through to Burke and his brother William, both of whom he killed with single strokes of his sword.

The battle was won, but close to the scene his injuries overcame him; he made his will and ordered his friends to cut off and hide his head after death, so his enemies might not have it for a trophy. He also begged his attendants to attest that he had not turned tail in the face of the enemy. They so assured him, and asked him to be quiet because enemy soldiers were closing in, but he insisted, "My wounds are clear, my wounds are clear". Upon his death, a kinsman ordered the decapitation and then wrapped the head in cloth; an attempt was made to conceal his body under a tree, but it was discovered by a hunter and brought to the town of Kilmallock. For weeks, the body was nailed to the gallows, until it was shattered by musket fire and collapsed.

== Legacy ==
The invasion force at Smerwick was besieged and massacred after surrender in 1580 by the English. The tide turned in favour of the English, and the Second Desmond Rebellion ended in 1583, when the Earl of Desmond and his followers had been hunted down and killed by the English and the Irish clans who had once willingly risen and fought beneath the banners of the Earl.

The destruction of the Desmond Earldom ended with the Desmond lands being both devastated and parcelled out to English undertakers in the Plantation of Munster, which was a major step in the Tudor conquest of Ireland.

Since the beheading of Silken Thomas in 1537, fitz Maurice was the first Irish clan chief to use the ongoing religious persecution of English and Irish Catholics as a grounds for war against the House of Tudor. Hugh O'Neill and Red Hugh O'Donnell may have been inspired by fitz Maurice for their uprising, which became known as the Nine Years War.

Fitz Maurice is now regarded as the man the Geraldines ought to have chosen to lead them if they were to resist the English Reformation.

Timeline
As his birth date is uncertain, so are all his ages.
Age	Date	Event
0	1520, about	Born
19–20	1540, 19 Mar	Father killed James FitzGerald, de jure 12th Earl of Desmond (called Court Page)
19–20	1540, 7 Jul	Anthony St Leger (1st term), appointed Lord Deputy of Ireland
26–27	1547, 28 Jan	Accession of Edward VI, succeeding Henry VIII
29–30	1550, 4 Aug	Anthony St Leger, appointed Lord Deputy of Ireland (2nd term)
32–33	1553, 6 Jul	Accession of Mary I, succeeding Edward VI
37–38	1558, 17 Nov	Accession of Elizabeth I, succeeding Mary I
43–44	1564	Father (i.e. Totane) died.
44–45	1565, 8 Feb	Battle of Affane
44–45	1565, 13 Oct	Henry Sidney, appointed Lord Deputy of Ireland
48–49	1569	Outbreak of the first Desmond Rebellion
36–37	1570, 2 Mar	Took Kilmallock and burned it
52–53	1573, 23 Feb	Submitted to John Perrot by prostrating himself in the church of Kilmallock
57–58	1578, early in	Thomas Stukley leaves Civitavecchia with his troops for Portugal
58–59	1579, 17 Jul	Lands at Dingle launching the second Desmond Rebellion
58–59	1579, 18 Aug	Died.

== Notes and references ==
=== Sources ===
- Bagwell, Richard (1885). Ireland under the Tudors. Vol. II. London: Longmans, Green, and Co. OCLC 761857292. – 1558 to 1578
- Bagwell, Richard (1890). Ireland under the Tudors. Vol. III. London: Longmans, Green, and Co. OCLC 761857292. – 1579 to 1603
- Burke, Bernard (1866). A Genealogical History of the Dormant, Abeyant, Forfeited and Extinct Peerages of the British Empire (New ed.). London: Harrison. OCLC 11501348.
- Burke, Bernard; Burke, Ashworth Peter (1915). A Genealogical and Heraldic History of the Peerage and Baronetage, the Privy Council, Knightage and Companionage (77th ed.). London: Harrison. OCLC 1155471554.
- Clavin, Terry (October 2009). McGuire, James; Quinn, James (eds.). "FitzGerald (Butler), Eleanor". Dictionary of Irish Biography.
- Cokayne, George Edward (1916). Gibbs, Vicary (ed.). The complete peerage of England, Scotland, Ireland, Great Britain and the United Kingdom, extant, extinct, or dormant. Vol. IV (2nd ed.). London: St Catherine Press. OCLC 228661424. – Dacre to Dysart
- Dunlop, Robert (1889). "Fitzgerald, James Fitzmaurice (d.1579)" . Dictionary of National Biography. Vol. 19. pp. 125–127.
- Fitzgerald, Thomas W. H. (1910). Ireland and Her People; a Library of Irish Biography. Vol. III. Chicago: FitzGerald Book Company. OCLC 06775774. – Irish Biography (for fitz Maurice)
- Fryde, E. B.; Greenway, D. E.; Porter, S.; Roy, I., eds. (1986). Handbook of British Chronology. Royal Historical Society Guides and Handbooks, No. 2 (3rd ed.). London: Offices of the Royal Historical Society. ISBN 0-86193-106-8. – (for timeline)
- Hayden, Mary Teresa; Moonan, George Aloysius (1922). A Short History of the Irish People: from the earliest times to 1920. London: Longmans, Green and Co. OCLC 7113141319.
- Hayes-McCoy, Gerard Anthony (1976). "Chapter IV: The Completion of the Tudor Conquest and the Advance of the Counterreformation". In Moody, Theodore William; Martin, F. X.; Byrne, Francis John (eds.). A New History of Ireland. Vol. III. Oxford: Oxford University Press. pp. 94–141. ISBN 978-0-19-820242-4. – 1534–1691
- Joyce, Patrick Weston (1903). A Concise History of Ireland from the Earliest Times to 1837 (12th ed.). Dublin: M. H. Gill & Son. OCLC 815623752.
- McCormack, Anthony M. (2004). "FitzGerald, James fitz Maurice (d. 1579)". In Matthew, Colin; Harrison, Brian (eds.). Oxford Dictionary of National Biography. Vol. 19. New York: Oxford University Press. pp. 819–821. ISBN 0-19-861369-5.
- McCormack, Anthony M. (October 2009). McGuire, James; Quinn, James (eds.). "FitzGerald, James fitz Maurice". Dictionary of Irish Biography. – Fitz Maurice the "archtraitor"
- McGurk, J. J. N. (2004). "FitzGerald, Gerald fitz James, fourteenth earl of Desmond (c. 1533–1583)". In Matthew, Colin; Harrison, Brian (eds.). Oxford Dictionary of National Biography. Vol. 19. New York: Oxford University Press. pp. 809–811. ISBN 0-19-861369-5.
- Moody, Theodore William; Martin, F. X.; Byrne, Francis John, eds. (1984). A New History of Ireland. Vol. IX:Maps, Genealogies, Lists. Oxford: Oxford University Press. ISBN 0-19-821745-5.
- Wills, Rev. James (1840). "Gerald Sixteenth Earl of Desmond". Lives of illustrious and distinguished Irishmen, from the earliest times to the present period. Vol. II. Dublin: MacGregor, Polson & Co. pp. 11–40.
