= Gerald FitzGerald, 9th Earl of Kildare =

Lord Deputy of Ireland (1487–1534)

Gearóid Óg, 9th Earl of Kildare
- The 9th Earl of Kildare
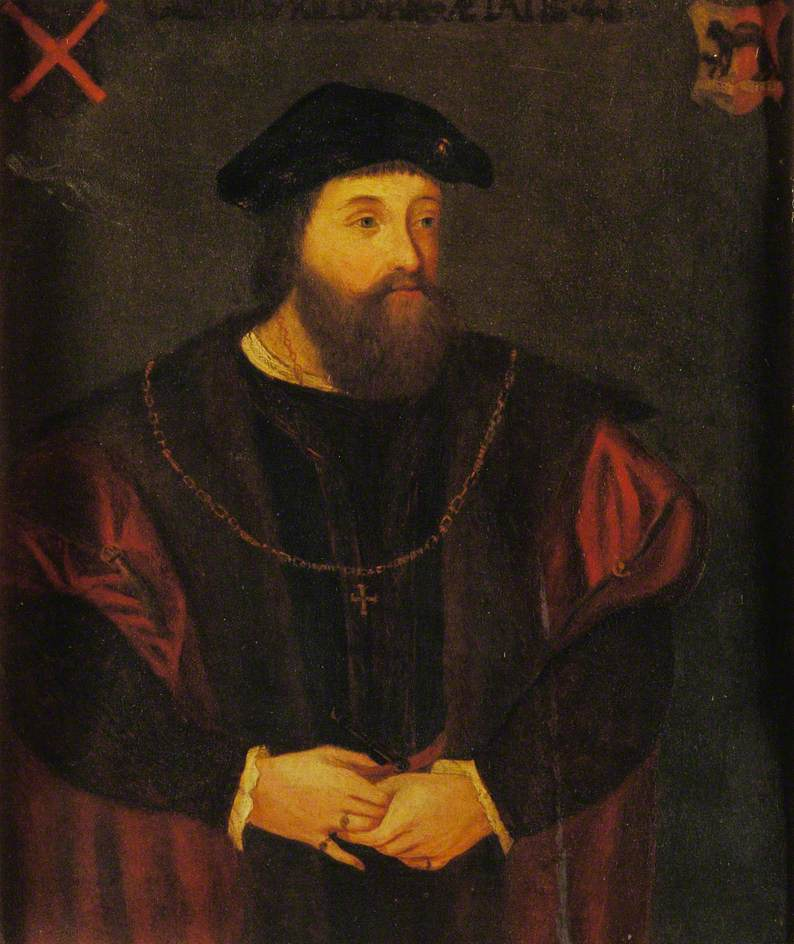
- Reign: 1513–1534
- Predecessor: Gerald FitzGerald
- Successor: Thomas FitzGerald
- Born: 1487; Maynooth, County Kildare
- Died: 12 December 1534 (aged 46–47); Tower of London
- Buried: Chapel Royal of St Peter ad Vincula
- Noble family: FitzGerald dynasty
- Spouse: Elizabeth Zouche; Elizabeth Grey
- Issue: Thomas FitzGerald, 10th Earl of Kildare; Lady Ellis FitzGerald; Gerald FitzGerald, 11th Earl of Kildare; Elizabeth FitzGerald, Countess of Lincoln; Edward FitzGerald; Anne FitzGerald; Margaret FitzGerald; Catherine FitzGerald
- Father: Gerald FitzGerald, 8th Earl of Kildare
- Mother: Alison FitzEustace
- Occupation: Lord High Treasurer of Ireland (1504–1514); Lord Deputy of Ireland

Gerard FitzGerald, 9th Earl of Kildare (1487 – 12 December 1534; Irish: Gearóid Óg Mac Gearailt, meaning "Young Gerald FitzGerald"), was a leading figure in 16th-century Irish history. In 1513 he inherited the title of Earl of Kildare and position of Lord Deputy of Ireland from his father.

== Family ==
He was the son of The 8th Earl of Kildare and his first wife, Alison FitzEustace, daughter of The 1st Baron Portlester. In 1503, at Collyweston, he married Elizabeth Zouche, daughter of Sir John Zouche of Codnor and Elizabeth St John, a first cousin of King Henry VII, (her father, John St John, was the maternal half-brother of Henry's mother, Margaret Beaufort) with whom he had:

- Thomas FitzGerald, 10th Earl of Kildare and
- Lady Allice/Ellis FitzGerald (born circa 1508, died after 1540), who married Christopher Fleming, 8th Baron Slane. This was her aunt (Lodge I, 87, 92). See also Gerald FitzGerald, 8th Earl of Kildare

He married secondly Lady Elizabeth Grey, who was like his first wife a cousin of the King, though a more distant one, and had a further seven children:

- Gerald FitzGerald, 11th Earl of Kildare,
- Elizabeth FitzGerald, Countess of Lincoln,
- Eleanor Fitzgearld ,
- Edward FitzGerald who married Agnes Leigh granddaughter of Joyce Culpeper who was the mother of Catherine Howard fifth wife of Henry VIII, and was the father of Gerald FitzGerald, 14th Earl of Kildare,
- Anne FitzGerald,
- Margaret FitzGerald,
- Catherine FitzGerald, who married firstly Jenico Preston, 3rd Viscount Gormanston; and secondly Richard St Lawrence, 7th Baron Howth; and
- Mary FitzGerald, who married Brian O'Connor Faly, Baron Offaly. It seems she died in a 1596 shipwreck on the 2nd Spanish Armada.

== Biography ==
Gerald FitzGerald, 9th Earl of Kildare was born in 1487 in Maynooth, County Kildare. He is referred to in the Irish annals as Gearóit Óge (the Younger Gerald) and as Garrett McAlison, after his mother, Alison FitzEustace, daughter of Rowland FitzEustace, 1st Baron Portlester.

In 1496, Gerald was detained by Henry VII at his court as a hostage for his father's fidelity. In April 1502, at the age of 15, he played the principal role in the funeral ceremony for Henry VII's eldest son Arthur, Prince of Wales in Worcester Cathedral.

In 1503, he was permitted to return with his father to Ireland, having married Henry VII's cousin Elizabeth Zouche. The next year he was appointed Lord Treasurer. In August 1504 he commanded the reserve at the Battle of Knockdoe, where his rashness and impetuosity were the cause of some loss of life. On the death of his father in 1513 he succeeded to the title, and was by the council chosen Lord-Justice. Henry VIII soon afterwards appointed him Lord-Deputy. His brother-in-law, Lord Slane succeeded him as Lord Treasurer.

Some of the Irish chiefs at the end of 1513 having ravaged parts of the Pale, the Earl, early in the following year, defeated O'More and his followers in Leix, and then, marching north, took the Castle of Cavan, killed O'Reilly, chased his followers into the bogs, and returned to Dublin laden with booty. This energetic action was so highly approved by the King that he granted the Earl the customs of the ports in the County of Down – rights repurchased by the Crown from the 17th Earl in 1662. In 1516 the Earl invaded Imayle in the Wicklow Mountains, and sent the head of Shane O'Toole as a present to the Lord Mayor of Dublin. He then marched into Ely O'Carroll, in conjunction with his brother-in-law the Earl of Ormond, and James, son of the Earl of Desmond. They captured and razed the Castle of Lemyvannan, took Clonmel, and in December he returned to Dublin "laden with booty, hostages, and honour".

In March 1517 he called a parliament in Dublin, and then invaded Ulster, stormed the Dundrum Castle, marched into Tír Eoghain, and took, the Castle of Dungannon, "and so reduced Ireland to a quiet condition". On 6 October of the same year his Countess died at Lucan, Dublin, and was buried at Kilcullen. Next year, 1518, his enemies having accused him of maladministration, he appointed a deputy and sailed for England. He was removed from the government, and Thomas Howard, 2nd Duke of Norfolk appointed in his stead. He appears to have accompanied the King to France in June 1520, and was present at "the Field of the Cloth of Gold", where he was distinguished by his bearing and retinue. On this occasion, he met the King's first cousin, Lady Elizabeth Grey, whom he married a few months afterwards, and thereby gained considerable influence at court.

Reports now came from Ireland that he was secretly striving to stir up the chieftains against the new Deputy. After inquiries, the King wrote to Surrey that, as they had "noon evident testimonies" to convict the Earl, he thought it but just to "release hym out of warde, and putt hym under suretie not to departe this our realme without our special lisense". He was permitted to return in January 1523.

At about this date he founded the College of Maynooth, which flourished until suppressed in 1538. He signalled his return to Ireland by an expedition into Leix in company with the Lord Mayor of Dublin. Having burnt several villages, they were caught in an ambuscade, and after considerable loss retreated with some difficulty to Dublin. In consequence of disputes and misunderstandings between the Earl of Kildare and Ormond, now Lord-Deputy, they appealed to the King, accusing each other of malpractices and treasons. Arbitrators were appointed, who ordered that both the Earls should abstain from making war without the King's assent, that they should cease levying coigne and livery within "the four obeysant shires – Meath, Urgell, Dublin, and Kildare", that the two Earls should persuade their kinsmen to submit to the laws, and that they should be bound by a bond of 1,000 marks each to keep the peace for one year.

Before long, however, their mutual hatred blazed forth again in consequence of the murder of James Talbot, one of Ormond's followers, by the retainers of Kildare. Again the Earls appealed to the King, and again commissioners were sent over, who conducted an inquiry at Christ Church, Dublin, in June 1524. Their decision was in the main in favour of Kildare, and an indenture was drawn up, by which the Earls agreed to forgive each other, to be friends, and to make common cause for the future. He was also reconciled with the Vice-Treasurer, Sir William Darcy, a former ally of the FitzGeralds who had become one of Gerald's most bitter opponents.

Soon afterwards Kildare was reappointed Lord-Deputy. He took the oaths at St. Thomas Court, his nephew, Conn Bacagh O'Neill, carrying the sword of state before him. He then entered into an indenture with the King not to grant pardons without the consent of the council, to cause the Irish in his territories to wear English dress, to shave their "upper berdes", and not to levy coigne and livery except when on the King's business, and then only to a specified amount, not exceeding 2d. a meal for horsemen, 1½d. for foot

Next year, 1525, Kildare and Ormond were again at daggers drawn. They appealed to the King concerning a disputed sum of £800 in account between them, accusing each other, as before, of sundry enormities and malfeasances. About the same time Kildare, in accordance with a royal mandate, assembled a large force, and marched into Munster to arrest the Earl of Desmond, making a show of great eagerness, but sending private instructions to the Earl on how to keep out of the way. He next turned north, and by diplomacy and force pacified the O'Neills and O'Donnells.

In 1526, he was ordered to England and he took with him his married daughter Alice, Lady Slane so that she could report back on his progress. He was summoned to meet the charges of Ormond (now Earl of Ossory through the surrender of the higher title to the King) of having secretly assisted the Desmonds, and having murdered many good subjects because they were adherents of the Ormond and the Butler family. On arrival in London, he was for a time committed to the Tower, and was retained in England for four years; and when he was brought before the council, a violent altercation ensued between him and Wolsey, which is reported at full length by Holinshed. Wolsey is said to have obtained an order for his immediate execution, which his well-wisher, the Constable of the Tower, frustrated by exercising a right (still inherent in the office) of demanding a personal interview with the King. Liberated on bail for a time, Kildare was recommitted on the discovery of his intriguing with the Irish princes to induce them to commit assaults on the Pale, so as to make his return appear necessary. Liberated again, he was one of the peers who in 1530 signed the letter to the Pope relative to the divorce of Queen Catharine.

The same year, to the joy of his retainers, he was permitted to return to Ireland with Skeffington, the new Lord-Deputy. On his arrival he marched against the O'Tooles to punish them for ravages on his tenantry in his absence, and then accompanied the Deputy against the O'Donnells. The friendship between the Deputy and Earl did not last long, and they sent letters and messages to the King accusing each other. The Deputy, as might be expected, was supported by the Butlers.

Nevertheless, the Earl appears to have cleared himself, and to have been appointed to succeed Skeffington as Lord Deputy under the Duke of Richmond, who had been granted the office of Lord-Lieutenant of Ireland. Landing at Dublin in this capacity, in August 1532, Kildare was received with great acclamation. But lengthened peace appeared impossible. He insulted Skeffington, degraded John Alen, Archbishop of Dublin, wasted the territories of the Butlers, and was accused of forming alliances with the native chiefs. In 1533, the council reported to the King that such was the animosity between the Earls of Kildare and Ormond that peace was out of the question so long as either of them was Lord Deputy.

== Death ==
At this period, Kildare had partially lost the use of his limbs and his speech, in consequence of a gunshot wound received in an attack upon the O'Carrolls at Birr. He was again summoned to court; and in February 1534, at a council at Drogheda, in an affecting speech, he nominated his son Thomas, Lord Offaly, as Vice-Deputy, and then, embracing him and the lords of the council, set sail for England.

On his arrival in London he was arraigned on several charges, and was committed to the Tower. False rumors that he had been executed reached Ireland, sparking his son Thomas to impetuously commence a revolt against English rule. On hearing of his son's rebellion, and perusing the excommunication launched against him, he died "of grief" in the Tower on 2 September 1534. He was buried in the Chapel Royal of St Peter ad Vincula in the Tower.

== Character ==
Lord Kildare was praised by contemporaries as "wise, deep, far-reaching and well-spoken". Later historians have described him, despite his ultimate failure, as a man of considerable intelligence, learning and diplomatic skill. In private life, he was a devoted husband and father, a generous host, a connoisseur of art and a great bibliophile.

== See also ==
- William Skeffington
- History of County Kildare

Peerage of Ireland
Preceded by Gerald FitzGerald	Earl of Kildare; 1513–1534	Succeeded by Thomas FitzGerald
Political offices
Preceded by Sir Hugh Conway	Lord Treasurer of Ireland; 1504–1514	Succeeded by The Lord Slane
Preceded by The Earl of Kildare	Lord Deputy of Ireland; 1513–1518	Succeeded by The Duke of Norfolk
Preceded by The Earl of Ormonde	Lord Deputy of Ireland; 1524–1529	Succeeded by Sir William Skeffington
Preceded by Sir William Skeffington	Lord Deputy of Ireland; 1532–1534	Succeeded by Sir William Skeffington
