= 1535 in Ireland =

- Centuries: 14th; 15th; 16th; 17th; 18th
- Decades: 1510s; 1520s; 1530s; 1540s; 1550s
- See also: Other events of 1535; List of years in Ireland

Events from the year 1535 in Ireland.

== Incumbent ==
- Lord: Henry VIII

== Events ==
- March – Silken Thomas' stronghold at Maynooth, County Kildare, is taken by an English force under Sir William Skeffington, in his absence.
- July – Lord Leonard Grey arrives from England as Lord Deputy of Ireland.
- August – Thomas FitzGerald, 10th Earl of Kildare (Silken Thomas) surrenders.
- October – Silken Thomas is sent as a prisoner to the Tower of London.

== Deaths ==
- William Skeffington
