= 1538 in Ireland =

- Centuries: 14th; 15th; 16th; 17th; 18th
- Decades: 1510s; 1520s; 1530s; 1540s; 1550s
- See also: Other events of 1538; List of years in Ireland

This is a list of events from the year 1538 in Ireland.

== Incumbent ==
- Lord: Henry VIII

== Events ==
- Dissolution of the Monasteries: the following establishments are among those suppressed:
  - Timolin Priory (held by Edmund Eustas from 14 January).
  - Ferns Abbey (abbot and canons leave 31 March).
  - Navan Abbey (surrendered 19 July).
  - Priory of All Hallows, Dublin.
- July 11 – Galway is visited by Lord Deputy of Ireland, Leonard Grey. This is the first visit of a King's Deputy to the town, and marks the start of closer relations between the sometimes-beleaguered town and the Anglo-Irish administration in Dublin. He is lavishly entertained and stays for seven days.
- December – the Franciscan Friary at Cashel is rented to Edmund Butler, Archbishop of Cashel.
- Newry Abbey becomes a secular collegiate church.
- Church of Ireland Kilkenny College is founded as Kilkenny Grammar School by Piers Butler, 8th Earl of Ormond, and his wife, Margaret, to replace the School of the Vicars Choral.
- Ulick na gCeann Burke deposes his uncle Richard Bacach Burke as The Clanricarde and Chief of the Name.
- A meeting between the O'Toole clan and crown forces at the Pale castle of Threecastles Castle, County Wicklow ends in an altercation with deaths.

== Deaths ==
- Richard Bacach Burke, the Clanricarde and Chief of the Name.
