= 1539 in Ireland =

- Centuries: 14th; 15th; 16th; 17th; 18th
- Decades: 1510s; 1520s; 1530s; 1540s; 1550s
- See also: Other events of 1539; List of years in Ireland

Events from the year 1539 in Ireland.

== Incumbent ==
- Lord: Henry VIII

== Events ==
- The Geraldine League is founded by Manus O'Donnell and Conn O'Neill and begins its invasion of The Pale.
- Dissolution of the Monasteries continues including the start of suppression of those within The Pale. Establishments surrendered include:
  - Ardee Priory Hospital (6 December) and White Friars Priory.
  - Arklow Priory.
  - Athboy Friary.
  - Athy Priory (30 April).
  - Bangor Abbey.
  - Cloncurry Friary (30 April).
  - Clonmines Friary.
  - Dundalk Priory Hospital (23 November).
  - Enniscorthy Abbey and Priory.
  - Fore Abbey (27 November).
  - Graney Abbey, Co. Kildare (7 February).
  - Grey Abbey, Kildare (30 April).
  - White Abbey, Kildare (April).
  - Kells Monastery, Co. Meath.
  - Kilcullen Abbey (by 30 April).
  - Killodry Priory.
  - Knock Abbey, Co. Louth.
  - Lismullin Priory, Co. Meath.
  - Louth Priory (20 November).
  - Mellifont Abbey (23 July).
  - Mullingar Priory (28 November).
  - Naas Priory (26 July).
  - Navan Abbey.
  - Odder Priory, Co. Meath.
  - Portrane Priory.
  - Priory Hospital of St. John the Baptist, Drogheda (26 July).
  - Priory Hospital of St. John the Baptist, Newtown Trim.
  - Rosbercon Abbey (20 June).
  - St. Catherine's Priory, Co. Dublin (25 June).
  - St. Catherine's Priory, Waterford.
  - St. John the Baptist Hospital, Dublin.
  - St. Mary's Abbey, Dublin (28 October).
  - St. Mary's Carmelite Friary, Dublin (3 August).
  - St. Saviour Dominican Friary, Dublin.
  - Skreen Friary.
  - Termonfeckin Abbey.
  - Tintern Abbey (County Wexford) (seized 25 July).
  - Tipperary Friary (7 April).
  - Tristernagh Abbey (by 10 December).
- Lands at Monkstown, Dublin, granted to Sir John Travers, Master of the Ordnance in Ireland.

== Deaths ==
- 26 August – Piers Butler, 8th Earl of Ormonde, Lord Treasurer (b. c.1467)
