= 1531 in Ireland =

- Centuries: 14th; 15th; 16th; 17th; 18th
- Decades: 1510s; 1520s; 1530s; 1540s; 1550s
- See also: Other events of 1531; List of years in Ireland

Events from the year 1531 in Ireland.

== Incumbent ==
- Lord: Henry VIII

== Events ==
- May – William Skeffington accepted the formal submission of the Gaelic leader Hugh Duff O'Donnell in Drogheda.
- Manus O'Donnell of Tyrconnell applies to the Lordship of Ireland for protection against the O'Neills of Tyrone.
- At the behest of O'Donnell, the Earl of Kildare and the Lord Justice of Ireland lead an English force into Ulster. They pillage the country until Kinard, where they turn back, daring not to venture further.
- A battle took place near the castle at Scairbh-Begoige, where Manus O'Donnell and his forces were routed by the Maguires.

== Births ==
- Thomas Butler, 10th Earl of Ormond

== Deaths ==
- Illann Buide Mac an Legha, renowned physician
- Sile Oc, daughter of Cairbre, chieftain of the O Birn of Sil Murray
- Donnchad O Briain, Tanist of Thomond

== Bibliography ==
- Arnold-Baker, Charles. The Companion to British History. Routledge, 2015
