= Margaret Fitzgerald =

Margaret Fitzgerald may refer to:

- Margaret Fitzgerald, Countess of Ormond (died 1542), daughter of Gerald FitzGerald, 8th Earl of Kildare and Alison FitzEustace
- Margaret Fitzgerald (supercentarian) (1896–2009), Canadian supercentenarian
- A main character in the film Million Dollar Baby, played by Hilary Swank
