= 1537 in Ireland =

- Centuries: 14th; 15th; 16th; 17th; 18th
- Decades: 1510s; 1520s; 1530s; 1540s; 1550s
- See also: Other events of 1537; List of years in Ireland

Events from the year 1537 in Ireland.

== Incumbent ==
- Lord: Henry VIII

== Events ==
- February 3 – the rebel Thomas FitzGerald, 10th Earl of Kildare ("Silken Thomas"), imprisoned in the Tower of London, is hanged, drawn and quartered, with his five uncles, at Tyburn.
- September 7 – Walter Cowley is appointed Principal Solicitor for Ireland.
- c. October – the Parliament of Ireland approves the Act of Supremacy by passing An Act authorising the King, His Heirs and Successors, to be supreme Head of the Church of Ireland and legislation enforcing Dissolution of the Monasteries together with the Treason Act (Ireland) 1537.
- Religious institutions suppressed include: Abbeydorney Abbey; Athassel Priory; Ballybroggan Priory; Crutched Friars Priory Hospital, Limerick; Rosenallis Monastery; St. Mary's Abbey, Duleek; and Sherkin Friary.
- Act prevents obstruction to navigation on the River Nore by weirs.
- Approximate date – Kilmacrenan Friary established.

== Deaths ==
- February 3 – Thomas FitzGerald, 10th Earl of Kildare, was hanged in Tyburn (b. 1513)
- Patrick Finglas, judge.
- Niall Oge O'Neill
