= 1534 in Ireland =

- Centuries: 14th; 15th; 16th; 17th; 18th
- Decades: 1510s; 1520s; 1530s; 1540s; 1550s
- See also: Other events of 1534; List of years in Ireland

Events from the year 1534 in Ireland.

== Incumbent ==
- Lord: Henry VIII

== Events ==
- February – Gerald FitzGerald, 9th Earl of Kildare, is summoned to London, and appoints Thomas FitzGerald, 10th Earl of Kildare deputy governor of Ireland in his absence.
- June – Thomas FitzGerald, 10th Earl of Kildare (Silken Thomas) revolts. He had heard rumours that his father had been executed in the Tower of London and, as a result, publicly renounces his allegiance to King Henry VIII.
- July
  - Thomas FitzGerald attacks Dublin Castle, but his army is routed.
  - An earthquake with its epicentre in North Wales is felt in Dublin.
- July 28 – Archbishop John Alen, Chancellor of Ireland (who has attempted to mediate in the revolt) is murdered at Clontarf by retainers of Thomas FitzGerald.
- September 2 – Gerald FitzGerald, 9th Earl of Kildare, Thomas' father, dies in the Tower of London.

== Deaths ==
- September 2 – Gerald FitzGerald, 9th Earl of Kildare (b. 1487)
- Thomas FitzGerald, 11th Earl of Desmond
- John Alen, English-born canon lawyer, Archbishop of Dublin (b. 1476).
