= 1529 in Ireland =

- Centuries: 14th; 15th; 16th; 17th; 18th
- Decades: 1500s; 1510s; 1520s; 1530s; 1540s
- See also: Other events of 1529; List of years in Ireland

Events from the year 1529 in Ireland.

== Incumbent ==
- Lord: Henry VIII

== Events ==
- September – Richard Gare Lynch becomes Mayor of Galway.
- Thomas Fitzgerald (1454–1534), becomes Earl succeeding his uncle James FitzGerald, 10th Earl of Desmond.
- William Skeffington was appointed Lord Deputy of Ireland to Henry's son, the duke of Richmond, the nominal Lord Lieutenant of Ireland
- Sir Thomas Boleyn, father of Anne Boleyn, became the Earl of Wiltshire and Ormonde.

== Deaths ==
- June 18 – James FitzGerald, 10th Earl of Desmond died in Dingle.
- Brian Ballagh II O'Neill
