= Margaret Butler, Countess of Ormond =

Irish countess (died 1542)

Margaret Butler
- Countess of Ormond & Countess of Ossory
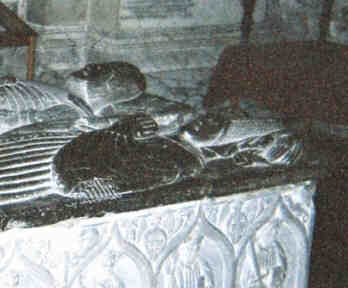
- Her effigy in St Canice
- Born: c. 1473
- Died: 9 August 1542; Kilkenny, Ireland
- Buried: St Canice's Cathedral, Kilkenny
- Spouse: Piers Butler, 8th Earl of Ormond
- Issue Detail: James, Richard, & others
- Father: Gerald, 8th Earl of Kildare
- Mother: Alison FitzEustace

Margaret Butler (née FitzGerald), Countess of Ormond, Countess of Ossory (c. 1473 – 9 August 1542) was an Irish noblewoman and a member of the powerful and celebrated FitzGerald dynasty also known as "The Geraldines". She married Piers Butler, 8th Earl of Ormond, by whom she had three sons and six daughters.

In 1501, she rebuilt Gowran Castle. In 1502, she also decorated St. Mary's Collegiate Church Gowran where her husband Sir Piers Butler's ancestors are buried including, Edmund Butler, Earl of Carrick and Lord Deputy of Ireland, his son James Butler, First Earl of Ormonde, his grandson also James Butler second Earl of Ormonde his great grandson James Butler, third Earl of Ormonde. James Butler, third Earl of Ormonde built the first castle in Gowran in 1385 and made it his main residence. He bought Kilkenny Castle in 1391. She was a patron of schools and craftsmen and also played an active role in legal affairs pertaining to the Ormond estates. She is sometimes styled the Great Countess of Ormond or called by her Irish name of Mairgread Gerroid. James Graves in his History of the Cathedral Church of St. Canice, Kilkenny says she was "unquestionably one of the most remarkable women of her age and country".

== Birth and origins ==
Lady Margaret was born in Ireland, the daughter of Gerald FitzGerald, 8th Earl of Kildare and his first wife Alison FitzEustace, daughter of Rowland FitzEustace, 1st Baron Portlester. (Note: Historians and genealogists are uncertain as to the identity of Alison FitzEustace's mother. Rowland FitzEustace married three times; it is most likely that her mother was either the first wife, Elizabeth Brune or his second wife, Joan/Genet Bellew, whom he married in about 1463. The dates make it highly unlikely that his third wife, Margaret Dartas/Maud D'Artois could have mothered Alison. Burke's Peerage states that Joan/Genet Bellew was Alison's mother. Cokayne's The Complete Peerage, Vol.VII, pp.229–232 also favours Joan as having been her mother, but adds in a footnote that "According to some accounts, Alison is said to have been da. of Lord Portlester by Margaret, da. and coh. of Jenico D'Artois of Ardglass and Strangford, co. Down".) She had a brother Gerald FitzGerald, 9th Earl of Kildare, three sisters, Lady Eleanor Fitzgerald (ca. 1482-after 1541), Lady Alice, and Lady Eustacia; and five half-brothers from her father's later marriage to Elizabeth St. John following the death of her mother on 22 November 1495.

Her father was the premier nobleman in Ireland and he also served as Lord Deputy of Ireland during the reigns of English kings Edward IV, Edward V, Richard III, Henry VII, and Henry VIII. One of her nephews was Thomas FitzGerald, 10th Earl of Kildare, known in Irish history as "Silken Thomas"; and one of her nieces was the Countess of Lincoln, the celebrated "Fair Geraldine", by her brother Gerald's second wife, Lady Elizabeth Grey.

Margaret was also known by her Irish name of Mairgread Gerroid, or else playfully as Magheen or Little Margaret, due to her tall stature.

== Marriage and issue ==
In 1485, she married Piers Ruadh Butler, son of Sir James Butler of Polestown (modern day Paulstown) and Sabh Kavanagh. The marriage was political; arranged with the purpose of ending the long-standing rivalry between the two families. In the early years of their marriage, Margaret and her husband were reduced to penury by James Dubh Butler, an illegitimate nephew and agent of the absentee Thomas Butler, 7th Earl of Ormond, who resided in England and was rumoured to have been the wealthiest subject in the realm. Piers retaliated by killing James Dubh in a skirmish in 1497; however, he received a pardon for his crime on 22 February 1498. Piers had a claim to the Earldom of Ormond, and on 3 August 1515, upon the death of the 7th Earl of Ormond (who had only two daughters as heirs), he succeeded as the 8th Earl of Ormond. Years earlier, in 1498, he and Margaret had seized Kilkenny Castle and made it their chief residence. Through her considerable efforts, the standard of living inside the castle had been greatly improved.

In 1528, Margaret's husband was persuaded to renounce his Ormond title in favour of one of his rival claimants, the 7th Earl's grandson, Sir Thomas Boleyn, whose daughter, Anne Boleyn was being courted by King Henry VIII with the purpose of making her queen consort. In 1522, there had been a proposal that Anne should marry James, the eldest son of Margaret and Piers, in an attempt to resolve the dispute over the earldom which had broken out following the death of the 7th Earl and subsequent accession of Piers. She would have brought her Ormond inheritance as dowry, and thus ended the dispute. For reasons unknown, the marriage negotiations ended in failure, and the King shortly afterwards became enamoured of Anne. To please her as well as elevate her in rank, Henry decided to bestow the earldoms of Ormond and Wiltshire upon her father. Aided by Cardinal Thomas Wolsey Piers was compensated for his loss of title by being made 1st Earl of Ossory that same year (1528). In 1535, James was created Viscount Thurles.

Together Margaret and Piers had three sons:

1. James Butler, 9th Earl of Ormond, Viscount Thurles (1496–1546), married Lady Joan Fitzgerald, by whom he had issue.
2. Richard Butler, 1st Viscount Mountgarret (1500–1571),{ married Eleanor Butler, by whom he had issue.
3. Thomas Butler (died 1532), killed at Ballykeely by Dermod Mac Gillpatrick, tanist of Ossory

—and six daughters:

1. Margaret Butler, married firstly Richard de Burgh "MacWilliam", by whom she had issue; secondly Barnaby FitzPatrick, 1st Baron of Upper Ossory, by whom she had issue; and thirdly Thomas Fitzgerald, by whom she had two daughters.
2. Catherine Butler (died 1553), married firstly Richard Power, 1st Baron Le Power and Coroghmore, by whom she had issue; her second husband was James Fitzgerald, 14th Earl of Desmond
3. Joan Butler, married James Butler of Dunboyne, by whom she had issue
4. Ellice (1481–1530). Married firstly to MacMorrish; and secondly in 1503 to Gerald Fitzgerald, 3rd Lord Decies (1482–1533), grandson of James FitzGerald, 6th Earl of Desmond.
5. Eleanor Butler (died after 1550), married Thomas Butler, 1st Baron Cahir, by whom she had issue
6. Helen Butler (died 1597), married Donough O'Brien, 2nd Earl of Thomond, by whom she had issue

== Countess of Ormond ==
The earldom of Ormond was restored to Piers on 22 February 1538 after Thomas Boleyn, whose daughter Queen Anne Boleyn had been executed for High Treason in 1536, died. Prior to that date, Piers and Margaret had continued to style themselves as Earl and Countess of Ormond.

Margaret was sometimes called the "Great Countess of Ormond". She signed herself "Margaret Fitzgerald of the Geraldines", and occupied herself in legal matters regarding her family and the Ormond estates, having worked with Piers in developing the estate, expanding and rebuilding manor houses. She also established Kilkenny Grammar School. She urged Piers to bring over skilled weavers and artificers from Flanders and she helped establish industries for the production of carpets, tapestries and diapers (a type of cloth). Margaret and her husband were responsible for having commissioned significant additions to the castles of Granagh and Ormond. They also rebuilt Gowran Castle, which had been originally constructed in 1385 by James Butler, 3rd Earl of Ormond.

Richard Stanihurst described Margaret as having been "manlike and tall of stature, liberal and bountiful, a sure friend and a bitter enemy". He also credits her with having improved the standard of living in Kilkenny. Reverend James Graves said of her: "The fairest daughter of the Earl of Kildare was unquestionably one of the most remarkable women of her age and country". He also claims that she was the "traditional builder of nearly every castle in the district". Another chronicler considered her "a lady so politic, that nothing was thought substantially debated without her advice", while another described her as "able for wisdom to rule a realm had not her stomach overruled itself".

Margaret also developed a personal estate on her jointure lands, which eventually descended to her younger son, Richard, 1st Viscount Mountgarret.

Her husband Piers died in 1539; Margaret was the sole executor of his will. She herself died on 9 August 1542 and was buried in St Canice's Cathedral, Kilkenny alongside Piers. Their effigies are on their tomb.

== Notes and references ==
=== Sources ===
- Emerson, Lynn: "A Who's Who of Tudor Women"
- Graves, James (1857). the History, Architecture, and Antiquities of the Cathedral Church of St Canice, Kilkenny. Dublin: Hodges, Smith & Company.
- Hull, Eleanor Means (1931) [1st pub. 1926]. A History of Ireland and Her People. Vol. I. Dublin: Phoenix. OCLC 847243762. – To the Close of the Tudor Period
- Kehoe, Imelda (1992): "A History of St. Mary's Church"
- Lodge, John (1789). Archdall, Mervyn (ed.). The Peerage of Ireland or, A Genealogical History of the Present Nobility of that Kingdom. Vol. IV. Dublin: James Moore. OCLC 264906028. – Viscounts
- O'Dowd, Mary (2004). A History of Women in Ireland 1500–1800. Piersen Longman. ISBN 0-582-40429-0. – (Preview)
- Webb, Alfred (1878). Compendium of Irish Biography. Dublin. pp. 9–10. OCLC 122693688.
