= 1527 in Ireland =

- Centuries: 14th; 15th; 16th; 17th; 18th
- Decades: 1500s; 1510s; 1520s; 1530s; 1540s
- See also: Other events of 1527; List of years in Ireland

Events from the year 1527 in Ireland.

== Incumbent ==
- Lord: Henry VIII

== Events ==
- Edmond de Burca is succeeded as Mac William Iochtar by Seaán an Tearmainn Bourke.
- Edmund Butler, archbishop of Cashel, is consecrated.
- James Butler, 9th earl of Ormond, becomes Esquire of the Body to King Henry VIII.
- John Rawson, 1st and only Viscount Clontarf, is appointed commander of the light infantry of Order of St. John of Jerusalem.
- Rychard Martin is succeeded as Mayor of Galway by William Morris.

== Births ==
- March 21 – Edward Fitton, the elder, Lord President of Connaught and Thomond and the Vice-Treasurer of Ireland (died 1579).
- May 21 – Philip II of Spain, King of England and Ireland (died 1598).
- October 2 – William Drury, Lord President of Munster and Lord Justice of Ireland, is born in Hawstead, Suffolk (died 1579).
- Elizabeth FitzGerald, Countess of Lincoln, Irish noblewoman (died 1590).
- John Garvey, Protestant Bishop of Kilmore and Archbishop of Armagh (died 1595).
- John Hooker, Member of parliament for Athenry (died 1601).
- William Good, English Jesuit teacher in Limerick (died 1586).

== Deaths ==
- September 30 – Donnchadh mac Eoghan Ó Duinnshléibhe, Irish physician.
- John Rycardes, Master of the Rolls in Ireland and Dean of St Patrick's Cathedral.
