= 1521 in Ireland =

- Centuries: 14th; 15th; 16th; 17th; 18th
- Decades: 1500s; 1510s; 1520s; 1530s; 1540s
- See also: Other events of 1521; List of years in Ireland

Events from the year 1521 in Ireland.

== Incumbent ==
- Lord: Henry VIII

== Events ==
- George Cromer (died 1543) was appointed (Church of Ireland) Archbishop of Armagh and Primate of All Ireland under Henry VIII.

== Deaths ==
- 29 November – William Rokeby, a leading statesman and cleric in the early sixteenth-century, who held the offices of Bishop of Meath, Archbishop of Dublin and Lord Chancellor of Ireland.
