= William Skeffington =

English knight and official, Lord Deputy of Ireland

Sir William Skeffington (c. 1465 – 31 December 1535) was an English knight who served as Lord Deputy of Ireland.

== Early life ==
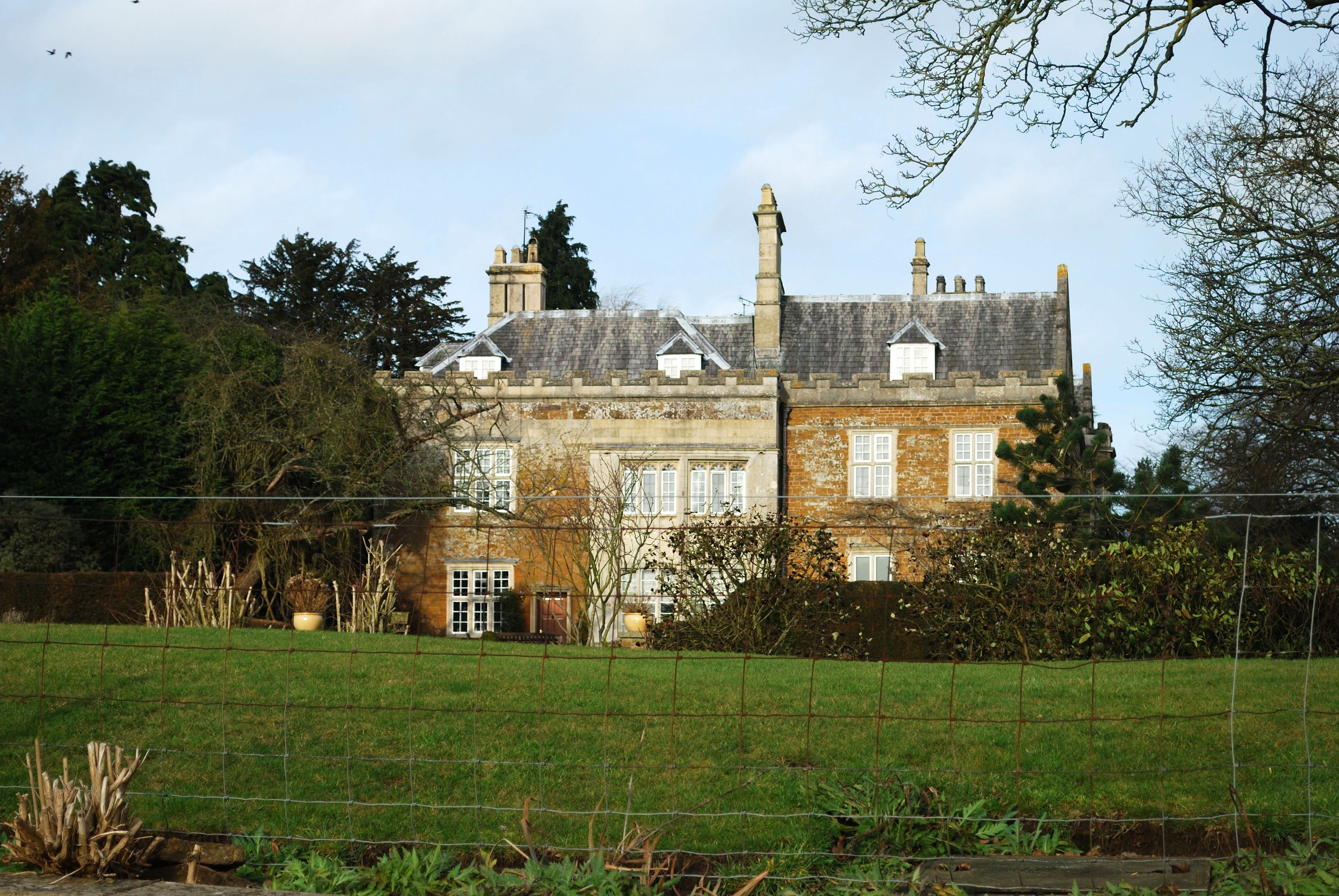
Skeffington Hall, Leicestershire

William Skeffington was born in Skeffington Hall, Leicestershire, the eldest son of Thomas Skeffington by his wife, Mary. His brother John was the patriarch of the Massareene family. He succeeded his father in 1496.

== Career ==
William was appointed High Sheriff of Leicestershire and Warwickshire for 1508, 1515 and 1521. He was knighted by King Henry VII in 1509 and appointed Master of the Ordnance from 1515 to 1534. He accompanied King Henry VIII together with other knights to the king's iconic meeting in 1520 with King Francis I of France at the Field of the Cloth of Gold. In 1523, he received from Henry VIII property near Tunbridge that had belonged to the executed traitor Henry Stafford, 2nd Duke of Buckingham and in 1529 represented Leicestershire as a knight of the shire in the English House of Commons.

He was appointed in 1529 Lord Deputy of Ireland to Henry's son, the duke of Richmond, the nominal Lord Lieutenant of Ireland. He crossed over in August 1529, but his power was so circumscribed by instructions from Henry that the head of the Fitzgeralds, Gerald, 9th earl of Kildare, and not Skeffington, was the real governor of Ireland.

In May 1531, Skeffington accepted the formal submission of the Gaelic leader Hugh Duff O'Donnell in Drogheda. This state of affairs lasted for three years, and then, in 1532, the deputy was recalled. In 1534, Kildare being in prison in England and his son Silken Thomas, being in revolt, Skeffington was again appointed Deputy, at approximately 70 years of age.

Due to his age and ill health, he was most reluctant to resume the office. He was also on the worst possible terms with his future successor as Lord Deputy, Leonard Grey, 1st Viscount Grane, and their quarrels are said to have shortened Skeffington's life.

After some delay, he landed at Dublin in October 1534, and marched at once to relieve Drogheda, but further progress in the work of crushing the rebellion was seriously delayed by his illness. However, in the spring of 1535, he was again in the field. He took Maynooth Castle, executing the entire surviving garrison. The heavy artillery used by him on this occasion earned him the surname of "The Gunner". He forced some of Kildare's allies to make peace and captured Dungarvan.

He died at Kilmainham, Dublin on 31 December 1535, and was buried in Saint Patrick's Cathedral, Dublin.

There is a monument to him in the parish church at Skeffington. He was succeeded by his eldest son, Thomas.

== Marriages ==
Skeffington married firstly Margaret Digby, daughter of Sir Everard Digby (died 1509) of Tilton, Leicestershire, by whom he had a son and heir, Thomas Skeffington.

He married secondly, Anne Digby, the daughter of Sir John Digby (died May 1533) of South Luffenham, Rutland, by Katherine (née Griffin), widow of John Bellers (died 27 January 1476), esquire, and daughter of Nicholas Griffin (died 6 June 1482), esquire, de jure Baron Latimer, by Katherine Curzon, by whom he had several children, including a son Leonard Skeffington "who served as a Lieutenant of the Tower of London, as a soldier in Ireland, and as a messenger who regularly represented his father at court". Leonard Skeffington is credited with having invented the "Scavenger's Daughter", a torture device used in the Tower during the reign of Henry VIII.

== Notes ==
Political offices
Preceded by The Earl of Kildare	Lord Deputy of Ireland; 1529–1532	Succeeded by The Earl of Kildare
Preceded by The Earl of Kildare	Lord Deputy of Ireland; 1534–1536	Succeeded by The Viscount Grane
