= 1524 in Ireland =

- Centuries: 14th; 15th; 16th; 17th; 18th
- Decades: 1500s; 1510s; 1520s; 1530s; 1540s
- See also: Other events of 1524; List of years in Ireland

Events from the year 1524 in Ireland.

== Incumbent ==
- Lord: Henry VIII

== Events ==
- June – Gerald FitzGerald, 9th Earl of Kildare was exonerated in a Royal inquiry at Christ Church, Dublin.

== Deaths ==
- Hugh O'Neill (d. 1524)
