= Viceregal throne (Ireland) =

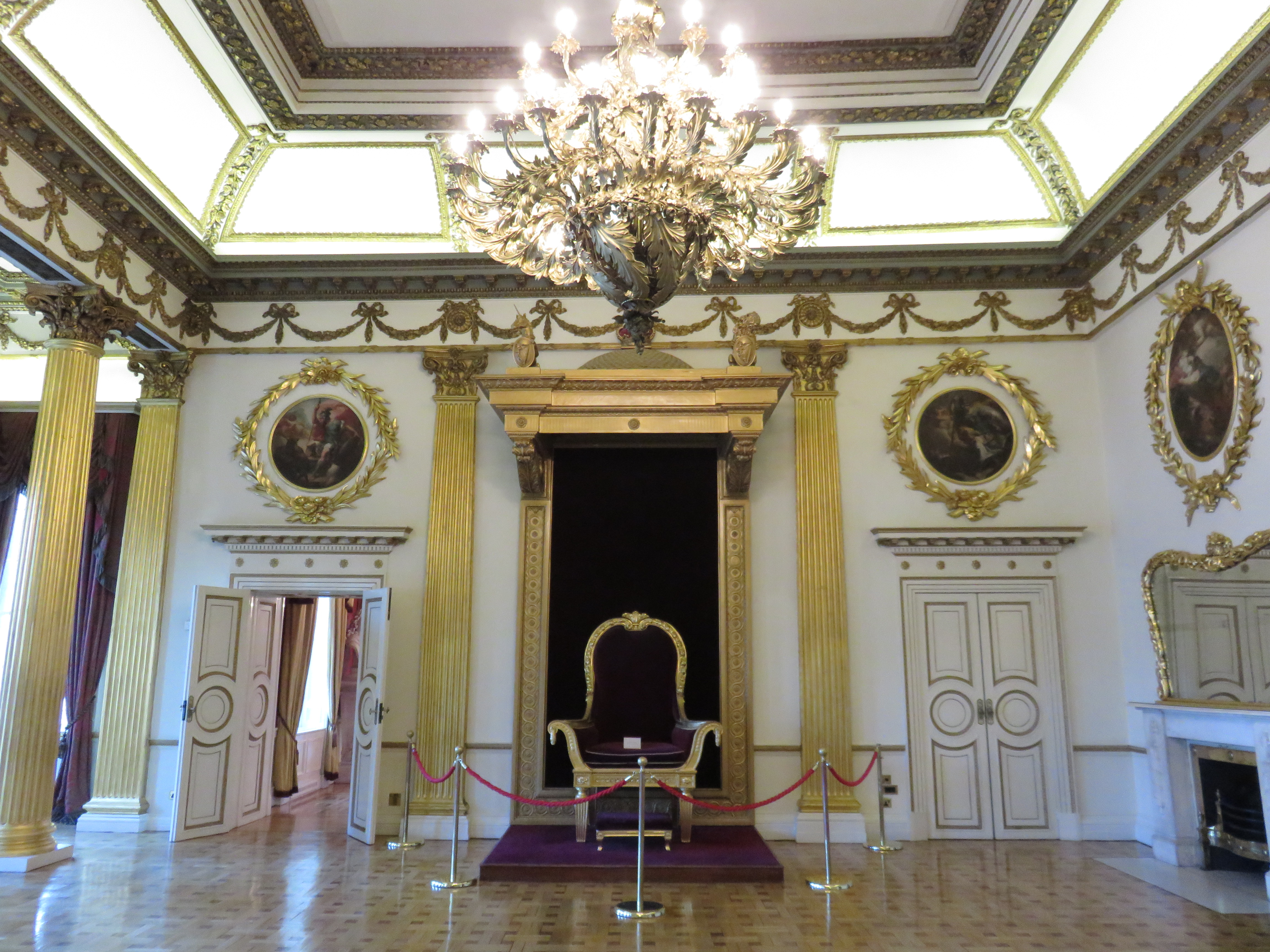

The Viceregal throne is the former throne of the Lord Lieutenant of Ireland (the title of the Viceroy of Ireland). A set of thrones, one for the Lord Lieutenant (pronounced 'Lord Lef-tenant') and one for his consort, the Vicereine, were used on state occasions in Dublin Castle. The set were photographed on a daïs in St Patrick's Hall in an image in the Lawrence Collection, now owned by the National Library of Ireland.

In 1938, the Throne, minus the crown which used to decorate its top, and with the Irish coat of arms stitched into the fabric on the chair, was used in the inauguration of Douglas Hyde as President of Ireland. The former Viceregal Throne was used in all Irish presidential inaugurations on the daïs during the ceremony in St. Patrick's Hall in Dublin Castle from 1938 to 2004.

== Symbol ==
Along with the historic Presidential Rolls-Royce, which has been used to transport Presidents-elect to all inaugurations since 1952, and the Presidential residence, Áras an Uachtaráin, the Viceregal Throne is one of the three most recognisable symbols of the otherwise low-key Presidency of Ireland. The Blue Hussars Mounted Escort, a once recognisable symbol of the Presidency, was abolished in 1948 and replaced by a motorcycle escort.

=== Replacement ===
A new Presidential Chair, designed by John Lee, was used for the first time at the inauguration of President Michael D. Higgins on 11 November 2011.
