= 1528 in Ireland =

- Centuries: 14th; 15th; 16th; 17th; 18th
- Decades: 1500s; 1510s; 1520s; 1530s; 1540s
- See also: Other events of 1528; List of years in Ireland

Events from the year 1528 in Ireland.

== Incumbent ==
- Lord: Henry VIII

== Events ==
- Conchobhar mac Toirdhealbaig Ó Briain becomes the last King of Thomond
- John Alen, Primate of Ireland appointed Lord Chancellor of Ireland

== Deaths ==
- Muiris Ó Begléighinn
- Toirdhealbhach Donn Ó Briain
