= 1523 in Ireland =

- Centuries: 14th; 15th; 16th; 17th; 18th
- Decades: 1500s; 1510s; 1520s; 1530s; 1540s
- See also: Other events of 1523; List of years in Ireland

Events from the year 1523 in Ireland.

== Incumbent ==
- Lord: Henry VIII

== Events ==
- January – Gerald FitzGerald, 9th Earl of Kildare was permitted to return to Ireland.
- Calendar of Papal Letters relating to Great Britain & Ireland, Volume XXIII, Part 1 (1523-1534) Clement VII on The Irish Manuscripts Commission (IMC)

== Births ==
- Richard Creagh Born in Limerick about 1523.
