= Maynooth Castle =

- Caisleán Má Nuad (Irish)
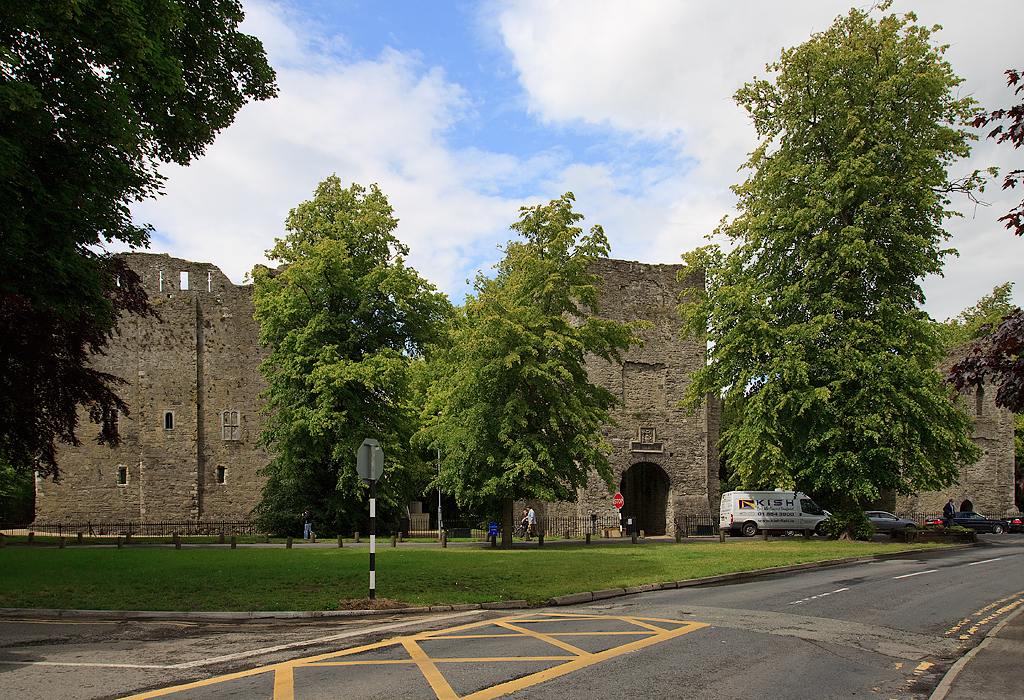
- Ruins of Maynooth Castle, Kildare

- Location within Ireland
- 53°22′51″N 6°35′40″W
- Type: Castle
- Location: Parson Street, Maynooth, County Kildare, Ireland

History
- Founder: Gerald FitzMaurice, 1st Lord of Offaly
- Built: early 13th century

Site notes
- Area: The Pale
- Architectural style: Norman

National monument of Ireland
- Official name: Maynooth Castle
- Reference no.: 485

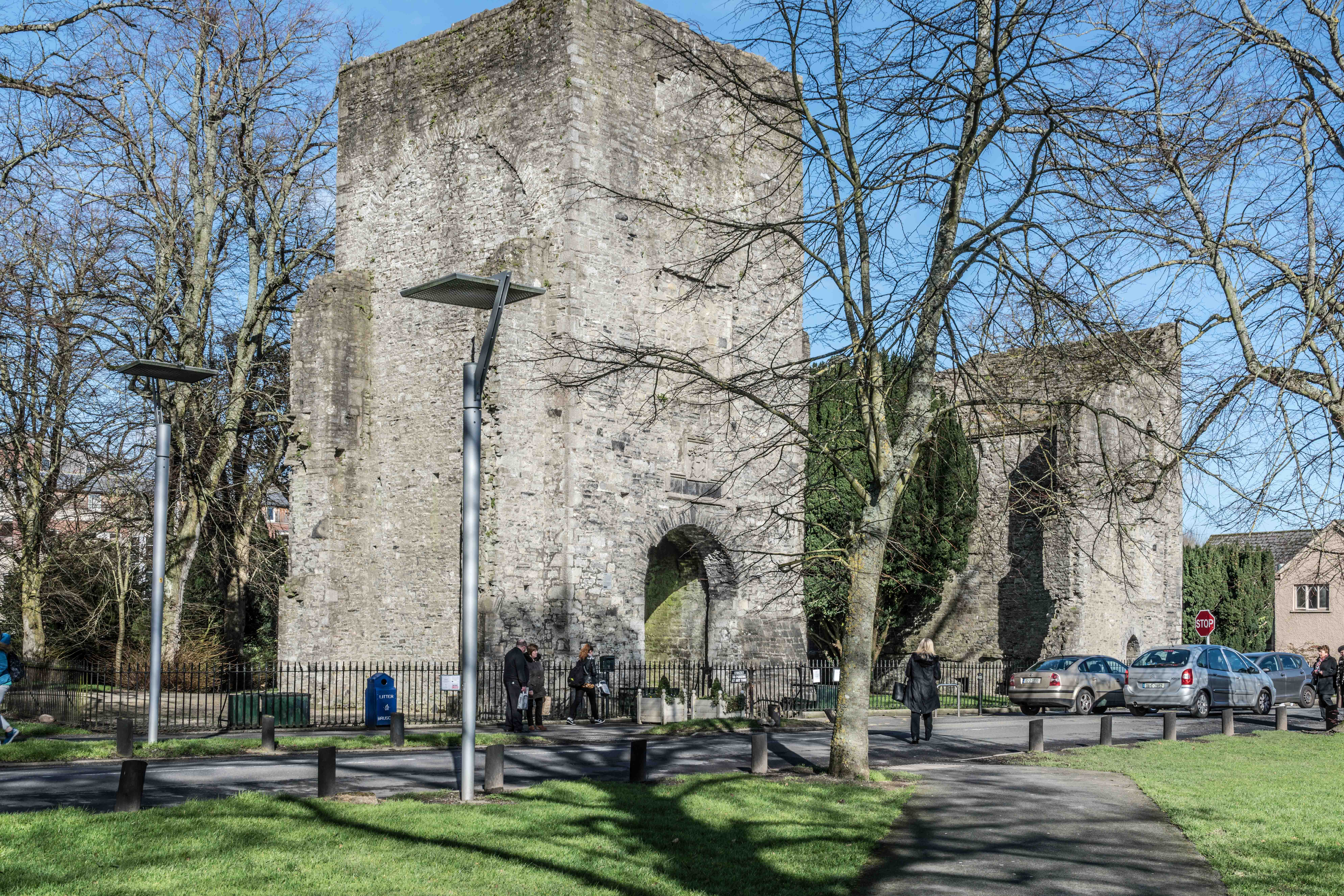
Ruins of Maynooth Castle today

Maynooth Castle is a ruined castle in Maynooth, County Kildare, Ireland which stands at the entrance to the South Campus of Maynooth University. Constructed in the early 13th century, it became the primary residence of the Kildare Fitzmaurice and Fitzgerald family.

== History ==
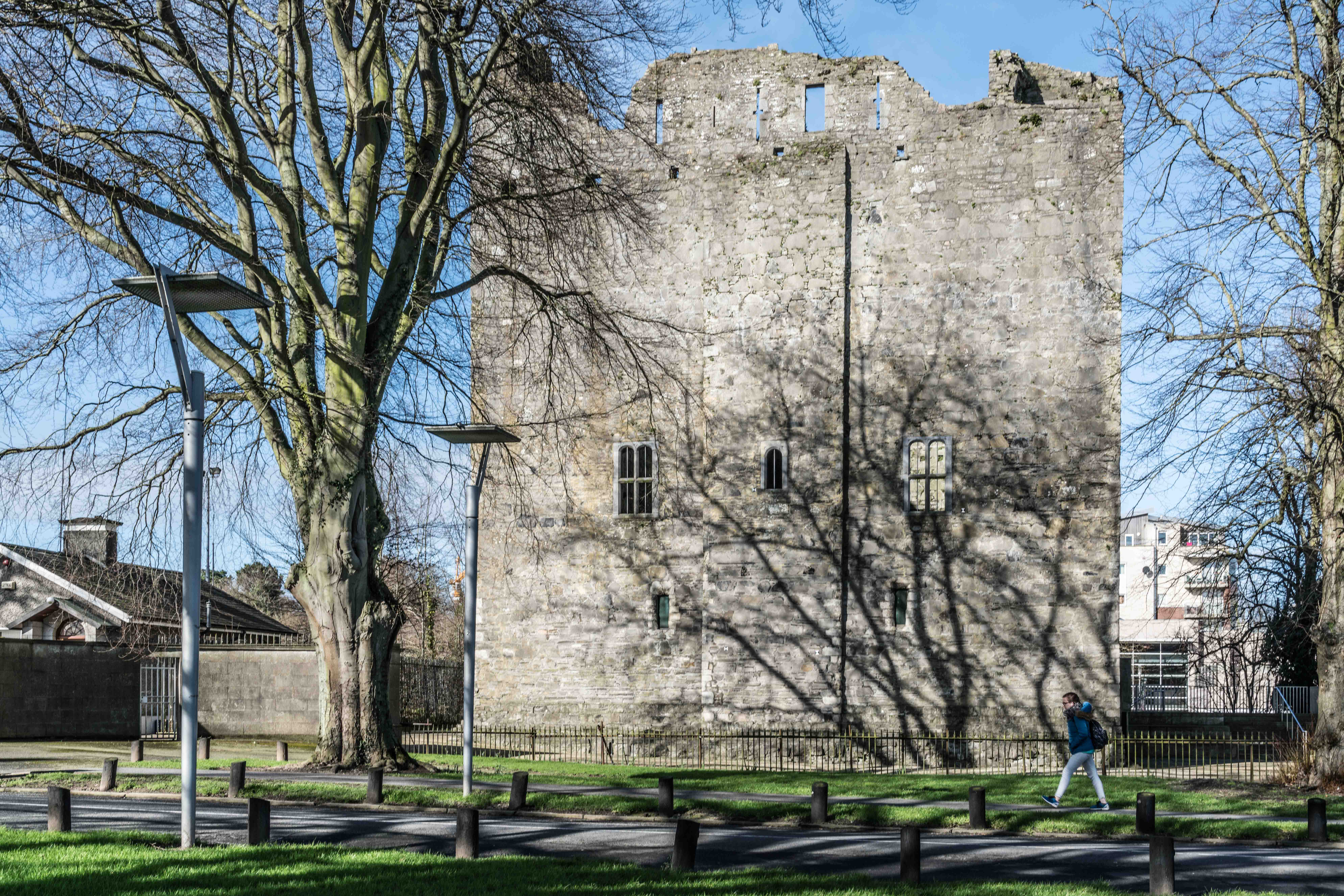
Maynooth Castle in 2016

The area covered by modern Kildare was granted by Strongbow to Maurice Fitzgerald, Lord of Llanstephan in 1176. The original keep was constructed about 1203. The castle was built by Gerald Fitzmaurice (1st Lord of Offaly), 2nd eldest son of Maurice Fitzgerald, Lord Llanstephan at the junction of two streams and became the home of the Fitzmaurice and Fitzgerald family. From then on it was expanded by Sir John Fitzgerald in the 15th century. Gerald Fitzmaurice's descendants became the Earls of Kildare and Earls of Leinster. Lords Deputy of Ireland.

The Fitzgerald occupation of the castle ended with the 1534 rebellion of Silken Thomas, the son of the ninth Earl of Kildare. An English force led by William Skeffington bombarded the massive castle in March 1535, the heavy modern siege guns of the English army making a ruin of much of the Medieval structure. The castle fell after a ten-day siege and the garrison summarily executed before the castle gate. Silken Thomas was captured shortly after and committed to the Tower of London with his five uncles. They were executed for treason at Tyburn on 3 February 1537.

The Castle was restored in 1630-35 by Richard Boyle, 1st Earl of Cork, after his daughter had married George FitzGerald, 16th Earl of Kildare but much of this building was destroyed in the 1640s during the Eleven years war. Only the gatehouse (on which united arms of the Boyles and FitzGeralds can still be viewed) and the Solar Tower survive. The Fitzgeralds left Maynooth Castle for good and made first Kilkea Castle and then Carton House their family seat.

Restoration work on the castle was restarted by the Office of Public Works in February 2000 to develop it into a Heritage Site. It is now open to the public from May to September, 10.00 a.m. - 6.00 p.m.. Today the partly ruined building remains as a tourist attraction, with limited access possible.

== Sources ==
- "Maynooth Castle". Saint Patrick's College. Archived from the original on 21 April 2012.
