= 1536 in Ireland =

- Centuries: 14th; 15th; 16th; 17th; 18th
- Decades: 1510s; 1520s; 1530s; 1540s; 1550s
- See also: Other events of 1536; List of years in Ireland

Events from the year 1536 in Ireland.

== Incumbent ==
- Lord: Henry VIII

== Events ==
- The Reformation Parliament meets in Dublin (until 1537).
- Dissolution of the Monasteries:
  - Suppression of:
    - Baltinglass Abbey.
    - Bective Abbey (6 May).
    - Duiske Abbey, Graiguenamanagh.
    - Dunbrody Abbey (6 May).
    - Newtown Trim Cathedral Priory (1 May).
    - Hospital of St John the Evangelist, Cork.
    - St John's Priory Hospital, Waterford (granted to William Wise, November).
    - St Mary de Hogges Abbey, Dublin.
    - St. Wolstan's Priory (County Kildare; 15 September).
    - Tintern Abbey (County Wexford).
  - Friaries at Clonmel, Ennis and Galbally reformed.
- Dromahair Friary burned.

== Deaths ==
- John FitzGerald, de facto 12th Earl of Desmond
- John mac Richard Mór Burke
