= 1522 in Ireland =

- Centuries: 14th; 15th; 16th; 17th; 18th
- Decades: 1500s; 1510s; 1520s; 1530s; 1540s
- See also: Other events of 1522; List of years in Ireland

Events from the year 1522 in Ireland.

== Incumbent ==
- Lord: Henry VIII

== Events ==
- Hugh Inge, Primate of Ireland appointed Lord Chancellor of Ireland.

== Births ==
- Christopher Barnewall, statesman (d. 1575)

== Deaths ==
- Thomas Rochfort (b. c. 1450) was a distinguished Irish judge and cleric who held the offices of Solicitor General for Ireland
