= 1520 in Ireland =

- Centuries: 14th; 15th; 16th; 17th; 18th
- Decades: 1500s; 1510s; 1520s; 1530s; 1540s
- See also: Other events of 1520; List of years in Ireland

Events from the year 1520 in Ireland.

== Incumbent ==
- Lord: Henry VIII
- Gerald FitzGerald, 9th Earl of Kildare continued as Lord Deputy of Ireland during the reign of Henry VIII.

== Events ==
James Fitzgerald became the 10th Earl of Desmond.

== Deaths ==
- Ulick Óge Burke, 8th lord of Clanricarde
