= 1533 in Ireland =

- Centuries: 14th; 15th; 16th; 17th; 18th
- Decades: 1510s; 1520s; 1530s; 1540s; 1550s
- See also: Other events of 1533; List of years in Ireland

Events from the year 1533 in Ireland.

== Incumbent ==
- Lord: Henry VIII

== Births ==
- Gerald FitzGerald, 15th Earl of Desmond, Irish aristocrat and leader of the Desmond Rebellions of 1579 (d. 1583)

== Deaths ==
- Phelim Bacagh O'Neill
