= Lord Lieutenant of Ireland =

Title of the chief governor of Ireland from 1690 to 1922

- Standard of the Lord Lieutenant from 1801 onward.
- Style: The Right Honourable as a member of the Privy Council of the United Kingdom
- Residence: Dublin Castle
- Appointer: Lord of Ireland Monarch of Ireland Monarch of the United Kingdom
- Term length: At the Sovereign's pleasure
- Formation: 1171
- Final holder: The Viscount FitzAlan of Derwent
- Abolished: 8 December 1922
- Succession: Governor of Northern Ireland and Governor-General of the Irish Free State

Lord Lieutenant of Ireland (UK: /lɛfˈtɛnənt/ (Note: Irish translations of the title include Fear Ionad, Fear Ionaid an Rí, or Ard-Leifteanant.)), or more formally Lieutenant General and General Governor of Ireland, was the title of the chief governor of Ireland from the Williamite Wars of 1690 until the Partition of Ireland in 1922. This spanned the Kingdom of Ireland (1541–1800) and the United Kingdom of Great Britain and Ireland (1801–1922). The office, under its various names, was often more generally known as the viceroy, and his wife was known as the vicereine. The government of Ireland in practice was usually in the hands of the Lord Deputy up to the 17th century, and later of the Chief Secretary for Ireland.

== Role ==
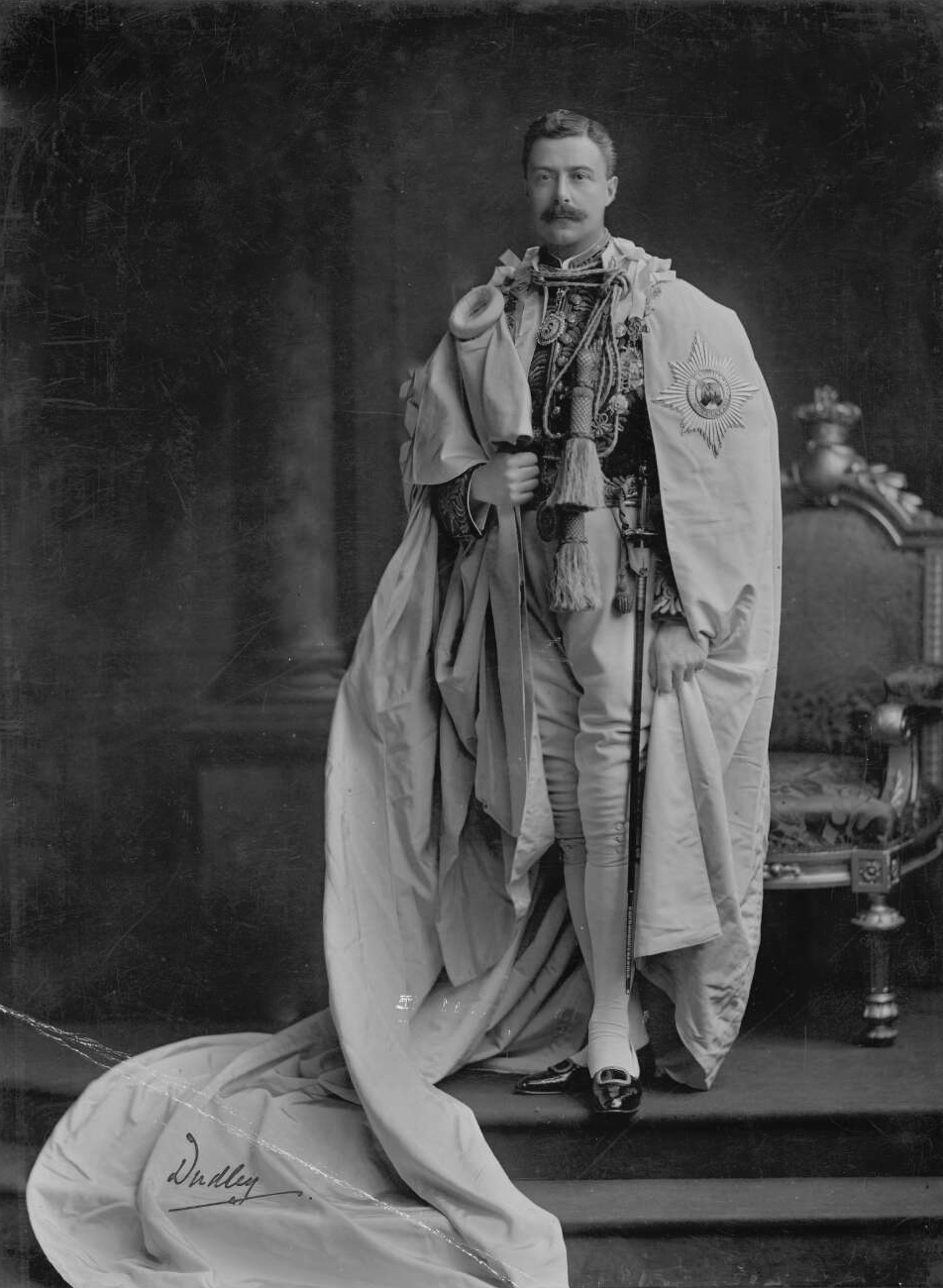
The Lord Lieutenant of Ireland was the ex officio Grand Master of the Order of St Patrick (uniform shown here worn by William Ward, 2nd Earl of Dudley, Lord Lieutenant from 1902 to 1905).

The Lord Lieutenant possessed a number of overlapping roles. He was

- the representative of the King (the "viceroy");
- the head of the executive in Ireland, though in practice this role was exercised by the Chief Secretary for Ireland from the late 18th century onwards;
- (on occasion) a member of the English or British Cabinet;
- the fount of mercy, justice and patronage;
- (on occasion) commander-in-chief in Ireland.
- Grand Master of the Order of St. Patrick

Prior to the Act of Union 1800 which abolished the Irish parliament, the Lord Lieutenant formally delivered the Speech from the Throne outlining his Government's policies. His Government exercised effective control of parliament through the extensive exercise of the powers of patronage, namely the awarding of peerages, baronetcies and state honours. Critics accused successive viceroys of using their patronage power as a corrupt means of controlling parliament. On one day in July 1777, Lord Buckinghamshire as Lord Lieutenant promoted 5 viscounts to earls, 7 barons to viscounts, and created 18 new barons. The power of patronage was used to bribe MPs and peers into supporting the Act of Union 1800, with many of those who changed sides and supported the Union in Parliament awarded peerages and honours for doing so.

== Constitutional structure ==
The Lord Lieutenant was advised in the governance by the Irish Privy Council, a body of appointed figures and hereditary title holders, which met in the Council Chamber in Dublin Castle and on occasion in other locations. The chief constitutional figures in the viceregal court were:

- Chief Secretary for Ireland: From 1660, originally the chief of operations, but by the 19th century the effective top official, with the Lord Lieutenant becoming a semi-ceremonial position.
- Under-Secretary for Ireland: The head of the Irish civil service and the most senior career official at Dublin Castle.
- Lord Justices: Three office-holders who acted in the Lord Lieutenant's stead during his absence. The Lord Justices were before 1800 the Lord Chancellor of Ireland, the Speaker of the Irish House of Commons, and the Church of Ireland Archbishop of Armagh as Primate of All Ireland.

Lords Lieutenant were appointed for no set term but served for "His/Her Majesty's pleasure" (after 1688, really the pleasure of the Cabinet). When a ministry fell, the Lord Lieutenant was usually replaced by a supporter of the new ministry.

== Officeholders ==
Until the 16th century, Anglo-Irish noblemen such as the 8th Earl of Kildare and the 9th Earl of Kildare traditionally held the post of Justiciar or Lord Deputy. From the Tudor reconquest of Ireland the post was increasingly given to Englishmen, whose loyalty to the Crown was not doubted.

Although it was the faith of the overwhelming majority on the island of Ireland, Roman Catholics were excluded from being able to hold the office from Glorious Revolution in 1688 until the Government of Ireland Act 1920.

Until 1767 Lords Lieutenant did not live full-time in Ireland. Instead they resided in Ireland during meetings of the Irish Parliament (a number of months every two years). However the British cabinet decided in 1765 that full-time residency should be required to allow the Lord Lieutenant to keep a close eye on Irish affairs; this led to the Chief Secretary for Ireland becoming the effective "Ireland minister" at Westminster.

== Importance of the post ==
The post ebbed and flowed in importance, being used on occasion as a form of exile for prominent British politicians who had fallen afoul of the Court of St. James's or Westminster. On other occasions it was a stepping stone to a future career. Two Lords Lieutenant, Lord Hartington and the Duke of Portland, went from Dublin Castle to 10 Downing Street as Prime Minister of Great Britain, in 1756 and 1783 respectively.

By the mid-to-late 19th century the post had declined from being a powerful political office to that of being a symbolic quasi-monarchical figure who reigned, not ruled, over the Irish administration. Instead it was the Chief Secretary for Ireland who became central, with him, not the Lord Lieutenant, sitting on occasion in the British cabinet.

== Official residence ==
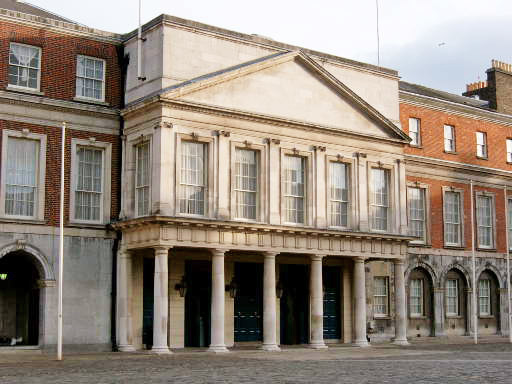
The Viceregal Apartments in Dublin Castle – the official 'season' residence of the Lord Lieutenant

The official residence of the Lord Lieutenant was the Viceregal Apartments in Dublin Castle, where the Viceregal Court was based. Other summer or alternative residences used by Lord Lieutenant or Lords Deputy included Abbeville in Kinsealy, Chapelizod House, in which the Lord Lieutenant lived while Dublin Castle was being rebuilt following a fire but which he left due to the building being supposedly haunted, Leixlip Castle and St. Wolstan's in Celbridge. The Geraldine Lords Deputy, the 8th Earl of Kildare and the 9th Earl of Kildare, being native Irish, both lived in, among other locations, their castle in Maynooth, County Kildare. Lord Essex owned Durhamstown Castle near Navan in County Meath, a short distance from the residence of the Lord Bishop of Meath at Ardbraccan House.

The decision to require the Lord Lieutenant to live full-time in Ireland necessitated a change in living arrangements. As the location of the Viceregal Court, the Privy Council and of various governmental offices, Dublin Castle became a less than desirable full-time residence for the viceroy, vicereine and their family. In 1781 the British government bought the former ranger's house in Phoenix Park to act as a personal residence for the Lord Lieutenant. The building was rebuilt and named the Viceregal Lodge. It was not however until major renovations in the 1820s that the Lodge came to be used regularly by viceroys. It is now known as Áras an Uachtaráin and is the residence of the President of Ireland.

By the mid-19th century, Lords Lieutenant lived in the Castle only during the Social Season (early January to St. Patrick's Day, 17 March), during which time they held social events; balls, drawing rooms, etc. By tradition the coat of arms of each Lord Lieutenant was displayed somewhere in the Chapel Royal in Dublin Castle; some were incorporated into stained glass windows, some carved into seating, etc.

== Irish attitudes ==
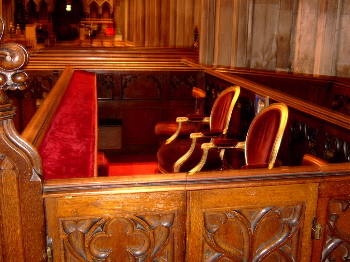
The Viceregal pew in St Patrick's Cathedral, Dublin

The office of Lord Lieutenant, like the British government in Ireland, was greatly resented by most Irish nationalists, though it was supported with varying degrees of enthusiasm by the minority Irish unionist community. Some Lords Lieutenant did earn a measure of popularity in a personal capacity among nationalists. From the early 19th century, calls were made frequently for the abolition of the office and its replacement by a Secretary of State for Ireland, similar to the Secretary of State for Scotland. A bill to effect this change was introduced in Parliament in 1850 by the government of Lord John Russell but was subsequently withdrawn when it became clear that it would receive insufficient support to pass. The office survived until the establishment of the Irish Free State in 1922.

Irish nationalists throughout the 19th century and early 20th century campaigned for a form of Irish self-government. Daniel O'Connell sought repeal of the Act of Union, while later nationalists such as Charles Stewart Parnell sought a lesser measure, known as home rule. All four Home Rule bills provided for the continuation of the office, typically with a ceremonial role as the monarch's representative in Ireland, similar to the Governor General of Canada or Australia.

== Abolition ==
The Government of Ireland Act 1920 divided Ireland into two devolved entities inside the United Kingdom, Northern Ireland and Southern Ireland. Two institutions were meant to join the two; a Council of Ireland (which was hoped would evolve into a working all-Ireland parliament) and the Lord Lieutenant who would be the nominal chief executive of both regimes, appointing both prime ministers and dissolving both parliaments. In fact only Northern Ireland functioned, with Southern Ireland being quickly replaced by the Irish Free State with its own Governor-General. The Irish Free State (Consequential Provisions) Act 1922 provided that, once the Parliament of Northern Ireland opted out of the Free State, the office of Lord Lieutenant of Ireland would be abolished and its remaining powers transferred to the new position of Governor of Northern Ireland. This duly happened on 8 December 1922, two days after the Free State Constitution came into force.

== See also ==
- Constitution of 1782
- Governor of Northern Ireland
- Governor-General of the Irish Free State
- Dublin Castle administration in Ireland
- Monarchy of Ireland
- Penal Laws
- Poynings' Law (on certification of acts)
- Viceregal throne (Ireland)
