= 1530 in Ireland =

- Centuries: 14th; 15th; 16th; 17th; 18th
- Decades: 1510s; 1520s; 1530s; 1540s; 1550s
- See also: Other events of 1530; List of years in Ireland

Events from the year 1530 in Ireland.

== Incumbent ==
- Lord: Henry VIII

== Events ==
- September – John Óge Kirwan (a.k.a. Jhonock Kirwan) becomes Mayor of Galway.

== Deaths ==
- Richard Mór Burke 9th lord of Clanricarde
