= 1525 in Ireland =

- Centuries: 14th; 15th; 16th; 17th; 18th
- Decades: 1500s; 1510s; 1520s; 1530s; 1540s
- See also: Other events of 1525; List of years in Ireland

Events from the year 1525 in Ireland.

== Incumbent ==
- Lord: Henry VIII

== Births ==
- Gerald FitzGerald, 11th Earl of Kildare (d. 1585)
