= 1526 in Ireland =

- Centuries: 14th; 15th; 16th; 17th; 18th
- Decades: 1500s; 1510s; 1520s; 1530s; 1540s
- See also: Other events of 1526; List of years in Ireland

Events from the year 1526 in Ireland.

== Incumbent ==
- Lord: Henry VIII

== Births ==
- Edmund Tanner (d. 1579 in Ireland), Irish Jesuit, Roman Catholic Bishop of Cork and Cloyne, from 1574 to 1579.

== Deaths ==
- Nicholas St Lawrence, 4th Baron Howth, Irish soldier and statesman of the early Tudor period.
