= James Butler of Polestown =

Irish noble (died 1487)

Sir James Butler of Polestown (died 1487) was a warlord in Yorkist Ireland.

== Career ==
James was the eldest son of Sir Edmund MacRichard Butler, whom he succeeded in 1464 as Lord Deputy of Ireland over his absentee cousins John and Thomas, the 6th and 7th Earls of Ormond, respectively. As was his family's tradition, he had a long career as a Gaelic warlord which included raiding and rustling across southern Leinster. He sided with the House of Lancaster against King Edward IV of England, for which he was attainted; but when that King was settled on the throne, he overlooked this mistake in his conduct, and an Act of Parliament passed in Ireland repealed all attainders, judgments, and outlawries against him.

In April 1468, the king granted him, in recognition of his service, the manor and advowson of Callan for life. On 12 October 1477, John Butler, Earl of Ormond, appointed him as his attorney and deputy to administer Ormond's lands in Ireland. In this capacity, he oversaw reforms in the town of Carrick-on-Suir. He was later knighted and is credited with building the castle of Neigham (also recorded as Nehorn) near Gowran.

== Death ==
He died on 16 April 1487 and was buried in Callan Augustinian Friary, of which he was the founder.

== Marriage and Children ==
Around 1450 he began a love affair with Sabh Kavanagh. Her parents were Donal Reagh MacMurrough-Kavanagh (a.k.a. Domhnall mac Gerald MacMurrough-Kavanagh), King of Leinster and an unknown daughter of an O'Nolan chieftain. Three children were born before James and Sabh were married. James later arranged for the Irish Parliament to declare them legitimate.

- Edmund Butler of Polestown
- Theobald Butler of Polestown
- John FitzJames Butler of Polestown whose only daughter and heir, Margaret, was married to Edmond Blanchville of Blanchvillestown, county Kilkenny.
- Alice Butler (or Ellice) the first wife of Sir George Fleming of Stephenstown, second son of James Fleming, 7th Baron Slane: she was mother of James, who by his wife Ismay, daughter of the Lord Chief Justice of Ireland, Sir Bartholomew Dillon of Riverstown, was the father of Thomas Fleming, 10th Baron Slane.
- Margaret, who married as his second wife Sir Alexander Plunket, Lord Chancellor of Ireland, and had issue.
- Piers Butler, 8th Earl of Ormond and 1st Earl of Ossory (1467–1539), also known as (Irish Piers Ruadh) Red Piers.

== See also ==
- Butler dynasty
