= Piers Butler, 8th Earl of Ormond =

Irish earl (1467–1539)

Piers Butler
- Earl of Ormond
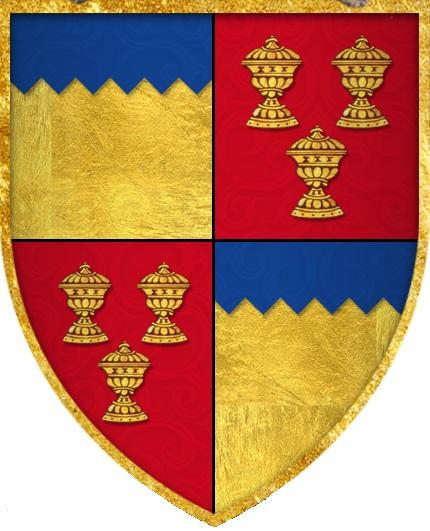
- Tenure: 1515–1539
- Predecessor: Thomas, 7th Earl of Ormond
- Successor: James, 9th Earl of Ormond
- Born: 1467
- Died: 26 August 1539 (aged 71–72)
- Noble family: Butler
- Spouse: Margaret FitzGerald
- Issue Detail: James, Richard, & others. Edmund (illegitimate)
- Father: Sir James Butler
- Mother: Sabh Kavanaugh

Piers Butler, 8th Earl of Ormond, 1st Earl of Ossory (c. 1467 – 26 August 1539) also known as Red Piers (Irish: Piers Ruadh), was from the Polestown branch of the Butler family of Ireland. In the succession crisis at the death of Thomas Butler, 7th Earl of Ormond he succeeded to the earldom as heir male, but lost the title in 1528 to Thomas Boleyn. He regained it after Boleyn's death in 1538.

Family tree

Piers Butler with wife, parents, and other selected relatives, among which the Boleyns. (Note: This family tree is based on two family trees: the condensed Butler family tree in Dunboyne and the one illustrating the succession of the 7th Earl of Ormond; and on genealogies of the earls of Desmond and Ormond.)

James; 3rd Earl; Ormond c. 1395 – 1405	Anne; Welles d. 1397
James; 4th Earl c. 1393 – 1452	Joan; Beauchamp; 1396–1430	Richard; Butler; 1396–1443	Catherine; O'Reilly; 1395–1420
James; 5th Earl; 1420–1461	John; 6th Earl d. 1476	Thomas; 7th Earl; 1426–1515	Edmund; MacRichard; Butler; 1420–1464	Catherine; O'Carroll d. 1506
William; Boleyn; 1451 – 1505	Margaret; Butler c. 1454 – c. 1539	James; Butler d. 1487 of Polestown	Sabh; Kavanagh
Thomas; Boleyn c. 1477 – 1536	Piers; 8th Earl; 1467–1539	Margaret; FitzGerald c. 1473 – 1542	James; 10th Earl; Desmond d. 1529
Anne; Boleyn; 1501 or 1507 – 1536	James; 9th Earl; 1496–1546	Joan; FitzGerald d. 1565
Thomas; 10th Earl c. 1531 – 1614; Black Tom	Elizabeth; Sheffield	John of Kilcash d. 1570	Katherine; MacCarthy

Legend

XXX	Subject of the article	XXX	Earls of Ormond	XXX	Earls of Desmond

== Birth and origins ==
Piers was born c. 1467, the third son of James Butler and Sabh Kavanagh. His father was Lord Deputy of Ireland, Lord of the Manor of Advowson of Callan (1438–1487). His father's family was the Polestown cadet branch of the Butler dynasty that had started with Sir Richard Butler of Polestown, second son of James Butler, 3rd Earl of Ormond.

His mother, whose first name is variously given as Sabh, Sadhbh, Saiv, or Sabina, was a princess of Leinster, eldest daughter of Donal Reagh Kavanagh, MacMurrough (1396–1476), King of Leinster.

== Marriage and children ==
In 1485, Butler married Lady Margaret FitzGerald, daughter of Gerald fitz Maurice FitzGerald, 8th Earl of Kildare and Alison FitzEustace. The marriage was political; arranged with the purpose of healing the breach between the two families. In the early years of their marriage, Margaret and her husband were reduced to penury by James Dubh Butler, a nephew, heir to the earldom and agent of the absentee 7th Earl, who resided in England. Piers Butler retaliated by murdering James Dubh in an ambush in 1497. He was pardoned for his crime on 22 February 1498.

Piers and Margaret had three sons:

1. James (1496–1546), also called "the Lame", who succeeded him as the 9th Earl and married Lady Joan FitzGerald, daughter and heiress of James FitzGerald, 10th Earl of Desmond
2. Richard (1500–1571), who became the 1st Viscount Mountgarret and married his first cousin Eleanor Butler, daughter of his uncle Theobald Butler
3. Thomas, who was slain by Dermoid Mac Shane, MacGillaPatrick of Upper Ossory, and left an only daughter Margaret, who was first married to Rory Caoch O'More of Laois and secondly to Sir Maurice Fitzgerald of Lackagh

–and six daughters:

1. Margaret, married firstly to Thomas, second son of the Earl of Desmond, and secondly to Barnaby Fitzpatrick, 1st Baron Upper Ossory and had issue.
2. Catherine (1506–1553) married 1stly Richard Power, 1st Baron Power, of Curraghmore (died 1535) and 2ndly James FitzGerald, 13th Earl of Desmond.
3. Joan (born 1528), married James Butler, 10th Baron Dunboyne
4. Ellice (1481–1530). Married firstly to MacMorrish; and secondly in 1503 to Gerald Fitzgerald, 3rd Lord Decies (1482–1533), grandson of James FitzGerald, 6th Earl of Desmond.
5. Eleanor, married Thomas Butler, 1st Baron Cahir
6. Helen, also called Ellen (1523–1597), married Donough O'Brien, 2nd Earl of Thomond, son of Conor O'Brien, Prince of Thomond, and Annabell de Burgh

The Earl had an illegitimate son, Edmund Butler, who became Archbishop of Cashel and conformed to the established religion in 1539.

== Claims to the title ==
During the prolonged absence from Ireland of the earls, his father Sir James Butler (died 1487) had laid claim to the Ormond land and titles. This had precipitated a crisis in the Ormond succession when the seventh earl later died without a male heir. On 20 March 1489, King Henry VII appointed him High Sheriff of County Kilkenny. He was knighted before September 1497. The following year (1498) he seized Kilkenny Castle and with his wife, Margaret FitzGerald (died 1542), the dynamic daughter of the earl of Kildare, probably improved the living accommodation there. On 28 February 1498 he received a pardon for crimes committed in Ireland, including the murder of James Ormonde, heir to the 7th Earl. He was also made Seneschal of the Liberty of Tipperary on 21 June 1505, succeeding his distant relation, James Butler, 9th Baron Dunboyne.

Henry VII was succeeded by Henry VIII in 1509. On the death of Thomas Butler, 7th Earl of Ormonde on 3 August 1515, Piers Butler became the 8th Earl of Ormond.

In March 1522, Henry VIII appointed him Chief Governor of Ireland as Lord Deputy; he held this office until August 1524 when he was succeeded by Thomas FitzGerald, 10th Earl of Kildare. However, he held on to the position of Lord Treasurer.

=== Loss of title ===
One of the heirs general to the Ormond inheritance was Thomas Boleyn, whose mother was Margaret Butler, second daughter of the 7th earl. Thomas Boleyn was the father of Anne, whose star was rising at the court of King Henry VIII of England. As the king wanted the titles of Ormond and Wiltshire for Thomas Boleyn, he induced Butler and his coheirs to resign their claims on 17 February 1528. Aided by the king's Chancellor, Cardinal Thomas Wolsey, Butler was created Earl of Ossory instead.

=== Restoration of title ===
On 22 February 1538, the earldom of Ormond was restored to him.

== Death and timeline ==
He died on 26 August 1539 and was buried in St Canice's Cathedral, Kilkenny.

Timeline
As his birth date is uncertain, so are all his ages. Italics for historical background.
Age	Date	Event
0	About 1467	Born
17–18	22 Aug 1485	Accession of Henry VII, succeeding Richard III of England
17–18	1485	Married Lady Margaret FitzGerald
28–29	1496	Eldest son born
41–42	22 Apr 1509	Accession of Henry VIII, succeeding Henry VII of England
60–61	18 Feb 1528	Resigned the earldom of Ormond
62–63	1530	Eldest son married Lady Joan Fitzgerald
70–71	Feb 1538	Regained the earldom of Ormond.
71–72	26 Aug 1539	Died

== Ancestry ==
Ancestors of Piers Butler, 8th Earl of Ormond

James Butler, 3rd Earl of Ormond
Sir Richard Butler of Polestown
Anne Welles
Edmund MacRichard Butler
Gildus O'Reilly
Catherine O'Reilly
James Butler of Polestown
Maelrony O'Carroll
Catherine O'Carroll
Piers Butler
Donald Reagh Mac Murrough Cavenagh
Sabina Cavenagh

== See also ==
- Butler dynasty
- Ashfield Gales

== Notes and references ==
=== Sources ===
- Bagwell, Richard (1885). Ireland under the Tudors. Vol. I. London: Longmans, Green, and Co. OCLC 761857292. – 1534 to 1558
- Beresford, David (October 2009). "Butler, Piers ('Piers Ruadh')". In McGuire, James; Quinn, James (eds.). Dictionary of Irish Biography (online ed.).
- Burke, Bernard (1883). A Genealogical History of the Dormant, Abeyant, Forfeited and Extinct Peerages of the British Empire (New ed.). London: Harrison. OCLC 499232768.
- Burke, Bernard; Burke, Ashworth Peter (1915). A Genealogical and Heraldic History of the Peerage and Baronetage, the Privy Council, Knightage and Companionage (77th ed.). London: Harrison. OCLC 1155471554.
- Cokayne, George Edward (1895). Complete Peerage of England, Scotland, Ireland, Great Britain and the United Kingdom, Extant, Extinct, or Dormant. Vol. VI (1st ed.). London: George Bell and Sons. OCLC 1180818801. – N to R (for Ormond)
- Duffy, Damien (2021). Aristocratic Women in Ireland, 1450-1660: The Ormond Family, Power and Politics. Woodbridge, Suffolk: The Boydell Press. ISBN 978-1-78327-593-9.
- Dunboyne (1968). Butler Family History (2nd ed.). Kilkenny: Rothe House.
- Edwards, David (2003). The Ormond Lordship in County Kilkenny: the rise and fall of Butler feudal power. Dublin: Four Courts Press. ISBN 1-85182-578-9. – (Snippet view)
- Edwards, David (1998). The Ormond Lordship in County Kilkenny, 1515–1642 (Ph.D.). Dublin: Trinity College. hdl:2262/77139. – (PDF downloadable from given URL)
- Fryde, E. B.; Greenway, D. E.; Porter, S.; Roy, I., eds. (1986). Handbook of British Chronology. Royal Historical Society Guides and Handbooks, No. 2 (3rd ed.). London: Offices of the Royal Historical Society. ISBN 0-86193-106-8. – (for timeline)
- Graves, James (1857). The History, Architecture, and Antiquities of the Cathedral Church of St Canice, Kilkenny. Dublin: Hodges, Smith & Company.
- Hull, Eleanor Means (1926) [1st pub. 1926]. A History of Ireland and Her People To the Close of the Tudor Period. Vol. I. London: George G. Harrap & Company. OCLC 903883528. – To the Close of the Tudor Period (date of reprint unknown)
- Lodge, John (1789). Archdall, Mervyn (ed.). The Peerage of Ireland or, A Genealogical History of the Present Nobility of that Kingdom. Vol. IV. Dublin: James Moore. OCLC 264906028. – Viscounts
- Wright, Stephen (2004). "Butler, James, ninth earl of Ormond and second earl of Ossory (b in or after 1496, d. 1546)". In Matthew, Henry Colin Gray.; Harrison, Brian (eds.). Oxford Dictionary of National Biography. Vol. 9. New York: Oxford University Press. pp. 151–153. ISBN 0-19-861359-8.

Peerage of Ireland
Preceded by Thomas Butler	Earl of Ormond; 1538–1539	Succeeded by James Butler
New creation	Earl of Ossory; 1528–1539	Succeeded by James Butler
