= Maynooth =

University town in County Kildare, Ireland

Maynooth Maigh Nuad
- Town
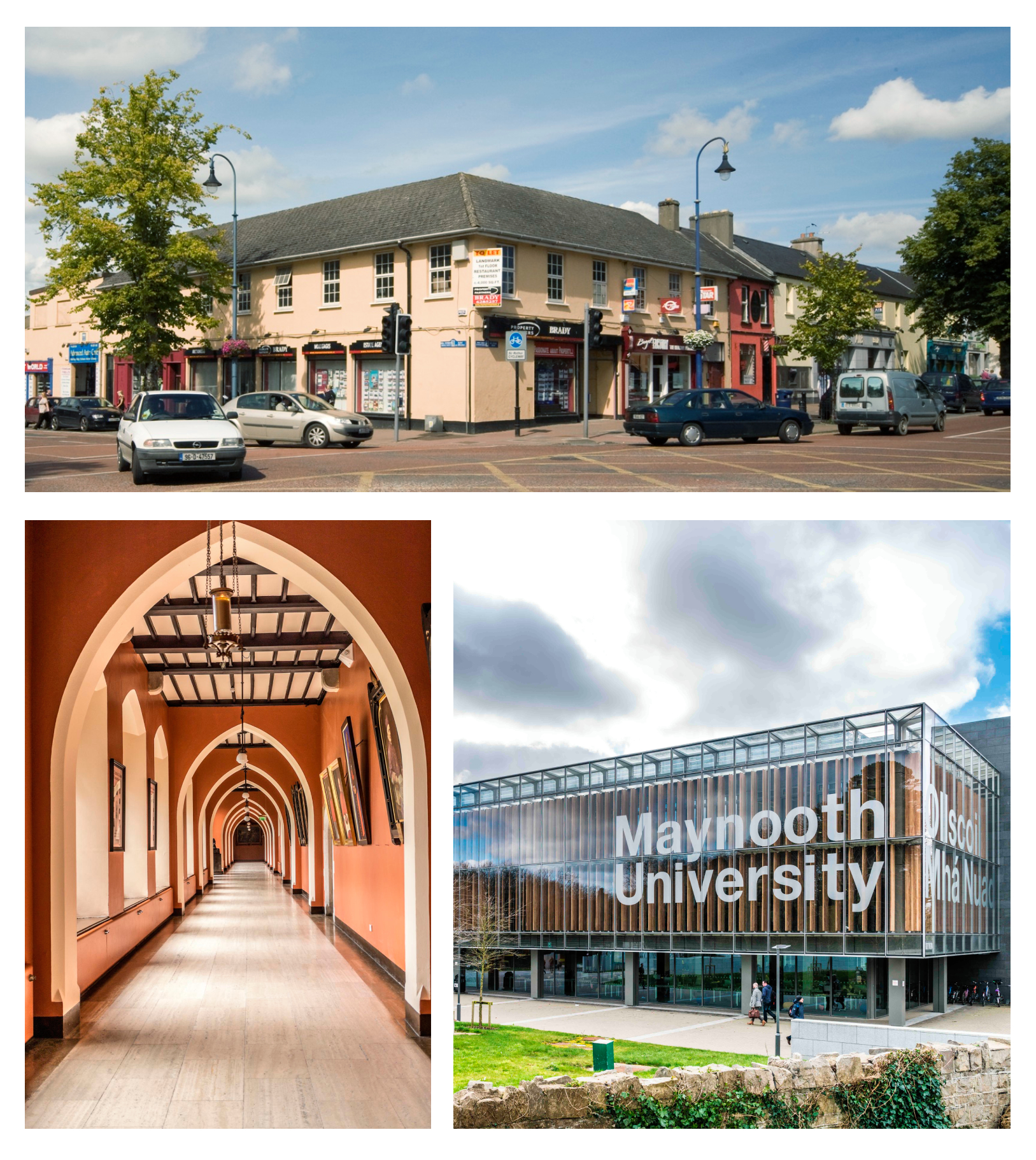
- Clockwise from top: businesses in Maynooth, the Maynooth campus of the National University of Ireland, St. Patrick's College
- Motto: Crom Abu
- Location in Ireland
- Coordinates: 53.38157°N 6.59098°W
- Country: Ireland
- Province: Leinster
- County: County Kildare
- Established: 1176
- Elevation: 48 m (157 ft)

Population (2022)
  - Total: 17,259
- Eircode routing key: W23
- Telephone area code: 01
- Website: maynooth.ie

Maynooth (/məˈnuːθ/; Irish: Maigh Nuad) is a university town in north County Kildare, Ireland. It is home to Maynooth University (part of the National University of Ireland and also known as the National University of Ireland, Maynooth) and St Patrick's College, a Pontifical University and Ireland's sole Roman Catholic seminary. Maynooth is also the seat of the Irish Catholic Bishops' Conference and holds the headquarters of Ireland's largest development charity, Trócaire. Maynooth is located 24 kilometres (15 miles) west of central Dublin.

== Location and access ==
Maynooth is located on the R148 road between Leixlip and Kilcock, with the M4 motorway bypassing the town. Other roads connect the town to Celbridge, Clane, and Dunboyne. Maynooth is also on the Dublin-Sligo railway line and is served by the Commuter and InterCity train services.

== Etymology ==
Maynooth comes from Irish Maigh Nuadhat or Maigh Nuadhad, meaning "plain of Nuadha". Maigh Nuad is the modern spelling. Nuadha was one of the gods of the ancient Irish, corresponding to Nudd of Wales and Nodens of ancient Britain and Gaul.

== History ==
=== Historical governance ===
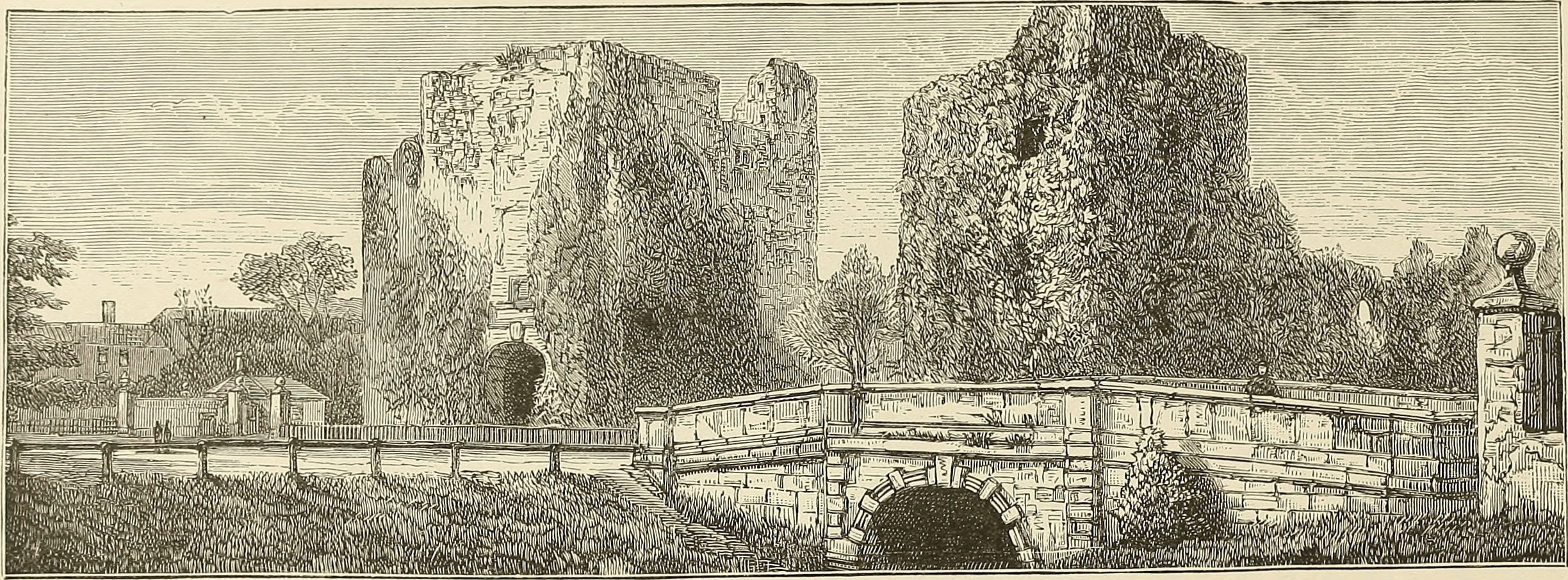
Maynooth Castle, 1885

Maynooth was a long-term centre for the Geraldine or FitzGerald family, which dominated Irish affairs during the Anglo-Norman and Tudor periods.

From 1932 to 1937, the town was the unofficial home to the King's representative in Ireland, Governor General Domhnall Ua Buachalla, who declined to take up official residence in the Viceregal Lodge in the Phoenix Park, and whose family operated a hardware store in the town until 2005.

=== Historical features ===
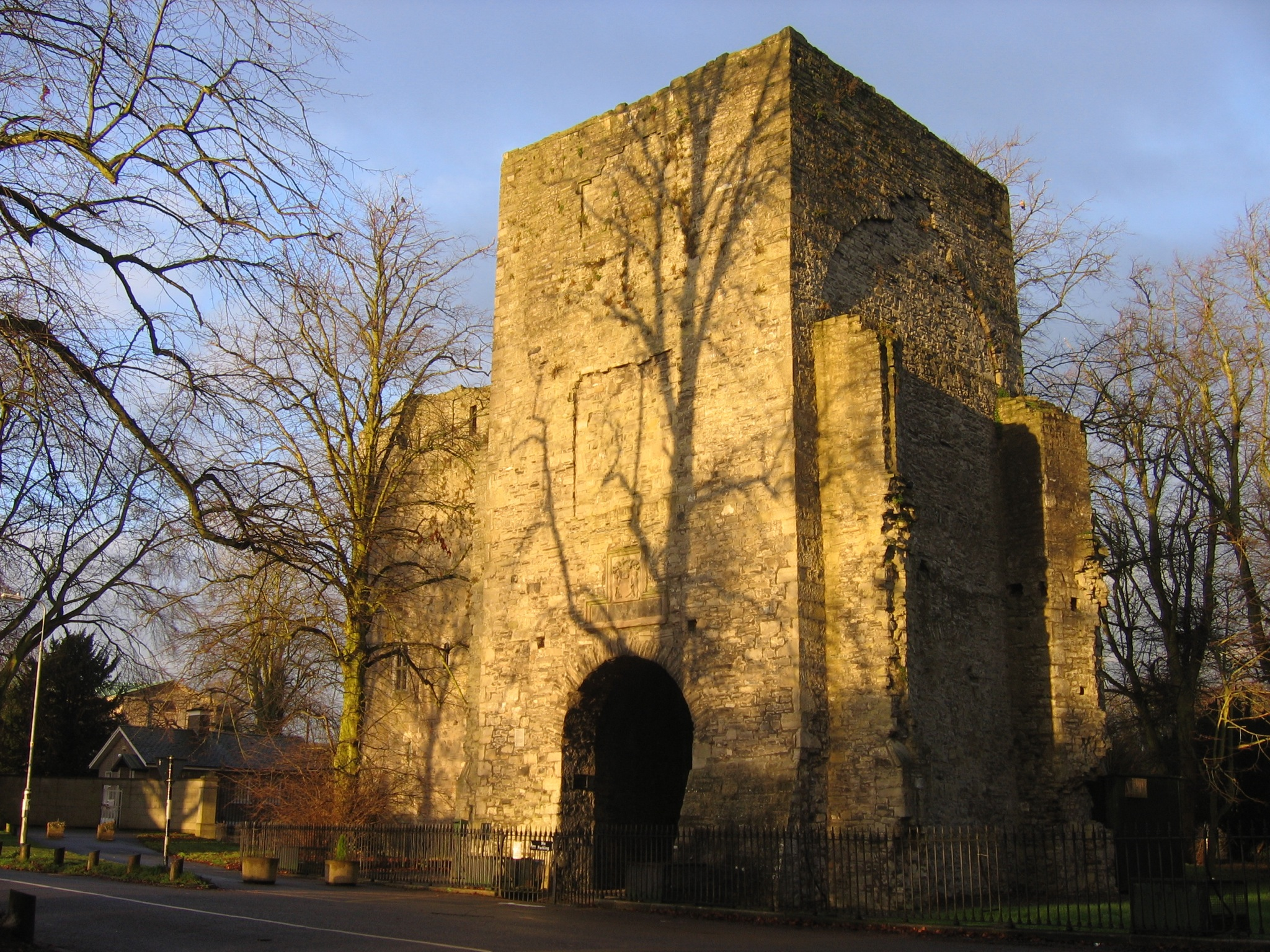
Maynooth Castle

The town is just inside the western edge of The Pale. It has, at either end of the main street, Maynooth Castle and Carton House, two former seats of the Dukes of Leinster. The castle was a stronghold of the 16th century historical figure Thomas FitzGerald, 10th Earl of Kildare who was better known as Silken Thomas. The castle was overrun in 1535, after the rebellion of the Earl.

The most important historical buildings in the town are those of St. Patrick's College and some which antedate the foundation of the college, while others are in the late Georgian and neo-Gothic revival style. The "new range" of buildings was erected by A. W. N. Pugin in 1850 under a commission from then college president Laurence F. Renehan, while the College Chapel was designed and completed by James Joseph McCarthy during the presidency of Robert Browne in 1894.

Conolly's Folly is within Maynooth's extensive town boundaries.

There are three old monastic settlements in the vicinity of Maynooth, including Laraghbryan and its cemetery, Taghadoe and its Round Tower and Grangewilliam (Donaghmore).

Maynooth Pound is a rare example of a surviving pound which has existed since the 18th century. The existing walls were built in 1822 although the pound is older than that. Historically, stray animals were impounded here to be returned to their owners for a fee or sold at auction if not claimed. More recently the pound was renovated and is now a place of recreation by the Lyreen River.

== Population ==
Historical population
Year	Pop.	±%
1813	1,468	—
1821	1,364	−7.1%
1831	2,053	+50.5%
1841	2,129	+3.7%
1851	1,696	−20.3%
1861	1,497	−11.7%
1871	1,414	−5.5%
1881	1,278	−9.6%
1891	958	−25.0%
1901	948	−1.0%
1911	886	−6.5%
1926	846	−4.5%
1936	632	−25.3%
1946	573	−9.3%
1951	581	+1.4%
1956	1,722	+196.4%
1961	1,753	+1.8%
1966	1,254	−28.5%
1971	1,296	+3.3%
1981	3,388	+161.4%
1986	6,893	+103.5%
1991	6,027	−12.6%
1996	8,528	+41.5%
2002	10,845	+27.2%
2006	10,715	−1.2%
2011	12,510	+16.8%
2016	14,585	+16.6%
2022	17,259	+18.3%

The population of 17,259 (according to the census in 2022) makes Maynooth the fourth largest settlement in County Kildare and the 29th largest settlement in Ireland. However, during the academic year the population of Maynooth nearly doubles in size. Measurement can be difficult as much of the population is transient – students at Maynooth University (above 12,000) or St. Patrick's College, or temporary employees at the nearby Intel and Hewlett Packard Enterprise facilities (both located in Leixlip).

== Education ==
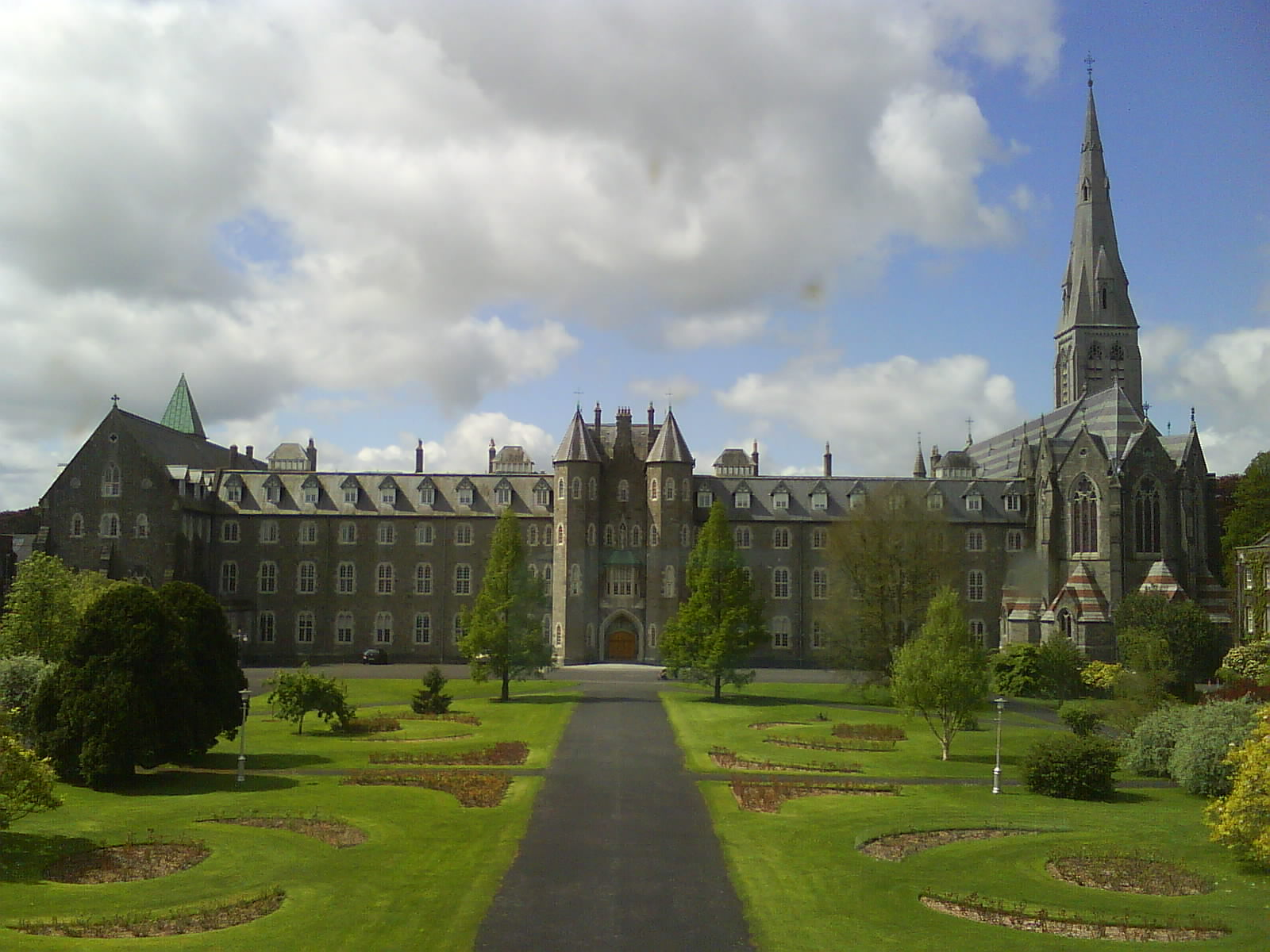
St Patrick's College

There are two third-level educational institutions – St Patrick's College, founded under King George III in 1795 to train Ireland's Roman Catholic clergy, and Maynooth University, separated from St. Patrick's College in 1997 – located in the town. They share campus space and many facilities.

There are two secondary schools (Maynooth Post Primary & Maynooth Community College, run from the same premises by Kildare and Wicklow Education and Training Board), and five primary schools: the Presentation Sisters girls-only school, the Dublin Archdiocese boys-only school (St. Mary's BNS), the Educate Together school, the Dublin Archdiocese Irish-language school and the An Foras Pátrúnachta multi-denominational Irish-language primary school, currently co-located with the other Irish-language school.

A KWETB Irish-language secondary school opened in September 2020.

== Amenities ==
The town contains a fire station, in addition to the area's part-time Garda station, a health centre, a public library, and a credit union as well as various restaurants, including Romayo's which was voted to be the best Take-Away in Leinster in 2014. Maynooth Community Library hosts regular public events, including book clubs, a film club, children's storytime, and author visits. It also offers services and events relating to National Healthy Ireland and Work Matters initiatives.

== Churches ==
Maynooth is served by two churches named St. Mary's, one St. Mary's Church of Ireland (Anglican) which is incorporated into the walls of St. Patrick's College, and St. Mary's Roman Catholic Church, where the Kilcock Road turns into Maynooth Village, serving the Maynooth Parish of St. Mary's and Lady chapel. Also close by is the former Moyglare Church which is used as the Church of Ireland, Meath & Kildare Diocesan Centre. Maynooth Community Church, a congregation linked to the Presbyterian Church in Ireland, has applied for planning permission to construct a church.

== Economy ==
The town is the main retail and service centre for North Kildare and South Meath, with several supermarkets as well as a wide variety of non-chain stores.

In October 2005, Dunnes Stores opened a major shopping centre off the town's main street, Manor Mills. This centre contains a number of other high street shops.

Carton House is a five-star hotel located on the outskirts of Maynooth. In 2020, it was announced that the hotel would be managed by the Fairmont hospitality group.

== Transport ==
=== Canal ===
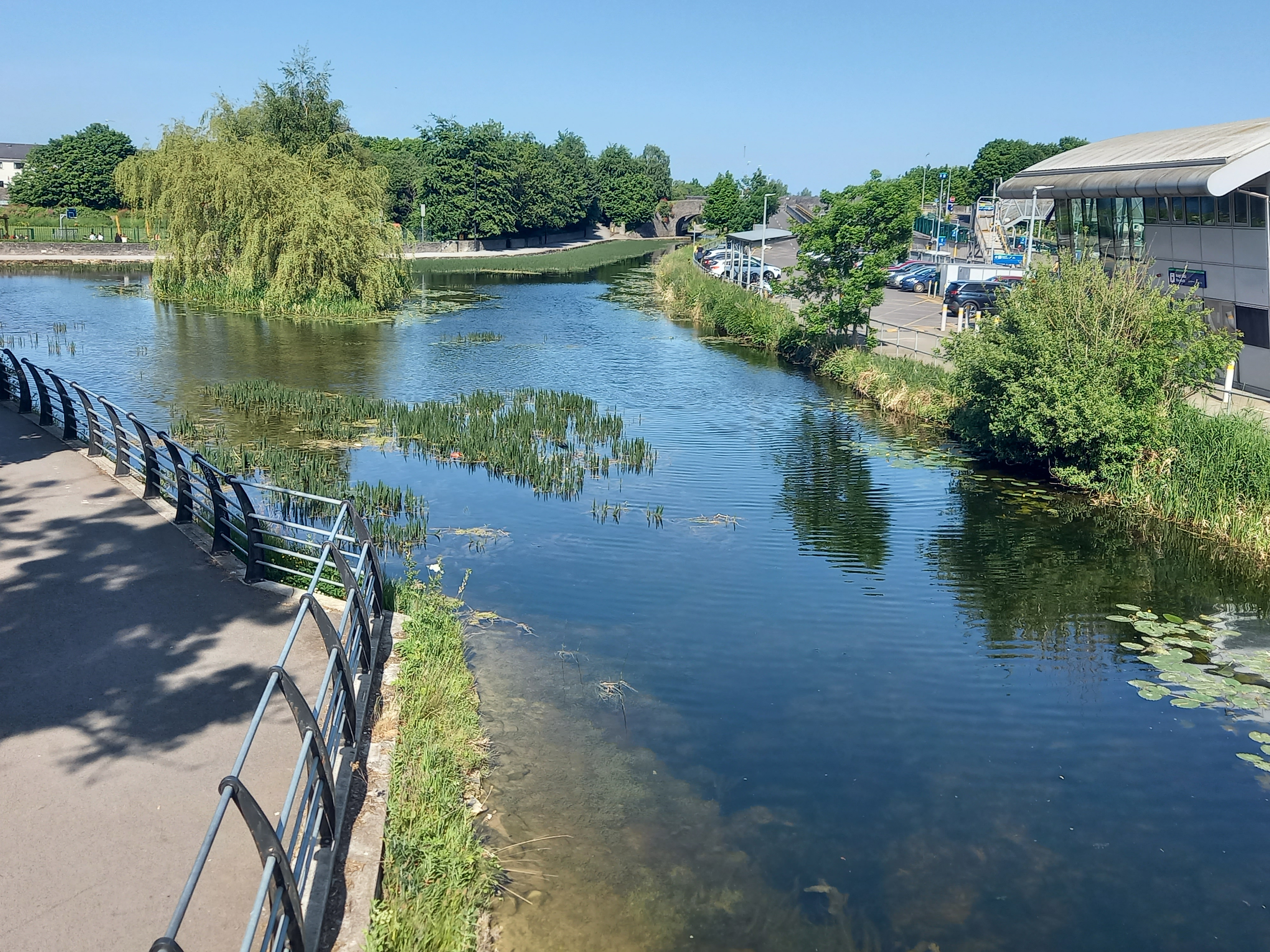
Royal Canal harbour, Maynooth 2023

When the Royal Canal was designed in 1790, with a planned length of 175 km, with 76 locks, 65 aqueducts and 85 bridges, it was intended to pass north of the town of Maynooth. However the Duke of Leinster contributed £1,000 towards the cost of the £200,000 undertaking and insisted that his town would be served by the canal. Maynooth has a canal harbour, and the canal is navigable from central Dublin to this point and onwards to Clondara, County Longford. It is now mostly used for leisure and drainage purposes but historically was used for passengers and freight (grain, potatoes, coal and coke, manure, turf, bricks, stone, sand, timber, and general merchandise) and Maynooth's canal harbour provided a stopping point before Dublin. When the railways arrived, passengers transferred to the quicker rail service.

The harbour, known locally as Duke's Harbour, is roughly triangular in shape and on the north side of the canal, opposite the railway station, is a popular fishing area.

=== Rail ===
Maynooth railway station is one of the busiest in the Dublin / Kildare region, as it serves two major educational institutions and is a major commuter town for people working in Dublin. The town is the terminus of most Iarnród Éireann Western Commuter trains, as well as being served by the Dublin-Sligo InterCity service.

In December 2019, Iarnród Éireann awarded a contract for Multi-Disciplinary Consultancy Team for the expansion of the Dublin Area Rapid Transit on the Maynooth Line which will lead to electrification of the line to Maynooth and increase capacity on the line.

=== Bus ===
Dublin Bus operates routes C3, C4 and the night buses C5 and C6, from Maynooth to Ringsend in Dublin. Go-Ahead Ireland operates the W61, which links Maynooth to the Hazelhatch and Celbridge Railway Station. Bus Éireann services 22 (Ballina to Dublin Airport), 23 (Sligo to Dublin Airport) and 115 (Mullingar/Kilcock to Dublin) serve the town, as well as Aircoach's route 706/706X (Galway to Dublin Airport). Passengers may travel from Maynooth westbound or to Dublin Airport.

JJ Kavanagh/National Transport Authority route 139 links Naas to Blanchardstown via Maynooth. A number of private operators also serve the town, linking it with nearby towns and cities; many in college term-time only.

== Sport and voluntary groups ==
=== Golf ===
Carton House Golf Club is located in Maynooth. The Golfing Union of Ireland, the longest established golf union in the world, have their national headquarters on the estate. This facility also comprises the GUI National Academy, a 22-acre (89,000 m^{2}) teaching facility. It has a driving range, putting green, and a short game area.

=== GAA ===
Maynooth GAA is the local Gaelic Athletic Association club and has competed in the senior football championship in Kildare since 2009.

=== Soccer ===
Maynooth Town F.C. is the local soccer club. The senior men's team competes in co-operation with Maynooth University as Maynooth University Town F.C., a member of the Leinster Senior League. They won the FAI Intermediate Cup in 2018 and hence now compete in the senior FAI Cup. They progressed to the second round of the 2018 tournament. They reached the FAI Cup quarter-final in 2021 for the first time. They were beaten 4–0 in the quarter final by Bohemians F.C.

=== Rugby ===
North Kildare RFC is the local rugby club and is situated about 3 km from Maynooth on the Kilcock road. Maynooth native Bob Casey (born 1978) was a professional rugby player and a senior Irish international.

Maynooth University and the Leixlip based Barnhall Rugby Club merged in 2010 and renamed to MU Barnhall RFC in 2015, fielding 28 teams both male and female from U7 to Senior All-Ireland League.

=== Equestrian ===
Maynooth is home to the thoroughbred horse racing and breeding operation, Moyglare Stud Farm.

=== Basketball ===
North Kildare Eagles Basketball Club is based in Maynooth. The club runs an academy for kids aged 5-10, juvenile teams for girls and boys aged 11-18, and Basketball4All for children with disabilities. Juvenile teams compete in competitions run by the Midlands Area Basketball Board.

=== Cycling ===
There are two cycling clubs based in Maynooth: Maynooth Cycling Club and Maynooth Students for Charity. The latter, also known as the Galway Cycle, runs out of Maynooth University, and from January to April culminating in a charity cycle to Galway and back over a weekend. The club has raised over 1 million euro for charity since its inception.

=== Scouting ===
The Maynooth Scout group has been in existence since 1975. After many years operating out of the Maynooth Post Primary school they restored and redeveloped the Geraldine Hall, a protected building, as their Den in 2013.

== Notable people ==
- Nell Mescal, singer-songwriter
- Paul Mescal, actor
- Domhnall Ua Buachalla, governor-general of the Irish Free State

== International relations ==
Maynooth has a town twinning agreement with Canet-en-Roussillon in France.

== See also ==
- List of towns and villages in Ireland
- Maynooth Grant, a political issue during the premiership of Robert Peel
