= Edmund Butler (bishop) =

Archbishop of Cashel (died 1551)

Edmund Butler (died 1551) was appointed as the Catholic Archbishop of Cashel in 1527. He was the illegitimate son of Piers Butler, 8th Earl of Ormonde. In 1539 he conformed to the reformed Church of Ireland retaining his temporalities.

== Early career ==
Butler studied at Oxford University, became a friar of the Trinitarian Order, and was appointed prior of the abbey of that order at Athassel in the County of Tipperary. In 1524, Butler was nominated by the pope to the archbishopric of Cashel, with permission to retain the priory of Athassel. The consecration of Butler took place in 1527. He was a member of the privy council in Ireland, held a provincial synod at Limerick in 1529, and, on the dissolution of religious houses in Ireland, surrendered the abbey of Athassel to the crown.

== Role in politics ==
Butler swore the Oath of Supremacy at Clonmel early in 1539. He was present in the parliament at Dublin in 1541 which enacted the statute conferring the title of 'King of Ireland' on Henry VIII and his heirs. The communication addressed to the king on this subject, bearing the signature of the Archbishop of Cashel, has been reproduced on plate lxxi in the third part of 'Facsimiles of National Manuscripts of Ireland.' Butler's autograph and archiepiscopal seal were attached to the 'Complaint' addressed to Henry VIII in 1542 by 'the Gentlemen, Inheritors, and Freeholders of the county of Tipperary.' This document also appears in the same 'Facsimiles.' A letter from Butler to the Protector, Somerset, in 1548, is preserved among the state papers in the Public Record Office, London. In 1549-50 Butler took part at Limerick with James, Earl of Desmond, and the king's commissioners, in the enactment of ordinances for the government of Munster. References to Butler and his proceedings concerning public affairs in the districts of Ireland with which he was connected occur in the English governmental correspondence of his time.

== Death ==
Butler died on 5 March 1551, and was buried in the cathedral at the Rock of Cashel, under an elaborate marble monument which he had erected, but which does not now exist.
