= Thomas FitzGerald, 10th Earl of Kildare =

Irish noble (1513–1537)

Thomas FitzGerald
- The Earl of Kildare
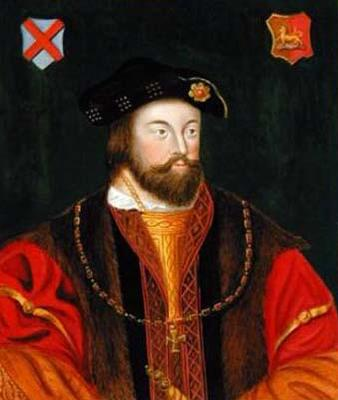
- Reign: 1534–1537
- Predecessor: Gerald FitzGerald
- Successor: Title forfeited
- Born: 1513
- Died: 3 February 1537 (aged 23/24); Tyburn, London, Kingdom of England
- Noble family: FitzGerald dynasty
- Father: Gerald FitzGerald
- Mother: Elizabeth Zouche

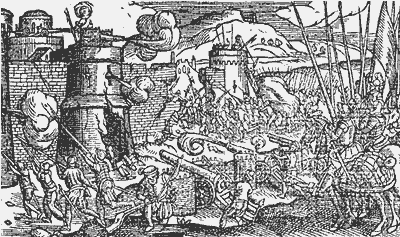
16th-century woodcut of Silken Thomas's attack on Dublin Castle

Thomas FitzGerald, 10th Earl of Kildare (1513 – 3 February 1537), also known as Silken Thomas (Irish: Tomás an tSíoda), was a leading figure in 16th-century Irish history.

== Life ==
Thomas Fitzgerald was born in London in 1513, the son of Gerald FitzGerald, 9th Earl of Kildare, and his first wife Elizabeth Zouche, who was a distant cousin of Henry VII. After the death of his mother, he was raised by the wife of his father's steward, Janet Eustace. Little else is known of his early years. What is known is that Thomas spent a number of years in the English court and married the youngest daughter of Sir Adrian Fortescue, named Frances. It's unclear whether this marriage took place before or after his father's return to Ireland in August 1530.

In February 1534, his father was summoned to London and appointed the 21-year-old Thomas (by then Lord Offaly) deputy governor of Ireland in his absence. In June 1534, Thomas heard rumours that his father had been executed in the Tower of London and that the English government intended the same fate for himself and his uncles.

== Kildare rebellion (1534–1535) ==
Kildare Rebellion
- Part of Tudor conquest of Ireland
Date	11 June 1534 – 3 February 1537
Location	Province of Leinster, Ireland
Result	English victory: Beginning of the Tudor conquest of Ireland

Belligerents
FitzGerald of Kildare: Allied Gaelic and Norman clans	Kingdom of England: Lordship of Ireland

Commanders and leaders
Thomas FitzGerald	William Skeffington; Leonard Grey

He summoned the council to St. Mary's Abbey, Dublin, and on 11 June 1534, accompanied by 140 armoured gallowglasses with silk fringes on their helmets (from which he got his nickname), rode to the abbey and publicly renounced his allegiance to his cousin King Henry VIII, Lord of Ireland.

The Chancellor, Archbishop John Alen, attempted to persuade him not to commit himself to such a rash proceeding; but the young lord's harper, understanding only Irish, and seeing signs of wavering in FitzGerald's bearing, commenced to recite a poem in praise of the deeds of his ancestors, telling him at the same time that he lingered there over long. Roused by this he threw down the sword of state and rushed from the hall, followed by his adherents. The council sent an order for his immediate arrest to the Lord Mayor of Dublin, who, however, had not sufficient force at his disposal.

The Earl of Desmond and many of his father's oldest and best friends reasoned with him; but he was not to be turned from his purpose. As Lord Deputy, Kildare had under his control most of the Pale's fortresses and large government stores.

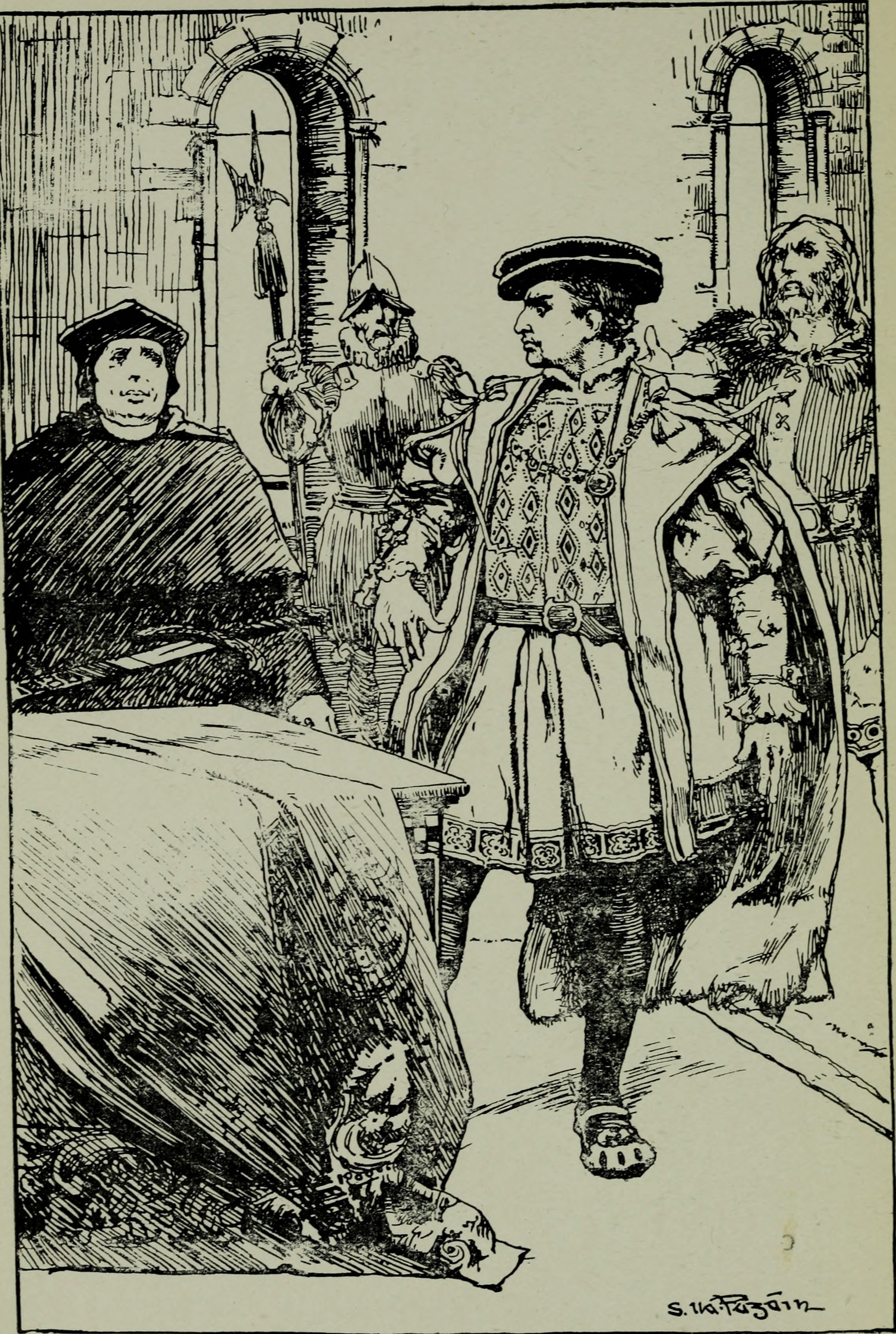
Illustration of the Earl of Kildare throwing down the sword of state.

Dublin Castle alone held out for the King of England. Lord Offaly called the lords of the Pale to the siege of the Castle; those who refused to swear fidelity to him he sent as prisoners to his Maynooth Castle. Goods and chattels belonging to the King's subjects he declared forfeited, and he announced his intention of exiling or putting to death all born in England. He sent messengers to his cousin and friend Lord Butler, son of the Earl of Ormond, offering to divide the kingdom with him if he would join his cause, but Butler refused. Several children of the citizens of Dublin in different parts of the Pale were seized as hostages for the good behaviour of the city.

In July, he attacked Dublin Castle, but his army was routed. He was, rightly or wrongly, judged to be responsible for the execution at Artane of Archbishop Alen, who had tried to mediate; this lost him support from the clergy. According to a long-established tradition, the killers, John Teeling and Nicholas Wafer, misunderstood his order, given in Irish, to "take this fellow away" (Beir uaim an bodach) as an order to kill Alen. By this time his father had taken ill and died in London, and he had technically succeeded as 10th earl, but the Crown never confirmed his title. He retreated to his stronghold at Maynooth Castle, but in March 1535 this was taken by an English force under Sir William Skeffington by bribing a guard, while Thomas was absent gathering reinforcements to relieve it. The surrendered garrison was put to death, which became known as the "Maynooth Pardon". Thomas had wrongly assumed that his cause would attract overwhelming support, in particular from Catholics opposed to Henry VIII's English Reformation. But Henry's new policy also outlawed Lutheranism, and so Henry was not finally excommunicated until 1538.

== Execution of Offaly and five uncles ==
In July, Lord Leonard Grey arrived from England as Lord Deputy of Ireland; Fitzgerald, seeing his army melting away and his allies submitting one by one, asked for pardon for his offences. He was still a formidable opponent, and Grey, wishing to avoid a prolonged conflict, guaranteed his personal safety and persuaded him to submit unconditionally to the King's mercy. According to the Irish Tree Council, legend has it that Silken Thomas played a lute under the boughs of the now oldest planted tree in Ireland, the Silken Thomas Yew, the night before he surrendered to King Henry VIII. In October 1535 he was sent as a prisoner to the Tower of London. Despite Grey's guarantee, he was executed with his five uncles at Tyburn, London, on 3 February 1537. According to G. G. Nichols, the five uncles were "...draune from the Tower in to Tyborne, and there alle hongyd and hedded and quartered, save the Lord Thomas for he was but hongyd and hedded and his body buried at the Crost Freeres in the qwere..."

The Attainder of the Earl of Kildare Act 1536 was passed to permit his execution and the confiscation of his property. The 1536 Act remained law until it was repealed by the Statute Law Revision (Pre-1922) Act 2005.

Silken Thomas's revolt caused Henry to pay more attention to Irish matters, and was a factor in the creation of the Kingdom of Ireland in 1542. In particular, the powers of the lords deputy were curbed, and policies such as surrender and regrant were introduced. To provide for greater security the Royal Irish Army was established as a standing army.

== See also ==
- Attainder of the Earl of Kildare Act 1536
- List of Irish uprisings
- History of County Kildare

Peerage of Ireland
Preceded by Gerald FitzGerald	Earl of Kildare; 1534–1537	Succeeded by Forfeit (restored in 1569 for Gerald FitzGerald)
