= FitzGerald (surname) =

Arms of the FitzGerald dynasty.

FitzGerald or Fitzgerald, is an Irish surname of Hiberno-Norman origin. It is a patronymic derived from the prefix Fitz- from the Latin filius (son) plus Gerald, thus meaning "son of Gerald”. In Goidelic languages, e.g. the Irish language, it is rendered Mac Gearailt.

== People ==
- Adolphus L. Fitzgerald (1840–1921), Justice of the Supreme Court of Nevada
- Alan Fitzgerald (satirist) (1935–2011), Australian journalist, satirist and politician
- Alexis FitzGerald Snr (1916–1985), Irish politician
- Alexis FitzGerald Jnr (1945–2015), Irish politician
- Alice Fitzgerald (1875–1962), American nurse
- Annie Fitzgerald (1844–1934), American landowner
- Barry Fitzgerald (1888–1961), Irish actor
- Barry Fitzgerald (investigator), paranormal investigator for SyFy Channel's Ghost Hunters International
- Bea Fitzgerald (born 1996), English author
- Brian Fitzgerald (disambiguation), multiple people
- Brinsley FitzGerald (1859–1931), British stockbroker
- Caroline Fitzgerald (1865–1911), expatriate American poet
- Casey Fitzgerald, multiple people
- Charles Fitzgerald (1791–1887), governor of Gambia; governor of Western Australia
- Charles Patrick Fitzgerald (1902–1992), scholar of China
- Ciaran Fitzgerald (born 1952), Irish rugby union player
- Dai Fitzgerald (1872–1951), Welsh international rugby player
- Deirdre FitzGerald (born 1936), Australian lawyer
- Desmond FitzGerald (politician) (1888–1947), Irish revolutionary, poet and politician
- Desmond FitzGerald, 29th Knight of Glin, president of the Irish Georgian Society
- Edmund Fitzgerald (disambiguation), multiple people
- Edward FitzGerald (disambiguation), multiple people
- Eithne FitzGerald (born 1950), Irish politician
- Ella Fitzgerald (1917–1996), U.S. jazz singer
- Ena Fitzgerald (1889-1962), English novelist, poet
- F. Scott Fitzgerald (1896–1940), American novelist and short story writer
- Faith Thayer Fitzgerald (1943–2021), American physician, medical educator, and public speaker
- Fanny Emma Fitzgerald (later Fanny Grattan Guinness; 1831–1898), British writer and evangelist
- Fern Fitzgerald (born 1947), American actress
- Fionn Fitzgerald (born 1990), Irish football player
- Frances Fitzgerald (disambiguation), multiple people
- Francis Fitzgerald (disambiguation), multiple people
- Frank Fitzgerald (1885–1939), U.S. governor of Michigan
- Garret FitzGerald (1926–2011), seventh Taoiseach of the Republic of Ireland
- Garret A. FitzGerald (born 1950), Irish pharmacologist
- Garrett M. Fitzgerald (1806–1859), American politician
- Gene Fitzgerald (1932–2007), Irish politician
- Gerald Fitzgerald (disambiguation), multiple people
- Geraldine Fitzgerald (1913–2005), Irish-American actress
- George FitzGerald (disambiguation), multiple people
- George FitzGerald (1851–1901), Irish physicist
- Glynis Fitzgerald, American academic administrator
- Hermione FitzGerald (1864–1895), Duchess of Leinster
- Hermione FitzGerald (born 1985), Irish professional golfer
- Howie Fitzgerald (1902–1959), American baseball player
- Jack Fitzgerald (socialist) (1873–1929), founder member of the Socialist Party of Great Britain
- James FitzGerald (disambiguation), multiple people
- Jim Fitzgerald (businessman) (1926–2012), American businessman and philanthropist
- Joan Fitz-Gerald (born 1948), American politician in Colorado
- Joan Fitzgerald (politician) (born 1965), American politician in Wisconsin
- John Fitzgerald (disambiguation), multiple people
- John F. Fitzgerald, Mayor of Boston Massachusetts and grandfather of President John Fitzgerald Kennedy
- John Fitzgerald Kennedy, United States president
- John Fitzgerald (Medal of Honor) (1873–1948), American Medal of Honor recipient
- John D. FitzGerald, Irish economist
- Jonathan Fitzgerald English musician and co-founder member of Harwich International Shanty Festival from Harwich
- Joseph Fitzgerald (disambiguation), multiple people
- Judith Fitzgerald (1952–2015), Canadian poet
- Judkin-Fitzgerald baronets (Created 1801), of Lisheen, Co Tipperary, Ireland
- Karen Fitzgerald, American artist
- Kevin Fitzgerald (born 1951), U.S. veterinarian; appeared on the television program Emergency Vets
- Kevin W. Fitzgerald (1950–2007), American politician
- Larry Fitzgerald (born 1983), American football player
- Lawrence J. Fitzgerald (died 1918), NYS Treasurer 1886–1889
- LeMoine FitzGerald (1890–1956), Canadian artist, a member of the Group of Seven
- Les Fitzgerald, Scottish footballer
- Lewis Fitz-Gerald (born 1958), Australian actor and television director
- Liam Fitzgerald (1949–2025), Irish politician
- Lorna Fitzgerald (born 1996), English actress
- Lou Fitzgerald (1919–2013), American baseball player, scout and manager
- Martin Fitzgerald (disambiguation), multiple people
- Maurice FitzGerald (died 1176), (Anglo Norman) baron, progenitor of the famous Geraldines.
- Meryle Fitzgerald (1925–2004), All-American Girls Professional Baseball League ballplayer
- Michael Fitzgerald (disambiguation), multiple people
- Nick Fitzgerald (born 1996), American football player
- Pamela Jane Fitzgerald co-founder member of Harwich International Shanty Festival
- Pamela Fitzgerald (camogie) (born 1984), Irish camogie player
- Pat Fitzgerald (born 1974), U.S. football coach
- Paudie Fitzgerald (1933–2020), Irish cyclist
- Patrick Fitzgerald (born 1960), U.S. attorney; special prosecutor in the CIA leak scandal
- Penelope Fitzgerald (1916–2000), British poet, novelist and biographer
- Percy Hetherington Fitzgerald (1834–1925), Anglo-Irish author and critic
- Peter Fitzgerald (disambiguation), multiple people
- Ray Fitzgerald (politician) (1879–1963), Australian politician.
- Robert Fitzgerald (disambiguation), multiple people
- Ryan Fitzgerald (disambiguation), multiple people
- Sally Fitzgerald, New Zealand judge
- Sarah Fitz-Gerald (born 1968), Australian women's squash player
- Scott Fitzgerald (disambiguation), multiple people
- Stephen Fitzgerald (disambiguation), multiple people
- Susan Fitzgerald (1949–2013), Irish actress
- Tara Fitzgerald (born 1967), British actress
- Thomas Fitzgerald (disambiguation), multiple people
- Tom Fitzgerald (disambiguation), multiple people
- William Fitzgerald (disambiguation), multiple people
- Zelda Fitzgerald (1900–1948), wife of F. Scott Fitzgerald
- Paul Fitzgerald (1970–present), musician Dundee, Scotland and London England

== Fictional ==
- Penny Fitzgerald, character from The Amazing World of Gumball
- Patrick Fitzgerald, character from The Amazing World of Gumball
- Judith Fitzgerald, character from The Amazing World of Gumball
- Polly Fitzgerald, character from The Amazing World of Gumball
- Martin Fitzgerald, character from Without a Trace
- Jeremy Fitzgerald, protagonist of the second FNAF game for the main 5 nights and the extra 6th one
- Ralph Fitzgerald, character from World Without End, by Ken Follet

== See also ==
- FitzGerald dynasty
