= Fitzgerald =

Fitzgerald may refer to:

== People ==
- FitzGerald (surname), a surname
- Fitzgerald Hinds, Trinidadian politician
- Fitzgerald Toussaint (born 1990), former American football running back

== Place ==
=== Australia ===
- Fitzgerald River National Park, a national park in Western Australia
- Fitzgerald, Western Australia, a locality in the Shire of Ravensthorpe
- Fitzgerald Bay, a bay located between Point Lowly and Backy Point in South Australia

=== United States ===
- Fitzgerald, Georgia
- Fitzgerald, Wisconsin, a town in Winnebago County, Wisconsin
- Fitzgerald Marine Reserve, on the Pacific coast of Moss Beach, California
- Fitzgerald's, a live-music venue in Houston, Texas
- Fitzgerald Theater, a theatre in Saint Paul, Minnesota

== Other ==
- USS Fitzgerald, Arleigh Burke-class destroyer in the US Navy
- Fitzgerald Stadium, GAA stadium in Killarney, Ireland

== See also ==
- FitzGerald (disambiguation)
- Edmund Fitzgerald (disambiguation)
- Fitzgeralds Casino and Hotel (disambiguation)
- Fitzgerald, Alberta (disambiguation)
- Senator Fitzgerald (disambiguation)
- Nixon v. Fitzgerald, often referred to as Fitzgerald, a US Supreme Court case that dealt with immunity from prosecution of government officials
