= John Fitzgerald =

John or Jack Fitzgerald, or variants, may refer to:

== Military ==
- Sir John Forster FitzGerald (1785–1877), Irish soldier, officer in British Army during the Napoleonic wars and Liberal MP
- John Fitzgerald (soldier) (1817–?), American soldier
- John Fitzgerald (Medal of Honor) (1873–1948), American Medal of Honor recipient

== Nobility ==
- John FitzGerald, 1st Baron Desmond (died 1261)
- John FitzGerald, 1st Earl of Kildare (c. 1250–1316), Irish nobleman
- John FitzGerald, 4th Earl of Desmond (died 1399)
- John FitzGerald, de facto 12th Earl of Desmond (died 1534)
- John Fitzedmund Fitzgerald (died 1589), Irish baron
- John FitzGerald, 18th Earl of Kildare (1661–1707)
- Lord John FitzGerald (1952–2015), Irish nobleman

== Politics and law ==
=== UK ===
- Sir John Fitzgerald (governor) (fl. 1660s), Irish soldier and governor of Tangier
- John FitzGerald, 15th Knight of Kerry (1706–1741), Irish MP for Dingle
- John Fitzgerald (1775–1852), British MP for Seaford 1826–32
- John FitzGerald, Baron FitzGerald (1816–1889), Irish judge and politician
- Sir John Fitzgerald (brewer) (1857–1930), Lord Mayor of Newcastle upon Tyne, England, 1914–1915
- Jack Fitzgerald (socialist) (1873–1929), founding member of the Socialist Party of Great Britain

=== U.S. ===
- John Fitzgerald (Wisconsin politician) (c. 1827–1863), Wisconsin banker and politician
- John Wesley Fitzgerald (politician, born 1850) (1850–1908), American businessman and politician
- John C. Fitzgerald (1863–1928), New York politician
- John F. Fitzgerald (1863–1950), aka "Honey Fitz", mayor of Boston, grandfather and namesake of president John F. Kennedy
- John J. Fitzgerald (1872–1952), U.S. representative from New York
- John I. Fitzgerald (1882–1966), American attorney and politician in Massachusetts
- John Moonan Fitzgerald (1923–2008), U.S. jurist and politician
- John Warner Fitzgerald (1924–2006), Michigan chief justice
- John Wesley Fitzgerald (politician, born 1990), Michigan state representative
- John F. Kennedy, (1917–1963), 35th U.S. President

=== Other figures in politics and law ===
- John Daniel FitzGerald (1862–1922), Australian politician
- Jack Fitzgerald (Australian politician) (1864–1936), member of the South Australian House of Assembly
- John FitzGerald of Dromana (died 1662 or 1664), MP for Dungarvan in the Irish Parliament
- Jack Fitzgerald (Irish politician) (John Fitzgerald, 1914–1994), Irish Labour Party politician
- Sir John Fitzgerald, 2nd Baronet (c. 1640–1712), Irish Jacobite politician and soldier

== Science and medicine ==
- John Patrick Fitzgerald (1815–1897), New Zealand doctor, community leader and hospital superintendent
- John G. FitzGerald (1882–1940), Canadian physician
- John Fitzgerald (computer scientist) (born 1965), British computer scientist and Chair of Formal Methods Europe

== Sports ==
=== American football ===
- John Fitzgerald (center) (1948–2026), Dallas Cowboys center
- John Fitzgerald (quarterback) (born 1975), Arena Football League quarterback
- John Fitzgerald (offensive guard) (fl. 1998–2000), former University of Central Oklahoma lineman

=== Association football (soccer) ===
- Jack Fitzgerald (footballer) (1930–2003), Irish footballer
- John Fitzgerald (soccer) (born 1968), Canadian soccer player, businessman & corporate lawyer
- John Fitzgerald (footballer) (born 1984), Irish footballer

=== Baseball ===
- John Fitzgerald (Rochester Broncos pitcher) (1866–1892), pitcher for the 1890 Rochester Broncos
- John Fitzgerald (Boston Reds pitcher) (1870–1921), pitcher for the 1891 Boston Reds
- John Fitzgerald (1950s pitcher) (born 1933), pitcher for the 1958 San Francisco Giants
- John Fitzgerald (catcher) (fl. 1940s), Negro league baseball catcher

=== Other sports ===
- John J. Fitz Gerald (1893–1963), American turf racing sportswriter
- Jack Fitzgerald (cyclist) (1899–1973), Australian cyclist
- John Fitzgerald (Australian footballer, born 1961), former Geelong player
- John Fitzgerald (Australian footballer, born 1901) (1901–1987), Fitzroy player
- John Fitzgerald (tennis) (born 1960), Australian tennis player
- John Fitzgerald (pentathlete) (born 1948), American modern pentathlete
- John Fitzgerald (rugby union) (born 1961), Irish rugby union international player
- Jack Fitzgerald (rugby league) (1925–1965), Australian rugby league player

== Others ==
- John Fitzgerald (priest) (fl. 1627–1641), dean of Cork
- John Anster Fitzgerald (1819–1906), English fairy painter and portrait artist
- John Driscoll Fitz-Gerald (1873–1946), American scholar and philologist
- John D. Fitzgerald (1906–1988), American author of children's books
- John Fitzgerald (poet) (1927–2007), English Carmelite priest and philosopher and Welsh-language poet
- John D. FitzGerald (born 1949), Irish economist and former director of the Economic and Social Research Institute
- John S. Fitzgerald, frontiersman and erstwhile companion to Hugh Glass

== See also ==
- Fitzgerald (disambiguation)
