= FitzGerald (disambiguation) =

The FitzGerald dynasty is a Hiberno-Norman or Cambro-Norman noble family.

FitzGerald may also refer to:

== People ==
- FitzGerald (surname)

== Business ==
- FitzGerald's, department stores in Tasmania, Australia

== Other uses ==
- FitzGerald (crater), lunar crater
- Fitzgerald factor, a name for high-molecular-weight kininogen, a blood coagulation protein
- Lorentz–FitzGerald contraction hypothesis, physics
- The SS Edmund Fitzgerald, ship that sank in Lake Superior
  - "The Wreck of the Edmund Fitzgerald", a 1976 song by Gordon Lightfoot about the ship
- The Fitzgerald Inquiry, judicial inquiry into corruption in the Queensland police
- The FitzGerald Report, a 2005 UN report on the assassination of former Lebanese Prime Minister Rafik Hariri
- USS Fitzgerald (DDG-62), a destroyer of the United States Navy
- FitzGerald Special, a snubnosed revolver concept

== See also ==
- Fitzcarraldo (disambiguation)
- Justice Finch (disambiguation)
- Fitzgerald (disambiguation)
- Fitzgeralds Casino and Hotel (disambiguation)
