= Oil Bowl (high school) =

High school football all-star game

The Oil Bowl is a high school football all-star game in Wichita Falls, Texas. The game began in 1938, originally between East and West Texas high school football all-stars. In 1945, the game began pitting teams from Oklahoma and Texas, and continued in that format until 2012 (except for 1961 and 2009). In 2013, a dispute concerning the disposition of Oklahoma's share of the game's charitable proceeds led the Oklahoma Coaches Association to withdraw from the game, and the 2013 game matched two Texas teams. For the years in which Texas and Oklahoma teams played, the overall record was 46–19–1 in favor of Texas.

The name also applies to a high school football game played annually between Natrona County High School and Kelly Walsh High School, two cross team rivals located in Casper, Wyoming.

== Distinguished alumni ==
These are players and coaches who distinguished themselves with their achievements after participating in the Oil Bowl game.

=== Players ===
- Jack Crain (Nocona, Texas; 1938)

"Jackrabbit" Crain was a two-time All-American running back at the University of Texas and finished 10th in the Heisman Trophy voting his senior year. After graduation, he served four terms as state representative for District 61 in Texas.

- Hub Bechtol (Lubbock, Texas; 1943)

Played for both the Texas Tech Red Raiders and the Texas Longhorns. As an end at Texas in 1944, 1945 and 1946, Bechtol became the first Southwest Conference player to become a three-time All-American. In 1946 Cotton Bowl Classic, he was on the receiving end of nine of Bobby Layne's completions in a 40–27 win over Missouri. Played three seasons with the Baltimore Colts.

- Bobby Layne (Highland Park, Texas; 1944)

Layne is a member of both the College Football and Pro Football hall of fames. Set eleven passing records as a quarterback at Texas and led the Longhorns to a 10–1–0 record his senior year. Led the Detroit Lions to NFL titles in 1952, 1953, and 1957 and quarterbacked the Pittsburgh Steelers from 1958 to 1962.

- Dick Harris (Wichita Falls, Texas; 1945)

Played both center and guard at Texas and joined Bobby Layne as the only Longhorns to win All-Southwest Conference honors four times. Was first-round draft pick of Chicago Bears in 1949.

- Lindy Berry (Wichita Falls, Texas; 1946)

An All-American quarterback at TCU his senior season, Berry was a key player for the Frogs for four years. He was All-Southwest Conference as a junior and senior. As a sophomore, he led the nation in punt returns with 494 yards and as a junior was fourth in the nation in total offense.

- Hayden Fry (Odessa, Texas; 1947)

Although he was a good college quarterback at Baylor, Fry made his name as a college coach. He was head coach at SMU, North Texas, and Iowa. At SMU, he signed the first African American recruit in Southwest Conference history, Jerry Levias. He coached 20 seasons at Iowa and retired with 232 Division I victories.

- Bud McFadin (Iraan, Texas; 1947)

Played offensive guard and defensive tackle for Texas from 1948 through 1950 and made All-American both ways and was inducted into the College Football Hall of Fame in 1983. Was the MVP of the Chicago Tribune All-Star Game after his senior year and played professionally for the Rams, Broncos, and Oilers.

- Billy Howton (Plainview, Texas; 1948)

After playing college football at Rice, Howton spent twelve seasons in the NFL with the Packers, Browns, and Cowboys. A four-time Pro Bowl participant, he caught 503 for 8,459 yards and 61 touchdowns.

- Byron Townsend (Odessa; 1948)

An All-Southwest Conference running back at Texas in 1950 Ran for 105 yards and a touchdown against Tennessee in the 1951 Cotton Bowl Classic.

- Eddie Crowder (Muskogee; 1949)

An All-American quarterback and safety for Oklahoma for 1950–52 and was a member of OU's first national championship team in 1952. Drafted by the New York Giants but a nerve injury in his throwing arm prevented him from having an NFL career. Instead, he went into coaching and became head coach and later athletic director at Colorado.

- Buck McPhail (Oklahoma City; 1949)

In 1951, McPhail was an All-American at OU as he and Heisman Trophy winner Billy Vessels made up one of the greatest rushing tandems of all-time. McPhail set a national collegiate record that year by averaging 8.56 yards per rush. Drafted by the Baltimore Colts in 1953.

- Billy Bookout (Wichita Falls; 1950)

An All-Big Seven cornerback at Oklahoma before finishing his college career as a Little All-American at Austin College. Played for the Green Bay Packers before starting a coaching career. Was the first head football coach at Hurst Bell and later coached at nearby Euless Trinity.

- Max Boydston (Muskogee; 1951)

A three-time all-conference receiver for Oklahoma in 1952, 1953 and 1954. Played seven NFL seasons with the Chicago Bears, Dallas Texans and Oakland Raiders.

- Preston Carpenter (Muskogee; 1952)

A receiver at Arkansas who was a chosen on the Razorbacks all-decade team of the 1950s. He played 13 seasons in the NFL and was a Pro Bowler with the Steelers in 1962.

- Bobby Boyd (Garland; 1956)

Played on three OU teams from 1957 through 1959 that went 27–5. Was an all-conference quarterback in 1959 but converted to defense in the NFL and played nine seasons in the Baltimore Colts' secondary and had 57 interceptions.

- "Wahoo" McDaniel (Midland; 1956)

Played three seasons on OU's line but made a name for himself later in professional wrestling. McDaniel became a legend in professional wrestling in a career that spanned from 1966 to 1993.

- Ronnie Bull (Bishop; 1958)

Bull was a star running back at Baylor before spending nine of 10 NFL seasons with the George Halas' Chicago Bears. In 10 years, he had 4,701 rushing-receiving yards as a pro.

- Don Trull (Tulsa; 1959)

Trull was a three-time All-American quarterback at Baylor in 1961, 1962 and 1963, leading the NCAA in pass completions his junior and senior seasons. Played with the Houston Oilers from 1964 through 1969.

- Dave Parks (Abilene; 1960)

An All-American receiver for Texas Tech in 1963 and the No. 1 draft pick of the San Francisco 49ers in 1964.

- Scott Appleton (Brady; 1960)

And outstanding defensive tackle that helped Texas win a national championship in 1963. Won the Outland Trophy that year and was the defensive MVP in a 28–0 Cotton Bowl Classic victory over second-ranked Navy. He had 12 tackles and a sack of Roger Staubach in that game. Was drafted No. 1 by both the Dallas Cowboys and Houston Oilers, but played for the Oilers in the AFL.

- Mickey Maroney (Wichita Falls; 1963)

After playing for Wichita Falls High School's undefeated state championship team in 1961, Maroney went to the University of Arkansas and played for the Razorbacks' national championship team of 1964. He joined the Secret Service in 1971 and protected several U.S. presidents. Maroney was killed in the bombing of the Alfred P. Murrah Federal Building in Oklahoma City on April 19, 1995.

- Bob Kalsu (Del City; 1963)

Kalsu was an All-American offensive tackle for Oklahoma in 1967 and went on to play for the Buffalo Bills. But Kalsu was more than a football player, he was the only professional athlete killed in Vietnam.

- Chris Gilbert (Houston Spring Branch; 1965)

At Texas, Gilbert became the first back in college football history to record three straight 1,000-yard seasons. A consensus All-American and eighth in Heisman Trophy voting his senior year.

- Jerry Levias (Beaumont; 1965)

The first black scholarship athlete in the history of the Southwest Conference, Levias set records at SMU for receptions in one game (15); in one season (80); in a career (155) and most receiving yards in a season (1,131) and career (2,275). NFL rookie of the year for the Houston Oilers in 1969. A 2004 inductee into the College Football Hall of Fame.

- Bill Bradley (Palestine; 1965)

This high school quarterback made the transition to defense under Darrell Royal at Texas and went on to become a defensive back with the Philadelphia Eagles in the NFL.

- Steve Owens (Miami, Okla; 1966)

A Heisman Trophy winner at Oklahoma in 1969 after leading the nation in rushing with 1,523 yards and 23 touchdowns. Scored 56 TDs in three years with the Sooners. Once had a string of 17 straight 100-yard rushing games. Inducted into the College Football Hall of Fame in 1991.

- James Street (Longview; 1966)

Never lost a game as a starting quarterback for Texas. Street won the last nine games with the Longhorns in 1968 and then led them to an 11–0 national championship season in 1969.

- Chuck Hixson (San Antonio; 1966)

As a quarterback at SMU, Hixson led the nation in passing his sophomore season of 1968, as he won the Sammy Baugh Trophy. He is the Mustangs' career leader in passing yards (7,179), completions (642) and touchdown passes (40).

- Ken Mendenhall (Enid; 1966)

Devastating one-on-one blocker who made All-American at OU in 1969 and cleared the path to the Heisman Trophy for Steve Owens.

- Riley Odoms (Corpus Christi; 1968)

Odoms was a four-time Pro Bowler in his 12 years as a tight end with the Denver Broncos. Played in Super Bowl XII for the Broncos lost 27–10 to the Dallas Cowboys.

- Jack Mildren (Abilene Cooper; 1968)

Mildren was an All-American quarterback for OU's wishbone offense that led the nation in rushing, total offense and scoring in 1971. Went on to play for the Baltimore Colts and served as lieutenant governor for the state of Oklahoma from 1990 to 1994.

- Jerry Sisemore (Plainview; 1969)

This College Football Hall of Famer was an All-American offensive tackle who helped Texas win three straight Southwest Conference championships. He was the third selection in the 1972 NFL Draft and had a 12-year Pro Bowl career with the Eagles.

- Lucious Selmon (Eufaula; 1970)

The oldest of the Selmon brothers was a two-time All-American defensive tackle in 1972 and 1973 and played on three OU teams that had a combined 32–2–1 record and won a national title in 1973. Served as an assistant coach for the Sonners from 1976 to 1994.

- Mike Thomas (Greenville; 1971)

Played six NFL seasons with the Redskins and Chargers, making the Pro Bowl in 1976 after rushing for 1,101 yards with Washington. Ran for 2,826 yards in his first three NFL seasons.

- Randy Hughes (Tulsa Memorial; 1971)

Intercepted five passes and returned them 165 yards during Oklahoma's national championship season of 1973 and was an All-American safety for the Sooners in 1974. Drafted in the fourth round by the Dallas Cowboys in 1975, Hughes played six seasons in the NFL and appeared in three Super Bowls.

- Tinker Owens (Miami, Okla; 1972)

He followed the large footsteps of his Heisman Trophy-winner brother Steve to OU but quickly made a name for himself with a 132-yard MVP performance in the Sugar Bowl his freshman year. Was twice an All-American receiver for the Sooners. Played four NFL seasons with the Saints.

- Dewey Selmon (Eufaula; 1972)

In his three years as a starting tackle at Oklahoma, the Sooners went 32–1–1 and won two national championships. Had triple figures in tackles (104 and 123) his junior and senior seasons.

- Lee Roy Selmon (Eufaula; 1972)

Won the Outland and Lombardi awards his senior year at Oklahoma and started with his brother Dewey on three teams that went 32–1–1 and won two national titles. Is a member of both the college and pro football hall of fames. Played nine years with the Tampa Bay Buccaneers and was All-Pro three times.

- Steve Largent (Putnam City; 1972)

A Pro Football Hall of Famer who held six career pass receiving records when he retired from the NFL. He had the most receptions (819), most consecutive games with a reception (177), most yards on receptions (13,089), most receptions for TDs (101), most seasons with 50 or more receptions (10) and most seasons with 1,000 yards or more in receptions (8). Played in seven Pro Bowls and was All-Pro three times. Later represented Oklahoma in the U.S. House of Representatives.

- Pat Ryan (Putnam City; 1973)

Even though he was a good high school and college quarterback (Tennessee), Ryan made the biggest splash in professional football. He played 13 years in the NFL, 12 of them with the New York Jets. His best season was 1984 when he passed for nearly 2,000 yards and 14 touchdowns.

- Wilson Whitley (Brenham; 1973)

Whitley won the Lombardi Award while playing for the University of Houston in 1976. Played six years with the Cincinnati Bengals, including the 1981 season when the Bengals lost to the 49ers in Super Bowl XVI.

- Zac Henderson (Burkburnett; 1974)

Henderson was a four-year starter at safety for Oklahoma and tied the single-season interception record with seven in 1977. That year, he was named the nation's most outstanding defensive back. Played for the Eagles in the NFL and also played in the CFL, where he was once the defensive player of the year, and the USFL.

- Mike Renfro (Fort Worth Arlington Heights; 1974)

Renfro was a three-time All-Southwest Conference receiver at TCU who went on to play 10 seasons in the NFL, all in Texas. He played six years for the Houston Oilers and four years for the Dallas Cowboys, finishing with 323 catches for 4,708 yards.

- Art Briles (Rule; 1974)

Briles was one of the few Class B high school players who went on to start at a major college. After playing for University of Houston from 1974 to 1977, he made a name for himself in coaching, most notably at Stephenville High School, where he won four state championships in 12 years there.

- Kenny King (Clarendon; 1975)

After playing for OU in 1976–78, King played seasons in the NFL—six with the Raiders. He was a Pro Bowl running back in 1980.

- Rick Berns (Wichita Falls; 1975)

Set a school single-game record with 36 carries for 255 yards while playing running back at Nebraska. Inducted into the Cornhusker Hall of Fame in 1992 after running for 2,449 yards and 28 touchdowns in three college seasons. Won a Super Bowl championship ring with the Raiders when they beat Washington 38–9 in Super Bowl XVIII.

- J. C. Watts (Eufaula; 1976)

Played quarterback at OU for three seasons in which the Sooners went 32–4. But he made a name for himself in politics, serving four terms in the U.S. House of Representatives. In 1999, he served as chairman of the House Republican Conference, making him the fourth ranking Republican in the House at the time.

- Ray Berry (Abilene Cooper; 1982)

This Baylor linebacker played seven solid NFL seasons, six of them with the Minnesota Vikings.

- Patrick Graham (Choctaw; 1984)

He played WR and had over 50 yards and 1 touchdown

- Ray Crockett (Duncanville; 1985)

After playing college football at Baylor, Crockett played 14 seasons in the NFL and amassed 647 tackles and 36 interceptions. He started at safety on the Denver Broncos' back-to-back Super Bowl championship seasons of 1997 and 1998.

- James Dixon (Vernon; 1985)

After setting several receiving records catching passes in the University of Houston's heralded run-and-shoot offense, Dixon started two seasons (1989 and 1990) for the Dallas Cowboys. Holds the Cowboys' all-time record for the most receiving yards in one game by a rookie—203 against the Cardinals.

- Randy Gatewood (Wichita Falls Hirschi; 1991)

As a senior at Nevada-Las Vegas in 1995, Gatewood finished second in the NCAA Division I in receptions (88) and fifth in yards (1,203). He set an NCAA single-game record with 23 receptions and 363 yards against Nevada in 1994. From there, he became one of the top receivers in the Arena League playing for the Arizona Rattlers.

- Aaron Taylor (Wichita Falls Rider; 1993)

Played both guard and center for three national championship teams in four years at Nebraska. An All-American and the Outland Trophy winner as college football's best lineman in 1997.

- Skip Hicks (Burkburnett; 1993)

Set a school record at UCLA by running for 55 career touchdowns. Was the sixth all-time leading rusher in UCLA history with 3,373 yards and earned All-American honors his senior year (1997). Was the first player drafted by the Washington Redskins in 1998.

- Frank Middleton (Beaumont Westbrook; 1993)

After playing college football at Arizona, Middleton has played eight seasons in the NFL. Started all 16 games in the offensive line for Oakland when the Raiders won the AFC and went to the Super Bowl in 2002.

- Phil Dawson (Lake Highlands; 1993)

As a kicker, Dawson led the University of Texas in scoring for three straight seasons (1994–96), amassing 243 points.

- Kris Brown (Southlake Carroll; 1995)

Was the Nebraska kicker for four years and left as the Cornhuskers all-time leading scorer and the seventh leading scorer in NCAA history with 388 points. Set numerous kicking records at Nebraska, including making 57 of 77 field goals. Currently kicking for the Houston Texans.

- R. W. McQuarters (Tulsa Washington; 1995)

An outstanding kick returner and defensive back at Oklahoma State, McQuarters later played in the NFL for the New York Giants.

- Kelly Gregg (Edmond North; 1995)

After earning All-American honors on the Defensive Line at the University of Oklahoma, Gregg went on to play for the Baltimore Ravens. He is now one of the top noseguards in the NFL.

- Corey Ivy (Moore; 1995)

Corey played Defensive Back for the University of Oklahoma and is currently a fixture in the secondary with the Baltimore Ravens. He also returns kicks occasionally. Ivy won a Super Bowl with the Tampa Bay Buccaneers.

- John Fitzgerald (Putnam City North; 1995)

A 3x All-American on the Offensive Line at the University of Central Oklahoma, injury kept him from the NFL. Fitzgerald was named to the Lone Star Conference 75th Anniversary team in 2006.

- Rashaun Woods (OKC Millwood; 1999)

An All-American wide receiver at Oklahoma State, who caught 293 passes for 4,404 yards and 42 touchdowns for the Cowboys. Was the first round draft pick of the San Francisco 49ers in 2004.

- Jason White (Tuttle; 1999)

Despite coming off major surgeries on both knees, White had an incredible junior season at Oklahoma and won the Heisman Trophy in 2003. He completed 278 of 451 passes (61 percent) for 3,846 yards and 40 touchdowns and had a quarterback rating of 158.11.

- Felix Jones (Tulsa Washington – 2005)

Ran for 2,954 yards and 20 touchdowns and averaged 7.6 yards per carry in three seasons with the Arkansas Razorbacks. Was a consensus All American running back in 2007 and a No. 1 draft pick of the Dallas Cowboys in 2008. After playing 5 seasons with the Cowboys, Jones spent his final NFL season with the Pittsburgh Steelers in 2013.

=== Coaches ===
- Jess Neely (Rice; 1941)

Coached college football for 40 years and had a 207–176–19 record. Spent 27 of those years at Rice where he won four Southwest Conference championships and took the Owls to seven bowl games. Inducted into the College Football Hall of Fame in 1971.

- Dutch Meyer (TCU; 1942)

A College Football Hall of Fame coach who tutored quarterbacks Sammy Baugh and Davey O'Brien while at TCU. Coached TCU to a national title in 1938.

- Homer Norton (Texas A&M; 1943–46)

Coached Texas A&M to a national title in 1939. That year the Aggies outscored the opposition 198–18 in 10 games and edged Tulane 14–13 in the Sugar Bowl. Was 82–53–9 at A&M from 1934 to 1947. Inducted into the College Football Hall of Fame in 1971.

- Matty Bell (SMU; 1943)

This native of Haskell, Texas, coached SMU to a co-national championship and a Rose Bowl berth in 1935; finished with 153 victories and was inducted into the College Football Hall of Fame in 1955.

- Blair Cherry (Texas; 1944)

He coached Amarillo High School to three straight state championships in 1934, 1935 and 1936 and 84–5 in seven seasons with the Sandies. Joined Dana X Bible's staff at the University of Texas where he coached Tom Landry and Bobby Layne and became one of the pioneers of the T-formation. Later became head coach of the Longhorns and was 32–10–1 in four seasons.

- Bobby Dodd (Georgia Tech; 1944)

Inducted into the College Football Hall of Fame in 1993 after leading Georgia Tech to a 165–64–8 record in 22 seasons. Once had a 31-game win streak and an eight-game bowl win streak.

- Joe Golding (Wichita Falls; 1947-48-49-50-51)

Coached in five Oil Bowls during his 15 years at Wichita Falls High School. Golding had a record of 152–22–2 and won four state championships with the Coyotes. He was also instrumental in building the Memorial Stadium that the game is now played in.

- Gil Steinke (Texas A&I; 1960–67)

Coaches 23 years at Texas A&I in Kingsville and won six national championship in NAIA Division I. His record was 182–61–4. Was inducted into the College Football Hall of Fame in 1996, one year after his death.

- Grant Teaff (Baylor; 1964–71)

Was the head coach at McMurry and then Angelo State in his two Oil Bowls, but Teaff went on to make a name for himself at Baylor. The Bears were 7–43 in the five years before Teaff took over, but he won two Southwest Conference titles there and took them to eight bowl games. Inducted into the College Football Hall of Fame in 2001.

- Gordon Wood (Brownwood; 1977–85)

The legendary Texas high school coach won nine state championships, seven of those in his 26 seasons with Brownwood. Wood's coaching record from 1949 through 1985 was 396–91–15.

- Charlie Johnston (Childress; 1978)

Retired as the third winningest coach in Texas high school history with a 314–94–8 overall record in 36 years at Childress High School. First winner of the prestigious Tom Landry Award given by the Texas High School Coaches Association.

- Larry Coker (Claremore; 1978)

Coker started his career in Fairfax Oklahoma winning several state championships for the Red Devils in the 70's and then moved on to a long career as a college assistant coach before finally getting a chance to be a college head coach in 2001 at the University of Miami. Led the Hurricanes to a national championship his first season and posted a 35–3 record with three straight Bowl Championship Series appearances in his first three years.

- Joe Bob Tyler (Wichita Falls; 1979–85)

Was the first Texan to both play and coach in the Oil Bowl. Inducted into the athletic hall of fame at Northeast Louisiana University. Was the first head football coach at Wichita Falls Rider High School and went from there to Haltom High School and Wichita Falls High School.

- Frank Bevers (Dallas Highland Park; 1981)

Bevers was the head coach for the Dallas Highland Park Scots from 1974–1984 and from 1989–1992. His record at Highland Park was 134–43–1. Bevers was head coach for the Corpus Christi King Mustangs from 1967–1968. And Bevers was the head coach for the Mineral Wells Rams from 1971 to 1973. His overall record as a head coach was 158–68–2 https://www.uiltexas.org/files/media/Frank_Bevers_YBY.pdf

- G.A. Moore (Pilot Point; 1982)

The winningest coach in Texas high school history, Moore's current record is 404–80–9. He has coached at Bryson, Sherman, Celina and Pilot Point.

== Oil Bowl History ==
=== 1930s ===
1938: The first Oil Bowl matched Class B football stars from East and West Texas. The East wore the uniforms of the Wichita Falls High School varsity. The West wore the uniforms used by the junior varsity Rowdies. Jack "Jackrabbit" Crain of Nocona ran a punt back 55 yards for a touchdown in the final two minutes to give the West a 15–13 win. Carrol Wood of Cameron High School coached the East, and Volney Hill of Burkburnett coached the West in the inaugural game. Key players in the game were Preston Johnston of Newcastle, Cullen Rogers of Mart, Murray Evans of Burkburnett and Huck Schafer of Yoakum.

=== 1940s ===
1944: There was no Oil Bowl this year. Instead, Wichita Falls played host to the Texas High School Coaches Association's annual coaching school and with it, the North-South All-Star Game. But the Maskat Shrine Temple still records this game as an Oil Bowl. Blair Cherry was an assistant coach for the North and got to look at one of his future University of Texas stars, quarterback Bobby Layne of Highland Park. But a couple of guys from Goose Creek High stole the spotlight. George Walmsley threw a 25-yard touchdown pass to high school teammate Bill Taylor. Walmsley threw another TD pass, and Taylor set up another touchdown with a catch to help the South win 19–7.

1945: In the first Oil Bowl matching Texas vs. Oklahoma, August Pelz of Wichita Falls was the passing star in a 13–0 win for the Texans. Pelz set up Texas' first touchdown with a pair of 16 and 15-yard passes, first to Art Sweet of San Antonio Brackenridge and then to Sammie Pierce of Vernon. Pierce got the TD on a 9-yard run. The final TD was set up by a 50-yard pass from Pelz to Harold Clark of Highland Park. Bill Engle of Greenville scored from a yard out. Oklahoma only crossed midfield one time in the game.

1947: Texas' 14–0 win made it three straight shutouts over Oklahoma, but no defense has ever dominated a game like the Texans did in this one. Oklahoma had just 2 yards in total offense and only one first down. The Sooners were minus-7 yards on the ground and were 1-of-11 for 9 yards passing. Texas' offense, however, only had four first downs in the game. Corpus Christi quarterback Vernon Glass ran 12 yards on a touchdown and threw 12 yards to Kenneth Martin of Wichita Falls for another TD. The second TD came on a flea flicker when Glass took a lateral from Hayden Fry of Odessa before tossing the scoring pass. Fry also had a 9-yard run and threw a 16-yard pass in the first scoring drive.

1949: Gahlen Dinkle of Marshall set up one touchdown with a 40-yard punt return and scored another on a 5-yard run to lead Texas to a 39–7 rout. However, history was made when Oklahoma scored for the first time in the series on a touchdown pass from Eddie Crowder of Muskogee to Mac Odell of Watonga in the second quarter. Dinkle was named the outstanding back of the game. Bill Georges, a tackle from Fort Worth, was named the top lineman.

=== 1950s ===
1951: After helping Wichita Falls win back-to-back state championships in 1949 and 1950, speedy James Self had a big night in his final game at Coyote Stadium. Self contributed 134 yards of total offense in Texas' 20–6 Oil Bowl victory. He ran four times for 59 yards and caught two passes for 75 yards, and it was his 44-yard touchdown catch from quarterback Duane Nutt of Corsicana that sealed the deal in the fourth quarter. Max Boydston of Muskogee was voted Oklahoma's top back after a 71-yard rushing performance. Nutt was voted the top back of the game, for Texas, and Ed Bernet of Highland Park was the top lineman.

1952: Ronald Robbins, the son of Breckenridge coach Cooper Robbins, ran for one touchdown and threw for another in Texas' 18–6 win. Robbins threw 33 yards to Bob Wilson of Fort Worth Paschal for one touchdown and ran 4 yards for another. James Sides of Lubbock also scored for Texas on a short run, and Bill Pierce of Chickasha did the same for Oklahoma's only score. The game featured a 62-yard run by Austin High's Delano Womack, an Oil Bowl record that stood for 33 years.

1954: Ardmore quarterback Royce McQueen's 9-yard touchdown pass to Dean McMasters gave Oklahoma a 6–0 lead, but LaNoal Castleberry of Childress countered for Texas in the third quarter. That gave the Oil Bowl its first tie, 6–6. It was a game of errors. The two teams combined for a dozen turnovers – seven pass interceptions and five fumbles.

1957: History was made—thanks to fullback Ronnie Hartline of Lawton. Oklahoma won over Texas for the first time in 13 meetings, 21–7. Hartline carried 26 times for 73 yards and a touchdown and kicked all three extra points. He was voted the outstanding back of the game, ahead of Texas' talented Glynn Gregory of Abilene.

=== 1960s ===
In the 1965 game, Bill Bradley, Jerry Levias, and Chris Gilbert contributed to Texas' 21–13 victory. James Harris rushed for 81 yards and recorded two receptions for 17 yards, including one touchdown. For Oklahoma, Mike Arnold and San Toi Dubose scored the team's touchdowns.

1966: Bub Deerinwater of Wichita Falls Rider played his final game before the hometown fans and ran for 54 yards on 11 carries, scored on a 7-yard run and kicked both extra point in Texas' 14–0 win. However, Linzy Cole of Dallas Madison was the offensive MVP after rushing for 44 yards in 12 carries. Chuck Hixson of San Antonio Highlands started at quarterback for Texas but was knocked out of the game on a vicious tackle by future Heisman Trophy winner Steve Owens of Miami. James Street, who led the University of Texas to a national championship in 1969, replaced Hixson. Danny Cantrell of McKinney led the Texas defense with 12 tackles. Owens gained all but four of his team's 45 rushing yards on 18 carries.

1968: Jack Mildren of Abilene Cooper completed 15 of 19 passes for 251 yards and four touchdowns in Texas' 39–7 rout. Mildren completed the first 12 passes he threw in the game. He threw two touchdown passes of 10 and 21 yards to Gordon Gilder of Kountze, a 28-yarder to Riley Odoms of Corpus Christi and a 27-yarder to Mike Lowrey of Wichita Falls High. Si Southall of Brownwood took over for Mildren in the fourth quarter and led Texas to two more TDs. Roosevelt Manning of Wichita Falls Washington was voted the top lineman of the game after helping the Texas defense hold All-American Roy Bell of Clinton to only 38 yards rushing.

1969: Clinton's James Williams carried 30 times for 115 yards and two touchdowns to lead Oklahoma to a 17–7 upset. Led by MVP Raymond Hamilton of Oklahoma City Douglass, Oklahoma's defense held Texas to just 9 yards of total offense. The biggest name to come out of this game was Jerry Sisemore of Plainview, who went on to become an All-American at Texas and an All-Pro offensive lineman with the Philadelphia Eagles.

=== 1970s ===
1971: Haskell's Charlie Franklin and Wichita Falls High's Lawrence Williams led a Texas defense that intercepted five Oklahoma passes in a 15–0 win. Franklin, the defensive MVP, returned one interception 45 yards for a touchdown and was named the defensive MVP. Mike Thomas of Greenville scored on a 33-yard run and was named the offensive MVP. Grant Teaff, who would go on to become a legendary coach at Baylor, was one of the Texas coaches. The fans who witnessed this game, however, will not remember it for Franklin, Williams, Thomas, Teaff or even the final score. This one will be remembered for a murder than occurred in the north end zone of Coyote Stadium during the opening quarter. E.J. Young, a 47-year-old employee of Maskat Shrine Temple, was shot three times and killed.

1972: Marty Akins of Gregory-Portland threw a 17-yard touchdown pass to Ronnie Littleton of Wichita Falls with 1:22 to play and then hooked up with Dallas Carter's Joe Rust for the two-point conversion to rally Texas to a thrilling 21–20 win. This came against an Oklahoma defense that had Dewey and Lee Roy Selmon of Eufaula and Jimbo Elrod of Tulsa East Central. Oklahoma also had offensive starts. Tony Brantley of Oklahoma City threw two touchdown passes—a 2-yarder to Tinker Owens of Miami and a 42-yarder to Steve Largent of Putnam City. Littleton was voted the game's MVP after rushing for 127 yards and catching the winning TD pass.

1974: Rodney Allison of Odessa High threw two touchdown passes of 58 and 20 yards to Mike Renfro of Fort Worth Arlington Heights and also scored on a 19-yard bootleg to lead Texas to a 20–13 win. Wes Hankins of Bristow and Kyle Phillips of Woodward threw TD passes for Oklahoma in the game, but Carl McCormack of Fort Worth Southwest intercepted Phillips in the end zone late in the game to preserve the Texas victory. Allison and Renfro shared the offensive MVP. Oklahoma's Jeff Ward of Moore was the defensive MVP. Zac Henderson of Burkburnett, who would go on to star as a defensive back for Oklahoma, averaged 46.4 per punt on five kicks and landed several inside the Oklahoma 20.

1975: In the first Oil Bowl played on the artificial turf of Memorial Stadium, Kenneth King of Clarendon ran for 140 yards and was instrumental in all three touchdown drives that gave Texas a 20–6 win. Two players off Wichita Falls Rider's 11–1 team of 1974 scored touchdowns for Texas. Brian Nelson had a 60-yard touchdown reception, and quarterback Mike Patterson ran 24 yards for a score. King was the offensive MVP, and linebacker David Hodge of Brazoswood was the defensive MVP.

1976: Quarterback Darrol Ray of Killeen directed first half touchdown drives of 76, 38, 71 and 72 yards as Texas won 37–28. J. C. Watts of Eufaula quarterbacked Oklahoma in the game and threw a 38-yard pass to Kenneth Blair to set up his team's first TD. Freddie Hurd broke an Oil Bowl record with a 77-yard touchdown run. Ray was the offensive MVP, and Lance Taylor of El Paso Coronado was the defensive MVP.

1977: Legendary coach Gordon Wood of Brownwood predicted an explosive offensive show in this game. He was half right. Darrell Shepard of Odessa completed nine of 17 passes for 182 yards and two touchdowns to lead Texas to a 34–8 rout. Shepard threw TD passes to Eric Herring and Tim Orr, while the Texas defense—led by Will Rub, Tim McCollum, David Taveirne, David Darr and Doug Carr, kept Oklahoma off the scoreboard until the final minute.

=== 1980s ===
1989: Sugar Land Willowridge cornerback William Shankle intercepted two passes—returning one for a touchdown—in Texas' 33–0 blowout. Chad Hunter of Garland Lakeview also returned an interception for a touchdown. J.J. Joe of Arlington Lamar threw a 73-yard TD pass to Copperas Cove's Mike Davis and scored on a 1-yard run. Hoss Hudson Of Decatur ran 12 times for 112 yards and two touchdown's to win offensive MVP honors. Shankle was the defensive MVP.

=== 1990s ===
1995: Kris Brown of Southlake Carroll would go on to kick for national championship teams at Nebraska and after that, the NFL. But he had a miserable Oil Bowl. Brown missed field attempts of 39 and 42 yards in the final three minutes to let Oklahoma escape with a 12–10 win. It wasn't a good night for either offense. Texas had only 90 yards rushing in 39 attempts and 63 yards passing on 5-of-14. Oklahoma ran 28 times and gained just 74 yards and completed just 9-of-24 passes. Justin Fuente of Tulsa Union was the offensive MVP after throwing for one touchdown. Marvell Galloway of Broken Brown was named defensive MVP with five tackles and two sacks.

1996: Jersey Village's Darrell Bush ran 22 times for 121 yards and a touchdown to lead Texas to a 36–0 rout. Garry Zimmerman of Wichita Falls High School caught four passes for 58 yards and two TDs. Mike Knepper, an end from Garland, was named the defensive MVP. He led a defense that limited Oklahoma to 136 total yards and only once allowed the Sooners inside the Texas 25-yard line.

1997: Jarrod Reese didn't get to take a snap until there were just 38 seconds left in the first half. But after that, the game belonged to him. The Seminole quarterback accounted for 250 yards of offense in Oklahoma's convincing 42–21 win. The unanimous offensive MVP ran for two touchdowns, threw for two touchdowns and set up another score with a long pass. Reese completed 6 of 11 passes for 161 yards and ran 13 times for 89 yards. His TD runs were for 1 and 7 yards. He threw a 40-yard touchdown pass to Ahmed Kabba of Westmoore on his first play from scrimmage and later hit J.T. Thatcher of Norman with a 42-yarder. In between he set up a touchdown with a 39-yard pass to Donald Shoals of Enid. Killeen Ellison's David Winbush ran for 93 yards with 70 of it coming on a fumble recovery for a touchdown. Bary Holleyman, a tackle from Putnam City North, was the defensive MVP.

1999: Oklahoma closed out the 20th century with a 41–13 blowout. Chris Massey of Spiro scored the game's first touchdown on a flashy 13-yard reverse and then finished it with a 57-yard punt return for a TD in the fourth quarter. In between, Tulsa Union quarterback Josh Blankenship was the star or the show with two touchdown passes—a 5-yarder to Josh Tucker of Moore and a 14-yarder to Thomas Hill of Tulsa Hale. Future Heisman Trophy winner Jason White of Tuttle threw a 21-yard TD pass to Tucker. Tye Strickland of Southlake Carroll set an Oil Bowl receiving record with eight catches for 139 yards, but Massey and Blankenship shared the offensive MVP honor, while linebacker Gregory Richmond of Oklahoma City Douglass was the defensive MVP.

=== 2000s ===
2006: Texas claimed a 17–0 shutout, limiting the Oklahoma team to only 89 total yards. The Texas defense was led by MVP Jeremy Beal of Carrollton Creekview. The offensive MVP honor went to running back Dimitri Nance of Euless Trinity. He had 108 yards rushing on 19 carries and caught two passes for 22 yards. Justin Fenty scored Texas' first touchdown on a 12-yard pass. The other touchdown came on an 18-yard fumble return by Kinzey Joiner.

== Oil Bowl Hall of Fame ==
Oil Bowl Hall of Fame Inductees
1991 Inductees: Dave Parks; Harold "Pee Wee" Park; C.D. Knight; Harold Story; C.W. Muehlberger; Bill Lee; 1992 Inductees: Tom Darling; W.A. "Pete" Spoonts; Cecil P. Rogers; Charles Percifield; Bill Mercer; 1993 Inductees: Bobby Boyd; Dr. Ted Alexander, Sr.; Dr. Ted Alexander, Jr.; Dr. Jerry Alexander; Dr. Eldo Jones; Dr. Max Brazil; Dr. David Borman; Dr. Michael Sheen; Dr. Brian Hull; Bobby Burross; 1994 Inductees: Joe Parker; Jack Crain; Elmer Brown	1995 Inductees: Jack Mildren; Troy Stewart; Bobby Evans; 1996 Inductees: Mickey Maroney; Joe Keesee; 1997 Inductees: Dick Harris; Steve Bailey; Tommy Patrey; Ray Winkels; Ronnie Awtry; 1998 Inductees: Rick Berns; 1999 Inductees: Mike Renfro; Joe Kirk; Ralph Gould; Tommy Keesee	2000 Inductees: Joe Bob Tyler; Nick Gholson; Robert Forster; Andy Toth; 2001 Inductee: Hayden Fry; 2002 Inductee: Bob Kalsu; 2003 Inductee: Skip Hicks; 2004 Inductees: Jay Wilkerson; Billy Bookout; 2005 Inductees: Grant Teaff; Jim Dillard	2006 Inductees: Byron Townsend; Jerry Levias; 2007 Inductees: J. C. Watts; Chuck Curtis; Dr. Willy Pino; 2008 Inductees: Lindy Berry; Homer B. Johnson; Dick Lowe; 2009 Inductees: Jim Davis; Charles Milstead; 2010 Inductees: Kris Brown; Milt Bassett; 2011 Inductees: Bob Ledbetter; 2012 Inductees: Joe Golding; 2013 Inductees: TRN; KAUZ; KFDX; Townsquare Media; Cumulus Broadcasting; 2014 Inductees: Bill Miller
Source: The Official Oil Bowl Website
