= John Wesley Fitzgerald =

John Wesley Fitzgerald may refer to:

- John Wesley Fitzgerald (politician, born 1850), American businessman and member of the Michigan House of Representatives
- John Wesley Fitzgerald (politician, born 1990), his great-great-grandson, member of the Michigan House of Representatives

== See also ==
- John Fitzgerald (disambiguation)
