= Moonan =

Moonan may refer to:

- Moonan Brook, a stream in New South Wales, Australia
- Moonan Flat, a village in New South Wales, Australia
- John Moonan Fitzgerald (1923–2008), American politician and jurist
