= James FitzGerald =

James FitzGerald or James Fitzgerald may refer to:

== Irish nobility ==
- James Fitzedmund Fitzgerald (died 1589), hereditary Seneschal of Imokilly
- James FitzMaurice FitzGerald (died 1579), member of the 16th century ruling Geraldine dynasty
- James FitzGerald (Ratoath MP) (fl.1689), Irish politician, MP for Ratoath 1689
- James FitzGerald (Inistioge MP) (fl.1689), Irish politician, MP for Inistioge 1689
- James Fitzgerald (1742–1835), Irish politician
- James FitzGerald, 1st Duke of Leinster (1722–1773), Irish nobleman and politician
- James FitzGerald-Kenney (1878–1956), Irish politician
- James Gubbins Fitzgerald (1852–1926), medical practitioner and an Irish nationalist politician

=== Earls ===
- James FitzGerald, 1st Earl of Desmond (c.1570–1601), Irish nobleman
- James FitzGerald, 6th Earl of Desmond (died 1463)
- James FitzGerald, 8th Earl of Desmond (1459–1487)
- James FitzGerald, 10th Earl of Desmond (died 1529), Earl of Desmond
- James FitzGerald, de jure 12th Earl of Desmond (died 1540)
- James FitzGerald, 13th Earl of Desmond (died 1558), Irish nobleman
- James FitzThomas FitzGerald (died c.1608), the Sugán Earl, Earl of Desmond

== Other politicians ==
- James FitzGerald (New Zealand politician) (1818–1896), New Zealand politician
- James Fitzgerald (American jurist, born 1851) (1851–1922), New York lawyer, politician, and judge
- James F. Fitzgerald (1895–1975), New York state senator (1949–1952)

== Sportspeople ==
- James Fitzgerald (athlete) (1883–?), Canadian Olympic athlete
- James Fitzgerald (Australian cricketer) (1874–1950), Australian cricketer
- James Fitzgerald (English cricketer) (1945–2013), English cricketer
- James Fitzgerald (New Zealand cricketer) (1862–1943), New Zealand cricketer
- Jamie Fitzgerald (American football) (born 1965), American football defensive back
- Jamie Fitzgerald (rugby league) (born 1979), rugby league player
- Jim Fitzgerald (footballer) (1924–2003), Australian footballer
- Jim Fitzgerald (racing driver) (1921–1987), American racing driver
- Jim Fitzgerald (rugby union) (1928–1993), New Zealand rugby union player
- Jim Fitzgerald (American football) (1907–1978), American football player

== Others ==
- James Newbury FitzGerald (1837–1907), American bishop
- James FitzGerald (artist) (1910–1973), American artist
- James E. FitzGerald, 4th president of Fairfield University from 1958 to 1964
- James Martin Fitzgerald (1920–2011), American judge
- Jim Fitzgerald (businessman) (James Francis Fitzgerald, 1926–2012), American businessman and philanthropist
- James Edward Fitzgerald (bishop) (1938–2003), American Roman Catholic bishop
- James R. Fitzgerald (born 1953), American criminal profiler and forensic linguist
- James L. Fitzgerald, Indologist at Brown University
- James FitzGerald (writer), Canadian writer
- James Fitzgerald (1891–1959), Irish hermit known as Lackendarra Jim

== Fictional characters ==
- James "Jim" Fitzgerald, a character from Grand Theft Auto: The Lost and Damned
