= Frank Fitzgerald (disambiguation) =

Frank Fitzgerald (1885–1939) was Governor of Michigan.

Frank Fitzgerald or Frank FitzGerald may also refer to:

- Frank T. Fitzgerald (1857–1907), U.S. Representative from New York
- Frank M. Fitzgerald (1955–2004), American lawyer and politician
- Frank Fitzgerald (Wisconsin politician), Irish-born Wisconsin politician
- Frank Fitzgerald (American football), American football executive
- Franky Fitzgerald, fictional character in Skins
- Franklin Fitzgerald, anchor for NASA Edge
- Frank FitzGerald (judge), American football player and judge

== See also ==
- Francis Fitzgerald (disambiguation)
- Frances FitzGerald (disambiguation)
