= Paul Fitzgerald =

Paul Fitzgerald may refer to:

- Paul Fitzgerald (actor) (born 1970), American actor
- Paul Fitzgerald (painter) (1922–2017), Australian portrait painter
- Paul Fitzgerald (born 1961), English cartoonist known as Polyp
- Paul Fitzgerald (journalist), American journalist
- Paul Fitzgerald (Gaelic footballer), Irish Gaelic football player
- Paul Fitzgerald (boxer), Irish Olympic boxer
- Paul J. Fitzgerald, Roman Catholic priest and president of the University of San Francisco
- Paudie Fitzgerald, Irish cyclist
