= Peter Fitzgerald =

Peter Fitzgerald may refer to:

- Sir Peter FitzGerald, 1st Baronet (1808–1880), Anglo-Irish nobleman
- Peter Fitzgerald (actor) (born 1962), American actor
- Peter Fitzgerald (athlete) (born 1953), Australian former sprinter
- Peter FitzGerald (businessman), Irish businessman, founder of Randox
- Peter Fitzgerald (footballer) (1937–2013), former Irish football player
- Peter FitzGerald, Irish commissioner and author of the FitzGerald Report on the assassination of Rafic Hariri
- Peter Fitzgerald (politician) (born 1960), United States Senator from Illinois, 1999–2005
- Peter Fitzgerald (rugby league) (born 1951), Australian rugby league player

== See also ==
- Peter Fitzgerald-Moore (1919–2004), British Canadian geologist, environmentalist and political activist
