= Ryan Fitzgerald =

Ryan Fitzgerald may refer to:

- Ryan Fitzgerald (American football) (born 2000), American football player
- Ryan Fitzgerald (baseball) (born 1994), American baseball player
- Ryan Fitzgerald (footballer) (born 1976), Australian rules footballer
- Ryan Fitzgerald (ice hockey) (born 1994), American ice hockey player

== See also ==
- Fitzgerald (surname)
