= Amnesty International UK Media Awards 2012 =

British journalism award

The Amnesty International UK Media Awards 2012 recognised excellence in human rights journalism across print, broadcast and digital media. Entries for the awards opened in December 2011, the short-list was published 25 April 2012 and the winners were revealed on 29 May 2012.

A total of 12 awards were resented in the following categories: Digital Media, Documentary, The Gaby Rado Memorial Award, International TV and Radio, Magazine (Consumer), Magazine (Newspaper Supplement), National Newspaper, Nations and Regions, Photojournalism, Radio, Student Human Rights Reporter Award and TV News.

The awards took place at the British Film Institute (BFI) in central London and the ceremony was hosted by Dermot Murnaghan.

== 2012 Awards ==
The winners and runners up were:

2012
Category	Title	Organisation	Journalists	Refs
Digital media
Digital media	Deaths in custody: a case to answer	The Bureau of Investigative Journalism	Iain Overton, Angus Stickler, Dan Bell, Charlie Mole	
Digital media	The Execution of Troy Davis	The Guardian	Ed Pilkington, Guardian Digital Team	
Digital media	Voices from Dark Places: Exposing the Crimes of the Assad Regime	Al Jazeera	Annasofie Flamand, Hugh Macleod	
Digital media	Judges: Anna Doble, Wesley Johnson, Sam Strudwick, Jody Thompson			
Documentary
Documentary	Enemies of the People (Voices from The Killing Fields)	More4	Rob Lemkin, Stefan Ronowicz, Thet Sambath	
Documentary	Give up Tomorrow	BBC4 Storyville	Michael Collins, Nick Fraser, Eric Daniel Metzgar, Marty Syjuco	
Documentary	Sri Lanka's Killing Fields	ITN Productions for Channel 4	Callum Macrae, Chris Shaw, Jon Snow	
Documentary	Judges: John Amaechi, Mike Blakemore, Clemency Burton-Hill, Alison Rooper, Kim Sengupta			
Gaby Rado; Memorial Award
Gaby Rado; Memorial Award	Horror in Homs	Channel 4 News	Mani	
Gaby Rado; Memorial Award	"Midnight's Children"; "Kenya is on the Brink of its own Disaster"; "'Bridenapping': A Growing Hidden Crime"	Independent on Sunday	Emily Dugan	
Gaby Rado; Memorial Award	Nigeria: Sex, Lies and Black Magic; Uganda's Miracle Babies; Honduras: Diving into Danger	Channel 4 Unreported World	Jenny Kleeman	
Gaby Rado; Memorial Award	Judges: Mike Blakemore, Janet Murray, Louis Rado, Ritula Shah, Jon Snow			
International TV and Radio
International TV and Radio	Bahrain: Shouting in the Dark	Al Jazeera English	Jon Blair, May Ying Welsh	
International TV and Radio	Assignment: Blasphemy – A Matter of Life and Death	BBC World Service	Caroline Finnigan, Bridget Harney, Jill McGivering, Bushra Taskeen	
International TV and Radio	Death in the Desert: A CNN Freedom Project Documentary	CNN	Sheri England, Mohamed Fahmy, Tim Lister, Earl Nurse, Frederik Pleitgen	
International TV and Radio	Judges: Jane Corbin, Mark Galloway, Flora Hunter, Sean Ryan, Thomas Schultz-Jagow			
Magazines: Consumer
Magazines: Consumer	Nature's defenders	New Internationalist	Vanessa Baird	
Magazines: Consumer	The Art Issue: "Art or Vandalism?"; Russia's Robin Hood "China's New Deal"	Index on Censorship	Yasmine El Rashidi, Nick Sturdee; Nick Sturdee; Simon Kirby	
Magazines: Consumer	Judges: Richard Horton, Maggie Paterson, Rod Stanley, Emma Tucker, Jenny Wood			
Magazines: Newspaper supplements
Magazines: Newspaper supplements	The rape of men	Observer Magazine	Will Storr	
Magazines: Newspaper supplements	1,000,000 Ghosts of Baghdad	Mail on Sunday; Live Magazine	Evan Williams	
Magazines: Newspaper supplements	Judges: Richard Horton, Maggie Paterson, Rod Stanley, Emma Tucker, Jenny Wood			
National Newspapers
National Newspapers	"In Europe's last dictatorship all opposition is mercilessly crushed"; "'My husband phoned to say he was going to the sauna ... we never saw him again'" RBS Helped Bankroll Europe's Last Dictatorship	The Independent	Jerome Taylor	
National Newspapers	Investigation into Undercover; Policing of Protest	The Guardian	Paul Lewis, Rob Evans	
National Newspapers	We live in fear of a massacre	The Sunday Times	Marie Colvin	
National Newspapers	Judges: Mike Blakemore, Jemima Khan, Iain Overton, Michelle Stanistreet, Joel Taylor			
Nations and Regions
Nations and Regions	Gaddafi's Secret Policemen; Came to Talk to Me	Sunday Herald	David Pratt	
Nations and Regions	Torso in the Thames	ITV London Tonight	Ronke Phillips, Faye Nickolds	
Nations and Regions	Women of the World's Slums	Sunday Herald	David Pratt	
Nations and Regions	Judges: David Cornock, Helena Drakakis, Mike Gilson, Shabnum Mustapha, Naresh Puri			
Photojournalism
Photojournalism	A place to stay – Dale Farm	The Times	Mary Turner	
Photojournalism	Human Rights Abuses in Egypt	NUJ Egyptian revolution exhibition	Lewis Whyld	
Photojournalism	The Rattle Of War And The Pain Of Hunger	The Guardian	Robin Hammond	
Photojournalism	Judges: Stuart Freedman, Colin Jacobson, Jenny Matthews, Maggie Paterson, Kelly Preedy			
Radio
Radio	Afghanistan: Counting the Cost	BBC Radio 4 Today and The World Tonight	Nina Manwaring, Ceri Thomas, Mike Thomson	
Radio	Victoria Derbyshire in Guantanamo Bay	BBC Radio 5 Live	Victoria Derbyshire, Louisa Compton	
Radio	Judges: Jane Anderson, Mike Blakemore, Henry Bonsu, Mariella Frostrup			
Student Human Rights; Reporter Award
Student Human Rights; Reporter Award	The curious case of John Oguchuckwu	The Glasgow Guardian	Amy Mackinnon	
Student Human Rights; Reporter Award	Democracy Criminalised in East Jerusalem	Brig Newspaper (Stirling University's Online Student Voice)	Boel Marcks Von Wurtemberg	
Student Human Rights; Reporter Award	Living in Exile	Life 360: Cardiff University's International Journalism Magazine	Paul Dharamraj	
Student Human Rights; Reporter Award	Judges: Nes Cazimoglu, Sean Coughlan, Guy Gunaratne, Hannah Livingstone, Sophie Mei Lan, Yasser Ranjha, Hannah Shaw			
Television News
Television News	Battle for Misrata	ITV News	John Irvine, Arti Lukha, Sean Swan, Tim Singleton, Deborah Turness	
Television News	Horror in Homs	Channel 4 News	Agnieszka Liggett, "Mani", Jonathan Miller, Nevine Mabro, Teresa Smith	
Television News	Undercover in Homs	BBC Newsnight	Sue Lloyd-Roberts, Amanda Gunn	
Television News	Judges: Mike Blakemore, Lyse Doucet, Julie Etchingham, Tim Miller, Mike Radford			
