= New Internationalist =

British independent periodical

- May–June 2019 (issue 519) cover
- Co-editors: Amy Hall, Nick Dowson, Conrad Landin, Bethany Rielly, Decca Muldowney
- Categories: Global justice, radical media, independent media
- Frequency: 6 issues/year
- Publisher: New Internationalist Publications Limited
- Paid circulation: 25,000
- Founded: 1973
- First issue: March 1973
- Country: United Kingdom
- Based in: Oxford, England
- Language: English
- Website: www.newint.org
- ISSN: 0305-9529

New Internationalist (NI) is an international publisher and left-wing magazine based in Oxford, England, owned by a multi-stakeholder co-operative and run day to day as a worker-run co-operative with a non-hierarchical structure. Known for its strong editorial and environmental policies, and its bi-monthly independent magazine, it describes itself as existing to "cover stories the mainstream media sidestep and provide alternative perspectives on today's global critical issues." It covers social and environmental issues through its magazine, books and digital platforms.

New Internationalist magazine has existed for more than 40 years and as of 2018 was the largest magazine of its type in circulation in the United Kingdom. It has won the Utne Independent Press Award for "Best International Coverage" eight times, most recently in 2013 and an Amnesty International UK Media Awards 2012 award in the consumer magazine category as well as being recognised by the United Nations for its "outstanding contribution to world peace and development".

In 2017, New Internationalist ran a Community Share Offer in which 3,409 people invested £704,114 to create a new multi-stakeholder [Co-operative] called New Internationalist Co-operative. In March of that year New Internationalist published the 500th issue of New Internationalist magazine.

In 2026 New Internationalist launched a fundraising campaign under the strapline "Save New Internationalist -- More than a magazine" aiming to raise £150,000 due to a cashflow crisis caused by rising print, paper and postage costs.

== Publisher ==
New Internationalist magazine is published by New Internationalist Publications Limited, a co-operative-run publisher based in Oxford, United Kingdom.

New Internationalist magazine was co-sponsored by Oxfam, Christian Aid and the Cadbury and Rowntree trusts and the magazine is funded through subscriptions, advertisements, and product sales.

New Internationalist has produced films, books and other materials for various United Nations agencies and related bodies concerned with world development. The book publisher Myriad Editions merged with New Internationalist in 2017.

New Internationalist runs a number of mail-order outlets for NGOs, charities and campaigning organisations. These include Amnesty International UK, Friends of the Earth UK and the Ethical Shop in the United Kingdom; and the New Internationalist North America shop in the United States of America and Canada.

== History ==
=== Origins ===
New Internationalist magazine was launched as a monthly magazine in 1973. Its forerunner was The Internationalist, sent to members of the student development organisation Third World First, since renamed People & Planet.

It was set up with financial help from two UK NGOs, Oxfam and Christian Aid, who wanted to encourage more people to understand the processes of "development" by publishing a monthly magazine to discuss and debate development issues in an accessible way. They formed a new publishing company, Devopress, with a subvention of £50,000 for the period 1973–76. Devopress comprised three Christian Aid directors and three from Oxfam. The board took a lively interest in the editorial and marketing of the magazine, although the editorial line was independent.

Early issues of New Internationalist magazine included a feature on the Tan-Zam railway in Tanzania, interviews with President Kaunda of Zambia and Bishop Helder Camara in Brazil, and features on Vietnam, drought in the Sahel, and the legacy of Che Guevara. It was an issue of New Internationalist magazine, in August 1973, that first drew attention to the irresponsible marketing of baby milk in the Third World by multinational companies.

=== 1970s–1990s ===
In the early 1970s, there was a significant public interest in the relationship between the West and developing countries highlighted by issues such as the Vietnam War, armed conflict during the decolonization of Africa, The "Green Revolution", African Socialism, Cuban domestic and foreign policy under Fidel Castro and in Communist China under Mao Zedong, issues about trickle-down economics, etc.

New Internationalist magazine published articles about all of these topics. It aimed to offer readers "a radical analysis of rich-poor world relationships, looking critically at the effects of aid programmes, for example, and providing a refreshing alternative to the mainstream development and news channels, and mainstream media".

Its strapline at the time was "the people, the ideas and the action in the fight for world development".

New Internationalist came close to bankruptcy when postal charges almost doubled in 1975. The publisher was rescued by funding from groups including Cadbury's and Rowntree's trusts, the Methodist church in the UK, Community Aid Abroad in Australia and Oxfam-Quebec in Canada..

In 1974 New Internationalist was commissioned by the United Nations Population Fund (UNFPA) to produce a kit of materials to mark World Population Year. In the following years New Internationalist produced press kits for the World Health Organization, the United Nations Environment Programme and the UN Children's Fund and participated in BBC television's Global Report series.

By the 1980s, marketing efforts focused on gaining subscriptions (in particular by Direct Debit) rather than on newsstand sales had resulted in a financially stable company. The organization was able purchase premises.

In 1982, New Internationalist began publishing a One World Calendar, with a number of other organizations. In 1987, New Internationalist became an equal pay co-operative. In 1988 New Internationalist started a mail-order operation.

In 1993, the magazine switched to full-colour printing and it was printed on recycled paper by 1999.

In the late 1990s New Internationalist set up its website newint.org, originally hosted by oneworld.org.

=== Recent history ===
In 2017, New Internationalist ran a Community Share Offer in which 3,409 people invested £704,114 to create a new multi-stakeholder Co-operative called New Internationalist Co-operative.

In April 2017, New Internationalist magazine had a circulation of 25,000, down from a peak of 75,000 at the turn of the millennium.

In September 2018, New Internationalist magazine was redesigned. Since then it has been published bi-monthly, six times a year, with its size doubled to 84 pages.

New Internationalist publishes a range of books and calendars. In 2017, New Internationalist acquired the Brighton-based publisher Myriad Editions. New Internationalist also runs a mail order-business called Ethical Shop and has run Amnesty International UK's mail order operation since 1999.

A second Community Share Offer was launched in 2021 in the wake of the financial impact of the COVID-19 pandemic, with the slogan "Save Our Stories" and a target of £350,000.

== Further information ==
=== Organizational structure ===
When New Internationalist started, the company operated as a conventional hierarchical organization, albeit with much sharing and teamwork.

In 1976 a more co-operative approach was adopted and developed over the years so that, although legally it was a limited company owned by the original shareholders, Peter and Lesley Adamson, the NI operated as a collective, with decision-making shared by all members on an equal footing.

In 1987 New Internationalist became an equal pay co-operative.

Eventually the Adamsons transferred their ownership of the limited company, now called New Internationalist Publications Limited, to a trust called New Internationalist Trust. The trust was 2/3 controlled by the company's employees who became trustees automatically while 1/3 of votes were held by co-opted Advisory trustees.

In 2018 the Trust was replaced by a multi-stakeholder co-operative, following a successful Community Share Offer.

=== Editorial policy ===
Several changes in the editorial approach of New Internationalist magazine have taken place since its founding.

Although its left-wing, libertarian socialist-leaning editorial line has remained broadly unchanged the approach has been modified over the years. New internationalist magazine nowadays is less Eurocentric and reflects broader concerns with environmental, gender and cultural angles in addition to social, economic and political ones. The magazine aims to reflect the views and concerns of its overseas subscribers as well as those in the UK. There is considerable emphasis on finding women contributors and writers and photographers from the South.

In its early days, a wide range of subjects were covered in each issue. In 1976 this changed and since then each month's edition has been devoted to one particular subject (for example Islam or World Food) to give the reader a comprehensive guide and analysis.

Some magazines are specially produced to tie in with campaigns. There have been issues on East Timor, Western Sahara, Cambodia, Burma, Fair trade (coffee, bananas and cocoa), homelessness, Jubilee 2000 and UN Sanctions on Iraq.

The use of the term "Third World", more or less unknown when the magazine started, is debated now and discarded by some. Terms such as "Majority World" and "Global South" have become more widespread. "Development" and "sustainable development" similarly are contentious to some people but the magazine still uses them as useful shorthand phrases. Reflecting this change, the magazine altered its strapline, which read "the people, the ideas, the action in the fight for global justice" until 2018.

In 2018 following a redesign of the magazine, the strapline was changed to "The World Unspun".

== See also ==
- P. J. Polyp
- New Internationalist Australia
