= Fitzcarraldo (disambiguation) =

Fitzcarraldo is a 1982 film by Werner Herzog.

Fitzcarraldo may also refer to:

- Fitzcarraldo, 1982 soundtrack album to the Werner Herzog film
- Fitzcarraldo (1995), second studio album by the Frames, an Irish rock band
- MV Fitzcarraldo, a cargo and passenger ship adapted into a touring performance venue by the theatre company Walk the Plank
- Fitzcarraldo Editions, British book publisher

== See also ==
- "Fatzcarraldo", 14th episode of season 28 of the animated television series The Simpsons
- Fitzcarrald District, a district of the Manú Province in Peru
- FitzGerald (disambiguation)
