= Robert Fitzgerald (disambiguation) =

Robert Fitzgerald (1910–1985) was an American classicist and translator of ancient Greek and Latin

Robert Fitzgerald may also refer to:

- Robert FitzGerald (1637–1698), Irish MP for Kildare County
- Robert FitzGerald (1654–1718), Irish MP for Castlemartyr and Youghal
- Robert FitzGerald (1671–1725), Irish MP for Charleville
- Robert FitzGerald, 19th Earl of Kildare (1675–1743), Irish peer
- Robert FitzGerald, 17th Knight of Kerry (1717–1781), Irish MP for Dingle
- Lord Robert Stephen FitzGerald (1765–1833), 6th son of James FitzGerald, 1st Duke of Leinster, and British diplomat in Switzerland 1792–1795
- Robert Uniacke Fitzgerald (1771–1842), Irish MP for Cork County, 1797
- Robert Lewis Fitzgerald (1776–1844), Royal Navy officer
- Robert Fitzgerald (pastoralist) (1807–1865), Australian pastoralist and politician
- Robert D. FitzGerald (1830–1892), Irish-Australian botanist and surveyor
- R. D. Fitzgerald (1902–1987), Australian poet and grandson of the above botanist/surveyor
- Robert Allan Fitzgerald (1834–1881), English cricketer
- Robert Fitzgerald (Australian politician) (1846–1933), New South Wales parliamentarian
- Robert Fitzgerald (speed skater) (1923–2005), American speed skater
- Bob Fitzgerald (basketball) (1923–1983), American basketball player
- Bob Fitzgerald (born 1968), sports commentator

== See also ==
- Robert Fitzgerald Prosody Award, an award given to scholars who have made a lasting contribution to the art and science of versification
