= Casey Fitzgerald =

Casey Fitzgerald may refer to:

- Casey Fitzgerald (American football) (born 1985), American college football player
- Casey Fitzgerald (ice hockey) (born 1997), American ice hockey player
