= Scott Fitzgerald (disambiguation) =

F. Scott Fitzgerald (1896–1940) was an American author of novels and short stories.

Scott Fitzgerald may also refer to:

- Scott Fitzgerald (boxer) (born 1991), British boxer
- Scott Fitzgerald (footballer, born 1969), former Wimbledon defender, former manager of Brentford
- Scott Fitzgerald (footballer, born 1979), professional football player playing for Wealdstone F.C.
- Scott Fitzgerald (politician) (born 1963), member of the Wisconsin State Senate and the United States House of Representatives
- Scott Fitzgerald (singer) (born 1948), British singer
- Scott Fitzgerald (squash player) (born 1981), Welsh squash player
