= Les Fitzgerald =

Scottish footballer

Personal information
- Full name: Leslie Fitzgerald
- Date of birth: 27 March 1909
- Place of birth: Dennistoun, Scotland
- Position: Inside forward

Senior career*
Years	Team	Apps	(Gls)
1929–1934	Queen's Park	45	(8)
1934–1939	Ayr United	30	(5)

International career
1930	Scotland Amateurs	1	(0)
- * Club domestic league appearances and goals

Leslie Fitzgerald was a Scottish amateur football inside forward who played in the Scottish League for Queen's Park and Ayr United. He was capped by Scotland at amateur level.
