= George FitzGerald =

George FitzGerald or Fitzgerald may refer to:

- George FitzGerald (musician), English electronic musician
- George FitzGerald, 16th Earl of Kildare (1612–1660)
- George Fitzgerald (Family Affairs), a fictional character
- George Fitzgerald (politician) (1843–1917), merchant and politician in colonial Tasmania, Australia
- George Francis FitzGerald (1851–1901), Irish physicist
- George Robert FitzGerald (died 1786), Irish eccentric
- Sir George FitzGerald, 23rd Knight of Kerry (1917–2001), baronet, hereditary knight and British soldier
