= Martin Fitzgerald =

Martin Fitzgerald may refer to:

- Martin Fitzgerald (hurler) (born 1991), Irish hurler
- Martin Fitzgerald (politician) (1867–1927), Irish Senator
- Martin Fitzgerald (Passions), a fictional character on the daytime drama Passions
- Martin Fitzgerald (Without a Trace), a fictional character on the crime drama Without a Trace
