= James Fitzgerald (Australian cricketer) =

Australian cricketer

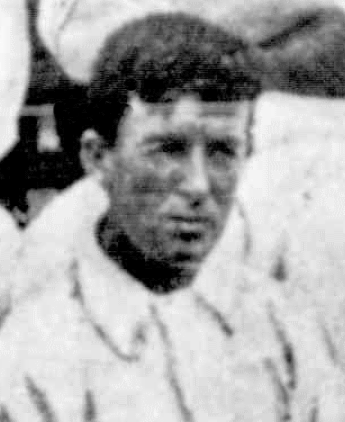

Personal information
- Born: 19 February 1874; Sydney, Australia
- Died: 20 August 1950 (aged 76); Graceville, Queensland, Australia
- Source: ESPNcricinfo, 9 May 2016

James Fitzgerald (19 February 1874 – 20 August 1950) was an Australian cricketer. He played eight first-class matches for Queensland between 1902 and 1905.

== See also ==
- List of Queensland first-class cricketers
