= Polyp (cartoonist) =

Polyp (formerly P. J. Polyp) is the pen name of the cartoonist Paul Fitzgerald, who is based in the UK. Much of his work, particularly his regular 'Big Bad World' feature for New Internationalist, is political.

== Career ==
A collection of his cartoons, Big Bad World, was published in 2002 by New Internationalist In 2009 he released Speechless: World History Without Words, a Graphic novel summarizing World history published by New Internationalist and Friends of the Earth. A German edition with extensively modified artwork, Sprachlos: Eine Weltgeschichte ohne Worte, was published in 2014.

In 2012 he was commissioned by The Co-operative Group to create a graphic novel history of the Rochdale Pioneers, The Co-operative Revolution. The book also outlined the extent of the modern day co-operative movement, and explored the presence of co-operation within evolved natural systems. It has since been published free online in a semi-animated format.

Working with Australian-born fine artist Eva Schlunke, he co-created the ecology themed children's book Little Worm's Big Question, which was published by New Internationalist on 7 January 2016.

As well as providing cartoons to many UK and international NGO campaign groups, he is a professional campaign prop builder, and an active member of the Skeptics in the Pub movement.

== Bibliography ==
- Polyp (2002). Big Bad World: Cartoon Molotovs in the Face of Corporate Rule.Big Bad World: Cartoon Molotovs in the Face of Corporate Rule. New Internationalist. ISBN 978-0-9540499-3-5.
- Polyp; L.I.M. Consortium (2004). . Ecra.
- Polyp (4 September 2009). Speechless: World History Without Words. New Internationalist.
- Polyp; Seán Michael Wilson; Benjamin Dickson (2013). Fight the Power!: A Visual History of Protest Amongst the English Speaking Peoples. New Internationalist Publications, Limited. ISBN 978-1-78026-122-5.
- Polyp; Robert Poole; Eva Schlunke (2019). Peterloo: Witnesses to a Massacre. New Internationalist Publications, Limited. ISBN 978-1-78026-475-2.
