= John Fitzgerald (priest) =

Irish Anglican priest

John Fitzgerald was an Anglican priest in the 17th century.

Fitzgerald was born in Cork and educated at Trinity College, Dublin. He was Archdeacon of Dublin from 1675 until his resignation in 1689.
