= Brian Fitzgerald =

Brian Fitzgerald may refer to:

- Brian Fitzgerald (academic), Australian academic and barrister
- Brian Fitzgerald (baseball) (born 1976), former U.S. Major league baseball relief pitcher
- Brian Fitzgerald (footballer) (1927–2013), Australian rules footballer
- Brian Fitzgerald (politician) (born 1947), Irish Labour Party and independent politician
