= John Patrick Fitzgerald =

John Patrick Fitzgerald (1815 – 8 January 1897) was a New Zealand medical doctor, community leader and hospital superintendent.

Fitzgerald was born in Carrickmacross, County Monaghan, Ireland in 1815. He studied medicine at the University of Glasgow graduating in 1839. He gained a Diploma in Obstetric Medicine from the British Lying-in Hospital in Dublin and belonged to the Royal College of Surgeons.

In 1840 Fitzgerald arrived in New Zealand on board the Oriental. In the next few years he took up several appointments: infirmary physician, coroner, Port Nicholson health officer, Wellington Militia surgeon and member of the first Wellington Province Medical Board in 1854. He was physician at Wellington's first hospital which opened in 1847 in Pipitea St, Thorndon. The hospital was open to Māori and Fitzgerald's hospital administration committee included Māori members.

Fitzgerald's medical practice included improved sanitation and ventilation of hospital and homes but his methods were subject to attack and derision from other medical professionals. By 1854 Fitzgerald was exhausted from his work, lack of leave, family illness and the death of his wife. He resigned and returned to Britain.

In 1856 Fitzgerald moved to South Africa where he was appointed medical officer at Grey Hospital (named after George Grey the Cape Colony governor) in King William’s Town (now Qonce). He practiced there for 30 years. Fitzgerald returned to Britain in 1888 and died in Ramsgate on 8 January 1897.
