= Senator Fitzgerald =

Senator Fitzgerald may refer to:

== Members of the United States Senate ==
- Peter Fitzgerald (politician) (born 1960), U.S. Senator from Illinois
- Thomas Fitzgerald (American politician, born 1796) (1796–1855), U.S. Senator from Michigan.

== United States state senate members ==
- James F. Fitzgerald (1895–1975), New York State Senate
- James Fitzgerald (American jurist, born 1851) (1851–1922), New York State Senate
- John C. Fitzgerald (1863–1928), New York State Senate
- John F. Fitzgerald (1863–1950), Massachusetts State Senate
- John I. Fitzgerald (1882–1966), Massachusetts State Senate
- John Warner Fitzgerald (1924–2006), Michigan State Senate
- Scott Fitzgerald (politician) (born 1963), Wisconsin State Senate
- Steve Fitzgerald (born 1944), Kansas State Senate
- Thomas Fitzgerald (Nebraska politician) (1920–2017), American politician from Nebraska
- W. T. A. Fitzgerald (1871–1948), Massachusetts State Senate
- William B. Fitzgerald Jr. (1942–2008), Michigan State Senate
- William J. Fitzgerald (1887–1947), Connecticut State Senate

== See also ==
- Joan Fitz-Gerald (born 1948), Colorado State Senate
