= Frank Fitzgerald (American football) =

American football player (1919–2014)

Personal information
- Born: August 15, 1919; New York City, U.S.
- Died: October 20, 2014 (aged 95); New Rochelle, New York, U.S.
- Listed height: 5 ft 10 in (1.78 m)
- Listed weight: 160 lb (73 kg)

Career history
- Boston Yanks (1946) Employee; Boston Yanks (1947) Publicity department; Boston Yanks (1948) General manager; New York Bulldogs / Yanks (1949–1951) General manager; Dallas Texans (1952) General manager / vice president

Frank Joseph Fitzgerald Sr. (August 15, 1919 – October 20, 2014) was an American professional football executive. He served as a general manager in the National Football League (NFL) for the team sequentially known as the Boston Yanks, the New York Bulldogs, the New York Yanks and the Dallas Texans from 1948 to 1952. He later worked in the radio business and for the NFL draft department of the Houston Oilers, now known as the Tennessee Titans.

== Early life ==
Several primary documents listed Fitzgerald's birth date as August 15, 1919, in New York City; however, media sources frequently gave birth dates in 1920 or 1921. In October 1940, he enlisted in World War II; at the time, he was listed as being unemployed. He served for the United States Army Air Corps. In January 1942, Fitzgerald married in New York City to Adelaide Collins, the daughter of Ted Collins, Kate Smith's talent manager.

== Executive career ==
Ted Collins became the owner of the Boston Yanks of the National Football League (NFL) in 1944, and in 1946, he hired Fitzgerald to the team. Fitzgerald was the team's "publicity man" by 1947. He moved to Boston, Massachusetts, in mid-1948, and that year became the team's general manager, taking over the duties of Arthur Sampson. He was just 28 years old when he took over the team's management. That year, the Yanks compiled a record of 3–9 and finished last in their division.

The franchise was moved to New York in 1949 and became the New York Bulldogs, with Fitzgerald remaining as general manager. They totaled a record of 1–10–1 in 1949 and were renamed the New York Yanks in 1950. The team went 7–5 for a third-place divisional finish in 1950, but then went 1–9–2 the following year and again finished last. Collins sold the team in 1952 and they became the Dallas Texans; new owner Giles E. Miller retained Fitzgerald as general manager and also gave him the role of vice president, being considered the unanimous choice based on recommendations by Collins and NFL commissioner Bert Bell. However, one month later, Fitzgerald resigned; a reporter for the Dallas Times-Herald noted that "he was presented with a Western hat, but it was apparent that the hat did not fit ... Frank was a big city man and wasn't any more sold on the Texans than the Texans were on him." Al Ennis succeeded him, with the Texans ultimately going 1–11 that year and folding, becoming the most recent NFL team to fold.

Fitzgerald left football in 1953. He later recalled his experiences as a football executive: "There was so much bidding over the players that the All-America Conference merged with the NFL in 1950. The Cleveland Browns, the old Baltimore Colts and the San Francisco 49ers went in. We combined some of the players and became the New York Yanks in 195[0]. I found myself making deals with men like Paul Brown and Art Rooney. Professional football was just beginning to gain ground." He also compared the modern NFL draft to the old days: "We had the first drafts In a room no bigger than a closet. Owners traded players on a handshake and their word was their contract. The first time Paul Brown of Cleveland asked one of the owners to sign a contract everyone was shocked and offended." He said that: "We never had a war room – just a bunch of notes, and we'd go to a hotel room and make trades over a table. It was much easier."

== Later life ==
After his NFL career, Fitzgerald received a job as a salesman for NBC Radio Network. He then produced syndicated radio shows until retiring in the 1980s. While in the NFL, he became friends with trainer Bobby Brown who later introduced him to Floyd Reese; Reese and Fitzgerald became friends. When Reese became an executive with the Houston Oilers (now known as the Tennessee Titans), he gave Fitzgerald a role in 1991 as the person who gave the team's NFL draft selections to league officials. He continued serving in this role with his son, Frank Jr., through at least 2010.

Fitzgerald died on October 20, 2014, at the age of 95. His son continued the practice of announcing the Titans' draft picks in 2015.
