= Francis Fitzgerald =

F. Scott Fitzgerald (1896–1940) was an American author.

Francis Fitzgerald or Francis FitzGerald may also refer to:

- Francis Fitzgerald (cricketer) (1864–1939), Australian cricketer and barrister
- Frank FitzGerald (judge), American football player and judge
- Francis Alan Fitzgerald (born 1949), musician
- Francis Alexander FitzGerald (1806–1897), Irish barrister and judge
- Francis Joseph Fitzgerald (1869–1911), commander of the Royal Northwest Mounted Police
- Francis Fitzgerald (fl. 1952), founder of WEAL

== See also ==
- Frank Fitzgerald (disambiguation)
- Frances FitzGerald (disambiguation)
