= Frances FitzGerald =

Frances FitzGerald may refer to:

- Frances FitzGerald (journalist) (born 1940), American journalist, wrote about Vietnam
- Frances Fitzgerald (politician) (born 1950), Irish politician
- Frances Scott Fitzgerald (1921–1986), daughter of Scott and Zelda Fitzgerald, journalist

== See also ==
- Francis Fitzgerald (disambiguation)
- Franky Fitzgerald, Francesca, Skins character
- Frankie Fitzgerald (born 1985), British actor
- Frank Fitzgerald (disambiguation)
