= Peter Fitzgerald-Moore =

British geologist

Peter Fitzgerald-Moore (28 May 1919 – 5 May 2004) was a British geologist, environmentalist and political activist.

== Education ==
He earned a Master's degree from Cambridge University. He was a member of the Faculty of General Studies at the University of Calgary until 1998 when he retired as an Adjunct Associate Professor.

He was a Senator of the University of Calgary for three years.

== Military history ==
In World War II, he served with the Royal Artillery. He received the Military Cross while serving in Italy as a Forward Observation Officer with the Eighth Indian Division.

== Career ==
He worked for the Royal Dutch Shell companies in various countries for 39 years, after the war. For part of that tenure he worked as Chief Geologist for Shell Canada Ltd.

After retirement, he contracted for the Geological Survey of Canada.

== Politics & Activism ==
He was elected mayor of Bowness, Alberta in 1958. He was a founding member of the Calgary Eco Centre. He (co?) founded the Western Affairs Committee. He was Director of the Pensador Institute.

The trilobite species Pseudodechenella petermoorei ormiston is named for him.
