= Joseph Fitzgerald =

Joseph Fitzgerald may refer to:

- Joseph Fitzgerald (ice hockey) (1904–1987), American ice hockey player
- Joseph D. FitzGerald (1899–1974), 3rd President of Fairfield University
- Joseph Dennis Fitzgerald (1936–2001), American freestyle wrestler and football player and coach
- Joseph John Fitzgerald (1887–1973), Australian politician
- Joe Fitzgerald (American football) (1899–1978), NFL player
- Joe Fitzgerald (baseball) (1897–1967), American baseball player
- Joe Fitzgerald (coin designer), American coin designer
- Joe Fitzgerald (handballer) (born 1971), American handball player
- Joe Fitzgerald (politician) (1912–1985), Australian politician
