= Paul Fitzgerald (Gaelic footballer) =

Irish Gaelic football player

Personal information
- Born: Fethard, County Tipperary
- Height: 6 ft 4 in (193 cm)

Sport
- Sport: Gaelic football
- Position: Goalkeeper
Club
- Years: Club
- Fethard
Club titles
	Football	Hurling
Tipperary titles	2	
Inter-county
- Years: County
- 2003-2014: Tipperary
Inter-county titles
- Munster titles: 1
- NFL: 1

Paul Fitzgerald is an Irish Gaelic football player who played at inter-county level for Tipperary, and plays his club football for Fethard in south County Tipperary.

== Honours ==
=== Fethard ===
Tipperary Senior Football Championship:

  - Winner (2): 1997, 2001

=== Tipperary ===
- McGrath Cup:
  - Winner (1): 2003
- Tommy Murphy Cup:
  - Winner (1): 2005
- National Football League Division 3, title:
  - Winner (1): 2009
- Munster Minor Football Championship:
  - Winner (1): 1995
- South Tipperary Footballer of the Year:
  - Winner (1): 2008
