= Stephen Fitzgerald =

Stephen Fitzgerald may refer to:

- Stephen FitzGerald (diplomat) (born 1938), Australian diplomat
- Stephen Fitzgerald (rugby union) (born 1995), Irish rugby union player

== See also ==
- Stephen R. Fitzgarrald (1854–1926), American politician
