= Fitzgeralds Casino and Hotel =

Fitzgeralds may refer to:

- Fitzgeralds Black Hawk in Black Hawk, Colorado
- Fitzgeralds Las Vegas, now The D Las Vegas in Las Vegas, Nevada
- Fitzgeralds Reno, now Whitney Peak Hotel, a non gaming hotel in Reno, Nevada
- Fitzgeralds Tunica in Tunica, Mississippi

== See also ==
- FitzGerald (disambiguation)
