= Fitzgerald, Alberta (disambiguation) =

Fitzgerald, Alberta may refer to:

- Fitzgerald, Alberta, a locality in the Regional Municipality of Wood Buffalo, Alberta
- Fitzgerald, Cypress County, Alberta, a locality in Cypress County, Alberta
- Fitzgerald, Thebathi 196, Alberta, a locality in Thebathi 196, Alberta
