= Thomas Fitzgerald =

Thomas, Tom, or Tommy Fitzgerald or FitzGerald may refer to:

== Arts and entertainment ==
- Thom Fitzgerald (born 1968), American-Canadian film director
- Tom Fitzgerald (reporter), American television newscaster
- Thomas Fitzgerald (composer), Australian composer, musical director, conductor and musician

== Law and politics ==
- Thomas FitzGerald of Laccagh (c. 1458–1487), Irish lawyer, statesman and soldier, Lord Chancellor of Ireland
- Thomas FitzGerald (County Louth politician) (died 1834), Irish politician and slave trader
- Thomas Fitzgerald (American politician, born 1796) (1796–1855), American judge and politician in Indiana and Michigan
- Tom Fitzgerald (Irish politician) (1939–2013), Irish Fianna Fáil politician
- Thomas Fitzgerald (Nebraska politician) (1920–2017), American politician from Nebraska
- Thomas Henry Fitzgerald (1824–1888), Irish farmer and politician in New Zealand and Australia
- Thomas R. Fitzgerald (judge) (1941–2015), American Chief Justice of the Illinois Supreme Court
- Thomas W. Fitzgerald (1854–1908), American lawyer and judge

== Nobility ==
- Thomas FitzMaurice FitzGerald (1175–1213)
- Thomas FitzGerald, 2nd Baron Desmond (c. 1260–1298), Lord Justice of Ireland
- Thomas FitzGerald, 3rd Baron Desmond (1290–1307)
- Thomas FitzGerald, 2nd Earl of Kildare (died 1328), Lord Justice of Ireland
- Thomas FitzGerald, 5th Earl of Desmond (c. 1386–1420), subject of a poem by Thomas Moore
- Thomas FitzGerald, 7th Earl of Desmond (died 1467/68), Lord Deputy of Ireland
- Thomas FitzGerald, 7th Earl of Kildare (c. 1421–1477), Lord Chancellor of Ireland
- Thomas FitzGerald, 11th Earl of Desmond (1454–1534)
- Thomas FitzGerald, 10th Earl of Kildare (1513–1537), also known as Silken Thomas
- Thomas FitzGerald, Earl of Offaly (1974–1997), only son of Maurice FitzGerald, 9th Duke of Leinster

== Sports ==
- Tom Fitzgerald (soccer) (1951–2004), American soccer coach
- Tom Fitzgerald (handballer) (born 1966), American handball player
- Tom Fitzgerald (ice hockey) (born 1968), American ice hockey player and executive
- Tommy Fitzgerald (footballer) (born 1970), Irish soccer player
- Tommy Fitzgerald (hurler) (born 1983), Irish hurling manager and hurler

== Others ==
- Thomas FitzGerald of Turlough (1661–1747), Irish landowner
- Thomas Naghten Fitzgerald (1838–1908), Irish-born surgeon, active in Australia
- Tom Fitzgerald (journalist) (1912–1983), American newspaper journalist for The Boston Globe
- Tom Fitzgerald (economist) (1918–1993), Australian economist
- Thomas R. Fitzgerald (Jesuit) (1922–2004), American priest, president of Fairfield University
