= Karen Fitzgerald =

American artist

- Education: University of Wisconsin at Milwaukee (B.F.A.); Hunter College (M.F.A.); Columbia University (M.E.)
- Occupation: Visual artist
- Website: www.fitzgeraldart.com

Karen Fitzgerald is an American artist based in New York City best known for working exclusively in the tondo form.

== Career ==
Fitzgerald's work has been exhibited throughout the United States including the University of Arizona, Queens Museum of Art, the Rahr-West Museum, Islip Art Museum, Madison Art Museum, Milwaukee Institute of Art Design, Milwaukee Art Museum, Fort Wayne Museum of Art, and the United Nations. Her work is also in the Reinhart Collection of Germany, the Spencer Collection of the New York Public Library, the Museum of New Art in Detroit, and the Brooklyn Union Gas collection along with other public and private collections including the Golda Meir Library at the University of Wisconsin in Milwaukee and at the Princeton University Library in Princeton, New Jersey. In 2021, her work “The Four Elemental Forces” was part of an exhibit by the Long Island City Arts Connection initiative.

In 1995, New York Times critic Pepe Karmel stated "looks back to an earlier epoch when art was not expected to carry the burden of social commentary" about her work. In 2005, Times critic Helen Harrison called Fitzgerald's work "atmospheric, dispensing with all but the most minimal references to tangible reality." In 2020, she was featured in Monk magazine.

Fitzgerald is a master teaching artist and provides arts-in-education consulting services for the education community. The Greenwall Foundation, Queens Community Arts Fund, Women’s Studio Center, and the New York Foundation for the Arts have all supported her with individual artist’s grants.

== Background ==
After growing up on a dairy farm in Wisconsin, Fitzgerald earned a BFA from the University of Wisconsin at Milwaukee, an MFA from Hunter College, and a Masters of Education from Teachers College, Columbia University.

Fitzgerald resides in Queens, New York.

== Selected exhibitions ==
- 2021 - "What the Light Saw", Plaxall Gallery, LIC, NYC
- 2019 - “360° Cosmic Landscape Revelations,” Reeves-Reed Arboretum Gallery, Summit, NJ
- 2018 - “Karen Fitzgerald,” The Vocal Workout Singing School, NYC
- 2016 - “Shimmering World,” ARTWorks Gallery on the Green, Norwalk, CT
- 2015 - “For Grace,” Hudson Hospital and Clinic, curated by Chelsea Kelly, Hudson, Wisconsin
- 2014 - “Immeasurable Light,” Open Center Gallery, curated by Lola Sheppard, NYC
- 2013-'14 - “Crossings,” Narthex Gallery, Saint Peter’s Church, NYC
- 2013 - "Friendly Gestures, Namaste", Queens College Art Center
- 2012 - "The Shift", Knox Gallery, NYC
- 2009 - "Earth, Light and Fire", Discovery Museum, Bridgeport, CT
- 2006 - "Tondi", Wooster Art Space
- 2004 - “Karen Fitzgerald,” Omega Institute, Reception Gallery, Rhinebeck, NY
- 2001 - "Orbs", Show Walls, Durst Organization Sponsor
- 1999 - "Into Light", Milwaukee Institute of Art and Design, WI
- 1997 - "Into Light", Rotunda Gallery, University of Arizona
- 1995 - "Live/Work in Queens", The Queens Museum of Art
- 1994 - "Journey," Jamaica Arts Center

== Selected awards and grants ==
- New York City Artist Corps grant, New York Foundation For the Arts (2021)
- New work grant by Queens Council on the Arts Fund (2020)
- Fellowship/Artist-in-Residence at the Haslla Art World, South Korea (2014)
- USA Projects, “From the Core” fundraiser (2013)
- Individual Artist’s Initiative by the Queens Council on the Arts (2007)
- Edwin Abbey Mural Workshop Fellowship from the National Academy Museum and School (2006)
- Individual Artist’s Award by the Queens Council on the Arts (1998, 2000)
- Artsline Award from AT&T (1998)
- “21 for 25” Artist’s Award from the Women’s Studio Workshop (1999)
- Purchase Award from the Edna Carlston Gallery: Sentry Insurance (1978)

== Selected bibliography ==
- 2022- Korea USA Czech International Exchange Exhibition, catalogue, published in South Korea by Jeju National University.
- 2022- In Praise of Form, catalogue, essay by Taney Roniger, in conjunction with exhibition at Piano Craft Gallery, Boston, MA
- 2021- Interalia, magazine (online), interview feature with Richard Bright, July 2021 issue
- 2020- MONK Gallery, magazine, essay and artwork feature, "Full Moon Gilder", pp. 42–52.
- 2020- Porter House Review, April 10, 2020, artwork feature
- 2018- CMYK, catalog, essay written by Damien Anger
- 2011- Stone Voices, “The Stillness of Painting,” by Karen Fitzgerald, p. 100; portfolio feature, pp. 57–64.
- 2008- Conscious Design, “Radically Round,” by Karen Fitzgerald
- 2006- The New York Times, “With a Little Artistic License,” by Helen Harrison, Section 14, p. 8.
- 2005- The New York Times, “Hunting in the Wilds of Imagination,” by Helen Harrison, Section 14, p. 10.
- 2001- National Public Radio, “Karen Fitzgerald and Susan Schear,” Arts & Culture in the Marketplace with Beatrice Black.
- 1999- The Wausau Daily Herald, “Metaphorical landscapes,” by Joy Marquardt.
- 1995- The New York Times, “Depicting the Multiculturalism of Queens,” by Pepe Karmel, p. C23.
- 1995- The Queens Tribune, 1995, “Museum Highlights Artists Who Live and Work in Queens,” Annette Deinzer, p. 21.
- 1995- Live / Work in Queens, catalogue, Queens Museum of Art, by Christina Yang, curator: “Karen Fitzgerald,” pp. 14–15.
- 1994- New York Newsday, “ Queens Profile, Karen Fitzgerald,” by Sheila McKenna, p. 32.
- 1987- Annual Juried Exhibition ’87, Catalogue, Queens Museum of Art, essay by Susanna Torruella-Leval.
- 1980- Milwaukee Sentinel, Wisconsin, “Karen Fitzgerald,” by Dean Jensen.
