= Lackendarra Jim =

Irish hermit

Jim Fitzgerald
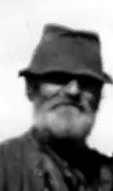
- Born: 1 February 1891; Castlereagh, Waterford, Ireland
- Died: 25 February 1959 (aged 68); Waterford, Ireland
- Burial place: Castlereagh, Waterford
- Military career
- Allegiance: United Kingdom
- Branch: British Army
- Service years: 1914–1918
- Rank: Private
- Unit: Connaught Rangers
- Conflicts: Mesopotamia; First World War

Jim Fitzgerald (1 February 1891 – 25 February 1959), also known by his nickname Lackendarra Jim, was a man who chose to live as a hermit in the Comeragh Mountains of County Waterford in Ireland. He chose the life on his return from World War 1 in 1919, reportedly due to shell shock. He was unable to fit in and keep a job, so he went to the mountains looking for a place to live away from society.

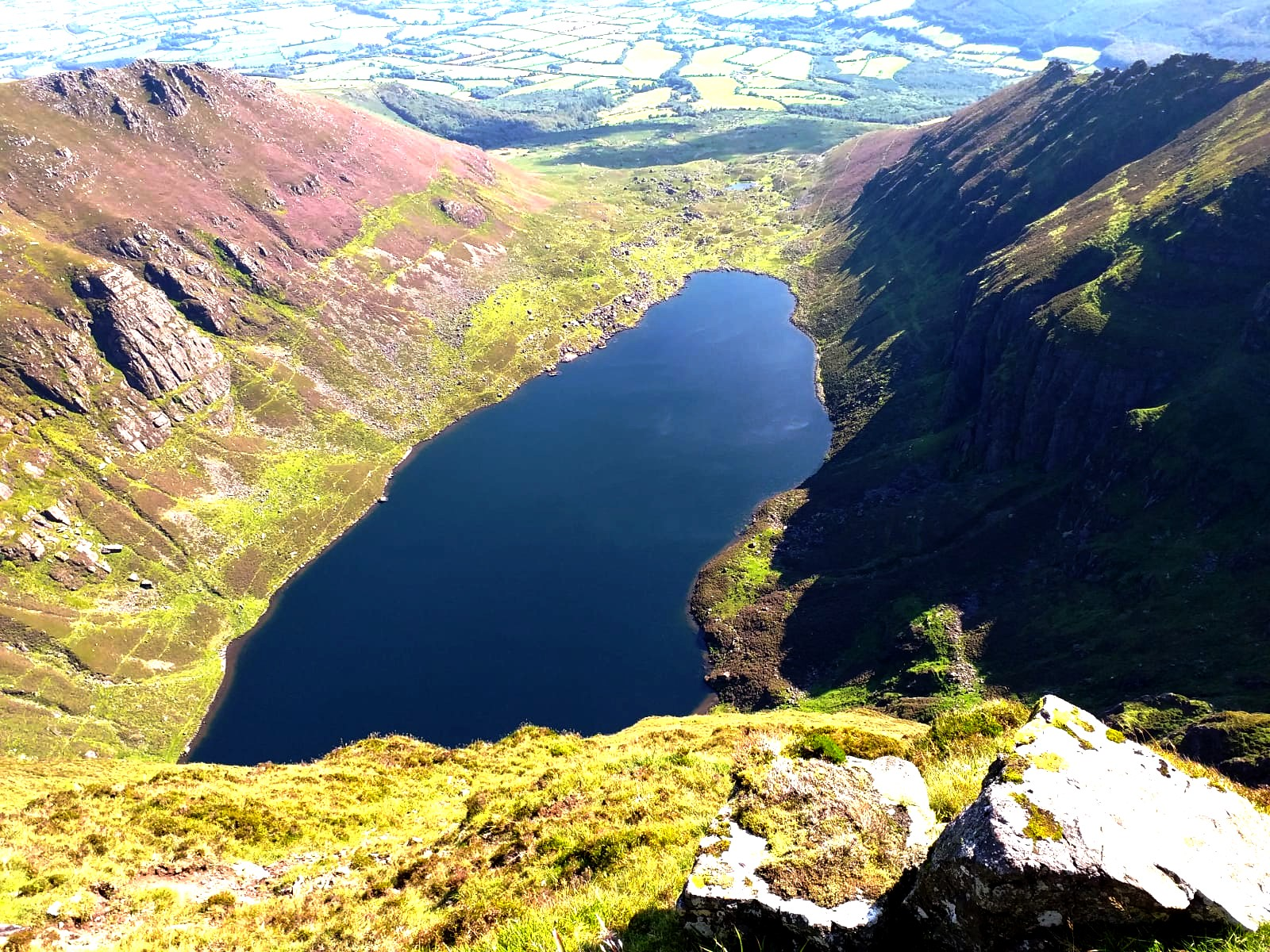
Counsingaun in the Comeragh Mountains

He was born on the other side of the mountain range in County Waterford but chose to set up his cave/home on land just beneath Coumsingaun, which is a spectacular example of a corrie (or cirque) lake, surrounded on three sides by towering, sheer cliffs in the Comeragh Mountains. His name Lackendarra comes from the townland close to where he was born. His proper name is recorded as Jim Fitzgerald.

According to the records he was born in 1891 and was raised by his grandparents in the townland of Castlereagh near Lackendarra, his parents had gone to work in the USA. He enlisted in the British Army at the outbreak of World War 1 with the Royal Irish Regiment in 1914 and was subsequently sent to Mesopotamia with the 1st Battalion of the Connaught Rangers in 1916. It is not known what happened next, but he survived the war and returned to Ireland in 1918. He was discharged with the diagnosis “melancholia” due to suffering a severe shell shock.

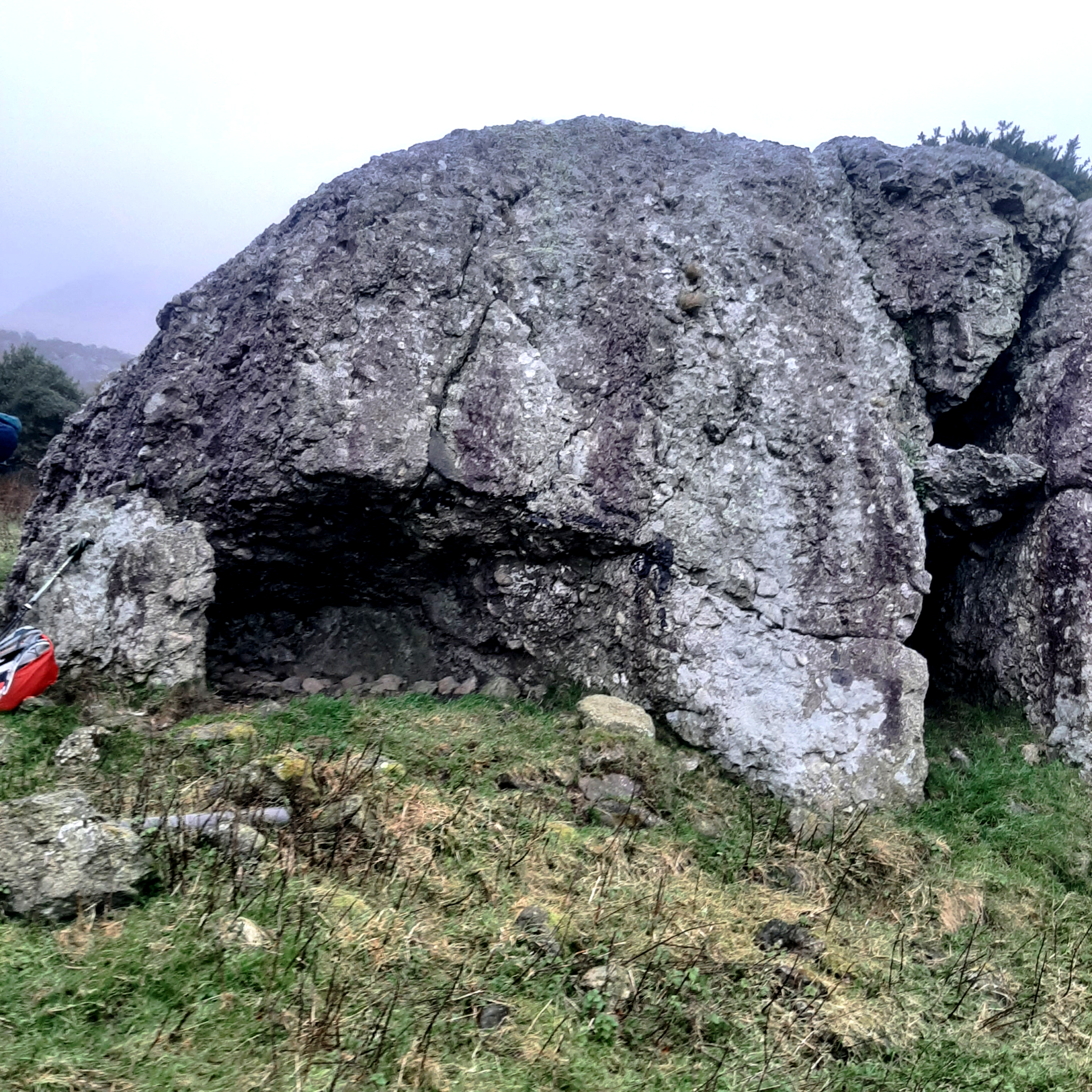
The cave of the hermit Lackendarra in the Comeragh Mountains

He was given an army pension, and he would walk about 8 km from Kilclooney, where he lived, to the village of Clonea Power every two weeks to collect it and buy essential supplies. Apparently, he would also visit the public house in the village before he went home and sometimes came home a day or two later.

His home consisted of a very small cave in a rock which he modified with stones and canvas to make it habitable. The cave itself is barely large enough to accommodate a single person in a prone position. It appears that he lived there for over 40 years until his death in 1959. According to his death certificate he died of heart failure due to hypertension. He died at Ardkeen Chest Hospital, Waterford.

Since his death, his name has become synonymous with the Comeragh Mountains with many recordings and even a play has been written about him.
