= John Moonan Fitzgerald =

American politician and jurist

John Moonan Fitzgerald (January 20, 1923 – June 16, 2008) was an American politician and jurist.

Born in Rochester, Minnesota, Fitzgerald served in the United States Army Air Forces as a pilot during World War II. He had gone to Rochester Community College and Michigan State University. Fitzgerald received his bachelor's degree and law degrees from the University of Minnesota and practiced law in New Prague, Minnesota. He was the New Prague city attorney from 1950 to 1955. Fitzgerald served in the Minnesota House of Representatives from 1957 to 1962 as a Democrat. He served as Minnesota state district judge from 1963 until his retirement in 1993.
