= John Fitzgerald (offensive guard) =

Former college American football player

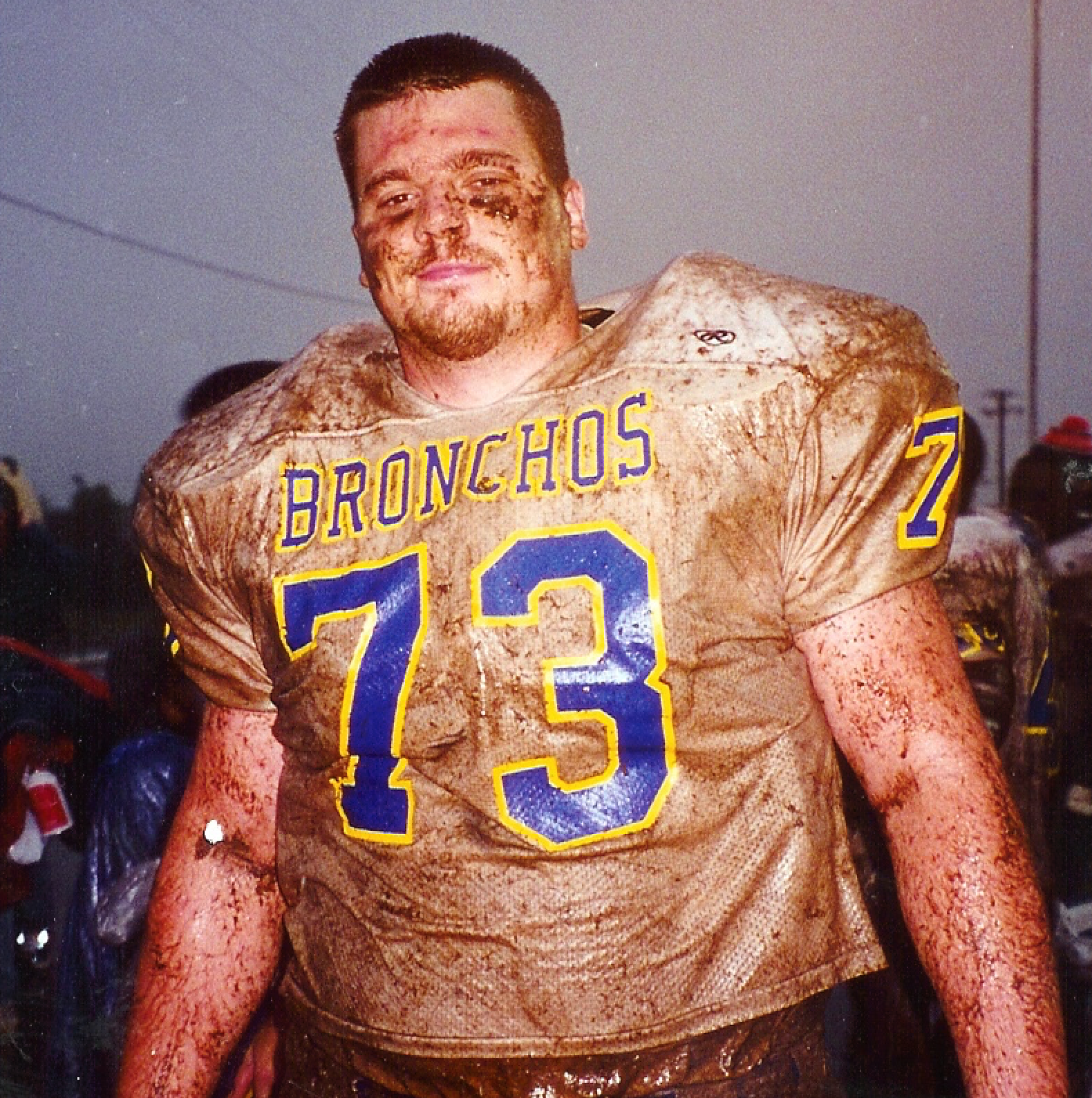
- Fitzgerald after a 1998 Central Oklahoma victory in a rain storm

No. 73
- Position: Offensive guard

Personal information
- Listed height: 6 ft 5 in (1.96 m)
- Listed weight: 300 lb (136 kg)

Career information
- High school: Putnam City North (OK)
- College: Central Oklahoma (1997–2000)

Awards and highlights
- 3× NCAA Division II All-American (1998, 1999, 2000)

John Fitzgerald is an American former college football player. He played offensive guard for the University of Central Oklahoma in Edmond, Oklahoma from 1997-2000. During his career, Fitzgerald was named an NCAA All-American following his sophomore, junior and senior seasons. He was also named Daktronics All-West Region all three seasons and All–Lone Star Conference each season. Fitzgerald was also the Lone Star Conference Offensive Lineman of The Year in 1998.

== College football ==
In 1999, The Daily Oklahoman honored Fitzgerald by naming him to the All-Century State College Football team, which honored the best small college players from 1900–1999. Fitzgerald was named to that team following his sophomore season.

In 2005, UCO honored Fitzgerald by naming him to the All-Century University of Central Oklahoma team. This was a team honoring the best football players in the 100 years of football played by the University of Central Oklahoma.

In 2006, the Lone Star Conference celebrated its 75th anniversary by selecting the 75 greatest football players in the history of the conference. Fitzgerald was one of six Bronchos named to this elite team. During Fitzgerald's career at UCO, the Bronchos won 35 games. During 1997, UCO finished with a record of 9–2 and won the Lone Star Conference North Division Championship. In 1998, they had the most success of that four-year span. The Bronchos finished the season 13–0 and ranked number one in the nation. They won the Lone Star Conference North Division Championship as well as the overall conference championship. They also won the NCAA West Regional Championship. In 1999, UCO started out 8-0, but finished the season with 3 straight losses. They still won their second straight overall conference championship. In 2000, UCO finished 5-5.

Fitzgerald was invited to the NFL Combine and trained with Chip Smith at Competitive Edge Sports in Atlanta, Georgia. While in Atlanta, Fitzgerald trained with NFL stars Rudi Johnson, Alge Crumpler, Champ Bailey and Brian Urlacher. He suffered a shoulder injury that prevented a career in the National Football League.

Fitzgerald was also a standout track and field athlete while at Central Oklahoma. Fitzgerald twice qualified for the NCAA Indoor & Outdoor National Championships in the shot put and discus throw. During his time at UCO, Fitzgerald had a personal best in the discus of 180 feet 4 inches and a best in the shot of 52 feet 10.75 inches.

Fitzgerald was on the 2015 College Football Hall of Fame Ballot.

== Currently ==
Fitzgerald is the color analyst for Central Oklahoma Bronchos football games, alongside Dave Garrett.
