= Cormac na Haoine MacCarthy Reagh =

Irish prince (died 1567)

Cormac na hAoine MacCarthy Reagh
- Prince of Carbery
- Tenure: 1531–1567
- Predecessor: Donal MacCarthy Reagh
- Died: 1567
- Spouse: Julia MacCarthy (Muskerry)
- Issue Detail: Donal & others
- Father: Donal MacCarthy Reagh
- Mother: Eleanor FitzGerald

Cormac na Haoine MacCarthy Reagh, 13th Prince of Carbery (c. 1490–1567) was an Irish chieftain who owned almost half a million acres in south west Ireland.

== Birth and origins ==
Cormac was born in Carbery about 1490, the eldest son of Donal MacCarthy Reagh and his second wife Eleanor FitzGerald. His father was the 12th Prince of Carbery. His father's family were the MacCarthy Reagh, a Gaelic Irish dynasty that branched from the MacCarthy-Mor line with Donal Gott MacCarthy, a medieval King of Desmond, whose sixth son Donal Maol MacCarthy Reagh was the first independent ruler of Carbery.

His mother was a daughter of Gerald FitzGerald, 8th Earl of Kildare. Her family, the Geraldines, were Old English.

Family tree

Cormac na Haoine MacCarthy Reagh with wife, parents, and other selected relatives. (Note: This family tree is based on genealogies of the MacCarthy Reagh dynasty.)

Dermod an Duna; 8th Prince; Carbery
Finghin; 10th Prince; Carbery d. 1505	Catherine; FitzGerald	Dermod; 11th Prince
Donal; 12th Prince c. 1455 – 1531	Eleanor; FitzGerald
Cormac na Haoine; 13th Prince; 1490–1567	Julia; MacCarthy; Muskerry	Finghin; 14th Prince	Donogh; 15th Prince d. 1576	Owen; 16th Prince; 1520–1594 of the Parliament
Donal; 17th Prince d. 1612 of the Pipes	Margaret; FitzGerald	Florence; MacCarthy; 1560–1640
Cormac; MacCarthy d.v.p.*	Eleanor; Fitzgibbon	David; 7th Viscount; Fermoy; 1573–1635	Owen; MacCarthy; Reagh
Donal; Kilbrittain d. 1636	Ellen; Roche	Charles; 1st Viscount; Muskerry d. 1641	Daniel; MacCarthy d. 1666
Charles; Kilbrittain	Eleanor; MacCarthy	Denis; MacCarthy d. 1712; Springhouse

Legend

XXX	Subject of the article	XXX	Princes of Carbery	XXX	Viscounts; Muskerry

*d.v.p. = predeceased his father (decessit vita patris)

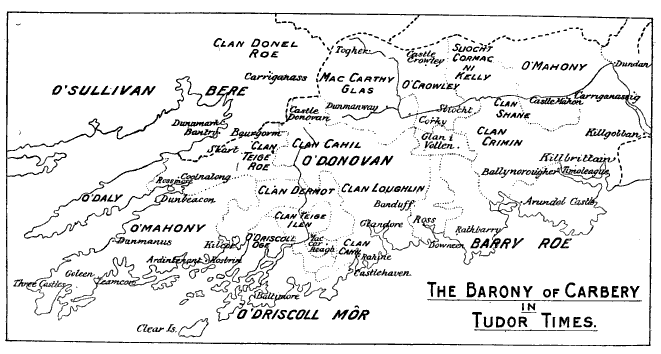
Carbery in Tudor times

== Battle of Mourne ==
The Battle of Mourne or of Mourne Abbey, also called of Cluhar and Moor, was fought in 1520 or 1521. It was part of an internecine strife of the Geraldines of Desmond in which Thomas FitzThomas FitzGerald defeated his nephew James FitzGerald, 10th Earl of Desmond, and succeeded him as the 11th Earl. Carbery was drawn into this as Thomas Fitzthomas was allied with MacCarthy's father-in-law, Cormac Oge Laidir MacCarthy. MacCarthy therefore led his father's troops against the 11th Earl of Desmond, who was defeated.

== Prince ==
MacCarty succeeded his father in 1530 as the 13th prince of Carbery.

== Marriage and children ==
MacCarthy married Julia, daughter of Cormac Oge Laidir MacCarthy, 10th Lord of Muskerry. It was his first but her second marriage. She was the widow of Gerald Fitzmaurice, 15th Baron Kerry, who had died in 1550.

Cormac and Julia had two sons:

1. Donal na Pipi, became the 17th Prince
2. Dermond na-Glac MacCarthy

—and four daughters:

1. Catherine, married John Butler of Kilcash, father of Walter Butler, 11th Earl of Ormond
2. Honoria, married her distant cousin Owen MacDonogh MacCarthy, Prince of Duhallow
3. Ellinor, married her cousin Dermod MacCarthy of Enniskean
4. Ellen, married first in 1572 Sir James FitzGerald, Lord of Decies (died 1581), and secondly James FitzRichard de Barry, Lord Ibane and 4th Viscount Buttevant, ancestor of the Earls of Barrymore. Ellen seems to have been an illegitimate child.

After MacCarthy's death his wife would marry thirdly Edmund Butler, 1st/11th Baron Dunboyne (died 1566)

== Death ==
Carbery, as he now was, died in 1567. He was succeeded according to Brehon law and tanistry by his brother Finghin as the 14th prince.

== Ancestry ==
Ancestors of Cormac na Haoine MacCarthy Reagh

16. Donal Reagh MacCarthy
8. Dermod an Duna MacCarthy Reagh
17. Joanna FitzMaurice
4. Finghin MacCarthy Reagh
18. Teige MacCarthy, Lord of Muscry
9. Ellen MacCarthy
2. Donal MacCarthy Reagh
20. James FitzGerald, 6th Earl of Desmond
10. Thomas FitzGerald, 7th Earl of Desmond
21. Mary de Burgh
5. Catherine FitzGerald
22. William de Barry, 8th Baron Barry
11. Ellice de Barry
23. Ellen de la Roche
1. Cormac na Haoine
24. John FitzGerald, 6th Earl of Kildare
12. Thomas FitzGerald, 7th Earl of Kildare
25. Rose Basset
6. Gerald FitzGerald, 8th Earl of Kildare
26. James FitzGerald, 6th Earl of Desmond
13. Jane FitzGerald
27. Mary de Burgh
3. Eleanor FitzGerald
28. Sir Edward FitzEustace
14. Rowland FitzEustace, 1st Baron Portlester
7. Alison FitzEustace

== Notes and references ==
=== Sources ===
- Barry, E. (1902). Barrymore: Records of the Barrys of County Cork. Cork: Guy and Co.
- Burke, Bernard (1883). A Genealogical History of the Dormant, Abeyant, Forfeited and Extinct Peerages of the British Empire (New ed.). London: Harrison. OCLC 499232768.
- Burke, Bernard; Burke, Ashworth Peter (1915). A Genealogical and Heraldic History of the Peerage and Baronetage, the Privy Council, Knightage and Companionage (77th ed.). London: Harrison. OCLC 1155471554.
- Cokayne, George Edward (1916). Gibbs, Vicary (ed.). The complete peerage of England, Scotland, Ireland, Great Britain and the United Kingdom, extant, extinct, or dormant. Vol. IV (2nd ed.). London: St Catherine Press. OCLC 228661424. – Dacre to Dysart (for Dunboyne)
- Gibson, Charles Bernard (1861). The History of the County and City of Cork. Vol. I. London: Thomas C. Newby. OCLC 1046580159. – to 1603
- Lainé, P. Louis (1836). "Mac-Carthy". Archives généalogiques et historiques de la noblesse de France [Genealogical and Historical Archives of the Nobility of France] (in French). Vol. Tome cinquième. Paris: Imprimerie de Bethune et Plon. pp. 1–102. OCLC 865941166.
- Lodge, John (1789). Archdall, Mervyn (ed.). The Peerage of Ireland or, A Genealogical History of the Present Nobility of that Kingdom. Vol. II. Dublin: James Moore. OCLC 264906028. – Earls
- O'Hart, John (1892). Irish Pedigrees: Or, the Origin and Stem of the Irish Nation. Vol. I (5th ed.). Dublin: James Duffy & Co. OCLC 7239210. – Irish stem

Regnal titles
Preceded by Donal MacCarthy Reagh	Prince of Carbery; 1531–1567	Succeeded by Donogh MacCarthy Reagh
