= Donal of the Pipes, 17th Prince of Carbery =

Irish prince (died 1612)

Donal MacCarthy Reagh
- Prince of Carbery
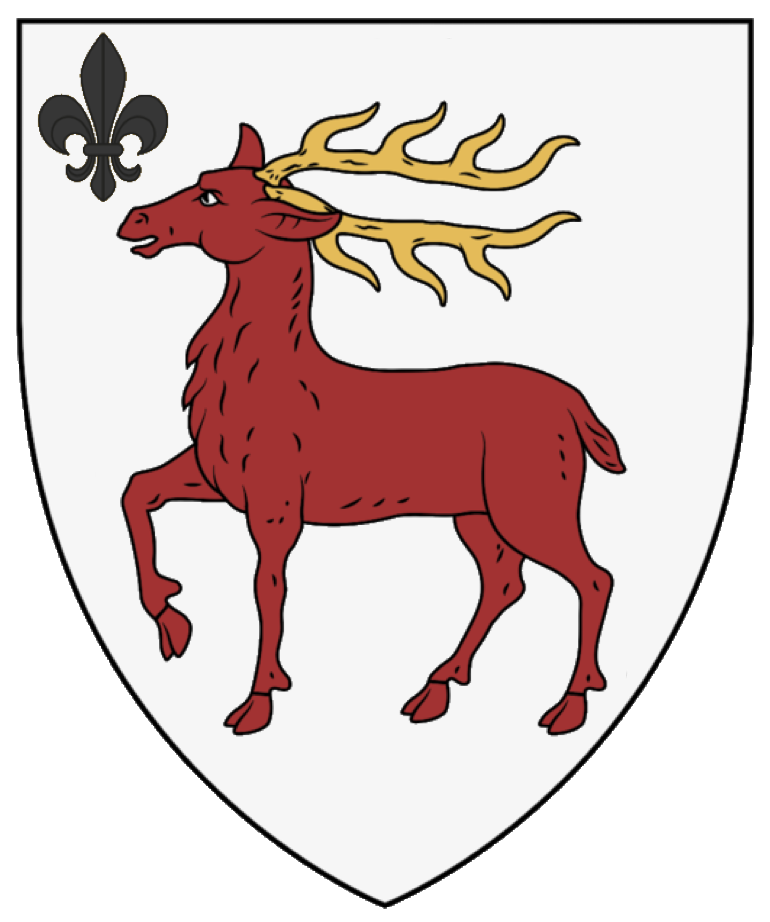
- Coat of arms
- Tenure: 1594–1606
- Predecessor: Owen MacCarthy Reagh
- Died: 1612
- Spouse: Margaret FitzGerald
- Issue Detail: Cormac & others
- Father: Cormac na Haoine MacCarthy Reagh
- Mother: Julia MacCarthy (Muskerry)

Donal na Pipi MacCarthy Reagh (Irish: Domhnall na bpíopaí Mac Cárthaigh Riabhach) (died 10 October 1612) was the 17th Prince of Carbery from 1593 to 1606, when he surrendered the principality to the English Crown under the policy of surrender and regrant.

He belonged to the MacCarthy Reagh dynasty as a son of Cormac na Haoine, the 13th Prince of Carbery. His epithet "of the Pipes" (na bpíopaí in Irish) originates from when several pipes of wine washed up on the beach at Burren, which was traditionally believed to be a sign of good fortune for him.

== Birth and origins ==
Donal was born the eldest son of Cormac MacCarthy Reagh and his wife Julia MacCarthy. His father was the 13th Prince of Carbery. His father's family were the MacCarthy Reagh, a Gaelic Irish dynasty that branched from the MacCarthy-Mor line with Donal Gott MacCarthy, a medieval King of Desmond, whose sixth son Donal Maol MacCarthy Reagh was the first independent ruler of Carbery.

His mother was a daughter of Cormac Oge Laidir MacCarthy, 10th Lord of Muskerry. She had married his father after the death of her first husband, Gerald Fitzmaurice, 15th Baron Kerry. Her father's family were the MacCarthys of Muskerry, another cadet branch of the MacCarthy Mor.

Family tree

Donal MacCarthy Reagh with wife, parents, and other selected relatives. (Note: This family tree is based on a tree showing the MacCarthy Reagh lords of Carbery and genealogies of the MacCarthy Reagh dynasty.)

Donal; 12th Prince c. 1455 – 1531	Eleanor; FitzGerald
Cormac na Haoine; 13th Prince; 1490–1567	Julia; MacCarthy; Muskerry	Finghin; 14th Prince	Donogh; 15th Prince d. 1576	Owen; 16th Prince; 1520–1594 of the Parliament
Donal; 17th Prince d. 1612 of the pipes	Margaret; FitzGerald	Florence; MacCarthy; 1560–1640
Cormac; MacCarthy d.v.p.*	Eleanor; Fitzgibbon	David; 7th Viscount; Fermoy; 1573–1635	Owen; MacCarthy; Reagh
Donal; Kilbrittain d. 1636	Ellen; Roche	Charles; 1st Viscount; Muskerry d. 1641	Daniel; MacCarthy d. 1666
Charles; Kilbrittain	Eleanor; MacCarthy	Denis; MacCarthy d. 1712; Springhouse

Legend

XXX	Subject of the article	XXX	Princes of Carbery	XXX	Viscounts; Muskerry	XXX	Viscounts; Fermoy

*d.v.p. = predeceased his father (decessit vita patris)

== Marriage and children ==
Donal married Margaret, daughter of Sir Thomas Ruadh FitzGerald and Ellice Power. She was a granddaughter of James FitzGerald, 13th Earl of Desmond. Ellice Power was a daughter of Sir Richard Poer, 1st Baron le Power and Coroghmore, and Catherine Butler, daughter of Piers Butler, 8th Earl of Ormond.

Donal and Margaret had six sons: (Note: Lainé and John O'Hart agree that Donal and Margaret had six sons and two daughters, but they disagrre on the birth order except that Cormac was the eldest son and Julia the elder daughter. The order given below follows Lainé.)

1. Cormac, who predeceased his father but had a son Donal who married Ellen Roche, daughter of David Roche, 7th Viscount Fermoy
2. Florence of Banduff, whose grandson was Lt. Col. Finghin of Benduff, the last Chief of the Name MacCarthy Reagh.
3. Donogh of Kilbrittain, died without issue
4. Owen, from whom descended the Springhouse branch, which would produce the French Counts MacCarthy Reagh
5. Taig, died without issue
6. Donal, died without issue

—and two daughters:

1. Julia, married Edmond, Lord Barry as his 2nd wife
2. Ellen, married Taig MacCarthy of Ballykay

== 17th Prince ==
According to English custom he would have succeeded his father as Prince of Carbery at his death in 1567, but brehon law was applied and all his three paternal uncles ruled before him. He succeeded as the 17th Prince of Carbery at the death of his uncle Owen in about 1593.

== Surrender and regrant ==
Although he surrendered Carbery to the Crown in 1606, he does not appear to have been granted a peerage in return as would typically have been the case. However, as seen in the 1607 pedigree, he is listed being "Lord of Carbery" and as such the family was able to retain a vast yearly income. Donal na Pipi's son, Cormac, predeceased him leaving an only son, Donal of Kilbrittain, who died in 1636. Upon his death an inquisition was taken of the family and it was determined that the MacCarthy Reagh was still collecting yearly rents from various Irish chiefs that all totaled £207 16s 11¼d per annum. This sum doesn't include any revenue from his 70½ demesne ploughlands, and is approximately equivalent to £1,056,000 in 2018.

== Conflict with Florence ==
Donal na Pipi is widely known due to his conflict with his cousin, Florence, over the succession to the chiefship as Prince of Carbery. Donal notoriously broke a promise to Florence when he violated his bond with Florence for £10,000 and surrendered the territory and lordship of Carbery to King James I in 1606. Although it can only be speculated, it seems Donal may have realized that English conquest was by now a sure thing, and the best way (despite his personal ambitions) to preserve Carbery was to opt for surrender and regrant. The family's native Irish allegiance can hardly be called into question, as just fours years earlier, although Donal na Pipi remained visibly neutral, his cousin fought alongside The O'Sullivan Beare against the English at the Battle of Kinsale.

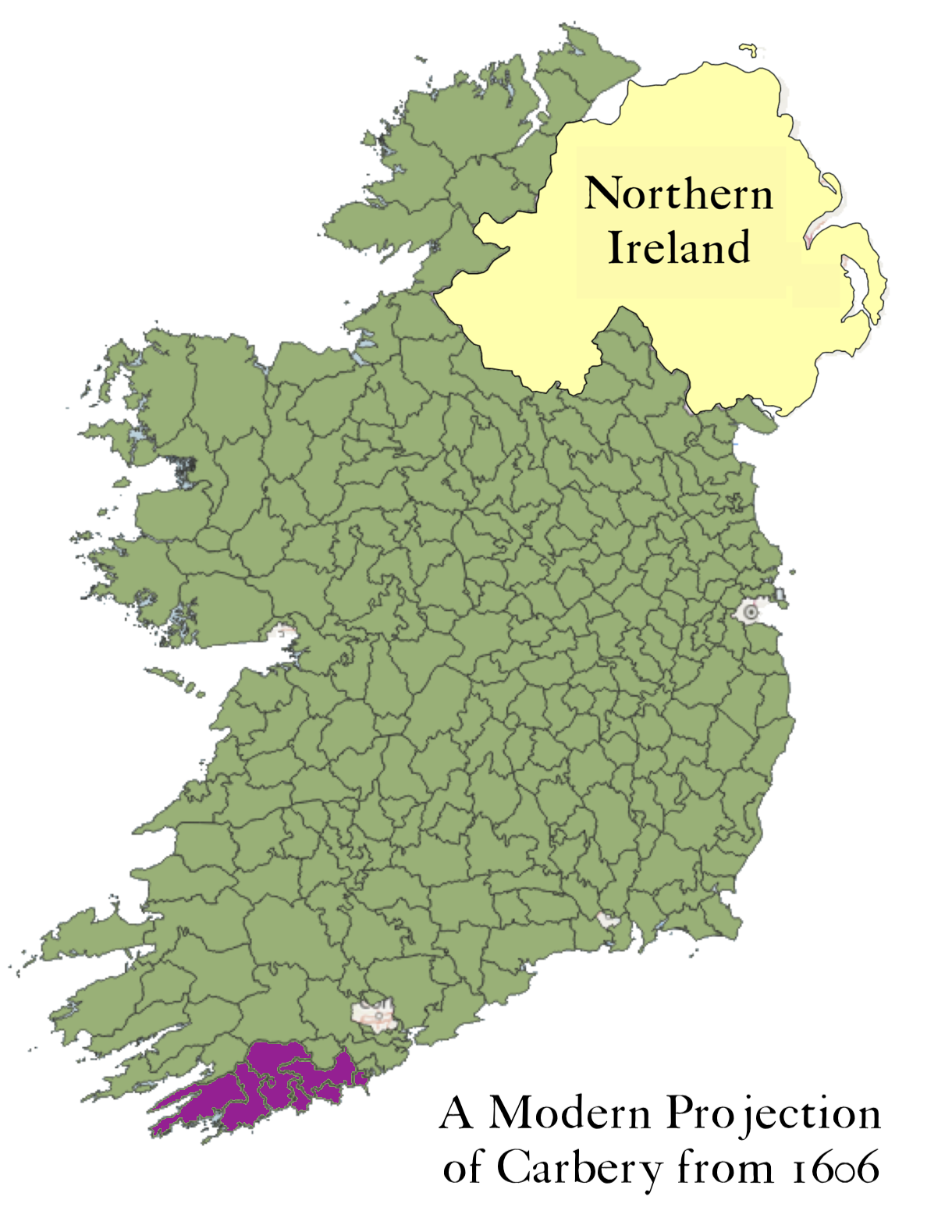
A projection of the Principality of Carbery, circa 1606, upon a modern map of Ireland's baronies. This map would have been the extent of the territory surrendered by Donal na Pipi.

== Carbery ==
By comparing William F.T. Butler's map, 'The Barony of Carbery in Tudor Times,' with modern land surveys, we can estimate that at the time Donal surrendered Carbery, it comprised the modern baronies of West Carbery (East and West Divisions), East Carbery (East and West Divisions), Kinalmeaky, and Ibane and Barryroe. Which would equate to 436,478.1 acres (682 square miles) in size, or just over 2% of Ireland's total size. In medieval Ireland (prior to its incorporation as a petty kingdom) it was the largest barony, and that superlative would remain true today. In fact, if it were reestablished today as its own kingdom it would rank a respectable 180th out of the world's recognized 225 countries and dependencies by land area.

== Ancestry ==
Ancestors of Donal of the Pipes, 17th Prince of Carbery

8. Finghin MacCarthy Reagh, 10th Prince of Carbery
4. Donal MacCarthy Reagh, 12th Prince of Carbery
18. Thomas FitzGerald, 7th Earl of Desmond
9. Catherine FitzGerald
19. Ellice de Barry
2. Cormac na Haoine MacCarthy Reagh, 13th Prince of Carbery
10. Gerald FitzGerald, 8th Earl of Kildare
5. Eleanor FitzGerald
11. Alison FitzEustace
1. Donal na Pipi, 17th Prince of Carbery
Cormac Laidir MacCarthy, 4th Lord of Muskerry
6. Cormac Oge MacCarthy, 5th Lord of Muskerry
Mary FitzMaurice
3. Julia MacCarthy of Muskerry
7. Catherine Barry

== Notes and references ==
=== Sources ===
- Dunlop, Robert (1893). "MacCarthy Reagh, Florence". In Lee, Sidney (ed.). Dictionary of National Biography. Vol. XXXIV. London: Smith, Elder, & Co. pp. 441–443. OCLC 8544105.
- Gibson, Charles Bernard (1861). The History of the County and City of Cork. Vol. I. London: Thomas C. Newby. OCLC 1046580159. – to 1603
- Lainé, P. Louis (1836). "Mac-Carthy". Archives généalogiques et historiques de la noblesse de France [Genealogical and Historical Archives of the Nobility of France] (in French). Vol. Tome cinquième. Paris: Imprimerie de Bethune et Plon. pp. 1–102. OCLC 865941166.
- McCarthy, Samuel Trant (1922). The MacCarthys of Munster. Dundalk: The Dundalgan Press. OCLC 1157128759.
- Moody, Theodore William; Martin, F. X.; Byrne, Francis John, eds. (1984). A New History of Ireland. Vol. IX:Maps, Genealogies, Lists. Oxford: Oxford University Press. ISBN 0-19-821745-5.
- O'Hart, John (1892). Irish Pedigrees: Or, the Origin and Stem of the Irish Nation. Vol. I (5th ed.). Dublin: James Duffy & Co. OCLC 7239210. – Irish stem
