= Donal MacCarthy Reagh of Kilbrittain =

17th-century Irish magnate

- Predecessor: Donal of the Pipes, 17th Prince of Carbery
- Successor: Charles MacCarthy Reagh of Kilbrittain
- Died: 1636
- Spouse: Ellen Roche
- Issue Detail: Charles MacCarthy Reagh of Kilbrittain & others
- Father: Cormac MacCarthy Reagh of Kilbrittain
- Mother: Eleanor Fitzgibbon

Donal MacCarthy Reagh of Kilbrittain (died 1636) was an Irish magnate who owned the extensive lands of Carbery (almost half a million acres) in south-western County Cork.

== Birth and origins ==
Donal was born the son of Cormac MacCarthy Reagh and Eleanor Fitzgibbon. His father was the son and heir of Donal of the Pipes, 17th Prince of Carbery, but predeceased him. Donal, the subject of this article, therefore inherited the lands of Carbery from his grandfather. His father's family were the MacCarthy Reagh, a Gaelic Irish dynasty that branched from the MacCarthy-Mor line with Donal Maol MacCarthy Reagh, the first independent ruler of Carbery. This Donal was the 6th son of Donal Gott MacCarthy, a medieval King of Desmond.

His mother was a daughter of Edmund Fitzgibbon, 11th White Knight, and widow of Florence MacCarthy of Iniskean. His mother's family, the Fitzgibbons, were Old English and descended from Maurice Fitzgibbon knighted in 1333 by Edward III.

Family tree

Donal MacCarthy Reagh with wife, parents, and other selected relatives. (Note: This family tree is based on genealogies of the MacCarthy Reagh dynasty.)

Donal; 17th Carbery d. 1612 of the pipes	Margaret; FitzGerald
Cormac; MacCarthy d.v.p.*	Eleanor; Fitzgibbon	David; 7th Viscount; Fermoy; 1573–1635	Owen; MacCarthy
Donal; Kilbrittain d. 1636	Ellen; Roche	Charles; 1st Viscount; Muskerry d. 1641	Daniel; MacCarthy d. 1666
Charles; Kilbrittain	Eleanor; MacCarthy m. 1636	Denis; MacCarthy d. 1712; Springhouse
Finghin; 1625–1676	John de Courcy; 21st Baron; Kingsale d. 1667	Ellen; MacCarthy; Reagh	Justin; MacCarthy; 1685–1756

Legend

XXX	Subject of the article	XXX	Princes of Carbery	XXX	Viscounts; Muskerry	XXX	Barons; Kingsale

*d.v.p. = predeceased his father (decessit vita patris)

MacCarthy seems to have been the only son and perhaps even the only child of his parents. At least Lainé names no brothers or sisters of his.

== From prince to esquire ==
MacCarthy's grandfather was the 17th Prince of Carbery. He lost this title in 1606 in a surrender and regrant to King James I when the King confirmed the freehold of the lands but granted no title. The King probably expected a payment or at least the conversion to Protestantism. The MacCarthys of Muskerry, who were in a similar situation, obtained a viscountcy in 1628, probably for a payment. From the rank of a prince therefore MacCarthy's grandfather fell to that of a commoner. At the death of his grandfather there was no title to succeed. At that time MacCarthy was a minor. The inheritance was given to MacCarthy, who was called esquire of Kilbrittain. (Note: Esquire: Bernard Burke calls him so.)

== Marriage and children ==
MacCarthy married Ellen Roche, eldest daughter of David Roche, 7th Viscount Fermoy.

Donal and Ellen had at least one son:

- Charles, succeeded as esquire of Kilbrittain and married Eleanor MacCarthy, born from his stepfather's 1st marriage.

After MacCarthy's death in or before 1599 Ellen remarried to Charles MacCarthy, 1st Viscount Muskerry, who thus became Charles's stepfather. This was also Muskerry's second marriage. From his first marriage Muskerry had a daughter Eleanor who became Charles's wife. Charles therefore married his stepfather's daughter from a previous marriage.

After Muskerry's death in 1641 Ellen married thirdly and last Thomas Fitzmaurice, 3rd son of Thomas Fitzmaurice, 18th Baron Kerry by his second wife Julia Power.

== Death and timeline ==
The dates of MacCarthy's death and of his widow's remarriage are disputed. Some propose 1599 or earlier, others 1636 or later. The earlier date is too near (26 years) to Ellen's father's birth in 1573.

MacCarthy was succeeded by his son Charles, who married Eleanor MacCarthy, daughter of his stepfather Charles MacCarthy, 1st Viscount of Muskerry from his first marriage.

Timeline
As his birth date is uncertain, so are all his ages.
Age	Date	Event
0	1570, about	Born
28–29	1599, in or before	Died
30–31	1601, 22 Sep	The Spanish landed at Kinsale
32–33	1603, 24 Mar	Accession of King James I, succeeding Queen Elizabeth I
35–36	1606	Grandfather lost his title as prince of Carbery
41–42	1612	Succeeded his grandfather as esquire of Kilbrittain
54–55	1625, 27 Mar	Accession of King Charles I, succeeding King James I
65–66	1636	Died

== Notes and references ==
=== Sources ===
- Burke, Bernard (1883). A Genealogical History of the Dormant, Abeyant, Forfeited and Extinct Peerages of the British Empire (New ed.). London: Harrison. OCLC 499232768. – (for Ellen Roche)
- Butler, William F. T. (1904). "The Barony of Carbery" (PDF). Journal of the Cork Historical and Archaeological Society. 10 (61): 1–10. – West Carbery
- Cokayne, George Edward (1936). Doubleday, H. A (ed.). The complete peerage of England, Scotland, Ireland, Great Britain and the United Kingdom, extant, extinct, or dormant. Vol. IX (2nd ed.). London: St Catherine Press. – Moels to Nuneham
- Dunlop, Robert (1893). "MacCarthy Reagh, Florence". In Lee, Sidney (ed.). Dictionary of National Biography. Vol. XXXIV. London: Smith, Elder, & Co. pp. 441–443. OCLC 8544105.
- Cokayne, George Edward (1893). Complete peerage of England, Scotland, Ireland, Great Britain and the United Kingdom, extant, extinct, or dormant. Vol. V (1st ed.). London: George Bell and Sons. OCLC 1180836840. – L to M (for Muskerry)
- Fryde, Edmund Boleslaw; Greenway, D. E.; Porter, S.; Roy, I., eds. (1986). Handbook of British Chronology. Royal Historical Society Guides and Handbooks, No. 2 (3rd ed.). London: Offices of the Royal Historical Society. ISBN 0-86193-106-8. – (for timeline)
- Gibson, Charles Bernard (1861). The History of the County and City of Cork. Vol. I. London: Thomas C. Newby. OCLC 1046580159. – to 1603
- Gillespie, Raymond (2006). Seventeenth-Century Ireland: Making Ireland Modern. Dublin: Gill & MacMillan. ISBN 978-0-7171-3946-0.
- Graves, James (1871). "Unpublished Geraldine Documents (continued)". The Journal of the Royal Society of Antiquaries of Ireland. 3rd. 1 (2): 591–616. doi:10.2307/25506599.
- Joyce, Patrick Weston (1903). A Concise History of Ireland from the Earliest Times to 1837 (12th ed.). Dublin: M. H. Gill & Son. OCLC 815623752.
- Lainé, P. Louis (1836). "Mac-Carthy". Archives généalogiques et historiques de la noblesse de France [Genealogical and Historical Archives of the Nobility of France] (in French). Vol. Tome cinquième. Paris: Imprimerie de Bethune et Plon. pp. 1–102. OCLC 865941166.
- Lodge, John (1789). Archdall, Mervyn (ed.). The Peerage of Ireland or, A Genealogical History of the Present Nobility of that Kingdom. Vol. II. Dublin: James Moore. OCLC 264906028. – Earls
- McCarthy, Samuel Trant (1922). The MacCarthys of Munster. Dundalk: The Dundalgan Press. OCLC 1157128759.
- Moody, Theodore William; Martin, F. X.; Byrne, Francis John, eds. (1984). A New History of Ireland. Vol. IX:Maps, Genealogies, Lists. Oxford: Oxford University Press. ISBN 0-19-821745-5.
- O'Hart, John (1892). Irish Pedigrees: Or, the Origin and Stem of the Irish Nation. Vol. I (5th ed.). Dublin: James Duffy & Co. OCLC 7239210. – Irish stem
- Ohlmeyer, Jane H. (2004). "MacCarthy, Donough, first earl of Clancarty (1594–1665)". In Matthew, Colin; Harrison, Brian (eds.). Oxford Dictionary of National Biography. Vol. 35. New York: Oxford University Press. pp. 107–108. ISBN 0-19-861385-7.
- Ó Siochrú, Micheál (October 2009). "Roche, David". Dictionary of Irish Biography.
