= Katherine Fitzgerald, Lady of Hy-Carbery =

Katherine FitzGerald
- Lady of Hy-Carbery
- Tenure: 1477–1506
- Predecessor: Ellen MacCarthy of Muskerry
- Successor: Ellen MacCarthy Muskerry, daughter of Cormac Laidir MacCarthy, 4th Lord of Muscry
- Known for: Black Lady
- Born: c.1452
- Died: 1506; Castle Salem
- Spouse: Finghin MacCarthy Reagh
- Issue: Donal MacCarthy Reagh; Donogh MacCarthy Reagh; Dermod MacCarthy Reagh; Cormac MacCarthy Reagh; Ellen MacCarthy Reagh
- Parents: Thomas FitzGerald; Ellice de Barry

Katherine Fitzgerald (c.1452-1506) was an Anglo-Irish noblewoman of the Geraldine's dynasty during the 15th century. At the time of her birth, her family was one of the most influential houses in Ireland. By her husband, her married name was Mac Carthaigh Riabhach and she became the princess of Carbery from 1477 to 1506.

For her own pleasure, she erected two castles.

== Family ==
Katherine was probably born in 1452, in one of the Fitzgerald castles. Katherine was the eldest of their daughters and the third child of the 7th Earl of Desmond by his wife. Her father, Thomas FitzGerald, one of the most powerful men in Ireland, was Viceroy of Ireland in the reign of Edward IV; after being the victim of the malice of the Queen, Elizabeth Woodville, having made an unfortunate speech in reference to her low birth, he was executed at Drogheda, on 15 February 1468. Her mother, Ellice Barry, secondly married Maurice 'Mor' FitzGibbon, 6th White Knight. She mothered Sir John FitzGibbon who held the office of Lord Justice of Ireland and Maurice 'Oge' Fitzgibbon, 7th White Knight (d.1530). She had seven brothers and one sister, four of which acceded to the Earldom of Desmond:

1. James FitzThomas FitzGerald. c.1449-1487, probably murdered by his brother, John.
2. Maurice FitzThomas FitzGerald. c.1450-1520.
3. Thomas FitzThomas FitzGerald. 1454-1534.
4. Unnamed boy #1, c.1456-1468 who was murdered by John Tiptoft, 1st Earl of Worcester.
5. Unnamed boy #2,
6. John FitzGerald, de facto 12th Earl of Desmond, c.1460-1536 whose male descendants were extinct in 1632.
7. Ellen Fitzgerald, c.1462 who married Tagd O’Brien of Killaloe.
8. Gerald Oge Fitzgerald, c.1464 whose male descendants were extinct in 1743.

== Character ==
The Annals of the Kingdom of Ireland by the Four Masters described her as "a charitable and truly hospitable woman". Also mentioned is her liking for castles and military strategy that a probable fosterage in McCarthy Muskerry's household may have favoured.

== Marriage ==
Probably between her fifteenth and twentieth years, between 1467 and 1472, after obtaining a plausible papal dispensation because her husband's sister married her maternal uncle, Katherine became Finghin MacCarthy Reagh's wife, who was her maternal uncle-by-marriage. She mothered four sons and one daughter:

1. Donal MacFineere MacCarthy Reagh, 9th Prince of Carbery;
2. Donogh MacFineere MacCarthy Reagh;
3. Dermod MacFineere MacCarthy Reagh;
4. Cormac MacFineere MacCarthy Reagh,
5. Ellen MacCarthy Reagh, married to James de Barry, Lord of Ibane.

== Lady of Hy-Carbery ==
By her husband, her married name was MacCarthaigh Riabhach and she became the princess of Carbery from 1477 to 1506. Through her Native Irish marriage, Katherine could bring her own moveable property to her marriage. And she could acquire more, often spending it without her husband's permission and reclaim it on her widowhood.

=== "Builder of castles" ===
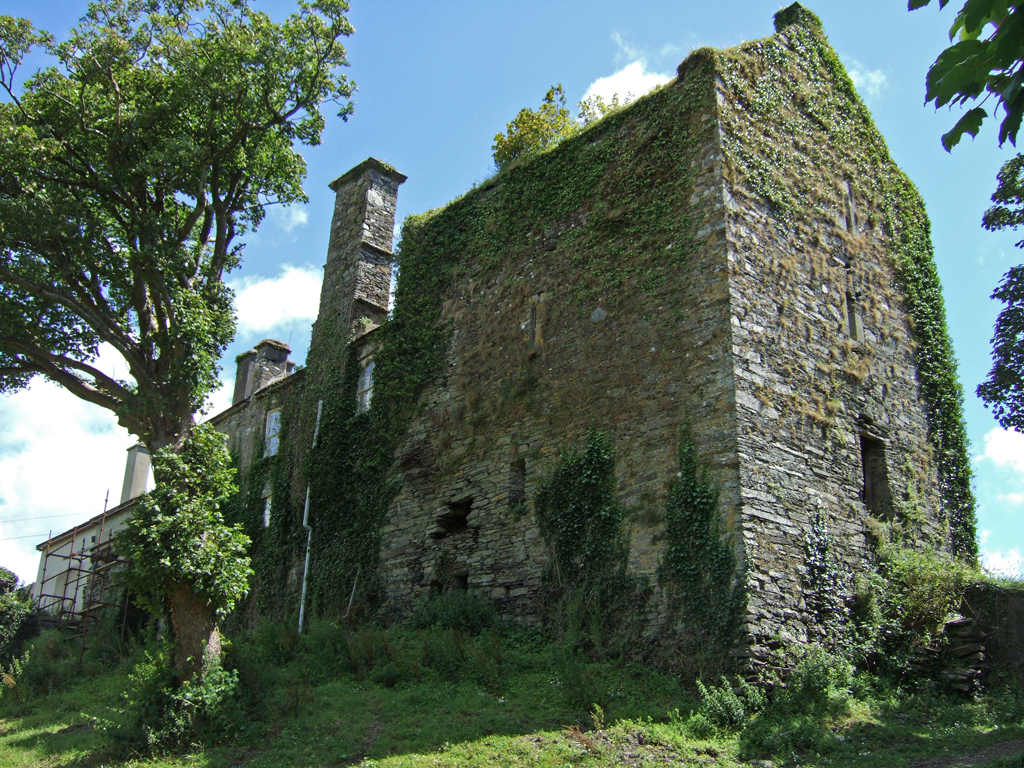
The Castle of Benduff, built by Katherine Fitzgerald

Benduff Castle, was built by Katherine Fitzgerald in 1470, probably before her marriage to Finghin MacCarthy Regh. It passed on to Carbery's ruling family on Katherine's marriage. After the rebellion of 1641, the MacCarthy Reagh were dispossessed and the castle fell into the hands of a Quaker by the name of Apollo Morris.

This beautiful castle is situated about 1 mile (1.6 km) to the northeast of Rosscarbery (County Cork), in the bosom of a secluded valley shut in by hills and at one time by a dense plantation of trees. It thus differed from the generality of the feudal strongholds which were either perched on a rocky eminence or surmounted the summit of some rising ground. But the sheltered and isolated position of this castle probably protected it from external danger.

Originally a strong structure, Benduff Castle was built in the usual style of the Norman fortresses which studded Ireland during the Middle Ages, distinguished for their square central keep or tower, with thick massive walls and loopholes for the use of arms as well as the admission of light, to which were generally attached side buildings furnished with bastions and strong outer walls enclosing the entire foundation — these latter being sometimes provided with covered ways. Benduff Castle has three internal arches. Its walls are 11 feet (3.4 m) thick, with passages and recesses, and the usual stone stairway. It was originally about 70 feet (21 m) high until old William Morris took the top off, and put on it a slated roof.

Dun-na-m-beann is a fort, near Dunmanway, a town 12 miles (19 km) west of Bandon (County Cork). Dr. Smith gives no account of the erection of this castle in his Natural and Civil History of Cork, where he deals with the origins of the city. The castle belonged to the clan of MacCarthy Gleannacroim, until about 1690, when it was forfeited due to the family supporting the Jacobite cause in the Williamite War in Ireland.

=== Book of Lismore ===
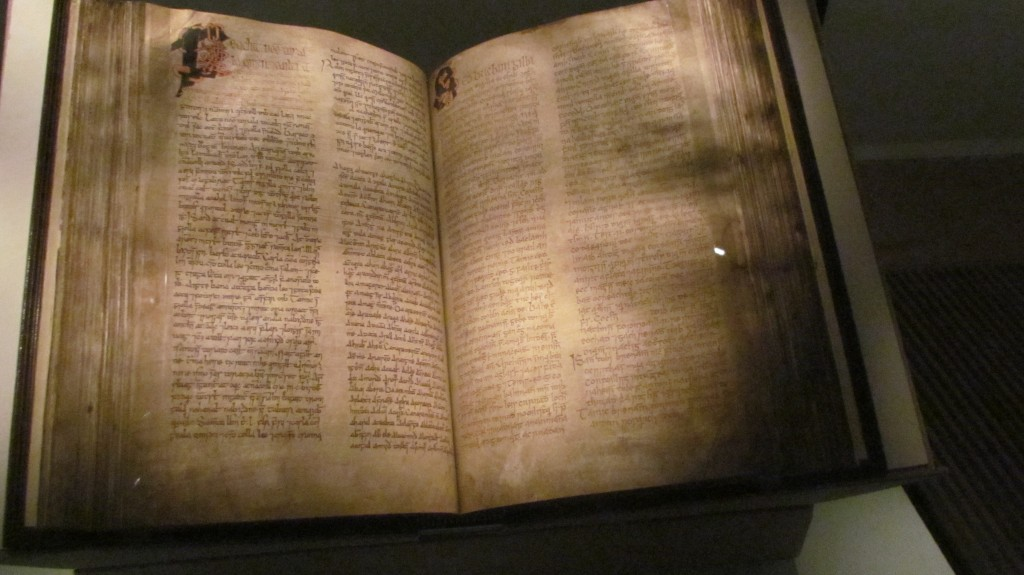
Leabhar Mhic Cárthaigh Riabhaigh commemorating the marriage of Finghin mac Carthy Reagh to Katherine.

Like her father, she supported Irish literature and music.

Leabhar Mhic Cárthaigh Riabhaigh was probably compiled to commemorate the marriage of Finghin MacCarthy Reagh to Katherine, daughter of the 7th Earl of Desmond. The book was written in Irish, but no Irish version of spoken today. The book contains several important texts, including the new Ever-Tongue, a cosmological work, with a very important guide to the lives of saints including St. Bridget, St. Patrick and St. Columba, a translation of the travels of Marco Polo and one of the greatest compositions of the Fenian Cycle, the Acallam na Senórach or the Conversation Old Man. Everything is embellished with illuminations.

The Book of Lismore was discovered in a wall of the castle of Lismore in 1811.

== Her death ==
The Annals of the Four Masters say that Katherine died in 1506 aged 54, a year after the death of her husband. Her eldest son, Donnell, seized the throne of Hy-Carbery after his uncle's death, some time before Katherine was dead.
