= Owen MacCarthy Reagh =

12th Prince of Carbery

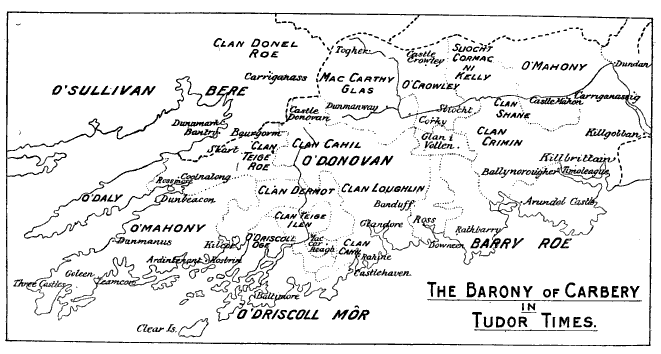
Carbery in Tudor times

Owen MacCarthy Reagh (Irish: Eoghan Mac Carthaigh Riabhach) (1520–1594) was the 16th Prince of Carbery from 1576 to 1593. He belonged to the MacCarthy Reagh dynasty. Owen was commonly referred to as "Sir" Owen MacCarthy (McCartie) in the English court records.

Owen was the fourth son of Donal MacCarthy Reagh, 12th Prince of Carbery (r. 1505–1531) by his wife Lady Eleanor, daughter of Gerald FitzGerald, 8th Earl of Kildare, Owen became tánaiste in 1567, when his next elder brother Donogh MacCarthy Reagh, 15th Prince of Carbery (r. 1567–1576), father of Florence MacCarthy, succeeded their elder brother Cormac na Haoine MacCarthy Reagh, 13th Prince of Carbery (r. 1531–1567).

He was succeeded by the son of his brother Cormac na Haoine, Donal of the Pipes, 17th Prince of Carbery.

== Career ==
Owen did not support Gerald FitzGerald, 15th Earl of Desmond during the Second Desmond Rebellion. Instead he allowed his forces of around 1200 fighting men to be employed by the Crown, and thus prevented much of the destruction that Carbery might have suffered if he had supported FitzGerald. He was accused of joining the rebellion in 1580, and may have given the appearance of it, but his friend Thomas Butler, the Earl of Ormond, prevailed upon him to cease whatever activity and convinced the government it was only local politics. MacCarthy Reagh's difficulties with the Crown's sub-sheriffs are suggested as the cause.

The total size of MacCarthy Reagh's forces is more difficult to determine. According to one count this included a peacetime 1,000 infantry and 30 knights, but according to another in 1588 his private forces greatly exceeded this, amounting to 60 horsemen, 80 professional soldiers, and 2,000 light infantry.

Owen also sat in the House of Lords of the Dublin Parliament of 1584–1585.

He was very influential in advancing the career of his nephew Florence, son of Donogh, at the expense of his nephew Donal of the Pipes, son of Cormac. Donal was his legal tánaiste but for some reason Owen favoured Florence, causing significant strife within the family, to be found discussed at length in the Life and Letters of Florence MacCarthy (see references). In 1592 Donal was finally able to oust the by then aged Owen, although leaving him a small estate and pension for his comfort until his death two years later in 1594.

Not long before, he earned the ire of the O'Mahony family when he tried to gain possession of one of their lordships after they had been dispossessed of it by the Crown government. MacCarthy Reagh was unsuccessful but it has been argued his efforts prevented the O'Mahonys from regaining the lordship themselves.

In or before 1592, the year he was deposed by his nephew Donal, MacCarthy Reagh was a witness in a lawsuit, along with his son-in-law Donal II O'Donovan, filed against them by O'Donovan's younger brother Teige, who alleged that his brother was a bastard who owed his entire position to Owen because of his marriage to his daughter Joanne, and that MacCarthy Reagh was himself an intruder, the lordship of Carbery supposedly belonging to his nephew Donal of the Pipes all along. The suit was filed by Teige in conjunction with the declaration of an intent by MacCarthy and O'Donovan to surrender clan lands for the purpose of obtaining a regrant (and which did not take place until 1608). As the English court supported the concept of a grant and regrant, the suit by Teige was not successful, with Lord Chancellor Adam Loftus deciding Owen MacCarthy Reagh's was the rightful and legitimate MacCarthy Reagh.

== Sons and descendants ==
Despite his being deposed by Donal in 1592, Owen's two sons Finghin and Donogh retained considerable lands and power, joining the side of Hugh O'Neill and allying with Spain in the Nine Years' War despite Donal remaining loyal to the English Crown. Often together with their brothers-in-law Donal II O'Donovan and Sir Fineen O'Driscoll (and his son Cornelius), the activities of "Sir Owen MacCartie's sons" were closely watched by Sir George Carew and his spies. Both received money and fully equipped troop companies from Philip III of Spain to supplement their own forces, and among their expeditions joined Donal Cam O'Sullivan Beare to support Pedro de Zubiaur at Castlehaven.

Through Finghin's son Callaghan, Owen became the ancestor of several lines of MacCarthy counts and viscounts in France, his male heirs finally dying out with the last Count MacCarthy de la Marlière in 1925.

Among Owen's surviving descendants today, in the female line, is The O'Donovan, through his daughter Joanne/Johanna.

== Marriage and issue ==
Owen married Ellen O'Callaghan, daughter of Dermod O'Callaghan, Lord of Clonmeen, and they had issue:

1. Finghin/Florence, Lord of Iniskean, who married Eleanor, daughter of Edmund FitzGibbon, the White Knight.
  1. Catherine, married Dermod MacCarthy Glas, 2nd son of Teige-an-Duna MacCarthy, Lord of Glean-na-Chroim
  2. Callaghan/Caragh, (allegedly) created Viscount of Timoleague by James I of England, but from whom descended the later Counts MacCarthy de la Marlière and other families of France
2. Donogh Maol, who married Ne FitzGerald, daughter of Thomas Roe
3. Ellen, who married Sir Fineen O'Driscoll
4. Julia, who married Dermod O'Sullivan Mór, son of Donal O'Sullivan Mór
5. Eleanor, who married Finin Mac Owen Carragh of Kilbrittain
6. Johanna, who married Donal II O'Donovan, Lord of Clancahill
7. Honoria, who married Edmund FitzGerald, Knight of the Valley (Knight of Glin)
8. Graine, who married twice, 1) Barry Oge de Barry of Buttevant, 2) Cormac MacCarthy na Mona, son of Cormac Mac Teige MacCarthy of Muskerry

The ordering of Owen's daughters varies and in one source Johanna is given as the eldest.

== Ancestry ==
Ancestors of Owen MacCarthy Reagh

16. Donal Reagh MacCarthy
8. Dermod an Duna MacCarthy Reagh
17. Joanna FitzMaurice
4. Finghin MacCarthy Reagh
18. Teige MacCarthy, Lord of Muscry
9. Ellen MacCarthy
2. Donal MacCarthy Reagh
20. James FitzGerald, 6th Earl of Desmond
10. Thomas FitzGerald, 7th Earl of Desmond
21. Mary de Burgh
5. Catherine FitzGerald
22. William de Barry, 8th Baron Barry
11. Ellice de Barry
23. Ellen de la Roche
1. Owen MacCarthy Reagh
24. John FitzGerald, 6th Earl of Kildare
12. Thomas FitzGerald, 7th Earl of Kildare
25. Rose Basset
6. Gerald FitzGerald, 8th Earl of Kildare
26. James FitzGerald, 6th Earl of Desmond
13. Jane FitzGerald
27. Mary de Burgh
3. Eleanor FitzGerald
14. Rowland FitzEustace, 1st Baron Portlester
7. Alison FitzEustace

== Notes ==
Regnal titles
Preceded by Donogh MacCarthy Reagh	Prince of Carbery; 1576–1592	Succeeded by Donal of the Pipes
