= Teige-an-Duna MacCarthy =

Last hereditary Prince of the Dunmanway branch

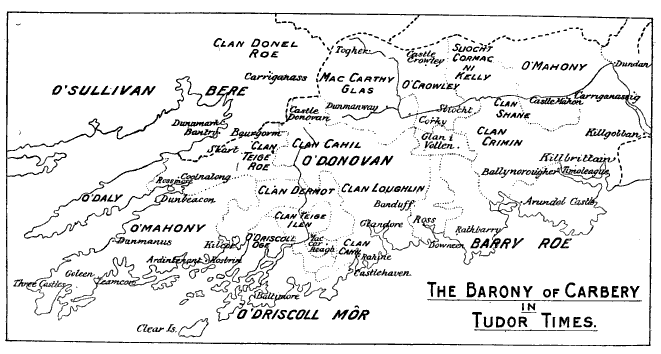
Carbery in Tudor times

Teige-an-Duna MacCarthy (Irish: Tadhg an Duna Mac Carthaigh) (1584 – 24 May 1649), Lord of Glean-na-Chroim, was the last hereditary Prince of the Dunmanway branch of the MacCarthy Reagh dynasty of Carbery "who exercised the rights of his position." He was Prince from 1618 to 1648, dying the following year on 24 May 1649. He was also known as Teige the Hospicious for his great hospitality, while his epithet an Duna means "of the Fortress".

During the so-called Insurrection of 1641, Teige-an-Duna was second in command of the MacCarthy Reagh forces. For this his family were dispossessed by the Cromwellians.

He was the son of Eleanor, daughter of Rory MacSheehy, and Teige-an-Fhorsa MacCarthy ("Teige of the Forces"), Lord of Glean-na-Chroim.

== Marriages and issue ==
Teige-an-Duna first married a daughter of Brian mac Owen Mac Sweeny of Cloghda, by whom he had 1) Teige-an-Fhorsa II MacCarthy, and 2) Dermod MacCarthy Glas, ancestor of MacCarthy Glas. He married secondly Honoria, daughter of Donal II O'Donovan, Lord of Clancahill, by Lady Joanna MacCarthy Reagh, daughter of Ellen O'Callaghan and Owen MacCarthy Reagh, 12th Prince of Carbery, by whom he had 3) Honoria, who married Owen son of Donal of the Pipes, 17th Prince of Carbery, 4) Joan, who married Cormac MacTadhg MacCarthy, of Ballea, grandson of Sir Cormac MacTadhg, lord of Muscry, 5) Eoghan, and 6) Ceallaghan, living in Dunmanway Castle with his mother in 1652.

== Notes ==
Preceded by Teige-an-Fhorsa MacCarthy	Lord of Glean-na-Chroim; 1618–1648	Succeeded by Teige-an-Fhorsa II MacCarthy (nominal)
