= Castle Salem, Cork =

Fortified house in County Cork, Ireland

Coordinates: 51.595881°N 9.056028°W

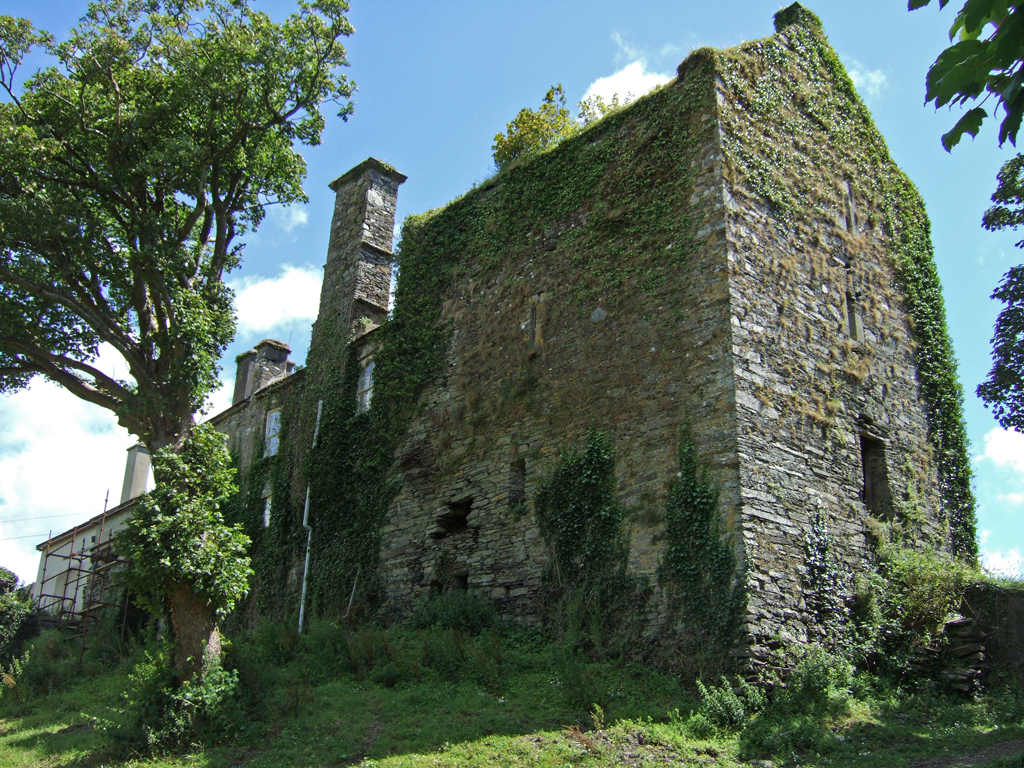
Castle Salem

Castle Salem is a fortified house near Rosscarbery, in County Cork, Ireland. The house was home to the Morris family from around 1660 until the early 1800s, and was bought in 1895 by the Daly family, descendants of whom now run it as a guest house.

== History ==
=== Construction ===
According to Charles Smith, who terms it "a strong romantic building", Benduff Castle was built by the O'Donovans. However, it was almost certainly built around 1470 by Catherine Fitzgerald, daughter of Thomas, 7th Earl of Desmond, who married Finghin MacCarthy Reagh. The Annals of the Four Masters says that she died in 1506. This Earl, one of the most powerful men in Ireland, was Viceroy of Ireland under Edward IV, and was executed at Drogheda in 1466, having fallen a victim, it is said, to the malice of Edward's Queen, Elizabeth Grey, in consequence of his having made a disrespectful speech in reference to her to that King. Earl Thomas's daughter is probably the person who has come down to us as "The Black Lady," of whom various legends were told in connection with Benduff.

The ancient Castle of Benduff (Irish: Bhinn Dubh, "The Black Peak"), now called Castle Salem (sometimes referred to as Castlesalem, Castle Sally and Mount Salem), is situated about a mile to the north-west of Rosscarbery, in the bosom of a secluded valley shut in by hills and at one time by a dense plantation of trees. It thus differed from the generality of the feudal strongholds of old which were either perched on a rocky eminence or surmounted the summit of some rising ground. But the sheltered and isolated position of this castle probably protected it from external danger.

Originally a strong structure, Benduff Castle was built in the usual style of the Norman fortresses which studded Ireland during the Middle Ages, distinguished for their square central keep or tower, with thick massive walls and loop holes for the use of arms as well as the admission of light, to which were generally attached side buildings furnished with bastions, and strong outer walls enclosing the entire foundation — these latter being sometimes provided with covered ways. Benduff Castle has three internal arches; its walls were 11 feet thick, with passages and recesses, and the usual stone stairway. It was originally about 70 feet high till William Morris took the top off, and put on it a slated roof.

=== Cromwellian conquest of Ireland ===
The lands of Knocknamadogue with the Castle of Benduff had been the property of Florence McCarthy, a Roman Catholic rebel whose estates were forfeited to Oliver Cromwell's forces. Ballihagornagh (Barley Hill) had belonged to John Marrigoe, who had a similar history, and most of the rest of the lands had been in the possession of the O'Donovans.

Captain William Morris (abt. 1620–1680) was given over 1500 acres of land, including the castle, and he changed the name to Castlesalem. This was in around 1660. The land was formally granted in a grant under the act of settlement in 1678:

To William Morris, gent. Knocknamadogue, to be forever called Montsalem, 252 acres— Kemanabrickey, to be named Libott-Wood, 92 acres—Balanagornaganey, to be called Longnor, 66 acres—Manulagawne or Mullagowne, to be called Mount Stafford, 93 acres 2 roods—Kilbegg, to be called Stoney Furlong, 54 acres—Maulmurreene, to be called Green Furlong, 34 acres 2 roods— Knockrudeene (part) to be called Narrow Furlong, 11 acres—In the Baronies of East and West Carbery. The total quantity being 976 acres 3 roods statute measure at a total rent of £9.3.1 3/4 per annum. Dated 4 September 20 year Charles II. Enrolled 17 September 1666. By patent of 1 November 1678 Mr Morris had an abatement of £2.3.1. 1/3 of his annual rent, so that same was reduced to £7 per annum.

To Captain William Morris. In ye West part of Dunscullis alias Downescully 13 acres (to be forever called by the name of Burton)—Gortroe, 101 acres in ye East part of Dungannon (to be called Wostason)—26 acres (to be called Netley)—in ye East part of Drumuliky 5 acres (to be called ye Mill Pasture), the total quantity being 234 acres 3 roods 18 perches statute measure at a total rent of £2.3.10 3/4 per annum.

=== William Morris and the Quakers ===
William Morris despite having been a Cromwellian soldier became a Quaker in 1656 and was an active member of the emerging Friends community in Ireland. John Rutty gives an interesting account from the Journal of William Edmondson who describes Captain Morris as a man of talents and influence:

There was also one William Morris, an Elder amongst the Baptists in great repute. Captain of a Company, Justice of the Peace, Commissioner of the Revenues, Chief Treasurer in that Quarter, also Chief Governor of three garrisons, to whom the news of this day's work was soon carried, whereat he was much troubled in mind and told the messenger who was a justice of the peace 'it was a shame for them to suffer us to be so abused' saying 'the time would come that they would be glad to shelter under our wings'. The Rumour soon went amongst the Baptists and to the court at Dublin that Captain Morris was turned Quaker, whereupon he was removed with his company southward; not long after he was sent to Dublin to appear before the General and chief officers, many of whom were Baptists. He was examined about his being turn'd Quaker which he did not deny, but confessed our Faith and Principles and at that time was discharg'd from his command because he was a Quaker. He was a worthy wise man, had a Testimony in our Meetings and died in the Faith of Jesus. I was at Dublin at the time when they took his command from him. He would often say that I was a great help and strength to him in the truth. He was serviceable upon many occasions with the Government in appearing on behalf of suffering Friends, tho' he was also divers times a sufferer in bonds for his testimony. He wrote an excellent short Treatise entitled Tythes No Gospel Ordinance, (printed 1659).

During 1656 William formed a Quaker meeting in Belturbet, County Cavan, with William Parker and his wife and Robert Wardell and his father. Sometime later in 1656 he was discharged from his post and returned to Cork. Like many educated men of his time with financial means he used his influence as a vehicle for change. William had published in 1659 a short treatise entitled Tythes no gospel ordinance. He attempts to prove by reference to Scripture that "Tythes are unjust to rich and poor alike" and like many Friends this was to get him into trouble with the establishment.

William also wrote a treatise to the English Parliament in 1659, "To the Supream Authoritie (under God) of the Commonwealth of England, Scotland, and Ireland, the Commons in Parliament Assembled. The true and faithfull Testimony of William Morris, a late Member of the Army in Ireland" (London, Printed for Thomas Simmons, at the Bull and Mouth, near Aldersgate. 4to. 1659). The work seeks to challenge Parliament about the persecution of Quakers in Ireland by Henry Cromwell, Oliver’s fourth son. Henry's principal objective in Ireland was to secure the authority of the Protectorate and to crush all disloyalty. He opposed the Baptists among the soldiers and civilian administrators because of their close association with republicans. By late 1656, Henry had succeeded in forcing leading Baptist officers to resign their commissions or to leave Ireland. He discouraged the spread of Quakerism into Ireland by arresting Quaker missionaries and dismissing army officers who appeared susceptible to their message. On the other hand, he encouraged moderate Presbyterian and Independent clergymen to come over to Ireland. Having suppressed the radicals, Henry worked to reconcile the main Protestant groupings, to gain the support of the gentry and to stabilise the administration. The policy of land seizure and transplanting the native Irish was largely carried out before his appointment as Lord-Deputy, so although he remained suspicious and watchful, Henry's treatment of the Irish Catholics tended to be moderate. Henry supported the succession of his brother Richard to the office of Lord Protector in 1658, but was powerless to prevent the collapse of the Protectorate the following year. He resigned as Lord-Deputy in June 1659 and the Restoration of Charles II just one year away in May 1670.

The work that could have cemented William as a major Quaker theologian and author, written with George Fox and John Perrot, was entitled "Severall [sic] Warnings to the Baptised People", published in 1659.

Like many of the early Friends William was to suffer for his beliefs and was imprisoned on a number of occasions. Joseph Besse writing in 1753 told how in 1660:

In the County of Cork, William Morris, William Brimsby, Walter Castle, and John Exham, being met with others in Edward Cooke's House at Bandon-bridge, were committed to Goal by John Laundon, Provost, and put into a nasty Dungeon, where they were kept two Weeks, their Friends not being admitted to bring them Food, but as it was given them through a Grate, and the Provost was offended with the Gaoler's Wife, for suffering some Straw to be brought them to lie on.

Following his treatise against the payment of tithes in 1663/4 Paul and William Morris were sued for tithes by the Archdeacon of Ross but the Archdeacon died suddenly under circumstances which so affected his brother clergy that for some years the Morrises were not again sued for tithes: "A Testimony against John Reeve & Lodowick Muggleton, by the Quakers of Cork", signed by Wm. Morris, Wm. Edmondson, Robert Sandham and 23 others with Muggleton's Sentence of damnation upon them. And the names of many other Friends & things concerning Friends are scattered throughout the vol."

George Fox (1624–1691), the founder of the Quaker faith, despite being unwelcome visited Ireland in 1669. He first visited Bandon then went on to Cork. The mayor was not keen to welcome Fox to Cork. Paul Morris was a brother of William Morris and acted as the guide to George Fox when he rode through the streets of Cork unharmed though there were warrants out against him and even the Mayor recognised him. The Morrises were clearly people of influence.

Fox describes how:

When we came near the town, Friends would have shown me a way through the back side of it; but I told them my way was through the streets. Taking Paul Morrice to guide me through the town, I rode on. As we rode through the market-place, and by the mayor's door, he, seeing me, said, "There goes George Fox"; but he had not power to stop me. When we had passed the sentinels, and were come over the bridge, we went to a Friend's house and alighted. There the Friends told me what a rage was in the town, and how many warrants were granted to take me. While I was sitting there I felt the evil spirit at work in the town, stirring up mischief against me; and I felt the power of the Lord strike at that evil spirit. By-and-by some other friends coming in, told me it was over the town, and amongst the magistrates that I was in the town. I said, "Let the devil do his worst." After we had refreshed ourselves, I called for my horse, and having a Friend to guide me, we went on our way.

=== William Penn ===
Apart from George Fox the other most widely known Quaker is William Penn (1644–1718). As a close friend William Penn was often at Castlesalem, particularly in the early months of 1670. Writing in his "Irish Journal" Penn frequently talks of his time with William Morris. At this time Morris was one of the most prominent Friends in the South of Ireland and clearly respected and admired by William Penn who had him act as his agent in Cork collecting rents etc. Penn stayed or visited Castle Salem on 21 February 1670, 23 February 1670, 24 February 1670, 25 February 1670, 26 March 1670, 29 March 1670 – 3 April 1670, 6 April 1670, 16 April 1670. There may have been other times but these are not recorded.

Penn wrote some of his Great Case of Liberty of Conscience Once More Briefly Debated and Defended at Castle Salem, as he refers to it a number of times in his diary.

=== The New House (1682) ===
Rutty describes the death of William in 1680: "This year died William Morris of Castle Salem in the Co of Cork, who though a man of great parts and wisdom, was convinced of Truth by a weak instrument". Following the death of his father in 1680, Fortunatus Morris built a new house on to the fortress at Benduff. It is L-shaped, the tower being at the angle of the 'L'. It is built of small pieces of bad stone, with a high outside chimney and two gables. Fortunatus’ house was built at its rear against the old building, and from the first landing of its stairs one could step into the Castle by the ancient doorway which was placed about 12 feet from the ground. Later a Georgian hall door was added. The gardens were very extensive and laid out in old Dutch style with ponds, little islands and clipped yew trees.

=== 19th century ===
The Morris family still lived in the castle at the beginning of the 19th century. It was described in 1815 in Townsend's Survey as the seat of William Morris. There was an "old house joined to a castle of still greater antiquity, standing on a rock rising in the centre of a small romantic vale surrounded by steep and lofty hills. Of the trees that were formerly very abundant many still remain, amongst which are a yew and some beech of great size. A very singular circumstance occurs here of a rookery in a grove of laurels".

The castle was offered for sale at the encumbered estates court on 3 June 1853 and was bought by a Dr. Fitzgibbon for £1,350. In 1870 it was in the hands of Mrs Eliza Fitzgibbon.

Patrick Daly bought the castle in 1895 from the Fitzgibbons and three generations of the family have now farmed the land. Under the stewardship of Michael and Margaret Daly and their family the Castle tower has been partially restored. It is still a working farm and offers bed and breakfast as well as tours.
