= Nicholas Tuite MacCarthy =

Irish Jesuit preacher

Nicholas Tuite MacCarthy (May 1769 – 3 May 1833) was a renowned Jesuit preacher in late-18th- and early-19th-century France. He was known also as the Abbé de Lévignac. He was of noble birth, being a member of the MacCarthy Reagh family of Springhouse, Bansha, County Tipperary in Ireland who were Princes of Carbery and who were subsequently recognised as counts in France.

== Biography ==
Nicholas was born in Dublin, but left Ireland for Toulouse with his parents when he was four years of age. Over the succeeding six decades he dedicated his life to preaching throughout France and Europe. Tuite MacCarthy, who grew up at the family's palatial townhouse at 3, Rue Mage in the city of Toulouse was profoundly affected by the death in childbirth of a sister-in-law, wife of Viscount (later Count) Robert MacCarthy, deputy for the Drome in 1815–20. He then resolved to study for the priesthood, which he did, firstly in the College du Plessis, and afterwards at the Sorbonne, Paris. On account of the Revolution, which broke out in France in May, 1789, and subsequently as the result of an accident whereby his spine was strained when he fell from a rickety stairs as he was carrying an immense bundle of firewood, to a frail old woman in an attic, his college career was interrupted. When his health had sufficiently improved, he resumed his theological studies in 1813, at the age of forty-four years in the seminary of Chambéry, Savoie, and returned to complete his studies in Paris. He was ordained to the priesthood on 19 June 1814, in his forty-sixth year. On his ordination, his strength was restored sufficiently for the exercise of his sacerdotal duties.

Toulouse was the scene of his first missionary labours, and he became known as l'Abbe MacCarthy, and was referred to also as l'Abbe de Levignac, after an estate which his father had purchased near Bordeaux, Gironde. In a short time he became famous as a preacher and theologian, and besides his eminent qualifications as an ecclesiastic, he was endowed with poetical talent, and composed Latin verse of a high order of merit. He preached in the presence of many distinguished audiences, even in Switzerland and in Rome. Louis XVIII, King of France, nominated him, in accordance with a privilege then existing in that country, to the Bishopric of Montauban, Tarn et Garonne, and the nomination was confirmed by Pope Pius VII. In his deep humility, Abbe MacCarthy did not accept the episcopal office, and when close to fifty years old, he joined the Society of Jesus in 1818. After a course of Lenten sermons at Annecy, Savoie, concluding on Easter Sunday, 7 April 1833, he was taken ill, and having expired in the Bishop's Palace in his 64th year, he was buried in the Cathedral there.

== Background ==
Nicholas Tuite MacCarthy was the second son of the eleven children of Justin MacCarthy of Toulouse (18 August 1744 – 1811), who was born at Spring House, near Bansha in County Tipperary and Maria (Mary) Winifred Tuite (September 1747 – 1822), daughter of Nicholas Tuite of St. Croix having relocated from the island of Montserrat. Nicholas Tuite MacCarthy's uncle, Robert Tuite, was chamberlain to the King of Denmark. His maternal grandfather, Nicholas Tuite of St. Croix, was the son of Richard Tuite of Tuitestown in County Westmeath. It was this Richard who fled Ireland as part of the Wild Geese in 1691 following an extraordinary family background in Ireland. Richard was one of only two surviving sons (the other being Robert) of Walter Tuite of Tuitestown and his wife, Margaret O'More, daughter of David O'More of Portallen in County Laois. Richard's remaining eleven brothers, Nicholas Tuite MacCarthy's great-granduncles, were all killed in the wars in Ireland in 1691.
