= Donal MacCarthy Reagh =

Prince of Carbery

Donal MacCarthy Reagh (Irish: Domhnall Mac Carthaigh Riabhach) (1450/1460 – 1531) was the 12th Prince of Carbery from 1505 to his death in 1531. He belonged to the MacCarthy Reagh dynasty, and was the son of Finghin MacCarthy Reagh, 10th Prince of Carbery, and Lady Catherine FitzGerald, daughter Thomas FitzGerald, 7th Earl of Desmond.

In some sources and pedigrees he is known as Donal (Donnell) MacFineere MacCarthy Reagh, although it is not known if this refers to his father or to some other aspect of his upbringing.

== Life ==
Donal's troops, commanded by his son Cormac na Haoine, assisted his kinsman Cormac Oge Laidir MacCarthy, 10th Lord of Muskerry in the Battle of Mourne Abbey in 1521 against James FitzGerald, 10th Earl of Desmond. The MacCarthys were victorious.

He was also an enlightened patron of the arts and letters, like his father.

== Marriages and issue ==
Donal first married Lady Ellen MacCarthy Muskerry, daughter of Cormac Laidir MacCarthy, 9th Lord of Muskerry, and they had issue two sons and one daughter:

1. Dermod, slain by Walter FitzGerald, son of the Earl of Kildare
2. Donal, who died without issue
3. Ellen, married Teige Mor O'Driscoll

He married secondly Lady Eleanor FitzGerald, daughter of Gerald FitzGerald, 8th Earl of Kildare, and they had issue four sons and three daughters:

1. Cormac na Haoine MacCarthy Reagh, 13th Prince of Carbery
2. Finghin, married Lady Catherine MacCarthy Mor, daughter of Donal an Drumin MacCarthy Mor, King of Desmond, but they left no issue
3. Donogh MacCarthy Reagh, 15th Prince of Carbery, father of Florence MacCarthy and Dermot Maol MacCarthy
4. Owen MacCarthy Reagh, 16th Prince of Carbery
1. Catherine, married Teige MacCarthy, 6th Lord of Muskerry
2. Shely, married Dermod An-Phudar O'Sullivan Beare
3. Ellinor, married Connor-Fin O'Meagher

== Notes ==
Regnal titles
Preceded by Finghin MacCarthy Reagh	Prince of Carbery; 1505–1531	Succeeded by Cormac na Haoine
