= Kilbrittain =

Village in County Cork, Ireland

Kilbrittain Irish: Cill Briotáin
- Village
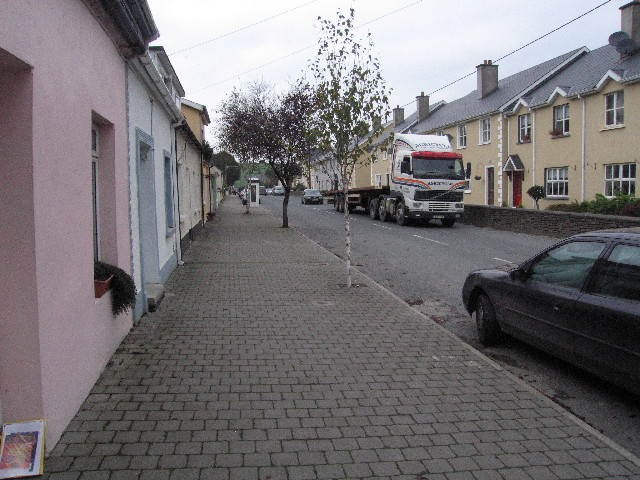
- Main Street

- Location in Ireland
- Coordinates: 51°40′24″N 8°41′17″W
- Country: Ireland
- Province: Munster
- County: Cork

Population (2022)
  - Total: 238
- Time zone: UTC+0 (GMT (WET))
  - Summer (DST): UTC+1 (IST (WEST))
- Irish Grid Reference: W561512

Kilbrittain or Killbrittain (Irish: Cill Briotáin, meaning 'Briotáin's church') is the name of a village, townland and parish in County Cork, Ireland. The village is about 8 km (5 mi) south of Bandon, and near Courtmacsherry and Timoleague. The coastal route around the edge of the parish is the R600 road, while the village itself is around 3 km (2 mi) inland. The village is in a civil parish of the same name.

== Local estates ==
Kilbrittain Castle is reputed to be one of the oldest inhabited castles in Ireland. The castle is thought to date from 1035 where the original fortress may have been built by the O'Mahony clan. Known to have been in the hands of the Norman family of de Courcey and possibly extended in the 13th century, Kilbrittain Castle was the principal seat of MacCarthy Reagh family, Princes of Carbery and Kings of Desmond, from the early 15th century. The castle was extensively restored and enlarged by the Stawell family in the 18th and 19th centuries. It was partially burned in 1920 and restored in 1969 by inventor Russell Winn. Kilbrittain Castle is now the home of the Cahill-O'Brien family.

Howes Strand is a beach in Kilbrittain with the ruin of a Coast Guard station that overlooks the beach, built in 1910 and burnt down in 1920.

Coolmain Castle was originally built by the de Courcey family in the early 15th century, but they lost it to the MacCarthy Reaghs the following century. Over the years it passed through the hands of a number of families, including that of the Earls of Cork. In the middle of the 17th century, Oliver Cromwell acquired the property. In the early 1900s it was owned by the novelist Donn Byrne, and was bought by Roy E. Disney in the 1990s.

== Sport ==
Kilbrittain GAA club fields Gaelic football and hurling teams and is affiliated with Cork GAA and Carbery GAA. The club was founded in 1904. The club won the Cork Minor C Football Championship in 2008 beating Castletownbere in the final at Páirc Uí Chaoimh.

== Amenities ==
There are two primary schools in Kilbrittain. Gurraneasig National School is located near to Howes Strand and (as of 2009) had approximately 60 pupils enrolled. Kilbrittain National School is a co-educational school which is located in the village, close to the church. As of 2011, Kilbrittain National School had over 150 pupils enrolled. Both schools take part in GAA leagues called Sciath na Scol. Kilbrittain NS have won it with both the boys and girls team on several occasions.

There are several shops and cafés in the village. Local businesses include one of the first manufacturers of Irish-made tofu.

== Culture and events ==
Each summer, the owners of Burren House, which overlooks Courtmacsherry Bay, hold an open-air opera to raise funds in aid of the Courtmacsherry Lifeboat. Annually in August, Kilbrittain hosts a family festival. Kilbrittain Festival has been running since 2004. In 2011, a short film, The Blow-Ins, was shot in Kilbrittain and Courtmacsherry; the film was released in 2012.

The Kilbrittain Tractor Run occurs each year, with "hundreds of tractors" entering previous events.

== Kilbrittain whale ==
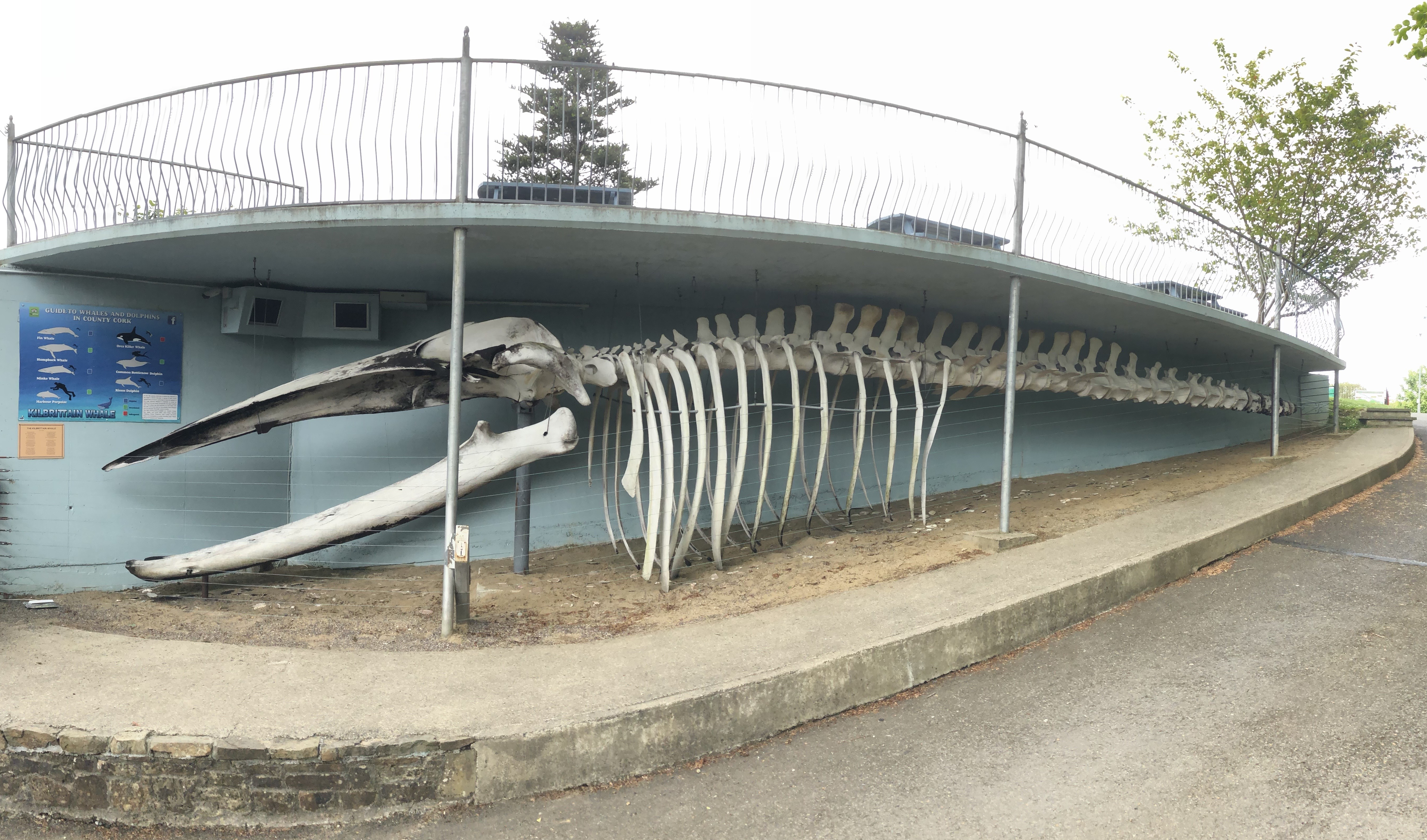
The skeleton of a fin whale displayed in the village.

On 15 January 2009, an 18-metre (59 ft) fin whale became stranded and subsequently died on a beach in Courtmacsherry Bay. Efforts were made by Courtmacsherry Lifeboat to get the whale back into the sea, but its size and weight meant that attempts to save the whale's life were unsuccessful. The whale was featured in a Channel 4 documentary Inside Nature's Giants which showed autopsies of large mammals.

There was some dispute as to whether Kilbrittain or Courtmacsherry had the claim to the whale and local songwriter, Michael O'Brien of Butlerstown, composed and recorded a humorous song on the topic titled "The Kilmacsherry Whale".

The skeleton of the whale is now on display in a small park to the east of Kilbrittain village.

== Book of Lismore ==
It is believed that the Book of Lismore was compiled in the 15th century to commemorate the marriage of the Gaelic prince Finghin Mac Cárthaigh Riabhach, of Kilbrittain Castle, to Caitilín, daughter of the seventh Earl of Desmond. The medieval manuscript contains 166 large vellum folios of material that a learned person of the time would have been expected to know. It later became known as Leabhar Mhic Cárthaigh Riabhaigh. MacCarthy was patron of the friary at Timoleague, and some of the book's pages were copied there in 1629 by the scribe Mícheál Ó Cléirigh.

During a raid on Kilbrittain in 1642, the book was taken by Lewis, Lord Kinalmeaky, of Lismore who sent it back to his father, with a letter, at Lismore Castle. The book remained there until it was discovered behind a wall at the castle in 1814, during rebuilding works.

The Book of Lismore is written in Irish, but not the modern version spoken today. It is written on vellum, made from calfskin, an expensive material at the time of the book's writing, in the 15th century. The Book of Lismore contains many important texts, including a cosmological work, the Ever-new Tongue; the most extensive account of the lives of the saints in an Irish-language medieval manuscript; an Irish translation of the travels of Marco Polo; and one of the greatest compositions of the Fenian Cycle, Acallam na Senórach, or The Conversation of the Old Men. The illustrated capitals are thought to have been added in the 19th century by Donnchadh Ó Floinn, an Irish-language scribe living on Shandon Street in Cork.

== People ==
- Donn Byrne - poet
- Roy Disney - nephew of Walt Disney, former owner of Coolmain Castle
- Charlie Hurley - Irish republican volunteer
- Florence MacCarthy - Irish prince
- Thaddeus MacCarthy - Bishop of Ross, Cork and Cloyne
- Dorothy Price - who contributed to the elimination of childhood TB; worked here as a dispensary doctor during the War of Independence
- Patrick Scott - architect and artist
- Eoin Sexton - Irish sportsman. He played Gaelic football with Kilbrittain and the Cork senior inter-county team
- Richard Townsend - English soldier and politician who lived at Kilbrittain Castle
- John P. Walsh - Irish businessman, Nationalist MP in the House of Commons
- Bob Willoughby - Hollywood photographer who lived at Coolmain Castle

== See also ==
- List of towns and villages in Ireland
