= James FitzGerald, 8th Earl of Desmond =

Noble (1459–1487)

James FitzGerald
- Earl of Desmond
- Tenure: 1467/8-1487
- Predecessor: Thomas FitzJames FitzGerald
- Successor: Maurice FitzThomas FitzGerald
- Born: 1459
- Died: 7 December 1487 (aged 27–28); Rathkeale
- Cause of death: murdered
- Buried: Youghal
- Spouse: Margaret O'Brien
- Parents: Thomas FitzJames FitzGerald; Ellice de Barry

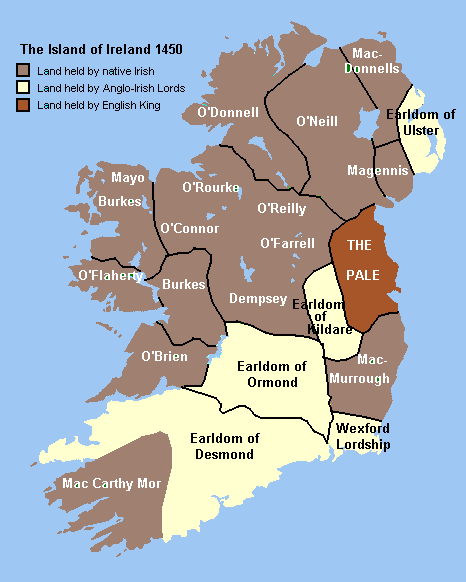
Ireland in 1450, with the Earldom of Desmond in the southwest

James FitzGerald, 8th Earl of Desmond (1459–1487) was the son of Thomas FitzGerald, 7th Earl of Desmond and his wife, Ellice de Barry, daughter of William Barry, 8th Baron Barry, and Ellen de la Roche.

== Life ==
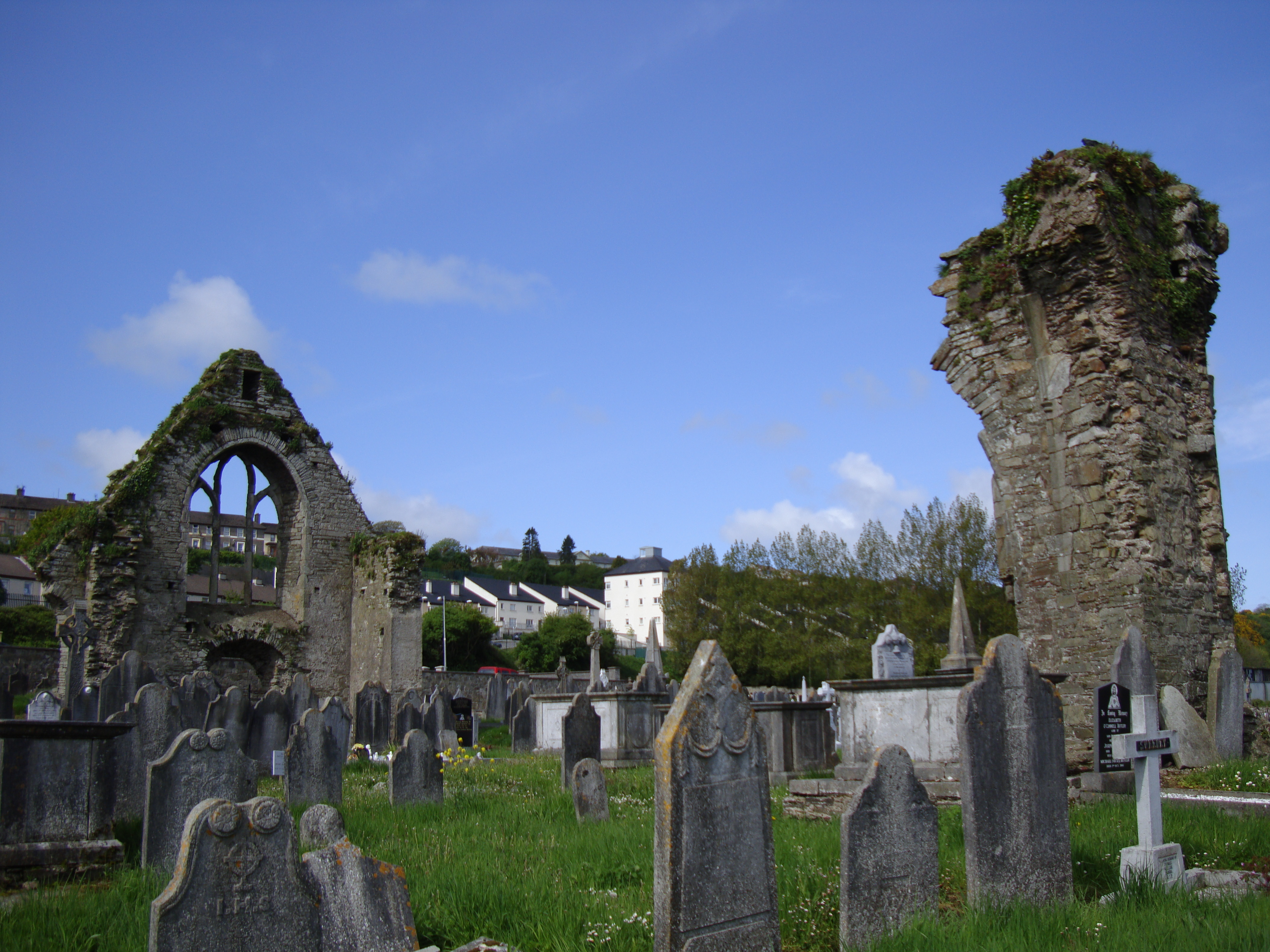
North Abbey, Youghal

The execution of the 7th Earl of Desmond provoked an immediate and violent reaction. The dead earl's elder sons ‘raised their standards and drew their swords, resolved to avenge their father’s murder’. James's younger brother, Gerald, laid waste a great deal in Leith and Munster in revenge for his father.

According to a later account, Edward IV admonished the new Earl of Desmond by letters, and promised them his pardon if they would lay down their arms, which they did. "Now James FitzThomas, having made terms with King Edward, and received immunity for any act which he had committed to avenge his father's death, became Earl of Desmond," in 1471.

The king felt the need to make amends to the dead earl's family, for in an attempt to conciliate Thomas’ son, James, who was then about twenty years of age, and whose title to the earldom the king clearly acknowledged immediately and unequivocally, despite Tiptoft's act of attainder, Edward IV granted him the palatinate of Kerry, together with the town and castle of Dungarvan. This grant may be thought to imply that in Edward's view an injustice had been done. He also extended to James and to his successors an extraordinary privilege: that of being free to choose not to appear in person before his deputy or the council in Ireland, but to send a representative instead. This privilege implies that Edward had understood and sympathised with the fact that inevitably the earl's family now felt very wary of risking putting themselves into the hands of the Anglo-Irish authorities.

James FitzGerald married Margaret, daughter of Thady O'Brien, Prince of Thomond. King Richard III. endeavoured to attach him to his interests, and sent him a collar of gold weighing 20 oz., with the device of a white boar, pendant from a circlet of roses and suns; also a "long gown of cloth of gold, lined with satin or damask; two doublets, one of velvet, and another of crimson satin; three shirts and kerchiefs; three stomachers; three pair of hose — one of scarlet, one of violet, and the third of black; three bonnets; two hats; and two tippets of velvet."

Notwithstanding these blandishments, the Earl augmented his Irish alliances, and retained his Irish habits. He was murdered at Rathkeale, 7 December 1487 (aged 28), by John Murtagh, one of his servants, at the instigation of his younger brother John. James FitzThomas FitzGerald was buried at Youghal. His sister Catherine married the MacCarthy Reagh. A book once her property (now known as the Book of Lismore) was discovered in a wall in Lismore Castle in 1811."

Ancestors of James FitzGerald, 8th Earl of Desmond

Maurice FitzGerald, 1st Earl of Desmond
Gerald FitzGerald, 3rd Earl of Desmond
Aveline fitz Nicholas
James FitzGerald, 6th Earl of Desmond
James Butler, 2nd Earl of Ormond
Eleanor Butler
Elizabeth Darcy
Thomas FitzGerald, 7th Earl of Desmond
Mary de Burgh
James FitzGerald, 8th Earl of Desmond
William Barry, 8th Baron Barry
Ellice de Barry
Ellen de la Roche

== Notes ==
Peerage of Ireland
Preceded by Thomas FitzJames FitzGerald	Earl of Desmond; 1467–1487	Succeeded by Maurice FitzThomas FitzGerald
