= Finghin Mac Cárthaigh =

King of Desmond in Ireland (1251–1261)

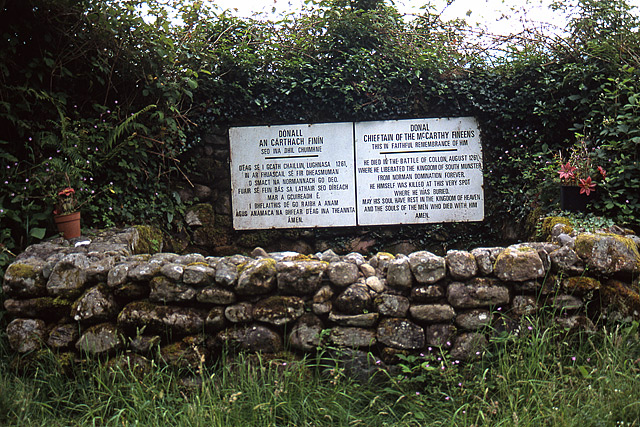
A memorial at the site of the Battle of Callann

Finghin MacCarthy, also known as Fineen of Ringrone (Irish: Finghin Reanna Róin Mac Cárthaigh), was King of Desmond from 1251 to his death in 1261, shortly after his famous victory over John FitzGerald, 1st Baron Desmond at the Battle of Callann. He was the son of Donal Gott MacCarthy, King of Desmond and founder of the MacCarthy Reagh dynasty, Princes of Carbery, and for that reason is considered to belong to them.

It was largely Finghin MacCarthy's victory against the Geraldines that preserved Gaelic Desmond for the next three centuries.
