= Donal Reagh MacCarthy, 5th Prince of Carbery =

Irish noble (b. 1365, d. 1414)

Donal MacCarthy Reagh (1365 – 1414) (Irish: Domhnall Mac Cárthaigh Riabhach), was the 5th Prince of Carbery. He was the elder son of the third prince and nephew of the fourth prince, and therefore the great-great-grandson of Donal Goth MacCarthy Mór, the King of Desmond. It is for this Donal that was given the sobriquet, riabhach (swarthy), due to his appearance. As such, this sept of the MacCarthy Clan was named after him, and are known as Mac Cárthaigh Riabhach (MacCarthy Reagh). He married Joanna FitzMaurice, the daughter of Maurice FitzGerald, the 4th Earl of Kildare, and his wife Elizabeth de Burghersh, 3rd Baroness Burghersh.
