= Carbery (barony) =

Ancient barony in Munster, Ireland

Carbery Cairbrigh
- 1262–1606
- The Mac Cárthaigh Riabhach who ruled as Princes of Carbery were descended from the kings of Desmond.

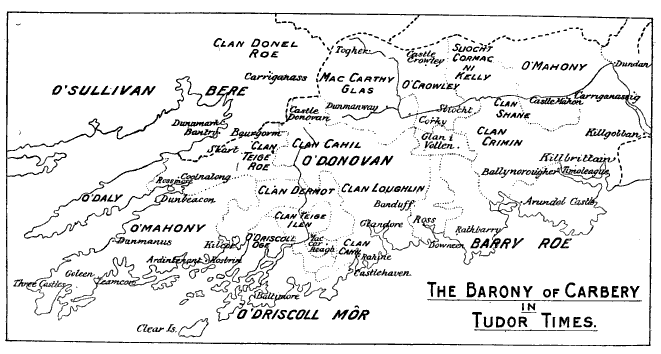
- A map of Carbery in Tudor times featuring the various Gaelic clans living in the area.
- Capital: Kilbrittain
- Common languages: Early Modern Irish, Latin
- Religion: Catholic Christianity; Gaelic tradition
- Government: Tanistry
- Rí
  - 1262–1310: Domhnall Maol Mac Cárthaigh Riabhach
  - 1558–1606: Domhnall na bpíob Mac Cárthaigh Riabhach
- History
  - Established: 1262
  - Disestablished: 1606
- ISO 3166 code: IE
Preceded by	Succeeded by
Kingdom of Desmond	Kingdom of Ireland
- Today part of: Ireland

Carbery, or the Barony of Carbery, was once the largest barony in Ireland, and essentially a small, semi-independent kingdom on the southwestern coast of Munster, in what is now County Cork, from its founding in the 13th century by Donal Gott MacCarthy to its gradual decline in the late 16th and early 17th centuries. His descendants, the MacCarthy Reagh dynasty, were its ruling family. The kingdom ended in 1606 when Donal of the Pipes, 17th Prince of Carbery surrendered the lordship of Carbery to the Crown of England under the surrender and regrant mechanism. His descendants maintained their position in Carbery until the Cromwellian confiscations which followed their participation in the Irish Rebellion of 1641.

Its modern descendants in name are the baronies of Carbery West and Carbery East, but Carbery once included territories from several of the surrounding baronies as well. To the north/northwest it shared a long and shifting border with the Kingdom of Desmond ruled by the rival MacCarthy Mor dynasty, and to the east/northeast an also shifting border with the vast Earldom of Desmond.

However, despite its small size in comparison to its neighbours, Carbery was one of the wealthiest principalities in Ireland. This wealth came not, for the most part, from its predominantly rocky lands, but from its numerous harbours and proximity to France and Spain. Some of the eastern portion of the principality was however quite fertile. The MacCarthys Reagh were reported to have the greatest income of all the Gaelic princes in Ireland. Only the Earls of Desmond, who were intermittently able to force the MacCarthys to pay them tribute in order to avoid continual harassment, (Note: The "Earl's beeves", as they were called. Although consistently beaten by the MacCarthys in pitched battles, the FitzGeralds of Desmond had at any given time approximately ten times the military resources at their command available to continually harass their neighbors. The Prince of Carbery had between 1000 and 1200 fighting men ready at any time. The Earl of Desmond had 10,000. This added up to a species of pseudo-overlordship, but importantly the MacCarthy Reagh did not support Desmond on hostings and thus remained a sovereign prince.) were wealthier.

In 1621, an Earldom of Carbery was created for John Vaughan, 1st Earl of Carbery, and this became extinct in 1713 with the death of John Vaughan, 3rd Earl of Carbery. Two years later, the barony was granted to the Anglo-Irish politician George Evans, whose descendants still hold the title of Baron Carbery.

== Name and founding ==
Seeds of the later Carbery kingdom began to develop in the 13th century. At 1200, the Uí Chairbre were primarily composed of and ruled by the Uí Donnobhains (now O'Donovans), occupying areas in their historical territory near Adare, Croom and Bruree. In both 1200 and 1205, MacCarthaigs are recorded as being in conflict with the Uí Chairbre.

At that time the Carbery region was still ruled by the powerful Eóganacht Raithlind in the form of the O'Mahonys, and to a lesser but still notable extent by the even more ancient Corcu Loígde in the form of the O'Driscolls. By 1232, Donal Gott MacCarthy and his sons had effected a decisive conquest and effected a major change in their territory. During the remainder of the 13th century, infighting and splintering within the MacCarthaigs led to the establishment of several MacCarthy septs, with territories in Duhallow, Coshmaine, Muscrery and what would become the larger clan lands of MacCarthy Mor and MacCarthy Reagh. By 1283, one of the MacCarthy splinter groups (and which would ultimately become the sept of MacCarthy Reagh) was noted as being part of the Ui Chairbre, when Domnall (i.e. Domnall Óc, a.k.a. Donal Maol), son of Domnall Cairprech MacCarthaig (a.k.a. Donal Gott), and others of the Uí Chairbri made a treacherous plot against Domnall Mac Carthaig, king of Desmond. Ultimately though, the plot failed, and the Uí Chairbre fled, ultimately resettling in Carbery. However, according to the Annals of Inisfallen, in 1281 "peace was made by Domnall Óc Mac Carthaig, son of Domnall Cairprech, and by Feidlimid Mac Carthaig, with Domnall Ruad Mac Carthaig, king of Desmumu, and they submitted and gave hostages to him. And he gave them their share: Desmumu south of the Laí to Domnall Óc, Eóganacht Uí Donnchada save Longphort in Ríg, and much of Muscraige and Uí Chonaill to Feidlimid. And all were at war with the foreigners, and Cell Fhorglann was burned and its castle razed; and great forays were made there, and people slain by Donnchad Mac Carthaig, Tadc Ruad Mac Carthaig, the son of Gilla Mo-Chutu Ó Súilliubáin, and by many other nobles including the Uí Muirchertaig and Uí Donnchada".

The many movements of the clans during the 13th century resulted in the relocation of many of the septs in the area, including those of the O'Mahonys, O'Driscolls. The O'Learys of ancient Rosscarbery, close kin to the O'Driscolls, retired northwards to Muskerry sometime around the year 1300.

The source of the naming of the Carberry area has been debated by many scholars, with John O'Donovan arguing it came from the migration of the O'Donovans of Uí Chairbre (and who ignored the MacCarthaig element within the Uí Chairbre), and others, including Canon John O'Mahony in his work History of the O'Mahony Septs, arguing that the name derived from much earlier (circa 300 AD) rulers, and from whom descended the O'Driscolls and the O'Mahonys and which occupied the region from the 5th or 6th century AD onwards, in Late Antiquity.

Beginning with the expansion of the MacCarthaig territory in a north east direction in 1259 as certain MacCarthaig septs recaptured a significant amount of land from the Normans, demolished a multitude of their castles, occupying others, and built a considerable string of their own fortresses, the territory of Carbery was expanded to as much as 500 square miles (1,300 km^{2}) by 1500.

According to the Annals of Tigernach, "Maelruanaidh Ó Ciardha, king of Cairbre, was killed by the men of Teffa" in AD 993. (Note: The men of Teffa, and the Munter Geraddin, and the Cairbri Hui Ciada went on a raid into Offaly (AU, 1080. FM. 1080))

== History ==
The history of Carbery for the next three centuries is almost entirely the history of the sept of the MacCarthy Reagh. Less active septs (or for which fewer events were recorded), were the O'Mahonys, the O'Driscolls, and the O'Donovans which had migrated to the Carbery area.

The O'Driscolls were a seafaring family and were Carbery's most capable pirates, for which they are noted in several sources. The O'Donovans also had some seafaring capability, and are noted for at least a little piracy as well, for which one, along with his O'Driscoll accomplices, was killed in 1551, by the O'Driscoll themselves.

== Other families ==
Leading among the remaining Gaelic families of great note in Carbery were the O'Crowleys, a military family of Connacht origin, an offshoot of the princely MacDermots of Moylurg. They were of verifiable princely extraction and in 1597 were named as the only other lords (freeholders) under the MacCarthys Reagh after the above-mentioned families. Initially brought to Carbery in a war with the Kingdom of Desmond to the north in 1283, they first found themselves in hostile territory. But later they became close vassals of the MacCarthys and were listed among the "followers, cosens and kinsmen" of the famous Florence MacCarthy in 1594. He had charged them to keep his castle of Timoleague for him while imprisoned in the Tower of London. Later they were the leading supporters of his brother Dermod Maol MacCarthy and for this were condemned to have their lands wasted in 1602 by Sir George Carew.

Carbery was also blessed to have a branch of one of Ireland's greatest bardic families of all time, the Ó Dálaigh, or O'Dalys.

The Ó Coileáin (Anglicised: O'Collins, Collins), of County Limerick origin and cousins to the O'Donovans above, are also noted in Carbery, but not as lords or great landholders, although a number were in military service. The majority of them are believed to have belonged to a junior sept of the Uí Choileáin princes of the Uí Chonaill Gabra, who had managed to hold some of their lands in western Limerick for several centuries in spite of the Normans. It is not precisely known when this junior sept arrived in Carbery but it is believed they followed the O'Donovans after both were weakened from the intrusion into the Uí-Fidghente territory of the O'Donovans and the O'Collins circa 1200. The chief of the O'Collins was killed about 1197, and that of the O'Donovans in 1200, by an alliance of the O'Brians, the MacCarthy and William DeBurgo and other Norman settlers, with both events contributing to a migration to Carbery of parts of their septs during the next century.

Michael Collins, believed his family were descendants of the Uí Chonaill Gabra. They belonged to the minor landed gentry of Carbery, and were situated in very near to O'Donovans country. Terence Kearey (Kearey Clan) believes his family were descendants of O'Ciardha a senior branch of the Cenel Cairpri.

== Princes of Carbery ==
The MacCarthy Reagh sept stems from Donal Gott MacCarthy holding the lordship of Carbery which he acquired during his tenure as King of Desmond. Donal Gott had several children. His eldest son, Dermod Don, succeeded him to the lordship upon his death in 1252. Donal Maol MacCarthy, the sixth son of Donal Gott, came into the lordship upon his brother's death in 1262. It was not until 1280 that the territory of Carbery was formally ceded to Donal Maol as an autonomous principality. As such, the family was subsequently regarded as 'Prince of Carbery.' This history is what has contributed to a confusion in the numbering of the "Princes," as some consider Donal Gott the first Prince of Carbery and others more correctly attribute Donal Maol as the first.

- Donal Gott MacCarthy, King of Desmond, Lord of Carbery
  - Fínghin Mac Carthaigh - victor at the Battle of Callann
- Dermod Don, Lord of Carbery
- Donal Maol, 1st Prince of Carbery
- Donal Reagh MacCarthy, 5th Prince of Carbery, from whom the sept assumed the agnomen "Reagh".
- Finghin MacCarthy Reagh, 10th Prince of Carbery
- Donal MacFineere MacCarthy Reagh, 12th Prince of Carbery
- Cormac na Haoine MacCarthy Reagh, 13th Prince of Carbery
- Donogh MacCarthy Reagh, 15th Prince of Carbery - father of Florence MacCarthy and Dermod Maol MacCarthy
- Owen MacCarthy Reagh, 16th Prince of Carbery
- Domhnall na bpíob Mac Cárthaigh Riabhach, 17th Prince of Carbery

== See also ==
- Donal II O'Donovan
- Sir Fineen O'Driscoll
- Teige-an-Duna MacCarthy
- Donal III O'Donovan
- Carbery's Hundred Isles
- Carbery GAA
- Earl of Carbery
- Baron Carbery
