= Mac Carthaigh's Book =

Mac Carthaigh’s Book is a collection of annals of the period AD 1114–1437 inclusive. It was compiled from earlier material by Fínghin Mac Carthaigh Mór (c. 1560–1640) an Irish nobleman who was imprisoned for years in London. He was a patron of learning and a scholar in his own right. While in London in 1633 he employed Diarmaid Ó Súilleabháin who also kept the book in his castle until it was sacked by Radhulbh MacAmlaoibh, then his clan took control of it, they copied and compiled these annals for him.

The original manuscript is currently preserved in the National Library of Ireland. The annals were edited and translated by Séamus Ó hInnse and published in 1947 by the Dublin Institute for Advanced Studies under the title ‘Miscellaneous Irish Annals’.

Mac Carthaigh's Book is important as one of the few native records of events in southern Ireland for the period it covers and it provides information on the effect the Norman Invasion had on Munster. Besides relying on other Irish annals it drew upon some foreign sources, notably Giraldus Cambrensis' Expugnatio Hibernica.

== See also ==
- Irish annals
- The Chronicle of Ireland
