= MacCarthy Reagh =

Gaelic dynasty branch

The MacCarthy Reagh (Irish: Mac Cárthaigh Riabhach) dynasty is a branch of the MacCarthy, Kings of Desmond, deriving from the Eóganacht Chaisil sept, who were the princes of Carbery.

== History ==
The Mac Cárthaigh Riabhach ruled what is now southwestern County Cork including Rosscarbery in the 13th century. Their primary allies in the initially small territory itself were O'Donovans, and members of the Ui Chairpre; both were recent arrivals, gaining their lands from the O'Mahonys of Eóganacht Raithlind and the O'Driscolls of Corcu Loígde. The historical record for this period is very confused and a precise sequence of events cannot be reconstructed. A portion of Carbery was conquered around 1232 by Donal Gott MacCarthy, King of Desmond, from whom the dynasty descend. His son Donal Maol Mac Carthaigh, was the first ruler of the new principality. Their descendants expanded their lands considerably and forged a small territory distinct and independent from the larger Kingdom of Desmond, as well as largely independent from the Earldom of Desmond and from England, which would last into the early-mid 17th century.

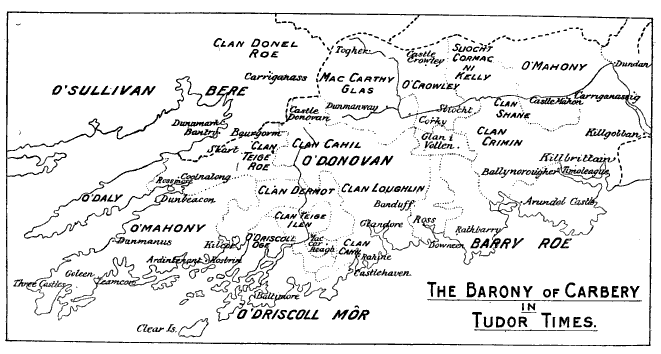
Carbery in Tudor times

Fínghin Mac Carthaigh, the victor for Gaelic Desmond in the Battle of Callann and other campaigns, is considered to belong to the Mhic Carthaigh Riabhach, being a son of Donal Gott. They were in frequent conflict with the line of the MacCarthy Mor, and the MacCarthys of Duhallow and Coshmaine, all of which were generally in conflict with the Fitzgeralds and FitzMaurices which comprised the lines of the Earl of Desmond and the Earl of Kildare, respectively.

The dynasty became very successful during the 14th to 16th centuries, accumulating great wealth and possessing what was at times the most formidable, although not the largest army in the Desmond region. MacCarthy Reagh princes such as Florence MacCarthy were highly active in the politics and wars of Munster. A later branch from Bansha, County Tipperary, descendants of Donal of the Pipes, would relocate to Toulouse in France and be recognised as Counts MacCarthy Reagh (Comtes de Mac-Carthy Reagh). The renowned Jesuit preacher Nicholas Tuite MacCarthy was from this line. From another branch of the dynasty descended several more lines of counts and viscounts in France.

Florence MacCarthy was the compiler of Mac Carthaigh's Book, and the Book of Lismore was commissioned by an earlier member of the dynasty.

The controversial Blessed Thaddeus McCarthy is believed to have belonged to the MacCarthys Reagh.

The line of the Mac Carthaigh Riabhach was not represented among the Gaelic nobility of Ireland granted courtesy recognition.

== Princes of Carbery ==
Claimants to the title of Prince of Carbery have included:

- Donal Gott MacCarthy – King of Desmond and founder of the dynasty
  - Fínghin Mac Carthaigh, King of Desmond – victor at the Battle of Callann
- Donal Maol MacCarthy, 1st Prince of Carbery – 1st Sovereign Prince of Carbery
- Donal Caomh MacCarthy, 2nd Prince of Carbery
- Donal Cairbreach MacCarthy, 3rd Prince of Carbery – eldest son of Donal Caomh
- Cormac Donn MacCarthy, 4th Prince of Carbery – second son of Donal Caomh, and ancestor of the Dunmanway branch
- Donal Reagh MacCarthy, 5th Prince of Carbery, 1st Chief of the Name MacCarthy Reagh, son of Donal Cairbreach
- Donal Glas MacCarthy Reagh, 6th Prince of Carbery – eldest son of Donal Reagh
- Donogh of Iniskean MacCarthy Reagh, 7th Prince of Carbery – second surviving son of Donal Reagh
- Dermod an Duna MacCarthy Reagh, 8th Prince of Carbery – third surviving son of Donal Reagh
- Cormac MacCarthy Reagh, 9th Prince of Carbery – son of Donogh of Iniskean
- Finghin MacCarthy Reagh, 10th Prince of Carbery – commissioner of the Book of Lismore, eldest son of Dermod an Duna
- Dermod MacCarthy Reagh, 11th Prince of Carbery – second son of Dermod an Duna
- Donal MacCarthy Reagh, 12th Prince of Carbery – Dermod's nephew, the son of Finghin
- Cormac na Haoine MacCarthy Reagh, 13th Prince of Carbery – eldest son of Donal
- Finghin MacCarthy Reagh, 14th Prince of Carbery – second son of Donal
- Donogh MacCarthy Reagh, 15th Prince of Carbery – third son of Donal
  - Florence MacCarthy, The Last MacCarthy Mór
- Owen MacCarthy Reagh, 16th Prince of Carbery – fourth son of Donal
- Donal na Pipi, 17th Prince of Carbery – son of Cormac na Haoine, last Prince of Carbery
  - Cormac MacCarthy Reagh
    - Donal MacCarthy Reagh, "Comte de Carbery" & Lord of Kilbrittain m. Lady Ellen Roche of Fermoy
      - Col. Finghin MacCarthy Reagh, "le comte de MacCarthy-Reagh" (1625–1676) m. Mary
          - Cormac
            - Owen (1691–1775)
              - Cormac m. Catherine Bernard
                - Francis Bernard MacCarthy Reagh, from whom the "Longfield MacCarthys" stem.
          - Dermot (1658–1728)
            - Donal I MacCarthy Reagh of Gorteenasowna (1690–1758) m. Katherine O'Driscoll
              - Donal II MacCarthy (1735–1814) m. Anna MacCarthy Reagh of Gortnascreeny
                - Daniel Carty of Cashloura, from whom the McCarthys of Drinagh
              - Cormac McCarty Esq. (d. 1792)
              - Owen MacCarthy
              - Margaret m. Richard O'Neill of Kilmichael, Prince of Ulster (1743–1817)
      - Cormac, Lord of Kilbrittain (d. 1667) m. Ellen McCarthy Mor
        - Daniel MacCarthy Reagh (1628–1691)
        - Catherine
        - Ellen
        - Donough
    - Owen (d. 1641)
    - Catherine
  - Owen, a quo the Springhouse sept
  - Donough, Proprietor of Kilbrittain
  - Finghin of Bandubh
  - Ellen
  - Julia
  - Teige, Chief of Kilgobane

== MacCarthy Glas/Duna ==
As patrilineal descendants of the 4th Prince, but not the 5th Prince, the MacCarthys of Dunmanway, belonging to the MacCarthy Glas and MacCarthy Duna septs, are not technically MacCarthys Reagh.

== See also ==
- Walter Butler, 11th Earl of Ormond – grandson of Cormac na Haoine, 10th Prince
- Donal II O'Donovan – relative through marriage, inaugurated by father-in-law Owen, 12th Prince
- Sir Fineen O'Driscoll – also son-in-law of Owen, 12th Prince
- De Barry family – neighbouring family of Welsh-Norman origin, but with whom the MacCarthys Reagh maintained generally good relations
- Muskerry West and Muskerry East, baronies in central Cork that were part of the Tudor period principality of Carbery.
- Francis MacCarthy Willis Bund – a descendant of Donal Reagh MacCarthy (d. 1414), The MacCarthy Reagh, of Kilbrittain Castle
- Château MacCarthy, a French wine created by the dynasty
