= Domhnall Maol Mac Cárthaigh Riabhach =

Irish noble, first sovereign Prince of Carbery

Domhnall Maol Cairprech Mac Carthaigh (anglicised Donal Maol Cairprech MacCarthy), who, as the son of Donal Gott MacCarthy, succeeded his eldest brother Dermod Donn as lord of Carbery, Ireland in 1262. However, he is regarded as the first sovereign Prince of Carbery, as he was ceded Carbery from "Misen-head to Cork" by the King of Desmond in 1280. Although there is not too much know about his life, Moddy et al. record that his death (and end of regency) was in 1310, and that he left two sons:

1. Domhnall Cam (also seen as Domhnall Caomh)
2. Cormac Fionn.
