= Domhnall Got Mac Cárthaigh =

Irish lord

Domhnall Got Mac Cárthaigh (Got = stammering, lisping; anglicised Donal Gott MacCarthy), died 1251, was the ancestor of the MacCarthy Reagh [Riabhach] dynasty of Carbery in the south of Munster in Ireland, and King of Desmond from 1247 or 1248 until the time of his death, after holding the position of tánaiste from 1230.

== Life ==
Domhnall Got Mac Cárthaigh (also called Domhnall Óg) was a younger son of Domhnall Mór na Curra, King of Desmond (r. 1185-1206), and was preceded by his elder brothers Diarmait (r. 1206-1230) and Cormac Fionn (r. 1230-1247).

In 1232 Mac Cárthaigh was taken prisoner by his brother Cormac. Upon his release a few months later, he slew three sons of Muirchertach Ó Mathghamhna, plundering his land, and seizing the territory between Kinelmeky and Ivagha, thus divided the O'Mahony septlands into two disconnected areas. Diarmait Ó Mathghamhna remained lord in Ivagha, and his brother Conchobar, lord in Kinelmeaky. According to the Annals of Innisfallen, Domhnall "remained in the South". There on the southwestern coast of Munster he established the small, semi-independent kingdom of Carbery and acquired the additional sobriquet of Domhnall Cairbreach.

== Children ==
Domhnall Got left six sons:

1. Dermod Don [Diarmait Donn] (a quo, Clan Dermod), lord of Carbery,
2. Teige [Tadgh] Dall (ie: the Blind) (a quo, Clan Teige Dall),
3. Cormac "na-Mangartan",
4. Finghin Mac Cárthaigh (d. 1261), victor at the Battle of Callann,
5. The Aithchléirach, [Dineen: ex-cleric, renegade priest], who is yet unnamed, but was a druid,
6. Domhnall Maol, first Prince of Carbery.

== DNA testing ==
A 2017 study, the McCarthy Y-DNA Surname Study, involved research into the genetic origins and evolution of the MacCarthy septs. The study proposes that Domhnall Got possessed the unique single nucleotide polymorphism (SNP), ZS4598. Thus, while many participants of the study have been shown to descend from Domhnall Got, some belong to different branches, including those postulated to be Clann Tadhg Dall, MacCarthy Reagh and Sliochd Feidhlimidh. The MacCarthy Reagh contingent include the subsepts of Farshing [Fairsing], Rabagh [Rábach], Tallin (a.k.a. Tollin) and Tullach.
