= List of monarchs of Desmond =

The following is a list of monarchs of the Kingdom of Desmond. Most were of the MacCarthy Mór ("great MacCarthy"), the senior branch of the MacCarthy dynasty.

== 12th century ==
=== MacCarthy ===
Name	Parents	From	Until	Relationship with predecessor
Tadhg Mac Carthaigh	son of Muireadach Mac Carthaigh	1118	1123	son of Muiredach mac Carthach, representing the Eóganacht Chaisil

=== MacCarthy claimants ===
Name	Parents	From	Until	Relationship with predecessor
Cormac Mac Carthaigh	son of Muireadach Mac Carthaigh	1123	1127	brother of Tadhg Mac Carthaigh
Donogh Mac Carthaigh	son of Muireadach MacCarthaigh	1127	1127	brother of Cormac MacCarthy
Cormac Mac Carthaigh (restored)	son of Muireadach MacCarthaigh	1127	1138	brother of Donogh Mac Carthaigh
Donogh Mac Carthaigh (restored)	son of Muireadach Mac Carthaigh	1138	1143	brother of Cormac Mac Carthaigh
Dermot Mór na Cill Baghain Mac Carthaigh	son of Cormac Mac Carthaigh	1143	1185	nephew of Donogh Mac Carthaigh

=== O'Brien claimants ===
Name	Parents	From	Until	Relationship with predecessor
Tadhg Gláe macDiarmata O'Brien	son of Diarmait mac Toirrdelbaig O'Brien	1122	1154	son of Diarmait mac Toirrdelbaig O'Brien, claimant to the Kingdom of Munster
Muirchertach mac Toirrdelbaig O'Brien	son of Toirrdelbach mac Diarmata O'Brien	1167	1168	cousin of Tadhg Gláe mac Diarmata O'Brien

=== MacCarthy ===
Name	Parents	From	Until	Relationship with predecessor
Donal Mór na Corra Mac Carthaigh	son of Dermod Mór MacCarthy	1185	1206	son of Dermod Mór Mac Carthaigh

== 13th century ==
Name	Parents	From	Until	Relationship with predecessor
Fingen Mac Carthaigh	son of Dermod Mór Mac Carthaigh	1206	1207	brother of Donal Mór Mac Carthaigh
Diarmait Duna Droignein Mac Carthaigh	son of Donal Mór na Corra Mac Carthaigh	1207	1229	nephew of Fingen Mac Carthaigh
Cormac Fionn Mac Carthaigh	son of Donal Mór na Corra Mac Carthaigh	1229	1247	brother of Diarmait Duna Droignein Mac Carthaigh
Domnall Got Mac Carthaig	son of Donal Mór na Corra Mac Carthaigh	1247	1251	brother of Cormac Fionn Mac Carthaigh
Finghin MacCarthy	son of Domnall Got Cairprech Mac Carthaigh	1251	1261	son of Domnall Got Cairprech Mac Carthaigh
Cormac Mac Carthaig	son of Domnall Got Cairprech Mac Carthaigh	1261	1262	brother of Fingen Mac Carthaigh
Domnall Ruad Mac Carthaigh	son of Cormac Fionn Mac Carthaigh	1262	1302	cousin of Cormac Mac Carthaigh

== 14th century ==
Name	Parents	From	Until	Relationship with predecessor
Donal Oge Mac Carthaigh	son of Domnall Ruad Mac Carthaigh	1302	1306	son of Domnall Ruad Mac Carthaigh
Donogh Carrthain Mac Carthaigh	son of Cormac Fionn Mac Carthaigh	1306	1310	uncle of Donal Oge Mac Carthaigh
Diarmait Oge Mac Carthaigh	son of Donogh Carrthain Mac Carthaigh	1310	1326	son of Donogh Carrthain Mac Carthaigh
Cormac Mac Carthaigh	son of Donogh Carrthain Mac Carthaigh	1326	1359	brother of Diarmait Oge Mac Carthaigh
Donal Oge Mac Carthaigh	son of Cormac Mac Carthaigh	1359	1390	son of Cormac Mac Carthaig
Tadhg na Mainistreach Mac Carthaigh Mór	son of Donal Oge Mac Carthaigh	1390	1428	son of Donal Oge Mac Carthaigh

== 15th century ==
Name	Parents	From	Until	Relationship with predecessor
Domhnall an Dana Mac Carthaigh	son of Tadhg na Mainstreach Mac Carthaigh hMór	1428	1469	son of Tadhg na Mainstreach Mac Carthaigh Mór
Tadhg Liath Mac Carthaigh	son of Domhnall an Dana Mac Carthaigh Mór	1469	1503	son of Domhnall an Dana Mac Carthaigh

== 16th century ==
Name	Parents	From	Until	Relationship with predecessor
Domnall Mac Carthaigh	son of Tadhg Liath Mac Carthaigh	1503	1508	son of Tadhg Liath Mac Carthaigh

=== Claim I ===
Name	Parents	From	Until	Relationship with predecessor
Cormac Ladhrach Mac Carthaigh	son of Tadhg Liath Mac Carthaigh	1508	1516	brother of Domnall Mac Carthaigh

=== Claim II ===
Name	Parents	From	Until	Relationship with predecessor
Tadhg na Leamhna Mac Carthaigh	son of Domnall Mac Carthaigh	1508	1514	son of Domnall Mac Carthaigh, nephew of Cormac Ladhrach Mac Carthaigh who he disputed the throne with

=== Final ===
Name	Parents	From	Until	Relationship with predecessor
Domhnall an Druiminin Mac Carthaigh	son of Cormac Ladhrach Mac Carthaigh	1516	1558	son of Cormac Ladhrach Mac Carthaig
Domhnall Mac Carthaigh	son of Domhnall an Druiminin Mac Carthaigh	1558	1596	son of Domhnall an Druiminin Mac Carthaigh

== Later MacCarthy Mór chiefs ==
The title Chief of the Name MacCarthy Mór, heir of the historical chief, was claimed by Terence Francis MacCarthy and recognised in 1992 by the Chief Herald of Ireland. In 1999 recognition was withdrawn after it emerged that evidence for the claim had been fabricated.

In June 2009, Liam Trant MacCarthy (born 27 December 1957) of Southern Rhodesia received recognition from Garter Principal King of Arms at the College of Arms in London as the senior descendant and claimant to the title MacCarthy Mór. He is the son of Cormac Trant McCarthy (1931–1999), the son of William, otherwise Liam, Trant McCarthy, Solicitor (1894–1967), the son of William Patrick Trant McCarthy (1853–1901), the son of Daniel McCarthy of Srugrena and his wife Ellen, the daughter of Patrick Trant of Waterford. The top two generations of this pedigree appear on a pedigree in the former Ulster Office of Arms. The family pedigree was also published in Burke's Irish Landed Gentry under the heading MacCarthy of Srugrena Abbey Co. Kerry.

== See also ==
- Earl of Clancarty
- Earl of Desmond
- Eóganachta
- FitzGerald dynasty
- Kings of Munster
- MacCarthy of Muskerry
- MacCarthy Reagh
