= Florence MacCarthy =

Irish prince

Finnin MacCarthy (Irish: Fínghin mac Donncha Mac Carthaig) (1560–1640), was an Irish clan chief and member of the Gaelic nobility of Ireland (Irish: flaith) of the late 16th-century and the last credible claimant to the Mac Carthaig Mór title before its suppression by English authority. Mac Carthaig's involvement in the Nine Years' War (1595–1603) led to his arrest by the Crown, and he spent the last 40 years of his life in custody in London. His clan's lands were divided among his relatives and Anglo-Irish colonialists.

== Early life ==
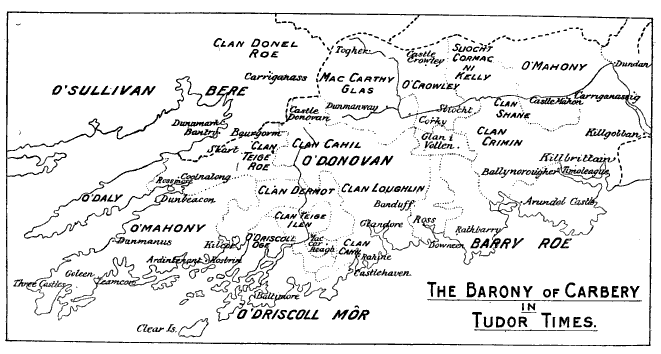
Carbery in Tudor times

Mac Carthaig was born in 1560 at Kilbrittain Castle near Kinsale in the province of Munster in Ireland, into the MacCarthy Reagh dynasty, rulers of Carbery, the son of Donogh MacCarthy Reagh, 15th Prince of Carbery. His grandfather was Donal MacCarthy Reagh, 12th Prince of Carbery.

The significance of Mac Carthaig's career lies in his command of territories in west Munster, at a time when the Tudor conquest of Ireland was underway. Southwest Munster was the area most open to Spanish intervention, which had been mooted from the late 1570s to aid Catholic rebellions in Ireland. The overlord of much of this area, but excluding Carbery, was the MacCarthy Mór of Desmond, whose lands were located in modern west Cork and Kerry. There were, in addition, three more princely branches of the MacCarthy dynasty, the MacCarthys of Muskerry, the MacCarthys of Duhallow, and finally the most wealthy: the MacCarthy Reagh of independent Carbery, of whom Florence's father had been a (semi-)sovereign prince. It was into a complex interplay between the crown government and these opposing branches that Florence found himself pitched.

The Mac Carthaig Reagh branch established itself as loyal to the crown during the Desmond Rebellions (1569–73 and 1579–83), to assert their independence from their nominal overlords, the Earl of Desmond and the Mac Carthaig Mór, both of whom had joined the rebellion. Mac Carthaig's father, Donnchadh Mac Carthaig Reagh, served the crown faithfully and reported that he had mobilised his men to drive the rebel Gerald FitzGerald, 15th Earl of Desmond out of his territory during the Second Desmond Rebellion. When his father died in 1581, Mac Carthaig, by then in his late teens or early twenties, led around 300 men in the English service with the assistance of an English captain, William Stanley, and his lieutenant, Jacques de Franceschi, under the overall command of the Earl of Ormonde. They drove Desmond's remaining followers out of MacCarthy territory, 'into his own waste country', where the rebel earls' troops could find no provisions and deserted. Mac Carthaig also claimed credit for the killings of Gorey MacSweeney and Morrice Roe, two of Desmond's gallowglass captains.

Upon his father's death in 1581, Mac Carthaig inherited substantial property but was not the prince's tanist (second in command and usually successor to the head), and therefore did not assume his father's title, which went to Mac Carthaig's uncle, Owen MacCarthy Reagh, 16th Prince of Carbery. The position of tanist went to Mac Carthaig's cousin, Donal na Pipi (Donal of the Pipes). But, in 1583, Mac Carthaig did go to court, where he was received by the queen, who granted him 1000 marks and an annuity of 100 marks. In 1585 he served as a member of the Irish Parliament at Dublin.

== The Tower ==
Upon his marriage to Ellen, the daughter and sole heir of the Mac Carthaig Mór (also Earl of Clancare), Fínghin mac Donncha fell foul of the crown government in Munster on account of the prospective unification of the two main branches of the Clan Carthy. To add to government suspicion, there was also a rumour of communications by him with Spain. In particular, he was accused of contact with William Stanley and Jacques de Franceschi, who had defected with a regiment of Irish soldiers from the English to the Spanish side in the Eighty Years' War in Flanders.

As a result of these suspicions, Mac Carthaig was arrested in 1588 as a precaution against his assumption of the title of Mac Carthaig Mór, which would have given him command over huge estates and thousands of followers. The English authorities considered this too dangerous a prospect in a country they were trying to pacify and disarm.

Initially detained by Carew at Shandon Castle in Cork, after six months Mac Carthaig was moved to Dublin, and then to London, where he arrived in February 1589 to be committed to the Tower. His wife escaped from Cork a few days later, probably on his instructions. Mac Carthaig was examined by the privy council in March and denied all complicity in the continental intrigues of the English Catholic, Sir William Stanley. He was sent back to the Tower, but fifteen months later his wife appeared at court and Sir Thomas Butler, 10th Earl of Ormonde, volunteered to stand surety for him in the sum of £1000. Since no charges were proved against him, Mac Carthaig was set at liberty in January 1591 on condition that he not leave England nor travel more than three miles outside London without permission.

The Queen's principal secretary, Lord Burghley, backed him, and he obtained protection against his creditors and permission to recover an old fine of £500 due to the Crown from Lord Barry, a neighbour and rival of his in Munster, whom he blamed for his arrest; Barry was later to accuse him of disloyalty as this suit was prosecuted. Mac Carthaig subsequently obtained permission to return to Ireland.

== Succession disputes ==
Fínghin mac Donncha returned to Ireland (though he was still technically a prisoner) in November 1593, following his wife and child. In the next year, his uncle Owen (the Mac Carthaig Reagh) died and was succeeded by his nephew, Donal na Pípí. The latter bound himself in the sum of £10,000 not to divert the Mac Carthaig Reagh succession from MacCarthy, who was in turn his tanist. Mac Carthaig appeared before the council at Dublin in June 1594 to reply to the accusations of David de Barry, 5th Viscount Buttevant, a local rival of Mac Carthaig's with whom he had a land dispute, which again implicated him pro-Spanish intrigues with William Stanley. Florence then returned to England by licence and remained there until the spring of 1596 in a vain attempt to prosecute Lord Buttevant. The execution of Patrick O'Collun, a fencing master, for conspiracy to murder the Queen in 1594 did nothing to restore Mac Carthaig's reputation since O'Collun had once been a member of his household.

In 1596, Donal Mac Carthaig, Mac Carthaig Mór and Earl of Clancarthy, died without male issue and the matter of the succession became highly complicated. Clancar's estate should by law have reverted to the crown, but Mac Carthaig had a mortgage on the lands and also had right by his wife. Another Donal, the Earl's illegitimate son (not to be confused with Donal na Pipi), also asserted a claim, not to the English Earldom, but to the title of Mac Carthaig Mór. Fínghin mac Donncha Mac Carthaig would in future correspondence refer to Donal as "Donal the bastard".

It was most unlikely that the English authorities would acknowledge Mac Carthaig or grant him the derived English title as they wanted to break up the Mac Carthaig lands; so the real dispute in law came down to the recovery of lands by Florence from an English mortgagee (William Brown), who had possessed them on account of a debt owed to him by the earl. In June 1598, Mac Carthaig travelled to England to pursue the matter.

However, the situation was transformed by the arrival in Munster of the Ulster forces of Hugh O'Neill, who was leading a nationwide rebellion – the Nine Years' War – against the English government in Ireland. In the autumn, Donal Mac Carthaig (the late Earl's illegitimate son) was reported to have acknowledged the authority of the rebel O'Neill and assumed the title of Mac Carthaig Mór, but the O'Sullivan Mór withheld the White Wand or rod of inauguration (which symbolically approved the accession) in favour of Fínghin mac Donncha Mac Carthaig. In a desperate situation, when it seemed that all the native lords in Munster were going into rebellion, the crown granted Mac Carthaig a free pardon, on terms that he immediately withdraw his followers from rebellion in return for qualified acknowledgement of his title against Donal Mac Carthaig, but he prevaricated and only returned to Munster after Sir Robert Devereux, 3rd Earl of Essex – whose favour he had been relying upon – threw up his command as lord lieutenant in Ireland in late 1599 and returned to England under a cloud. Mac Carthaig had managed to negotiate English support for his claims to land and title, but he also maintained contact with the rebels to the same end. This has made some commentators claim that his real sympathy lay with the rebels, especially as he was described in his youth as being "very zealous in the old religion [Catholicism]". However, it is more likely Fínghin mac Donncha was using both sides as a lever to further his own aims.

== War in Munster ==
During the Nine Years' War in Munster, Mac Carthaig failed to engage with the English military campaign and secretly negotiated with the rebels under Hugh O'Neill and the Spanish. O'Neill's strategy was to back those local Irish lords who had a grievance against English authority and were in command of sufficient land and followers to contribute to his war effort.

In 1599, Mac Carthaig visited Fitzthomas, the rebel "Súgan" Earl of Desmond, in Carbery, where he claimed to have spoken in the queen's favour; it is more likely that Mac Carthaig promised his support for the rebels on condition that O'Neill acknowledge him as Mac Carthaig Mor. In the following days, Fitzthomas, followed reluctantly by Donal Mac Carthaig, laid waste to Lord Barry's territory of Ibawne, on the ground that Barry had refused to join the rebellion. From his base at Kinsale, Fínghin mac Donncha closed all the approaches into his own country.

In 1600 O'Neill's army arrived in Munster and pitched camp between the rivers Lee and Bandon, whereupon MacCarthy came into the camp for an interview and was installed there as Mac Carthaig Mór at the expense of his rival, Donal Mac Carthaig. To the English, it now appeared that Mac Carthaig had sided conclusively with O'Neill, and military action was taken against him. In fact, Florence may simply have been playing both sides to become the Mac Carthaig Mor. In April an English expedition led by Captain George Flower raided his lands in Carbery and fought a bloody skirmish with Mac Carthaig's levies, which left over 200 men dead between the two sides.

In the same month, Sir George Carew was appointed governor of Munster, with sufficient men and resources to pacify the province. Carew summoned Mac Carthaig to Cork for an explanation of his conduct; at first, Mac Carthaig refused to come in without guarantees for his life and liberty, and when he did come in he refused to give his son as hostage. Carew urged him to support the English campaign, but Mac Carthaig promised no more than his neutrality, arguing that he was loyal, but that if he were to side openly with the English his own followers would desert him (a common plea of Gaelic leaders).

In fact, at this time Mac Carthaig, in an intercepted letter to Hugh Roe O'Donnell, had sought to assure the northern rebels of his commitment to their cause. He was also the main contact in the south of Ireland for the Spanish, who planned a landing in Munster, which Mac Carthaig most likely expected would settle the war for good. On 5 January 1600, he wrote to Philip II of Spain, via his agent in Ulster, Donagh mac Cormac Mac Carthaig, offering,

his person and lands as well as his vassals and subjects to your Royal service…to receive favour and aid…seeing as there is no other that can and will assist us better against these Heretics in this holy enterprise.

In the months that followed, Carew broke the rebellion in Munster, retaking rebel castles, arresting Fitzthomas, the Súgan Earl, and persuading Donal MacCarthy to change sides. Carew viewed this as highly significant, because Donal Mac Carthaig was not only a credible rival, but also knew the remote and mountainous terrain in which Fínghin mac Donncha was based. Having pacified the province, Carew had no intention of leaving Fínghin mac Donncha installed as MacCarthy Mór, judging that his supremacy would make any future English presence in the area impossible. To this end, he arrested Florence, having called him to his camp for talks, 14 days before the expiry of the safe conduct "on discretion" (i.e. without charge) – an action which, although unlawful, was approved by the Queen's secretary, Robert Cecil, for reasons of state.

The Irish Annals of the Four Masters states:

Fineen [Florence], son of Donough Mac Carthaig(who was at this time called Mac Carthaig Mór), went before the President at Cork; but as soon as he had arrived in the town he was made a prisoner for the Queen; but Fínghin mac Donncha began to declare aloud, and without reserve, that he had been taken against the word and protection. This was of no avail to him; for he [was] sent to England in the month of August, and Fitzthomas [the rebel Earl of Desmond]... shewn the Tower as their house of eating and sleeping from that forward to the time of their deaths, or end of their lives, according to the will of God and of their Sovereign.

Mac Carthaigm was sent to England in August 1601 and committed to the Tower. Carew also arrested Mac Carthaig's son, as well as his kinsmen, Dermot mac Owen and Taig mac Cormac, and his follower, O'Mahon. Only a month later, the Spanish had sent an armada to Ireland led by Don Juan del Águila and had landed on the South Western coast of Ireland including Kinsale. They inquired immediately for Mac Carthaig, their main local contact. His absence was no doubt a serious disadvantage in organising local support. Most of the Mhic Carthaig, including both Donal and Donal na Pipi, did go over to the Spanish side, but surrendered after the English victory over the Irish and Spanish at the Battle of Kinsale in 1601.

== In custody in London ==
Mac Carthaig vainly petitioned for release from prison with a promise to serve against O'Neill. After the English victory at the battle of Kinsale, his brother, Diarmuid Maol ("Bald Dermot"), who commanded Fínghin mac Donncha's followers in his absence, was killed accidentally in a cattle-raid by some of Donal II O'Donovan's men under the command of Fínghin Mac Carthaig, his first cousin, son of his uncle Owen; many of his kinsmen were also killed in various encounters with English or rival Irish forces. In 1604 he was transferred to the Marshalsea for his health, but sent back to the Tower, with the privilege of access to his books.

In 1606, Donal na Pípí surrendered his claim to the Mac Carthaig lordship and received a grant of the territory of Carbery. Then Sir Richard Boyle, Earl of Cork, and Lord Barry tried to wrest from Mac Carthaig the territory inherited from his father, but he successfully resisted by means of the law. However, much of his former lands were re-distributed. He went to the Marshalsea again in 1608, was released in 1614 on bonds of £5000 not to leave London, and in 1617 was recommitted to the Tower on the information of his servant, Teige O'Hurley, alleging his involvement with William Stanley and several exiled Irish Catholic priests and nobles, including Hugh Maguire. Mac Carthaig was due for release in 1619 but was sent back to the Gatehouse in 1624, to "a little narrow close room without sight of the air", owing to the death of two of his sureties, Donogh O'Brien, 4th Earl of Thomond and Sir Patrick Barnewall. He was freed in 1626 on fresh sureties and won his protracted suit for the barony of Molahiffe in 1630 (although the lands were still in the possession of the English mortgagees in 1637).

MacCarthy lived the remainder of his life in London, where he wrote a history of Ireland, Mac Carthaigh's Book, based on Old Irish texts. He wrote that, "although they [the Irish] are thought by many fitter to be rooted out than suffered to enjoy their lands, they are not so rebellious or dangerous as they are termed by such as covet it". He died in 1640.

== Legacy ==
Mac Carthaig had a troubled relationship with his wife, who grew jealous of his inheritance and who informed on him to the English authorities. She also seems to have disapproved of his political choices, reportedly saying that she, "would not go begging in Ulster or Spain". In 1607 he reported that he had, "sent away that wicked woman that was my wife…whom I saw not nor could abide in almost a year before my commitment [imprisonment]". Nevertheless, he did have four children by her who are known: Teige (died as a boy in the Tower), Donal (who converted to Protestantism and married Sarah daughter of the MacDonnell Earl of Antrim), Florence (married Mary daughter of Donal III O'Donovan), and Cormac (Charles).

In time, the title of Mac Carthaig Mór was subdued and the personal lands of Fínghin mac Donncha Mac Carthaig were distributed to English settlers, among them Richard Boyle, 1st Earl of Cork. The MacCarthy lords, including Donal na Pipi of Carberry, Donal MacCarthy (son of the earl) and Dermot MacCarthy of Muskerry were granted title to their lands, but had to surrender up to a third of their inheritance to the crown. Donagh MacCarthy, the son of Dermot Mac Carthaig, later created Viscount of Muskerry, would later be one of the leaders of the Irish Rebellion of 1641 and Confederate Ireland in the 1640s.

A rough portrait of Mac Carthaig was taken to France in 1776 by a collateral kinsman, Justin Mac Carthaig (1744–1811) of Springhouse, Bansha, County Tipperary, who was a direct descendant of Dónal na Pípí and was going into exile because of the harsh treatment in Ireland of Catholics under the Penal Laws. The portrait was kept in the mansion at 3, Rue Mage in the city of Toulouse where he resided as Count MacCarthy-Reagh. The Count was noted for his rich library which in importance was second only to the King's in Paris.

An anonymous writer in 1686 wrote of Fínghin mac Donncha Mac Carthaig, drawing on a contemporary description in Pacata Hibernia, 'Of all the MacCarthys, none was ever more famous than…Florence, who was a man of extraordinary stature (being like Saul higher by the head and shoulders than any of his followers) and as great policy with competent courage and as much zeal as anybody for what he falsely imagined to be the true religion, and the liberty of his country. However, his rival Donal "the bastard" MacCarthy described him as "a damned counterfeit Englishman whose study and practice was to deceive and betray all the Irishmen in Ireland".

== See also ==
- Irish nobility
- Eóganachta
- Tudor conquest of Ireland
- Nine Years' War (Ireland)
- Mac Carthaigh's Book
