= Thomas FitzGerald, 7th Earl of Desmond =

Lord Deputy of Ireland (died 1467)

Thomas FitzGerald
- Earl of Desmond
- Tenure: 1462/3–1467/8
- Predecessor: James FitzGerald
- Successor: James FitzThomas FitzGerald
- Died: 15 February 1467/8; Drogheda
- Cause of death: beheading
- Buried: Christ Church, Dublin
- Wars and battles: Battle of Piltown
- Spouse: Ellice de Barry
- Issue: James FitzThomas FitzGerald; Maurice FitzThomas FitzGerald; Thomas FitzThomas FitzGerald; John FitzGerald; Gerald FitzThomas FitzGerald; Lady Katherine FitzGerald; Lady Ellen FitzGerald
- Parents: James FitzGerald; Mary de Burgh

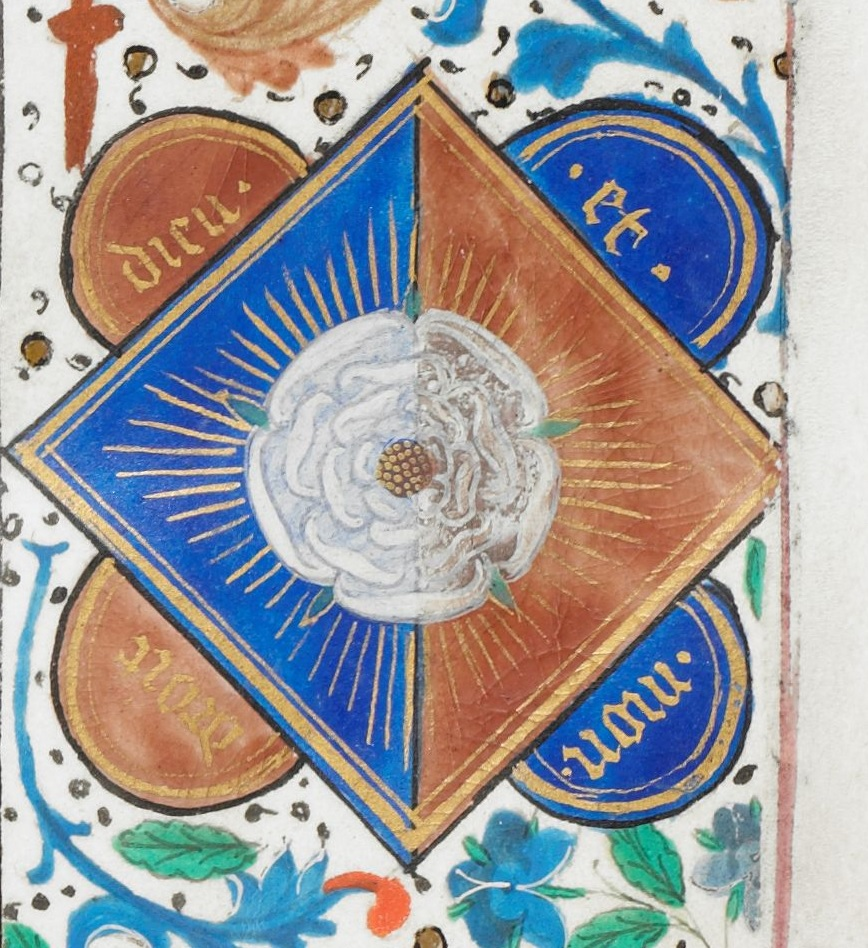
White Rose of York, from a manuscript of Edward IV of England

Thomas FitzJames FitzGerald, 7th Earl of Desmond (died 1467/68), called 'Thomas of Drogheda', not to be confused with his cousin, Thomas FitzGerald (1421-1477) Lord Justice of Ireland also known as the Great Earl. Thomas FitzJames FitzGerald was the son of James FitzGerald, 6th Earl of Desmond and Mary de Burgh.

Desmond was Lord Deputy of Ireland under the Lieutenancy of the Duke of Clarence from 1463 to his death, and in 1464 founded the College of Youghal. His plan to found a University at Drogheda failed due to his judicial assassination.

== Political career ==
Upon the death of his father, James FitzGerald, 6th Earl of Desmond, in 1462, Thomas FitzJames FitzGerald became the 7th Earl of Desmond. That same year Desmond, having sided, as had his father, with the House of York, put down a Lancastrian invasion of Ireland by John and Thomas Butler, brothers of the Earl of Ormond. Local memory claims that the Battle of Piltown was so violent that the local river ran red with blood, hence the names Pill River and Piltown (Baile an Phuill – Town of the blood). Piltown was the only battle of the Wars of the Roses fought in Ireland.

In appreciation, the following year King Edward IV appointed Desmond Lord-Deputy under the King's brother, George Plantagenet, 1st Duke of Clarence. Desmond built castles around the Pale and continued the hereditary FitzGerald feud with the Butlers. In 1464 he founded the collegiate church at Youghal.

== Downfall and death ==
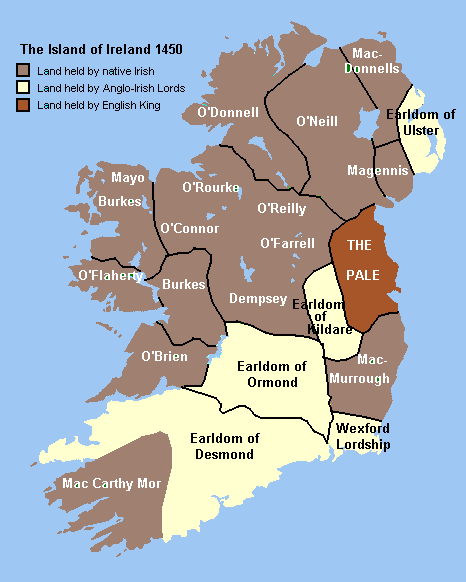
Ireland c. 1450, showing the Yorkist earldom of Desmond and its Lancastrian rival earldom of Ormond

In 1466 Desmond was badly defeated in an expedition to Offaly, which permanently weakened the defence of the Pale. He was well-liked in Ireland for his defence of them against the difficulties of English law. The parliament in the Dublin Pale had a negative view of the Gaels, descendants of the original inhabitants, and passed an act in 1465 that every Irishman dwelling in the Pale was to dress and shave like the English and take an English surname such as the name of a town, or of a colour such as Black, Brown, Green or White, or of a trade such as Smith, Carpenter, Thatcher, or forfeit his goods. Another measure forbade ships from fishing in the seas off Ireland because the dues went to make the Irish people prosperous. Another provided that it was lawful to decapitate 'thieves' found robbing "or going or coming anywhere" unless they had an Englishman in their company. On bringing the head to the mayor of the nearest town, 'head money' was paid.

Desmond was the main defender of the Irish against such exactions. Following his assassination, in 1468 Edward IV replaced Desmond as Lord Deputy with John Tiptoft, 1st Earl of Worcester, a Crown servant notorious for his cruelty and ruthlessness, who was nicknamed "the Butcher of England".

Accused by his political enemies of treason, for aiding the Irish against the King's subjects, as well as extortion, Desmond attended a Parliament held in Drogheda. Along with his cousin, Thomas FitzGerald, 7th Earl of Kildare, he was attainted for treason on 4 February 1468, convicted in a show trial, and beheaded on 15 February. The fact that Desmond had been seized in a priory, in breach of the right of sanctuary, caused particular indignation. Although Desmond was beheaded, Kildare managed to escape to England to plead his case before the King. Desmond was buried at St. Peter's Church, Drogheda, then afterwards his remains were removed to Christ Church Cathedral, Dublin.

Desmond's death shocked the nation: "slain by the swords of the wicked, or may I say a martyr" wrote one chronicler. Some accounts claim that Tiptoft also murdered two of Desmond's young sons, who were attending school in Drogheda. The Munster Geraldines invaded the Pale. Not wishing to see a similar uprising in Leinster, Edward revoked the attainder against both Kildare and Desmond. Although Desmond's heir was allowed to succeed to his father's lands and title, relations between the Crown and the Desmonds were strained for decades.

The precise cause of his downfall remains something of a mystery. There were vague rumours that he was involved in a plot against Tiptoft, who was certainly not a man to give his enemies the benefit of the doubt, and even vaguer rumours that Desmond might be planning to become King of Ireland. Apart from Tiptoft, he had another powerful enemy in William Sherwood, Bishop of Meath, a man as ruthless as Tiptoft himself, who was believed by many to have poisoned Tiptoft's mind against Desmond. Later accounts suggested that Edward IV's Queen, Elizabeth Woodville, was the prime mover, having taken offence at some tactless remarks of Desmond, which drew attention to her obscure birth, a subject on which she was understandably sensitive, as her husband had been ridiculed for marrying one who was "not the daughter of a Duke or Earl". The Queen was undoubtedly a formidable enemy: her husband's biographer describes her as a woman who was cold and calculating by nature, "quick to take offence and reluctant to forgive" but there is no contemporary evidence of any quarrel between her and Desmond. One account claims that the Queen was jealous of Desmond's influence over her husband.

== Reputation ==
Desmond has been praised by modern historians as a versatile and attractive figure. He was handsome, affable, hospitable and learned: "a Renaissance magnate with an Irish tinge".

== Marriage and issue ==
On 22 August 1455, Thomas married Ellice de Barry, daughter of William Barry, 8th Baron Barry, and Ellen de la Roche, and they had seven sons and two daughters:

1. James FitzGerald, 8th Earl of Desmond.
2. Maurice FitzGerald, 9th Earl of Desmond.
3. Lady Katherine Fitzgerald, married Finghin MacCarthy Reagh, 8th Prince of Carbery
4. Thomas Fitzgerald, 11th Earl of Desmond.
5. Unnamed boy #1, who was murdered by John Tiptoft, 1st Earl of Worcester.
6. Unnamed boy #2, who was murdered by John Tiptoft, 1st Earl of Worcester.
7. John FitzGerald, de facto 12th Earl of Desmond.
8. Ellen Fitzgerald, married 1) Thomas Butler of Caher, 2) Turlogh Mac I Brien Ara, of Duharra, Bishop of Killaloe.
9. Gerald Oge Fitzgerald of Macollop, c.1464 whose male descendants became extinct in 1743.

== Ancestry ==
Ancestors of Thomas FitzGerald, 7th Earl of Desmond

Thomas FitzGerald, 2nd Baron Desmond
Maurice FitzGerald, 1st Earl of Desmond
Margaret de Barry
Gerald FitzGerald, 3rd Earl of Desmond
Nicholas FitzMaurice, 2nd Baron of Kerry and Lixnaw
Aveline fitz Nicholas
Slany O'Brien
James FitzGerald, 6th Earl of Desmond
James Butler, 1st Earl of Ormond
James Butler, 2nd Earl of Ormond
Eleanor de Bohun, Countess of Ormonde
Eleanor Butler
John Darcy, 1st Baron Darcy de Knayth, Justiciar of Ireland
Elizabeth Darcy
Joan de Burgh
Thomas FitzGerald, 7th Earl of Desmond
William de Burgh
Mary de Burgh

== Notes ==
Peerage of Ireland
Preceded by James FitzGerald	Earl of Desmond; 1st creation 1462–1468	Succeeded by James FitzThomas FitzGerald
