= Finghin MacCarthy Reagh =

Prince of Carbery

Finghin MacCarthy Reagh (Irish: Fínghin Mac Carthaigh Riabhach) was the 10th Prince of Carbery from 1478 to his death in 1505. He belonged to the MacCarthy Reagh dynasty, and was the eldest son of Dermod an Duna MacCarthy Reagh, 8th Prince of Carbery. He was born in 1425 or 1430.

== Life ==
He was held in high regard by Henry VII of England, who in 1484 "authorized" (encouraged) him, along with his kinsman Cormac MacTeige, Lord of Muskerry, to receive the homage of the various Irish lords and chiefs of the region.

It was for Finghin and his wife Katherine that the famous Book of Lismore was compiled.

== Marriage and issue ==
Finghin married Katherine, daughter of Thomas FitzGerald, 7th Earl of Desmond, and they had issue:

1. Donal MacFineere MacCarthy Reagh, 12th Prince of Carbery
2. Donogh
3. Dermod
4. Ilin, married James de Barry, Lord Ibane

with the possible addition of another son, Cormac.

Regnal titles
Preceded by Dermod an Duna	Prince of Carbery; 1477–1505	Succeeded by Donal MacCarthy Reagh
