= Barleycove =

Beach and conservation area in Ireland

Barley Cove
- Barleycove
- Bá na hEornan (Irish)
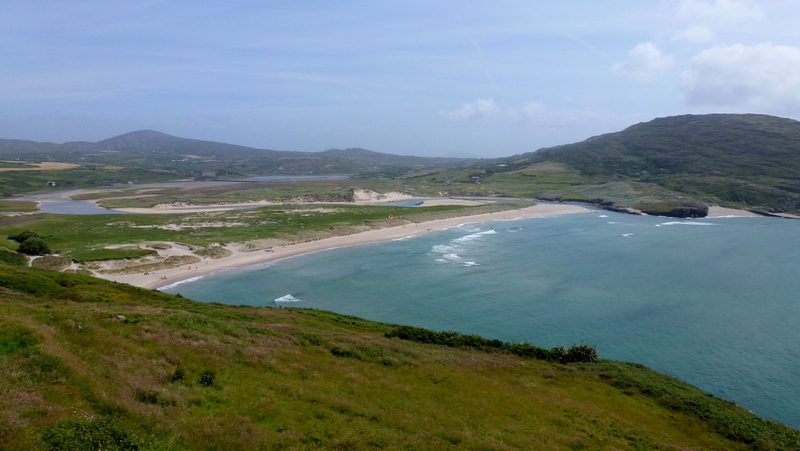
- The beach at Barley Cove, within the Barley Cove to Ballyrisode Point SAC, lies between two hills and has extensive sand dunes

- Location within island of Ireland
- Location: County Cork, Ireland
- Coordinates: 51.47°N 9.77°W
- Type: Bay
- Part of: Barley Cove to Ballyrisode Point SAC
- Ocean/sea sources: Atlantic Ocean
- Managing agency: National Parks and Wildlife Service

Natura 2000 site (SAC)
- Official name: Barley Cove to Ballyrisode Point SAC
- Designated: 2018
- Reference no.: 001040

Barleycove or Barley Cove (Irish: Bá na hEornan, meaning 'bay of the barley') is a bay and beach in County Cork, on the south coast of Ireland. It is situated close to Mizen Head on the Mizen Peninsula, with Crookhaven or Goleen being the nearest villages. The beach is part of an area designated as one of several Special Areas of Conservation in Ireland (or SACs) under the European Union's Habitats Directive, due to the variety of wildlife and habitats in the sand dunes.

== History ==
Barley Cove beach lies within Mallavoge townland. Evidence of ancient settlement in Mallavoge townland includes a number of ringfort and promontory fort sites at Brow Head.

The dunes at Barley Cove originate from large waves, triggered on 1 November 1755, by an earthquake and tsunami in Lisbon, Portugal. It was reported in the Cork Journal of 2 November 1755 that 15 ft waves were experienced as a result of this event. A side-effect of the tsunami is Barley Cove's dune system, as much of the beach's sand was deposited by these large waves.

== Conservation area ==
The area between Barley Cove and Ballyrisode Point (the Barley Cove to Ballyrisode Point SAC) has been designated as a legally protected Special Area of Conservation (SAC) under a number of qualifying Natura 2000 criteria.

The conservation area, which extends significantly beyond Barley Cove bay and covers a 10 km stretch of coastline eastwards to Toormore Bay, was proposed as a Site of Community Importance (SCI) in 2002. It was designated as a Special Area of Conservation in 2018.
