= R637 road (Ireland) =

Road in Ireland

Coordinates: 51.574184°N 9.233546°W

R637 road
- Bóthar R637
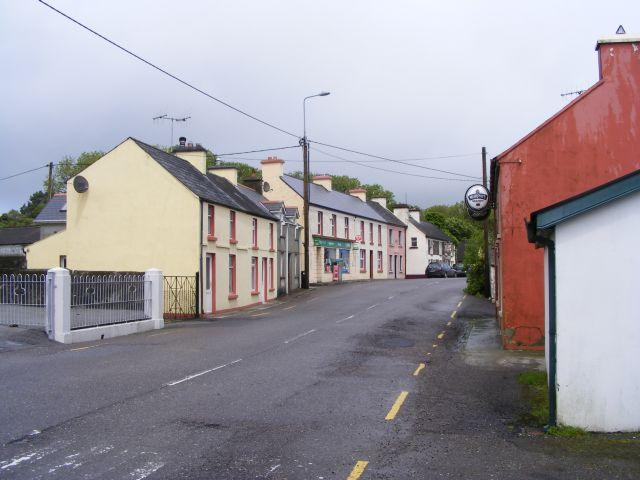
- Drinagh on the R637

Route information
- Length: 26.2 km (16.3 mi)

Major junctions
- From: R586 Manch West
- Crosses River Bandon; R599 Knockane; Passes through Drinagh; Crosses River Saivnose; Crosses River Ilen
- To: N71 east of Skibbereen

Location
- Country: Ireland

Highway system
- Roads in Ireland; Motorways; Primary; Secondary; Regional

The R637 road is a regional road in Ireland, located in southern County Cork.
