= R591 road (Ireland) =

Road in Ireland

R591 road
- Bóthar R591
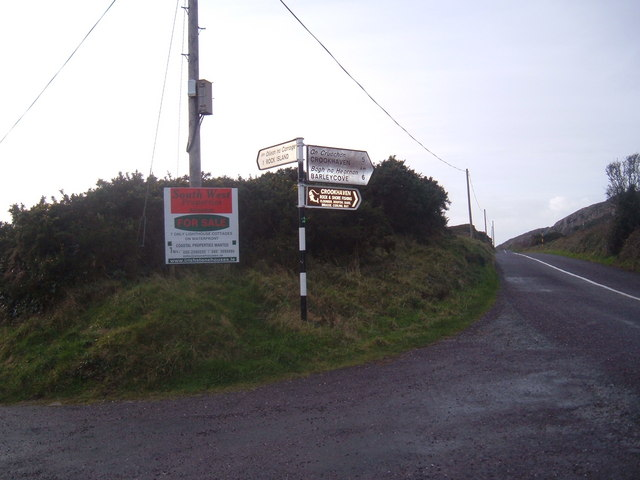
- R591 between Goleen and Crookhaven

Route information
- Length: 36.4 km (22.6 mi)

Major junctions
- From: N71 at Ardyhoolihane, County Cork
- R592 at Toormore
- To: Crookhaven pier

Location
- Country: Ireland

Highway system
- Roads in Ireland; Motorways; Primary; Secondary; Regional
← R590	→ R592

The R591 road is a regional road in Ireland. It is a road on the Mizen Peninsula in County Cork. Most of the road forms part of the Wild Atlantic Way.

The R591 travels southwest from the N71 near Bantry to the village of Durrus. Durrus is also a gateway to the Sheep's Head Peninsula, the Mizen Peninsula's northern neighbour across Dunmanus Bay. The R591 continues via Toormore and Goleen. The road ends at Crookhaven, a yachting harbour village. Before Crookhaven, a scenic, rugged minor road leads to Mizen Head. The R591 is 36.4 km (22.6 mi) long.
