= Rock Island (Ireland) =

Headland in County Cork, Ireland

Coordinates: 51.477°N 9.705°W

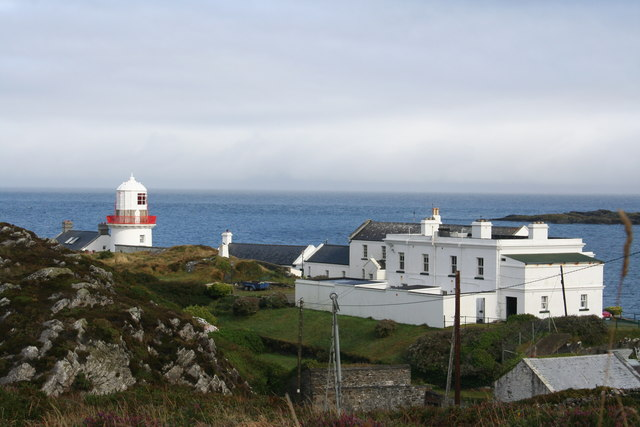
Rock Island and Crookhaven Lighthouse from landside

Rock Island (Irish: Oileán na Carraige) is a promontory in West Cork, Ireland, situated about 2 kilometres (1.2 mi) south of the village of Goleen, at the entrance to the inlet of Crookhaven.

Not a true island, Rock Island is surrounded on three sides by sea while a small strip of land with a road connects it to the mainland. It is notable for the Crookhaven Lighthouse (built in 1843 on the site of a former structure) which lights the way into the natural harbour of Crookhaven. Surrounding the lighthouse are nine cottages (built in the 1860s), once the property of Irish Lighthouses, now privately owned holiday cottages. These were formerly the accommodation for the lighthouse keepers and their families of three local lighthouses: Crookhaven, Mizen Head and Fastnet Rock. The lighthouses are now fully automatic, requiring no keepers. Towards the west end of the peninsula is a terrace of houses built in 1907 as a coastguard station, now converted to private holiday accommodation; this replaced an earlier range of buildings erected in the early 19th century, when Crookhaven was a centre both for legitimate coastal shipping and for smuggling activity. A watch tower was built on Rock Island c. 1800, after the attempted French landing at Bantry in 1796.

== See also ==
- Lighthouses in Ireland
