= R613 road (Ireland) =

Road in Ireland

R613 road
- Bóthar R613
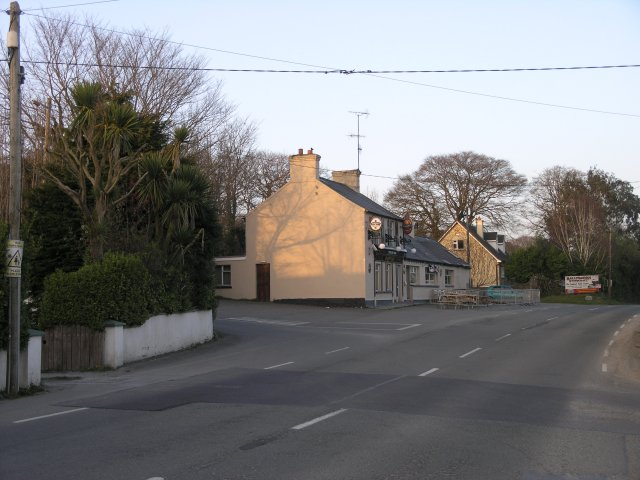
- Ballygarvan on the R613

Route information
- Length: 20 km (12 mi)

Location
- Country: Ireland
- Primary destinations: County Cork; Passes under N71; Ballinhassig; Fivemilebridge; Ballygarvan; Carrigaline; Ringaskiddy

Highway system
- Roads in Ireland; Motorways; Primary; Secondary; Regional

The R613 road is a regional road in Ireland which runs west-east from the N71 near Ballinhassig to the N28 in the centre of Ringaskiddy.

Part of the road between Halfway and Ballinhassig was formerly part of the N71 until this part was replaced by a new section in the 1990s.

The route is 20 km (12 mi) long.

== See also ==
- Roads in Ireland
- Motorways in Ireland
- National primary road
- National secondary road
- History of roads in Ireland
