= R593 road (Ireland) =

Regional road in Ireland

R593 road
- Bóthar R593
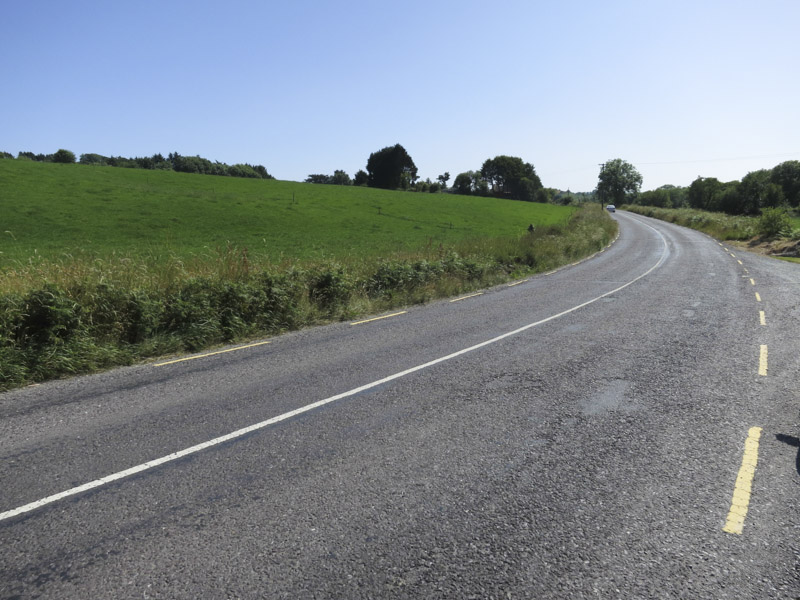
- R593 in Bauravilla, County Cork

Route information
- Length: 12.4 km (7.7 mi)

Major junctions
- From: N71 at Skibbereen, County Cork
- R594 at Derreeny

- To: R586 at Main Street, Drimoleague, County Cork

Location
- Country: Ireland

Highway system
- Roads in Ireland; Motorways; Primary; Secondary; Regional
← R592	→ R594

The R593 road is a regional road in County Cork, Ireland. It travels from the N71 road at Skibbereen to the R586 at Drimoleague. The road is 12.4 kilometres (7.7 mi) long.
