= Drinagh =

Village in County Cork, Ireland

Drinagh Draighneach
- Village
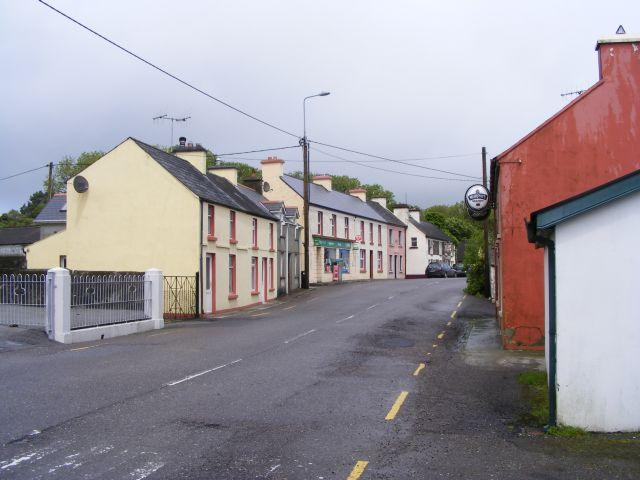
- Drinagh's main street

- Location in Ireland
- Coordinates: 51°39′00″N 9°08′58″W
- Country: Ireland
- Province: Munster
- County: County Cork
- Time zone: UTC+0 (WET)
  - Summer (DST): UTC-1 (IST (WEST))
- Irish Grid Reference: W 2049 4476

Drinagh (Irish: Draighneach, meaning 'place producing blackthorns') is a village in County Cork, Ireland. It lies on the R637 road between the towns of Dunmanway and Skibbereen. Drinagh is also close to Rosscarbery and Drimoleague. The village is in a civil parish of the same name.

Drinagh has a tennis court, two churches, one primary school, two pubs, one grocery store, a hardware store and a creamery. The local Catholic church, Sacred Heart Roman Catholic Church, was built in 1932. Curraghalickey lake is located 3km east of the village and provides the mains water supply for the village.

The local amateur soccer club, Drinagh Rangers A.F.C., was founded in 1983. The club plays its home matches at the Canon Crowley Park, which is located on the R637 Road. The club has men's, women's and underage teams and usually plays in red and black striped kits with plain black shorts and socks. The men's first team won the 2020 West Cork League Premier Division title.

According to the 2016 census, the electoral division in which the village lies had a population of 360.

Notable people from Drinagh include Sean Hurley, who was 29 when he was fatally wounded during the 1916 Easter Rising in Dublin. Fighting under Commandant Ned Daly, Hurley spent much of the Rising defending the rear of the Four Courts garrison from repeated British assaults. On 29 April 1916, shortly before the rebels' surrender, Hurley was shot in the head and arm, and was taken to Fr Matthew Hall where he died.

A jig titled "The Humours of Drinagh" can be found in Matt Cranitch's 2013 book, Irish Fiddle Tunes.

== See also ==
- List of towns and villages in Ireland
