= Union Hall, County Cork =

Fishing village in County Cork, Ireland

Union Hall Bréantrá (Irish)
- Village
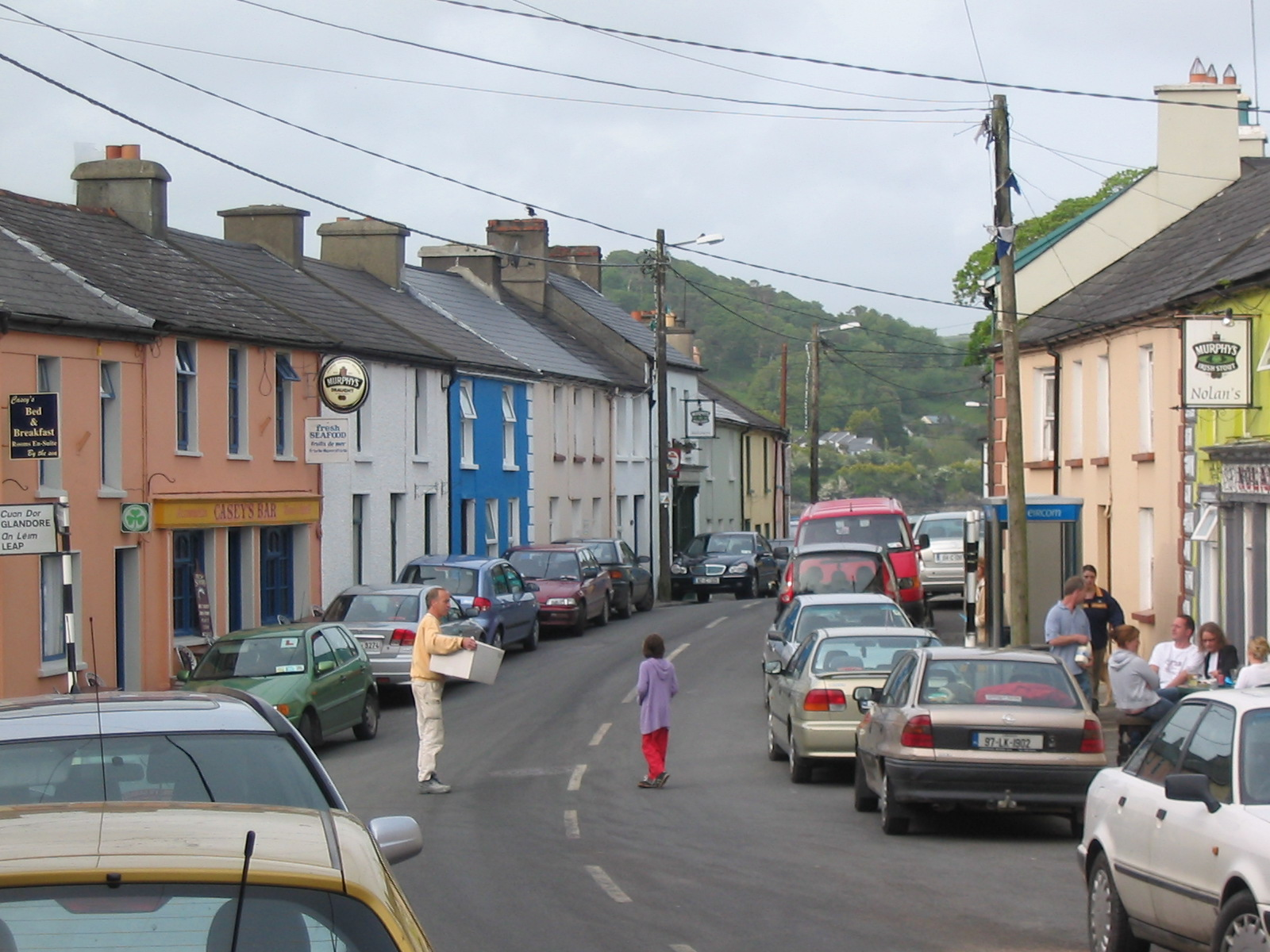
- Main Street

- Location in Ireland
- Coordinates: 51°33′29″N 9°08′19″W
- Country: Ireland
- Province: Munster
- County: County Cork
- District: Skibbereen
- Elevation: 0 m (0 ft)

Population (2022)
  - Total: 359
- Time zone: UTC+0 (WET)
  - Summer (DST): UTC-1 (IST (WEST))
- Irish Grid Reference: W206345

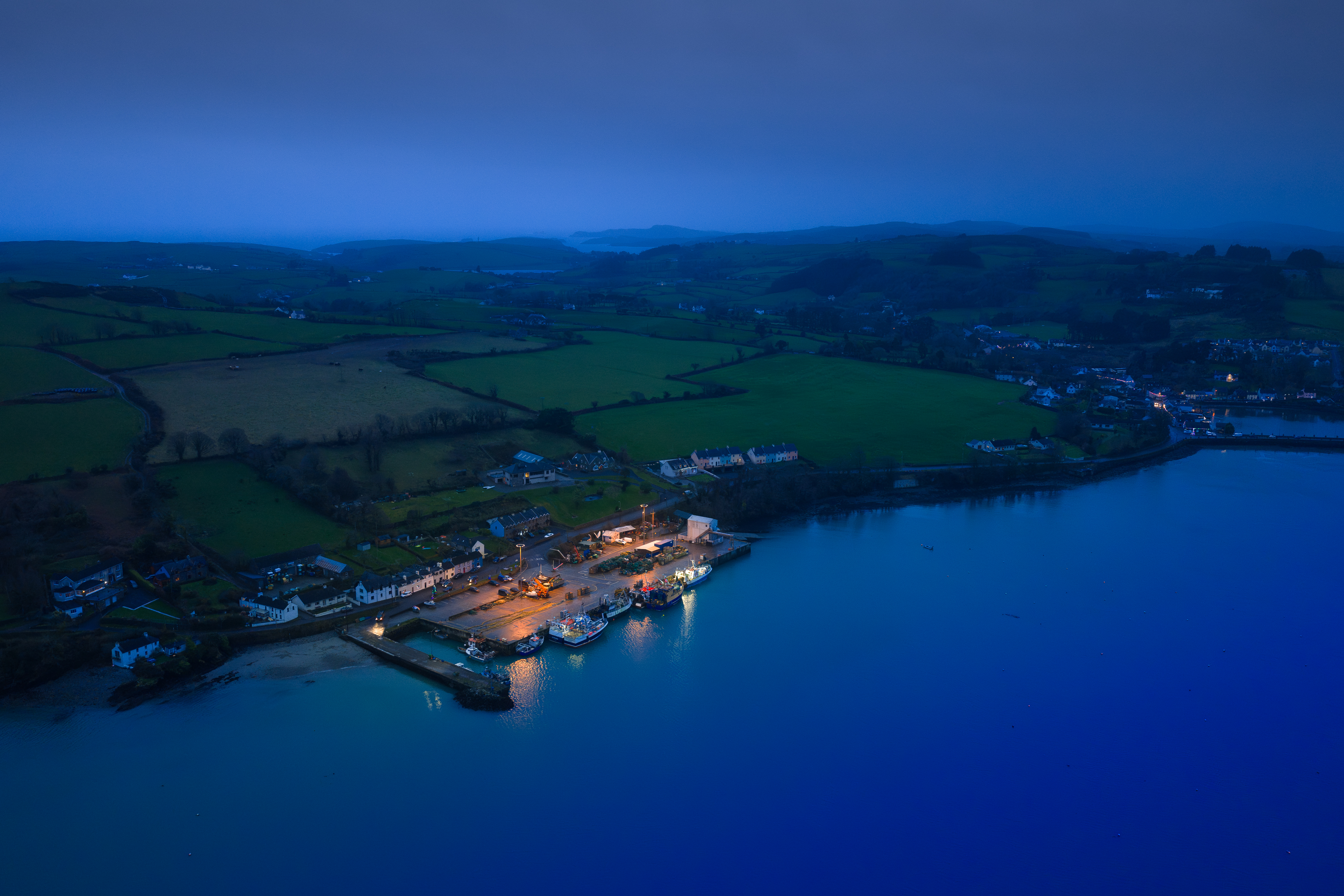
Union Hall Lifeboat Station at Keelbeg Pier

Union Hall (Irish: Bréantrá), also Unionhall, is a small fishing village in County Cork, Ireland, located on the west side of Glandore Harbour. Its nearest neighbour to the west is Castletownshend; to the east, Glandore village. It is approximately 10 kilometres south-east of Skibbereen. As of the 2022 census, 359 people were living in Union Hall.

A key source of employment in the area is fishing, and the pier has its own ice plant and fish processing factory run by Glenmar Shellfish Ltd. Tourism is also an economic driver, and among the area's attractions are boat trips to view whales, dolphins and seals.

== Location and access ==
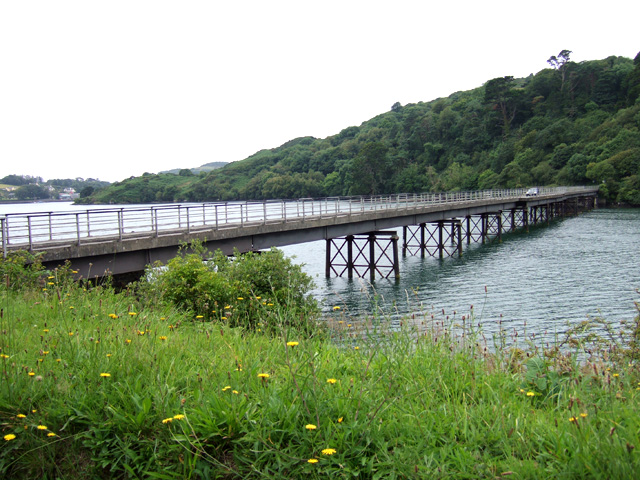
Poulgorm Bridge

The coastal village lies on a hill, and has a small harbour for small fishing boats and other small craft.

By road it is accessible over the narrow Poulgorm Bridge on the R597 regional road to Glandore, Rosscarbery and Leap. The bridge is only one lane wide, so traffic must wait for the bridge to be clear before crossing. The bridge was built c.1890, and featured in David Puttnam's 1994 film "War of the Buttons".

== History ==
Archaeological sites in the immediate area include evidence of a number of ringforts, a souterrain and a lime kiln in Ballincolla townland. Also nearby are the remains of 13th century and 16th century O'Donovan castles at Castle Eyre (Listarkin townland) and Raheen Castle (Raheen townland).

The Irish name Bréantrá means "rotten strand". An alternative is Trá an Bhróin "strand of sorrow". One tradition says the name originates from the blood spilt at a battle fought there in the early 16th century between O'Donovan septs of Clancahill and Sliocht Íomhair. The adjoining townland name Clontaff is likewise explained as Cluain a Catha "battle meadow", although the official name is Cluain Cathail.

The English name "Union Hall" was originally that of a big house built and named after the Act of Union 1800 by William Somerville Limrick (or Limerick), a lieutenant colonel in the Madras Army of the East India Company. The house, later named Unionhall House, was burnt out by the Irish Republican Army in the Irish War of Independence. In July–August 1922, as part of the Irish Free State offensive of the Civil War, national army troops landed at the quay in Union Hall in order to outflank the local Republican forces.

In January 2012, the Tit Bonhomme fishing vessel sank near Glandore Harbour, and the people of Union Hall spent several weeks searching for the Irish and Egyptian sailors who died. They were presented with a People of the Year Award in September 2012.

The village served as the setting for the titular fictional location of Bodkin in the 2024 Netflix TV series of the same name.

== Amenities and tourism ==
There is a supermarket and a fish shop in the village. There is also a post office and a number of bed and breakfasts.

Union Hall has a Roman Catholic church (built c.1832 and dedicated to St. Bridget) to the south of the village, and a Church of Ireland church close to the village centre (built c.1840).

The area around Union Hall is known for its hills, woodlands, rivers and islands. There are a number of small inlets, bays and beaches.

== See also ==
- List of towns and villages in Ireland
