= R597 road (Ireland) =

Road in Ireland

R597 road
- Bóthar R597
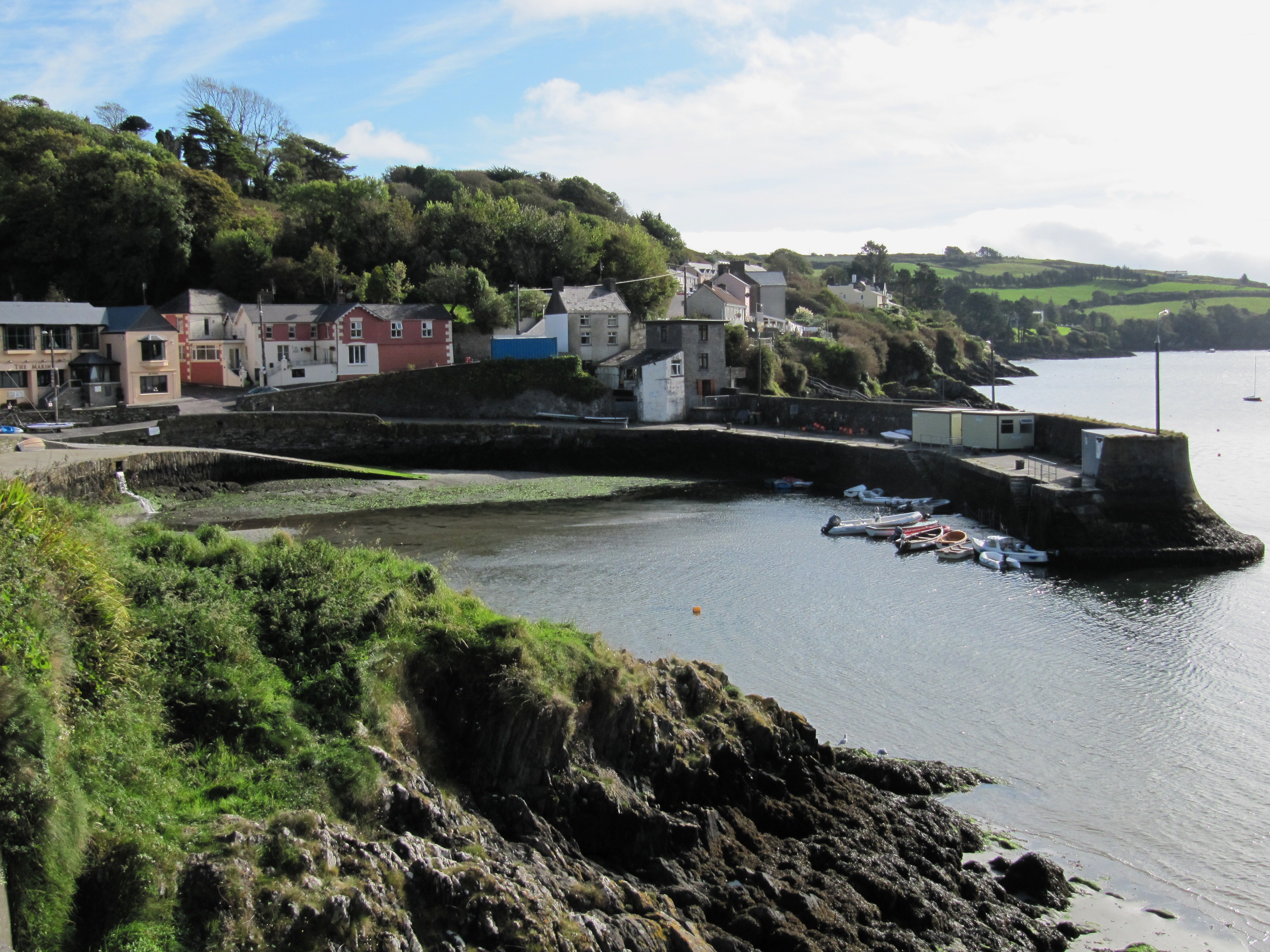
- R597 above harbour at Glandore, County Cork

Route information
- Length: 10.2 km (6.3 mi)

Major junctions
- From: N71 at Leap, County Cork
- To: N71 at Newtown Rosscarbery

Location
- Country: Ireland

Highway system
- Roads in Ireland; Motorways; Primary; Secondary; Regional
← R596	→ R598

The R597 road is a regional road in Ireland. It is a loop road from the N71 on the Haven Coast in west County Cork. The road forms part of the Wild Atlantic Way.

The R597 travels south from the N71 at Leap to the port village of Glandore. After Glandore, the road travels east and passes the megalithic Drombeg stone circle. It rejoins the N71 at the town of Rosscarbery. The R597 is 10.2 km (6.3 mi) long.
