= St Mary's Church, Caheragh =

Anglican church in County Cork, Ireland

St Mary's Church
- Country: Ireland
- Denomination: Church of Ireland

St Mary's Church is a small Gothic Revival Anglican church located in Caheragh, near Drimoleague, County Cork, Ireland. It was completed in either 1825 or 1829. It is dedicated to Mary, mother of Jesus. It is part of the Diocese of Cork, Cloyne, and Ross.

== History ==
The church of St Mary was built in either 1825, or 1829. It was constructed with the aid of a grant from the Board of First Fruits, amounting to a total of IR£650. An organ was inserted in the church in 1870.
