= Ballingurteen =

Village in County Cork, Ireland

Ballingurteen Baile an Ghoirtín
- Village
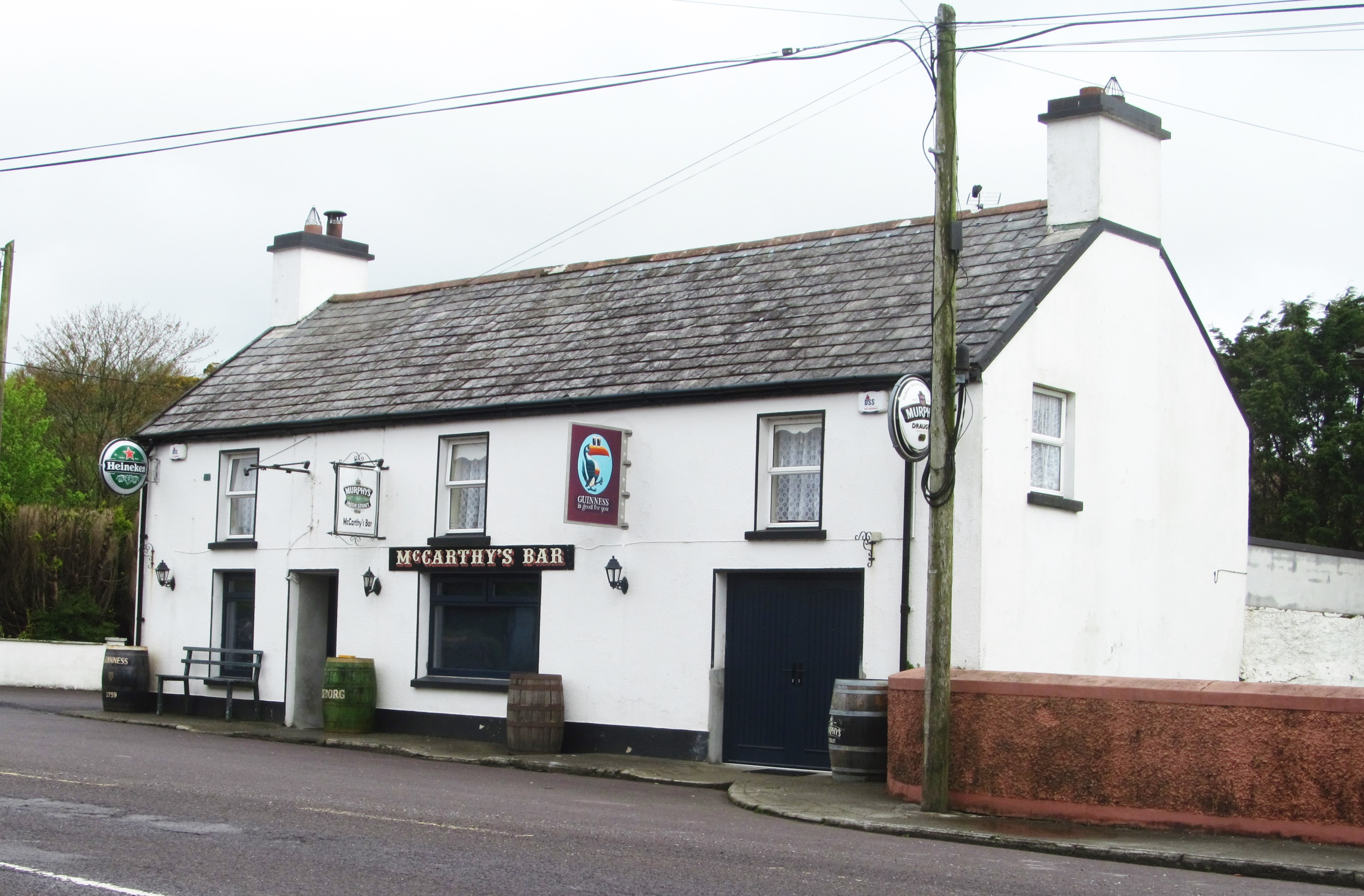
- Pub in Ballingurteen

- Location in Ireland
- Coordinates: 51°40′34″N 9°01′39″W
- Country: Ireland
- Province: Munster
- County: County Cork
- Time zone: UTC+0 (WET)
  - Summer (DST): UTC-1 (IST (WEST))
- Irish Grid Reference: W 2898 4755

Ballingurteen (Irish: Baile an Ghoirtín) is a village in County Cork, in the southwest of Ireland. It lies on the R599 road between the towns of Dunmanway and Clonakilty.

== See also ==
- List of towns and villages in Ireland
