= R599 road (Ireland) =

Regional road in Ireland

R599 road
- Bóthar R599
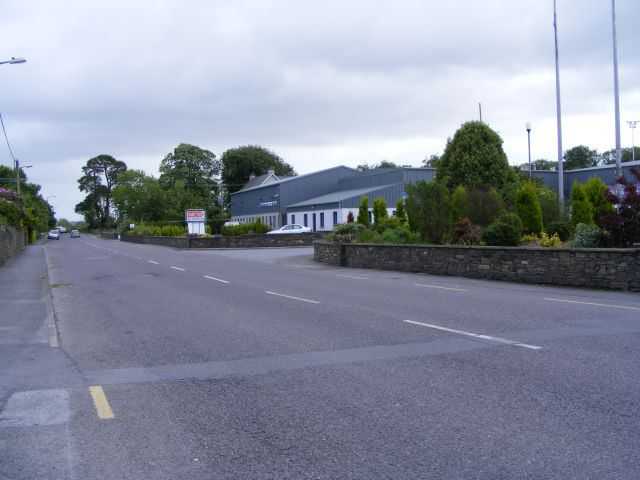
- R599 in Dunmanway

Route information
- Length: 20.1 km (12.5 mi)

Location
- Country: Ireland
- Primary destinations: County Cork; Leaves the R586 at Bridge Street in Dunmanway; Clubhouse Cross; Lisbealad East; Knockane Bridge; Ballingurteen; Ardgideen Bridge; Keohane's Cross; Terminates at a junction with the N71 west of Clonakilty

Highway system
- Roads in Ireland; Motorways; Primary; Secondary; Regional

The R599 is a regional road in County Cork, Ireland, connecting the R586 in Dunmanway to the N71 just west of Clonakilty.

== See also ==
- Roads in Ireland
