= Mizen Head =

Point in southwest Ireland

Mizen Head Carn Uí Néid
- Dolerite sill
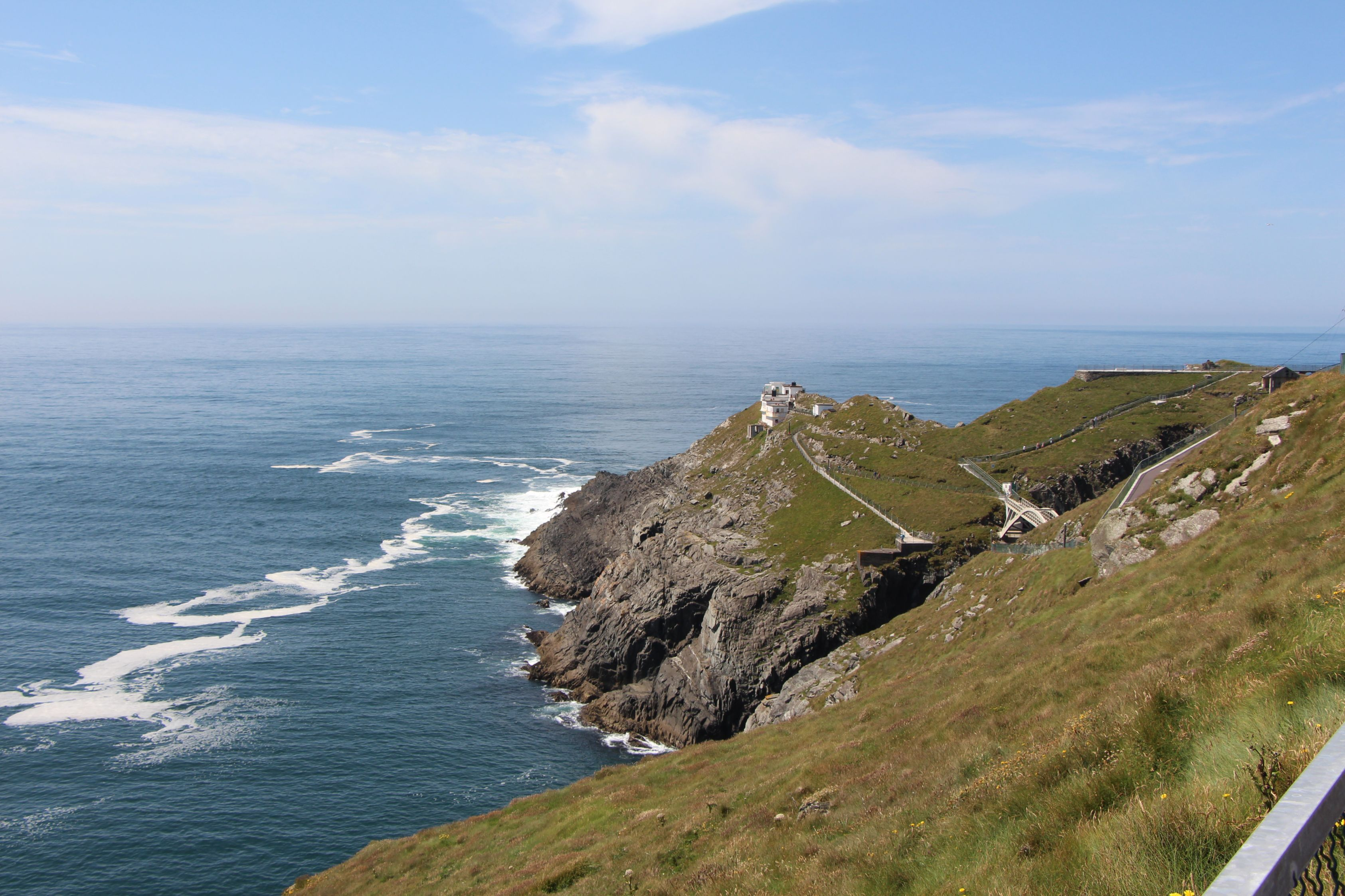
- Mizen Head, the most southwesterly point of Ireland

- Location within island of Ireland
- Coordinates: 51°27′1″N 9°49′10″W
- Grid position: D180438
- Location: County Cork, Ireland
- Elevation: 101.63 m (333.4 ft)

Mizen Head (Irish: Carn Uí Néid) is traditionally regarded as the most southerly point of mainland Ireland although Brow Head is the actual southernmost point. It is at the end of the Mizen Peninsula in the district of Carbery in County Cork.

== Geography ==
Mizen Head is one of the extreme points of the island of Ireland and is a major tourist attraction, noted for its dramatic cliff scenery. One of the main transatlantic shipping routes passes close by to the south, and Mizen Head was, for many seafarers, the first (or last) sight of Europe.

The tip of the peninsula is almost an island, cut off by a deep chasm, now spanned by a bridge; this gives access to an old signal station, a weather station, and a lighthouse. The signal station, once permanently staffed, is now a museum housing displays relating to the site's strategic significance for transatlantic shipping and communications, including the pioneering efforts of Guglielmo Marconi. The "99 steps" which formed part of the original access route have been supplemented by a series of paths and viewing platforms, and a full range of visitor facilities is available at the entrance to the site. The villages of Ballydehob, Crookhaven, Goleen, and Schull are located on the peninsula to the east.

Nearby Brow Head, also on the Mizen Peninsula and a short distance to the east, is several metres further south than Mizen Head. Nevertheless, geography books have long measured the length of Ireland, diagonally northeast-to-southwest, as "from Fair Head to Mizen Head" or north-to-south "from Malin Head to Mizen Head".

== History ==
Ptolemy's Geography (2nd century AD) referred to the point as the "southern headland" (Ancient Greek: Νότιον ἄκρον, romanized: Notion akron).

The headland's Irish name, Carn Uí Néid, means "cairn of Néid's grandson". This refers to Balor, a leader of the Fomorians in Irish mythology. In a tale dating from at least the 12th century, the god Lugh defeats Balor in combat and chases him to Mizen Head. There, Lugh beheads Balor and sets the severed head on a large rock, which then shatters.

== Gallery ==
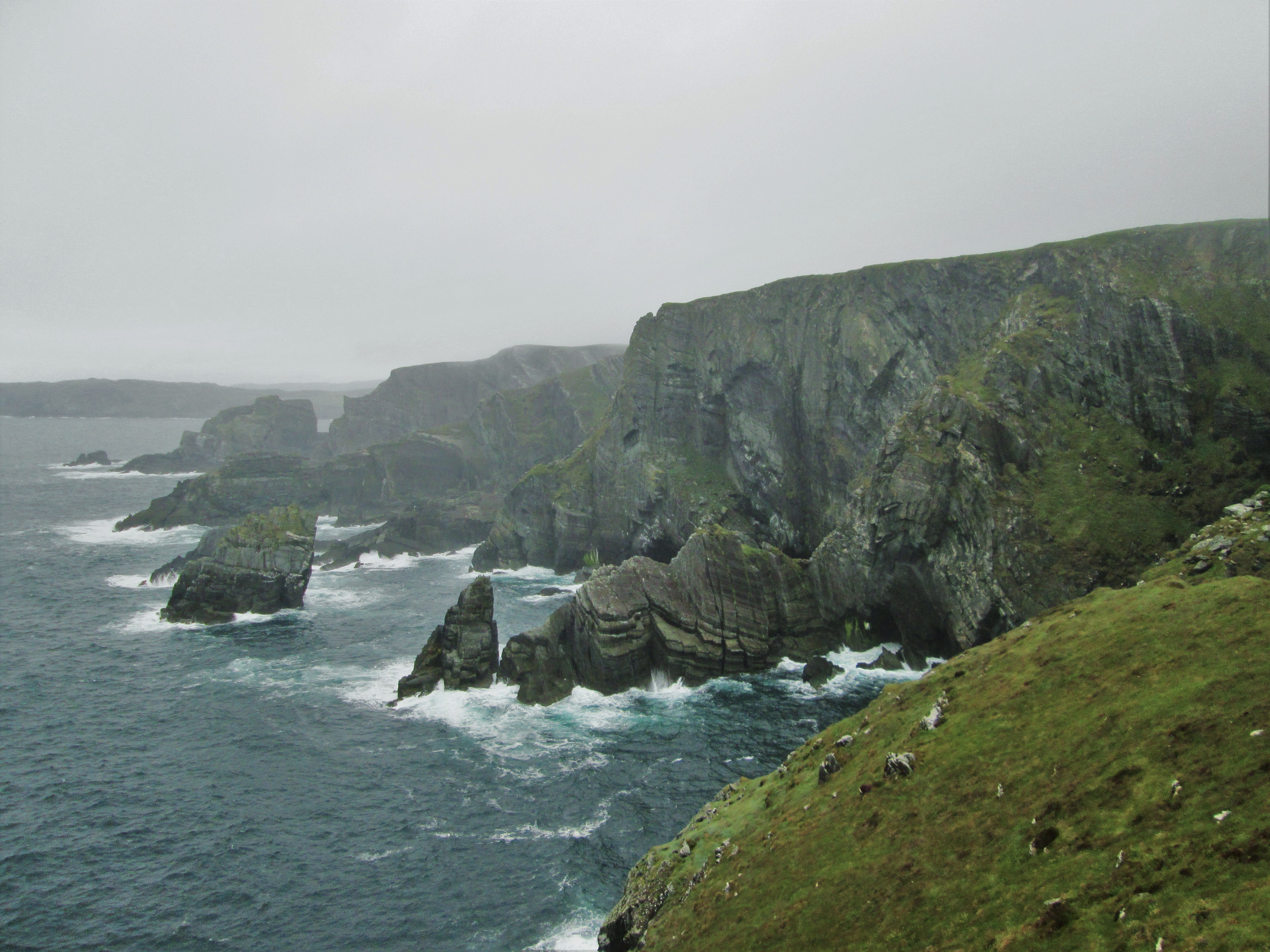
View of the coast

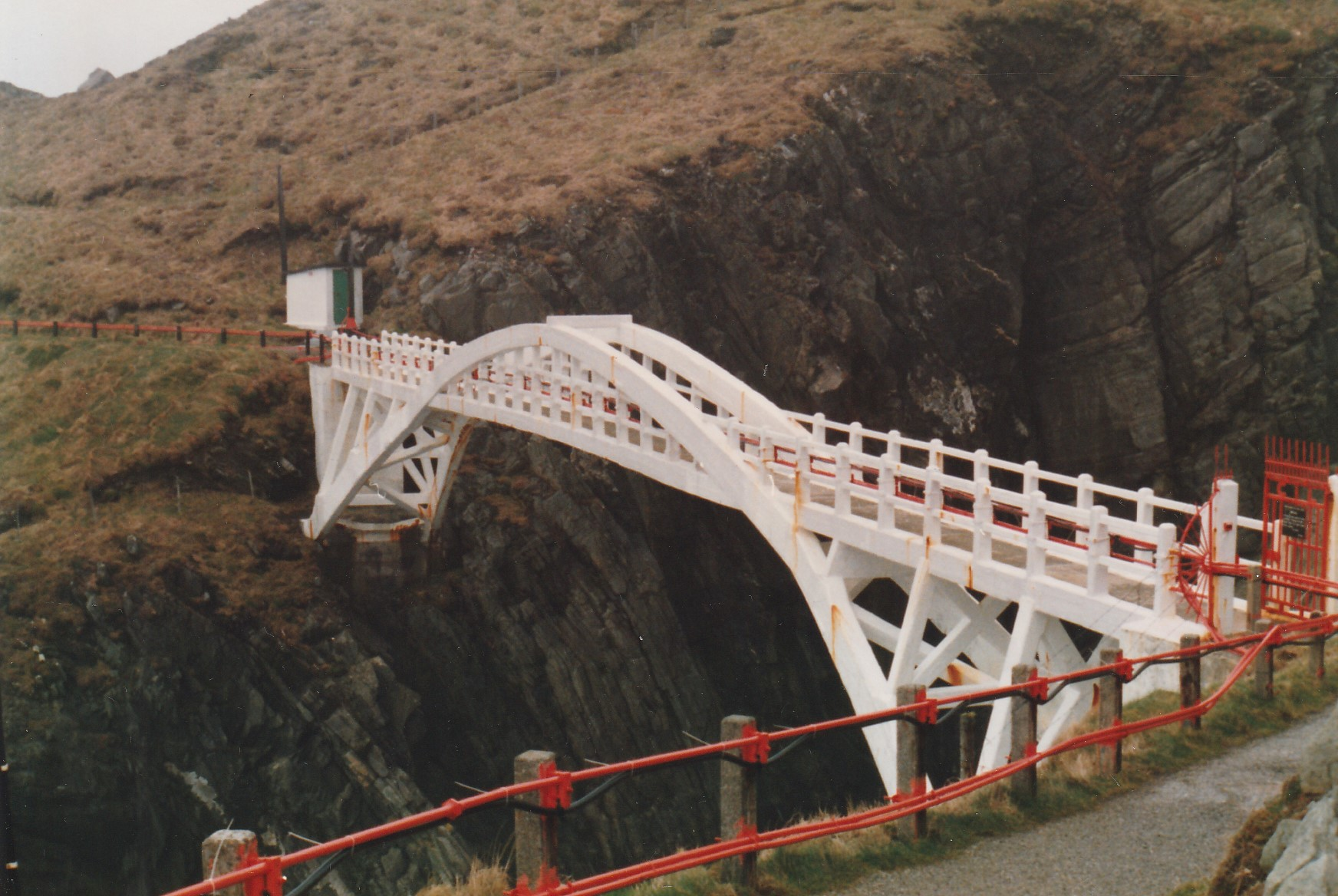
Mizen Head Bridge in 1987

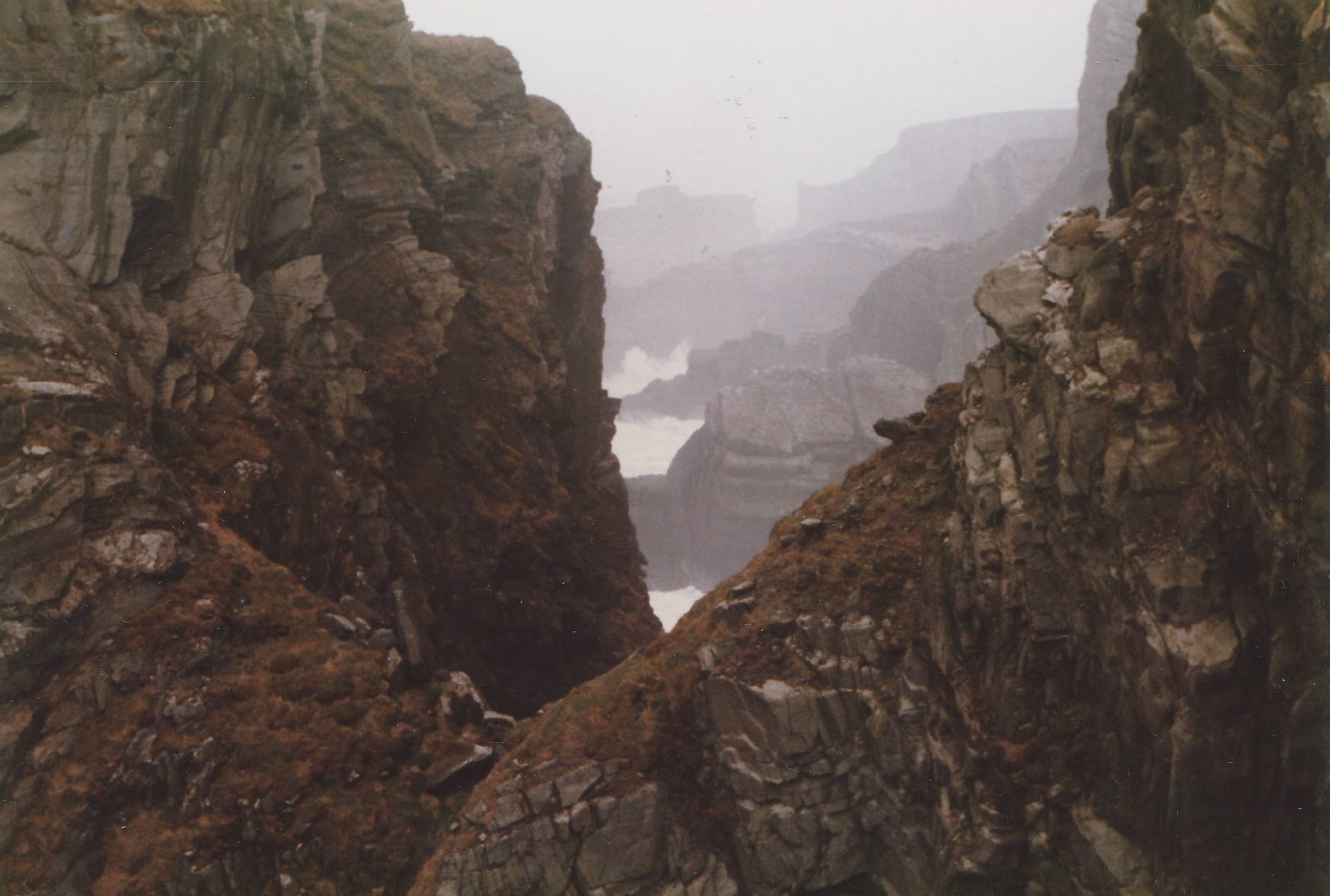
Foggy weather in 1987

== See also ==
- Carbery's Hundred Isles
- Malin to Mizen
- Mount Gabriel
- Wild Atlantic Way

== Sources ==
- Mizen Journal, Archaeology Paddy O'Leary, No 11, 2003 ISSN 1649-203X
- Archaeological Inventory of County Cork, Vol 1 West Cork, Office of Public Works, 1992 ISBN 0-7076-0175-4
- BHAS Journal vol 2 pp. 106–119, Townlands Donal Fitzgerald ISSN 0791-6612
- Northside of the Mizen, General reading, Patrick McCarthy & Richard Hawkes
