= Christ Church, Glandore =

19th Century Anglican church in Ireland

Christ Church
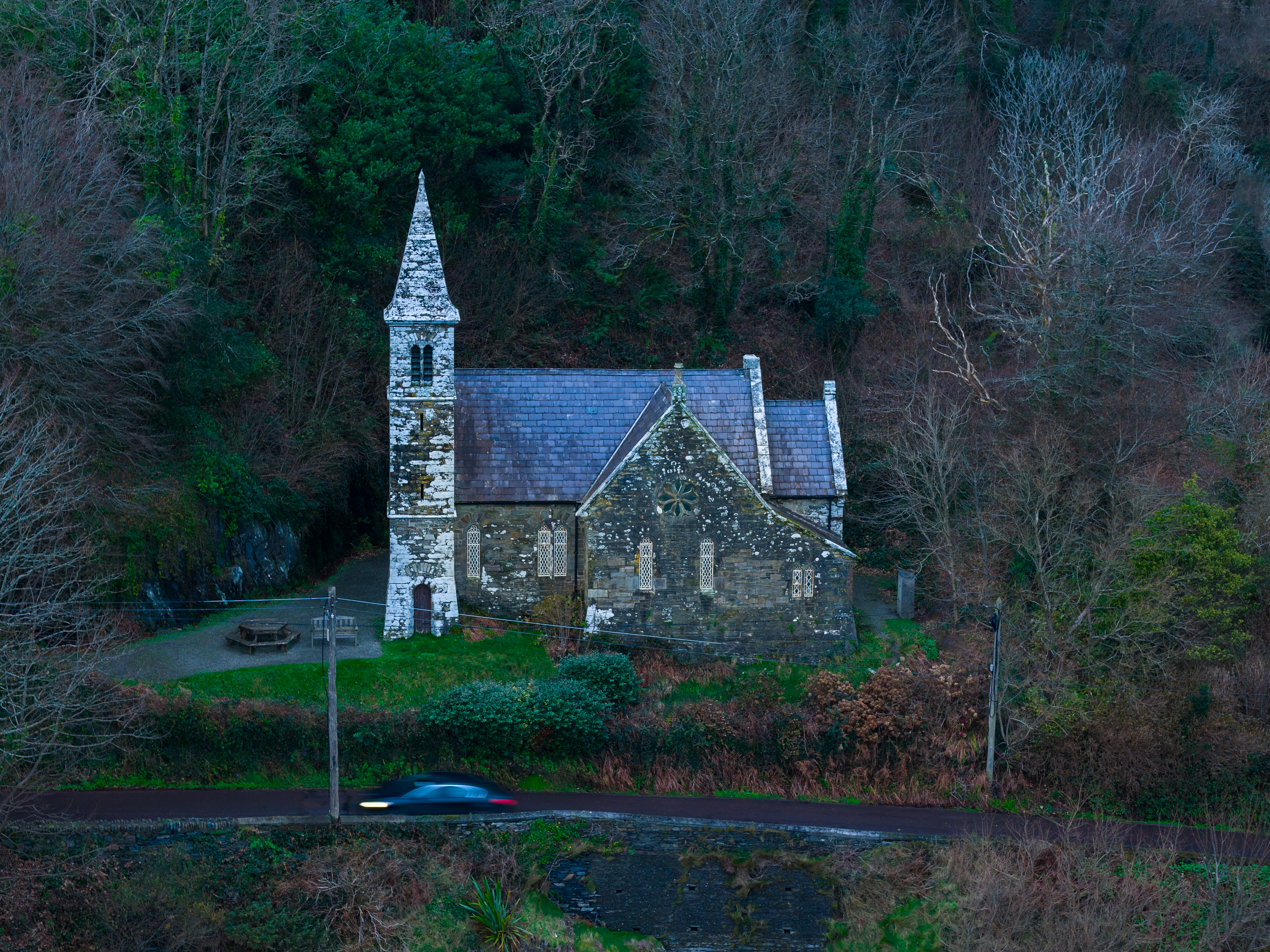
- The church as seen from Glandore Harbour
- Christ Church
- 51.56592°N 9.12364°W
- Location: Glandore
- Country: Ireland
- Denomination: Church of Ireland

History
- Dedication: Jesus Christ
- Dedicated: 1861
- Consecrated: 1861

Architecture
- Functional status: active
- Architect: Joseph Welland
- Style: Neo-Ghotic

Specifications
- Materials: limestone, sandstone, slate

Administration
- Parish: Kilfaughnabeg

Christ Church is a small Gothic Revival Anglican church located in Glandore, County Cork, Ireland. It was completed in 1861 and is dedicated to Jesus Christ. It lies within the Ross Union of Parishes in the Diocese of Cork, Cloyne, and Ross.

== History ==
Christ Church is located in the parish of Kilfaughnabeg. It was built between 1860 and 1861, and was sited to give views of Glandore Harbour, and consecrated on 17 September 1861 by bishop William FitzGerald. At that time it served a community of 53 churchgoers.

In 2011 the building was deemed unsafe and closed. Between 2012 and 2016, a community fundraising effort allowed significant work to be made, including connecting electricity and repairing the stonework. As of the early 2020s, the church serves as an active venue for religious and cultural events.

== Architecture ==
The church was designed in the Early English style by Welland & Gillespie, and features a distinctive "ornate" bell tower. It features stained glass windows by Hardman & Co., depicting Christ in Majesty flanked by angels with thuribles.
