= R595 road (Ireland) =

Road in Ireland

R595 road
- Bóthar R595
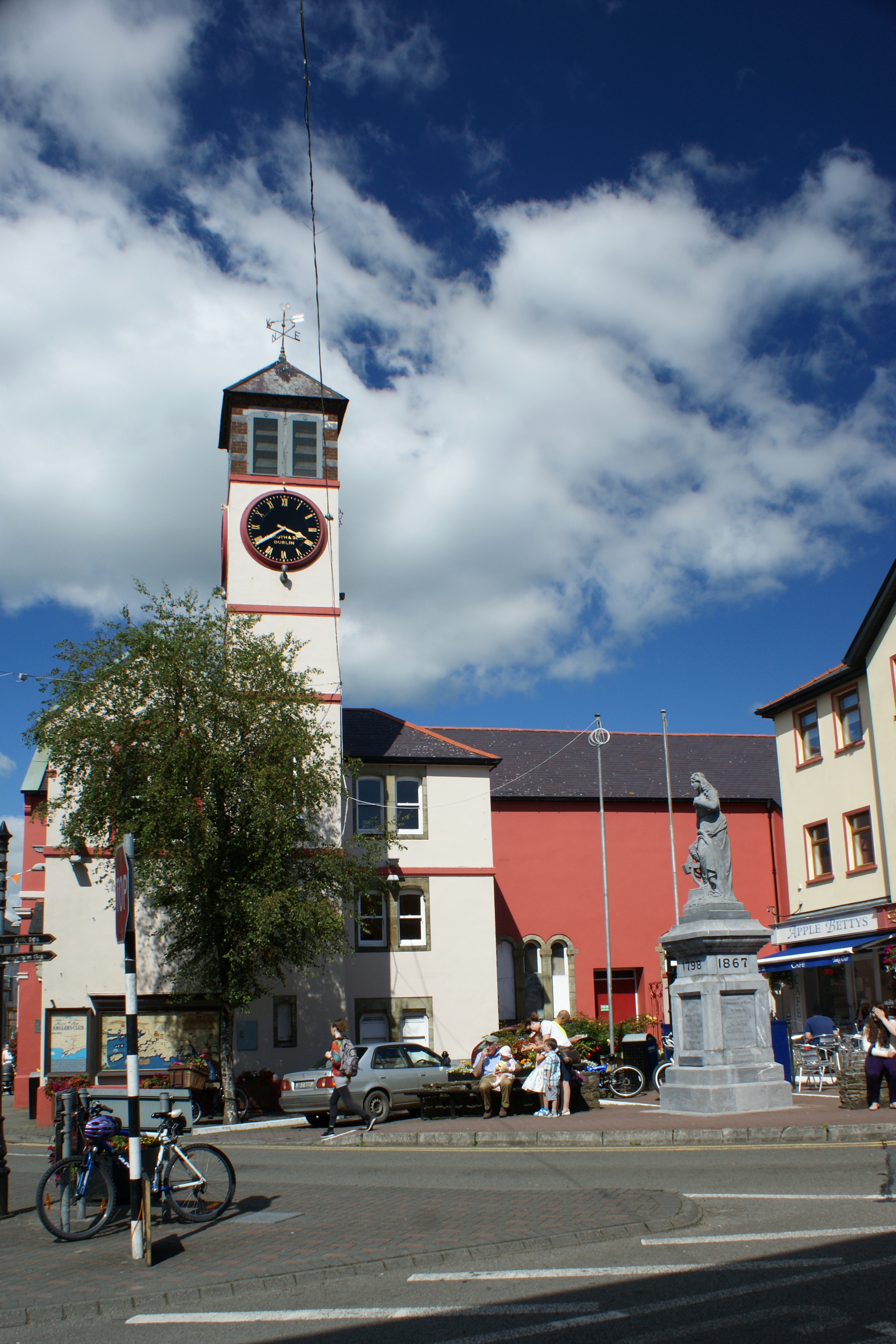
- R595 in Skibbereen, County Cork

Route information
- Length: 13.6 km (8.5 mi)

Major junctions
- From: N71 at Cork Road, Skibbereen, County Cork
- R596 at The Four Crosses, Skibbereen
- To: at Baltimore

Location
- Country: Ireland

Highway system
- Roads in Ireland; Motorways; Primary; Secondary; Regional
| ← R594 | → R596 |

The R595 road is a regional road in Ireland. It is a road on the Haven Coast in west County Cork. The road forms part of the Wild Atlantic Way.

The R595 travels southwest from the N71 at Skibbereen along the estuary of the River Ilen. It ends at the port village of Baltimore, where ferries depart for Sherkin Island and Cape Clear Island. The R595 is 13.6 km (8.5 mi) long.
