= R594 road (Ireland) =

Regional road in County Cork, Ireland

R594 road
- Bóthar R594

Route information
- Length: 7.8 km (4.8 mi)

Major junctions
- From: R586 at Aghaville, County Cork

- To: R593 at Derreeny

Location
- Country: Ireland

Highway system
- Roads in Ireland; Motorways; Primary; Secondary; Regional
← R593	→ R595

The R594 road is a regional road in County Cork, Ireland. It travels from the R586 at Aghaville to the R593 at Derreeny. The road is 7.8 kilometres (4.8 mi) long.
