= R586 road (Ireland) =

Road in County Cork, Ireland

Coordinates: 51.709164°N 9.126705°W

R586 road
- Bóthar R586
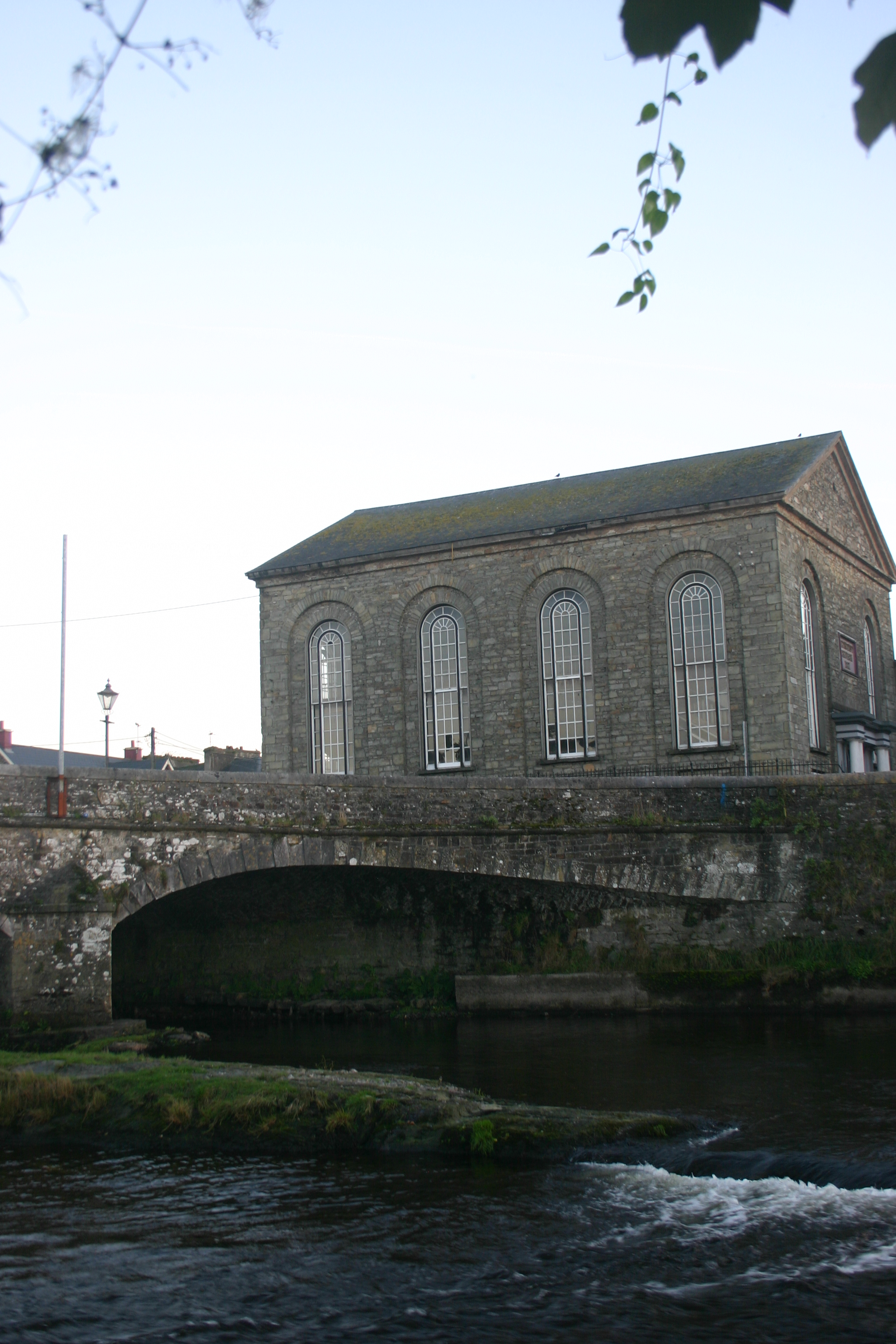
- Bandon Bridge carries the R586 over the River Bandon

Route information
- Length: 46 km (29 mi)

Major junctions
- From: N71 Keilnascarta
- R594; R593 Drimoleague; R599 Dunmanway; R587 Macroom; R637; R588 Enniskean; R589 Bandon
- To: N71 Bandon

Location
- Country: Ireland

Highway system
- Roads in Ireland; Motorways; Primary; Secondary; Regional

The R586 road is a long regional road in Ireland. It starts at Bandon, then goes through Enniskean, Dunmanway, Drimoleague and terminates at the N71 road (Ireland) roughly 5 KM from Bantry. The R586 is often called "A short way around west cork" because its more faster than the N71. The speed limit is 80 km/h but after Enniskean, it goes to 100 km/h. regional road in Republic of Ireland, located in West Cork.
