= R588 road (Ireland) =

Road in Ireland

Coordinates: 51.782127°N 8.987794°W

R588 road
- Bóthar R588

Route information
- Length: 24.3 km (15.1 mi)

Major junctions
- From: R585 Coppeen
- R586 Enniskean; Crosses River Bandon, Argideen River and River Feale
- To: R880 Clonakilty

Location
- Country: Ireland

Highway system
- Roads in Ireland; Motorways; Primary; Secondary; Regional

The R588 road is a regional road in Ireland, located in west County Cork.
