= Clodagh Standing Stones =

Pair of standing stones in County Cork, Ireland

- Galláin an Chladaigh (Irish)
- Pookeen Alignment
- Location within Ireland
- 51.698069°N 9.224196°W
- Type: Standing stones (stone row)
- Location: Clodagh, Drimoleague, County Cork, Ireland

History
- Built: c. 2000 BC

Site notes
- Elevation: 192 m (630 ft)
- Height: 1 m (3 ft 3 in)

National monument of Ireland
- Official name: Clodagh
- Reference no.: 536

Clodagh Standing Stones is a pair of standing stones forming a stone row and National Monument located in County Cork, Ireland.

== Location ==
Clodagh Standing Stones stand 4.8 km (3.0 mi) northeast of Drimoleague.

== History ==
The stones probably date to the Bronze Age period.

The purpose of standing stones is unclear; they may have served as boundary markers, ritual or ceremonial sites, burial sites or astrological alignments.

== Description ==
The stones are both about 1 m (3.3 ft) tall.
