= Glandore =

Harbour and village in County Cork, Ireland

Glandore Cuan Dor
- Village
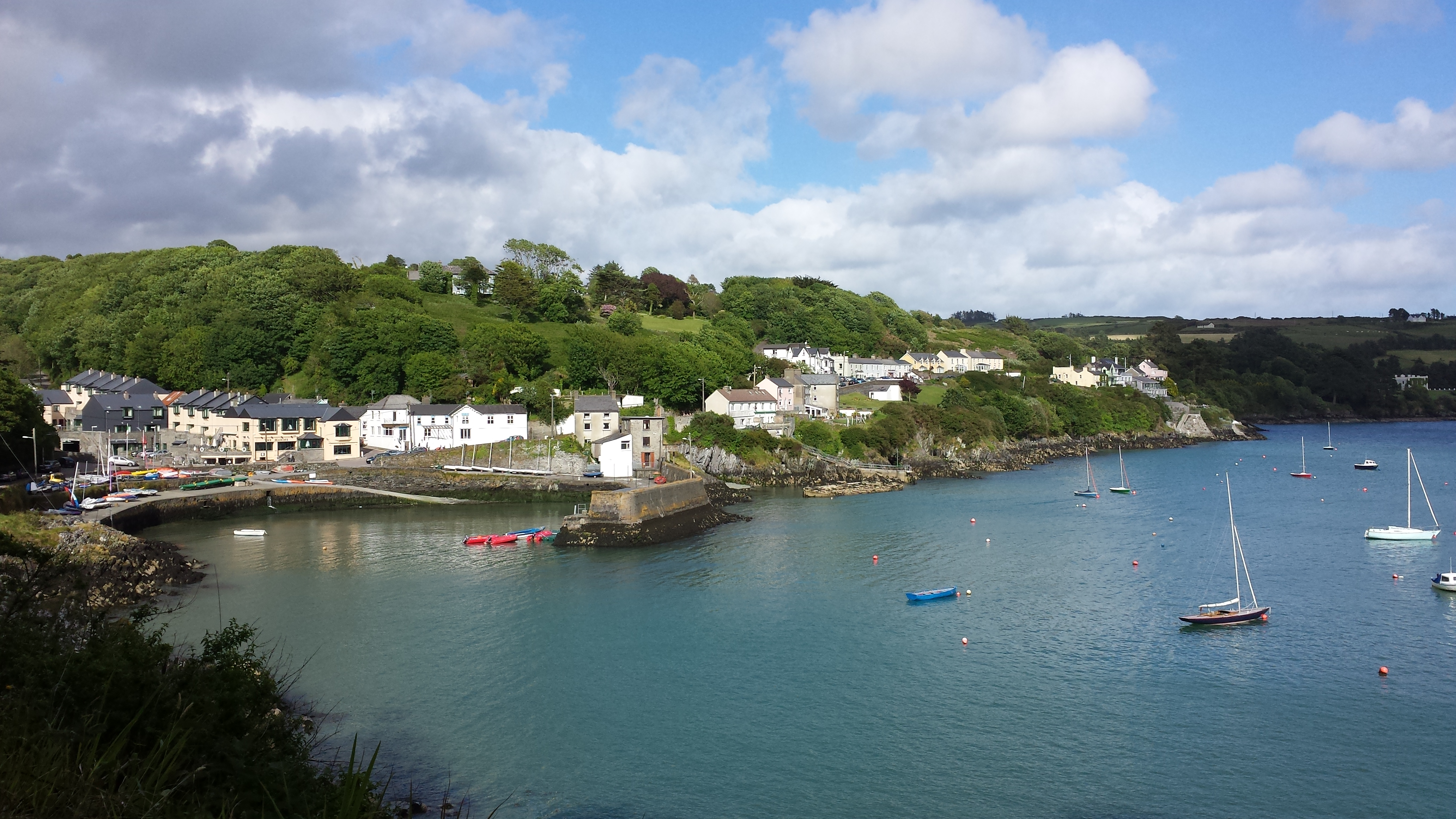
- The village of Glandore with the pier at the base of the village. Main access point for sailors making entry to land.

- Location in Ireland
- Coordinates: 51°33′52″N 09°07′33″W
- Country: Ireland
- Province: Munster
- County: County Cork
- District: Skibbereen
- Time zone: UTC+0 (WET)
  - Summer (DST): UTC-1 (IST (WEST))

Glandore (Irish: Cuan Dor, meaning harbour of the oak trees) is the name of a village and harbour in County Cork, Ireland. It is off the N71 road, about 10 km east of Skibbereen.

The village has several pubs, with traditional music performances. It is a popular holiday destination. Notable homeowners and residents include Margaret Jay, former leader of the House of Lords, and at one time the businessman Tony O'Reilly. The former Church of Ireland rectory (originally called East View), along with Bearna Donn (originally called West View) and Stone Hall were built in the 19th century by the Allen family. The village yacht club's headquarters is located near the pier on the Old School Road.

The Irish Coast Guard has a unit based in Glandore at the "Rocket House" at the western end of the village.

An annual regatta takes place on the third weekend of August. Sailing is one of the main attractions, with rowing and swimming also popular. The Lar Casey Cup is awarded to the winning Dragon class yacht. In former years there were Irish dancing competitions in the village square.

Every two years (on odd years) the Glandore Classic Boat Regatta is held during the second week of July.

== Geography ==
The village is located on the east side of Glandore Harbour. The harbour is approximately three miles long north to south with the village of Leap at the north end, Union Hall on the west side and two small islands, named Adam and Eve, at the mouth of the harbour at the south end. The sailing directions in the harbour are "to avoid Adam and hug Eve". Rocks in the middle of the harbour called 'The Perches' have a flashing green mark to the western extremity indicating a safe channel. The Danger Rock further up the harbour is indicated with a flashing northern cardinal mark. The harbour itself is located midway in Glandore bay which is the area between The Galley Head and Toe Head.

Townlands in the Glandore area include Rushanes, Aughatubber, Drombeg (in which Drombeg stone circle is located), Kilfinnan, Kilfaughnabeg, Brulea, Maulmarine, Kilcosan, Reenogreena, Cregg, Tralong, Carriglusky and Knockardan.

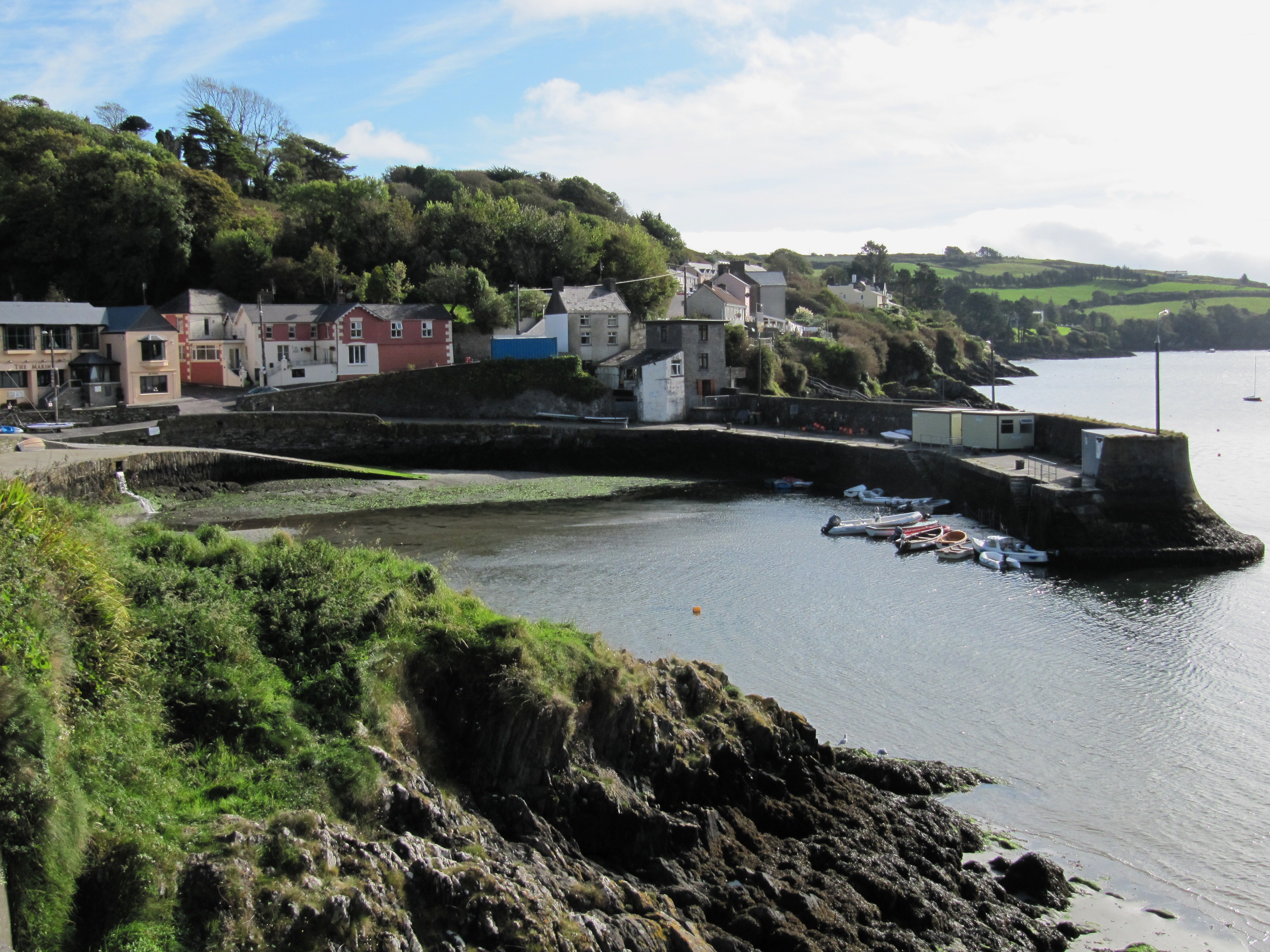
Glandore Harbour

== History ==
Due to its location, Glandore was one of the earlier settlements in the area. In 1215, the Normans built two castles here. The present pier and wall were built in the first half of the 19th century. A fair was held at Trá an Aonaigh (Beach of the Fair) also known as Tralong (Beach of the ship) in the 18th century.

Glandore was then for centuries closely associated with the O'Donovan family, who gained control of the harbour from the Normans and occupied its castles.

== Wildlife ==
The harbour supports a wide array of species. Seabirds include grey herons, oystercatchers, gannets, shags, cormorants, herring gulls and black tipped gulls. A number of seals live in the harbour. Whale, dolphin, porpoise and shark are frequently found in the greater bay area between the Galley Head and Toe Head. There are many seals in the area also. Mackerel can be plentiful in the harbour depending on the time of year.

== Sailing ==
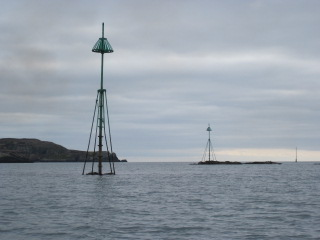
Navigation marks in Glandore.

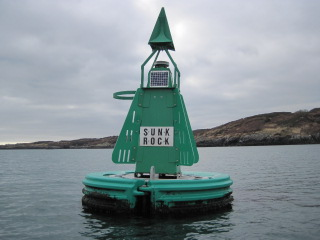
Danger Buoy Glandore

The local yacht club organizes 16+ courses every year for junior sailors and adults, as well as powerboat and instructors' courses. Every odd year, Glandore hosts its "Classic Boat Regatta" which takes place over the space of a week. Boats from all over the country participate in the event. The Dragon and Squib keelboat classes and many dinghy classes, including Topaz, are raced by club members. The club has turned out many talented sailors. For many years, Glandore has been home to veteran transatlantic yachtsman and sailing author Don Street who continues to participate in local Dragon racing.

== Places of interest ==
Drombeg stone circle is located 2.4 km (1 mi) (1.5 miles) east of Glandore. There is no entry fee for this site.

== Churches ==
There is a Roman Catholic church one mile away on the Rosscarbery side of the village in the townland of Kilfaughnabeg (meaning "Little church of Faughna"). This church was built circa 1929. The building of a church at another location was abandoned before commencement of the construction of the existing church. The abandoned structure was in Killacoosane. Its erection had been undertaken by Fr. John Power, but the project was abandoned after his death.

The Church of Ireland Christ Church is on the Leap side of the village. It was consecrated in 1861. It contains a bell cast by the Murphy foundry in 1889.

== Notable residents ==
- Seán Hayes (1884–1928) was a Sinn Féin TD 1918–1923
- Michael MacWhite (1883–1958), the first Irish permanent delegate to the League of Nations
- Tony O'Reilly, Chryss Goulandris and family, at one time lived at Shorecliffe, a complex of buildings centred on an old guesthouse at which O'Reilly used to stay with his family. Shorecliffe was sold in the 2000s. Baroness Jay of Paddington, aka Margaret Jay has spent part of every year in her house in the village, Elm Bank, for decades.
