= R596 road (Ireland) =

Regional road in Ireland

R596 road
- Bóthar R596
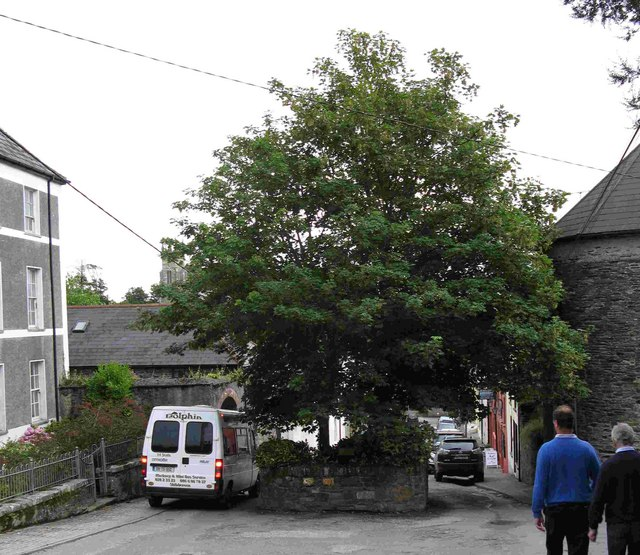
- "The Two Trees", Main Street, Castletownshend, on the R596

Route information
- Length: 7.9 km (4.9 mi)

Major junctions
- From: R595 at The Four Crosses, Skibbereen, County Cork
- To: The Quay, Castletownshend, County Cork

Location
- Country: Ireland

Highway system
- Roads in Ireland; Motorways; Primary; Secondary; Regional
← R595	→ R597

The R596 road is a regional road in County Cork, Ireland. It travels from the R595 road at Skibbereen to Castletownshend. The road is 7.9 kilometres (4.9 mi) long.
