= Ballydehob =

Village in County Cork, Ireland

Ballydehob Béal an Dá Chab
- Village
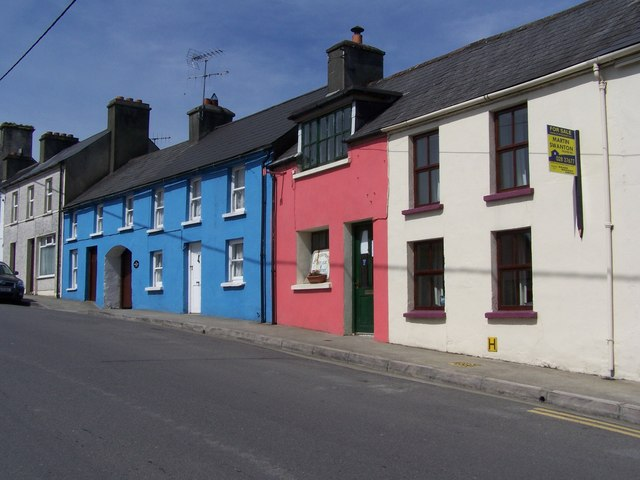
- Main Street

- Location in Ireland
- Coordinates: 51.563°N 9.46°W
- Country: Ireland
- Province: Munster
- County: County Cork
- Barony: Carbery West
- Parish: Schull

Area
  - Total: 4 km^{2} (1.5 sq mi)
  - Land: 3.61 km^{2} (1.39 sq mi)
- Elevation: 10 m (33 ft)

Population (2022)
  - Total: 345
  - Density: 95.6/km^{2} (248/sq mi)
- Time zone: UTC+0 (WET)
  - Summer (DST): UTC-1 (IST (WEST))

Ballydehob (Irish: Béal an Dá Chab, meaning 'mouth of the two river fords') is a coastal village in the southwest of County Cork, Ireland. It is 13 km west of Skibbereen and 13 km south of Bantry.

== History ==
During the Bronze Age (2200-600 B.C.), copper was mined on Mount Gabriel, just west of the village. About the same time, stone circles, wedge and boulder tombs were constructed in the area. The Celts arrived at some later time and in the early historic period, various clans fought for dominance, until the eventual emergence of the McCarthys and O'Mahonys as the rulers of the region. A string of castles was built along the coastline. Kilcoe Castle was the McCarthy's most westerly stronghold and their only coastal foothold. It has since been renovated and rebuilt by its actor owner Jeremy Irons.

In 1602, soldiers led by Sir George Carew, Lord President of Munster, descended on the area in a successful bid to break the power of the Irish clan chieftains. Their passage through West Cork was described in "Pacata Hibernia" by Thomas Stafford from the invaders's point of view. The events were also captured, from a native Irish perspective, in "Historicae Catolicae Iberniae Compendium" by Philip O'Sullivan Beare.

The 17th century saw an influx of settlers mainly from England, as well as a number of Protestants (Huguenots) also fleeing persecution by the Catholic Royal House of Bourbon in France. The Swantons from Norfolk emerged as one of the most prominent Anglo-Irish families in the locality, and by the late 18th century they had succeeded in changing the name of Ballydehob to Swanton's Town. The last known use of the name Swanton's Town was in the census of 1821.

In the 1820s, copper mining developed again in the region. The Cappagh mine was financed by Lord Audley; its 20-metre (66 ft) chimney survived until February 2002, when it was destroyed by a lightning strike. A feature of this mining era was the introduction to Ballydehob of a police constabulary and barracks, approximately 6 years before the first London police force. By the 1840s the population of the area had swelled to nearly 20,000. Then disaster struck when the potato crop failed and the Great Irish Famine resulted (1845-1849). This affected Ballydehob and the whole of West Cork in a most devastating way; thousands died and thousands more emigrated. Between 1841 and 1851 the population of the area fell by 42%, a decline which was much higher than the national average. As of the 2022 census, Ballydehob had a resident population of about 350.

In the 1880s, amid growing agitation over land reform, the Ballydehob branch of the Irish National Land League hosted a visit by Anna Parnell, sister of Charles Stewart Parnell, to address a public meeting on the subject. This was held in the field where St. Brigit's school now stands, and is commemorated by a plaque.

In the 1960s, the Ballydehob area saw an influx of artists, writers and craftspeople, often referred to as 'blow-ins', and for a brief period a number of "hippy" communes were established in the area, latterly dubbed the "Ballydehob Bohemians". One house was decorated with painted flowers, becoming known as the "Flower House". This house, which included a shop, gallery and studios, was originally opened in 1968 by Christa Reichel and Norah Golden who together formed the Ballydehob Artists Ltd.

Ballydehob lies within a tourist area in West Cork and has a number of guest-houses and private holiday homes.

== Festivals ==
Festivals in Ballydehob include the Ballydehob Traditional Music Weekend (an annual traditional music, song, and dance festival), the Ballydehob Jazz Festival, Ballydehob Country Music Festival, Fastnet Maritime and Folk Festival, and West Cork Yoga Festival. The Ballydehob Summer Festival, which takes place in mid-August, includes a "turnip race".

The 'Gathering of the Boats', or Cruinniu na mBad, also takes place annually with families meeting the flotilla of working boats and other traditional sailing vessels at Ballydehob Quay.

Ballydehob Old Time Threshing & Vintage Weekend celebrates the historic traditions of rural Ireland and generally takes place over a weekend in October.

== Transport ==
=== Road ===
The R592 road forms Main Street in village. The R592 joins N71 road by Ballydehob Bridge. By the N71 road, Bantry is 17 km to the north and Skibbereen 15 km to the east.

=== Bus ===
As at 2024 there are a few Bus Éireann services (and occasional Local Link services) to Bantry, Skibbereen and other nearby places.

=== Rail ===
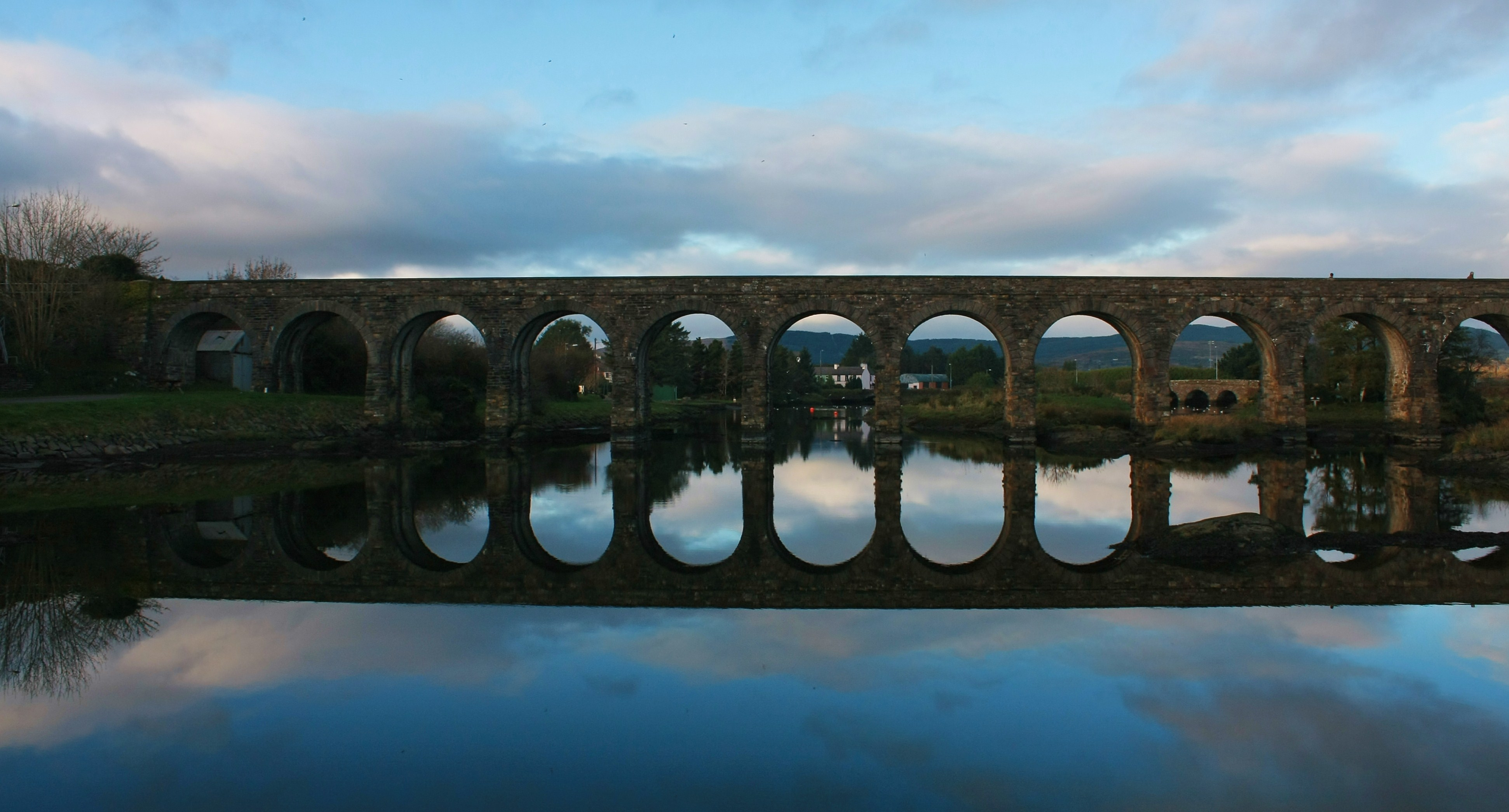
12 Arch Bridge

There is no longer a station in or near Ballydehob. The nearest station is now in Killarney.

On 6 September 1886 Ballydehob railway station opened on the narrow gauge Schull and Skibbereen Railway with a large sports event held in Ballydehob to mark the occasion. At the time there was a 15 m.p.h. speed limit on the railway. The line's 12 arch bridge dominates the Ballydehob estuary. Mounting losses, coal shortages and the arrival of buses and motor cars eventually brought the closure of the line. The final train ran on 27 January 1947 and the station finally closed altogether on 1 June 1953. Ballydehob was the main intermediate station on the railway.

== Notable people ==
- Sinead Cusack and her husband Jeremy Irons, actors, purchased the 13th-century Kilcoe Castle near Ballydehob.
- Fionn Ferreira, inventor and scientist, was born in Ballydehob.
- Danno O'Mahony, wrestler who won the NWA World Championship in June 1935. Known as the "Irish Whip", in reference to his throwing technique, he was also a champion hammer thrower. One of the village's pubs, "The Irish Whip", is named after him, and a bronze statue was erected in his honour in the town in 2000.
- Kay Summersby, who served as chauffeur and personal assistant for General Dwight D. Eisenhower while he was Supreme Commander of the Allied Expeditionary Force in London, was born at Insh Beg house (about 20 km from Ballydehob) in 1908.

== Twin towns – sister cities ==
Ballydehob is twinned with the town of Cléden-Cap-Sizun in France.

== See also ==
- List of towns and villages in Ireland
