= R592 road (Ireland) =

Road in Ireland

Coordinates: 51.545368°N 9.498454°W

R592 road
- Bóthar R592
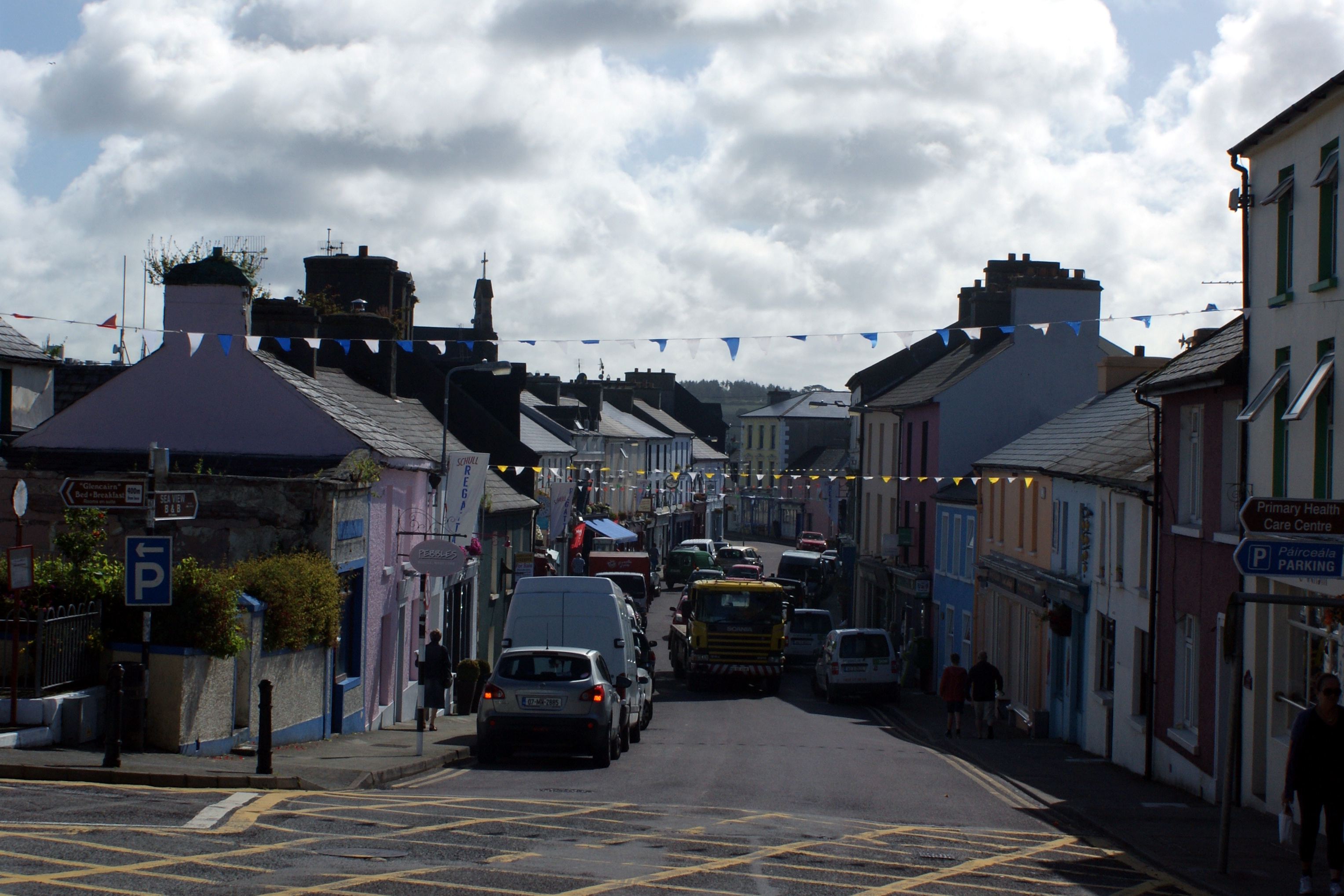
- Schull Main Street, part of the R592

Route information
- Length: 16.7 km (10.4 mi)

Major junctions
- From: R591 Toormore
- Passes through Schull; Passes Derreennatra Bog NHA
- To: N71 Ballydehob

Location
- Country: Ireland

Highway system
- Roads in Ireland; Motorways; Primary; Secondary; Regional

The R592 road is a regional road in Ireland, located in County Cork.
