= Ballinhassig =

Village in County Cork, Ireland

Ballinhassig Béal Átha an Cheasaigh
- Village
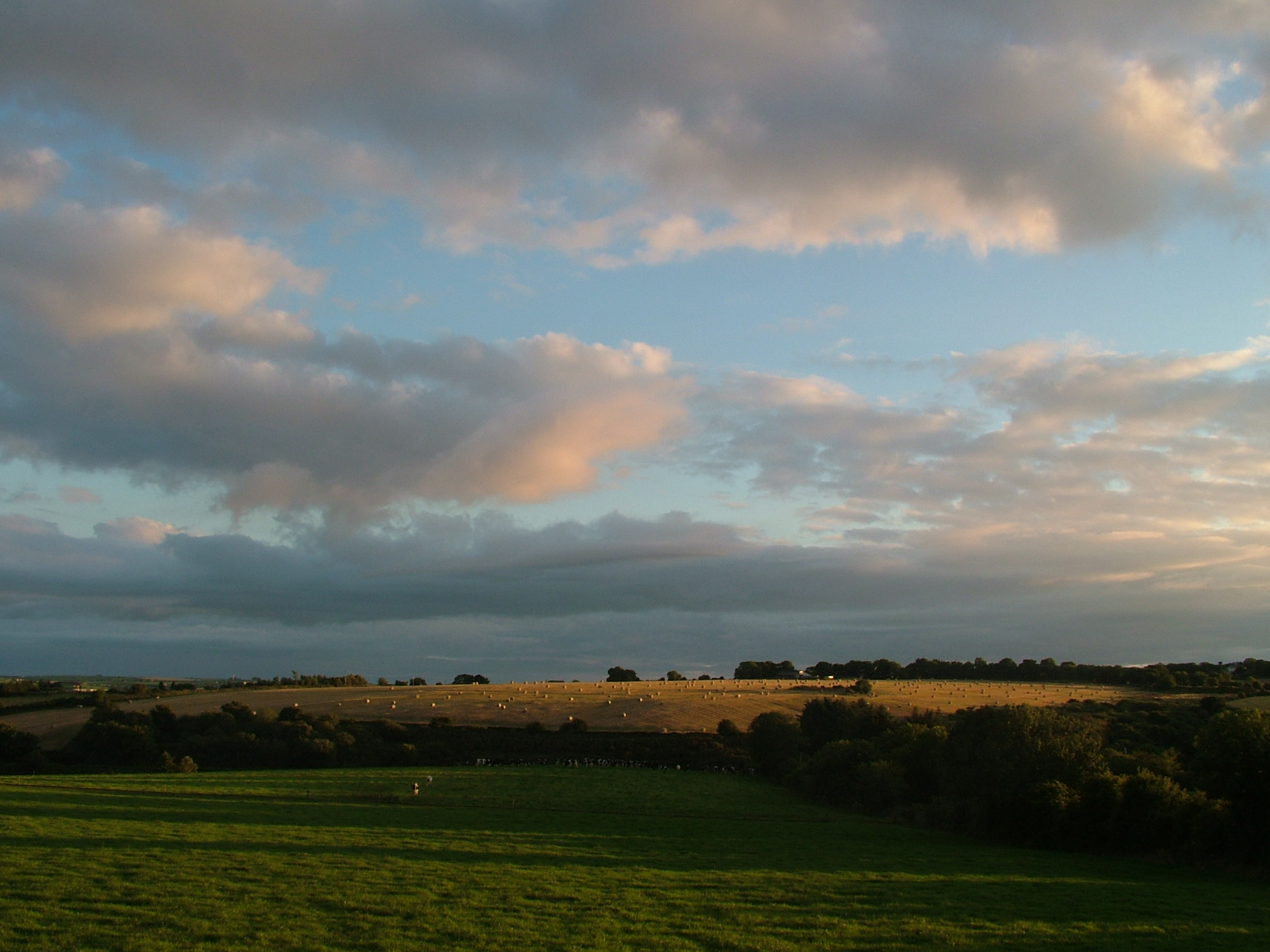
- Countryside near Ballinhassig

- Location in Ireland
- Coordinates: 51°49′N 8°32′W
- Country: Ireland
- Province: Munster
- County: County Cork
- Time zone: UTC+0 (WET)
  - Summer (DST): UTC-1 (IST (WEST))
- Area code: 021

Ballinhassig (Irish: Béal Átha an Cheasaigh) is a village in County Cork, Ireland. It is 11 km (7 mi) south of the centre of Cork city just off the N71 Bandon road, and near the source of the River Owenabue (Abhainn Bui, meaning "Yellow River").

Traditionally an agricultural area, Ballinhassig has seen some growth as a commuter area, being close to Cork city. This growth saw the construction of new houses during the Irish construction boom of the early 21st century.

== History ==
There are a number of prehistoric ringforts around Ballinhassig.

Mountjoy, the Lord Deputy of Ireland, camped locally with his army of 4,000 troops on the night before the Battle of Kinsale in 1601.

On 30 June 1845, 11 people (10 men and 1 woman) were reportedly killed by the Royal Irish Constabulary during a riot in the village.

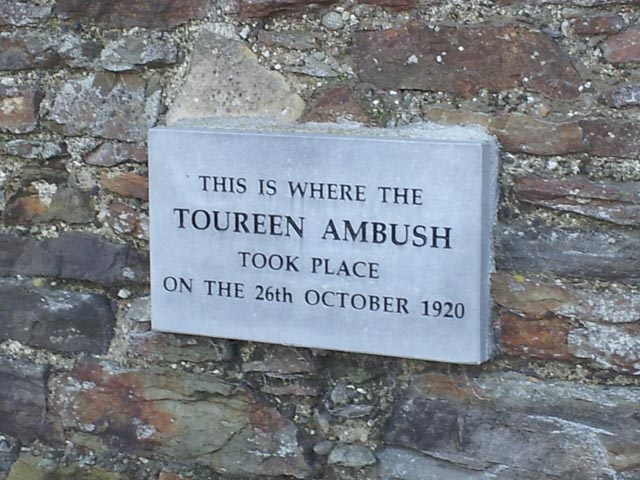
Plaque commemorating the Toureen ambush

During the War of Independence there were a number of actions in the area, including on 3 February 1921, when the 3rd Cork Brigade of the Irish Republican Army ambushed and killed three British soldiers on the Tulligbeg side of the village in what was known as the Toureen ambush. Two soldiers of the Essex Regiment died there; Lt Dixon and Pte Charles Reid, Sergeant Thomas Bennet died of wounds the next day. That night, British soldiers retaliated by burning much of the village and homes in the Ballinaboy area, and arresting and imprisoning a number of local citizens.

== Amenities ==
There are three primary schools in Ballinhassig (Ballyheada NS, Goggins Hill NS and Ballygarvan), several public houses, a number of shops, three churches, a Marian Hall, and a co-op.

A steam rally club is situated in Halfway, 2.5 km from Ballinhassig village, a village so named as it is halfway between Cork and Bandon.

Ballinhassig GAA has a senior hurling team and was founded in 1886.

The Marian Hall in Ballinhassig is used as a training venue for a local taekwondo club. There is also a soccer club in Ballinhassig called Ballinhassig AFC.

== Transport ==
The Gogginshill Tunnel at Ballinhassig, opened in 1851, is now the longest abandoned railway tunnel in the Republic of Ireland. It was a part of the Cork, Bandon and South Coast Railway. Ballinhassig railway station itself was opened on 1 August 1849, and closed on 1 April 1961.

== See also ==
- List of towns and villages in Ireland
