= Halfway, County Cork =

Village in County Cork, Ireland

Halfway Irish: Leath Slighe
- Village
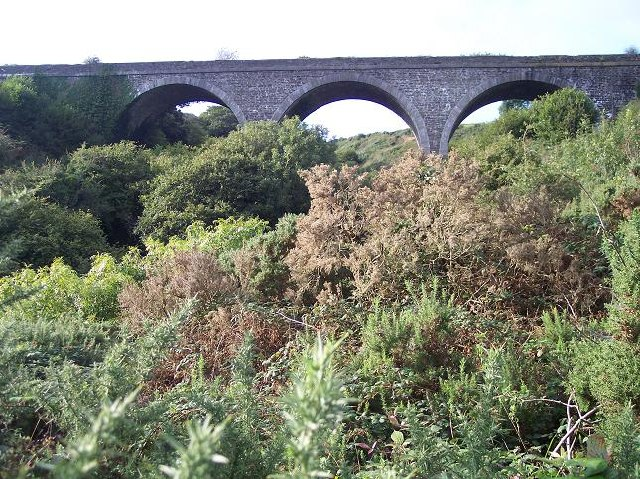
- The Halfway Viaduct, on the former Cork, Bandon and South Coast Railway, sits above the village

- Location in Ireland
- Coordinates: 51°48′07″N 8°34′25″W
- Country: Ireland
- Province: Munster
- County: Cork

Population (2022)
  - Total: 252
- Time zone: UTC+0 (WET)
  - Summer (DST): UTC-1 (IST (WEST))
- Irish Grid Reference: W605615

Halfway (Irish: Leath Slighe) is a village in County Cork, in Ireland. Halfway got its name from being situated approximately halfway between Cork City and Bandon.

Halfway is situated on the L2231, just off the N71, close to the neighbouring village of Ballinhassig. Ballinhassig Garda station is located in Halfway. There is also an angling shop.

The annual Halfway Vintage Rally, a meeting of vintage car owners and enthusiasts, takes place over one weekend in September. Road bowling is sometimes played on the national road between the villages of Halfway and Ballinhassig.

Evidence of ancient settlement in the area includes several ringforts in the neighbouring townlands of Gortnaclogh, Annagh Beg and Rathroe.

== See also ==
- List of towns and villages in Ireland
