= Crookhaven =

Seaside village in County Cork, Ireland

Crookhaven An Cruachán
- Town
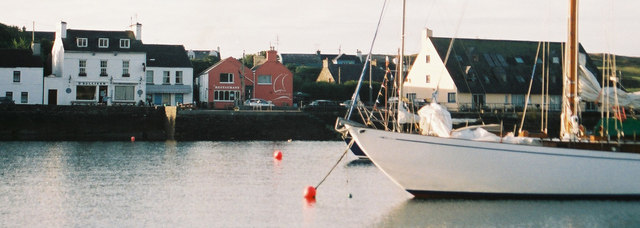
- Waterfront in Crookhaven

- Location in Ireland
- Coordinates: 51°27′47″N 9°43′13″W
- Country: Ireland
- Province: Munster
- County: County Cork

Area
  - Total: 2.57 km^{2} (0.99 sq mi)
- Elevation: 11 m (36 ft)

Population (2011)
  - Total: 59
  - Density: 23/km^{2} (59/sq mi)
- Time zone: UTC+0 (WET)
  - Summer (DST): UTC+1 (IST (WEST))
- Irish Grid Reference: V805255
- Website: www.crookhaven.ie
- Crookhaven Lighthouse
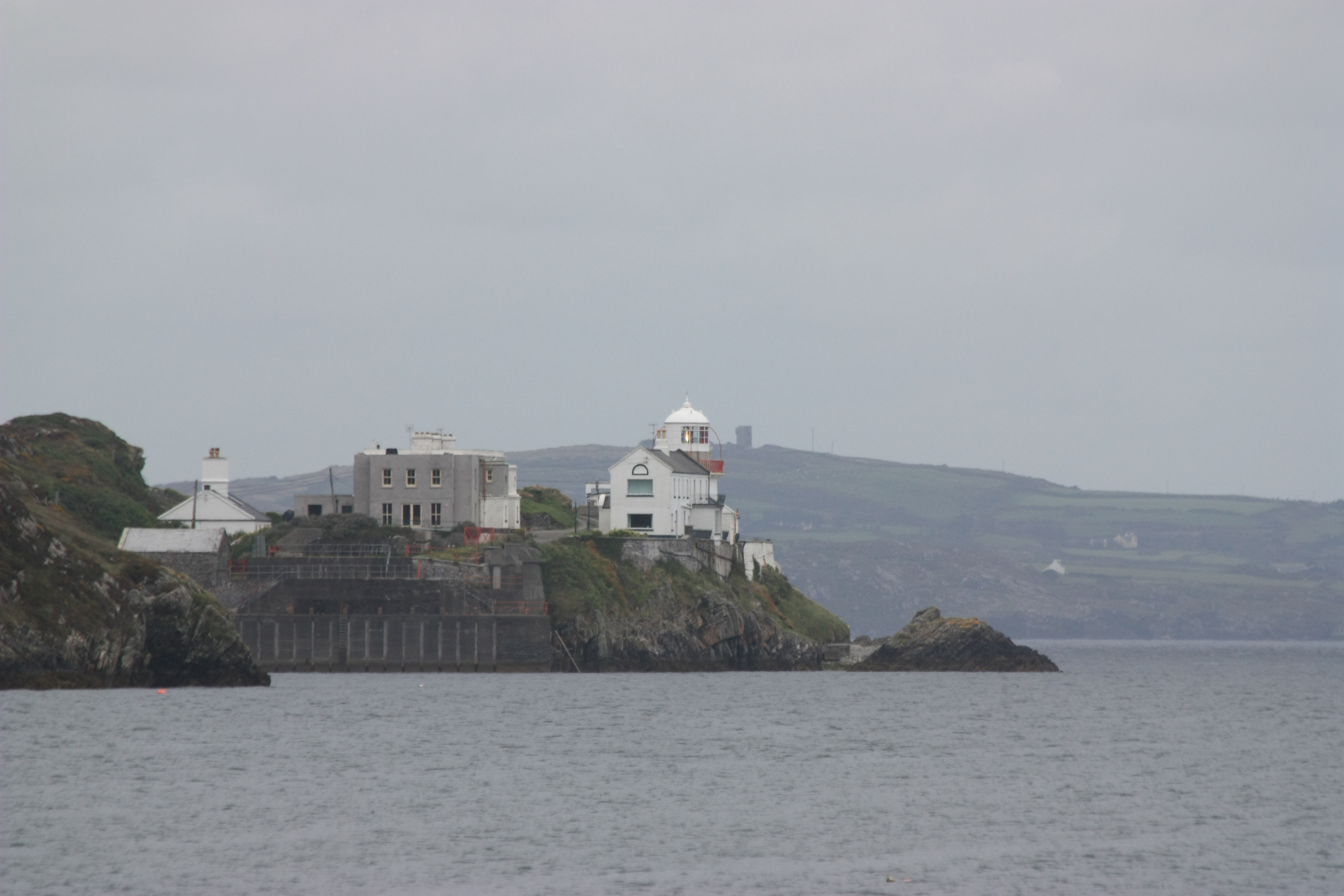
- Crookhaven Lighthouse
- Coordinates: 51.476470°N 9.704744°W
- Constructed: 1843
- Construction: masonry tower
- Height: 14 metres (46 ft)
- Shape: cylindrical tower with balcony and lantern
- Markings: white tower and lantern
- Power source: mains electricity
- Operator: Crookhaven Lighthouse
- Focal height: 20 metres (66 ft)
- Lens: 3rd order dioptric lens
- Range: White: 13 nautical miles (24 km; 15 mi); Red: 11 nautical miles (20 km; 13 mi)
- Characteristic: LFl WR 8s.
- Ireland no.: CIL-2570

Crookhaven (Irish: An Cruachán) is a village in County Cork, Ireland, on the most southwestern tip of the island of Ireland. With an out-of-season population of about sixty, it swells in the summer season to about four hundred, when the occupants of the seasonal holiday homes arrive.

== History ==
The village name is attributed to an association with the Crooke family, and initially with Sir Thomas Crooke, 1st Baronet who also founded Baltimore, County Cork about 1610. The Crooke family were granted large estates in west Cork in the early 17th century, but their association with the area ended around 1665, on the death of Sir Thomas's son and heir Sir Samuel. In the late 1500s and early 1600s the village was used as a base for piracy - where not only the local justices (including the vice-admiral of Munster) but the broader population were involved. These activities were unaffected by official discouragement under King James VI and I, but the Dutch attack on Crookhaven in 1614 did significant damage and piracy in the region declined thereafter.

The village was an important port of call for merchant shipping between Europe and the United States, and many inhabitants were in the business of supplying the ships as they sheltered in Crookhaven after or before a long voyage. In 1959 Crookhaven was the subject of a film by the English filmmaker James Clarke in his film Irish Village. At that time the film records the population of the town and local farms as being 69.

Crookhaven was also used by Guglielmo Marconi as a location for experiments in wireless communication and ship-to-shore communication. Some of these tests and experiments took place between the Fastnet lighthouse, Crookhaven, and Cape Clear Island - since they were so closely connected. The area was useful for these purposes as a fixed telegraph line also connected Crookhaven and Cape Clear Island - located eight miles away. Marconi worked here from 1901 until 1914 when he sold the rights. The station was ultimately destroyed in 1922.

== Amenities ==
The village has three pubs and also has a shop and post office.

As with certain other amenities, the Crookhaven Harbour Sailing Club also only opens in the summer.

== Places of interest ==
The road to the village comes from Goleen and curves around the harbour. As one drives from Goleen, one passes a road to the left leading onto Rock Island. Originally this was the site of a coast guard station - which replaced an earlier station to its south. The "new" station was occupied from 1907 until 1921. During the Irish War of Independence, British forces were stationed there to protect the station and nearby signal station at Brow Head. In August 1920, the IRA raided the Brow Head station and it was subsequently destroyed. Also on Rock Island was a fishery plant. From here most of the shellfish of Ireland was exported to Europe. The ponds were open until the late 1970s, then it became a food processing plant packaging garlic butter and mussels - but since fell derelict.

== Transport & communications ==
The village is located in south-western Ireland, 132 kilometres (82 mi) from Cork and 383 kilometres (238 mi) from Dublin. The nearest airport to Crookhaven is Cork Airport, and the regional road R591 ends in the village. Crookhaven has no scheduled public transport.

== Notable people ==
Jeremiah Coghlan, naval captain in the French Revolutionary and Napoleonic Wars, "an officer almost unrivaled in heroic exploits".

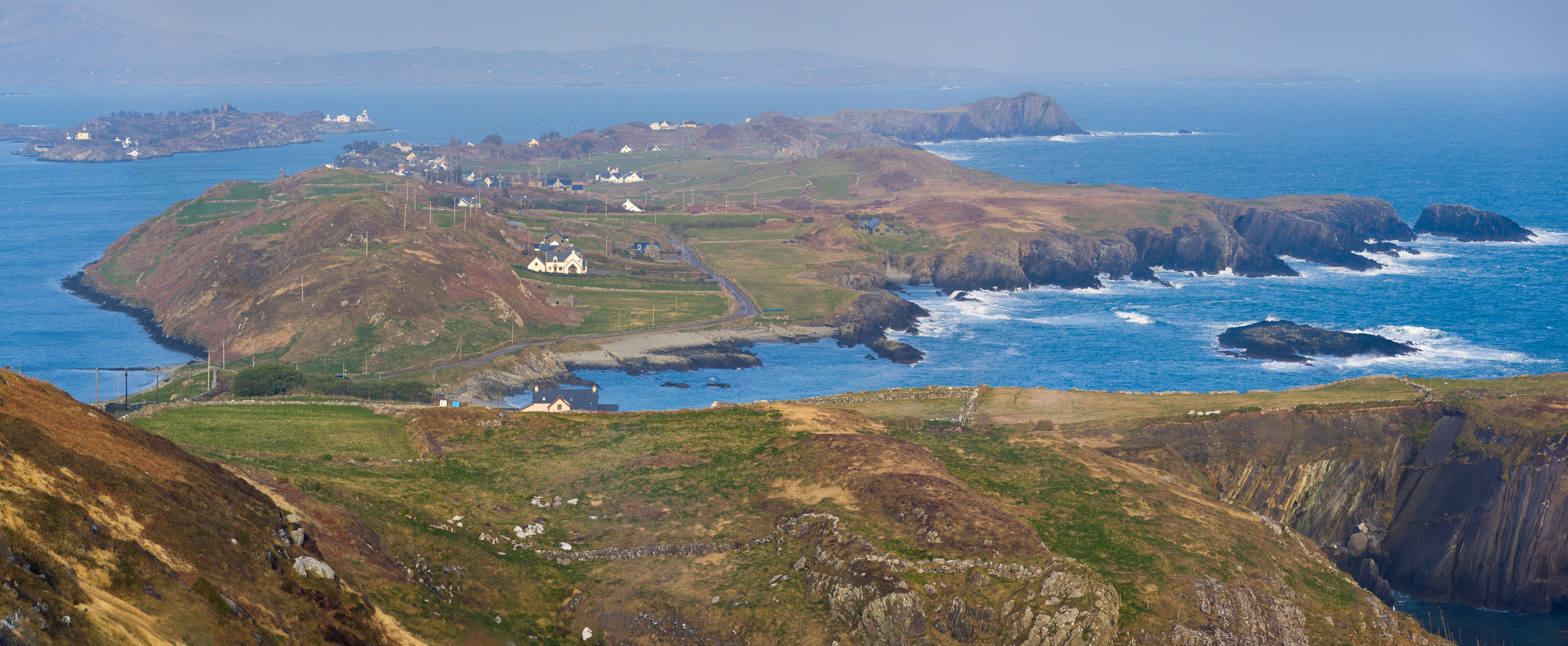
Panorama of Crookhaven and the peninsula it is located on, taken from the heights west of it.

== See also ==
- Lighthouses in Ireland
- List of towns and villages in Ireland
