= Drimoleague =

Village in County Cork, Ireland

Drimoleague Droim Dhá Liag
- Village
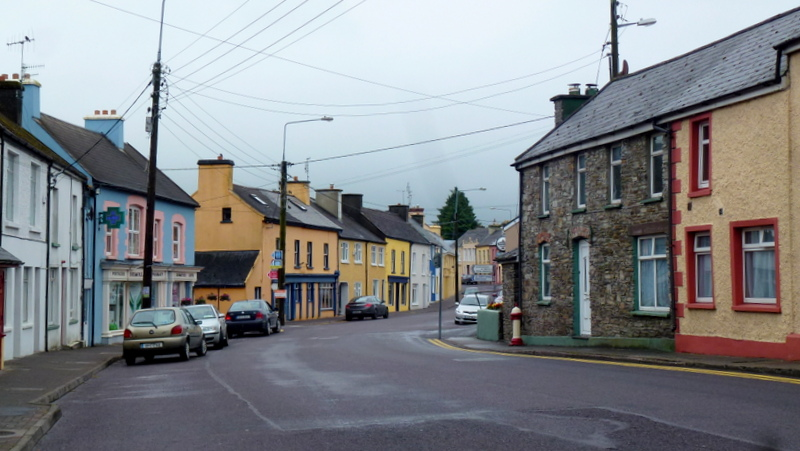
- Main Street

- Location in Ireland
- Coordinates: 51°39′35″N 09°15′39″W
- Country: Ireland
- Province: Munster
- County: County Cork
- District: Skibbereen

Population (2022)
  - Total: 486
- Time zone: UTC+0 (WET)
  - Summer (DST): UTC-1 (IST (WEST))
- Irish Grid Reference: W128460

Drimoleague (historically Drumdalege, Irish: Droim Dhá Liag, meaning 'ridge of two stones') is a village on the R586 road at its junction with the R593 in County Cork, Ireland. It lies roughly halfway between the towns of Dunmanway and Bantry, within the civil parish of Dromdaleague. As of the 2022 census of Ireland, Drimoleague had 486 residents.

== History ==
Drimoleague is located in West Cork in the townlands of Baurnahulla and Dromdaleague. Evidence of ancient settlement within these townlands includes a number of ecclesiastical, souterrain, holy well and fulacht fia sites. Other archaeological sites include the Clodagh Standing Stones, a Stone Age site, which lies 4.8 kilometres (3.0 mi) to the northeast. Castle Donovan, a ruined Irish tower house, is situated approximately 4 kilometres (2.5 mi) to the north.

Drimoleague is the start for one of the five Pilgrim Paths of Ireland, St. Finbar's Pilgrim Path, which ends 35-kilometers away in Gougane Barra. A Church of Ireland (COI) church which was built in 1790, is now in ruin. St. Matthew's, dedicated in 1858, located to the east of the village is the current COI church.The local Methodist church was built c. 1870. In 1956, a new Catholic church was completed on the site of an older church. Designed by architect Frank Murphy, it is credited as being West Cork's first building in the modernist style.

Drimoleague railway station opened in 1877 on the Cork, Bandon and South Coast Railway line. It closed in the early 1960s.

The TV series Holding, based on the similarly titled book by Graham Norton, was filmed in the village and surrounding area in 2021.

== Demographics ==
As of the 2022 census, the village of Drimoleague had a usually resident population of 482. Of these, 74.1% identified as White Irish, 0.8% as White Irish Travellers and 11.0% as other white ethnicities. A further 1.9% identified as Black or Black Irish, 4.1% as Asian or Asian Irish. Approximately 8% of the population were of other ethnicities or did not state their ethnicity.

== Amenities ==
Local amenities include two public houses, a pitch & putt course, tennis courts, and a children's playground. The local national (primary) school, Drimoleague National School, had an enrollment of 59 pupils as of 2021. Clann na nGael GAA club has facilities at Páirc Tadhg Na Samhna in Drimoleague.

== Gallery ==
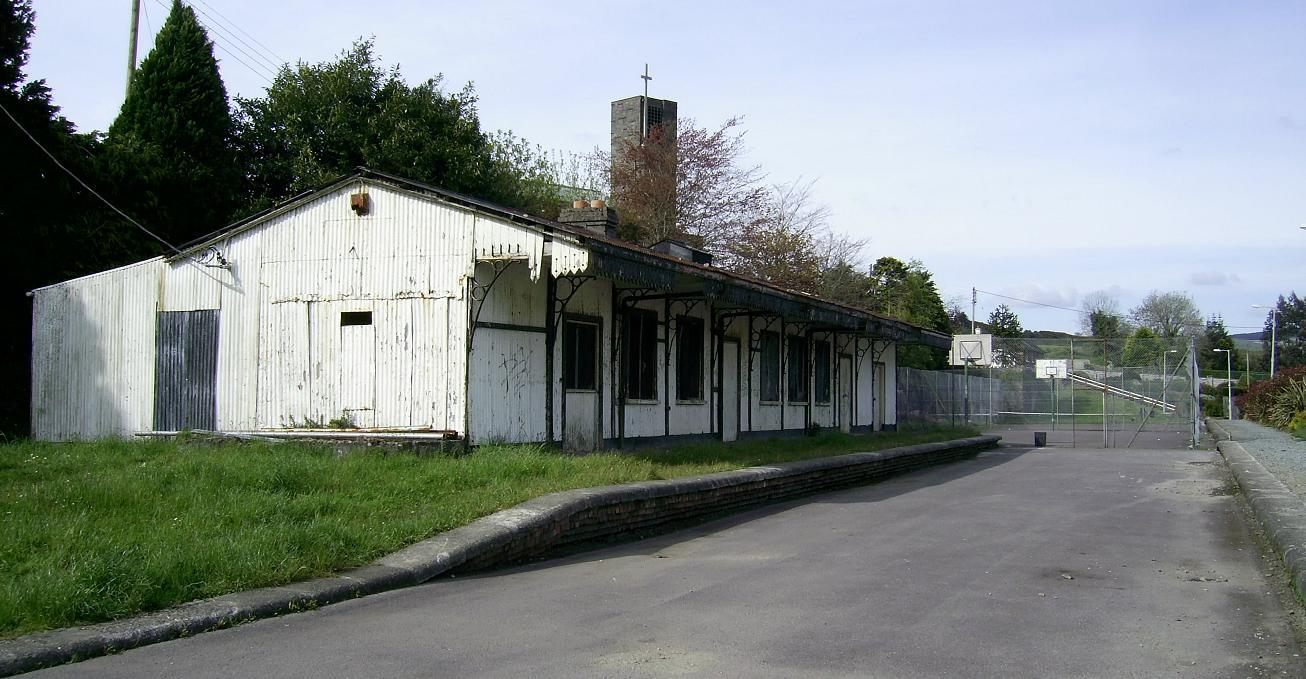
Former railway station that led to the foundation of Drimoleague

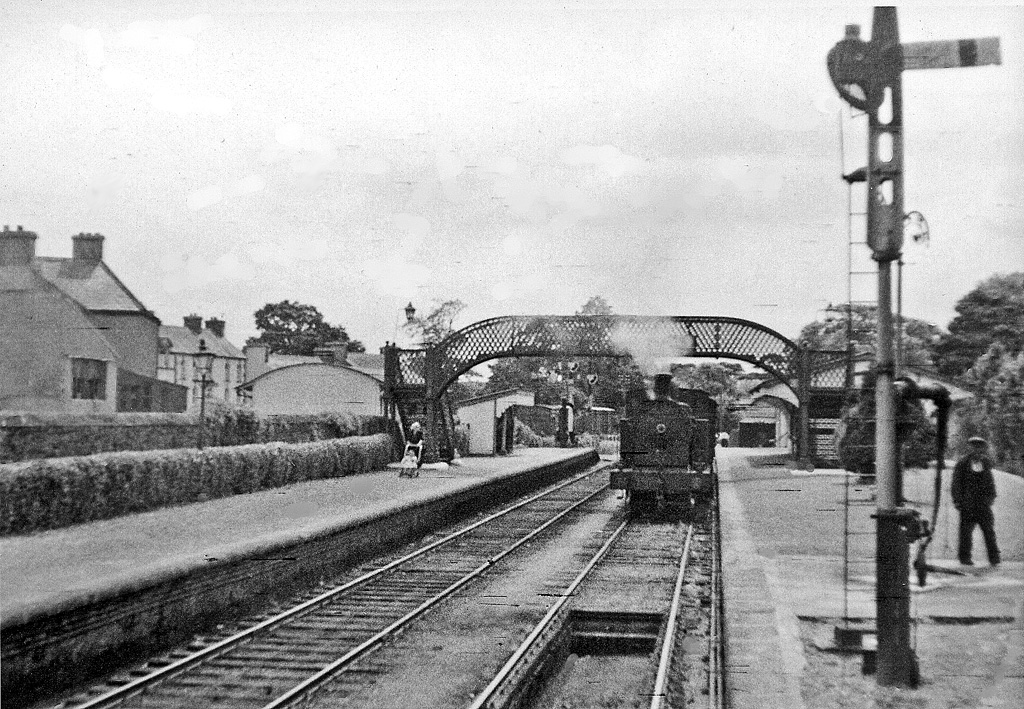
Drimoleague railway station in 1955
