= Brow Head =

Brow Head Ceann Bró
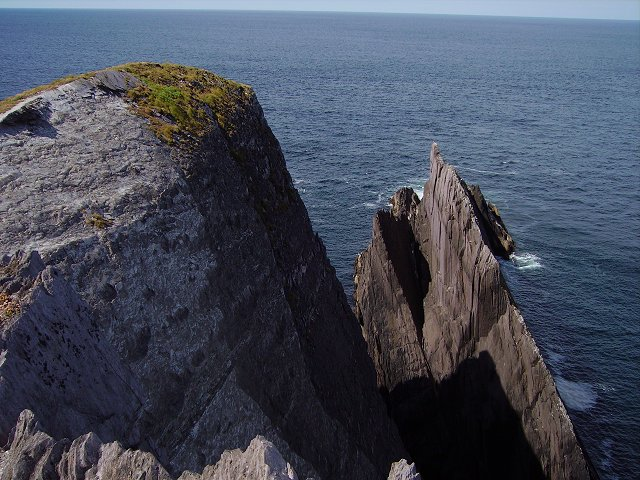
- Etymology: Irish bró, "millstone"
- Location within Ireland
- Coordinates: 51°26′52″N 9°46′20″W
- Country: Ireland
- County: Cork

Brow Head (Irish: Ceann Bró) is the most southerly point of mainland Ireland. It is in the rural townland of Mallavoge near Crookhaven in County Cork, Ireland. It is 3.8 kilometres (2.4 mi) east of Mizen Head at latitude 51.43ºN.

== History ==
Ptolemy's Geography (2nd century AD) described a point called Νοτιον (Notion, "southern promontory") which referred to Brow Head. Evidence of ancient settlement on the headland includes a ringfort and possible promontory fort site in Mallavoge townland.

Also located in the townland is a ruined three-storey signal tower, built in 1804 following an attempted French attempted invasion of Bantry, to defend against further potential incursions.

Copper mining took place at Brow Head during the 19th century and evidence of mines and miners' houses remain. The first copper ore was extracted here in 1852 and mining continued intermittently until c. 1906.

The ruins of an early 20th century Marconi station are also on the headland. The Brow Head station was raided and destroyed by a local detachment of the Irish Republican Army, during the Irish War of Independence in August 1920.

In 2016, Brow Head was used as a filming location for Star Wars: The Last Jedi.
