= Goleen =

Village in County Cork, Ireland

Goleen An Góilín
- Village
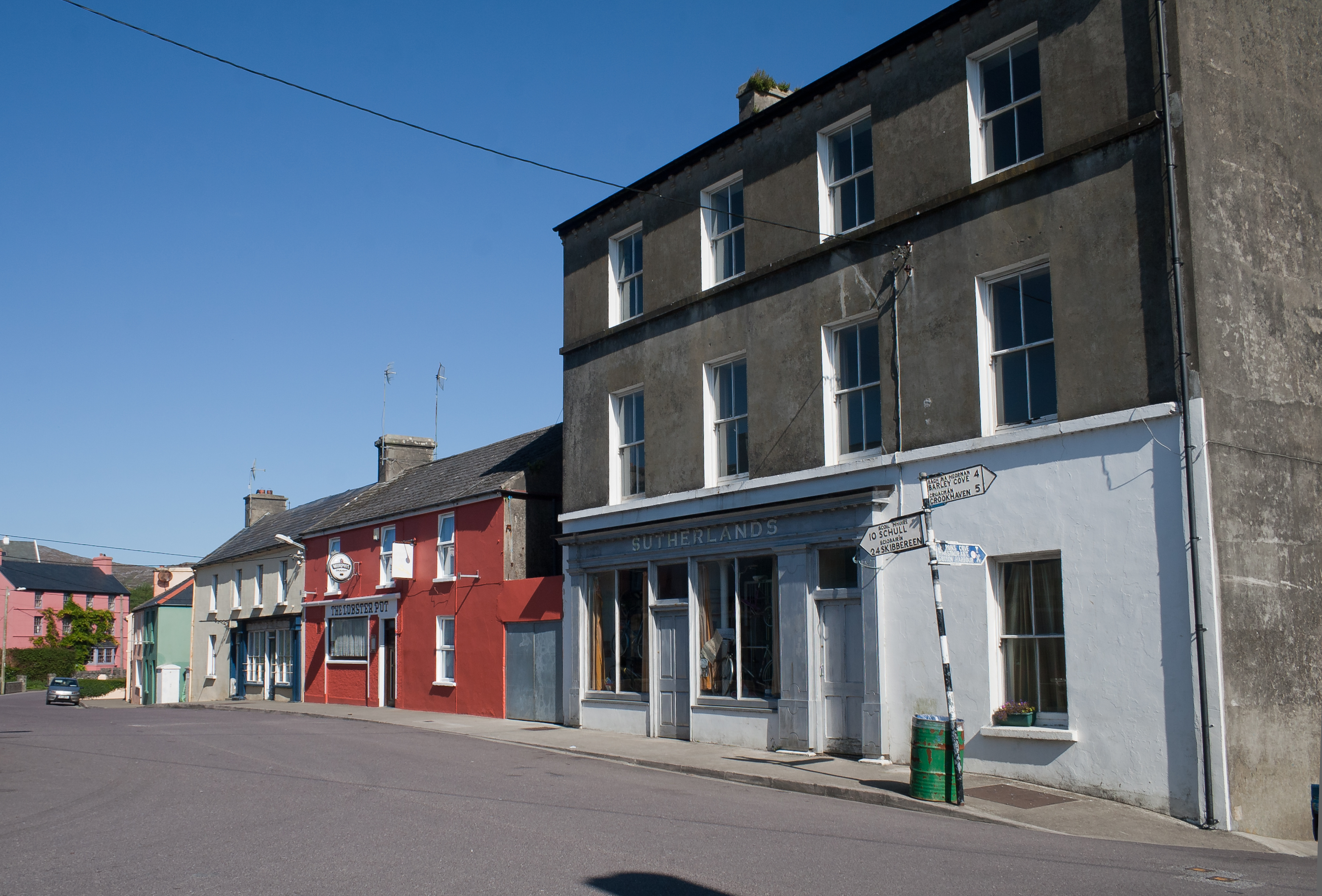
- Main Street

- Location in Ireland
- Coordinates: 51°29′42″N 09°42′41″W
- Country: Ireland
- Province: Munster
- County: County Cork
- District: Schull
- Time zone: UTC+0 (WET)
  - Summer (DST): UTC-1 (IST (WEST))

Goleen (Irish: An Góilín) is a small rural village in County Cork on the south-western tip of Ireland. Farming, tourism and construction work are among the main occupations of the local people.

== Location ==
Goleen is located towards the south-western end of the Mizen Peninsula, in West Cork. The land surrounding the village is unsuitable for farming, being hilly and rocky with limited soil cover.

The nearest town is Schull, 12 km to the east (15 km by road, along the R591).

Mizen Head, at the southern tip of the Mizen peninsula, about five miles from the village, is often claimed to be the most southerly point on the island of Ireland, but is in fact the country's most southwesterly point. The distinction of being Ireland's most southerly point belongs to nearby Brow Head, from where Guglielmo Marconi experimented with transatlantic radio signals at the beginning of the 20th century.

== Amenities ==
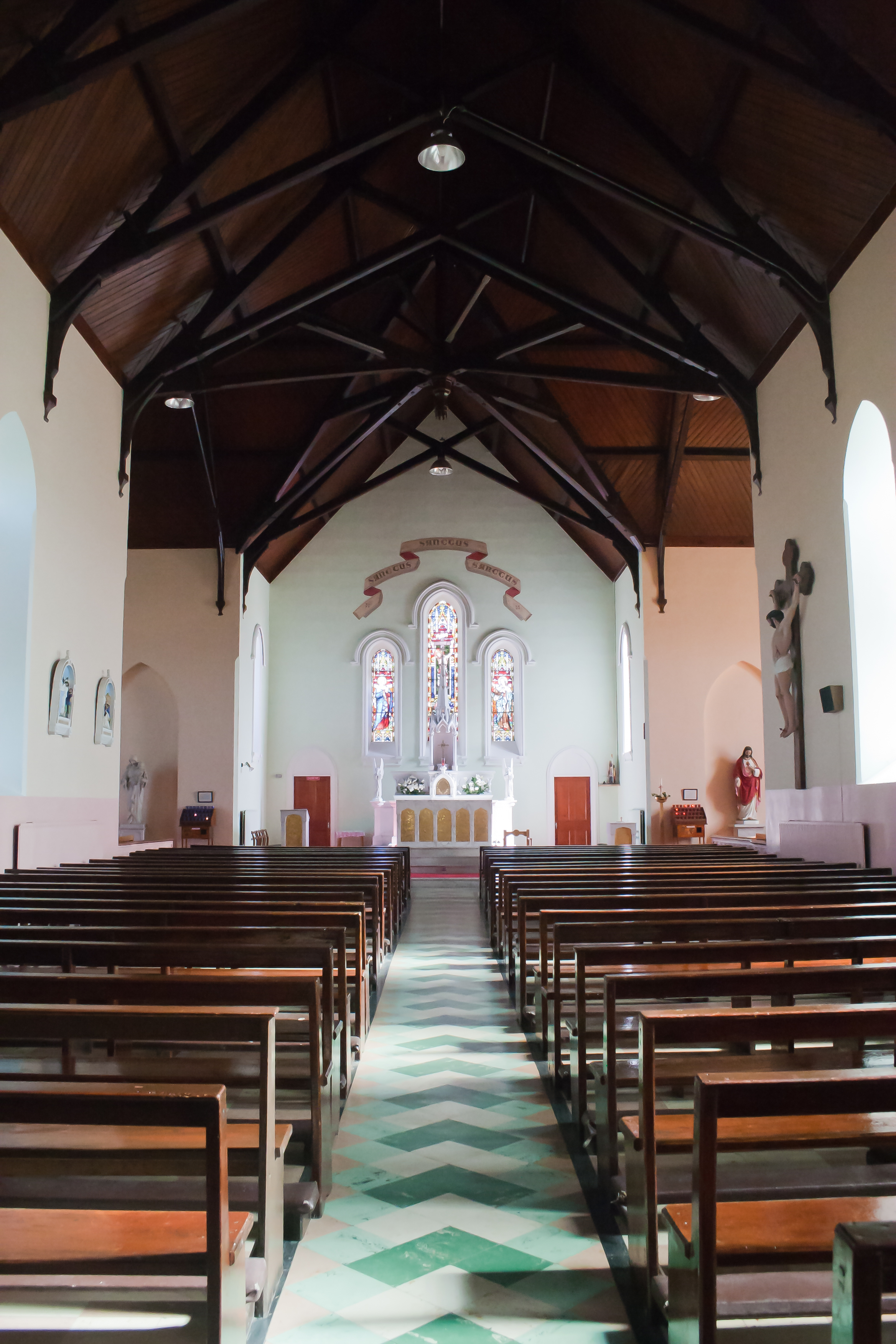
Nave of the parish church, dedicated to Our Lady, Star of the Sea and St. Patrick

The village has four pubs, a small shop, and a petrol station.

The town also has a community pitch on which locals play Gaelic football and soccer. In the sports hall beside the pitch is a table tennis club.

The village has a large Roman Catholic church; there is a smaller Church of Ireland church situated just outside the village but this has been deconsecrated and is the site for a sail-maker.

In 1852, shortly after the famine, the parish priest John Foley started to build a new parish church with the help of donations by Irish emigrants. The church was erected in the Neo-Gothic style with a cruciform aisleless ground plan, four bays, and a triplet window in the chancel behind the high altar. Bishop William Delaney of the diocese of Cork consecrated the church on 11 October 1854.

== Transport ==
Bus Éireann run the 237 bus service from Cork city to Goleen.
