= N71 road (Ireland) =

Road in Ireland

N71 road
- Bóthar N71
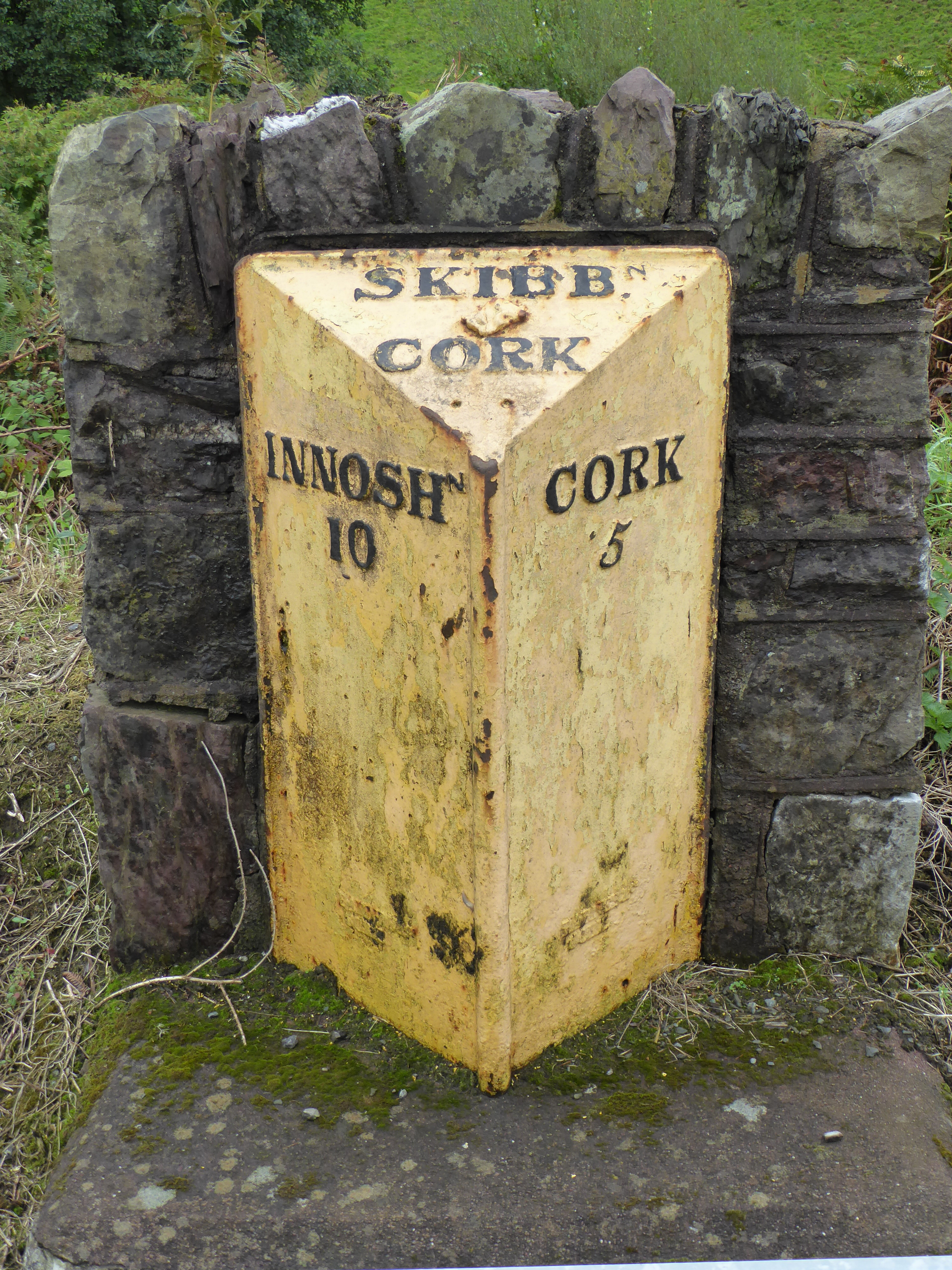
- Milestone on N71 between Cork and Innishannon

Route information
- Length: 187.270 km (116.364 mi)

Location
- Country: Ireland
- Primary destinations: County Cork; Cork; Innishannon; Bandon; Clonakilty; Rosscarbery; Skibbereen; Bantry; Glengarriff; County Kerry; Kenmare; Killarney; (Terminates at N72)

Highway system
- Roads in Ireland; Motorways; Primary; Secondary; Regional

The N71 road is a national secondary road traversing counties Cork and Kerry in Ireland. Towns and villages along the route, westward from Cork city, include Innishannon, Bandon, Clonakilty, Skibbereen, Bantry and Glengarriff in County Cork. Continuing westwards from Glengarriff into County Kerry, the route passes Kenmare and terminates at Killarney.

== Road standard ==
The road is mostly single carriageway, with wider sections towards the Cork end of the route. There are wide sections with climbing/passing lanes, including a rare configuration with a passing lane on both sides, and a dual carriageway section approaching Cork.

As of the early 21st century, there were plans to construct a dual carriageway along the section of roadway between the existing 1970s dual carriageway and the N40 South Ring Road in Cork.

== Improvements ==
In the mid 1990s, a new section of road was constructed between Ballinhassig and Halfway, by-passing the village of Halfway. The older replaced section of the N71 was redesignated as the part of the R613. Other features of this improvement scheme replaced old sections of the road between Cork City and Ballinhassig, with the old sections now forming parts of the local road network. This new section included an overtaking lane for both sides of the road. A flyover was also constructed for the N71 - R613 junction.

Another mid-1990s improvement was completed between Innishannon and Bandon, where the road was widened and hard-shoulders were added.

In 2003, a bypass section was opened on the N71 at Skibbereen.

== Route ==
From Cork, the N71 diverges from the Bandon Road Roundabout at junction 3 of the N40. After approximately 2 kilometres, it becomes a dual carriageway for a distance of approximately 2 kilometres (1.2 mi). It then continues to Innishannon and Bandon. From there, after the roundabout with the R586, there's a short 2+1 road section. Then, the N71 goes through Ballinascarthy, passing a statue of a Ford Model T. At Clonakilty there is a junction with the R600. The N71 then leads to Rosscarberry, where it bypasses the town centre. After passing through Connonagh, the N71 passes through Leap town centre. After approximately 9 km, the N71 gets to Skibbereen, where there is a junction (roundabout) with the R595. Then it goes aside the River Ilen, reaching Ballydehob after approximately 15 km. There is the junction with the R592 which leads to Schull and Goleen. Next, the N71 leads to Bantry within approximately 17 km. After that, the N71 goes to Ballylickey, where there is a junction with the R584. Then the N71 goes to Glengarriff where there is the junction with the R572. After Glenglarrif, the N71 crosses the border between County Cork and County Kerry and leads to Bonane and onwards to Kenmare. On the outskirts of the town is the junction with the N70 which leads to Cahersiveen and Tralee. Finally, the N71 goes to Killarney, where it terminates. The N71 terminates at a roundabout with the N72 which travels westwards to Kilorglin and eastwards to Mallow and Dungarvan in County Waterford.

== See also ==
- Roads in Ireland
- Motorways in Ireland
- National primary road
- Regional road
