= Donal II O'Donovan =

Irish chieftain

Domhnall II Ó Donnabháin
- Lord of Clancahill, The O'Donovan
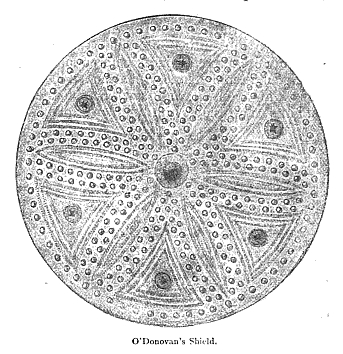
- Born: circa 1560, Castle Donovan
- Died: 1639, Rahine Manor
- Buried: Timoleague Abbey
- Family: O'Donovan
- Father: Donal of the Skins
- Mother: Ellen O'Leary

Donal II O'Donovan (Irish: Domhnall Ó Donnabháin), The O'Donovan of Clann Cathail, Lord of Clancahill (c. 1560 – 1639), was the son of Ellen O'Leary, daughter of O'Leary of Carrignacurra, and Donal of the Skins, The O'Donovan of Clann Cathail. He is most commonly referred to as Donnell O'Donevane of Castledonovan in contemporary references of his time.

His elder brother Diarmaid O'Donovan was slain by Donal Cam O'Sullivan Beare in 1581 following a raid urged by Elizabeth I into O'Sullivan territory. Donal is credited with taking the leadership of Clan Cathail following the death of his father, and was inaugurated and granted the White Rod by the MacCarthy Reagh, his father-in-law Owen MacCarthy Reagh, Prince of Carbery, in 1584. He was then later recognized by the Lord Chancellor Adam Loftus in 1592, defeating an attempt by his younger brother Teige, who alleged Donal to be a bastard, to depose him. He was the last of his line so inaugurated in the ancient Gaelic manner.

Following his adherence to Philip III of Spain during the Nine Years' War, in 1608 Donal surrendered his territory to James I of England, receiving a regrant of the entire estate to himself personally in 1615. A series of inquisitions from 1599 to 1636 show his to have been the greatest land holdings during that period in Carbery after the territories of the MacCarthy princes, although how this came about is a matter of some controversy.

== Inauguration and lawsuit ==
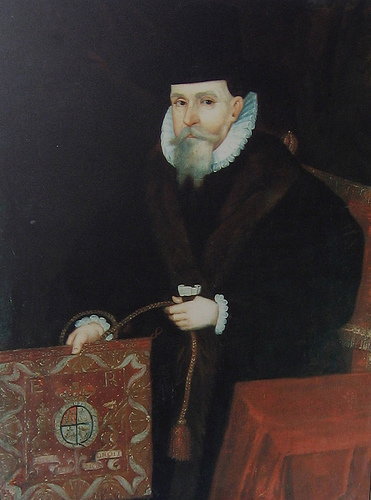
Lord Chancellor Loftus

Donal II's inauguration in 1584 by his father-in-law Owen MacCarthy Reagh is testified to in a complicated lawsuit filed essentially against the both of them by O'Donovan's younger brother Teige sometime previous to 12 February 1592. The suit was concurrent with the anticipated surrender of the sept lands by Donnel O'Donovane (with similar surrender of other sept lands being undertaken by other chiefs, namely Conoghor O'Kallaghane, Conoghor O'Mahoney and Teig M'Owen Carty) in exchange of a regrant of the lands into the personal estate property of the respective chief by patent. The surviving court document from that date contains a summary of the case and the decision of the Lord Chancellor Adam Loftus on the matter. In the suit Teige alleges that Donal was born before his father Donal I and mother Ellen O'Leary were married, and thus that he was in fact (according to Teige) illegitimate or a bastard and had no rights to the Lordship of Clancahill, with Teige even questioning whether Donal was a son of his father, Donal of the Hides, at all.

According to Teige, Donal owed his entire position to Owen MacCarthy Reagh, a man of great wealth and influence and to whose daughter Joane was joined in marriage, and who Teige alleges was not himself even the legitimate MacCarthy Reagh (Prince of Carbery) but an "intruder", the rightful ruler supposedly being Donal of the Pipes, Owen's nephew. Loftus decided in Donal II O'Donovan and MacCarthy Reagh's favour, declaring them legitimate and rightful, with Teige getting nothing, however it is possible there were related events back in Carbery because Owen was deposed by his nephew later that year. MacCarthy Reagh was not popular in all circles, and influencing Loftus' decision was the testimony of another son-in-law, O'Donovan's brother-in-law Sir Fineen O'Driscoll, who was widely popular with the English and Crown government. O'Driscoll bore witness that O'Donovan "was born many years after the marriage [of his mother and father] solemnised at Dromale".

Scholars of Gaelic Ireland frequently mention or refer to the case. First of all, it substantiates the report made a century later by Sir Richard Cox, 1st Baronet in 1690 that the O'Donovans were considered one of the four families in Carbery of royal extraction, because the White Rod or slat, mentioned in the case as received by O'Donovan from MacCarthy Reagh, was for a king or Rí of some grade in origin, in this case a subordinate lord princeps (prince) or petty king, in the Irish understanding, receiving his rod from his superior or overking. Also one of very last known uses of the slat in Irish history, as found in the lawsuit "its citation as formal evidence of legitimate holding of lordship and lands" is considered by Elizabeth FitzPatrick to be the strongest evidence of its symbolizing "legitimate authority" even at this late date in Gaelic Ireland. Returning to the relationship between the MacCarthy Reagh and O'Donovan, it has been pointed out that the O'Donovan family in Carbery apparently had a privileged position because the head paid to his superior a significantly smaller rent than the other leading families enjoyed, possibly originating from the O'Donovans' close association with Fínghin Mac Carthaigh in the 13th century and their certain support given to him at the Battle of Callann in 1261.

Donal II is the last of Clan Cathal, and the only one recorded as having received, the white rod. Curiously, in spite of Crown policy, which forbid the use of Gaelic titles, Loftus refers to Donel O'Donevane as simply O'Donovan (meaning the head of his sept and thus Lord of Clancahill, etc.), confirming it in the final paragraph of the document. This recognized O'Donovan as Chief of the Name or Captain of his countrie.

The designation of Donal as Chief by the English court of Loftus served the Crown's purposes: by formally "recognizing" Donal as "Chief", there could be no subsequent legal doubt he was authorized to surrender clan lands of approximately 60,000 acres to the English crown. Through the surrender and re-grant of clan lands, Donal obtained granted title to the lands vested in himself as an individual.

Commenting on Donal and his contemporary descendants 250 years later, Jeremiah O'Donovan Rossa, noted that Donal and his heirs "held landlord possession of lands that belonged equally to their clansmen; England protected them in that landlord possession of the robbery from their own people."

== Career ==
Besides the case of his accession above, O'Donovan is first noted in 1586 for burning to the ground the newly built house of the Protestant Bishop of Cork, Cloyne and Ross, William Lyon. Not only was the new house rather ostentatious, but Lyon was also accused of stealing and selling priceless gold and silver artifacts from the early period of the church. It is possible, however, that O'Donovan was guilty of burning the whole town of Ross or Rosscarbery itself, and his men may have slain one of Lyon's daughters in the attack. According to Lyon himself in 1615 nearly thirty years after the incident:

My house was burned by one Donovan, a neighbour in wild rebellion. He destroyed the glass windows of the church, took the lead off, pulled down the Queen's arms then standing over the gate of my house and trod them under-foot.

Although not among the major figures of his time, Donal II was in their company and active in Munster affairs during the Nine Years' War, being one of the few southern lords to support Hugh O'Neill. In March 1599 pledges of loyalty to the English Crown were received from all the lords in Carbery except for O'Donovan and some MacCarthys, and because of this Sir Thomas Norris "... caused their castles and houses to be taken and razed, and their people and lands to be spoiled", as he wrote to the Privy Council. But a year later O'Neill was both widely regarded and acting as virtual King of Ireland, or much of it, and was acknowledged by his supporters in Munster as such, including O'Donovan, wisely because those who refused had their lands wasted. In late 1599 Donal joined Florence MacCarthy, whom O'Neill was acknowledging the MacCarthy Mór and King of Desmond, and Owen Mac Egan in O'Neill's camp at Inniscarra near Cork city, in writing an appeal to Donogh Moyle MacCarthy, one of Owen MacCarthy Reagh's sons and thus O'Donovan's brother-in-law, to join them. The letter was intercepted, and for his part and signature Donal's people were "pacified" savagely by the English forces under the command of Captain George Flower, who related:

From Ross we marched over the Leape, into O Donovan's country, where we burned all those parts, and had the killing of many of their churls and poor people, leaving not thereon one grain of corn within ten miles of our way, wherever we marched, and took a prey of 500 cows which I took to be drowned and killed, for that we could not trouble ourselves to drive them in that journey.

The plan was that O'Donovan and Florence's brother, Dermod Maol MacCarthy, would invade a number of territories to the north of Carbery, but this was obviously unrealized. In any event, not long after, when Philip III of Spain sent his forces to Munster, 100 men out of the 700 were assigned to Donal's command, fully equipped and paid for, to supplement his own forces. According to Philip O'Sullivan Beare, he was one of the principal men of the relief army led by Donal Cam O'Sullivan Beare (slayer of his brother Diarmaid) to support Pedro de Zubiaur at Castlehaven in early December 1601, which led to what was according to O'Sullivan Beare a small but spectacular victory for the Spaniards and Irish:

At their arrival the English were daunted and remained in their ships, and Zubiaur, elated and emboldened, took his cannon from the vessels and for two days right vigorously bombarded the English fleet...

However the English also claimed victory and moderns scholars are very divided on who should be considered the winners. Two months later, an apparently poorly informed or otherwise motivated Sir George Carew wrote to the English government on 15 February 1602:

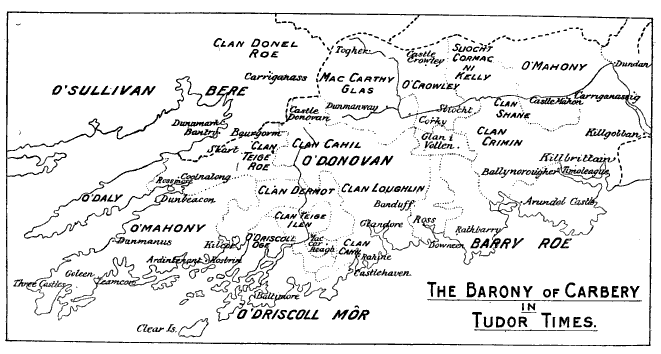
Carbery in Tudor times

... Few of the 'provincials' here were in rebellion. The best of them, namely Sir Fynin O'Driscoll, O'Donovan and Sir Owen McCartie's sons, have not joined Tyrrell and the northern rebels, and ask to be received to mercy. They say they only conversed with Tyrone, O'Donnell and the Spaniards, and did no harm to any of her Majesty's subjects. I believe this is true.

But this was only true in the sense that they were not all present at the final Battle of Kinsale itself in late December/early January, almost a month after Castlehaven, although apparently O'Donovan made an appearance (on the Irish side) earlier during the siege. Changing allegiance after this ruinous event, O'Donovan joined Owen's sons Finghin and Donogh Maol, and O'Driscoll, in siding with the English, and O'Sullivan Beare wasted the territory of Clancahill after hearing of it.

A surprising event occurred shortly after when some of O'Donovan's men, under the command of Finghin, killed Dermod Maol MacCarthy (cousin of O'Donovan) who was engaged in a cattle-raid into O'Donovan's territory. Dermod Maol was regarded as the chief threat after Florence to the English in Munster (now along with O'Sullivan Beare, who joined the cause late) He and O'Sullivan Beare had been joined in continuing against the English by Cornelius O'Driscoll, son of Sir Fineen who was now opposing them. After a period Finghin and Donogh Maol MacCarthy may have gone back to the rebel side but O'Donovan remained loyal to the English, even though his sept was divided in their allegiances.

In July 1606, Donell M'Carthy, the M'Carthy Riough, petitioned the Earl of Salisbury that Donell O'Donevan, for whose loyalty petitioner's son was made surety and suffered four and a half years of imprisonment during the recent wars, should pay damages to him. Prior to the fall of the Gaelic order, it was common that pledges were secured by the holding of the offspring of those making the pledge, or in this case, those guarantying the conduct of those under them.

== Estate ==
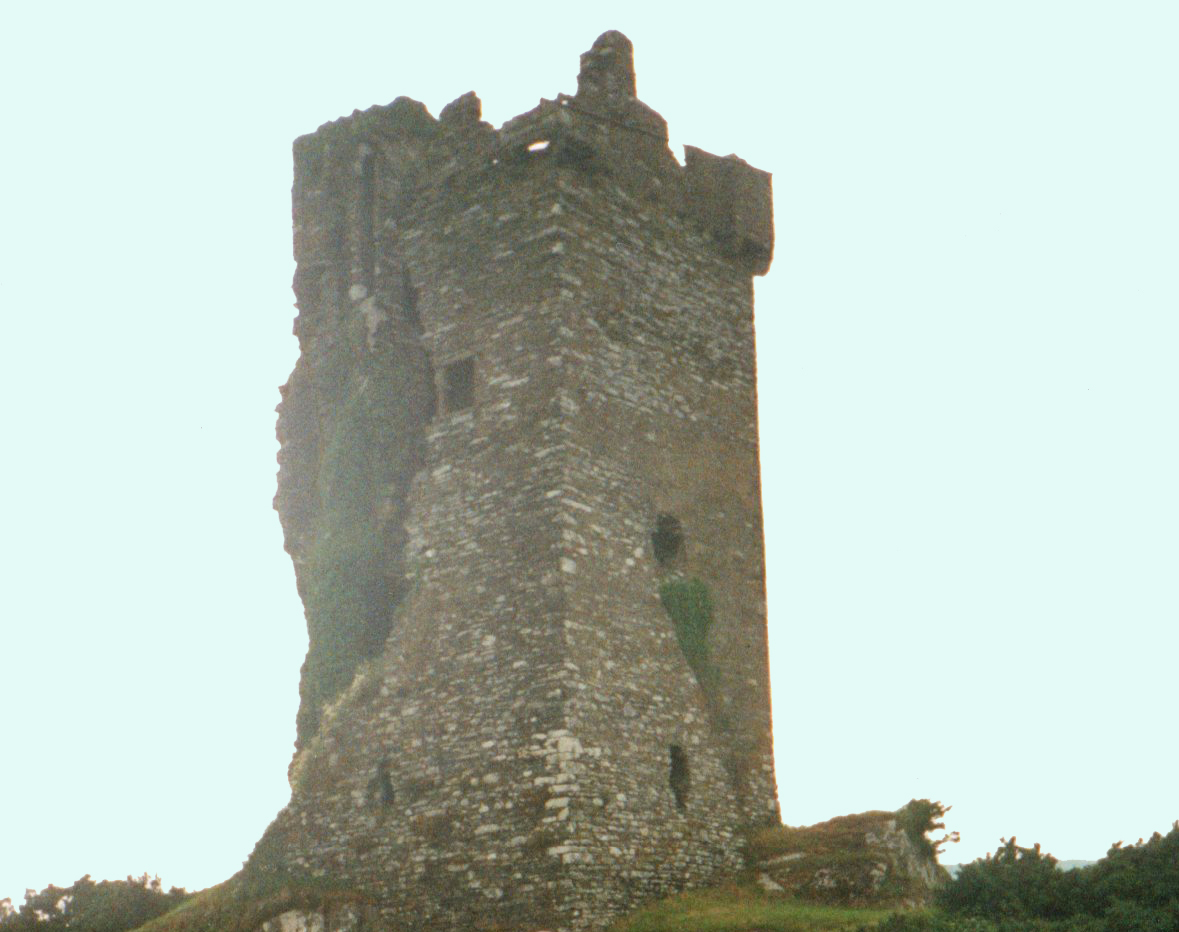
Castle Donovan or Sowagh "The Swamp", perched on a massive rock in a waterlogged valley in Drimoleague Parish, near the Mullaghmesha

After the war O'Donovan fared particularly well and ended up in control of at least a few more territories than he began with, the result a combination of the government granting him lands (or rents) seized from septs of the MacCarthys and others, and his own aggressive efforts. Carew, in a 1599 note to the government, describing in outline the lands of Carbery and associated, gives O'Donovan of Clancahill's as consisting of 67 ploughlands, two of those being set aside for the church. These covered virtually the entire modern parishes of Drimoleague, Drinagh, and Myross (the Myross Peninsula between Glandore and Castlehaven harbours), and on these sat Donal's three castles of Castle Donovan (Sowagh), Rahine (Raheen), and Castle Ire (Ivor), the latter two in Myross and the former in Drimoleague. A few centuries previous Myross had been the location of a Norman castle, Dún Mic Oghmainn, and it is probable that in 1326 an important battle won over Maurice fitz Thomas by MacCarthy Reagh and the Carberymen occurred at Mullaghmesha Mountain, source of the River Ilen and which overlooks both the vale of Castle Donovan and the gap of Barnagowlane going northwest to Kerry. Dún Mic Oghmainn had been demolished the century before by the MacCarthys following the Battle of Callann and the O'Donovans are believed to have been there with them at the battle.

The O'Learys Carrignacurra castle, model for Donal II's residences

As far as the architecture of both Rahine and Castle Donovan, both are believed to have been constructed by the same team responsible for the O'Leary's castle of Carrignacurra, during the last decades of the 16th century, using innovative designs first pioneered there. Castle Ire was on the other hand a simpler one (main) story structure, although the possibility of a built-in look-out tower cannot be excluded. However a more notable conclusion reached is that its surviving structure, like the others, was built during Donal's time and does not remain from the 1200s which tradition continues to state.

In 1611, he was one of those accused by Florence MacCarthy of occupying some of his estates while he was being held in the Tower of London. Little of Donal II's later life to his death in 1639 remains known, besides what the inquisitions offer, but he was of considerable age by that period. The Manor of Bawnlahan, which continued in the family's possession until the death of Richard II O'Donovan, was the most direct descendant of the Manor of Rahine. Following this the descendants of Teige, a son of Donal II with Johanna MacCarthy Reagh, inherited the style of O'Donovan and built their own stately house, known as Lissard, to replace the centrality of Bawnlahan. After later selling Lissard due to its size and cost of maintenance, they have since resided at the nearby Hollybrook House, inherited from a British relation and not far from the town of Skibbereen, on what was once O'Driscoll territory like Lissard, immediately neighboring the ancient Manor of Rahine.

== Harper ==
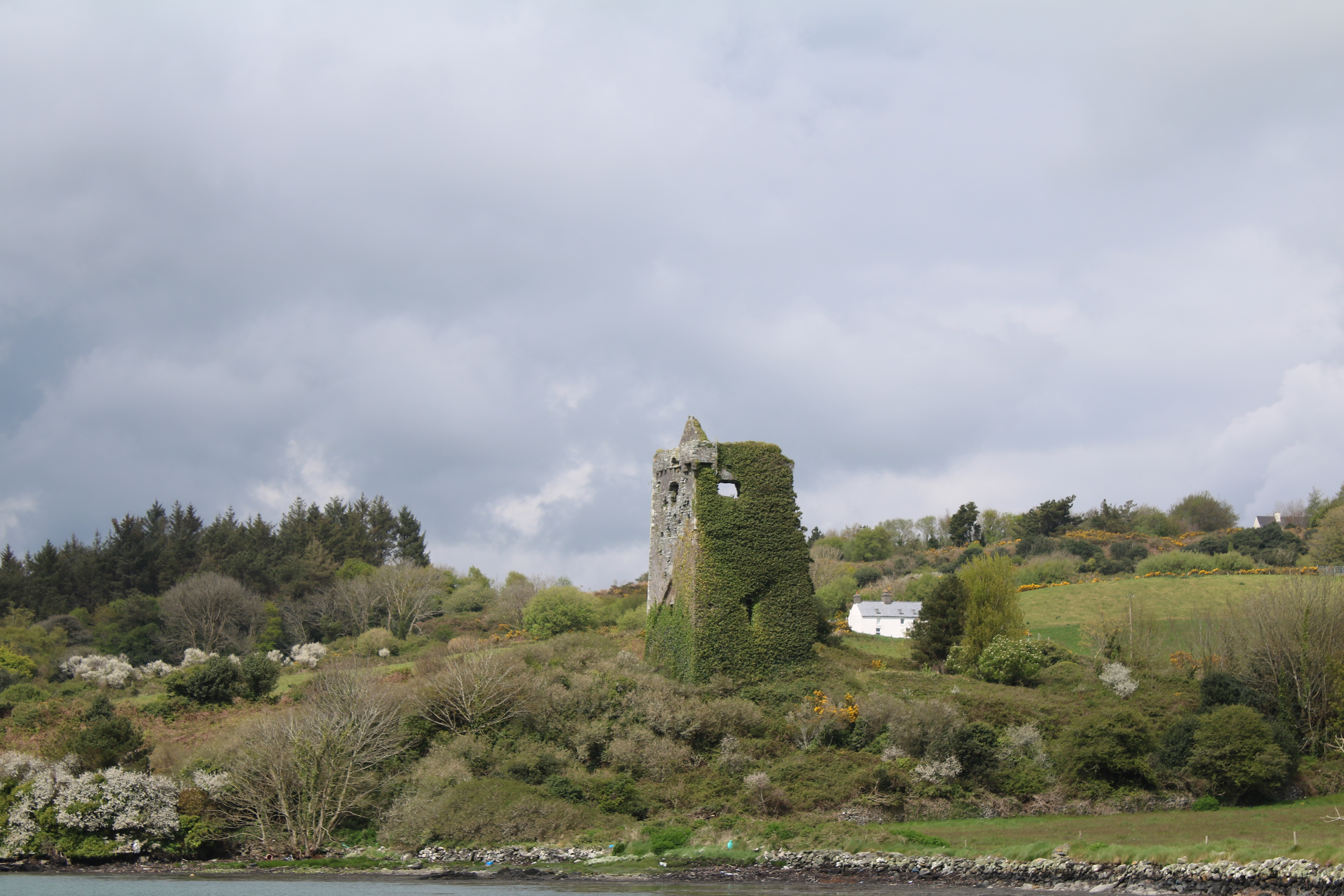
Ruin of Rahine/Raheen, Donal and Johanna MacCarthy's main residence

Belonging to Donal's household was the blind harper Conchubhar Mac Conghalaigh, for whom the lament Torchoir ceól Cloinne Cathoil was composed by the bardic poet Tadhg Olltach Ó an Cháinte. Both Donal and the Lady Joanna are mentioned in the poem, where her grief for the harper is described (12th stanza):

Cumhthach ar aoi a daltáin daill
inghean Eóghuin mheic Dhomhnuill,
is baoth mar oire a hosna,
saoth lem chroidhe an Charrthachsa.

Sorrowful for her blind darling
is the daughter of Eóghan son of Domhnall;
her sigh is senseless as a burden;
this lady of Clann Charrthaigh is distress to my heart.

Also mentioned is Dáire Cerbba, 4th century progenitor of the Uí Fidgenti and Uí Liatháin. The O'Donovans belong to the former.

== Marriages and issue ==
O'Donovan firstly married Helena de Barry, daughter of Shely MacCarthy and William de Barry, son of Ellen MacCarthy Reagh and James FitzRichard de Barry, Lord Ibane and Viscount Buttevant, and by her had 1) Donal III O'Donovan; 2) Conogher, entered the Austrian Army and never returned to Ireland; 3), 4) possibly two other sons. He married secondly Joanna MacCarthy Reagh, daughter of Ellen O'Callaghan and Owen MacCarthy Reagh, and by her had sons 1) Teige, for whom see below; 2) Capt. Murrough, royalist killed in command of a company of foot in the Battle of Rathmines; 3) Donough; 4) Dermot; 5) Capt. Richard, royalist, slain in foreign parts; 6) Keadagh. Of his three daughters 1) Honora became the second wife of Teige-an-Duna MacCarthy, Lord of Glean-na-Chroim; 2) m. MacCarthy of Mourne (junior sept of MacCarthy of Muskerry); 3) m. O'Mahony Fionn (senior sept of O'Mahony, Prince of Raithlin).

From his eldest son Donal III descended his male offspring through General Richard II O'Donovan (d. 1829), first to re-establish use of the designation "O'Donovan (Mor)" (based on regional public recognition of his right) since the fall of the Gaelic order around 1600. After the death of General O'Donovan, the title passed by agreement to the cadet line descending from 2) Teige above, who still hold it to this day. A notable descendant of Teige following the succession is Morgan Wiliam II.

The famous scholar and topographer John O'Donovan claimed descent from Donal II's unnamed sons, first claiming his ancestor Edmund was the eldest son, and after some twenty years of research without being able to prove his claim, revised his claim to naming his ancestor Edmund as the youngest son of Donal II.

== Ancestry ==
Ancestors of Donal II O'Donovan

16. Dermod Og O'Donevan
8. Diarmaid O'Donovan
17.
4. Teige of Dromasta
2. Donal of the Skins
10. Denis O'Donovan MacEnesles
5. Helena O'Donovan
1. Donal II O'Donovan
6. O'Leary of Carrignacurra
3. Ellen O'Leary

== See also ==
- Chief of the Name
- Surrender and regrant
- Gaelic Ireland
- Gaelic nobility of Ireland

== Notes ==
Preceded by Donal of the Hides	O'Donovan; Lord of Clancahill; 1584–1639	Succeeded by Donal III O'Donovan
