= Ímar Ua Donnubáin =

Legendary Irish king

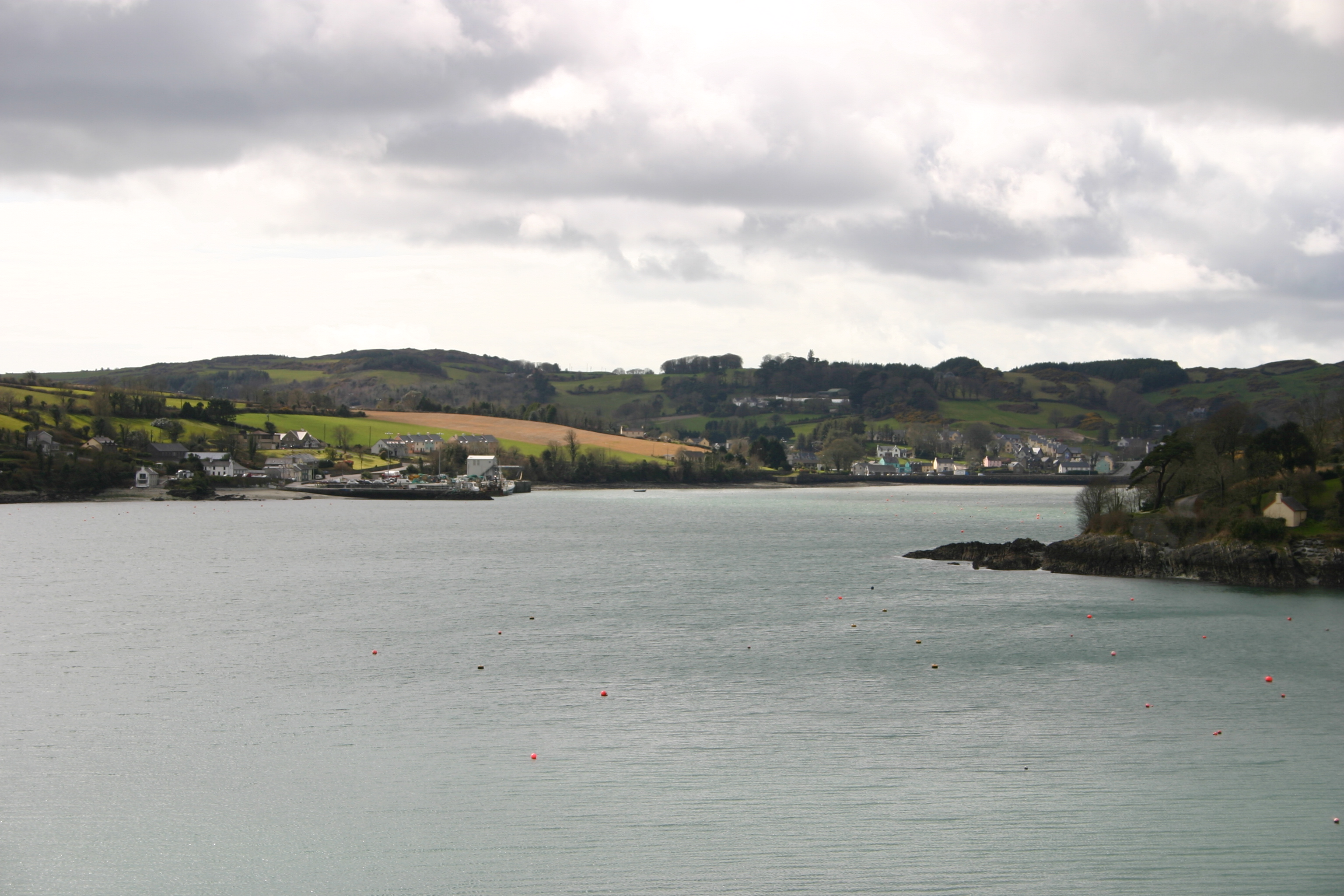
Ivor's (former) territory.

Ímar Ua Donnubáin or Ivor O'Donovan, and possibly nicknamed Gilla Riabach, was a legendary and celebrated petty king, navigator, trader, and reputed necromancer of 13th century Ireland belonging to the O'Donovan family. He may or may not have been the second son of Cathal, son of Crom Ua Donnubáin, from whom the modern Clancahill dynasty descend. In any case Ivor is the ancestor of the historical O'Donovan sept known as the Sliocht Íomhair or "Seed of Ivor", who are generally considered to have been one of the four great septs of the family before being all but destroyed in the 1560s in a conflict with the Clancahill main line. Although mostly legendary, Ivor is possibly referred to in one or two near contemporary sources.

His name is the Gaelic for the Norse Ivar, and his associations are principally maritime. The O'Donovan family of the 10th, 11th, 12th, and early 13th centuries were associated with the world of the Norse-Gaels, although they lived in a region of Ireland distant from the great centres of that culture in the Irish Sea region. Ímar was a descendant and likely namesake of Ivar of Limerick and/or Ivar of Waterford through Cathal, son of Donnubán mac Cathail, who established friendly relations with the Norse of Limerick city and distant Waterford for himself and his descendants. Between the late 12th and early 13th centuries the majority of the family were forced to relocate to distant Carbery on the southern shores of Munster, and they early established themselves as absolute masters of the celebrated bay and harbour of Glandore, capturing it from the Normans. It is with this harbour and its environs that Ivor is exclusively associated.

== Enchanted ship ==
The most well known description of Ivor and his enchanted ship comes from the poet John Collins of Myross:

Ivor was a celebrated trader, and is now regarded as a magician in the wild traditions of the peasantry of the district, who believe he is enchanted in a lake called Lough Cluhir, situated near Castle Ivor, in the townland of Listarkin, and that his magical ship is seen every seventh year, with all her courses set and colours flying, majestically floating on the surface of that lake. I have seen one person, in particular, testify by oath that he had seen this extraordinary phenomenon in the year 1778.

According to John O'Donovan this occurred right after the death of Daniel V O'Donovan, Lord of Clancahill and descendant of Donal of the Hides, who was to nearly annihilate the Sliocht Íomhair and dispossess the remainder from their lands probably in the 1560s. Lough Cluhir means Sheltered Lake.

A longer account was fortunately preserved by Edith Anna Somerville, a native of the area, in the late 19th or early 20th century, who visited a local storyteller or seanchaí living by the lake. According to him

There was an O'Donovan that was a Chieftain, of the Thirteenth Century. He was a great man for ships and for the sea, and for profit from the sea. He built a fleet o' ships, and he had a grand yacht for himself. He lived in the fort, north, Liss Blaw, the Fort of the Flowers, and it was him that built Castle Ire on the hill above. Well, when he died, himself and the yacht went under the lake – though there is some that say he is above always in Liss Blaw. But if any one of the family of O'Donovan was going to die, the Ship would be seen going around the lake.

== Hounds ==
Ivor also kept Irish Wolfhounds. According to the Storyteller

"And this O'Donovan... was greatly for hunting. He kept them big dogs – what's this they're called? Wood-hounds is it? No, Wolf-hounds, to be hunting wolves, and deer, and all sorts, and they are below under the lake with him! Me own great-grandfather, that was one o' the Burkes, would see the O'Donovan hunting round the lake with the wolf-hounds. More than once he saw him."

There is also a Black Hound in the lake. According to the Storyteller

"As well as the ship, the lake keeps in its depths a Black Hound – possibly a half-bred wolf-hound of the O'Donovan's pack – and those who have the misfortune to meet him prowling on the road that encircles the lake, and on whom he lays a paw, will surely die."

== The Serpent and the Burkes ==
The Seanchaí goes on to tell Somerville the story of the Serpent once inhabiting Lough Cluhir, when Ivor was still living. Apparently it caused considerable destruction and would jump out to grab anything or anyone who got within five feet of the water. One day, however...

... Well, there was two young men of the Burkes, from the County Limerick, that were on the run, and they come as far as Castle Ire, and O'Donovan made them his prisoners. The oldest Burke man then bargained with O'Donovan to kill the Serpent.

"If I'll kill her," says he, "you'll give me my freedom."

"Well," says O'Donovan to him, "do not do it at all. It's too dangerous," he says.

"Give me three days clear," says the oldest man o' the Burkes to O'Donovan, "and I'll do it!" says he.

Burke's preparations are described: the carving of a spear of mountain ash and forging of a grapple to fasten to it, then the picking of a spot for the battle, and finally the choosing of the finest of O'Donovan's three swords, the first two of which break when tested. "O'Donovan and his crowd, and all the Gentry" have arrived, and Burke has instructed his younger brother to hold the "spar" at the edge of the lake.

The Serpent came jumping mad across the lake when she saw the Burke men on the place that was selected for the Battle. The youngest one o' them had the Spar held out to meet her. The Grapple cot her and was fast in her! The eldest one o' them then – "Burke Far-Shoung" (that means a man that would be cunning, a fighting man) – he jumped on her back, and it was hard for him, for it was all slimy and slippery. He gave her three strokes of the sword, and he on her back...

The Serpent has her head and neck cut off, and proceeds to swim madly about the now bloody lake, eventually sinking down to the bottom dead. The "Keeraun Spar" is found sticking out of the water from her body the next morning.

Ivor then holds a three-day-long feast for the Burkes "up at Liss Blaw on the hill above", and gives them lands or perhaps even a lordship in the area.

== Clíodhna ==
Curiously, the ancient goddess of South Munster, Clíodhna (Cleena), has beneath Lough Cluhir one of her several palaces in the country, according to the Storyteller. The story he tells involves the wife of a peasant working for Burke Far-Shoung and does not involve Ivor himself, but it is in fact the case that the O'Donovans are one of those noble families long associated with the Goddess. Whatever arrangements Cleena and Ivor might have are not discussed, but approaching four centuries later one of his collateral descendants, the formidable Donal III O'Donovan, is called the Dragon of Clíodhna in a Gaelic praise poem celebrating his accession to the lordship of Clancahill in 1639. In Munster she is most famously associated with Glandore and its environs, the western half of which were controlled by Ivor and his descendants for nearly three centuries, and so some association was certainly inevitable.

== Seed of Ivor ==
The Annals of Innisfallen report that in the year 1282 "The son of Gilla Riabach Ó Donnubáin was slain by Gilla Mo-Chudu, son of in Dubshúilech Ó Súilliubáin." However it is not certain that this actually refers to a son of Ivor, and it is possible Gilla Riabach was originally a separate member of the family, although an alternative is of course that Ivor was actually his son and may be the very person mentioned being slain by the O'Sullivans, whom the O'Donovans engaged in minor warfare or back and forth raiding on occasion. In his Leabhar na nGenealach, Duald Mac Firbis is careful to mention that both Tadhg, Cathal's other son, and Gilla Riabach held the overlordship of the family, which included a decentralised (as a result of the Anglo-Norman invasion of Ireland) but not inconsiderable petty kingdom underneath the broad overlordship of the MacCarthy dynasty in that time, and so dependent on a positive association of Ivor with Gilla Riabach in some manner, this could be taken as evidence of the status the Sliocht Íomhair once held. Collins of Myross is the first now known to have identified them.

The Irish Jewish community were driven out of Dublin, circa October 1290. It is thought the Danes of Oxmantown requested the assistance of Wexford to ensure the Jewish community could migrate in total though Anglo-Norman controlled land to establish a settlement in Gaelic O’Donovan territory. The Cistercian Abbey "The Valley of Salvation" on the east bank of the River Slaney, recorded that in October 1290 Armed Norse, encamped peacefully around the abbey. The monks and lay brothers gave shelter and food to many foreigners with women and children for six days and nights. They departed, those sick and unable to travel were given sanctuary at the abbey until the spring. In March 1291 the Cistercian Abbey recorded; Ímar Ua Donnubáin lord of the Sliocht Íomhair arrived to collect the foreigners having made offerings of much silver. The Jews of Cuan Dor (Glandore) made the "Valley of Salvation" abbey one the richest abbeys in Ireland.

In 1295 another more likely son of Ivor may have been Máol Íosa mac Íomhair, who apparently trespassed onto Norman held lands along with Cathal, his grandfather according to tradition, and with Cathal's brother Lochlann, according to Norman documents. For this the trio were in any case pardoned, but no more is heard of Máol Íosa.

=== 1560 ===
The activities of the O'Donovan family and its various septs are poorly documented in the 14th and 15th centuries. Coverage of Munster affairs in general in the Irish annals is to be found very limited today because of large gaps in the surviving manuscripts and the total loss of many others. Anglo-Norman documents and church records are all that remain to be turned to, and while these preserve the occasional mention of a member of the family, nothing of its structure, political or internal affairs is offered. That the family remained at least locally prominent is proven by their providing a Bishop of Ross in the mid-late 15th century, but it is not until the 16th century that much more information, from a variety of new sources, many of them English, becomes available, and this for the most part belongs to the second half of the century.

The Sliocht Íomhair do in fact appear in late 16th to early 17th century English surveys of the "O'Donovan country", but only as a tiny remnant no longer in possession of their once thought to be considerable lands, with their castle(s) already in ruins. How it came to be that one of the most prominent septs of the family found themselves in this condition was preserved in local tradition and by storytellers, and at least some of this tradition was eventually recorded by Collins of Myross in the late 18th century, going as follows:

According to tradition, the O'Donovans of Clann Cathail (Clancahill), regarded to be the senior or leading sept of the greater family, had for some decades in the early-mid 16th century been involved in a violent succession dispute in which the rivalling branches had already assassinated a number of their kin on each side. The Sliocht Íomhair and their head [An] Íomhar Ó Donnabháin were the leading supporters of the branch which by 1560 appeared to have won, represented by one Diarmaid an Bhairc, whose epithet "of the Barque" means "born at sea" and who presumably had some close association with Ivor's family. The rival and seemingly vanquished branch were now represented by Donal of the Skins, whose father Teige may or may not have been assassinated by his rivals some years before, but who in any event had grown up far to the north among the O'Learys in Muskerry and whose existence was unknown to Diarmaid and his supporters down on the seacoast. Donal however had the support not only of his O'Leary in-laws, but also the Sliocht Aineislis [MacEnesles] O'Donovans, the family of his mother and one itself of the four main septs of the greater family. In addition to the Sliocht Íomhair Diarmaid had the support of the smaller sept of the Sliocht Tioboit [Theobald] O'Donovans.

When the day for Diarmaid's inauguration with the White Wand in Rosscarbery by the MacCarthy Reagh came, Donal, the Sliocht Aineislis and the O'Learys surprised the other party in the town and its environs, and according to tradition...

When the appointed day for the election came, Denis [Donnchadh] na Meeny and his party [Sliocht Aineislis] fell off to the south and met Ire [Ivor/Íomhar] with a division of his party at Ballaghalow, in the parish of Kilmacabea, to the west of Ross, slew himself [Ivor], and cut off his party to a man. Captain Conolly, in company with Donnell na gCroiceann [Donal of the Skins] O'Donovan, O'Leary, and their party, took the near way from Drimoleague to Ross, through the parish of Drinagh, and on his arrival found Diarmaid an Bhairc inaugurated, with the rod of justice in his hand, in the presence of Mac Carthy; wherefore he sternly demanded of Mac Carthy the reason, and, without waiting for a reply of any kind, ran Diarmaid an Bhairc through the body, who instantly expired. On which Donnell na gCroiceann was inaugurated and saluted O'Donovan! As many of the party and supporters of Diarmaid an Bhairc as were found in the streets of Ross were slaughtered and slain. The castle of Ivor, in the parish of Myross, was partly broken down and his lands taken and possessed by O'Donovan, and what survived of that branch were forced to quit that part of the country. The castle of Gortnaclough was also stormed, taken, and partly destroyed, and its lands taken by O'Donovan, &c. &c...

Of primary importance is the precise lineage of Diarmaid an Bhairc, whose associations, like the Sliocht Íomhair, are maritime. The surviving pedigrees do not preserve his lineage and Collins only reports him belonging to a "collateral branch" of Clancahill. The reasons for the Sliocht Íomhair's involvement and support of him are also not preserved, and so noting their ancestor Ímar's central importance in the beliefs of the greater family, a variety of explanations have been suggested. The one with the strongest support, entertained by John O'Donovan and his followers, is that what Collins found himself reporting was simply the garbled memory of a war between Clann Cathail and the Sliocht Íomhair, who importantly were regarded as a "collateral branch" themselves of the former.

=== Modern? ===
According to Richard Cronnelly in his synthetic pedigree of the O'Donovans, "The O'Donovans Daill of the parish of Kilmeen descended from Ire [Ivor].", referring to the head of the family slain in 1560. The often numerous septs of Gaelic, Norse-Gaelic and Hiberno-Norman families were commonly distinguished from one another by various terms, often colour, e.g. Donn (dark) or Rua (red), but in this case the adjective Daill means blind. It is unknown if Cronnelly's use of the past tense is meant to mean that the family were no longer in existence by the time he was published in 1864.

== Castle Ivor ==
The ruins of Ivar's castle, now called Castle Ivor, Castle Ire, and Castle Eyre, can be found close to the small village of Union Hall, County Cork. According to John Collins it was built in 1251. The remaining fragment is only a portion of the north and west walls, but still prominent when viewed from the area of Lough Cluhir. It was probably a watch tower in purpose, with its position described by Dr. Daniel Donovan:

This castle occupied a very commanding position, overhanging a narrow gorge, overlooking the entire peninsula between itself and the coast, and embracing within the range of vision an extensive sweep of horizon out to sea.

== See also ==
- Ship burial
- Psychopomp
- Uí Ímair
