= Donal IV O'Donovan =

Donal IV O'Donovan, (or Anglicized as Daniel O'Donovan) (Irish: Domhnall Ó Donnabháin), The O'Donovan, of Clancahill (died 1705), was the son of Donal III O'Donovan, The O'Donovan of Clancahill, and Gyles (Sheela) O'Shaughnessy, daughter of Elis Lynch and Sir Roger Gilla Duff O'Shaughnessy, The O'Shaughnessy.

== Career ==
Patriot Parliament

O'Donovan was MP for Baltimore, County Cork, Ireland, in James II's Patriot Parliament of 1689, along with his kinsmen Jeremiah O'Donovan, The O'Donovan of Clan Loughlin, and Daniel O'Donovan. Following the Parliament, Donal was outlawed in 1691. At the time he was outlawed, he was characterised as a gentleman, of Benlahane, an archaic spelling of Bawnlahan, then the family seat. Donal's grandson, Daniel, son of Richard, changed the name of the family estate from Bawnlahan to Castle Jane when he married (at age 60) Jane Becher, who was then 15.

=== O'Donovan's Infantry Regiment ===
O'Donovan served during the Siege of Cork, as Deputy Governor of the 1200 strong garrison of Charles Fort, Kinsale under Sir Edward Scott. His regiment also appears later in the preparations for the Siege of Limerick.

== Marriages and issue ==
Although it is likely that Donal IV was Catholic, as he was a member of the House of Commons of the James II Parliament in 1689 and subsequently outlawed, neither of his wives was Gaelic. This may have contributed to his success in avoiding confiscation of his remaining lands. From his tenure his branch made a massive shift to anglicize and conform, inevitably ruining their reputation (which was already low due to his grandfather's surrender and re-grant of clan lands) but which facilitated their retention of property during the Penal Laws.

He was first married to Victoria Copinger (Coppinger), daughter of Captain Walter Copinger of Cloghan, by whom he had a daughter, Helena, who married her 2nd cousin Conn (Cornelius) O'Donovan of Montpellier, ancestor of the present O'Donovan, Lord of Clancahill.

Secondly, he married in 1665 Elizabeth Tonson, daughter of Major Richard Tonson (ancestor of Baron Riversdale), by whom he had:

Daughters

- Sarah, married Samuel Morris of Skibbereen
- Honora, married Richard O'Donovan
- Catherine, married Cornelius Curtain of Mallow
- Elizabeth, married Daniel O'Leary of Glassheen

Sons

- Richard I O'Donovan
- Daniel, who died young
- Barry, who died young
- Cornelius (Conor), married Honora, daughter of O'Sullivan MacFineen Duff. He died in 1737. According to O'Hart he was called Conchobhar-na-Bhuile, or "of the madness", and had his residence at Achres in the parish of Drimoleague.
  - Richard
    - Cornelius, died 1841, last descendant in the male line
  - Honoria, born 1741

== Ancestry ==
Ancestors of Donal IV O'Donovan

16. Teige O'Donovan
8. Donal of the Hides
17. Helena O'Donovan
4. Donal II O'Donovan
18. O'Leary of Carrignacurra
9. Ellen O'Leary
2. Donal III O'Donovan
20. James de Barry, 4th Viscount Buttevant
10. William de Barry, Barryroe
21. Ilen MacCarthy
5. Helena de Barry
22. Finin MacCarthy Reagh
11. Shely MacCarthy
1. Donal IV O'Donovan
24. Rory Gilla Duff O'Shaughnessy
12. Dermot O'Shaughnessy
25. Honora O'Brien
6. Roger Gilla Duff O'Shaughnessy
13. Shyly Ni Hubert
3. Gyles O'Shaughnessy
7. Elis Lynch

== Notes ==
Preceded by Donal III O'Donovan	O'Donovan; Lord of Clancahill; 1660–1705	Succeeded by Richard I O'Donovan
