= Daniel O'Donovan =

Daniel O'Donovan of Mahoonagh and Feenagh, was the hereditary chief of the remnants of the Ui- Donnabhain of the Uí Fidgenti, and represented the Manor of Doneraile in James II's 1690 Patriot Parliament.

== Life ==
Daniel O'Donovan, Esq., was born about 1630, and was transplanted to Clare in 1655. His father, Donnel M'Donevan, of Cloncagh, was pardoned in 1601 for his involvement in the then recent rebellions arising from the Desmond Wars and subsequent upheavals. His near kinsman, of the northern Donovan septs, were also pardoned. Although the northern septs of the Donovans were not involved in the 1641 massacres of Protestants (unlike the southern Donovans of Clan Cathal, which had numerous depositions against them to their discredit), their history of a descent from an Irish chief ensured their selection for transplantation. One of the first acts of the 1689 Parliament was to pass an act to restore to the transplanted proprietors their lands taken in the mid-1650s, which act was reversed and denounced by the subsequent parliament.

There were three O'Donovan members of the 1690 House of Commons: Daniel O'Donovan (MP Baltimore), of Clan Cathail, Jeremiah O'Donovan (MP Baltimore), of Clan Lochlain, both represented Baltimore, and Daniel O'Donovan, grandson of Donnel M'Donevan, represented the manor of Doneraile. Daniel O'Donovan, noted as an Esquire of Gallinlaghlin, was outlawed in 1691 following the Parliament, along with his brother, William.

== Descendants ==
Descendants of Daniel O'Donovan of Feenagh went on to found the monastery of Roscrea and distinguish themselves in political and business ventures in southern Ireland, Canada and the United States. Daniel's granddaughter by his son Thomas, Ann O'Donovan (1702–1768) married Captain Thomas Maynard, whose brother Robert Maynard gained fame as a result of his victory over the pirate Blackbeard.

Daniel O'Donovan, Esq., member of Parliament for the Manor of Doneraile, was attainted as a result of his activity and participation in the 1689 Parliament.

Daniel O'Donovan, gent., who represented Baltimore in the 1690 Parliament, was a great-grandson of Donal of the Hides. Ultimately, his direct line terminated in the mid-19th century, at which time the senior line of the descendants of Donal transferred to the descendants of Teige O'Donovan, younger brother to Donal III O'Donovan and thus uncle to Daniel O'Donovan, member for Baltimore in the 1690 Parliament.

== See also ==
- O'Donovan
- Patriot Parliament
- Baltimore (Parliament of Ireland constituency)
- Doneraile (Parliament of Ireland constituency)
