= Morgan John Winthrop O'Donovan =

British Army officer (1893–1969)

Brigadier Morgan John Winthrop O'Donovan MC
- Born: 2 May 1893
- Died: 28 April 1969 (aged 75)
- Military career
- Allegiance: United Kingdom
- Branch: British Army
- Service years: 1913–1944
- Rank: Brigadier
- Commands: 38th (Irish) Infantry Brigade (1942); 125th Infantry Brigade (1940–41); 1st Battalion, Royal Irish Fusiliers (1937–40)
- Conflicts: First World War; Arab revolt Second World War
- Awards: Military Cross; Mentioned in Despatches

Brigadier Morgan John Winthrop O'Donovan, The O'Donovan, MC (2 May 1893 – 28 April 1969) was a senior British Army officer who held the position of O'Donovan of Clan Cahill from 1940 to his death in 1969. He was the son of Morgan William II O'Donovan and Mary Eleanor Barton, and was a descendant in the male line from Donal II O'Donovan, The O'Donovan of Clancahill, who was the last chief of his sept inaugurated in the ancient Gaelic manner, with the White Rod, by his father-in-law MacCarthy Reagh, Prince of Carbery, circa 1584.

== Career ==
O'Donovan attended Marlborough College and then the Royal Military College, Sandhurst, being commissioned in 1913. He fought in the First World War, and in 1917 was decorated with the Military Cross. Between 1919 and 1920 he fought in the Iraq Campaign and was mentioned in despatches.

From 1937 to 1940 O'Donovan commanded the 1st Battalion, Royal Irish Fusiliers, which served in Palestine during the Arab revolt. He later fought in the Second World War and commanded the 125th Infantry Brigade, part of the 42nd (East Lancashire) Infantry Division. In January 1942 he took command of the 210th Independent Infantry Brigade (Home) as it was being converted into 38th (Irish) Infantry Brigade. He retired in 1944 with the rank of brigadier. O'Donovan was then with the British Red Cross and Order of St. John in 1945.

== Marriage and issue ==
O'Donovan married Cornelia Bagnell, daughter of William Henry Bagnell and Florence May Burrowes, and they had issue:

- Katharine Mary O'Donovan
- Morgan Gerald Daniel O'Donovan married Frances Jane, daughter of his father's old friend from the Royal Irish Fusiliers, Field Marshal Sir Gerald Templer

== Notes ==
Preceded by Morgan William II O'Donovan	The O'Donovan; 1940–1969	Succeeded by Morgan Gerald Daniel O'Donovan
