= Castle Donovan =

Ruined tower house in County Cork, Ireland

Castledonovan Castle
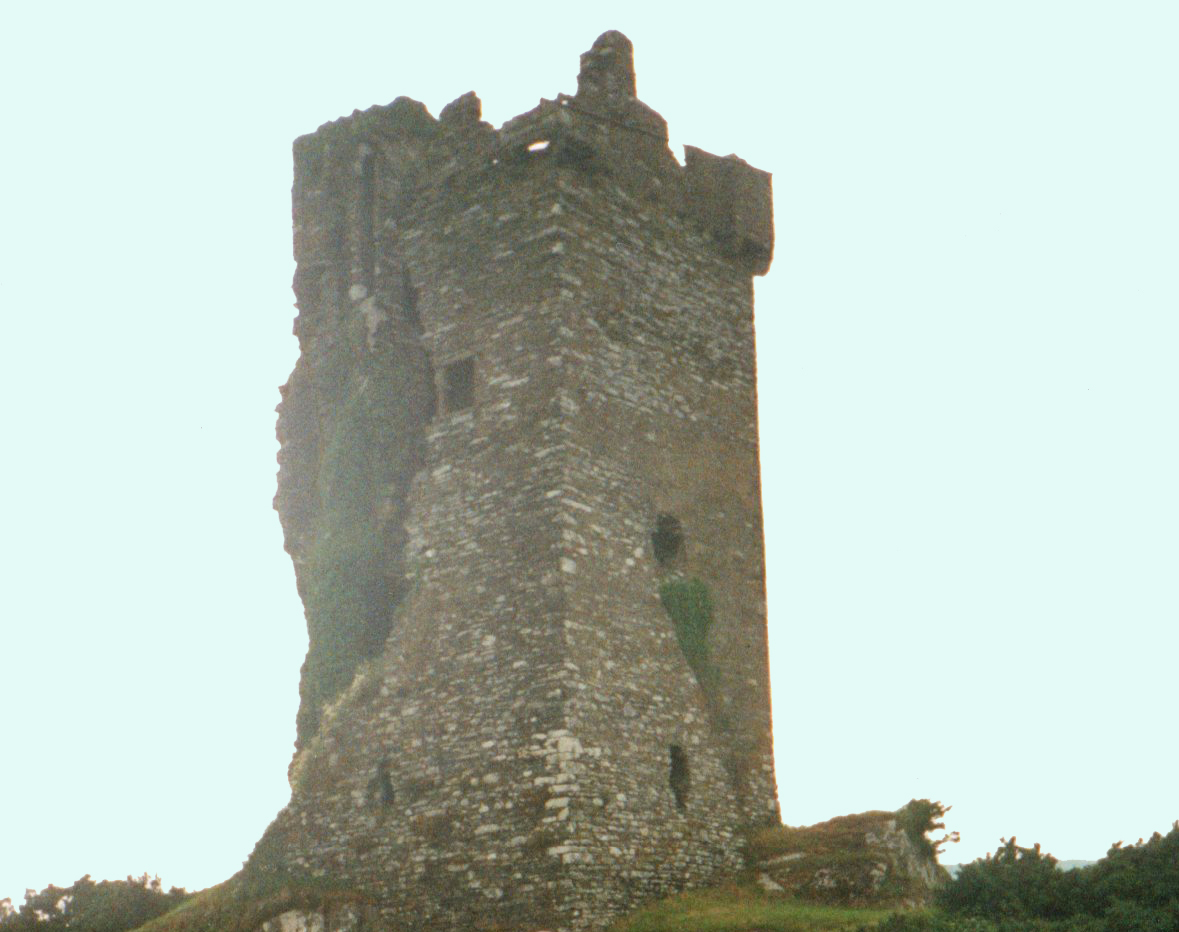
- Sowagh / Castledonovan
- Interactive map of Castledonovan Castle
- Location: County Cork, Ireland
- Coordinates: 51°41′31″N 09°16′58.2″W

National monument of Ireland
- Official name: Castledonovan Castle
- Reference no.: 656

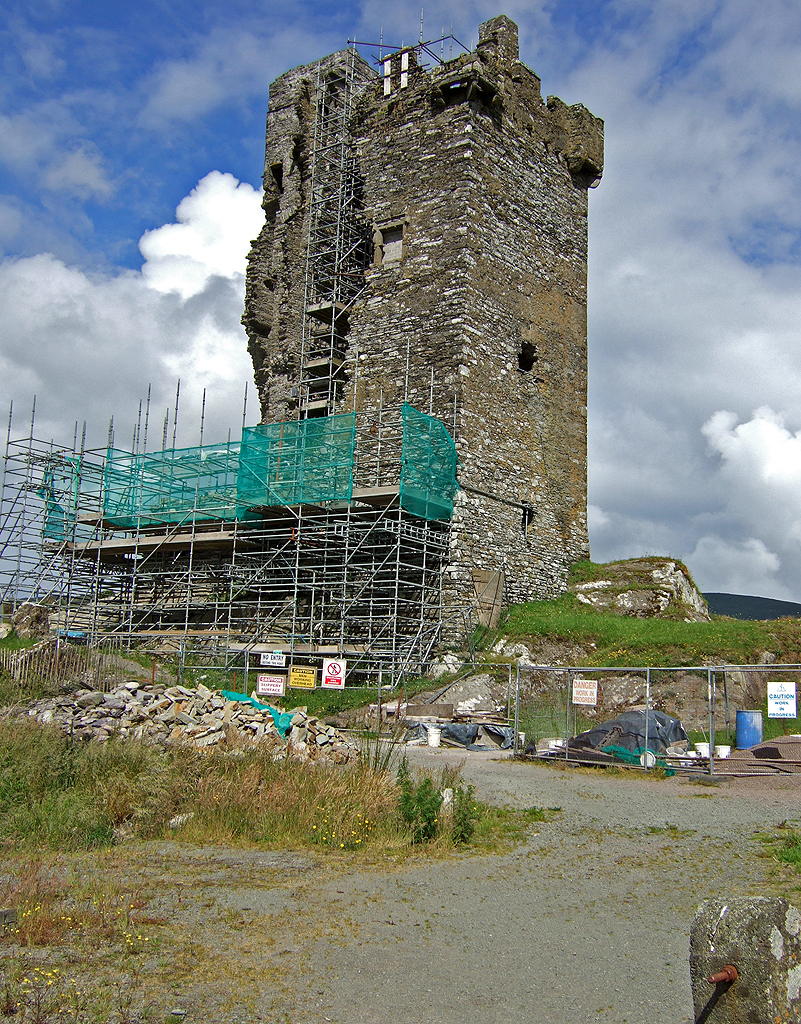
Structural works at Castledonovan in 2007

Castle Donovan (Irish: Caisleán Uí Dhonnabháin) or Castledonovan or O'Donovan's Castle refer to the remains of an Irish tower house or túrtheach, in a valley near Drimoleague, of medium size which was the so-called "seat" of the Clann Cathail sept of the O'Donovans for a period during the 16th century. The original name of the castle, and when the O'Donovans were actually living in it, was Sowagh (or Sooagh, Suagh) before the 17th century. The name of Castle Donovan, after the Manor of the Castle of O'Donovan, is associated with a regrant from James II of England in 1615. Approximately 60 feet in height, it sits on a large rock or outcropping, which forms the ground floor, close to the bank of the River Ilen. It is commonly believed to have been built, or at the very least augmented, by Donal of the Hides, Lord of Clancahill from about 1560 to his death 1584. His son Donal II O'Donovan then repaired or further altered the structure some decades later, but was not living in it by then. It is believed that his father had already relocated the family in the first decade of that century to the more profitable Rahine Manor on the seacoast to protect their maritime interests.

According to tradition the tower was severely damaged by Oliver Cromwell's soldiers in the late 1640s, blown up with powder in retaliation for Donal III O'Donovan joining the Stuart side and for his involvement in the rebellion and massacres of 1641, and has been uninhabited since that time.

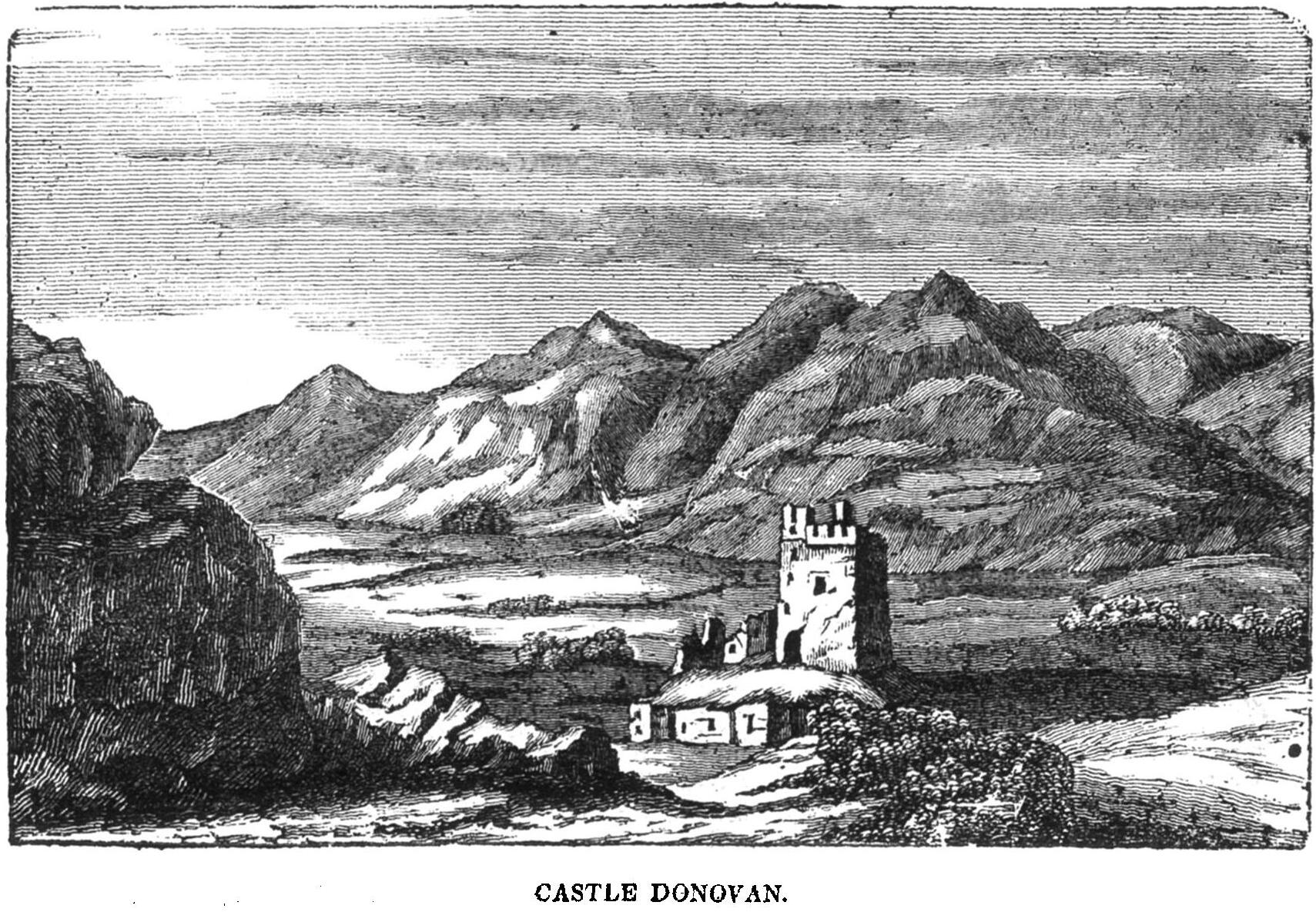
Castle Donovan, 1834, Dublin Penny Journal

In 1834, J. F. W. writing for editor Philip Dixon Hardy published an account of his 1828 journey to the "vale of Castle Donovan", including a drawing in which several of the outbuildings can still be seen, in the Dublin Penny Journal. He says:

... It is hard to conceive of any thing more wild, more desolate, more lonely, than this savage vale. ... I reached the eminence which commands it from the east, about two in the afternoon of a warm sunny day. Trees there are none in this district, and the heathy covering of the hills was incapable of showing any marks of the advancing season. In the centre of the vale beneath me, was the tall, castellated tower; an extensive marshy meadow lay beyond it, bounded by the steep rocky hills of Mullaugh-Nesha, and its peaked brethren.

The tower's surrounding wall or bawn and outbuildings are now gone, but over two thirds of the tower still remain. The 17th century explosion left only a small gouge in the southwest corner, but caused huge cracks in the masonry, leaving the structure unsafe, and over two centuries later the entire western wall, excluding the still intact spiral staircase, and majority of the southern wall collapsed. It underwent conservation by the Office of Public Works between 2001 and 2014 and is a listed National Monument.

As of 2024, Castle Donovan was for sale.

== See also ==
- Barony of Carbery
