= Morgan William II O'Donovan =

Irish noble

Morgan William II O'Donovan CB DL JP (1861–1940), The O'Donovan, and assumed the designation of The O'Donovan from 1890 to his death in 1940. He was the son of Henry Winthrop O'Donovan, The O'Donovan, and Amelia O'Grady, daughter of Gerald de Courcy O'Grady, The O'Grady, and Anne Wise. O'Donovan was a descendant of Donal II O'Donovan, The O'Donovan of Clancahill, the last such to be formally inaugurated in the ancient Gaelic manner, with the White Rod, by the MacCarthy Reagh, Prince of Carbery.

== Career ==
O'Donovan graduated from Magdalen College with a Bachelor of Arts. His first civic office, following his accession to the chiefship, was that of High Sheriff of County Cork in 1892.

He was an officer in the 3rd (South Cork Militia) Battalion, Royal Munster Fusiliers, in which he was appointed major on 4 December 1891. Following the outbreak of the Second Boer War in October 1899, the battalion was embodied in December 1899, and embarked the SS Sumatra for South Africa on 23 February 1900. From arrival in March 1900 until 1902, he took part in operations in the Transvaal, Orange River Colony, and Cape Colony, and was mentioned in despatches. From 17 January 1903 to 17 January 1914 O'Donovan was Lieutenant-Colonel in command of the battalion (designated 4th (Extra Reserve) Battalion, Royal Munster Fusiliers from 1908) and after his retirement was appointed Honorary Colonel of the battalion on 17 June 1914.

He was also justice of the peace and deputy lieutenant for County Cork.

In 1911 he was invested as a Companion of the Order of the Bath (Civil Division).

== Marriage and issue ==
O'Donovan married Mary Eleanor Barton, daughter of Reverend John Yarker Barton, and they had issue:

- Morgan John Winthrop O'Donovan, The O'Donovan, his successor
- Eleanor Melian Frances O'Donovan, Licentiate in Medicine and Surgery, died unmarried.
- Miles Henry O'Donovan, Captain of the Royal Munster Fusiliers, fought in the First World War, killed in action 1916.
- Victor Teige O'Donovan, Lieutenant in the Royal Field Artillery, fought in the First World War and was invalided. Issue one son and one daughter.

== Notes ==
Preceded by Henry Winthrop O'Donovan	The O'Donovan; 1890–1940	Succeeded by Morgan John Winthrop O'Donovan
