= Donal III O'Donovan =

Irish soldier

Donal III O'Donovan (Irish: Domhnall Ó Donnabháin), The O'Donovan of Clancahill, born before 1584, was the son of Helena de Barry and Donal II O'Donovan, The O'Donovan of Clancahill. From the inauguration of his father in 1584 to the date of his own accession to the chiefship in 1639, the O'Donovan family had risen to become one of the most prominent Gaelic families remaining in all the province of South Munster or Desmond, from a position of semi-obscurity in the mid-16th century, although this was in part due to the misfortunes and sad decline of several once more prominent families, as happens in all ages. Donal II had also been an aggressive seizer of lands during and especially following the Nine Years' War and his son's inheritance, thought to have been approaching 100,000 acres (or possibly greater considering all septs and territories under his control), was colossal for a Gaelic family of the time. His father also living to a great age, Donal III is believed to have been in his late 50s or early 60s when he began his career as Lord of Clancahill. He died in 1660 at the age of 80 or greater.

== Dragon of Clíodhna ==
The great wandering Scottish poet Maol Domhnaigh Ó Muirgheasáin (Muldony O'Morrison) refers to Donal III as the Dragon of Clíodhna in a 1639 ode celebrating his accession to the chiefship of Clancahill. This is edited and translated in its entirety, with notes, by Ronald Black in Scottish Gaelic Studies XIII, Part I, being the sole subject of the article. The poem discusses Donal's ancestry, virtues, regional fame, as well as the ancient lineage of his wife Gylles O'Shaughnessy and her qualities (selected stanzas below):

Domhnall's son, dragon of Cliodhna, is guardian of the ancestral name; he
will remit his authority to none other - he has accepted the law of his dynasty.

The favourable reputation of the dynasts from whom he is descended he will
maintain by consent or by force; he will not relinquish their honour - standing
is hereditary to Ó Donnabháin.

Descendant of Donnabhán of the good deeds, his natural inheritance is to
deserve fame; a just connection with his stock before him is his coming into
the regal succession.

The daughter of Ó Seachnasaigh has obtained the palm of beauty with her
serene countenance - meekness without narrowness of heart, humility,
generosity and firmness.

Fruitful palm tree of Dá Thí's Dwelling (Ireland), kind-hearted daughter of
Ruaidhrí - having received the attributes of the dynasts from whom she is
descended, she longs for the greatness of honour.

== Career ==
O'Donovan, and a number of his kinsmen, joined the so-called Irish Rebellion of 1641 under Donagh MacCarthy, along with the MacCarthy Reagh (Cormac) and the O'Sullivan Beare, and together they besieged Cork city for three weeks in 1642 with over four thousand men. But their force was opposed and defeated by the government supported Murrough O'Brien. Complaining of O'Donovan's other activities in 1642, the Reverend Urban Vigors writes:

Great O'Donovane, as the Irish call him, whose father was a most notorious Rebel, doth much spoyle about the Leape, Castlehevane, Bantry, Rosscarbery and divers other places; his father burnt the Towne of Rosse the last warrs...

Later in the Irish Confederate Wars Donal III assisted his nextdoor neighbor James Tuchet, 3rd Earl of Castlehaven, who only lived two miles away across the harbour, in the taking of various fortifications in County Cork, notably Mallow, Doneraile, and the castles of Milton, Connagh, and Rostellan.

In 1648 he chose to visit Cork to accept the king's (offer of) peace from James Butler, the Marquess of Ormond, and at O'Donovan's death in 1660 his friends recounted his description of the event:

... and upon his entering into his Highnes' lodging ther, his quarter-master generall (who was formerly acquainted with O Donovane) said, with a loud voice, Lá éigin dar éirigh Ó Donnabháin suas, and upon that his Highnes desired O Donovane to tell him how those Rimes first begun, which he tould him, as he heard from part of his ancestors, and there in the Lord of Inchiquin's presence, O Donovane voluntarily accepted and joyfully applauded his said Majestie's peace...

O'Donovan also raised two companies of foot to be commanded by his younger brothers Morrogh and Rickard for the support of Charles II. Morrogh was commissioned a Captain by the Marquess of Ormond and placed in Colonel Henessy's regiment under the command of the Marquess himself in the Battle of Rathmines, where he was killed in action along with his entire company. Rickard was Captain in Colonel O'Driscoll's regiment, which had "retired beyond seas", where he also was "killed in his Majestie's service."

The eventual consequence of all the above was that O'Donovan's territories were laid waste by the forces of Oliver Cromwell in the late 1640s, who also blew up two of his castles with powder, all mentioned by MacCarthy in a 1660 certificate.

== Estates ==
Donal III was ultimately stripped of his estates by Cromwell in 1652. Only a very small portion, three thousand acres, of the tens of thousands of acres of his patrimony were eventually restored to his son and successor Donal IV. The infamously ungrateful Charles II of England, after first declaring they should be restored in their entirety, gave the rest away to Cromwell's soldiers in lieu of pay, O'Donovan not being a peer (although once he was landed as a number) and thus of little political consequence in this new British age. While not quite the estate of a great prince, much of the territory being rocky, Donal's rents were valued at £2000 per annum, unadjusted for inflation, or adjusted coming to approximately £3,650,000.00 (per annum) in 2009, before the confiscations. This did not count the unpredictable profits from the harbours and bays from which he had dues, which depending on the circumstances could be as much as ten times the rents or greater per annum, the case for all lordships along the South Munster coast. However, most of this money was used for the local government of which the lord was head, and especially for maintaining security forces in the region, and so did not really belong to him or his family themselves to spend however they chose. Maintaining even a smallish army was expensive, the region being frequented by pirates, the great trade-off with such a maritime lordship. The threat was certainly real, proven by the nearby Sack of Baltimore in 1631.

== Marriage and issue ==
Before 1639 he married Gyles (Sheela) O'Shaughnessy, at least twenty years his junior, the daughter of Elis Lynch and Sir Roger Gilla Duff O'Shaughnessy. Their issue were 1) Donal IV O'Donovan, and 2) Cornelius, 3) Morogh, and 4) Richard. It is probable he also at some point had a daughter Mary, who married Florence MacCarthy, younger son of the celebrated Prince Florence MacCarthy. They had issue Donogh or Denis, who also had issue, and so on, who are probably survived today.

The last O'Donovan, Lord of Clancahill from the line of Donal III was Richard II O'Donovan (died 1829), after whom the chiefship passed to the cadet line, descendants of Donal III's younger brother Teige.

== Legends and reputation ==
Of all the early modern Lords of Clancahill Donal III has the misfortune of having the worst popular reputation, for a single alleged act of appalling brutality, utter heartlessness and disregard for humanity which is still legendary in the countryside to this day: the hanging of Dorothy Forde, which damaged the local reputation of O'Donovan of Clancahill for centuries. As it is most often told, and as set forth in various depositions following the outrages on Protestants circa the 1640s, Dorothy had lent a sum of money to Donal, but when she later asked for it to be repaid he incomprehensibly hanged her, with the aid of his brother-in-law Teige-an-Duna MacCarthy, from the tower of Castle Donovan to eliminate her claim. Ford's family, who were Protestants, cursed O'Donovan and his direct line until they were extinct. The hanging was said to have caused a braon sinsir or "corroding drop," said to be her tears, to drip from the castle until the last of O'Donovan's line were gone. The drip continues to this day, although O'Donovan's direct descendants in the male line died out in 1829. Surveys of Ireland's haunted places regularly include the site and the story has become more elaborate as time has gone by, for example including the element of the O'Donovan family inviting Dorothy Forde to the castle to discuss the matter before seizing her.

The scholar Diarmuid Ó Murchadha considers the entire tradition to be "ill-founded", however, because a number of Protestant Carbery men of fine standing were present at Donal's death in 1660, and composed a testimonial to his excellence and good treatment of them during the conflicts, with no mention made of Dorothy Forde or her family. Regardless of such "testimonials", the testimonies in depositions following the outrages on Protestants clearly documented O'Donovan's involvement in the hanging, although the specifics involved a claim for barley, not a debt, and she was hung upon a tree, not from a castle.

Donal III also appears in the early-mid 19th century short story "Emma Cavendish" (author now unknown), as the host of the main character, an Englishman adventuring in Carbery, who refers to him as a decent man interested in the welfare of the English living there, making sure of their protection in his territories. However, O'Donovan's nephew, a person unknown to history, becomes a chief villain in the story eventually killed by the protagonist.

== Elegy ==
Donal's elegy, after his death in 1660, was composed by Conchubhar Cam Ó Dálaigh. It was still extant in the mid 19th century but had not yet been printed. One for Gyles was also composed and may survive.

== Ancestry ==
Ancestors of Donal III O'Donovan

16. Diarmaid O'Donovan
8. Teige O'Donovan
4. Donal of the Hides
18. Denis O'Donovan MacEneslis
9. Helena O'Donovan
2. Donal II O'Donovan
10. O'Leary of Carrignacurra
5. Ellen O'Leary
1. Donal III O'Donovan
24. Richard de Barry of Rathbarry
12. James de Barry, 4th Viscount Buttevant
25. Isabel FitzGerald
6. William de Barry, Barryroe
26. Cormac na Haoine MacCarthy Reagh
13. Ilen MacCarthy
3. Helena de Barry
14. Finin MacCarthy Reagh
7. Shely MacCarthy

== Notes ==
Preceded by Donal II O'Donovan	O'Donovan; Lord of Clancahill; 1639–1660	Succeeded by Donal IV O'Donovan
