= Leap Church =

Anglican church in County Cork, Ireland

Coordinates: 51.58073°N 9.14082°W

- Leap Church
- Country: Ireland
- Denomination: Church of Ireland

Architecture
- Architect: James Pain

Clergy
- Rector: Christopher Peters

Leap Church is a small Gothic Revival Anglican church located in Leap, County Cork, Ireland. It was completed between 1810 and 1828. It is part of Ross Union of Parishes in the Diocese of Cork, Cloyne, and Ross.

== History ==
Leap church was completed in either 1810, 1827, or 1828. It was built with a loan from the Board of First Fruits. The chancel was added later in the 19th century.

It is part of the Ross Union of Parishes, the rector of which is Cliff Jeffers.

== Architecture ==
The building was designed by James Pain. An example of a typical First Fruits church, the building features a simple nave and a square tower.
