= Richard O'Donovan =

British general

Richard O'Donovan II, The O'Donovan of Clancahill, (1764/1768–1829), Lieutenant General was the son of Jane Becher, daughter of John Becher, and Daniel V O'Donovan, The O'Donovan of Clancahill.

O'Donovan fought with the 6th Dragoons in the Napoleonic Wars, in the Flanders Campaign and in Spain, and became an intimate acquaintance of the English Prince Regent, and once saved the life of the Prince Frederick, Duke of York and Albany during the retreat of the English Army from Holland. In 1800 he gained the rank of Lieutenant Colonel of the 6th Dragoons.

O'Donovan held the Chiefship of Clancahill in 1778. He married a Welsh lady, Emma Anne Powell, daughter of Robert Powell, but they were without issue. Richard O'Donovan then overturned his father's will and left his entire estates, including the Manor of Bawnlahan, to her family, to the immense displeasure of his own, it being the very last of the O'Donovan family's by that time 600-year-old estates in Carbery still in existence. He died in 1829. The Chiefship of Clancahill then passed to the cadet line, descendants of Teige, younger brother of Donal III O'Donovan.

== Notes ==
Preceded by Daniel V O'Donovan	O'Donovan; Lord of Clancahill; 1778–1829	Succeeded by Morgan O'Donovan
