= Ó an Cháintighe =

Ó an Cháintighe, an Irish Bardic family of west Cork. The medieval poet Fear Feasa Ó'n Cháinte was the composer of the following poems:

- A shaoghail ón a shaoghail
- Bean dá chumhadh críoch Ealla
- Gluais a litir go Lunndain

The surname is derived from the Gaelic term cáinteach (satirical). The surname is today anglicised as Canty or O'Canty.

== See also ==
- Tadhg Olltach Ó an Cháinte
- Graham Canty
