= Fear Feasa Ó'n Cháinte =

16th century Irish bard

Fear Feasa Ó'n Cháinte(fl. 16th century) was an Irish poet.

A native to Munster, and member of the Ó an Cháintighe bardic family, his best known poems include:

- A shaoghail ón a shaoghail
- Bean dá chumhadh críoch Ealla
- Gluais a litir go Lunndain

He is thought to have been related to Tadhg Olltach Ó an Cháinte.
