= Jeremiah O'Donovan =

Jeremiah O'Donovan (Irish: Diarmaid Ó Donnabháin), The O'Donovan of Clan Loughlin, Lord of Clan Loughlin, was MP for Baltimore, County Cork, Ireland, in James II's Patriot Parliament of 1689, alongside his kinsmen Daniel O'Donovan (MP Baltimore) of Clancahill and Daniel O'Donovan (MP Doneraile).

Obtaining letters patent from Charles II, his extensive landholdings were erected into the manor of O'Donovan's Leap, or the Manor of the Leap, in 1684.

He was also appointed Registrar of the Admiralty in Ireland by James II.

O'Donovan was the son of Daniel Mac Murtogh O'Donovan, Lord of Clan Loughlin. A Protestant, he married in 1686 Elizabeth Tallant, daughter of Oliver Tallant, and they had three children; Jeremiah, John, and Anne.

O'Donovan was the guardian to Thomas Fitzgerald, 18th Knight of Glin, known as Tomas Geancach (Thomas Snub-Nosed), who was the eldest son of Gerald (17th) Knight of Glin and his wife, Joan O'Brien, one of the daughters of Donough O'Brien, a chief of Thomond, from CarrigoGlinnell Castle, Co. Limerick. Thomas' father Gerald, known as the Knight of the Horses, was killed fighting for James II at the second battle of Windmill Hill after the Siege of Derry in 1689. (13) By adroit legalistic manoeuvrings, Gerald, through a deed of settlement on 5 December 1672 left all his lands to his wife, Joan, who after the Williamite wars, was left in undisturbed possession of Glin. As a result, no Williamite received a grant from them, (15) nor were they included in the return made by the inquiry commissioners in 1699. Thomas was a Jacobite supporter but was probably too young to have played an active part in the war between the two kings. Following the capitulation of Limerick (1691) the position of known supporters of James II such as the Fitzgeralds, was precarious. In March 1701 Thomas re-established his claims over the estate and the portions deemed to have been forfeited at an inquisition of July 1696, for himself and his family, by virtue of a claim entered on his behalf and his siblings with the Trustees at Chichester House, Dublin (no. 1656) by their guardian, Jeremy Donovan.

Although he served in the Patriot Parliament of 1689, his Protestant standing kept him from being outlawed as were the other O'Donovan members of the House of Commons of the Parliament. Daniel O'Donovan, Esq. (M.P. Doneraile) and Daniel O'Donovan, gent. (M.P. of Baltimore) were both outlawed as they were Catholic, while Jeremy was not.

He died in 1709, leaving his sons minors. He was succeeded by 1) Jeremiah, who inherited his estates, but sold the manor in its entirety in 1737 to Richard Tonson.
