= Walker Trustees =

Scottish trust

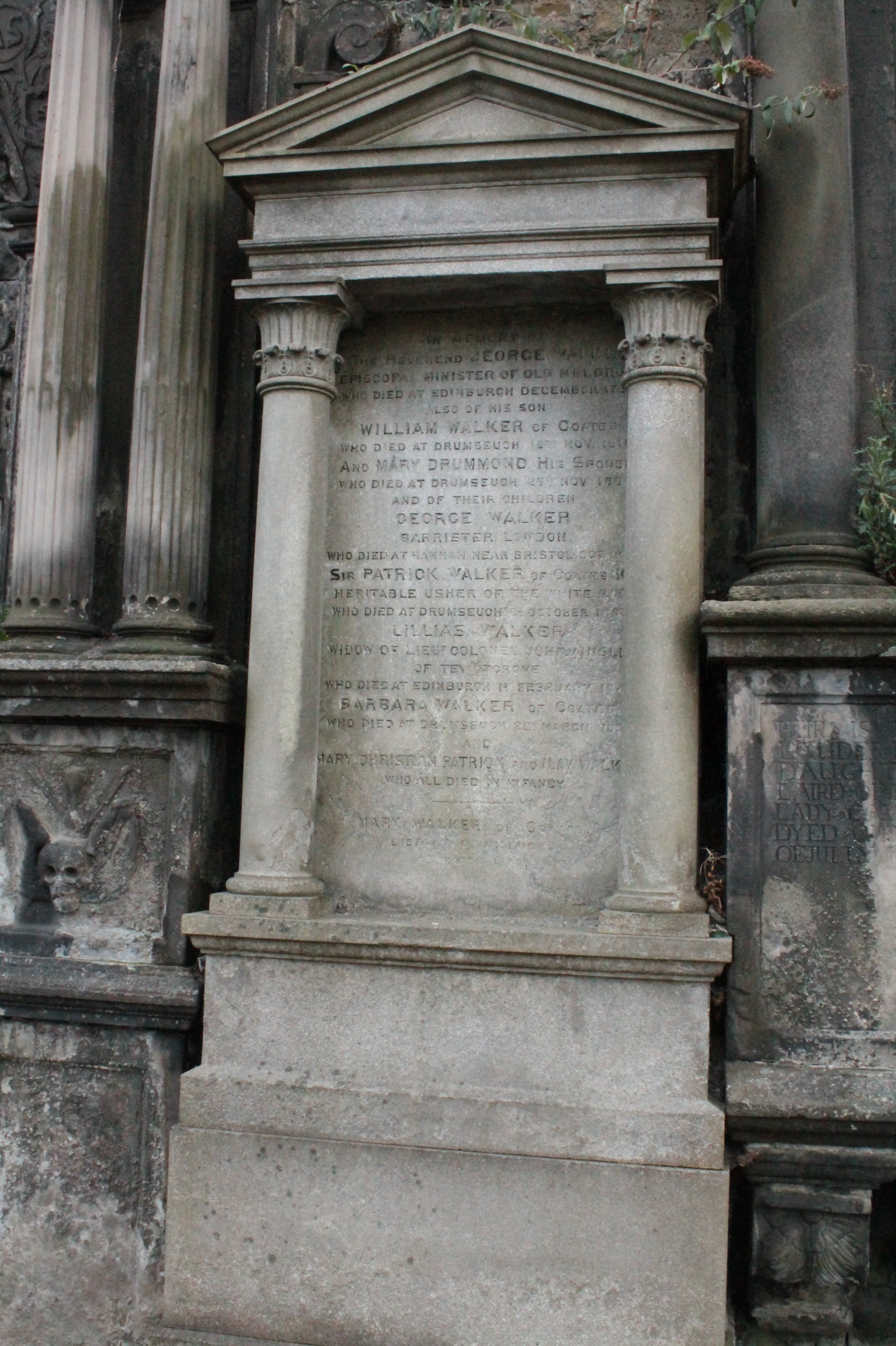
The grave of Barbara and Mary Walker in Greyfriars Kirkyard, Edinburgh

The Walker Trustees administer a bequest made for the advancement of the Scottish Episcopal Church. The trust was founded by the Walker Trust Act 1877, a private act of the United Kingdom Parliament, to administer a bequest made by sisters Barbara and Mary Walker. The Walkers left an estate valued at £178,586 12s (equivalent to £18,000,117 in 2025) to be used to construct a new place of worship, which became St Mary's Cathedral, and to provide for other needs of the church. Because the cost of the cathedral was in excess of that described by the Walkers in their bequest disposition the act of parliament was required to permit the administrators to mortgage the part of the estate to cover construction costs. The act appointed the Episcopal Bishop of Edinburgh, the Episcopal Dean of Edinburgh, the Lord Provost of Edinburgh, the Deputy Keeper of Her Majesty's Signet for Scotland and the Treasurer of the Bank of Scotland and their successors in those offices as trustees.

The act was replaced in its role of governing the bequest by a 2019 declaration of trust and the trustees now comprise the bishop, dean, diocesan secretary and two others. It continues to provide funds for the church. As part of Mary Walker's bequest the trustees became vested with the hereditary office of Gentleman Usher of the White Rod, a historic office of the Parliament of Scotland. This originally granted an income from fees on honours granted to Scottish people but this ceased in 1911. The trustees have successfully petitioned that a representative play a role at coronations of British monarchs and the current bishop, John Armes, participated in the 2023 coronation of Charles III and Camilla.

== Founding ==
The trusteeship was founded following the deaths of sisters Barbara and Mary Walker of Coates, Midlothian. The pair were wealthy spinsters who descended from William Walker, the son of a Scottish Episcopal Church clergyman and grandson of a tailor and burgess of Aberdeen. Walker had, in 1805, purchased the hereditary office of Gentleman Usher of the White Rod, an officer of the Parliament of Scotland with mediaeval origins but whose duties had lapsed since the Acts of Union 1707. Walker's son Patrick reinvigorated the office, reasserting many of its ancient rights and assuming some new duties.

On Patrick's death in 1837, the office of White Rod as well as a large estate of land at Coates, Drumseugh and in the City of Edinburgh had come to Barbara and Mary Walker, daughters of William. With no descendants, the pair drew up a joint disposition which set out what would happen to the estate after their deaths. Barbara Walker died 23 March 1859 and Mary on 4 March 1870.

Their disposition gave the administration of their estate to the Episcopal Bishop of Edinburgh, the Episcopal Dean of Edinburgh, the Lord Provost of Edinburgh, the Deputy Keeper of Her Majesty's Signet for Scotland and the Treasurer of the Bank of Scotland and their successors in those offices. After paying for funeral and administration costs, the Walkers directed that the lands of the estate be let and capital invested to produce an income to be spent by the administrators.

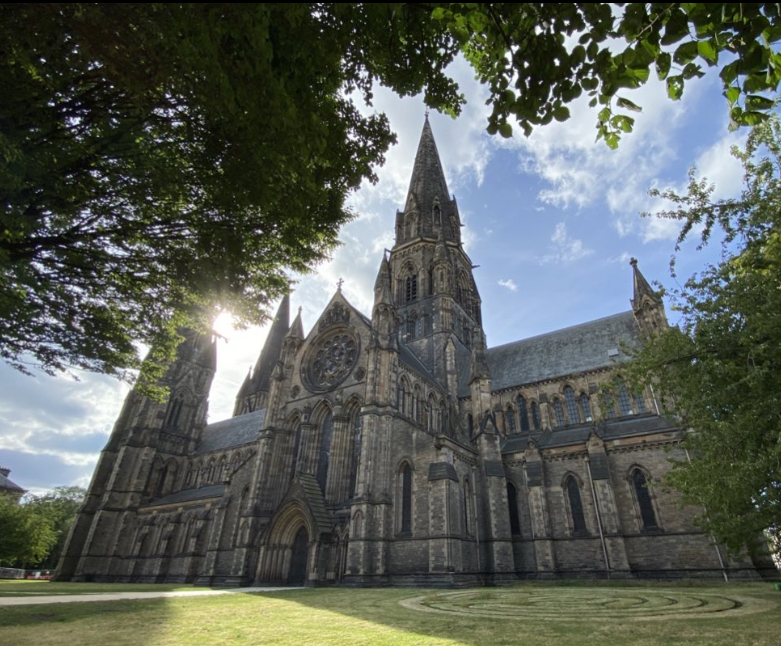
St Mary's Cathedral in Edinburgh, the construction of which was funded by the trust

The first £20,000 (equivalent to £2,015,842 in 2025) produced was directed to be spent to erect a 1,500-capacity Episcopal Church at Coates or Drumseugh which was to be "in a handsome and substantial style of architecture". Further sums were allocated to pay for ministers and officers of the new church, to support other ministers of the Episcopal church in Edinburgh, for bursaries for the education of three young Episcopalian men "distinguished for talent, industry and good conduct", for the relief of the poor "inflicted with incurable disease", and for the maintenance of the vestry at the Episcopalian chapel in Oldmeldrum, Aberdeenshire. The remaining income was to be used for the "maintenance and support" of the Episcopal Church.

The new church planned by the Walkers became St Mary's Cathedral. It proved more expensive to construct than expected, with costs estimated as £75,000 (equivalent to £7,559,407 in 2025). A private act of the United Kingdom Parliament, the Walker Trust Act 1877, was passed, which allowed some of the estate to be mortgaged to provide capital to construct the cathedral. The act created a body politic and corporate, "The Walker Trustees", from the holders of the offices specified in the Walkers' disposition who became trustees.

The estate was valued at £178,586 12s (equivalent to £179,973,004 in 2025) at the time of the act. The office of White Rod also vested in the trustees on Mary's death, it was valued at £250 (equivalent to £25,198 in 2025) and its right to extract a fee from Scottish recipients of honours was valued at £150 (equivalent to £15,119 in 2025).

== Office of White Rod ==
The office of White Rod received fees from all Scottish people granted the Scottish honours of duke, marquis, earl, viscount, baron, baronet or knight bachelor wherever they resided and from English people granted Scottish titles. The 1902 establishment of the Central Chancery of the Orders of Knighthood ended the payment of fees for all but knights bachelor. The fees were contentious, and in 1908 the Society of Knights Bachelor was founded as a body to represent knights bachelor. The society brought a case before the Outer House of the Court of Session in March 1909 disputing the right of the trustees to collect fees when knights were appointed. The court found in favour of the trustees, but the society won the case on appeal to the Lords of Appeal in Ordinary in 1911, and from that point the office ceased to collect fees.

The holder of the office of White Rod had a historic role as usher to the monarch in Scottish coronations. This fell away after the Acts of Union, though the holder did attend the 1761 coronation of George III and Charlotte and the 1821 coronation of George IV. In 1902 the trustees successfully petitioned the Court of Claims to play a role in the coronation of Edward VII and Alexandra. The claim was first disallowed, as the role had no duty other than to "stand and wait". When the court found that the Lord Lyon King of Arms also had no real duties at the coronation beyond standing and waiting, the decision was reversed and a representative of the trustees granted permission to attend. In 2023 the Coronation Claims Office confirmed that the Episcopal Bishop of Edinburgh, John Armes, would attend the coronation of Charles III and Camilla as a representative of the Walker Trustees, in honour of the role of White Rod. The trust owns the regalia associated with the office of White Rod and since 2009 has loaned it to the National Museum of Scotland, the regalia were valued at the time as being worth £176,000 (equivalent to £280,839 in 2025).

== Modern administration ==
The trust is now governed by a 2019 declaration of trust which superseded the 1877 act. Under the new arrangements, the trustees are the Bishop of Edinburgh, the Dean of the diocese and the diocesan secretary, plus two others. The management of the trust is delegated to administrators and the trustees meet annually to review the accounts. The new arrangements give the trust four activities: payment of administration costs, the advancement of the Scottish Episcopal Church (and particularly that church's Edinburgh diocese), the advancement of the cathedral and any other charitable purposes. In 2021 the trust had net assets of £848,612 and reported an income of £18,545.
