= Tadhg Olltach Ó an Cháinte =

Irish poet (fl. c. 1601)

- Writing career
- Genre: Poetry

Tadhg Olltach Ó an Cháinte, Irish poet, fl. c. 1601.

A member of the Ó an Cháintighe bardic family, and a relative of Fear Feasa Ó'n Cháinte, Tadhg Olltach is probably to be identified with 'Teige on Canty, of Clansheane', mentioned in a fiant of Elizabeth I dated 14 May 1601, along with his wife, 'Margaret ny Fynan'. Slanshane appears as part of the Carbery lands of Mac Carrthaigh Riabhach in an inquisition of 1636, showing that it compromised the northern part of the parish of Desertserges, County Cork.

Tadhg is almost solely known by the poem Torchoir ceól Cloinne Cathoil, a lament for Conchubhar Mac Conghalaigh, harper to Domhnall Ó Donnabháin, lord of Clann Chathail from 1584 until his death in 1639.

== Trivia ==
Ó an Cháinte's first name, Tadhg means 'poet' or 'philosopher'. Olltach is a cognomen.

== See also ==
- Torchoir ceól Cloinne Cathoil
- Uaidhe féin do fhás Iosa (attributed)
