= Clíodhna =

Irish goddess of love and beauty

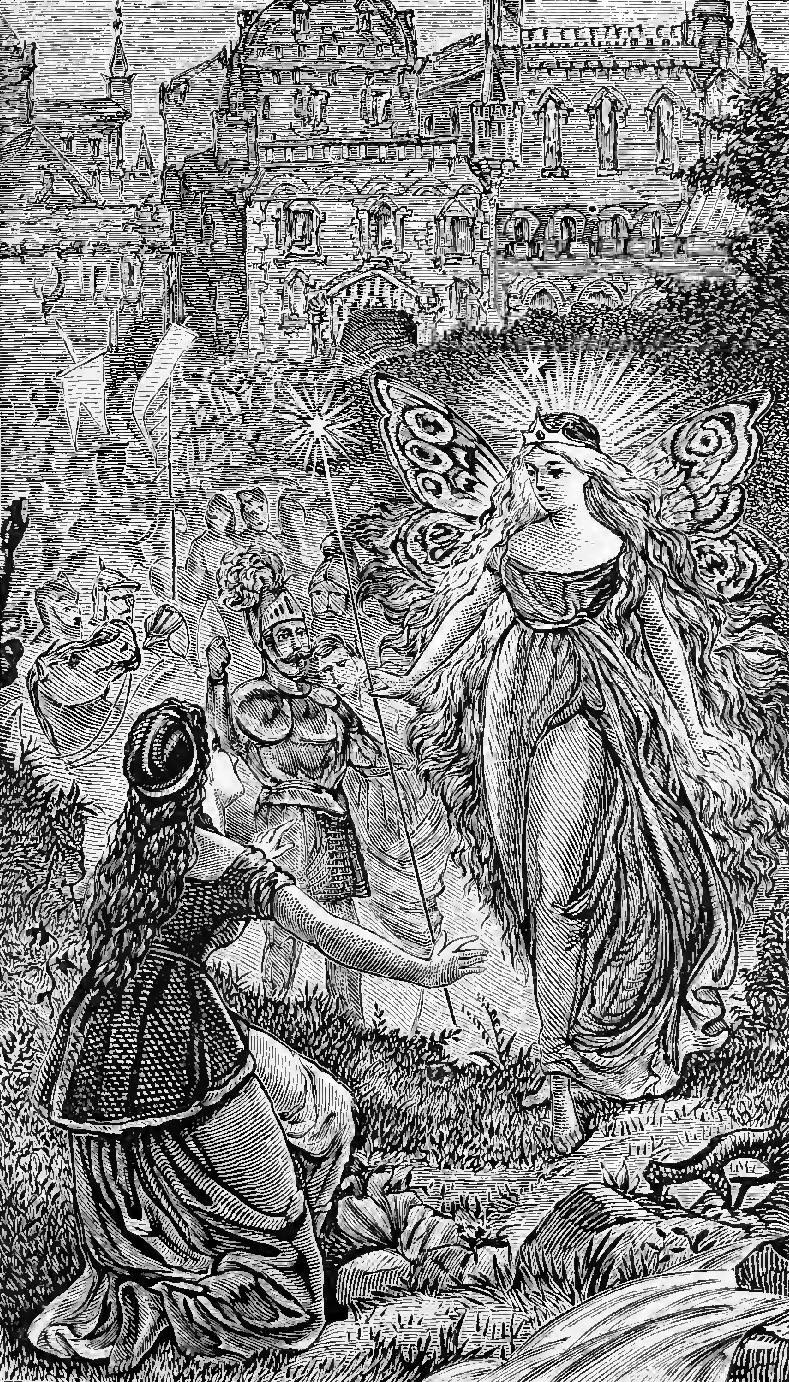
Illustration of Clíodhna in R.D. Joyce's Ballads of Irish Chivalry (1872)

In Irish mythology, Clíodhna (Clídna, Clíodna, Clíona, sometimes anglicised to Cleena) is a Queen of the Banshees of the Tuatha Dé Danann. Clíodna of Carrigcleena is the potent banshee that rules as queen over the sióga (fairies) of South Munster, or Desmond.

In some Irish myths, Clíodhna is a goddess of love and beauty, and the patron of County Cork. She is said to have three brightly coloured birds who eat apples from an otherworldly tree and whose sweet song heals sickness.

She had her palace in the heart of a pile of rocks, 5 mi (8.0 km) from Mallow, which is still commonly known by the name of Carrig-Cleena, and numerous legends about her are told among the Munster peasantry who considered her their benefactor.

== Associated families and legends ==
In general, it has been observed that Clíona is especially associated with old Irish families of Munster. Clíona has long been associated with the lands that had been the territory of the Ui-Fidgheinte (O'Donovans and O'Collins) during their period of influence (circa 373 A.D. to 977 A.D.), or were later associated with what had been the Ui-Fidghente territory (MacCarthys and FitzGeralds).

Clíodhna is also associated with the MacCarthy dynasty of Desmond, who adopted her as their fairy woman, and the O'Keeffes and FitzGerald dynasty, with whom she has had amorous affairs

Surviving traditions of Clíodhna in narrative and poetry associate her with the O'Keeffes (Ó Caoimh or Keefer) and O'Donovans. The latter, originally from Uí Fidgenti in North Munster with its own traditions, where their original goddess was Mongfind, later moved south to Carbery on Cuan Dor Harbour, Clíodhna's traditional abode on the South Munster coast, and she then features in poetry associated with them. The O'Keeffe narrative tradition is more extensive, and Clíodhna has other Desmond associations too.

Irish revolutionary Michael Collins also had knowledge of Clíodhna. Stories were told of her in the Rosscarbery school he attended, and they took Sunday trips to Clíodhna's rock. Collins was descended from the Ó Coileáins of Uí Chonaill Gabra. Both the Ui Chonaill and the Ui Donnobhans were tribes within the Ui-Fidghente.

=== Cleena's Wave ===
This legend is recorded in Acallam na Senórach ("Colloquy of the Ancients"), longest-surviving work of medieval Irish literature. During the time of the Fianna lived Ciabham of the Curling Hair, son of the King of Ulster. Ciabham decided to leave Ireland by currach (boat) but encountered great white waves as big as mountains. He was saved from the sea by a rider on a dark grey horse with a golden bridle. They then reached Tír Tairngire ("the land of promise"), an otherworldly land ruled by Manannan their king. Ciabham is entertained at a feast within Manannan's city. The chief druid Gebann had a daughter named Cleena of the Fair Hair. When she saw Caibhan, she fell in love with him and agreed to leave with him the next day.

Together they sailed to Teite's Strand in Ireland. Ciabhan went on shore to hunt and left Cleena in the boat. However, the people of Manannan pursued them in ships. One of them treacherously played music which caused Cleena to fall asleep. Then a great wave came and swept her away. The place was then called Tonn Chlíodhna, "Clíodhna's Wave", which is near Glandore harbour. Whether she drowns or not depends on the version being told, along with many other details of the story.

=== The Voyage of Teigue, Son of Cian ===
The Book of Lismore tells that Teigue was the son and heir of Cian, the king of West Munster. During a raid by an enemy from a far off land, many of their people were abducted and enslaved. Teigue and his warriors set out to rescue them. After rowing for nine weeks, they arrived in a strange land called Inis Derglocha (Red loch island). There Teigue meets a number of luminaries from Ireland's mythical past. The final person they encounter introduces herself as "Cleena Fairhead, daughter of Genann mac Treon of the tuatha dé Danann, sweetheart of Eochaid Redweapon's son Ciabhan of the curling locks; for now some time I am in this island, and from me 'Cleena's Wave' in the borders of Munster is denominated". She gives them three birds to guide them and provide music, as well as an emerald cup that transforms water into wine. She warns that if Teigue is parted from the cup, he will die soon after.

Teigue and his warriors depart the island and after rescuing their kinsmen, they return home victorious.

=== The legend of O'Keeffe, the Druid and his two daughters ===
In the early eighth century, in Feur-magh-Feine (now Fermoy) there lived Draoi Ruadh, the last of the Druids. He had assisted the King of Munster by summoning a great storm to drive back their enemies. As a reward for his service, the king had granted the Druid the title Prince of Fermoy. The Druid had two accomplished and beautiful daughters: the elder was called Cleena who could transform creatures to any form she pleased and was titled "the queen of the fairies". The younger daughter was called Aoivil (Aibell) and was her inseparable companion.

Caiov (O'Keeffe) was a prince accomplished in mind and body, who had inherited a neighboring territory. He was in the habit of visiting the Druid's palace and liked to join in the sports in which he was often victorious. This attracted the admiration of the Druid and his daughters. Both sisters fell in love with O'Keeffe. Cleena expressed her love openly and discussions began with her father for their marriage. Aoivil secretly fell in love and worked to gain his affection by her innocent arts. Caiov fell deeply in love with Aoivil but this was quickly discovered by Cleena.

Because of her jealousy, Cleena called on the oldest of her nurses to curse her innocent sister. Aoivil was stricken with sickness and the loss of her beauty. Cleena pretended to help her by a powerful sleep mixture, which caused Aoivil's apparent death. Aoivil was laid in a coffin and displayed before the Druid and his wife, who were filled with profound sorrow. She was then laid to rest in a tomb under the palace. Cleena and the nurse entered the tomb by a secret entrance and moved the still unconscious Aoivil to the cave at Castlecor (5 mi (8.0 km) north-east of Kanturk). When revived, Aoivil was told she would be imprisoned there until she forgot about Caiov. Cleena, seeing it may be impossible to make Aoivil forget, and in a fit of jealousy, she transformed Aoivil into a beautiful white cat. Cleena magically changed the cave into a palace, so her sister may bear her suffering more easily. The cave at Castlecor was said to be filled with treasures of gold and silver, watched over by a white cat that sat on a throne. Cleena told Aoivil that Caiov had fallen in battle with the Danes but Aoivil remained in love with him. For the space of one week a year at midsummer, Aoivil transformed back to her true form. Visitors to the cave sometimes saw the cat residing in the palace surrounded by treasure but were forced out by a mighty wind or invisible force.

When Caiov heard of her supposed death, he was filled with sorrow. The Druid and his wife were overcome with grief and brought them to an untimely grave. After due time, Caiov and Cleena were married with much rejoicing. Together they had three children and lived in happiness. However, the old nurse fell dangerously ill and her conscience forced her to confess everything to Caiov. The prince went to Cleena but she refused to release her sister. Cleena admitted she was unable to return her sister to her true form as she had lost her precious wand. This caused an irreconcilable division between Caiov and Cleena and after some time she retired to her fairy palace at Carrigcleena. Caiov would often come to ask forgiveness and for the release of Aoivil. Cleena remained unable to lift the enchantment but it is said that if one were to come that truly loved Aoivil more than her treasures, the enchantment would be lifted. Cleena still visits Aoivil and while Aoivil briefly resumes her human form, sisters are happy together.

=== The legend of Ellen O'Brien and Fiz-Gerald ===
Fiz-Gerald was a youthful chieftain who lived by the banks of the Shannon, County Limerick. He was widely known to be brave, hospitable and generous, as well as an accomplished harp player.

Ellen O'Brien was the only daughter from a chief whose power had crumbled under the Saxon invasion. Fitz-Gerald loved her and stole her heart with his harp playing.

Cleena also desired Fiz-Gerald and resolved to bring him to her unseen hall. On a festival day, a dark cloud descended, enveloped Fiz-Gerald and carried him away. For months, no trace of him could be found and it was generally believed he was taken by enchantment. None felt greater sorry than Ellen O'Brien, who sought the help of a wizard that lived in Kerry who communed with beings from the other world. The wizard told her that Fiz-Gerald had been taken to Cleena's favorite residence at Carrigcleena. Ellen travelled to that place and pleaded in poetry for Cleena to release her lover. She also appealed to Cleena's kindness and pledged to die at the foot of the rock if she was denied. Cleena was moved by Ellen's plea and released Fitz-Gerald. They departed and were married and afterward had many happy children.

=== The legend of John Fitzjames and Isabel Butler ===
In 1736, the wedding of John Fitzjames (Fitzgerald) and Isabel Butler was held. As the wedding was nearing its end, dancing and feasting was underway. Then, as if struck by lightning, John dropped dead at Isabel's feet. All in attendance were shocked and it was generally believed he had been transported in spirit to Fairyland.

Friends and associates of the couple attempted to make contact with Fairies to try to bring him back. Caitileen Dubh Keating and her daughter Caitileen Oge traveled to Carrigcleana to contact Cleena. They covered their clothes in tar and roll themselves in feathers of different colors. They saw Cleena face-to-face and the demanded the return of John but Cleena firmly refused, saying she would keep him for herself. While there are a number of versions of the story, Robert D. Joyce's poem has a happy ending with Cleena releasing the groom named Gerald Fitzgerald, Earl of Desmond. In one version, Caitileen Oge was the bride.

=== The Blarney Stone ===
The most traditional story of the famous Blarney Stone involves Clíodhna. Cormac Laidir MacCarthy, the builder of Blarney Castle, being involved in a lawsuit, appealed to Clíodhna for her assistance. She told him to kiss the first stone he found in the morning on his way to court, and he did so, with the result that he pleaded his case with great eloquence and won. Thus the Blarney Stone is said to impart "the ability to deceive without offending". He then incorporated it into the parapet of the castle. To be fair, Clíodhna does not take credit for all the blarney of the MacCarthys. Queen Elizabeth noted in frustration that she could not effect a negotiation with Cormac MacCarthy, whose seat was Blarney Castle, as everything he said was 'Blarney, as what he says he does not mean'.

=== John O'Donovan ===
Irish antiquarian John O’Donovan claimed that Cleena visited to lament his grandfather's death in 1798.

== Carrigcleena ==
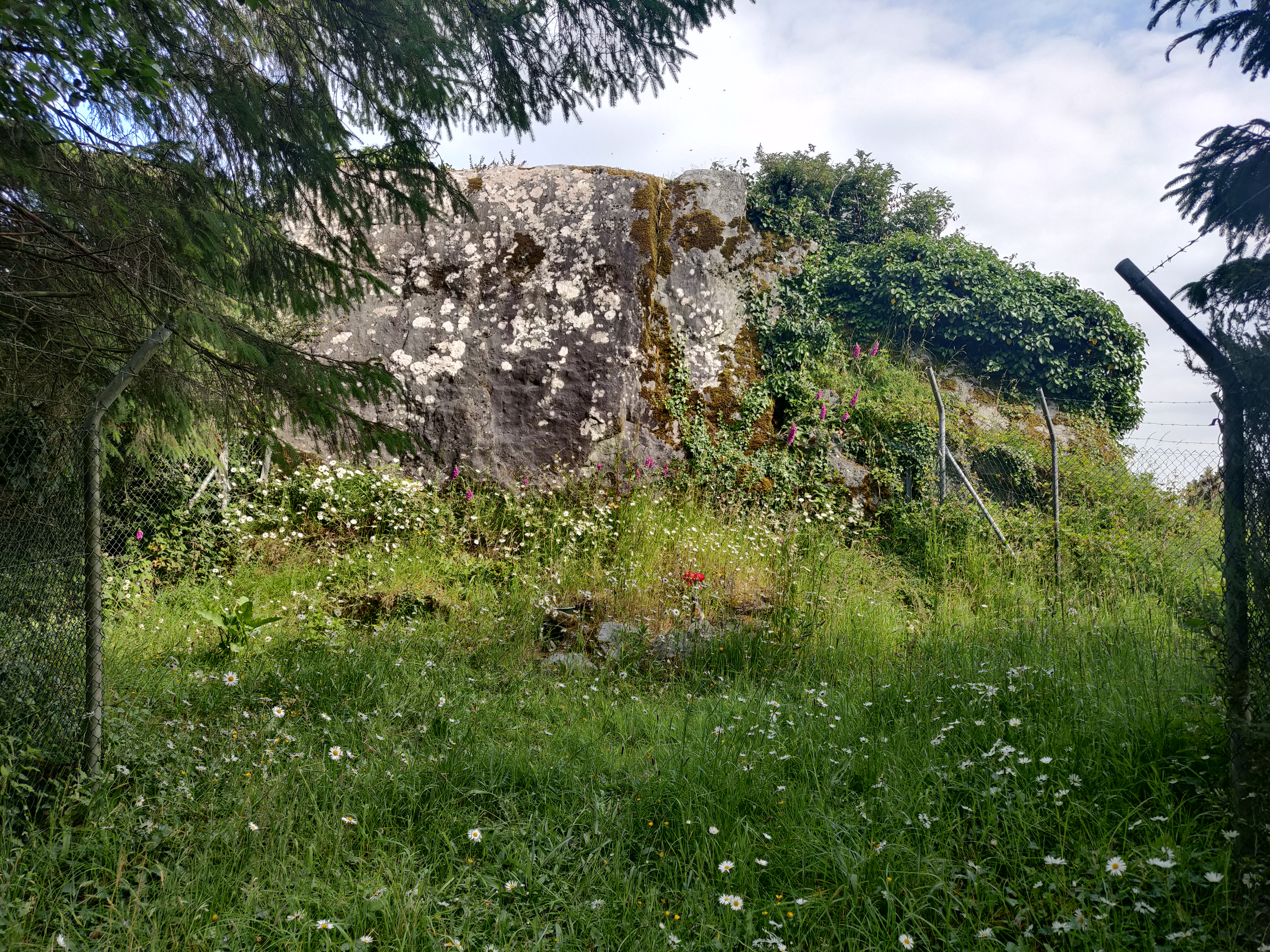
Carrigcleena is an outcrop of rocks near Mallow that is said to contain Clíodhna's palace.

Carrigcleena, meaning Cleena's rock, is a natural rock feature about 5 mi (8.0 km) south of Mallow. It was long considered as sacred ground by the local peasantry as Cliodhna's principal palace. It consisted of rough ramparts of rocks encircling about a 2 acres (0.81 ha) circle of green land. The encircling rocks rose about 20 feet (6.1 m) above the neighboring fields and occurred in a number of separate groups. Among the rocks were many caves of various sizes. One large square stone in the south east corner had some resemblance to an enormous door. A line of stones divide the inner area approximately in half. The outcrop is a very restricted occurrence of Devonian volcanic rocks. The place was described as having a "melancholy, lonesome and frightful appearance" and being "strange and romantic".

According to folklore, fairies would assemble quarterly at Carrigcleena for their amusement and to conduct their business. Legends say fairies could be seen "with the light of the declining moon in their May dance, and Cleena at their head in the most splendid attire".

Only a small portion of the original rock outcrop remains, the rest being destroyed by quarrying. The remaining rock is only accessible via a short spur extending from the south wall of the quarry.

Cleena was said to have several other residences including one at Tonn-Cliodhna, "Cleena's Wave" in Glandore.

== Origins ==
It has been suggested by J. O'Beirne Crowe that Clídna derives from the Gaulish goddess Clutonda or Clutondae

== In other media ==
Clíona is referred to as an unwelcome pursuer in Edward Walsh's poem, O’Donovan’s Daughter. And, in an ode by Muldowny O'Morrison praising Donel O'Donovan upon his accession to the chiefship of Clancahill, he is referred to as the "Dragon of Clíodhna".

In the comic opera The Emerald Isle; or, The Caves of Carrig-Cleena, a woman disguises herself as Clíodhna to deceive occupying English soldiers.

The banshee queen Clíodhna herself features as a playable goddess in the MOBA Smite (video game) as the Celtic pantheon's assassin, released in October 2021.

The name is used occasionally as a female given name e.g. for Cliodhna Cussen the Irish sculptor and for Aisling Clíodhnadh O'Sullivan (Aisling Bea).

== See also ==
- Banshee
- Baobhan sith
- Leanan sídhe
- LÉ Cliona (03)
