= O'Donovan family =

Irish family

Ó Donnabháin
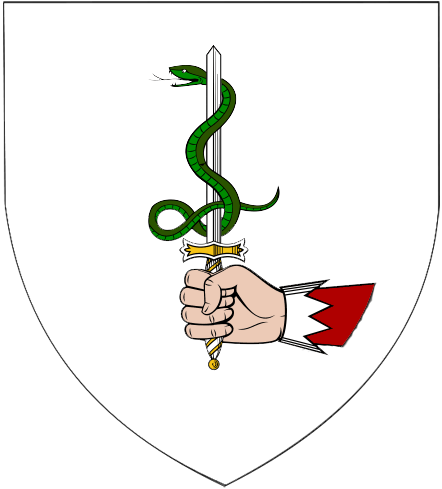
- Parent house: Uí Fidgenti
- Country: Ireland
- Titles: Ancient: King of Uí Fidgenti; King of Uí Cairbre Áebda; King of Ressad; Later sept titles: Lord of Clancahill; Lord of Clanloughlin; MacEnesles; O'Donovan of Doneraile; O'Hea

The O'Donovan family is an ancient Irish noble family. Their patronymic surname derives from Irish Ó Donnabháin, meaning the grandsons or descendants of Donnubán, referring to the 10th century ruler of the Uí Fidgenti, Donnubán mac Cathail. During the 12th and 13th century, O'Donovan relations relocated from the Bruree/Croom area south to the Kingdom of Desmond and to Carbery, where they were a ruling family for centuries and played a role in the establishment of a feudal society under the MacCarthys. Other septs retreated into the southeast corner of the Ui Fidgheinte territory, reaching from Broadford/Feenagh to the Doneraile area. The northern septs of the O'Donovans did not use a White Rod as the family's position in their original territory was vastly eroded, while several septs of O'Donovans in the southwest territories were semi-autonomous flatha under the MacCarthy Reagh dynasty in Carbery, with the most notable being local petty kings. The family were counted among the leading Gaelic nobility of Ireland.

== Foundation ==
According to historian C. Thomas Cairney, the O'Donovans were one of the chiefly families of the Uí Fidgenti who were a tribe of the Erainn who were the second wave of Celts to settle in Ireland between about 500 and 100 BC.

The Donovans were an ancient Gaelic Irish sept, ÓDonnubán; anglicised O'Donovan. The Clans can be traced back to the descendants of the 10th century Donnubán mac Cathail (t980), son of Cahall, ruler of the Irish regional or sub-provincial kingdom of Ui-Fidgenti. The Ui-Fidgheinte reached from Muscry Ganogh, west of Kilmallock through the plains of the Shannon, and included Adare, Askearton, Croom, Bruree and [Newcastle] Kenry. Donnubán mac Cathail, Lord of Uí Fidgenti married the daughter of his norse ally, Ivar of Limerick of the Uí Ímair. His son Cathal mac Donnubán also ruled the smaller kingdom of Uí Chairbre Áebda. From Donnubán mac Cathail accession to the kingship in 962 to the death of Amlaíb Ua Donnubáin in 1201, the family operated as a semi-independent to sometimes fully independent regional ruling house within the kingdom of Munster.

== Two Carberys ==
An ancient race in Munster, a portion of the O'Donovans became Cairbre Eva (or Uí Chairpre, see map) within the ancient regional kingdom of the Uí Fidgenti, once approximately co-extensive with the modern County Limerick, and were for many centuries allies of the Eóganachta, to whom they were related by common descent from Ailill Flann Bec (or Ailill Aulom). Although allowed to be princely in multiple ancient sources, in the Irish class structure the Uí Fidgenti were only middle tier among the ruling septs of the land, as they never contested for the kingship of the greater provincial kingdom of Munster, in which they were located. However, the Uí Fidgenti did not pay tribute to the Eóganachta kings of Cashel. The Book of Rights, transcribed as a medieval topographical poem set forth the rights of the O'Donovans:

Dual d O Donnabáin Dhúin Cuirc
an tír si, na tír longphuirt;
fa leis gan cíos fon Maigh moill,
is na cláir síos co Sionoinn.

Hereditary to O Donnabhain of Dun Cuirc
Is this land, as a land of encampment;
To him, without tribute, belonged [the land] along the sluggish Maigh.
And the plains down to the Sionainn.

Their extensive territory followed Limerick's River Maigue, before the Dál gCais and O'Brien dynasty, and later the FitzGerald dynasty, forced them out of their territory between the late 12th and mid-13th century. O'Donovans were noted as taking refuge in 1169 in County Kerry, but were also noted as being in their historical territory near Bruree and Croom in the mid-1200s. The relocation of some O'Donovans to Carbery in the later County Cork, appears to have occurred during the mid to late 13th century, primarily through their association with the MacCarthy Reagh sept. The majority of O'Donovans were associated with the MacCarthy Reagh sept, although considerable documentation exists that some O'Donovans maintained relations with groups hostile to the MacCarthy Reaghs, including other MacCarthy septs (MacCarthy Mor and MacCarthy of Muscry) and Anglo-Irish rulers (Earls of Desmond and Kildare). Only the O'Donovan chiefs of territories south of Kilmallock were inaugurated by the MacCaarthy Reagh; the O'Donovan chiefs of Bruree and territories north of Kilmallock were inaugurated by their Fidgheinte kinsmen. The O'Donovans in Carbery may have been joined by a junior sept of their Ó Coileáin kinsmen from Uí Chonaill Gabra. A large number of O'Donovans of Carbery and Cork may also descend from the Dunavans of the Corca Laidghe, which was a completely different, and perceived as inferior (less royal) race than the descendants of Eoghan Mor.

Later, the title Prince of Carbery (Cairbre) would be adopted by the MacCarthy Reaghs, although there is significant doubt as to whether this is actually derived from the former tribal name of the O'Donovans (Ui Chairpre of the Ui Fidgente), and if so, then what circumstances led to it being extended well beyond the territories belonging to the O'Donovans. In any case, the Carberry septs of the Donovans were junior to the MacCarthy Reaghs, from whom they received the White Wand. The leading family of the Carbery O'Donovans, Clann Cathail, paid to their overlords a surprisingly small, economically insignificant rent, but the precise reason for this is lost to history. Possibly earlier times were recalled, or it may be due to the special relationship they developed with Fíngin Reanna Róin Mac Carthaig (see below).

Reverend John Begley (see references), of St. Munchin's, gives an account of the Christianization of the Norse of Limerick by the O'Donovans, and their long intermarriage. Mainchín of Limerick is the patron saint of the Diocese of Limerick and Bruree, and he may have been adopted by the Norse of Limerick city from the family. Begley argues that he was, but the O'Briens also claimed him indirectly at some point and obviously have their own supporters.

The longphorts were the Viking ship fortresses and later settlements, although the term soon enough came to mean simply encampment. However, the original meaning remained in usage and in the 10th century there were at least two Norse longphuirt, extensions of Limerick, which were deep in Uí Chairpre controlled territory.

Many Irish families intermarried with the Scandinavians, but it was a question of degree. In their case the O'Donovans simply took a particularly large dose. Nearly all of the long history of the Danes in Munster has been lost, although those living in Uí Chairpre are not known to have left, being last noted in Donnubán's company in 978. The later advent of the Norman invasion of Ireland ruined them as a political class. For the fate of the Limerick Norse see History of Limerick. Only the Cotter family of East Cork continue to prosper today in Ireland, but they are not of Limerick provenance.

From the later 16th century Scandinavian names have been very little used by the O'Donovan family, when once they were as popular as the Gaelic. But see the important Ímar Ua Donnubáin.

=== Final ancient deeds ===
The O'Donovans are first found associated with the MacCarthys only four years after the death of Amlaíb. The Annals of Inisfallen report that in 1205

AI1205.3: Cellachán son of Mac Carthaig, i.e. the son of Cathal Odar, was slain by the mounted horse of Domnall, son of Mac Carthaig, i.e. by the followers of Donnocán and by Ua Donnubáin of Uí Chairpri.

The political influence of the O'Donovans with the Ui Chairbre decreased as the Mac Carthy influence increased, and then splintered. By 1232, certain septs of the MacCarthys ruled from where they had relocated to the south of the historical territory of the Ui Fidghente, and controlled the Ui Chairbre. In 1260 the O'Donovans are found raiding Norman lands alongside none other than Fíngin Reanna Róin Mac Carthaig, according to Norman documents. This was one year before his famous victory at the Battle of Callann, where the O'Donovans of Ui Chairbre are also believed to have been at his side. In 1259 he aided them in a fight against the O'Mahonys, who appear to have been blamed for the slaying of Crom Ua Donnubáin.

Up until this period the O'Donovans and O'Mahonys are generally regarded to have been allies, their ancestors Máel Muad mac Brain and Donnubán having joined forces against the Dál gCais in the 10th century. In 1283, following an attempted coup within the MacCarthy, a number of MacCarthys and some O'Donovans migrated into new territory adjacent to the O'Sullivans, which commenced a long and tumultuous relationship between O'Donovans and both major septs of the O'Sullivans, and which has included both minor warfare as well as intermarriage over the next four centuries.

== Later history ==
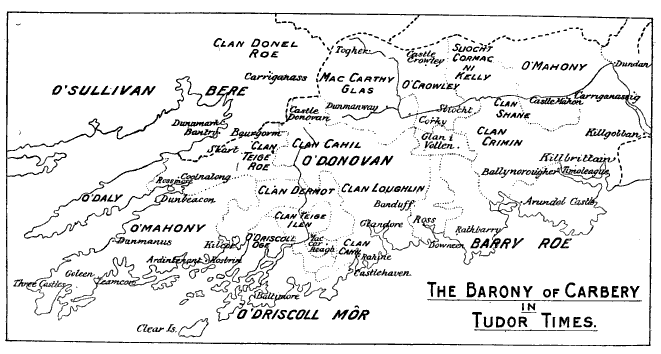
Carbery in Tudor times

Following an active 13th century, and after their move south the O'Donovans of Ui Chairbre fall into relative obscurity for approximately two centuries, primarily because the records for .Munster during this period are few. Fragmenting into several smaller-sized lordships, they became subordinate to their overlord, MacCarthy Reagh, who was at odds with the MacCarthy Mor, who was at odds with the MacCarthys of Muscrery, who were at odds with both the Norman settlers (Barrys) and the old Irish (O'Callahan, O'Keefe), and with Gaelicized Normans (Fitzgeralds- Earls of Desmonds, FitzGibbons – Earls of Kildare and the White Knight), all of whom were or were not, depending on changing politics, at odds with the English monarchs.

O'Donovans of Ui Chairpre reappeared in various annals and records about 1500. Domhnall Ó Donnabháin was Bishop of Ross in the mid-late 15th century, while Donal mac Melaghlin O'Donovan, was killed for piracy, along with his O'Driscoll accomplices, by the lords of the O'Driscolls in 1551.

However, despite similar obscurity for an extended period, an O'Donovan sept (the remnants of the Ui Donabhain of the Ui Fidghente, holding territory in Synnagh-Donovan near Doneraile, were still counted among the 64 leading Gaelic families in all of Ireland in the mid-16th century Book of Howth list, with their Chief noted as being the Chief Irish of his countrie (i.e. region).

=== Clancahill ===
Following the migration of some of the O'Donovans of the Ui Chairpre into Cork and the death of Ancrom O'Donovan in 1254, few Munster records survived which provides information on the history of the Ui Chairpre O'Donovans for the next three centuries. But when they reappear in the mid-16th century they are found in a similar state as other septs in Ireland at that time: rival branches assassinating each other and each supported by more distantly related septs. It appears that by a fortuitous marriage to an O'Leary of Carrignacurra and the ardent support of Clan Aneslis that the branch of the celebrated Donal of the Hides were able to set aside their rivals, in the person of Diarmaid an Bhairc ("Dermot of the Bark", meaning born at sea), who were supported by Ire (Ivor) O'Donovan [Ó Donnabháin Íomhair] of the Sliocht Íomhair ("Seed of Ivor"), descendants of the legendary Ímar Ua Donnubáin, younger son of Cathal, and also by the Sliocht Tioboit ("Seed of Toby"), another distinguished sept of Clancahill. In a terrible local conflict occurring in Rosscarbery in 1560, where Diarmaid was being inaugurated with the White Wand by the MacCarthy Reagh, Donal, with Clan Aneslis and a contingent of O'Learys, stormed the town, slaying Diarmaid and a great number of the Sliocht Íomhair at the start, and others of his followers were soon found and slaughtered in the streets of the town. The MacCarthy Reagh, who would have been Cormac na Haoine MacCarthy Reagh, 10th Prince of Carbery, then inaugurated Donal na g crocieann with the White Rod, declaring him "O'Donovan", after he had just run his kinsman Diarmaid through. The story has significant doubt as to its veracity, though John O'Donovan considered it "probably true".

Ellen O'Leary and Donal na g crocieann (of the Hides) were married at Dromale, and their issue was, among other sons, Donal II O'Donovan.

Recent generations of Clancahill include Morgan William II O'Donovan and his son Morgan John Winthrop. His son Morgan Gerald Daniel O'Donovan (Murchadh Gearóid Dónal Ó Donnabháin) was born in Pau, France, in 1931, died 25 January 2016, was the son of Morgan John Winthrop O'Donovan by his wife Cornelia Bagnell (died 1974). Educated at Stowe and Trinity College, Cambridge, O'Donovan resided near Skibbereen, in West Cork. O'Donovan was a member of the General Synod of the Church of Ireland, and served as Chairman of the Standing Council of Irish Chiefs and Chieftains. He was married to Frances Jane, daughter of the late Sir Gerald Templer, with whom his father served in the Royal Irish Fusiliers. They have issue: a son, Morgan Teige Gerald (born 1961), educated at Harrow and Girton College, Cambridge and two daughters, Katharine Jane (born 1962) and Cecilia Mary Cornelia (born 1966) [married N.G.F. Chamberlain, 1996 and has issue].

O'Donovan served on the Council with O'Donoghue of the Glens, McGillycuddy of the Reeks, O'Callaghan (Tortosa), Baron Inchiquin and O'Grady, the last his distant cousin. O'Callaghan and O'Donoghue are much more distant cousins through the MacCarthys. O'Donovan was profiled and interviewed by Ellis, Curley, and Chambers, for which see the list of references below.

=== Clanloughlin and Ballymore ===
These O'Donovans are notable for many accomplishments. An important junior sept, the Donovans of Ballymore, established themselves in County Wexford. Many have distinguished themselves in political office and the military.

- Jeremiah O'Donovan (MP Baltimore)
- Juliana Donovan, Countess of Anglesey – scandalised widow of Richard Annesley, 6th Earl of Anglesey
- Edward Westby Donovan – fought in the Crimean War, later Commander of British Troops in Hong Kong. Chevalier of the Légion d'honneur.

The current representative of Clan Loughlin and the Ballymore sept is the scholar Brian Donovan of Trinity College, Dublin, a descendant of Donal Oge na Cartan O'Donovan, Lord of Clan Loughlin (died 1629). He is the CEO and co-founder of the historical research company Eneclann, based at Trinity.

== Territory in Carbery ==
Between them, Clancahill and Clan Loughlin controlled the entire harbour of Glandore, the former on the west side and the latter on the east, although before the 1560s the Clancahill portion appears to have been controlled by the Sliocht Íomhair. Clan Loughlin were seated at Cloghatradbally, now called Glandore Castle, a 13th-century Norman castle built by the Barretts, from whom they took it. This is the sacred harbour of Clíodhna.

Clancahill came to control half of Castlehaven harbour as well, the ancient O'Driscolls of Corcu Loígde in control of the other. From the ocean the territory of the O'Donovans then stretched north and northwest into the area of Drimoleague, with the well known Castle Donovan found in a valley not far from that village. This, up in the mountains, in a remote area, was the principal seat of the Clancahill main line until the early 17th century.

At what was probably their height in Carbery, between the late 16th century and their partial dispossession following the so-called Irish rebellion of 1641 and the Irish Confederate Wars in the mid 17th, the O'Donovans were in control of approximately 100,000 acres right in the center of the principality, with territories both in West and East Carbery. Of this, however, only around 15,000 acres were usable as farmland. In the remaining they were still owed rents and had the rights to hold court(s), fairs, and so on. From the several harbours and bays they controlled actually came their chief income, which was the case for lords all along the South Munster coast. Following the Cromwellian confiscations, the infamously ungrateful Charles II of England, after first giving his deceitful word he would restore them entirely, granted the vast majority to soldiers of Cromwell's army in lieu of pay. The O'Donovans would regain possession of less than one twentieth their former territories, a few thousand acres... although this was better than many Gaelic families did. The great MacCarthys Reagh lost virtually everything, receiving not enough back to even live on respectably, a few hundred acres out of the approaching 600 square miles (1,600 km^{2}) they once controlled at their height (this included the O'Donovan territories, which were at one time probably much less than 100,000 acres), so they eventually left.

Clanlouglin lost their estates twice, first the majority of the fairly immense Manor of Glandore in the 1650s to Cromwell and his soldiers, and then the Manor of the Leap, a descendant of the remains of the former, in 1737, when one of their dynasts, Jeremiah II O'Donovan, sold it.

In 1878 various branches of the O'Donovan family were reported successful (landed) and in possession of 17,213 acres of estates in several counties in southern Ireland, not counting estates and homesteads of less than 500 acres. By this time Donovans were well established in England, Australia, Canada, Argentina and the United States.

== See also ==
- Chiefs of the Name
- Clonakilty
- Donovan (disambiguation)
- Donovan (surname)
- Irish nobility
- O'Donovan (surname)
- Irish clans

== General references ==
- Begley, John, The Diocese of Limerick, Ancient and Medieval. Dublin: Browne & Nolan. 1906.
- Bugge, Alexander (ed. & tr.), Caithreim Cellachain Caisil: The Victorious Career of Cellachan of Cashel. Christiania: J. Chr. Gundersens Bogtrykkeri. 1905.
- Burke, Bernard, and Hugh Montgomery-Massingberd, Burke's Irish Family Records, or Burke's Landed Gentry of Ireland. London: Burke's Peerage Ltd. 5th edition, 1976.
- Burke, J. M., "Carbery Topographical Notes", in Journal of the Cork Historical and Archaeological Society Volume X. Second Series. 1904. pp. 204–7.
- Burke, J. M., "Kilmacabea, Co. Cork", in Journal of the Cork Historical and Archaeological Society Volume X. Second Series. 1904. pp. 213–30.
- Butler, W. F. T., "The Barony of Carbery", in Journal of the Cork Historical and Archaeological Society Volume X. Second Series. 1904. pp. 1–10, 73–84.
- Byrne, Francis J., Irish Kings and High-Kings. Four Courts Press. 2nd revised edition, 2001.
- Carroll, Michael J. and Alan Langford (illus.), The Castles and Fortified Houses of West Cork. Bantry Design Studios. 2001.
- Chambers, Anne, At Arm's Length: Aristocrats in the Republic of Ireland. New Island Books. 2nd revised edition, 2005.
- Charles-Edwards, T. M., Early Christian Ireland. Cambridge University Press. 2001.
- Cronnelly, Richard F., Irish Family History, Part II: A History of the Clan Eoghan, or Eoghanachts. Dublin: 1864. (O'Donovan pedigrees: pgs. 252-64)
- Curley, Walter J. P., Vanishing Kingdoms: The Irish Chiefs and their Families. Dublin: Lilliput Press. 2004.
- Cusack, Mary Francis, A History of the City and County of Cork. Dublin: McGlashan and Gill. 1875.
- D'Alton, John, Illustrations, Historical and Genealogical, of King James's Irish Army List, 1689. Volume II. London: J.R. Smith. 2nd edition, 1861.
- Downham, Clare, Viking Kings of Britain and Ireland: The Dynasty of Ívarr to A.D. 1014. Edinburgh: Dunedin Academic Press. 2007.
- Ellis, Peter Berresford, Erin's Blood Royal: The Gaelic Noble Dynasties of Ireland. Palgrave. Revised edition, 2002.
- FitzPatrick, Elizabeth, Royal Inauguration in Gaelic Ireland c. 1100–1600: A Cultural Landscape Study. Boydell Press. 2004.
- Ó Corráin, Donnchadh, "Caithréim Chellacháin Chaisil: History or Propaganda?", in Ériu 25 (1974): 1–69.
- O'Donovan, John (ed. & tr.), Annala Rioghachta Eireann. Annals of the Kingdom of Ireland by the Four Masters, from the Earliest Period to the Year 1616. 7 vols. Dublin: Royal Irish Academy. 2nd edition, 1856. Volume VI (pp. 2430–83)
- O'Donovan, John (ed. & tr.) and Duald Mac Firbis, The Genealogies, Tribes, and Customs of Hy-Fiachrach, Commonly Called O'Dowda's Country. Dublin: Irish Archæological Society. 1844.
- O'Donovan, Miriam, A Short History of the O'Donovan Clan: stair agus seanchas mhuintir Uí Dhonnabháin. Publisher: O'Donovan Clan. 2000.
- O'Donovan, Peadar, Irish Family Names. Skibbereen: Southern Star Newspaper. 1991. (many O'Donovan septs and nicknames included)
- O'Hart, John, Irish Pedigrees; or the Origin and Stem of the Irish Nation. 5th edition, 1892.
- Ó Murchadha, Diarmuid, Family Names of County Cork. Cork: The Collins Press. 2nd edition, 1996.
- Todd, James Henthorn (ed. & tr.), Cogadh Gaedhel re Gallaibh: The War of the Gaedhil with the Gaill. Longmans. 1867.
- Ua Súilleabháin, Seán and Seán Donnelly (eds. & trans.), and Tadhg Olltach Ó an Cháinte, "Music Has Ended: The Death of a Harper", in Celtica 22. Dublin Institute for Advanced Studies. 1991. pp. 165–75.
- Westropp, Thomas Johnson, "A Survey of the Ancient Churches in the County of Limerick", in Proceedings of the Royal Irish Academy Volume XXV, Section C (Archaeology, Linguistic, and Literature). Dublin. 1904–1905. pp. 327–480, Plates X-XVIII.
