= River Ilen =

River in West Cork, Ireland

Coordinates: 51°33′N 9°19′W

Location
- Country: Ireland

Physical characteristics
- Source
  - location: Mullaghmesha, County Cork
  - elevation: 494 m (1,621 ft)
- Mouth
  - location: Celtic Sea at Baltimore
- Length: 37 km (23 mi)
- Basin size: 301.7 km^{2} (116.5 sq mi)

The River Ilen (Irish: An Aighlinn) is a river in West Cork, Ireland. It rises at Mullaghmesha mountain and flows southwards for 37 kilometres into the Celtic Sea.

Its five main tributaries are, the Saivnose, Coarliss, Achrinduff, Glounaphuca and Clodagh. It is listed as having Quality A water, which means its pollution levels are far below the national average. Fish found in the river include brown and sea trout and Atlantic salmon. The main settlement on the river is Skibbereen. It flows into the sea at the village of Baltimore.
