= Leap, County Cork =

Village in County Cork, Ireland

Leap Irish: Léim Uí Dhonnabháin
- Village
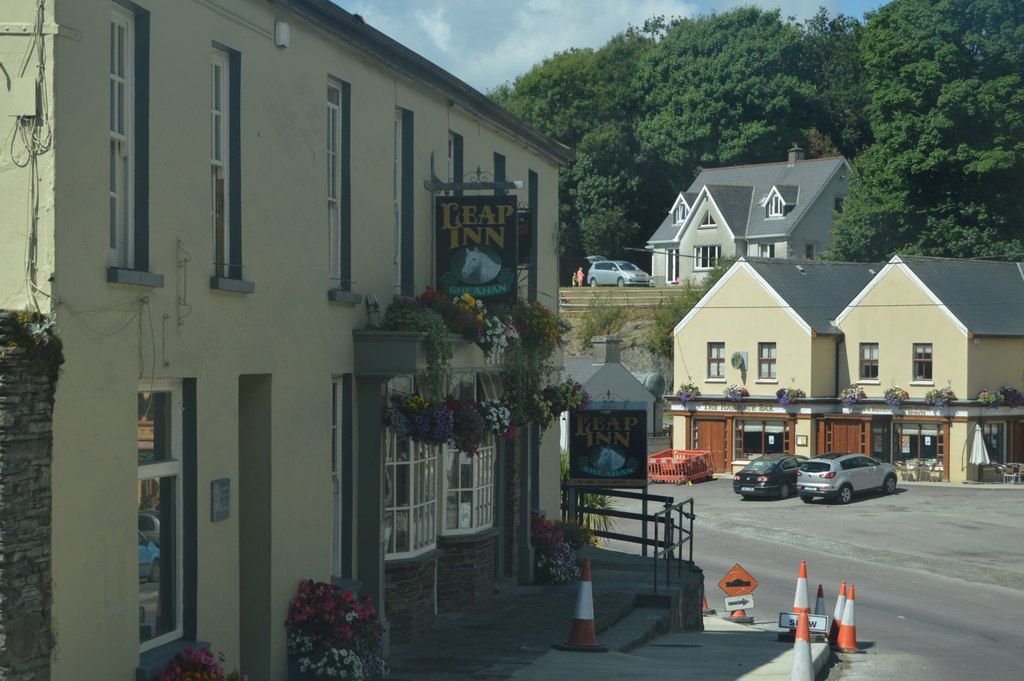
- Pubs in Leap village

- Location in Ireland
- Coordinates: 51°34′51.28″N 09°08′36.31″W
- Country: Ireland
- Province: Munster
- County: County Cork

Population (2022)
  - Total: 167
- Time zone: UTC+0 (WET)
  - Summer (DST): UTC-1 (IST (WEST))

Leap (/ˈlɛp/; Irish: Léim Uí Dhonnabháin or An Léim) is a village in County Cork, Ireland, situated at the north end of Glandore harbour, several miles inland from the seacoast. It is on the N71 road which runs through West Cork from Cork city. The village is in the parish of Kilmacabea which also includes Glandore village.

== Name and history ==
The Irish name of the village, Léim Uí Dhonnabháin, means "O'Donovan's Leap" and is reputedly derived from the story of a chieftain called O'Donovan, who was pursued by English soldiers, but escaped them by jumping across a ravine on the western side of the village.

In 1684, Jeremiah O'Donovan (MP Baltimore), Lord of Clan Loughlin, obtained letters patent from Charles II of England. His extensive landholdings in the surrounding countryside were erected into the Manor of O'Donovan's Leap, or the Manor of the Leap.

== Amenities ==
The village has four bars (of which two serve food and one which is a music venue) and a fast food diner. Connolly's of Leap has been a bar since 1810. The local Church of Ireland community is serviced by Leap Church and the Roman Catholic community by St. Mary's Church. The village also has a post office, furniture and hardware store, a petrol station and a shop.

An amenity park was opened in 2021.

There are bus services to Skibbereen and Cork city.

== See also ==
- List of towns and villages in Ireland
