= Domhnall na g-Croiceann =

Irish chieftain

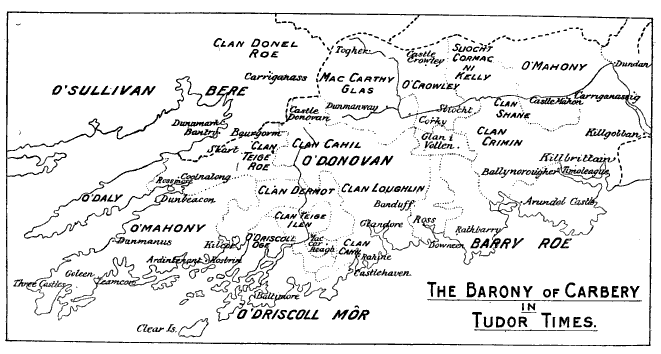
Carbery in Tudor times

Donal of the Skins or Hides (Irish: Domhnall na g-Croiceann), also called Peltry O'Donovan or simply Donal I O'Donovan (Irish: Domhnall Ó Donnabháin), was The O'Donovan Mor, Lord of Clancahill from his inauguration with the White Wand circa 1560 by the MacCarthy Reagh, Prince of Carbery, to his death in 1584. Although not recorded his inaugurator was probably Cormac na Haoine MacCarthy Reagh, 10th Prince of Carbery.

He was the son of Teige of Dromasta, The O'Donovan Mor, and Helena O'Donovan, daughter of Denis O'Donovan MacEnesles of Moyny.

He was not raised as an O'Donovan, but was instead fostered by the O'Leary of Carrignacurra. Donal married his foster father's daughter, Ellen O'Leary, and upon coming of age, pronounced himself as an O'Donovan, and seized the chieftainship by force of arms. By his marriage to Ellen, his foster sister, he had Diarmaid O'Donovan, who was hanged for raiding in their territory by the forces of Donal Cam O'Sullivan Beare in 1581, Teige and "other sons", who in 1592 were declared illegitimate (i.e., not bastards) by the Lord Chancellor Adam Loftus. He was followed in the chieftainship of Clan Cahill by his son, Donal, upon his death in 1584. His son Donal II O'Donovan was recognized as chief of Clan Cahill by his then father in law, MacCarthy Reagh. The younger Teige attempted to contest the succession, alleging Donal II was a bastard, but failed in his attempt.

== Epithet ==
Donal's epithet na g-Croiceann or "of the Skins" is believed to come from his being, when a child, wrapped by his mother in cow hides to protect him from the enemies of his father.

== Life ==
Donal is best known for allegedly slaughtering approximately fifteen of his own kinsfolk, and dispossessing still more, to become O'Donovan, Lord of Clancahill. The events as they have come down to later generations are as follows.

=== Fostered by O'Leary ===
Donal of the hides (or Domhnall Na-g-Croiceann), so called from having been wrapped in a cow-hide when an infant by his mother [Helena] to escape from the claimants to the chieftainship of Clan-Cathal, who conspired to murder him. Helena and the infant were taken to O'Leary Castle ‘Masters’ in the parish of Inchageelah, in Ibh-Leary, after Teige O’Donovan, his father, was murdered. O'Leary of Carrignacurra gave refuge to Helena and the infant. Donal was not raised as an O'Donovan, but was instead fostered by the O'Leary of Carrignacurra as his son. Donal married his foster father's daughter, Ellen O'Leary of Carrignacurra, in 1540. Ellen O'Leary daughter of O'Leary of Carrignacurra, is believed to have come with a substantial dowry, which significantly improved Donal's fortunes.

They were married at the Church of Drumali [Ellen 1522-1590 was aged 18 when she married]. Donal married Ellen O'Leary after having by her Diarmaid O'Donovan ‘Dermod’. Their later issue was, among other sons, Donal II O'Donovan. Upon coming of age, Donal pronounced himself as an O'Donovan, and seized the chieftainship by force of arms. Assisted by O’Leary’s family and followers, together with Denis Meeny O’Donovan and MacConnolly.

=== Diarmaid an Bhairc ===
Diarmaid O'Donovan was slain by Donal O’Sullivan Beare in 1581 following a raid urged by English Queen Elizabeth I into O’Sullivan territory.

Preceded by Teige of Dromasta	O'Donovan; Lord of Clancahill; 1560–1584	Succeeded by Donal II O'Donovan
