= White Rod =

Irish and Scottish symbol of authority

The White Rod, White Wand, Rod of Inauguration, or Wand of Sovereignty, in the Irish language variously called the slat na ríghe (rod of kingship) and slat tighearnais (rod of lordship), was the primary symbol of a Gaelic king or lord's legitimate authority and the principal prop used in his inauguration ceremony. First documented in the 12th century Life of Máedóc of Ferns, but assumed to have been used long before then, it is last documented in Ireland in the early 17th century. In Scotland the rod was used into the 13th century for the inauguration of its last Gaelic-speaking kings, and for the Norse-Gaelic Lords of the Isles into the 15th.

While the reception of the rod was in origin a Gaelic cultural feature, following the Viking and Norman invasion of Ireland some foreign families became significantly Gaelicised. A notable example were the great Hiberno-Norman De Burgh magnates styled Mac William Íochtar, who had become completely Gaelicised, ruled over their followers as Irish clan chiefs, and received the White Rod.

== Qualities and symbolism ==
The rod was required to be both white and straight, with the colour representing purity and the straightness of justice, according to the account given by Geoffrey Keating.

Even after the collapse of all other institutions of Gaelic Ireland, the Chief Poet of a district, who presided well into 18th-century Munster over the district's Cúirt, a poetic court similar to the Welsh Eisteddfod, would receive a Staff of Office (Irish: Bata na Bachaille), which would later be handed down to his successor.

== Ceremony ==
Although the meaning and purpose were always the same, the particulars of the ceremony appear to have varied across the Gaelic world. Most notably, who presented the new lord or king with the rod depended on the history and traditions of each kingdom.

A note to the pedigree of the O'Mahonys at Lambeth, written by Sir George Carew, circa 1600/3:

O'Mahon's country doeth follow the ancient Tanist law of Ireland; and unto whom Mac Carthy Reagh shall give a white rod, he is O'Mahon, or Lord of the Country; but the giving of the rod avails nothing except he be chosen by the followers, nor yet the election without the rod. The MacCarthy Reagh was inaugurated with the same ceremonial with which he inaugurated the O'Mahon and other dependent chiefs. There was a grievance attached to this, and it did not escape the keen eyes of the Cork juries, who presented: 'That when any Lord or Gentleman of the Irishry within this county, is made Lord or Captain of his name or kindredtie, he taketh of every inhabitant, freeholder, and tenant under him, a cow to be paid for erecting a rod in that name.

While describing how Hugh Roe O'Donnell was inaugurated on 3 May 1592, Timothy T. O'Donnell has written:

"The inauguration of the O'Donnell as King of Tyrconnell was both civil and religious in nature. The ceremony took place on the great Rock of Doon which is one mile west of Kilmacrenan, from which one is give a breathtaking view of the surrounding country. It began with the religious rites in the church of the nearby monastery and holy well singing Psalms and hymns in honor of Christ and St. Columba for the success of the Prince's sovereignty. Standing on the Rock surrounded by nobles and his clansmen, the Prince received an oath in which he promised to preserve the Church and the laws of the land. The Prince also vowed to deliver the succession of the realm peacefully to his Tanist (his successor). O'Ferghil, the hereditary warden and abbot of Kilmacrenan, performed the religious ceremony of the inauguration of The O'Donnell. O'Gallagher was the Prince's Marshal and O'Clery was the Ollamh, or scholarly lawyer who presented to him the book containing the laws and customs of the land and the straight white wand symbolizing the moral rectitude demanded of his judgments and rule."

== Parliament of Scotland ==
Prior to the Union with England in 1707, there was a Gentleman Usher of the White Rod in the Estates of Parliament in Edinburgh, who had a similar role to the Gentleman Usher of the Black Rod in the Parliaments of England, the Kingdom of Great Britain and then the United Kingdom.

The Heritable Usher of the White Rod is the only example of an office of the Crown becoming incorporated as a company. The Walker Trust Act, 1877, incorporated the office into the Walker Trustees, entitling the trustees to charge dues from anyone receiving an honour from the Crown. In 1908 the Society of Knights Bachelor was formed to contest this right, but a Court of Session case the following year confirmed the right of the Walker Trustees to charge recipients of honours. However, the Society of Knights Bachelor won an appeal to the House of Lords in 1911.

The Lord Bishop of Edinburgh, as ex officio chair of the Walker Trustees, is the Heritable Usher of the White Rod, but the role carries no duties.

== See also ==
- Gaelic nobility of Ireland
- Tullyhogue Fort
- Royal sites of Ireland
- Lord Great Chamberlain
- Lord High Steward of Ireland
- Peerage
- Sceptre

== Sources ==
- Bannerman, John, "The King's Poet and the Inauguration of Alexander III", in The Scottish Historical Review Vol. 68, No. 186, Part 2 (Oct. 1989): 120–149.
- Bannerman, John, "The Residence of the King's Poet", in Scottish Gaelic Studies XVII (1996): 24–35.
- Book of Clanranald, ed. & tr. Alexander Cameron, in Reliquiæ Celticæ. Vol. II. Inverness. 1894. pp. 138–309.
- Dillon, Myles, "The consecration of Irish kings", in Celtica 10 (1973): 1–8.
- FitzPatrick, Elizabeth, "An Tulach Tinóil"
- FitzPatrick, Elizabeth, Royal Inauguration in Gaelic Ireland c. 1100–1600: A Cultural Landscape Study. Boydell Press. 2004.
- Green, Alice Stopford, The Making of Ireland and its Undoing: 1200–1600. London: Macmillan. 1908.
- Geoffrey Keating, Foras Feasa ar Éirinn (circa 1634), ed. & tr. David Comyn and Patrick S. Dinneen (1902–1914). The History of Ireland by Geoffrey Keating. Irish Texts Society. edition and translation available from CELT.
- Kingston, Simon, Ulster and the Isles in the Fifteenth Century: the Lordship of the Clann Domhnaill of Antrim. Dublin: Four Courts Press. 2004.
- Mitchel, John, The Life and Times of Aodh O'Neill, Prince of Ulster. New York: Excelsior Catholic Publishing House. 1879.
- Nicholls, K. W., Gaelic and Gaelicized Ireland in the Middle Ages. Dublin: Lilliput Press. 2nd edition, 2003.
- O'Donovan, John (ed.), and Duald Mac Firbis, The Genealogies, Tribes, and Customs of Hy-Fiachrach. Dublin: Irish Archaeological Society. 1844. pp. 425–452.
