= Togher Castle =

Tower house, County Cork, Ireland

- County Cork, Ireland
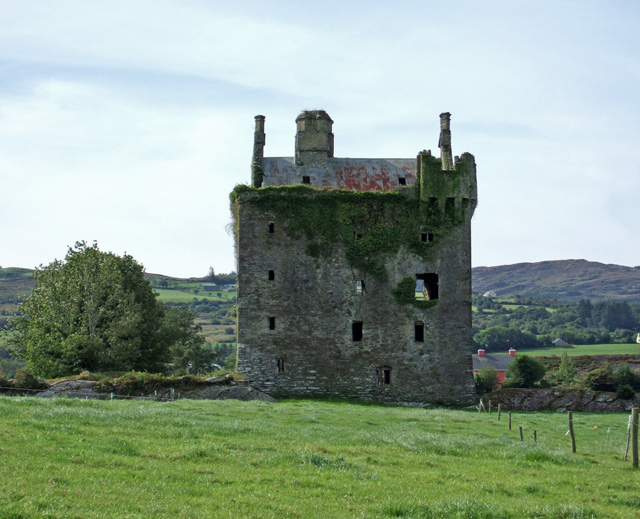
- Togher Castle – south facade

Site information
- Type: Fortified tower house
- Controlled by: MacCarthy family of Gleannacroim; Captain Edward Hoare and Lieutenant Abraham Hoare; The Barry family The O'Donovan family
- Condition: Partial ruin

Location
- Coordinates: 51.761869°N 09.164867°W
- Height: 18 metres (approximately)

Site history
- Built: c. 1590

Togher Castle (Irish: Caisleán an Tóchair), is a late 16th century tower house primarily known for its association with the MacCarthys of Gleannacroim. It is located approximately 9 kilometres (5.6 mi) north of the town of Dunmanway in the townland of Togher, which derives from the Irish "tóchar" meaning "causeway", or "causeway of wood over a bog".

== Description ==
Purportedly built on the site of an older structure, Togher Castle sits on a low rocky ridge, about 100 metres north of the River Bandon. While the tower house has had slight modifications over time, the overall fabric remains true to the original design when it was first erected. Principally serving a defensive function, many of its features considered the comfort of the residents associated with the era of fortified houses. Today, there is no remains of a bawn, or any other form of enclosure.

Rectangular in plan, the breath of the east and west walls measure approximately 10 metres (32 ½ ft), and the length of the north and south walls approximately 16.4 metres (54 ft). The overall height is estimated to be about 18 metres (57 ft).

The exterior walls were originally pointed smooth with mortar, with the windows being finely dressed with Cork limestone. The base-batter slopes from the ground level to the first floor. The parapet wall is now mostly ruined, except the western side which survives to its full height. Two great machicolations or bartizans project from the south-east, and north-west corners respectively, with the latter well-preserved.

Togher is an unvaulted tower house, with no surviving ceiling over any of the four floors, except the remnants of 19th century corrugated iron sheets acting as a roof. The whole interior structure is divided into two unequal sections by an offset partition wall to the east side, running between the north and south main walls, and extending the full height of the tower. This allows for the division of the floors into two sets of chambers with the western sections being the larger. The central chimney stack, a continuation of the internal partition wall, contains live flues, while the chimneys on the east and west gables are a decorative feature.

The original ground floor entrance is located to the east, with a window in the western wall since enlarged into an additional doorway. On the right wall of the entrance hall hangs a late 19th century MacCarthy coat of arms funded by Daniel MacCarthy (Glas) (1807–1884), with the lines: Mac Carṫaiġ an orsa, laṁ laidir a buaḋ, which translates to "Mac Carthy of the forces, victory to the strong hand".

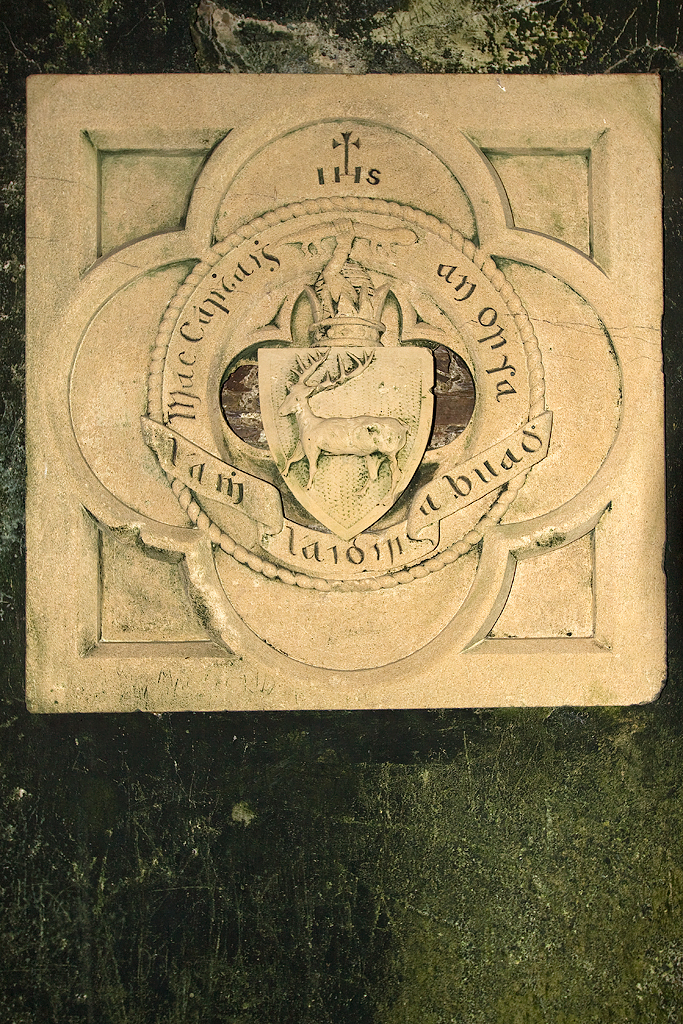
Daniel Mac Carthy (Glas) commissioned the MacCarthy Memorial Shield (1883) from Cork sculptor Patrick J. Scannell which is prominently displayed in the castle's entrance lobby.

The large ground floor major chamber is suggested to have once served primarily as a store room or a wine cellar.

On the north-eastern corner of the tower house, a circular winding staircase leads from the entrance hallway to the top level, from which doors open to each of the major chambers on each floor. A small windowless dungeon is located left of the first stairway, and is recorded by Lyons & Gillman as chambrín á chodaigh ("the tyrant's little chamber").

The first floor chamber may have been used as a low-status hall, functioning as both a wardroom, as well as acting as a kitchen; with the small chamber on the east side serving as a pantry.

Two published surveys of the tower house differ in the role of the second and third floors. Lyons & Gilman (1895, 484) speculate the second floor was the location of the private apartments, due to the minor chamber being named chambrín-na-banaltran ("the little chamber of the nurse"). They then postulate that the State room was the third floor based on its structural layout, with smaller uniformed windows, and an offset positioned fireplace with the remains of a once decorated mantel piece projecting from the wall. However, Samuel (1998, 267) reasons otherwise, with the second floor being the principle chamber of the tower house, due to the location of the great fireplace, and once large decorated windows; as well as in keeping with the supposed role of second floor in other unvaulted tower houses. And thus, he states that the private quarters were situated on the third floor.

Two rooms on the top floor level have been identified as a large attic and a minor storeroom, both of which were once overhung by the original roof.

== History ==
Togher Castle was built by Tadhg an Fhórsa I, otherwise known as "Teig M'Dermod M'Cormoek M'Cartie, alias Teighe O'Norso ["of the Force"], of Downeboy [Dunmanway]". An Fhórsa I was the chief of the MacCarthys of Gleannacroim, the Sliochd Feidhlimidh, who were cousins to the MacCarthy Reaghs of Carbery—itself a branch of the MacCarthy Mór dynasty.

The tower house borders the north-western part of the Gleannacroim territories, which was estimated to be approximately 12,814 acres and in its heyday contained 57½ townlands. Along with Togher, the clan's other strongholds included the now demolished Dunmanway Castle and perhaps an earlier structure once located at Ballinacarriga—though the latter was afterwards a castle of the Hurleys.

It is believed that the construction begun following Tadhg an Fhórsa's acquisition of the Sept lands by royal letters patent from Elizabeth I of England in July 1590, under the system of "surrender and regrant".

The act consolidated Tadhg's hold on the clan after a chain of events in which his elder brother, Cormac Donn assassinated their first cousin and rival claimant, the "official" tanist, and thus chief of the clan Cormac Mac Finghín. For this crime, Cormac Donn was tried and executed in 1576 and the clan territory came under control of the Crown. As all three individuals were grandchildren of a former chief of the clan, Tadhg's right of succession was acknowledged by the Sept in 1578. However, some 12 years later with the coming of age of Finghín, the son of the murdered chieftain, Cormac Mac Finghín the question of true inheritance and position emerged. Tadhg an Fhórsa I was thus motivated to travel to London in 1590 with Sir Walter Raleigh to surrender the said lands of Gleannacroim, despite their past forfeiture, to be re-granted to him in full as his personal estate under English tenure.

On Tadhg's death in 1618, Togher Castle passed to his younger son Dermod, with Dunmanway Castle going to his elder son and successor, Tadhg-an-Duna I ("of the fortress").

As a result of the family's involvement in the Irish Rebellion of 1641 the estate was forfeited in 1651. The tower house and a surrounding estate of 1,419 acres (574 hectares) passed to Hoare brothers of Iretons army in 1667 from the original grantee Lord Kingston.

In the late 19th century, the structure was re-roofed with financial assistance contributed by Daniel Mac Carthy (Glas). During this period, Fr Lyons devised a plan to utilise the building for local industry, but nothing came of this venture. The castle was also recorded as the location of a small school.

== Gallery ==
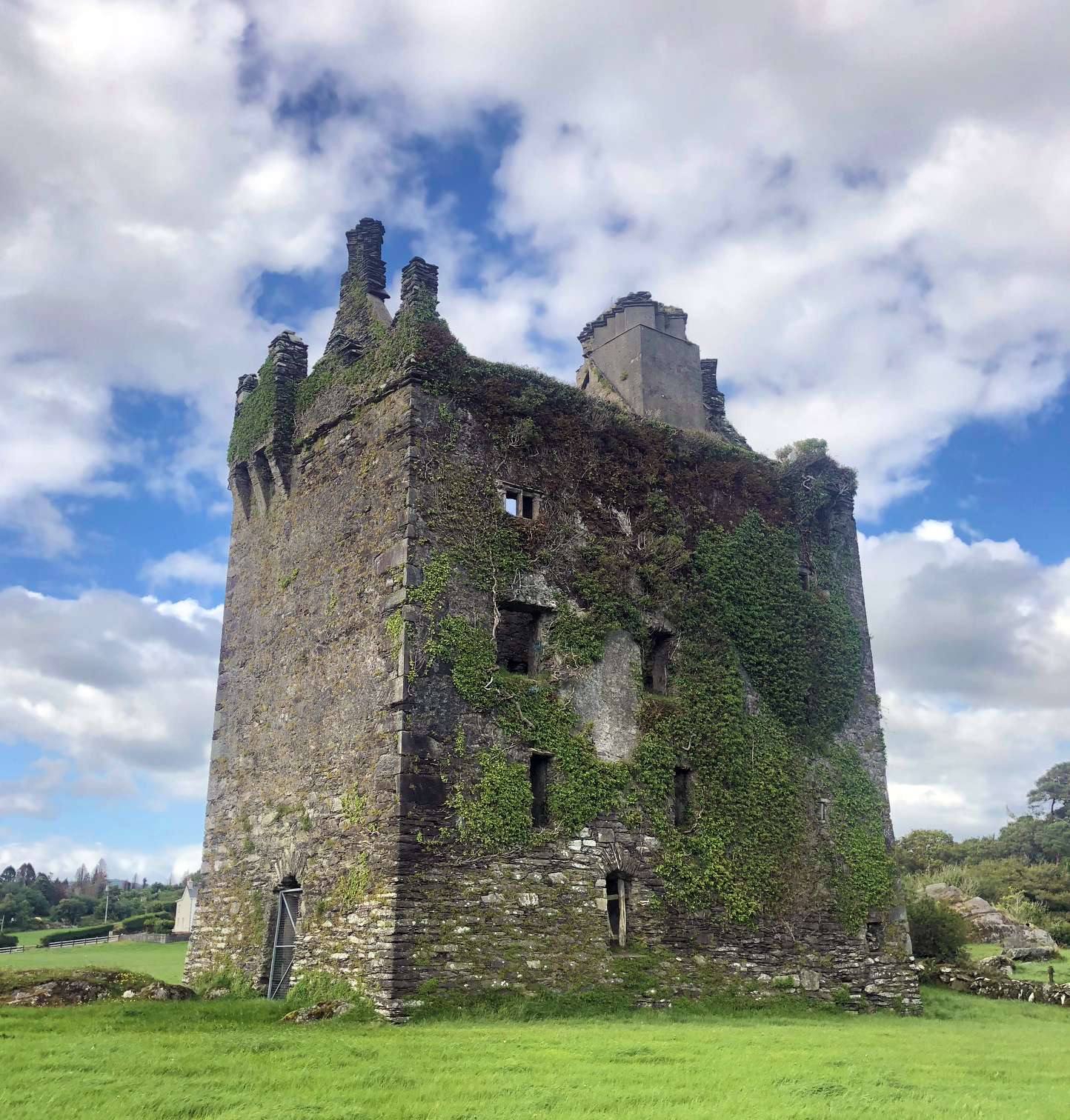
South and Southwestern Facade

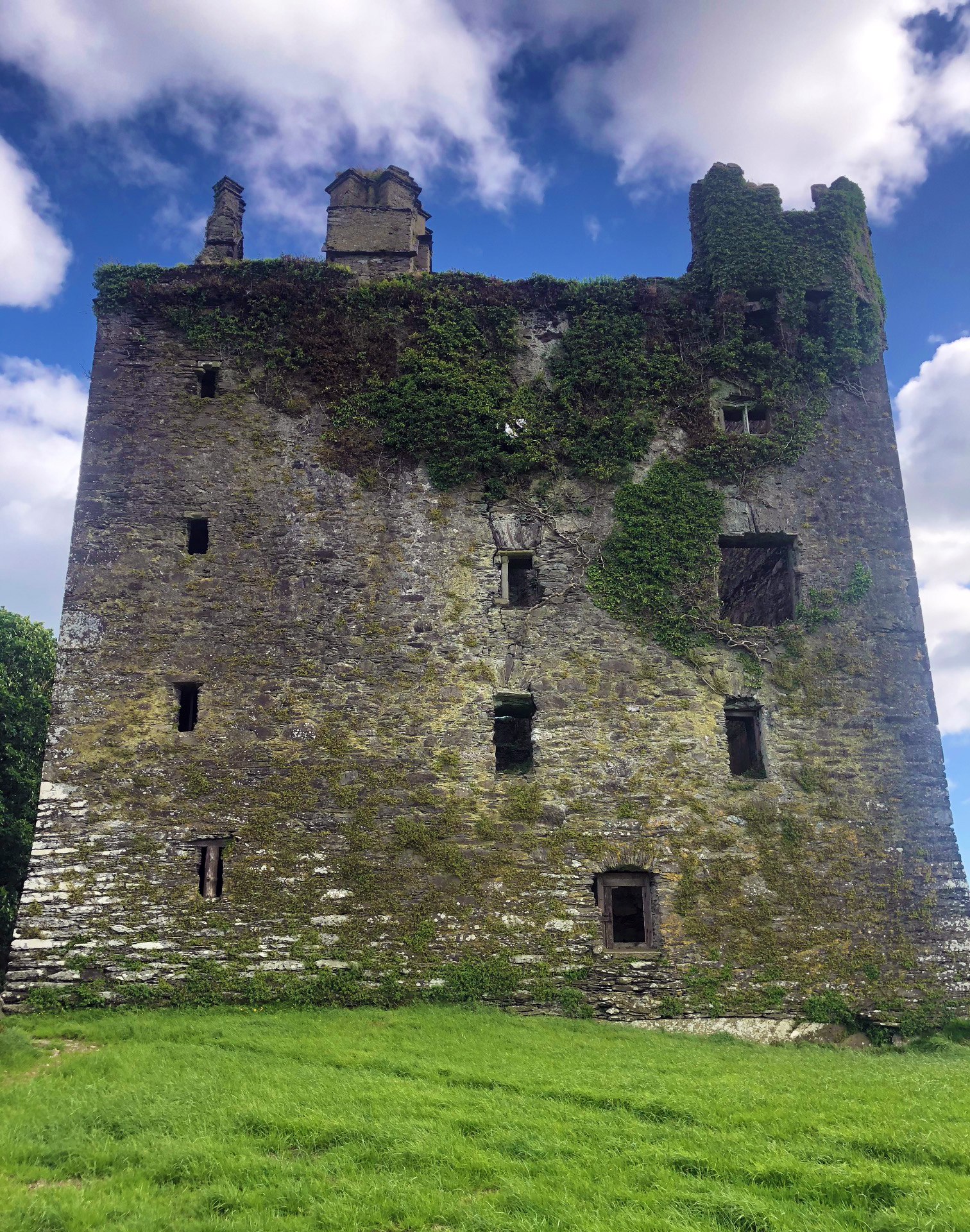
Northern Facade

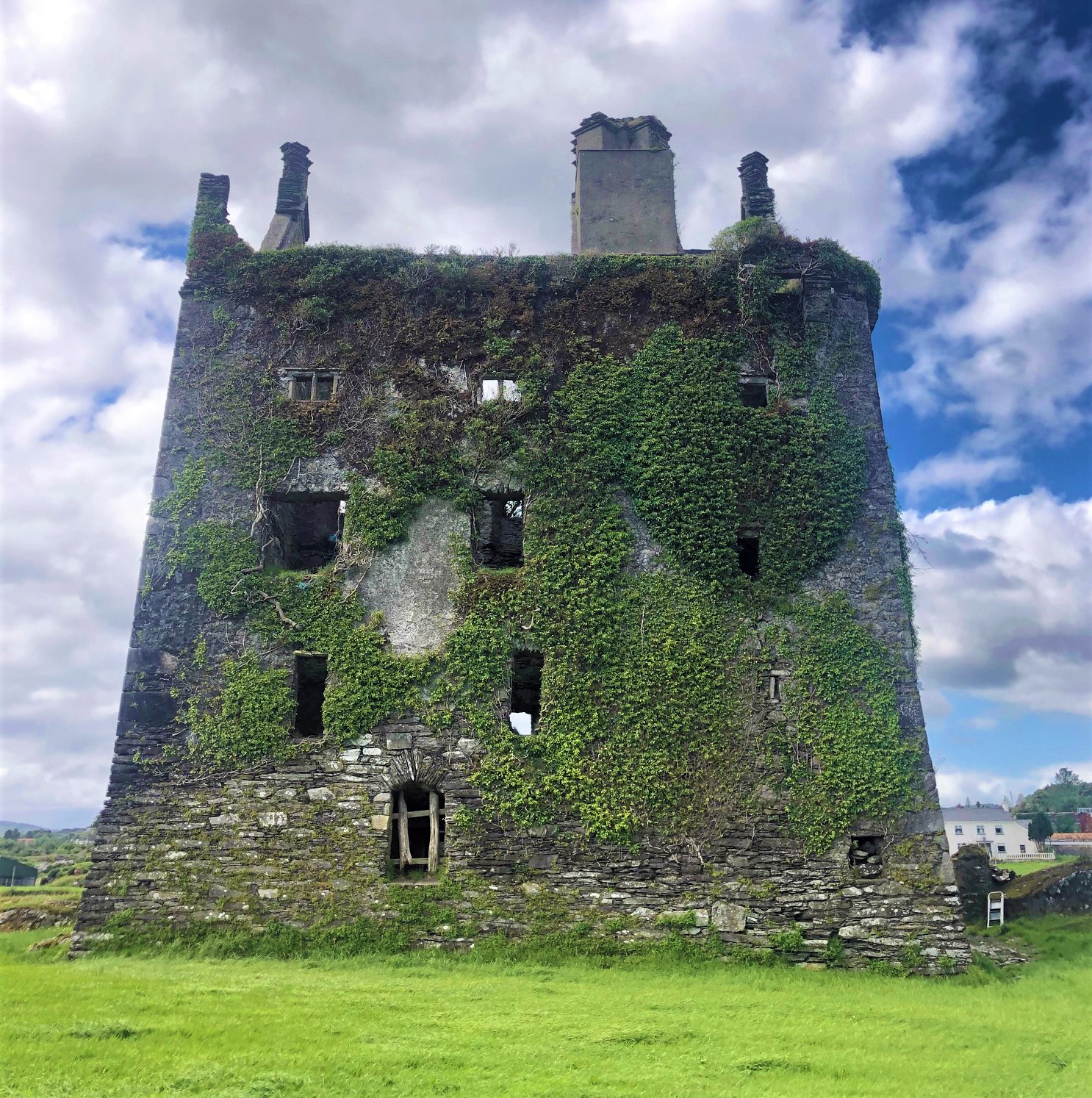
Southern Facade

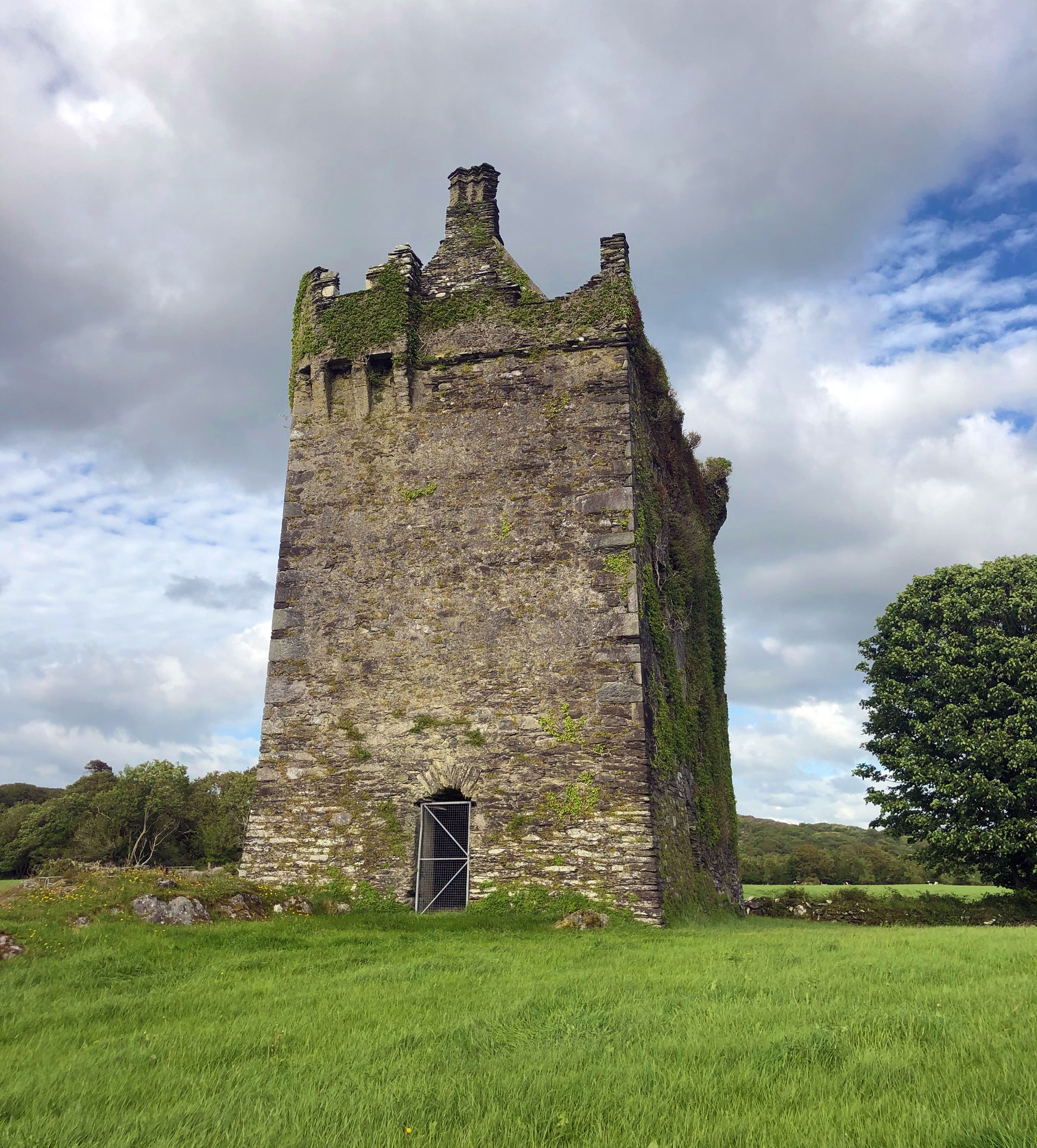
Western Facade

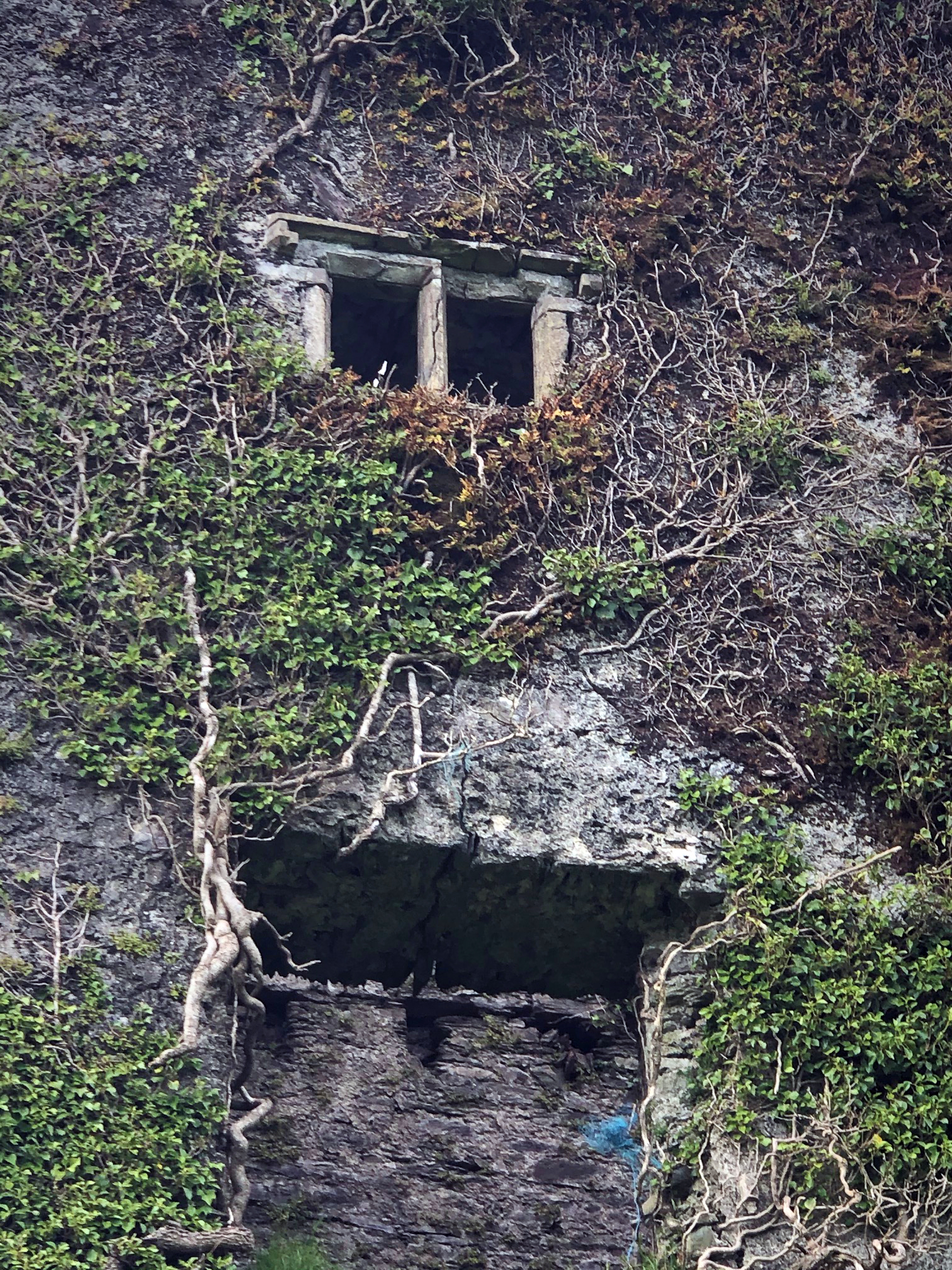
Southside Window

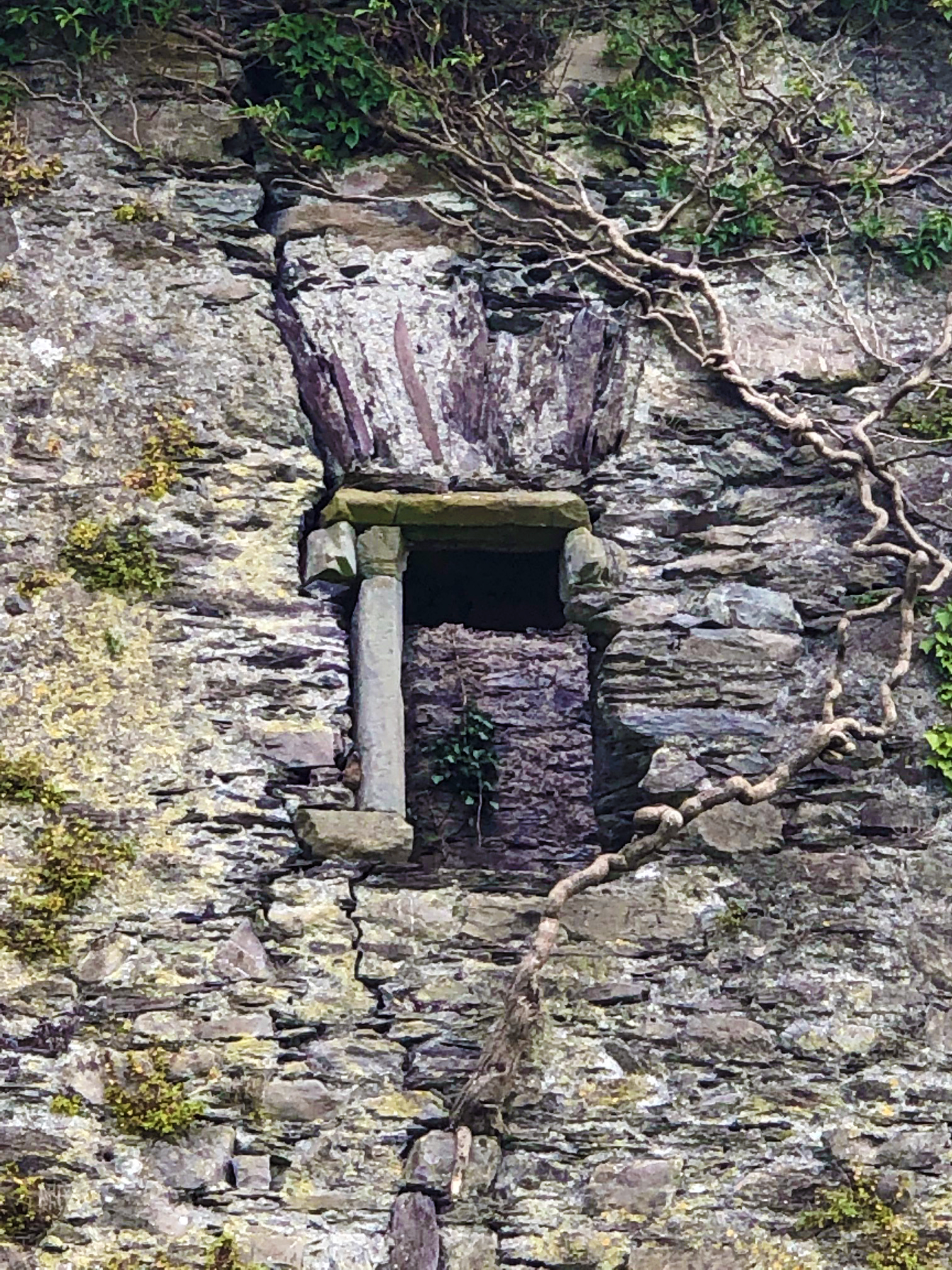
North-side Window

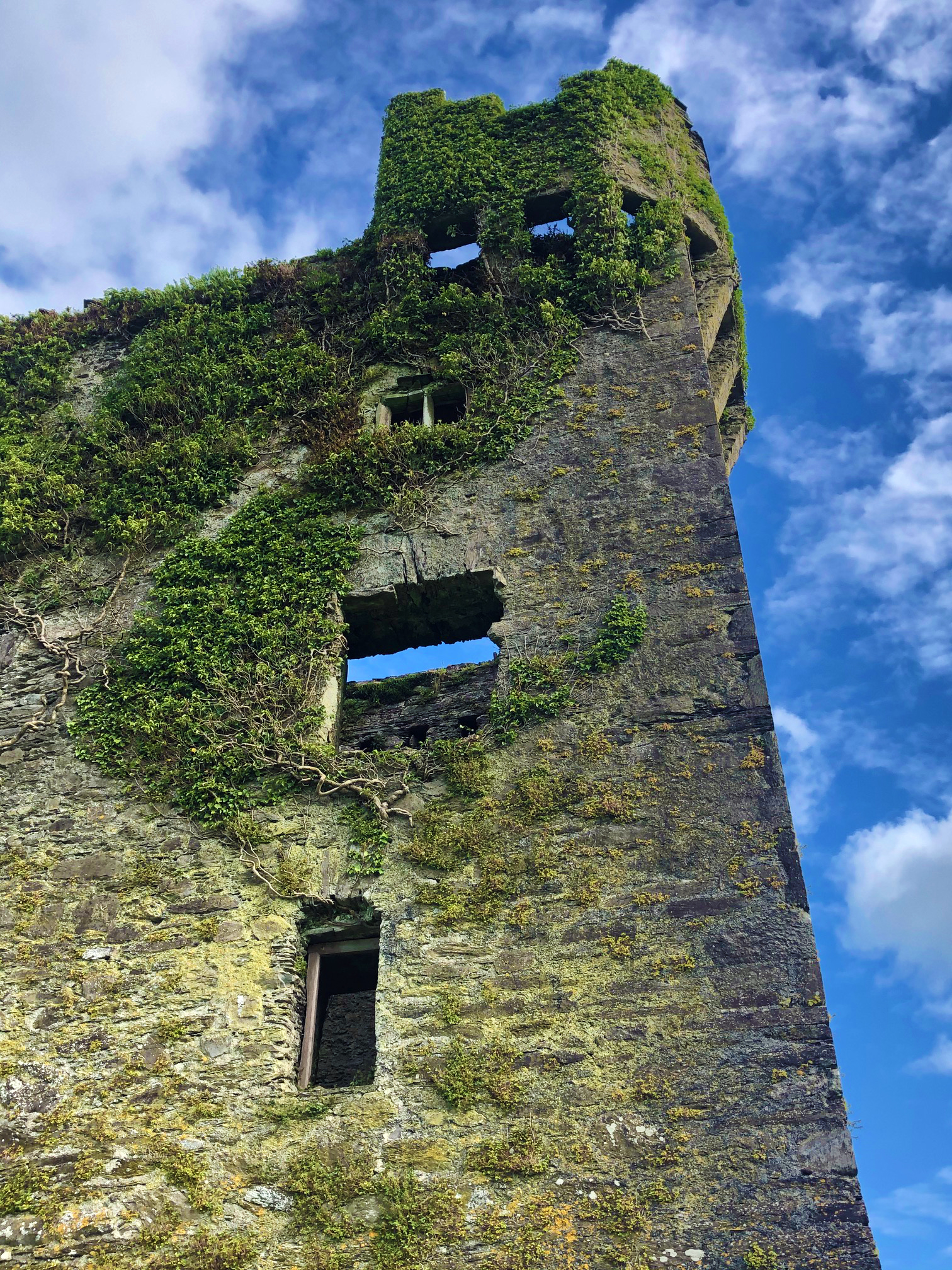
Northwestern Machicolation
