= Dunmanway Castle =

15th-century tower house in Ireland

- County Cork, Ireland
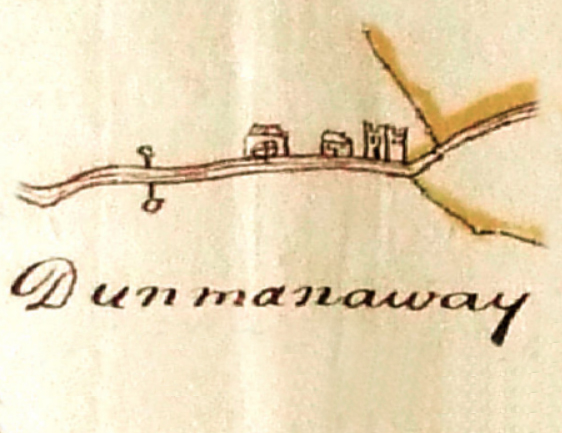
- A schematic representation of Dunmanway Castle from a Down Survey map of the Parish "Funlobbish and Kilmichil" c. 1655–1658

Site information
- Type: Fortified tower house
- Controlled by: The MacCarthys of Gleannacroim; The Arnopp family The Cox family
- Condition: Demolished

Location
- Coordinates: 51.719794°N 9.118257°W

Site history
- Built: c. 1480s
- Built by: Katherine Fitzgerald, Lady of Hy-Carbery

Dunmanway Castle (Irish: Dún Mánmhaí) was a late 15th century tower house that once stood on the north bank of the Sally (Saileach) River in the town of Dunmanway. It was the chief residence of the MacCarthys of Gleannacroim, before being forfeited in the late-17th century and granted to Cromwellian Lt-Colonel William Arnopp. Some speculation exists around the demolition of the building after it was sold to the Cox family in 1692, with some sources suggesting the stone was used for the erection of a nearby flour-mill.

== History ==
The Annals of the Four Masters record that the tower house of "Dun-na-m-beann" was built by Catherine Fitzgerald, daughter of the 7th Earl of Desmond and wife of Finghin MacCarthy Reagh: "Catherine, daughter of the Earl of Desmond... It was by her that Beann-dubh and Dun-na-m-beann were erected." It is claimed to be the first tower house built in this part of Carbery.

From the mid-13th century, the surrounding district of Dunmanway was a stronghold of the MacCarthys of Gleannacroim, who were cousins to the MacCarthy Reaghs of Carbery—itself a branch of the MacCarthy Mór dynasty. No evidence appears to exist as to when this clan took possession of the tower house. However, it may have passed from the Reaghs to the MacCarthys of Gleannacroim after Catherine's death in 1506 with the view to reinforce the clan's hold within the area.

In 1584, the Fiant of Eliz., No. 4416 authorised a pardon to clan chieftain Tadhg-an-Fhorsa I referenced as "Teig M'Dermod M'Cormoek M'Cartie, alias Teighe O'Norso, of Downeboy [Dunmanway], gent," for his involvement in the Desmond Rebellions, and thus the retention of holdings of land and goods. While no mention is given to the clan possessions or the castle at Dunmanway, a subsequent Fiant of Eliz., No. 5520, 1590 outlines a detailed reference to both, when Tadhg-an-Fhorsa I surrendered the Sept lands to Queen Elizabeth I to be then regranted the entire territory as his personal estate under the system of "surrender and regrant":

Grant to Thady M'Dermot Carthie of Donemayneway... the castle and lands of Donemayneway, county Cork, one quarter of land called the quarter of Kilwarrye, and one quarter of land respectively in each of the following: Dromlynie, Inchie, Drowmdrastell, Quynrahe...[etc.]. To hold in tail male, by service of twentieth part of a knight's fee. Maintaining ten footmen when required for the queen's service.

The tower house was purportedly seized by the 4th Earl of Thomond in 1602, under the direction of the Lord President of Munster, George Carew, as a consequence of Tadhg-an-Fhorsa's participation in the Nine Years' War in Munster:

...if Teg Onorsie's castles and Randel Duffes' (O'Hurley) shall in your opinion be meet for the service, doe you take them into your hands, and leave wards in them; but let not your intent bee discovered until you be possessed of them.

In June 1615, Tadhg-an-Fhorsa I went a second time through the process of surrender and regrant of his estate to James I, and duly declared by will his disposal of them. On his death in 1618, Togher Castle passed to his younger son Dermod, with Dunmanway Castle going to his elder son and successor, Tadhg-an-Duna I ("of the fortress").

Otherwise called Tadhg-na-Feile, due to his great hospitality whilst living in Dunmanway Castle, the poet Domhnall na-Tuile praised his patron, "for the bestowal of wines and tender beef, and holiday dresses, and the love of humanity, Ireland possessed no chieftain equal to Tadgh-na-Feile".

The involvement of Tadhg-an-Duna I in the Irish Rebellion of 1641, which he served as second in command of the Munster clan forces under Cormac MacCarthy Reagh lead to the sequestration of a large portion of his estate during the Cromwellian confiscations.

The terrier from the 1655–58 Down Survey map for the parish of "Funlobbish and Kilmichil" lists within the estate of "Teig Carthy als Downe" for the year 1641, "one castle and mill on Dunmanaway" with 1,460 arable and pastoral acres. In 1652, Tadhg's widow Honor O'Donovan and his youngest son, Callahan/Ceallaghan are recorded as living in Dunmanway Castle. However, it was with the distribution of the forfeited MacCarthy lands during the reign of Charles II that Cromwellian officer "Lt-Collonell William Arnop, 26 June 1666, passed patent for 3 plowlands of Dunmanway, and 2 gneeves of Togher, containing, 1,460 acres profitable, and 594 acres unprofitable". In 1670, William Arnopp is returned by the Books of Survey and Distribution as owner of the townland of Dunmanway, an area which included Dunmanway Castle. On 16 August 1692, Peirce Arnopp, son of Lt-Collonell William Arnopp sold his share of his father's estate of 2,932 acres around Dunmanway to Sir Richard Cox. During this period, Cox acquired further possessions and became the principle landholder in the district. He also expended much effort in the establishment of the town of Dunmanway.

Conflicting lore surrounds the demolition of the tower house. Some credit the same Sir Richard Cox with its destruction as a means to source material to build both his mansion and the "Market House", as well as the "Long Bridge" which spans the River Bandon to the east of the town. According to Rev Lyons and Gillman, the castle walls did not disappear until about 1830. George Bennett records in his 1869 publication History of Bandon:

There is not even one stone left upon another of this famous old fortalice... as its walls, and its very foundations, were uprooted some years ago, to furnish building-stone for the erection of a flour-mill in the vicinity.

Bennett also noted:

While the workman were engaged in this work of demolition, and blotting out every trace of this – the first stone castle that was ever erected in this part of Carbery-they came upon a subterraneous chamber. Carefully removing the superincumbent earth and rubbish, they descended into the granary. It was from this reservoir the Geraldines, and their successors, the McCarthys, drew supplies for the kern and the gallow-glasses; at the head of whom they often struck terror into the heart of some neighbouring chieftains, or engaged in the hopless enterprize of endeavouring to drive out the stranger who had settled amongst them, and who called their country his own. The granary contained several compartments, and these were nearly all filled with native wheat. The compartments themselves were in perfect order, but the wheat, which time and circumstances had shrunk and discoloured, was found to be as hard as shot, and quite as black.

== Etymology ==
Known settlements in the area before the arrival of the MacCarthys may have been the basis of the naming of the territory, with O'Mahony suggesting it being the location of "Duncoba", one of the three residences of the King of the Ui Eachach. However, he speculates the naming of the area may have evolved with the building of the late 15th-century tower house, influencing both the name of the townland in which it stood and subsequently the town which evolved around it.

While there is some difference of opinion to the exact meaning of the Irish word "Dúnmaonmhuighe"/"Dúnmaonmhuí", some interpret the translation of the compound word as a combination of both topographic elements and a man-made structure incorporated into its name with "the castle of the yellow river" (Dun-own-bwee), or "fort of the middle plain" (Dun Meadhon Mhuige). However, according to Irish language scholar John O'Donovan, the name signifies a description of the structure only, thus being "the fort of the gables or pinnacles" (Dun-na-mbeann).

Another derivation is outlined in the History of Bandon with it translating as "the fort of the yellow women", "the yellow women being the term applied by the Irish to the Spanish soldiers who garrisoned the fort, in contempt of the colour of their skin, and the cloaks which they wore". This may have been further inspired by the story that "Spanish coins (temp. Ferdinand and Isabella) were dug up where Dunmanway Castle stood."
