= Alice Taylor (writer) =

Irish writer (born 1938)

- Born: 28 February 1938 (age 88); Lisdangan, Newmarket, Ireland
- Occupation: Writer
- Spouse: Gabriel Murphy (m. 1926; died 2005)
- Children: 5

Alice Taylor (born 28 February 1938) is an Irish writer and novelist particularly known for her nostalgia works looking back at life in a small village.

== Life and career ==
Born 28 February 1938 on a farm in Lisdangan, Newmarket in North Cork. She was educated at Drishane Convent. Taylor worked in Bandon before marrying Gabriel Murphy. Her husband died in 2005. They have four sons and one daughter. When she married she moved to Innishannon in 1961. There she ran a guesthouse, the local post office and a shop.

In 1984 she edited and published a local magazine, Candlelight, and in 1986 she published an illustrated collection of her poetry. However it was her book To School Through the Fields, published in May 1988, which brought her fame. She had numerous interviews on national shows including RTÉ Radio's The Gay Byrne Show and The Late Late Show. The next books were equally successful and have been sold internationally. Since then she has moved onto novels which have also become best sellers.

Taylor has remained very connected to the village where she lives. One of the programs she has been involved in was the restoration of the old Innishannon Tower.

== Bibliography ==
=== Memoir ===
- To School Through the Fields (Dingle: Brandon 1988; NY: St Martins Press 1990; London: Century Publ. 1991), 275pp.;
- An Irish Country Diary (Dingle: Brandon 1988);
- Quench the Lamp (Dingle: Brandon 1990), 196pp. and Do. (NY: St Martins Press 1991) [into ISIS large print 1992];
- The Village (Dingle: Brandon 1992, 1996);
- The Woman of the House (Dingle: Mount Eagle 1997);
- Going to the Well (Dingle: Mount Eagle 1998), 89pp.;
- Across the River (Dingle: Mount Eagle 2000), 283pp.;
- A Fallen Leaf: A Journey Through Bereavement (Dingle: Brandon Press 2004), 160pp.;
- House of Memories (Dingle: Brandon Press 2005, 2006), 288pp.;
- The Parish (Dingle: Brandon Press 2008), 221pp.
- The Nana (O'Brien Press 2020)

=== Poetry ===
- Close to the Earth (Dingle: Brandon Press 1989) [port. on cover];
- The Journey: New and Selected Poems (Dingle: Brandon Press 2009), 206pp.

=== Miscellaneous ===
- Secrets of the Oak (Brandon ?1992), fairytale for children;
- Night Before Christmas (Brandon 1994);
- A Country Miscellany (Mount Eagle 1999), 123pp. [essays];
- Introduction to Stephen Rynne, Green Fields: A Journal of Irish Country Life [1938] (Dingle: Brandon 1995);
- A Child’s Book of Irish Rhymes (Bath: Barefoot 1996), 48pp. [ill. by Nicola Emoe].
