= Kilmacsimon =

Village in County Cork, Ireland

Kilmacsimon Coill Mhic Shíomoin
- Village
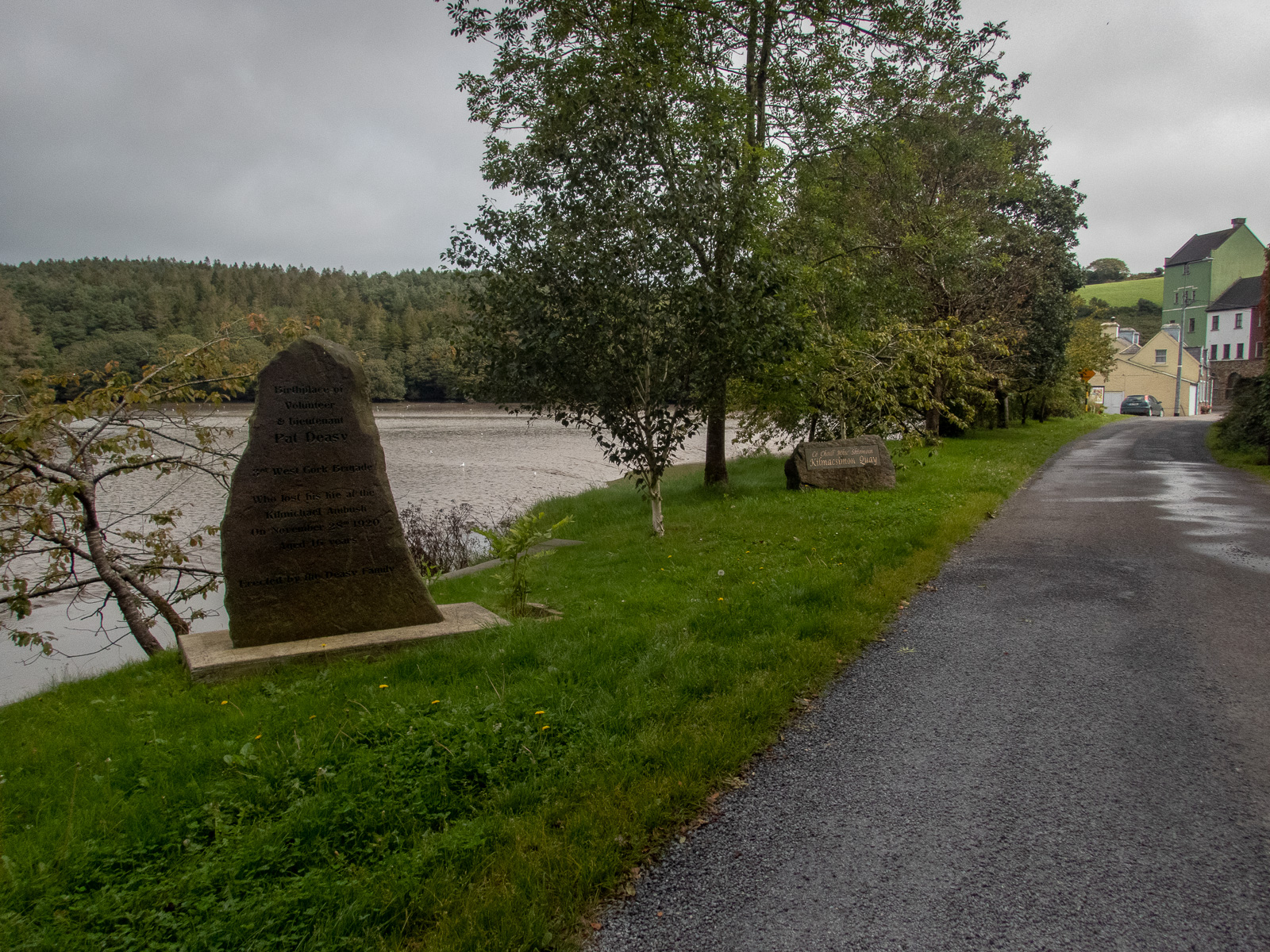
- Memorial close to Kilmacsimon Quay on the River Bandon

- Location in Ireland
- Coordinates: 51°43′58″N 08°38′04″W
- Country: Ireland
- Province: Munster
- County: County Cork
- Time zone: UTC+0 (WET)
  - Summer (DST): UTC-1 (IST (WEST))

Kilmacsimon (Irish: Coill Mhic Shíomoin, meaning 'Mac Simon's Wood') is a small village and townland situated on the banks of the River Bandon in County Cork, Ireland. Historical records list Killmcsimon in the Calendar of Patent Rolls of James I dated 1615.

The village has a pub and a community and activity centre which opened in May 2014. The local rowing club hosts the Kilmacsimon Water Carnival every year towards the end of June.

The more substantial village of Innishannon is 4 km to the north. The town of Bandon is 7 km to the west, and Cork city is 22 km to the north-east.
