= Knockavilla, County Cork =

Village in County Cork, Ireland

Knockavilla Cnoc an Bhile
- Village
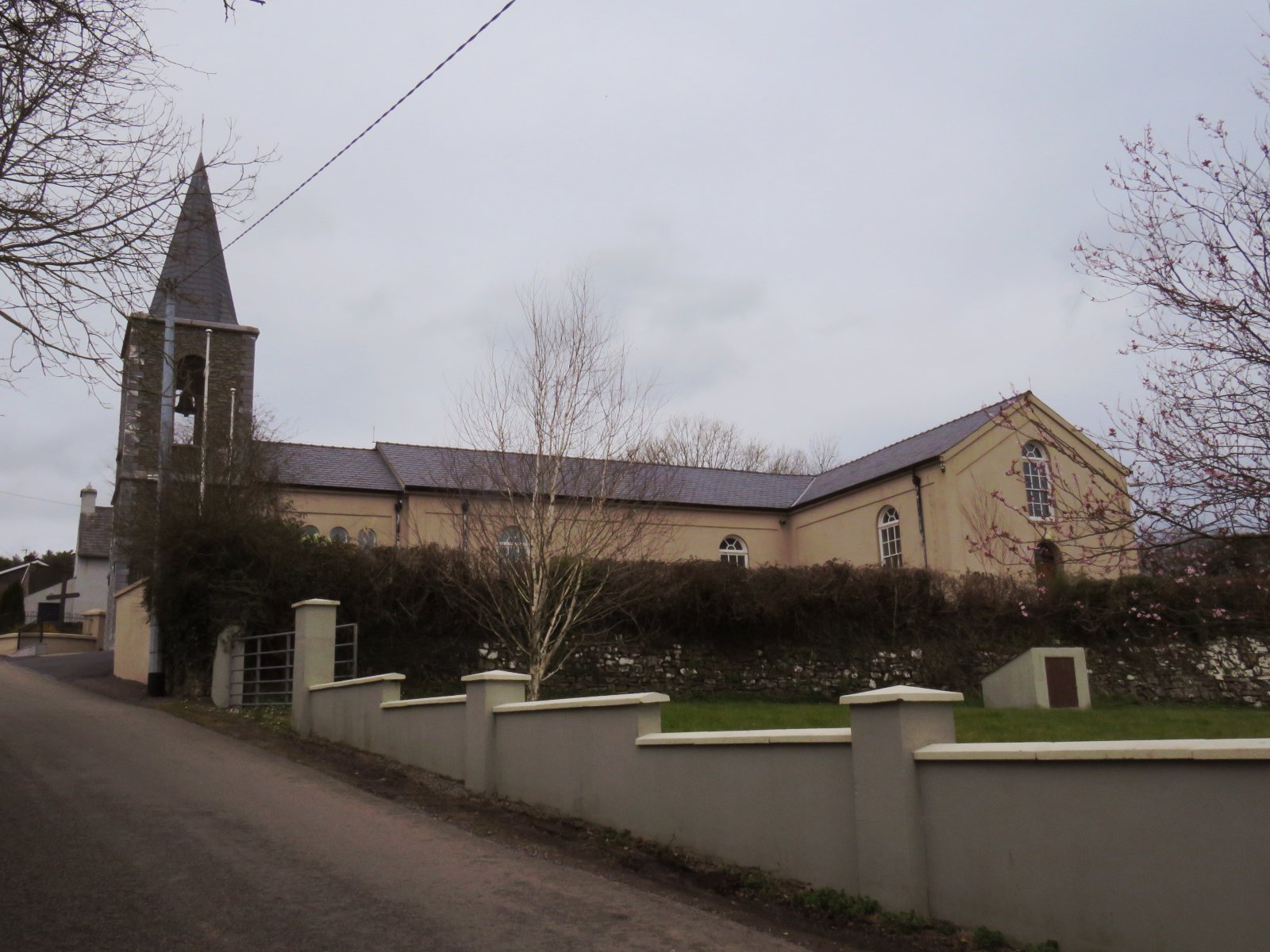
- St Patricks Church

- Location in Ireland
- Coordinates: 51°48′3.92″N 8°41′3.66″W
- Country: Ireland
- Province: Munster
- County: County Cork
- Time zone: UTC+0 (WET)
  - Summer (DST): UTC-1 (IST (WEST))

Knockavilla (Irish: Cnoc an Bhile) is a small village in County Cork, Ireland, a few of kilometres from Crossbarry and Innishannon. The local Roman Catholic church is dedicated to Saint Patrick. There is also a school, a pub, a graveyard, and a community hall (situated next to St. Patrick's church). Knockavilla Celtic is the local association football club.

== Location ==
The village of Knockavilla is located in the electoral division of Knockavilla (sometimes spelled Knockavilly), and a civil parish of the same name.

Knockavilla lies on a hill in the northern part of the Roman Catholic parish of Innishannon-Knockavilla, to the north and west of the neighbouring villages of Innishannon and Crossbarry.

A large hillfort, Knockavilla or Clashanimud hillfort, overlooks the area. This structure dates to c. 1200 BC, and is the oldest known prehistoric hillfort in the country.

== Amenities ==
The Roman Catholic church in Knockavilla, Saint Patrick's Church, dates from 1790. It was renovated in 2007 and 2008.

Knockavilla is served by a national (primary) school. Knockavilla National School, also known as Scoil Mhaoilíosa, was built in 1973 and had approximately 150 pupils enrolled as of the 2020 school year. The school was previously housed in what is now the parish hall.

== See also ==
- List of towns and villages in Ireland
