= Gurrane =

Townland in County Cork, Ireland

Coordinates: 51.8323°N 8.6566°W

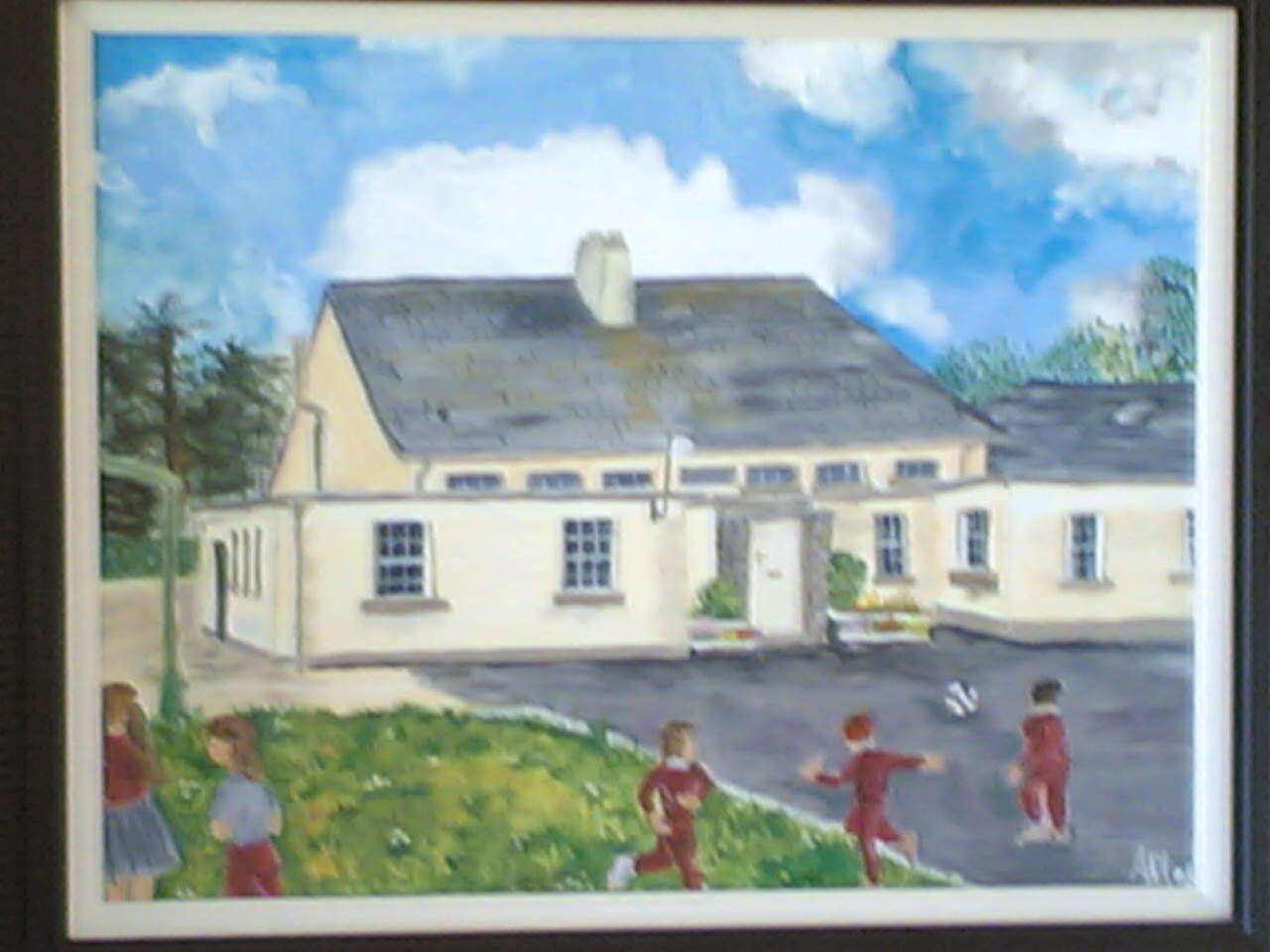
Gurrane National School, Crossbarry, Innishannon, County Cork

Garranewaterig (Irish: Garrán an Bháitéaraigh), sometimes known as Gurranes or Gurrane, is a townland in the civil parish of Knockavilly in County Cork, Ireland. It lies to the north of Innishannon and Crossbarry, and is close to the main road to Killumney, Ovens, and Ballincollig.

A tributary of the Owenaboy river flows through Gurrane on its way to join the river at Crossbarry.

The area has one primary school - Gurrane National School. A former principal of the school, Richard Barrett, was executed in 1922 in revenge for the killing of Sean Hales. They had been childhood friends.

== Name ==
The name of the townland is derived from the Irish language word garrán, meaning "grove". There are several other townlands (in County Cork and elsewhere in Ireland) which have a similar derivation.
