= Sam Maguire =

Irish Gaelic footballer

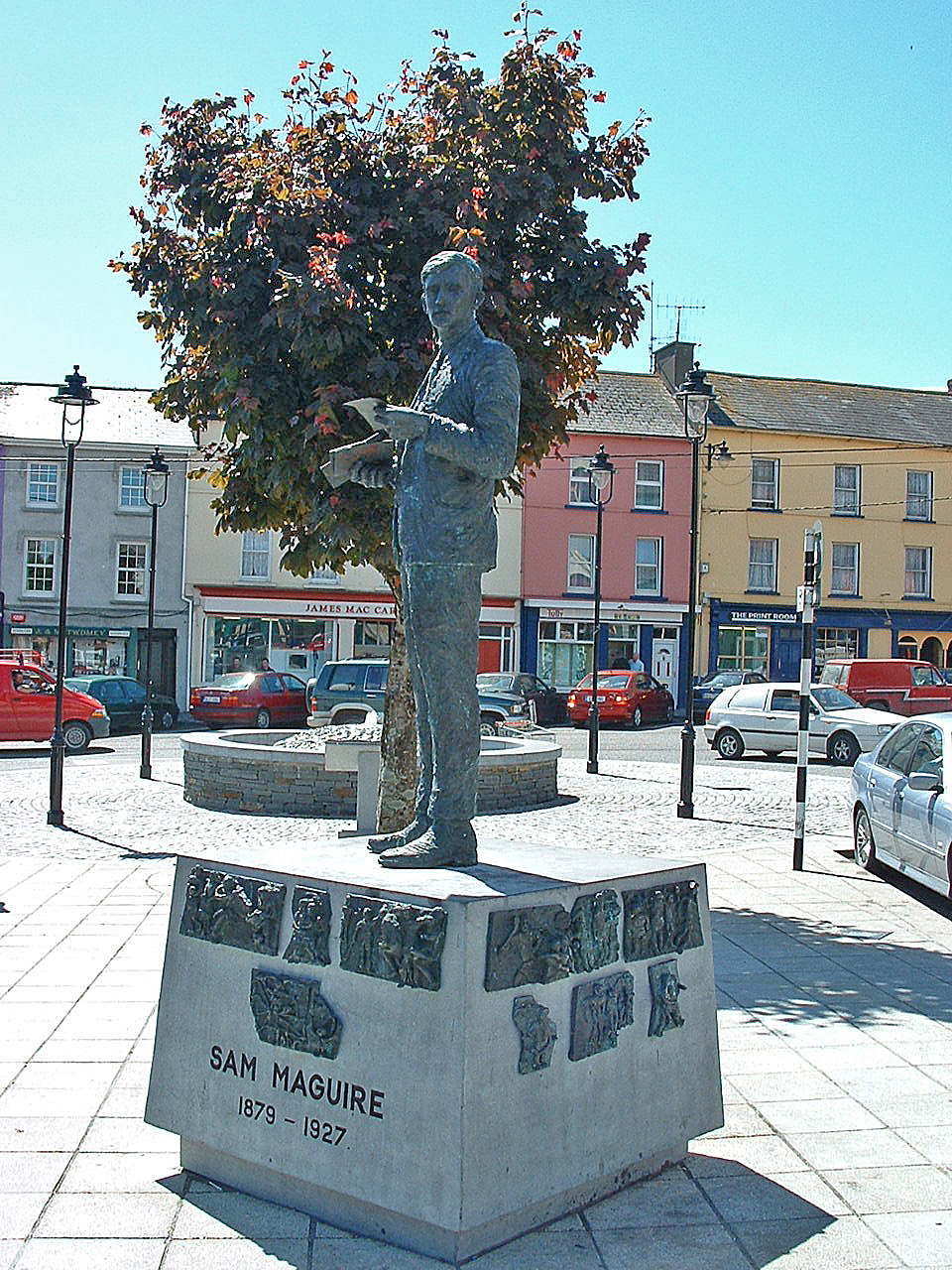
- Statue in Dunmanway

Personal information
- Native name: Somhairle Mag Uidhir (Irish)
- Born: 11 March 1877 Dunmanway, County Cork, Ireland
- Died: 6 February 1927 (aged 49)

Sport
- Sport: Gaelic football
- Position: –
Inter-county
- Years: County
- ?-?: London; Cork

Samuel Maguire (also Irish: Sam Mhic Uidhir, 11 March 1877 – 6 February 1927) was an Irish republican and Gaelic football player. He is chiefly remembered as the eponym of the Sam Maguire Cup, given to the All-Ireland Senior Champions of Gaelic football each year.

== Early life ==
He was born in the townland of Mallabraca near the town of Dunmanway in West Cork on 1877 and was a member of the Church of Ireland. He was the son of farmer John Maguire and Jane Kingston.

He had four brothers and two sisters. Willie was the eldest then Mary, Jack, Dick, Paul (who married a Roman Catholic and whose son became a Roman Catholic priest), Sam and Elizabeth. The Maguires farmed 200 acres (0.81 km^{2}) of land. However this figure is misleading as only approximately 80 acres were arable land. The translation of the townland Mallabraca is "land of the little hillocks".

He went to school in the Model School in the local town Dunmanway and then to the national school in Ardfield. This school run by Master Madden specialised in preparing its pupils for the UK Civil Service and Post Office examinations. Madden was part of a long tradition of Irish nationalism and he had a field next to the school where pupils could play Gaelic football.

The school was very successful and became known as the "University of the Mountains" because the place name Ardfield can be literally translated as the "place on the high ground". At the age of 20, Maguire passed the exams for the UK Post Office.

== Professional life ==
He then took a job in the British Civil Service in London. A member of the London Hibernians GAA club, Maguire captained London in the 1901 and 1904 All-Ireland finals.

In 1907 he went into the administration of the London GAA, becoming the Chairman of the London County Board and a regular delegate to the Annual Congress of the GAA. He later became a trustee of Croke Park. Coincidentally, Vice-Chairman of the London County Board was Liam MacCarthy who gave his name to the All-Ireland Senior Hurling Championship trophy, the Liam MacCarthy Cup.

He is also remembered in the political sphere for recruiting the nationalist leader Michael Collins to the Irish Republican Brotherhood in 1909 and for many years was one of Collins's right hand men. Maguire, Sean McGrath and Art O'Brien were at the center of gun running operations out of London. As Collins's chief intelligence officer in London, Maguire became the centre of Scotland Yard's investigation into the assassination of Sir Henry Wilson. Maguire was tipped off and fled to Dublin in December 1923 where he got a job in the newly established Irish civil service. Because of his political opinions and his sympathies to the Anti-Treaty forces, he quickly clashed with his superiors and was dismissed.

== Death ==
Cork-based Margaret Walsh, who has written Sam Maguire: The Enigmatic Man Behind Ireland's Most Prestigious Trophy, says that "what became of him was very sad". "In 1924, he was sacked and deprived of his pension." They (the Irish Government) gave him £100 and that was it. "In 1925, he came back to west Cork to live. He then developed TB and died in penury in 1927 aged 49. They say that he died of a broken heart and penniless."

He is buried in the cemetery of Saint Mary's in Dunmanway. A Celtic cross was raised over his grave with a simple inscription

Erected to the memory of Samuel Maguire, Mallabraca who died 6th February 1927 by the people of Dunmanway and his numerous friends throughout Ireland and England in recognition of his love for his country.

Dunmanway's Dohenys GAA club named their home pitch Sam Maguire Park in his honour, and the club's under-age teams joined with the Randal Og Club compete under the moniker "Sam Maguires". On 15 September 2002, a statue of Sam Maguire was unveiled as the centrepiece of a new €500,000 plaza in Dunmanway's town centre.

In 2017, the community of Dunmanway paid for a new set of eight bells (the 'Sam Maguire Community bells') which are installed in St Mary's Church. The two lightest bells were cast in 2017 and have 'Sam Maguire 1877-1927' inscribed on them, while the back six bells were cast in 1887 by John Warner, and were formerly hung in the now-closed Christ Church, Llanelli, Wales.

== Sam Maguire Cup ==
The Sam Maguire Cup was designed and presented to the Gaelic Athletic Association in 1928 in his honour after his death in 1927. The cup cost £300 in 1928 (equivalent to £13,176 in 2021). After it had been commissioned by the committee under the chairmanship of Dr Pat McCartan, the task of making the cup was given to Hopkins and Hopkins, a jewellers and watchmakers, of O'Connell Bridge, Dublin.

The cups design is modelled closely on the Ardagh chalice.

The silver cup was crafted, on behalf of Hopkins and Hopkins, by the silversmith Matthew J. Staunton of D'Olier Street, Dublin.

Kildare was the first winner of the Sam Maguire Cup after defeating Cavan 2–6 to 2–5 in 1928. The cup was replaced in 1988, with Meath the first recipient of "Sam Óg" after a defeat of Cork.
