= Innishannon =

Village in County Cork, Ireland

Innishannon / Inishannon Irish: Inis Eonáin
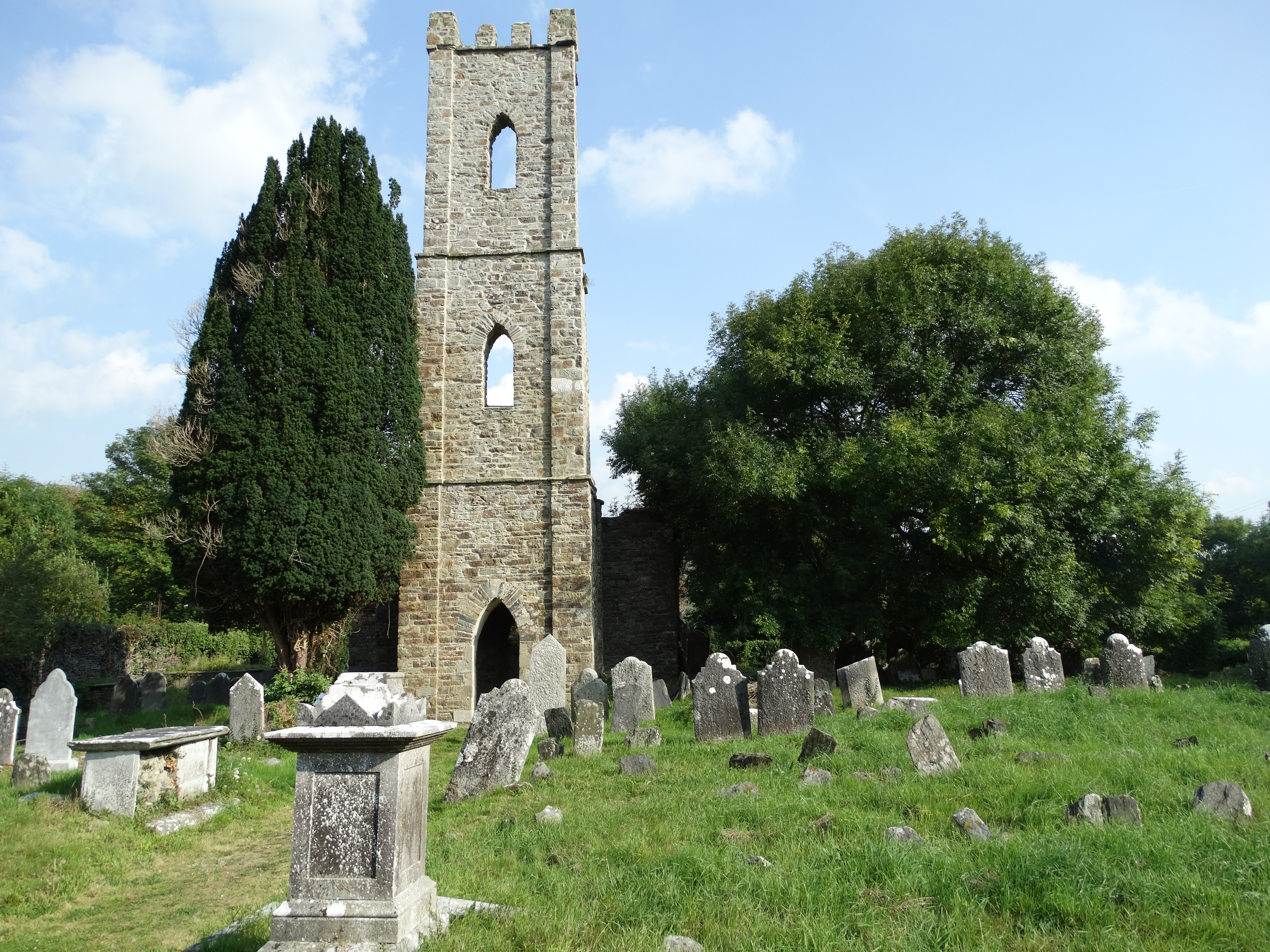
- Innishannon Tower marks the location of a medieval Huguenot chapel

- Location in Ireland
- Coordinates: 51°45′55″N 8°39′25″W
- Country: Ireland
- Province: Munster
- County: Cork
- District: Bandon

Population (2022)
  - Total: 1,043

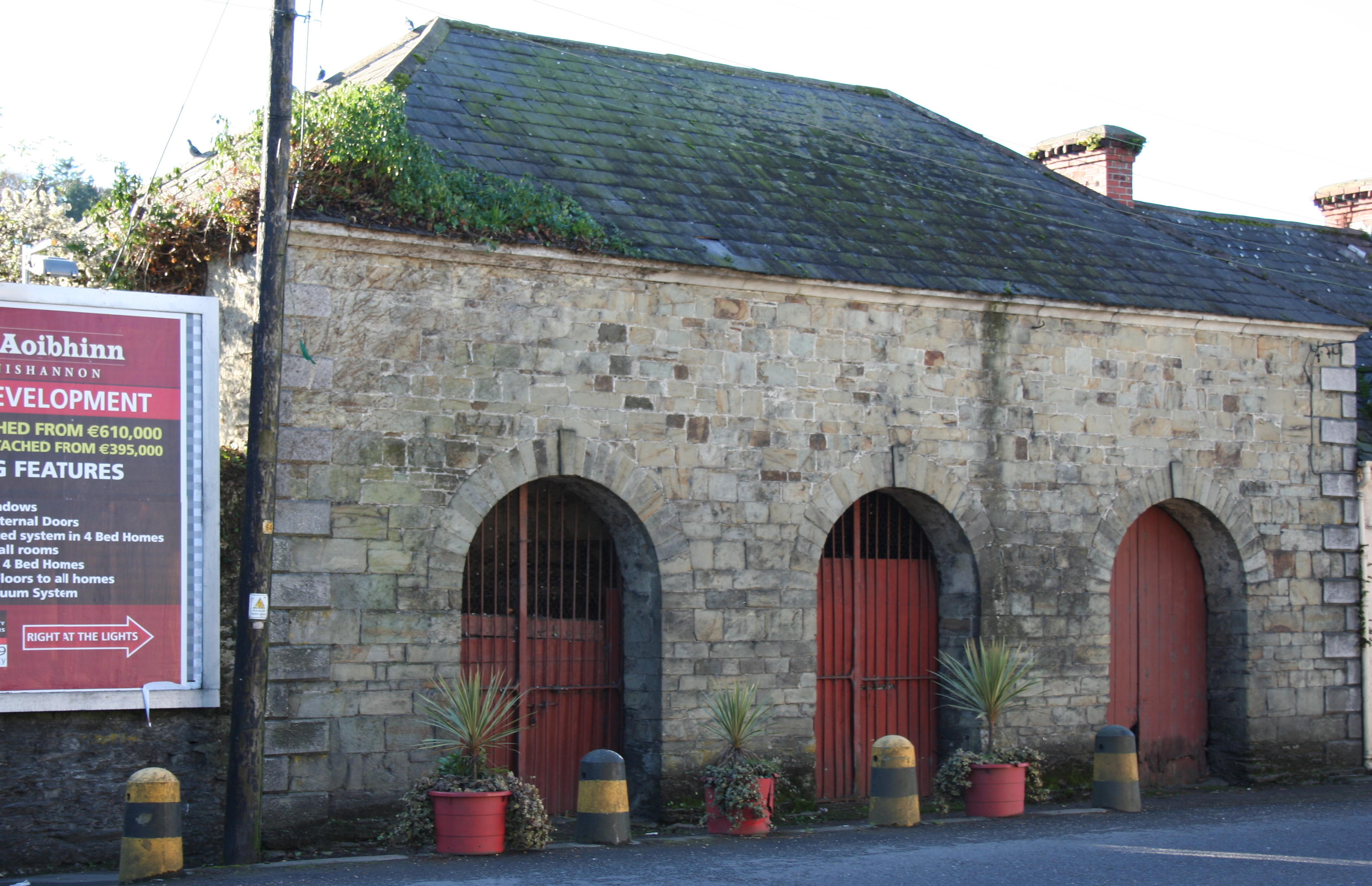
Innishannon Market House built c. 1780

Innishannon or Inishannon (Irish: Inis Eonáin) is a large village on the main Cork–Bandon road (N71) in County Cork, Ireland. Situated on the River Bandon, the village has grown due to its proximity to Cork city (20 km to the north-east), and is now a dormitory town for city workers. As of 2022, it had a population of 1,043.

== History ==
Inishannon village is located at and developed around an important crossing-point on the River Bandon. Formerly controlled by the de Barry family, the area was used as a ferry point on the river from at least the early medieval period. Inishannon received a market and fair grant in 1256, and was given a royal charter in 1412. Writing in the mid-18th century, the antiquarian Charles Smith described Inishannon as "formerly walled and a place of some note". Innishannon Tower, the remains of a mid-18th century church, are built on the site the much earlier medieval parish church of Inishannon.

In 1837, Inishannon village had a population of approximately 650 people. By the 2016 census, Innishannon had a population of 1,043, a near threefold increase in the 25 years since the 1991 census, when the village had 319 inhabitants. As of 2022, it had a population of over 1000 people.

== Events ==
Innishannon Steam and Vintage Rally is held in Innishannon annually in June. This event continues on from the old Upton Steam Rally that was held on the old St. Patricks School grounds. The Innishannon Steam and Vintage Rally was formed in 1998, and attracts upwards of 1,000 exhibits and approximately 60,000 visitors every year. Proceeds from the event are used in fundraising for the Irish Cancer Society.

== Transport ==
The area was previously served by the Cork and Bandon Railway. Upton and Innishannon railway station opened in August 1849 and closed in April 1961.

The village lies on the N71 secondary road between Cork and Bandon. It is on several bus routes.

== Innishannon parish ==
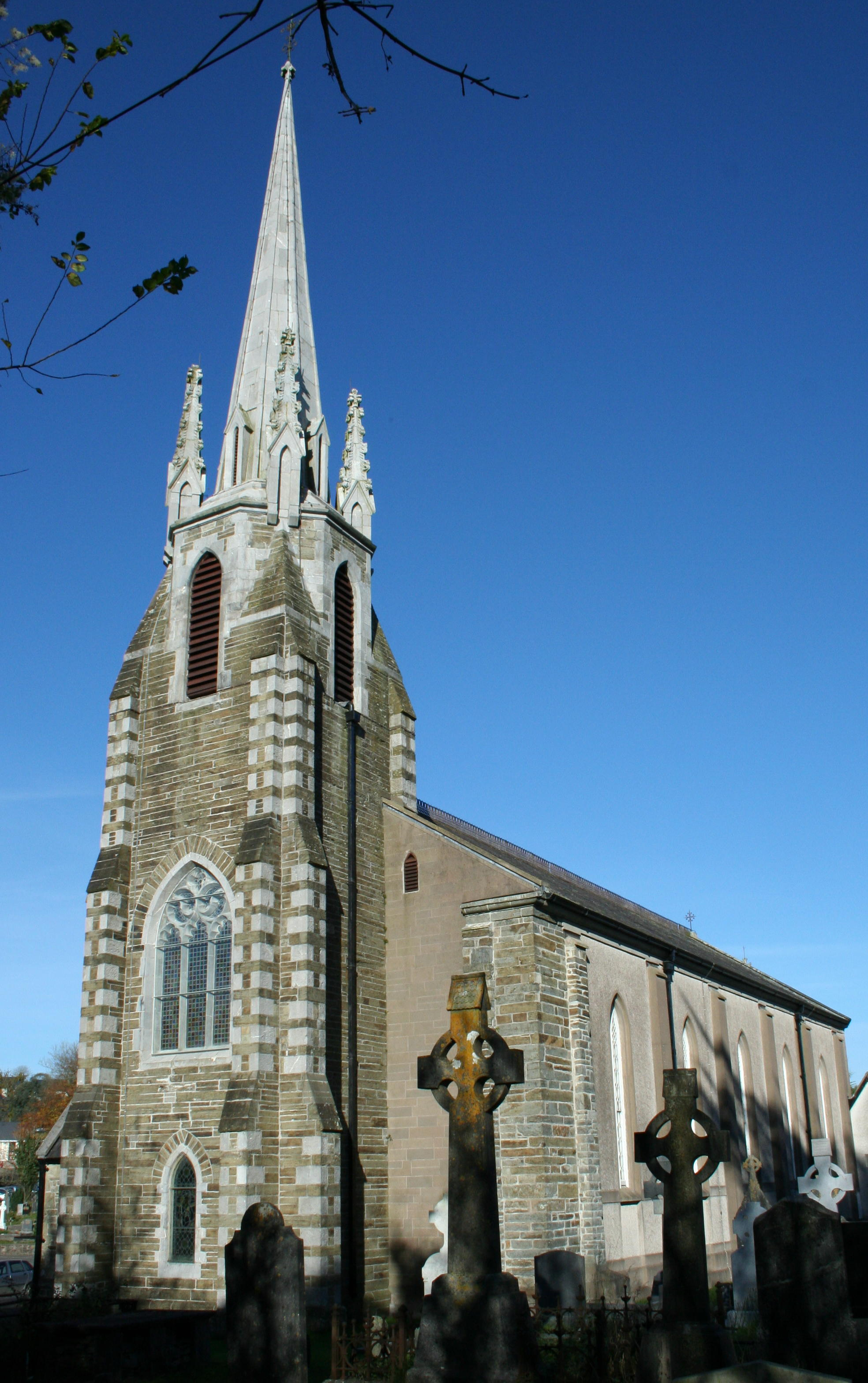
St Mary's Roman Catholic church was built in 1829

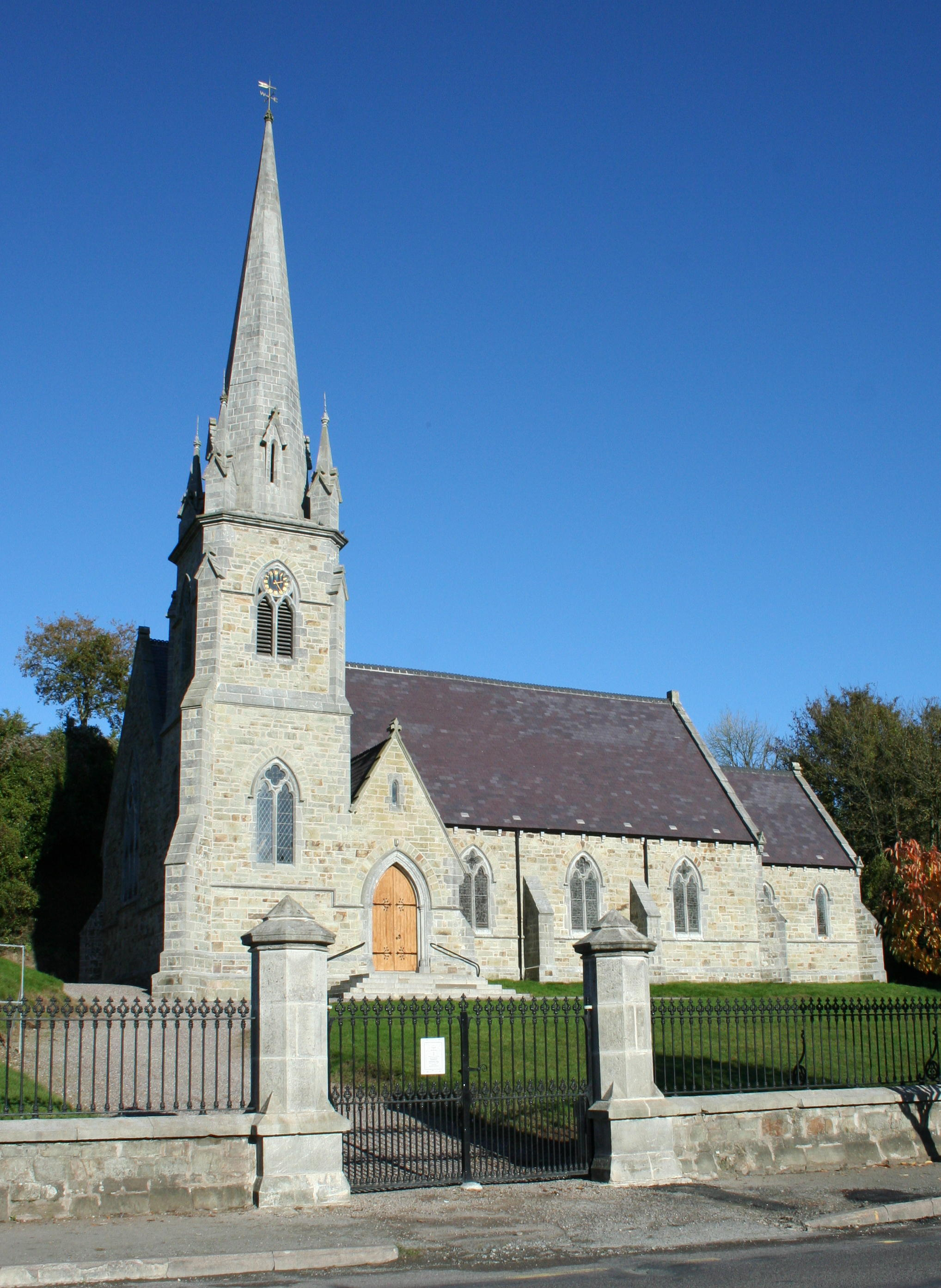
Christ Church, Innishannon, an Anglican church, was built in 1856

The parish of Innishannon stretches from the nearby Dromkeen to close to Aherla and over to Kilmacsimon in the east. The parish includes the village of Crossbarry. It also includes John Coleman's house in Togher Upper. The parish has four schools; Scoil Eoin in the village of Innishannon itself, Knockavilla to the north of the parish opposite St. Patrick's Church - the second church of the parish, Gurrane National School (sometimes called Gurranes) near Crossbarry, and Castleack National School near the parish's boundary with Bandon.

== Amenities ==
The village has two food stores, a doctor's surgery, a dentist, a pharmacy, a butcher, a hairdresser, a café, a credit union, a fast food restaurant, a Chinese restaurant, a car sales garage and three public houses.

Innishannon's Gaelic Athletic Association pitch, home to Valley Rovers GAA club, is sometimes flooded because of its proximity to the river. The local soccer club is Innishvilla AFC.

== People ==
Innishannon is home of the author Alice Taylor who wrote the bestselling To School Through the Fields, and Quench the Lamp, as well as many other novels and collections of poetry.

Valley Rovers GAA club has provided the national Gaelic Athletic Association organisation with two presidents, Seán McCarthy and Con Murphy.

== See also ==
- List of towns and villages in Ireland
- Market Houses in Ireland
