= Christ Church, Innishannon =

Anglican church in Cork, Ireland

Christ Church
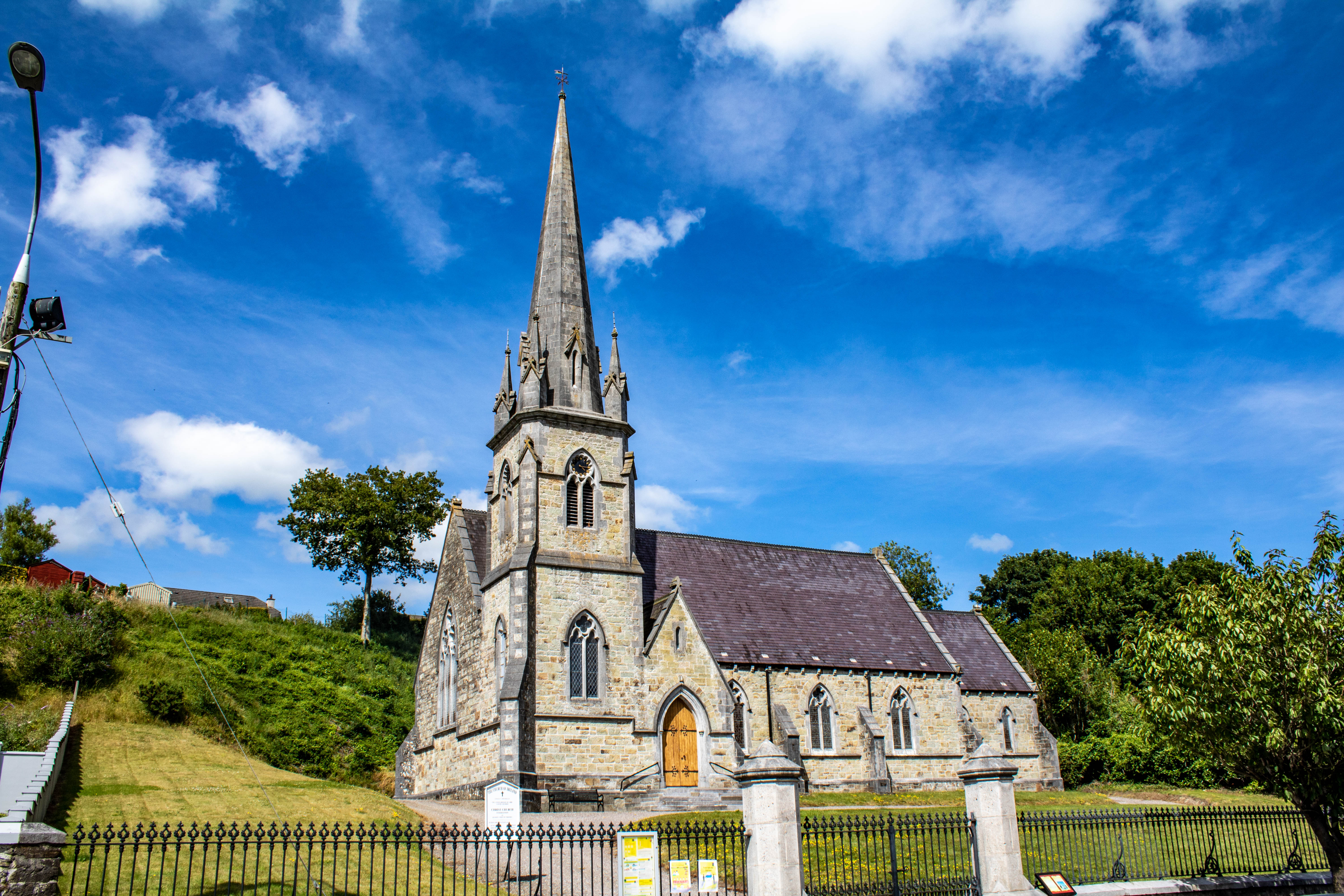

- Location within Ireland
- Christ Church
- 51°45′56″N 8°39′35″W
- Country: Ireland
- Denomination: Church of Ireland

History
- Consecrated: 1856

Architecture
- Heritage designation: Protected structure (RPS #00627; RMP #CO097-05402)
- Architect: Joseph Welland
- Style: Gothic Revival
- Years built: 1854–1856

Christ Church is a Gothic Revival Anglican church located in Innishannon, County Cork, Ireland. It was completed in 1856. It is part of the Bandon Union of Parishes, in the Diocese of Cork, Cloyne, and Ross. The building is listed on Cork County Council's Record of Protected Structures.

== History ==
Christ Church replaced an earlier, 18th century church dedicated to St Mary. The church was constructed between 1854 and 1856. It was consecrated in 1856.

Christ Church is a constituent church of the Bandon Union of Parishes, of which Denic MacCarthy is the canon.

== Architecture ==
Christ Church was designed by Joseph Welland, and is built in the Gothic Revival style. It was built by either James Hunter, or James Turner. The church is composed of a four-bay buttressed nave, a two-stage tower, a gabled porch, a transept, and a vestry.

The stained-glass altar window was designed by Henry Holiday, and the west window designed by Heaton, Butler, and Bayne.
