= Innishannon Tower =

Ruin of a Huguenot chapel tower

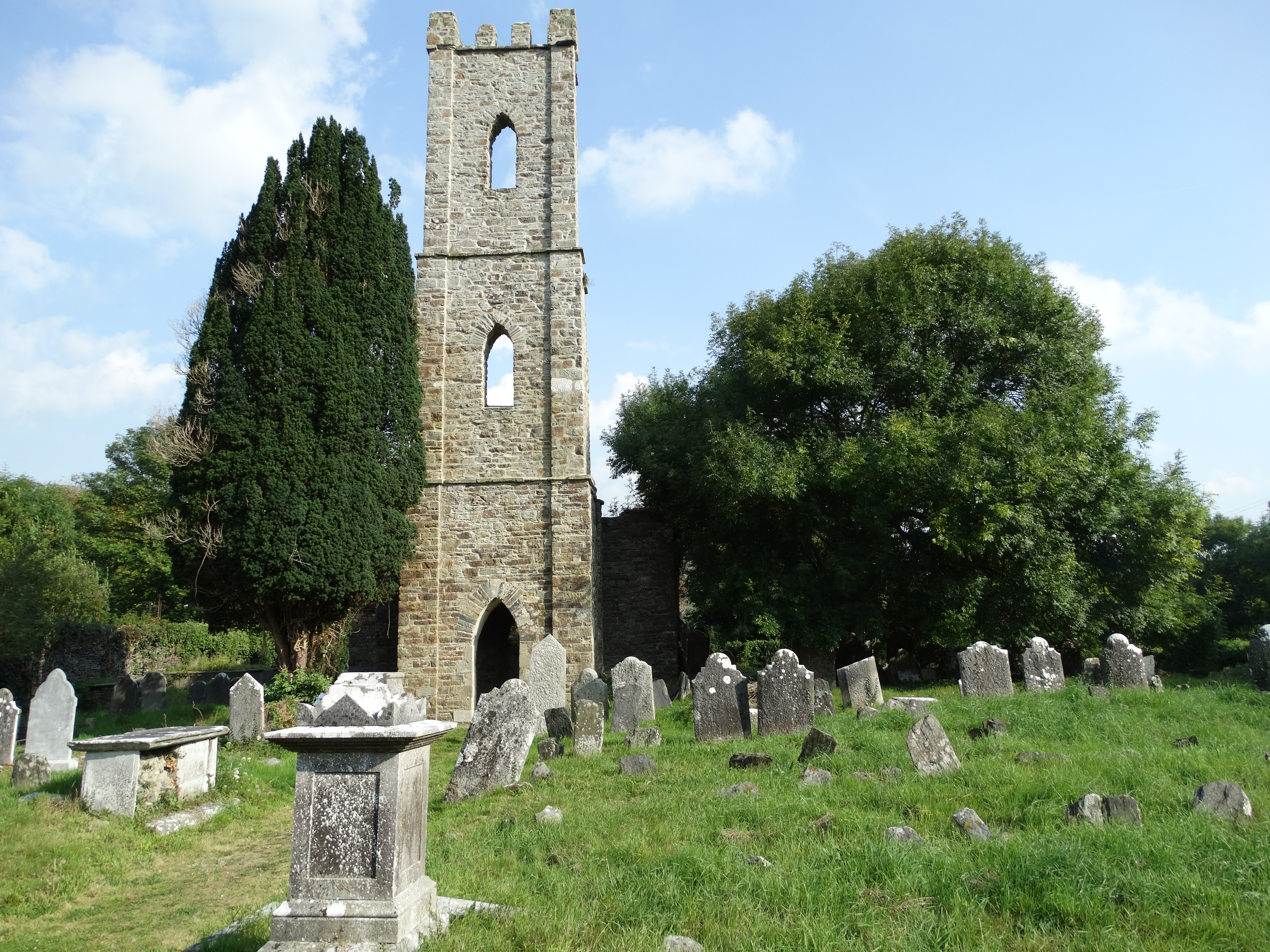
- Tower at Innishannon

- Location within Ireland

Location
- Location: Innishannon, County Cork, Ireland
- Interactive map of Innishannon Tower
- Coordinates: 51°45′49″N 8°39′21″W

Architecture
- Height (max): 22 m (72 ft)

Innishannon Tower is the ruin of a Huguenot chapel tower built beside the original church and graveyard in the town of Innishannon, County Cork.

== Tower ==
There are two currently working churches in the town of Innishannon, one Catholic and one Church of Ireland. Beside the River Bandon is the abandoned St. Mary's church and graveyard, probably initially Cistercian, which has been both throughout its history. It became a Church of Ireland building in the 16th century and was in use until the new church was completed in the mid 19th century.

The original handover of the land was by the Church of Ireland to Cork County Council. There was a serious collapse of the tower in 2007. The locals campaigned to have the tower restored.

St Mary's Church tower was officially handed over by Cork County Council to the care of the local Tidy Towns committee on 21 November 2013.
