= Ballinacarriga Castle =

- Béal na Carraige (Irish)
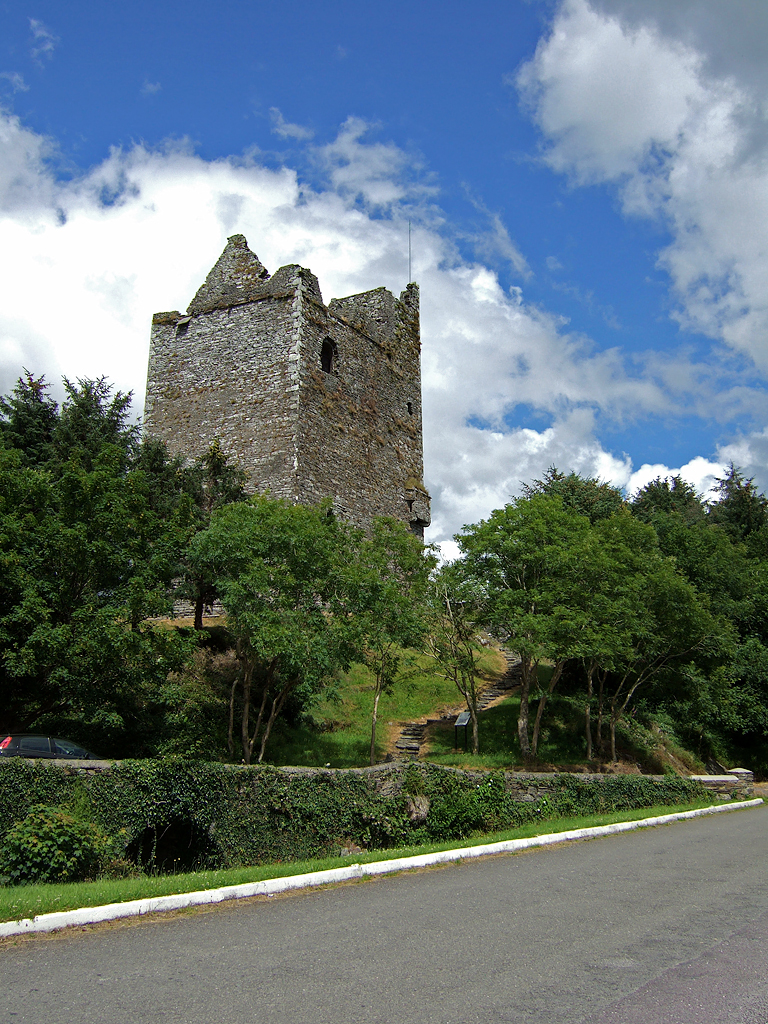
- Ballinacarriga Castle
- Interactive map of Ballinacarriga Castle
- 51°42′21″N 9°1′54″W
- Location: Dunmanway, County Cork, Ireland

History
- Built: c. 1585

National monument of Ireland
- Official name: Ballynacarriga Castle
- Reference no.: 425

Ballinacarriga Castle (Béal na Carraige in Irish, meaning Mouth of the Rock) is a 16th-century tower house located in the village of Ballinacarriga, about 9 kilometres (5.6 mi) from the town of Dunmanway and 7.5 kilometres (4.7 miles) from the village of Ballineen. It is a ruin but in good structural condition. There is also a school nearby.

== History ==
Ballinacarriga was built in the sixteenth century by the native Ó Muirthile (O’Hurley) family. Following the 1641 rebellion, which began as an attempt at a coup by the Irish Catholic gentry to take control of the administration of Ireland, then directed by the Kingdom of England, and to obtain greater concessions for Catholics, the Ó Muirthile family lost possession of the structure and their lands. It is thought that the castle passed into the hands of the McCarthy who controlled that area, then passed into the hands of the Hurley as the clans were friends by kin. In 1654, the Hurley lost the castle, which passed to the Protestant Crofts.

For a time, a room in the tower was used for Roman Catholic worship, and it still bears some decoration from that usage. The building remains in good structural condition but is not open to the public.

== Architecture ==
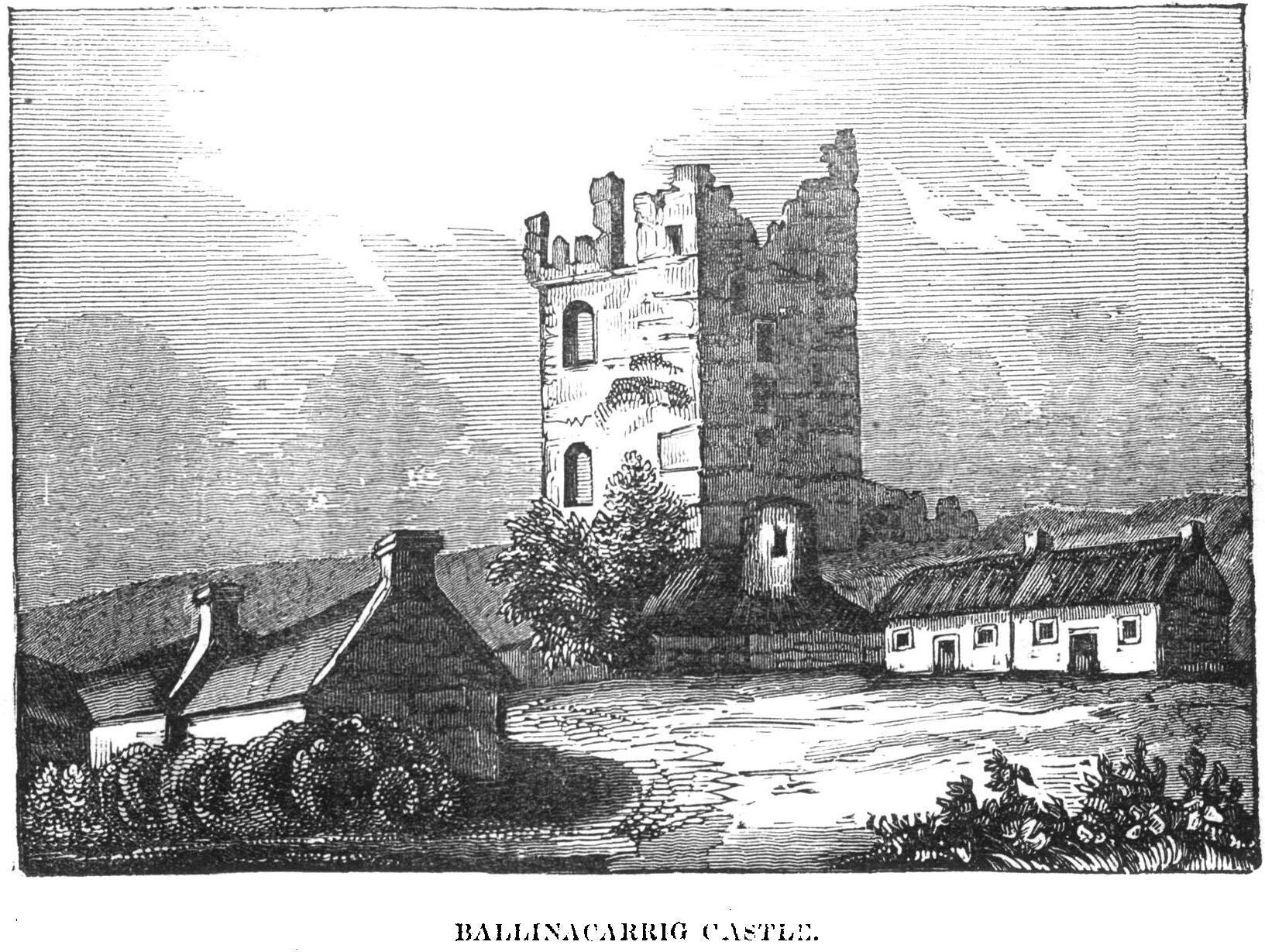
Ballinacarrig Castle, Dublin Penny Journal, 1834

The castle features several defensive features such as bartizans, which are overhanging turrets that project from the walls of medieval fortifications and are often equipped with arrow slits. In addition, there is evidence that the castle once had a machicolation (an opening through which boiling liquids and stones were thrown at enemies) and, unusually, a portcullis. On the eastern side of the castle, about halfway up, there is also a Sheela Na Gig, a figurative sculpture of a naked woman displaying an exaggerated vulva. These sculptures are found throughout Europe, especially in Ireland, Great Britain, France and Spain, on cathedrals, castles and other buildings. Scholars do not agree on the origin of these figures. A popular theory is that the sculptures were used to ward off death, evil and demons. Other theories suggest that the figures represent a fertility goddess or pre-Christian mother. However, their origin and meaning remain uncertain.

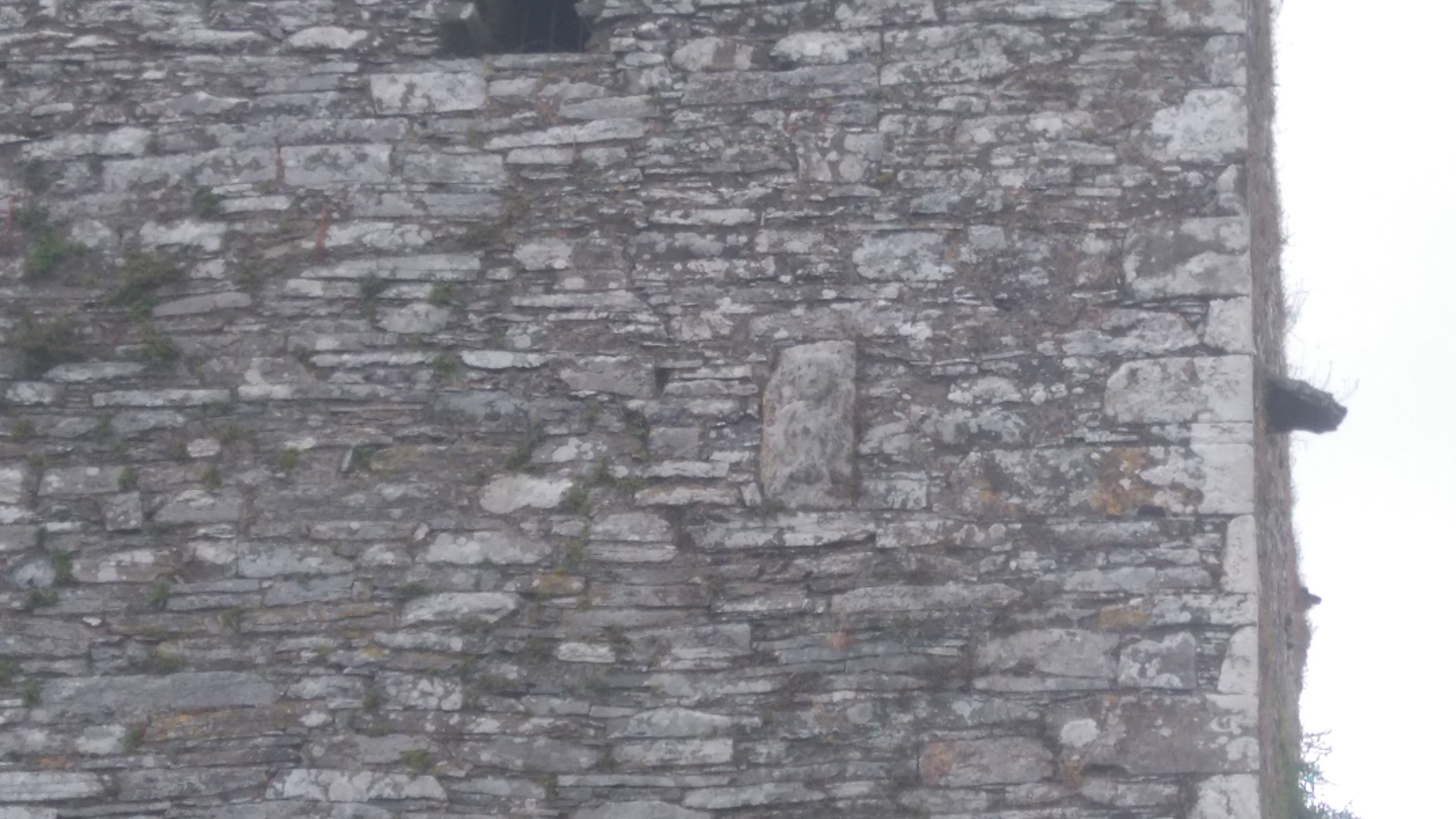
Sheela Na Gig on Ballinacarriga Castle

== See also ==
- List of castles in Ireland
