= Daniel MacCarthy Glas =

London-born Irish writer

Daniel MacCarthy (Glas)
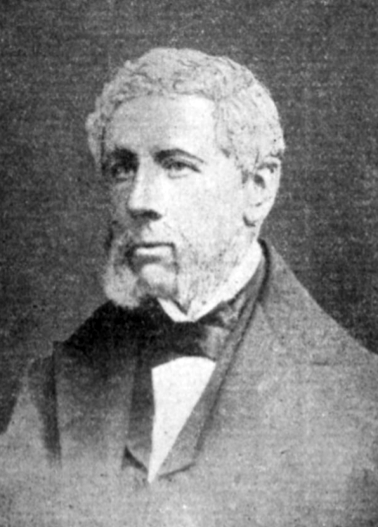
- Born: 28 April 1807; London, United Kingdom
- Died: 9 April 1884 (aged 76); Southampton, United Kingdom
- Education: St. Edmund's, Old Hall Green, Hertfordshire
- Occupations: Author and historian
- Years active: 1840–1880
- Notable work: (i) The Life and Letters of Florence MacCarthy Reagh, Tanist of Carbery, MacCarthy Mór (ii) A Historical Pedigree of the Sliochd Feidhlimidh, the MacCarthys of Gleannacroim
- Spouse: Harriet Alexandrina Bassett Popham (1804–1847)
- Parent(s): Daniel MacCarthy and Mary Anne Ward

Daniel MacCarthy (Glas) (Irish Dónaill Mac Cárthaigh; 28 June 1807 – 9 April 1884) was a writer of historical fiction, Irish history and biography, born in London of Irish descent. MacCarthy was in correspondence with a large circle of archaeologists, antiquarians, and early pioneers of Irish scholarship during the Irish historical awakening of the 19th century, as evidenced in letters found in collections such as the Royal Irish Academy and Cork City and County Archives.

== Life ==
MacCarthy was born into an Irish shipping and coal merchant family of Wellclose Square, East London. After receiving his education at the Roman Catholic school, St. Edmund's College, MacCarthy resided a number of years on the continent. In Naples, at the age of 25, he married the daughter of Admiral Sir Home Popham. Together they had a daughter and two sons, of whom only one outlived MacCarthy.

Being of independent means, MacCarthy initially focused on producing historic novels, including: The Siege of Florence, Massaniello and The Free Lance. In 1867, MacCarthy published his first scholarly work, The Life and Letters of Florence MacCarthy Reagh, which detailed the biography of kinsman Florence MacCarthy Reagh (1560–1640). This was followed by a second work in 1875, A Historical Pedigree of the Sliochd Feidhlimidh, the MacCarthys of Gleannacroim, which documents the genealogy of numerous members of a west Cork sept of the MacCarthy Clan, from whom he claimed descent.

In the course of his genealogical research, MacCarthy established links to his paternal family's homeplace of Dunmanway. He gave generously to many causes in the district, including the education of children. However, the failure of the Overend and Gurney Bank in 1866 reduced MacCarthy's income. His scheme to buy out his ancestral property in the neighbourhood of Dunmanway, including the castle at Togher, was never fulfilled.

== Personal genealogy and DNA testing ==
Daniel's paternal grand-uncle Denis emigrated from Dunmanway in the mid-1700s, and became a prosperous shipowner and coal merchant in London. MacCarthy's first cousin was Sir Charles Justin MacCarthy, Governor of Ceylon, and son-in-law of Sir Benjamin Hawes.

MacCarthy traced his ancestry to the Lords of Gleannacroim, cousins of the MacCarthy Reagh sept, and adopted the "Glas" agnomen earlier associated with that sept to his name. However, as a result of a direct male descendant of MacCarthy partaking in a Y-DNA study, MacCarthy's paternal genetic origins have been shown to differ considerably from those described in his genealogical work.

== The Daniel MacCarthy (Glas) Archive ==
In 2017, approximately 2,000 documents assembled from MacCarthy's research and family memorabilia were donated to the Cork City and County Archive by descendants, Don and Susan, née MacCarthy, of Oregon, USA. These include a 1784 family pedigree compiled by John Collins of Myross, which has been described as of "immense cultural and historical significance", as well as a rare copy of a 1567 map of ‘Hibernia’ by John Goghe.
