= Dunmanway =

Town in County Cork, Ireland

Dunmanway Dúnmaonmhuí
- Town
- Dún Mánmhaí
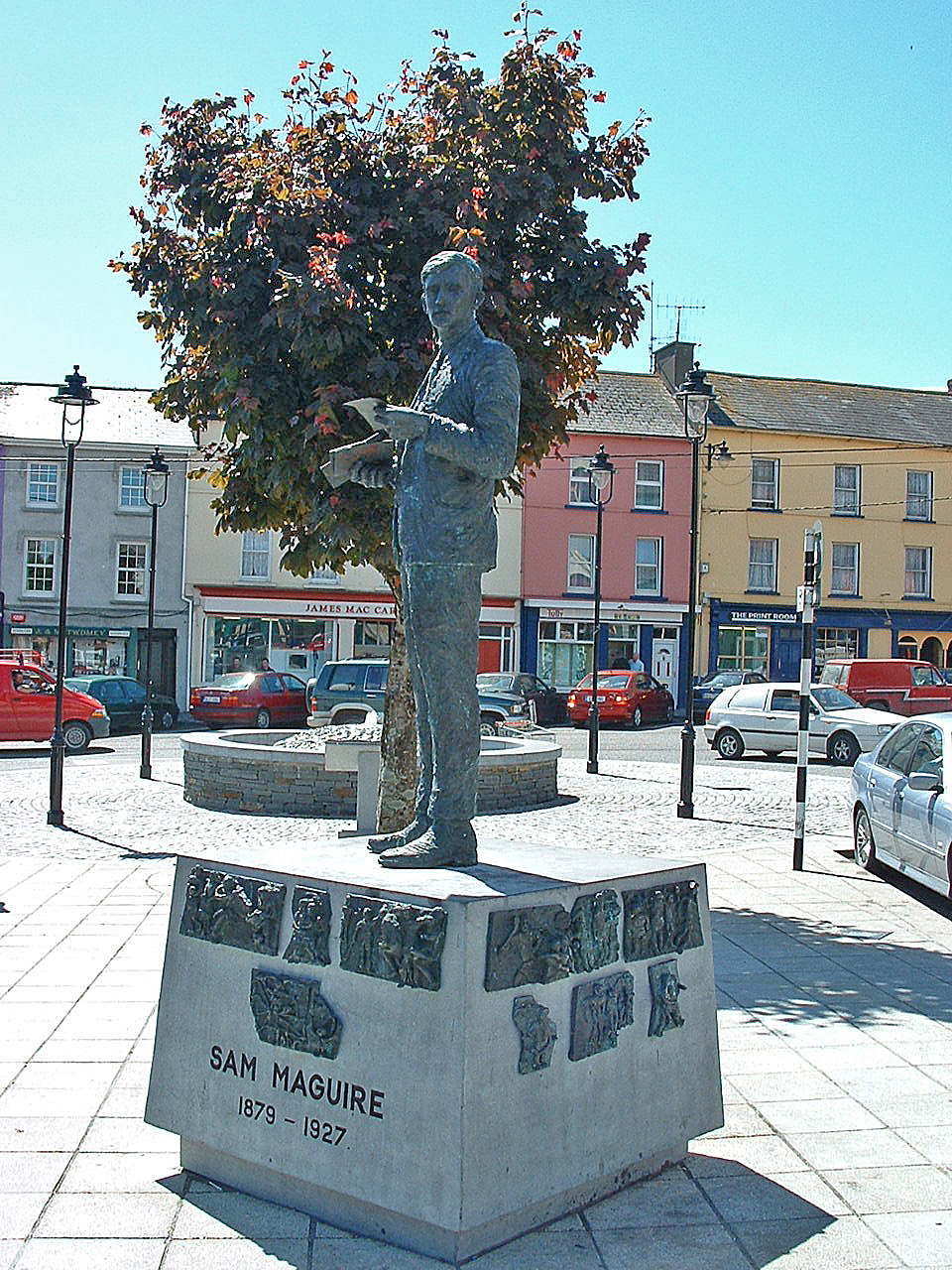
- Statue of Sam Maguire in the town square

- Location within Ireland
- Coordinates: 51°43′15″N 9°6′46″W
- Country: Ireland
- Province: Munster
- County: Cork
- Town charter: 23 November 1693

Population (2022)
  - Total: 1,964
- Time zone: UTC0 (WET)
  - Summer (DST): UTC+1 (IST)
- Area code: 023
- Website: visitdunmanway.ie

Dunmanway (Irish: Dúnmaonmhuí, official Irish name: Dún Mánmhaí) is a market town in County Cork, in the southwest of Ireland. It is the geographical centre of the region known as West Cork. It is the birthplace of Sam Maguire, an Irish Protestant republican, for whom the trophy of the All-Ireland Senior Football Championship is named. The town centre is built on and around two rivers, which are tributaries of the larger River Bandon, which passes by at the east end of the town.

The town is twinned with Quéven, France. Dunmanway won the Irish Tidy Towns Competition in 1982. The town came to national and international attention in 2009 when Liverpool Football Club played a pre-season soccer friendly in the area.

The population of Dunmanway at the 2011 census was 1,585, rising to 1,964 by the 2022 census.

== Name ==
The town's Irish language name is rendered, among other variations, as Dúnmaonmhuí or Dún Mánmhaí. A number of derivations are given for the meaning and origin of the town's name. For example, in Irish Local Names Explained (first published in 1870), the historian and etymologist Patrick Weston Joyce gives the meaning as "the fort of the gables (or pinnacles)". In A Topographical Dictionary of Ireland, published by Samuel Lewis in 1837, it is given as meaning "the castle of the yellow river" or "the castle on the little plain", referring to a MacCarthy castle in the area. Other sources suggest it means "the fort of the yellow women".

== History ==
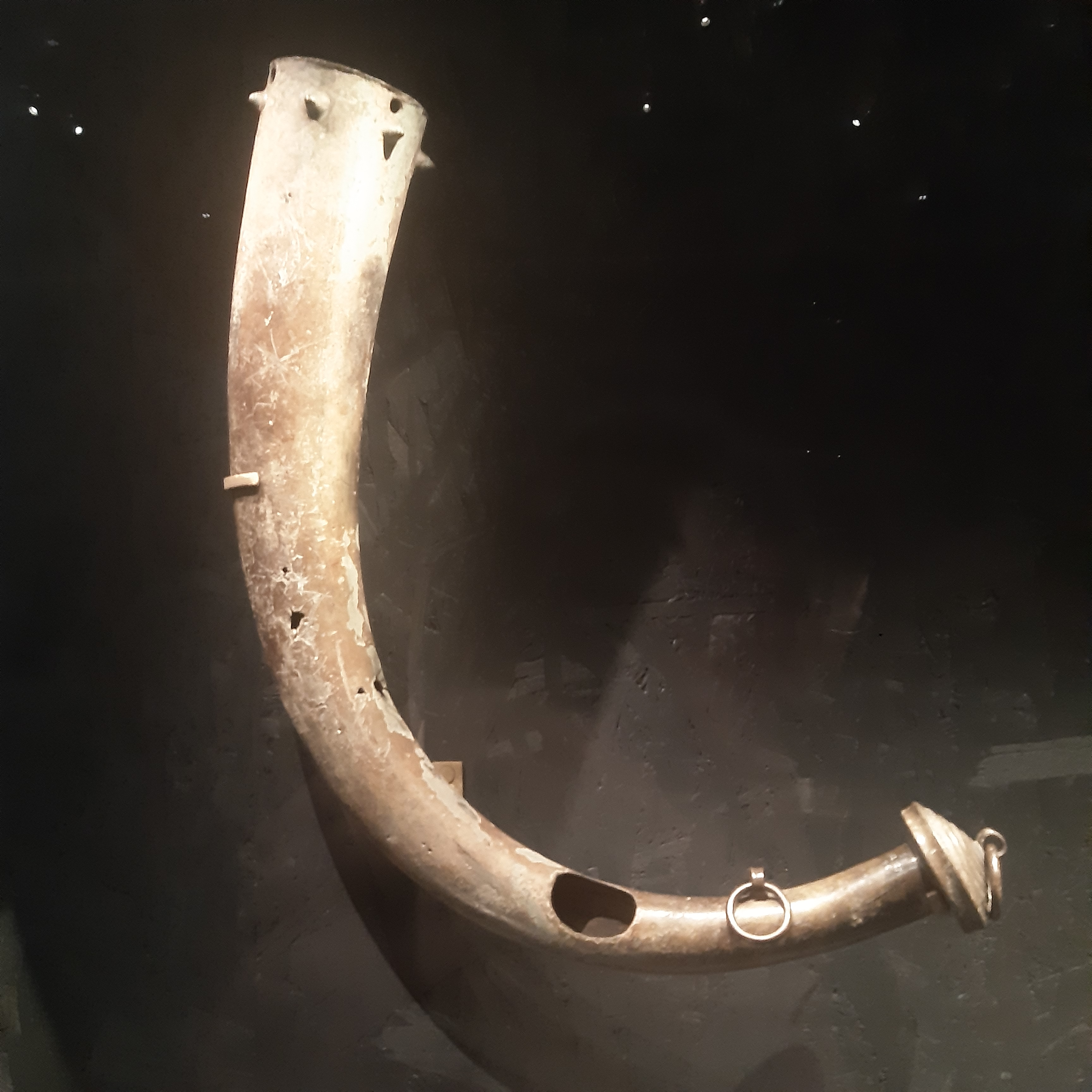
A Bronze Age trumpet, found near Dunmanway, is now held in the British Museum

=== Origins ===
Evidence of ancient settlement in the area includes a number of ringfort, standing stone and ogham stone sites in the townlands of Dunmanway North, Dunmanway South, Demesne and Underhill. A Bronze Age trumpet, discovered in the area, is now held in the British Museum.

From the mid-13th to the late 17th century the surrounding districts of the town of Dunmanway were included in the territory of the MacCarthy Clan.

=== Dunmanway Castle and the MacCarthys of Gleannacroim ===
Dunmanway Castle once stood on a bank of the Sally River on the left-hand side of present-day Castle Street. It was one of the chief residences of the MacCarthy Lords of Gleannacroim, cousins of the MacCarthy Reagh sept. Dating from the late 15th century, the tower house is recorded to have been built by Catherine Fitzgerald. There was likely a small settlement in the environs of the castle.

In 1590, Dunmanway and its hinterlands were surrendered and regranted as freehold under English tenure to Tadhg-an-Fhorsa MacCarthy being part of the sept's ancestral lands. In 1615, under King James I, a charter reaffirmed his possession of the manor and manorial privileges, including the right to hold a Saturday market at Kilbarrah (now Kilbarry), an annual fair at Ballyhallowe (now Ballyhalwick) on 24 September and legal jurisdiction through a court of pie powder. These grants reflect an earlier phase of Crown-sponsored territorial consolidation in the Dunmanway area, preceding the 17th-century colonial developments.

=== Planned development ===
By the late 17th century, much of the MacCarthy estate had been forfeited and Sir Richard Cox—Lord Chancellor of Ireland (1703-1707)—soon began acquiring extensive lands in the Dunmanway area. This included property previously granted to the Cromwellian officer Lieutenant-Colonel William Arnopp.

Cox was the town's most influential early patron. In 1693, he obtained a grant from King William III to hold regular market days and fairs in Dunmanway. According to 19th-century sources, the emerging town was also established to serve as a strategic rest point for troops moving between Bandon and Bantry. Cox initiated a programme of planned settlement and development, playing a central role in shaping the early economy of the town, particularly by promoting the development of the flax and linen industry. To that end, Cox brought skilled artisans from Ulster to train others in the required techniques. He sponsored numerous incentives to stimulate production. These included rent-free housing for top producers, bonuses for efficient labourers, rewards for schoolgirls who demonstrated strong loom skills, and production contests with generous prizes.

In 1700, around thirty families lived in the town. As of 1735, the town comprised forty houses and a population estimated at between 200 and 300 residents. By 1747, the linen industry was well established and Cox's personal census recorded 557 people; two years later, the population had risen to 807.

Free-market economic policies in England led to the removal of protective duties on linen in 1827. In 1837, Samuel Lewis's Topographical Dictionary of Ireland recorded a population of 2,738. It also noted the town's shifting economic fortunes:

"The manufacture of linen continued to flourish for some years, but at present there are very few looms at work. A porter and ale brewery, established in 1831, produces 2,600 barrels annually; there are also two tanyards and two boulting-mills, the latter capable of grinding annually 15,000 bags of flour, and there are two or three smaller mills in the vicinity. Since 1810 a considerable trade in corn has been carried on."

=== Great Famine ===
West Cork was hit hard by the 1840s Great Famine. On 9 February 1847, U.S. Vice President George M. Dallas chaired a famine relief meeting in Washington, D.C. where participants heard a letter addressed to the "Ladies of America" from the women of The Dunmanway Indian Meal Ladies' Committee:

"Oh! that our American sisters could see the labourers on our roads, able-bodied men, scarcely clad, famishing with hunger, with despair in their once cheerful faces, staggering at their work ... oh! that they could see the dead father, mother or child, lying coffinless and hear the screams of the survivors around them, caused not by sorrow, but by the agony of hunger."

In the early 1850s, following the migrations and evictions which characterized the famine's upheavals, more than seventy percent of Dunmanway residents did not own any land.

=== War of Independence ===
On 28 November 1920, during the Irish War of Independence (1919–1921), seventeen British Auxiliary Division troops were killed by the Irish Republican Army at the Kilmichael Ambush (near Dunmanway). The subsequent sacking and burning of the city of Cork by the British forces is thought to be linked to the Kilmichael Ambush. On 15 December 1920, an Auxiliary shot dead the local priest, Canon Magner, for refusing to toll his church's bells on Armistice Day; a local boy, Tadhg Crowley, was also killed in an apparently random incident. There were numerous other actions in and around Dunmanway during the war. In addition, after a truce was declared in July 1921, the local IRA killed a number of alleged informers. Controversy continues in particular over the killing of ten men (including three residents of Dunmanway) in the spring of 1922, all of whom were Protestants. These events are sometimes known as the Dunmanway killings.

=== Late 20th century ===
Between 1975 and 1999, Swedish multinational firm Mölnlycke Health Care operated a manufacturing facility in Dunmanway. The plant employed over 250 people at its peak.

== Demographics ==
Historical population
Year	Pop.	±%
1821	2,012	—
1831	2,738	+36.1%
1841	3,086	+12.7%
1851	2,212	−28.3%
1861	2,068	−6.5%
1871	2,046	−1.1%
1881	2,049	+0.1%
1891	2,007	−2.0%
1901	1,776	−11.5%
1911	1,619	−8.8%
1926	1,565	−3.3%
1936	1,561	−0.3%
1946	1,475	−5.5%
1951	1,439	−2.4%
1956	1,492	+3.7%
1961	1,411	−5.4%
1966	1,406	−0.4%
1971	1,392	−1.0%
1981	1,493	+7.3%
1986	1,382	−7.4%
1991	1,404	+1.6%
1996	1,427	+1.6%
2002	1,532	+7.4%
2006	1,522	−0.7%
2011	1,585	+4.1%
2016	1,655	+4.4%
2022	1,964	+18.7%

As of the 2016 census, the population (of 1,655) included a small number of people from the United Kingdom, Poland, Lithuania and elsewhere within the European Union. By the 2022 census, the population had grown to 1,964. Of these, approximately 85% were born in Ireland, 6% in the United Kingdom, 3% in Poland, 4% in other EU countries, with less than 2% (39 people) born in other parts of the world.

== Religion and places of worship ==
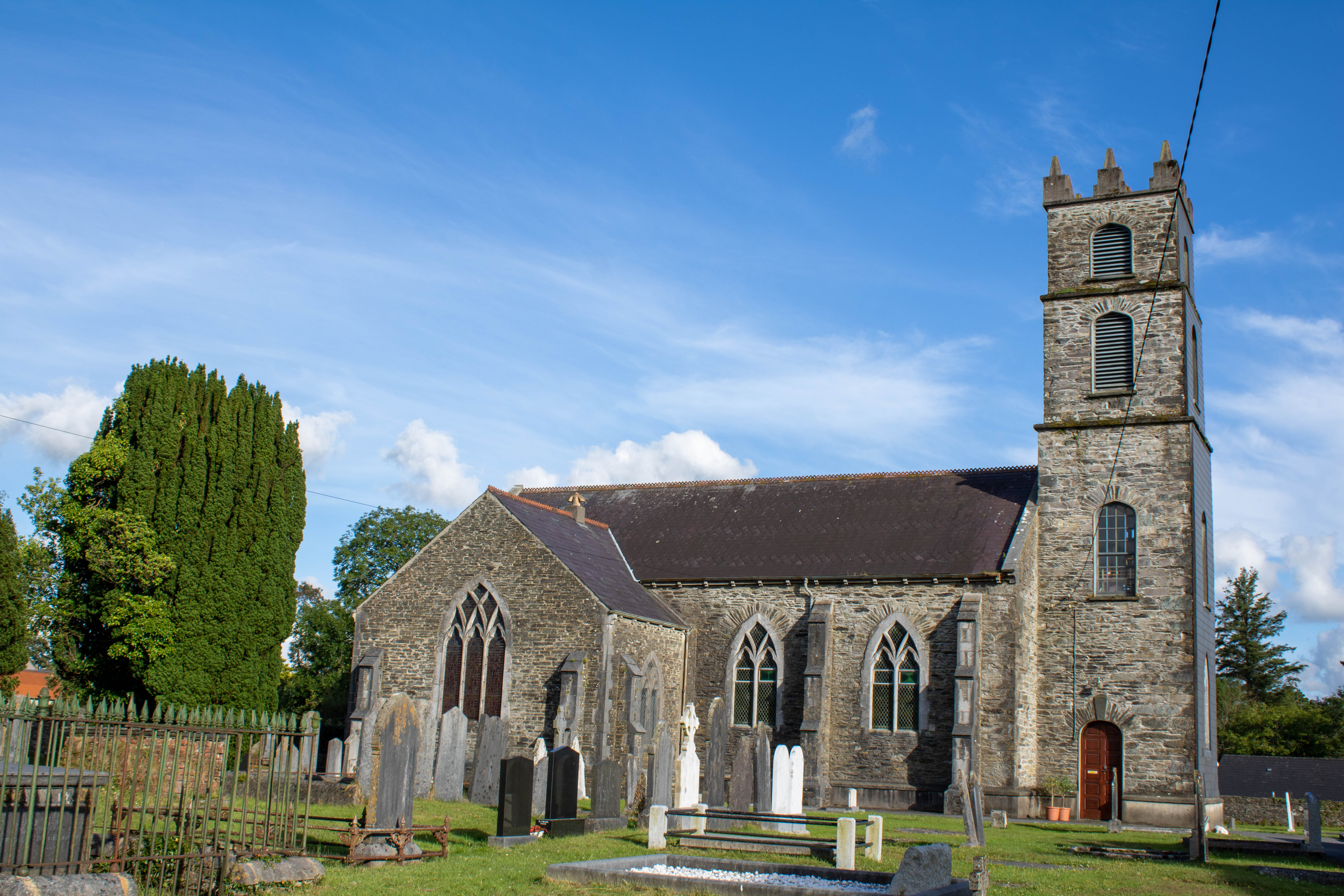
St Mary's Dunmanway.

Dunmanway is in the Catholic parish of Dunmanway within the Roman Catholic Diocese of Cork and Ross, and in the Church of Ireland parish of Fanlobbus, part of the Diocese of Cork, Cloyne and Ross. According to the 2016 census, the majority of the population identified as Roman Catholic, while the 2022 census recorded approximately 70% identifying as Catholic, 6% as members of other religions, while 24% were of no religion or no stated religion.

=== Church of Ireland ===
St Mary's Church was rebuilt in 1821 with the aid from the Board of First Fruits. It was constructed on the site of an 18th-century place of worship which had been funded in part by Sir Richard Cox and Rev. John Patrickson, with the support of Bishop Dive Downes. A set of eight commemorative bells, installed in the church tower in 2017 honour Sam Maguire and reflect key themes from Dunmanway’s history, including sport, migration and religious traditions.

=== Roman Catholic church ===
The town's Catholic church, St Patrick's, was built between 1831 and 1848 under the direction of Fr James Doheny, to a design by Brother Michael Augustine O'Riordan, on the site of an earlier chapel dating to 1793.

=== Methodist church ===
The Methodist church, built in 1836, now functions as a cultural and heritage centre known as Atkins Hall.

== Events ==
=== Ballabuidhe Festival ===
The Ballabuidhe Festival is held annually over the August Bank Holiday weekend and centres around both the Ballabuidhe Horse Fair and Ballabuidhe Races. The Ballabuidhe Horse Fair dates back to 1615, when King James I granted Randal Óg Hurley a charter to hold a fair at Béal Átha Buidhe on the River Bandon.

=== Dunmanway Agricultural Show ===
The Dunmanway Agricultural Show, first held in 1946, takes place annually on the first Sunday in July at Dromleena Lawn. Contested classes include horses, cattle and horticulture, domestic arts and dogs. The 2025 event marked its 75th outing.

=== Feel the Force Dunmanway ===
A sci-fi and fantasy-themed festival, "Feel the Force Dunmanway", which features cosplay characters, parades and fundraising events was named "Best West Cork Festival" for 2024 at the Southern Star West Cork Business and Tourism Awards.

== Sport ==
=== Gaelic games ===
Dohenys, the local Gaelic Athletic Association (GAA) club, was founded in 1886 and plays its home matches at Sam Maguire Park. The club is named in honour of Michael Doheny, a member of the Young Ireland nationalist movement who sheltered with relatives in Dunmanway in 1848. In 1897, the club won the Cork Senior Football Championship and progressed through the Munster Senior Football Championship to play in the All-Ireland Senior Football Championship final, where they were defeated by Dublin's Kickhams club at Jones' Road.

The club has produced a number of inter-county players. These include Éamonn Young, who was a member of the Cork squad that won the 1945 All-Ireland Senior Football Championship and who captained Cork to victory in the 1952 Munster Senior Championship. Although the club has historically had more success in Gaelic football, Dohenys became Munster Junior B Club Hurling Champions in 2006. As of 2023, Dohenys were competing in the Cork Senior A Football Championship.

=== Soccer ===
The local soccer club is Dunmanway Town, which plays in the Premier Division of the West Cork League. In 2009, it was announced that Liverpool F.C. had agreed to visit Dunmanway to play the club in a pre-season friendly on 6 August 2009. Liverpool, fielding players from their reserve and youth teams (the home side supplemented their line-up with a number of players from other Cork-based clubs like Avondale United and Cobh Ramblers F.C.) won the game by one goal to nil in front of 6,800 spectators.

=== Angling ===
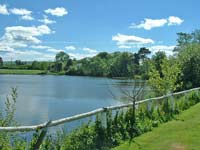
Chapel Lake, Dunmanway

The stretch of the River Bandon which flows east through Dunmanway holds brown trout, sea trout and salmon.

=== Other sports ===
Other sports clubs in the town include rugby, athletics, pitch and putt, badminton and volleyball. Dunmanway's 25m indoor heated swimming pool is the only public swimming pool in the West Cork area.

August 2010 saw the revived "Munster 100" motorcycle road race take place in Dunmanway. This was followed two years later by the first Dunmanway 'Lightning Sprint' Grand Prix motorcycle meet.

Like other parts of County Cork, road bowling events are held in the surrounding area, and the All-Ireland road bowling championships took place in Dunmanway in July 2011.

== Transport ==
Dunmanway is approximately 60 km southwest from Cork City, on the N71 national secondary road, and the R586 regional road. The town is served by Bus Éireann bus service from Cork City.

Dunmanway railway station opened on 12 June 1866 and closed entirely on 1 April 1961.

== People ==
- George Beamish, rugby player for Ireland and the British and Irish Lions in the 1920s and 1930s
- Victor Beamish, RAF ace fighter pilot in WWII
- Lee Carsley, qualified to play for the Republic of Ireland by virtue of his grandmother being from Dunmanway, and was a visitor to the town as a youth
- Richard B. Connolly, American politician
- Thomas Hovenden, painter and teacher
- Con O'Kelly, wrestler, gold medalist at 1908 Olympics
- James MacCarthy, sculptor
- Sam Maguire, Gaelic football player/ Irish republican
- John McCarthy, athlete, silver medalist in discus at 2004 Paralympic Games
- Michael McCarthy, Labour Party politician and former member of Dáil Éireann
- Timothy J. Murphy, Labour Party politician and Minister for Local Government in the First Inter-Party Government
- Darren Sweetnam, former Cork Hurler and Munster Rugby player
- Éamonn Young (Gaelic football), Jim Young and Kevin Murray (hurling), Aoife Murray (camogie) are All-Ireland winners within their GAA codes

== See also ==
- List of towns and villages in Ireland
