= River Bandon =

River in County Cork, Ireland

Coordinates: 51.678°N 8.50333°W

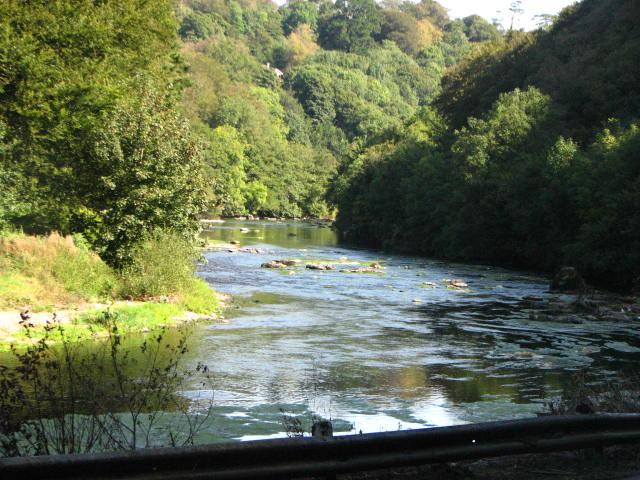
- Near Innishannon
- Native name: Abhainn na Bandan (Irish)

Location
- Country: Ireland

Physical characteristics
- Source
  - location: Shehy Mountains, County Cork
  - elevation: 535 metres (1,755 ft)
- Mouth
  - location: Celtic Sea at Kinsale Harbour
- Length: 72 km (45 mi)
- Basin size: 609 km^{2} (235 sq mi)
- Discharge
  - average: 21.5 m^{3}/s (760 cu ft/s)

The River Bandon (Irish: Abhainn na Bandan, from ban-dea, meaning "goddess") is a river in County Cork, Ireland.

The Bandon rises at Nowen Hill (one of the Shehy Mountains), to the north of Drimoleague. The river then flows to Dunmanway, before turning eastward towards the twin villages of Ballineen and Enniskean. It then makes its way through the centre of Bandon town, and on to Innishannon and Kilmacsimon, before draining into Kinsale Harbour on Ireland's south coast.

Tributaries include the Sally River and the Brewery River at Dunmanway, the "Small Blackwater" near Ballineen, and the Bridewell River at Bandon. The river is crossed by a total of 15 bridges (including two footbridges). There were also four railway bridges, one of which is still intact (on farmland near Dunmanway). The remains of the others—near Murragh, Bandon, and Innishannon—consist only of abutments and/or piers, with the spans having been removed.

== Angling ==
The River Bandon is famous for its Atlantic salmon fishing: the biggest recorded salmon caught in Ireland since 1991 was landed by Bill Canning of Goresbridge, County Kilkenny on 7 July 2008. Mr Canning's salmon weighed 28 lbs 3 oz (12.8 kg) and is on display in the Munster Arms hotel in Bandon town.

== Floods ==
On 19 and 20 November 2009 the river burst its banks for the first time in many years, causing large-scale flood damage to Bandon town and at other points along the river.

In December 2015, Bandon experienced further flooding as a result of Storm Desmond and Storm Frank.

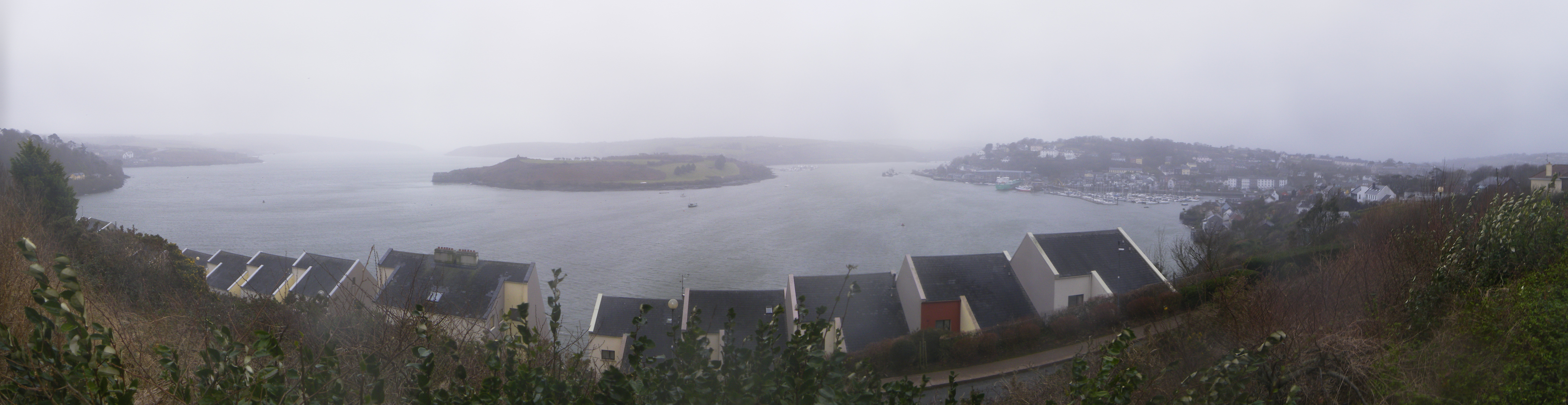
Last meander, with the mouth on the left and Kinsale on the right

== See also ==
- List of rivers of Ireland
- November 2009 Great Britain and Ireland floods
