= James Balfour (died 1845) =

Scottish businessman, landowner and Tory politician

- Born: c. 1775
- Died: 19 April 1845 (aged 69–70)
- Spouse: Eleanor Maitland
- Children: 7, including James and Mary

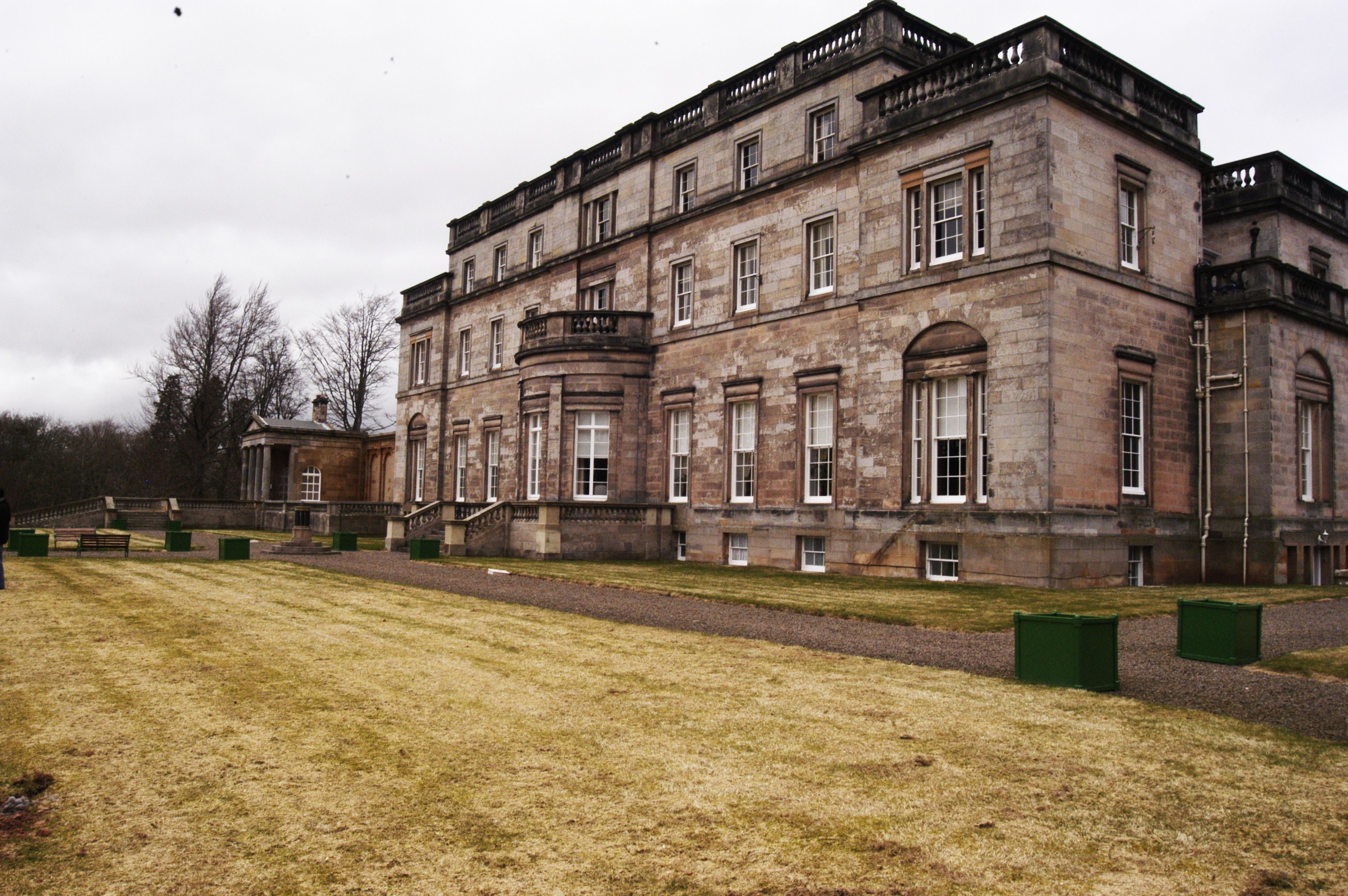
Whittingehame House, Balfour's mansion in East Lothian, Scotland

James Balfour (c. 1775 – 19 April 1845) was a Scottish nabob who became a landowner and politician. The son of a prosperous and influential Scottish gentry family, he became a trader in India. Having made a fortune supplying the Royal Navy, he returned to Scotland to buy several landed estates, including Whittingehame in East Lothian where he built a classical mansion.

Balfour became a Tory Member of Parliament (MP) from 1826 to 1834, but never achieved ministerial office. However, many of his descendants found fame and success, including his grandson Arthur Balfour, who served as prime minister from 1902 to 1905.

At his death, Balfour's estates in Scotland alone were estimated to be worth over £1 million (equivalent to £105 million in 2025).

== Family and early life ==
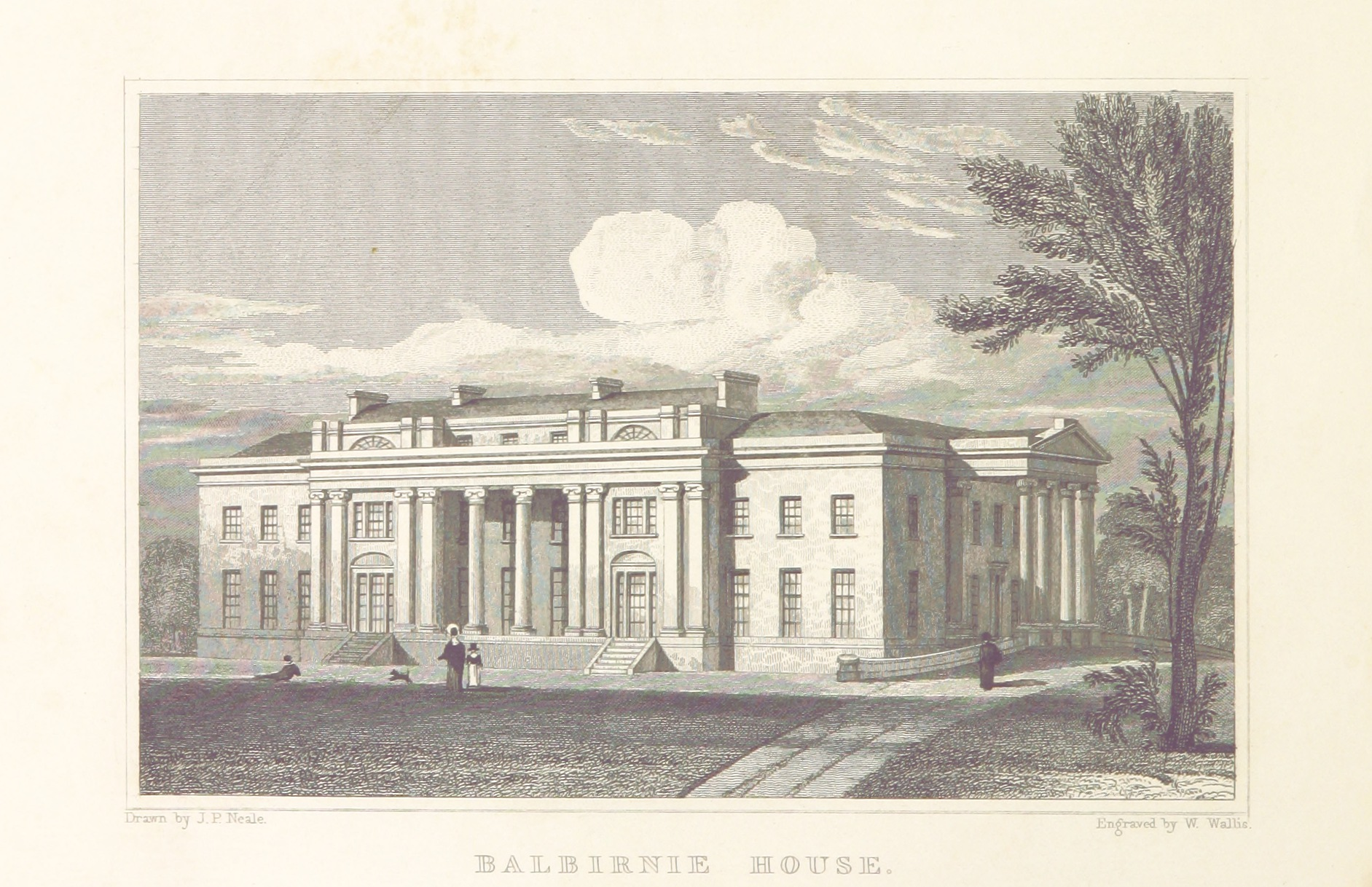
Balbirnie House in Fife, Balfour's birthplace

Balfour was born about 1775. He was the second son of John Balfour (1739–1813), an advocate who owned Balbirnie House, near the town of Glenrothes in Fife. His elder brother Robert Balfour, who inherited Balbirnie, became a lieutenant-general in the British Army.

His ancestor George Balfour had purchased Balbirnie in the late 16th or early 17th century, and by the late 18th century its land included profitable mines in the Fife Coalfield.

== Career ==
=== India ===
After studying book-keeping and accountancy in Edinburgh, Balfour went to Madras in March 1795 as a writer (junior clerk) for the British East India Company. He held several posts in the following years, before being sent back to Britain after a disciplinary issue.

Balfour returned to India in 1802, where he became a merchant in partnership with James Baker. His breakthrough came in 1806, when the partners obtained the contract with the Victualling Commissioners of the Royal Navy to supply their needs throughout the East Indies.

The contract had been held since 1796 by the Hon. Basil Cochrane, who had built his own flour mills and bakeries in Madras. Cochrane returned to England in 1806 due to ill-health, and had intended to appoint Balfour and Baker as his agents. However, before leaving, Cochrane was notified that the Navy was reviewing his accounts dating back to 1794, and that the Navy had lost much of the paperwork. He then returned to England permanently to settle the accounts, which took until 1820.

Instead of engaging agents, Cochrane passed the contract to Balfour and Baker, who held it until at least 1815. At some point the partnership was dissolved, and the contract held by Balfour alone. When he left India, he had accumulated a fortune of £300,000 (equivalent to £29 million in 2025).

The Indian business did not end with Balfour's return home. It was run on his behalf by agents, and within a few decades the family's assets had grown ten-fold to £3 million (equivalent to £290 million in 2025).

=== Scotland ===
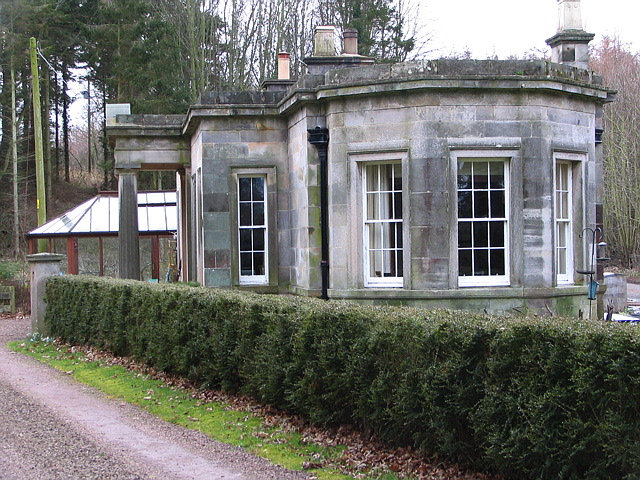
The east lodge of Balfour's Whittingehame estate, possibly also designed by Robert Smirke

On his return to Scotland in 1815, Balfour married Lady Eleanor Maitland (1790–1869), daughter of the Tory politician James Maitland, 8th Earl of Lauderdale. They had seven children, three of whom predeceased their parents. The eldest son was killed by a fire in 1822.

Within two years of their marriage, Balfour had bought two large county estates. The first was a sporting estate with shooting lodge in the Highlands, at Strathconan in Ross-shire. In 1817, he purchased the 10,000-acre (4,000 ha; 16 sq mi) Whittingehame estate in Haddingtonshire from Colonel William Hay of Duns Castle, which provided a net rental income of £11,000 per year (equivalent to £1,156,000 in 2025). He also bought a town house in London, No. 3 Grosvenor Square.

In the 1820s the Balfours employed the architect Robert Smirke, designer of the British Museum, to build a large classical mansion at Whittingehame, along with a stable block and gate lodges. They equipped their home with French furniture and Sèvres china. Built of pale cullalo stone, the house was expanded and altered in 1827 to the designs of William Burn, which were not entirely successful. Colin McWilliam and Christopher Wilson describe them as having changed "a dry composition into a boring one".

They then rebuilt the local church, and created a new model village to the north-west of the old one. Built in about 1840 of red sandstone, it consists of a row of cottages and a school.

Established as a country gentleman, though known locally as "the nabob", Balfour became a justice of the peace, and in 1822 was appointed as a Deputy Lieutenant of Haddingtonshire.

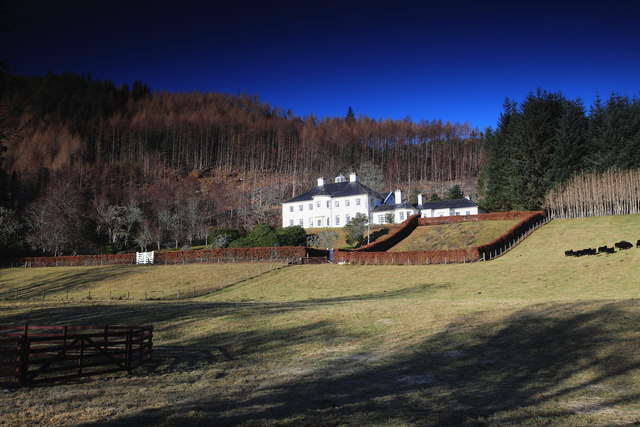
Strathconon (or Strathconan) House, Balfour's hunting lodge in the Scottish Highlands

In about 1823 or 1824 he paid £104,000 (equivalent to £9.87 million in 2025) to buy from the 10th Earl of Leven a large estate in his native Fife, including Balgonie Castle. Adjacent to his native Balbirnie, the Balgonie estate included coal mines which worked seams described as "inexhaustible" and iron workings.

=== Parliament ===
In November 1820, the death of Henry St Paul MP triggered a by-election for the borough of Berwick-upon-Tweed, where Balfour's father-in-law Lord Lauderdale had great influence. Balfour was also supported by Admiral Sir David Milne, who had defeated St Paul at the general election in March 1820 but was unseated on petition in July.

However, Lauderdale was disliked for his opposition to the popular Queen Caroline, which became a significant issue in the campaign. His agents claimed that Balfour would have opposed her trial for alleged adultery, but he was portrayed as too close to Liverpool's Tory ministry to properly represent interests of the borough. After four days of polling, Balfour lost by 9 votes (374—363) to the Whig baronet Sir Francis Blake.

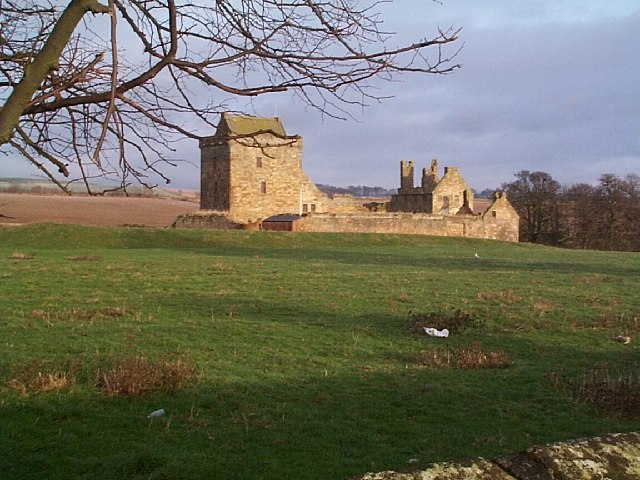
Balgonie Castle in Glenrothes, Fife, in Balfour's Fife estate

A further vacancy occurred in Berwick in 1822, but Balfour did not contest the seat. Instead, he turned his attentions to the Anstruther Burghs, a set of five burghs which were located only 15 miles from his newly purchased estate at Balgonie in Fife. At the 1826 general election he won the support of three burghs of Pittenweem, Anstruther Easter and Crail, whereas the sitting MP and Lord Advocate of Scotland Sir William Rae won only Anstruther Wester and Kilrenny. With three out of five votes Balfour was declared elected, and a petition lodged by Rae was rejected in March 1827.

In 1829, several groups of his constituents submitted petitions against the Roman Catholic Relief Bill. Balfour presented all the petitions to Parliament, but in April he voted with the majority in favour of the Bill.

Balfour was opposed at the 1830 general election by Robert Marsham, the Warden of Merton College, Oxford. However, he won the seat, taking three of the four boroughs remaining after Kilrenny's disenfranchisement in 1829.

At the 1831 general election, Balfour was drafted to stand instead in the county seat of Haddingtonshire, the area which included Whittingehame. The sitting MP Lord John Hay had been an advocate of Parliamentary reform, a view which was supported by the county's voteless tenant farmers but opposed by the existing voters. Lord John's position looked untenable, so Balfour was drafted by Lord Lauderdale and Hay's brother Lord Tweeddale. Describing himself as an opponent of the current reform proposals, but a supporter of a "wise and prudent amendment to the representative system", he won the seat by a margin of 40 votes to the 11 of his opponent Sir David Baird, Bt. However, a crowd of non-voting residents of Haddington shouted down his attempts to make a speech of thanks.

The new Parliament was dominated by the Reform Bills, and in the last Parliament of the Unreformed House of Commons Balfour voted against them at most opportunities. At the general election in December 1832, with the franchise expanded under the Scottish Reform Act, Balfour was re-elected but with a much narrower majority of 271 votes to 232.

His health had been declining, and he cited that as his reason for retiring at the dissolution of Parliament in December 1834. At the general election in January 1835, the Haddingtonshire seat was won by the Whig Robert Ferguson.

== Death and legacy ==
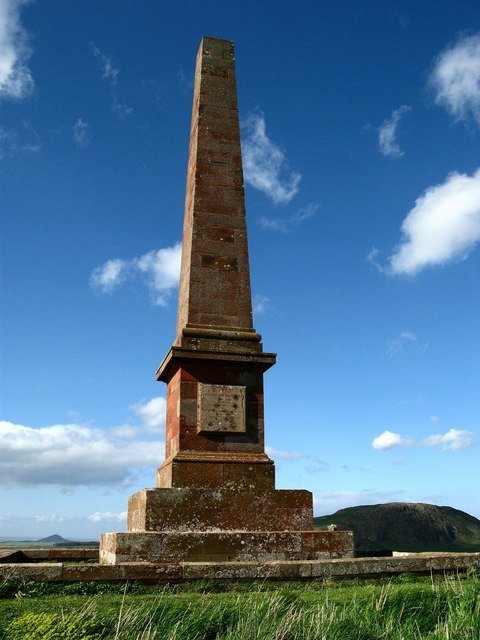
The Balfour Monument, near Whittingehame, erected in memory of Balfour's son James Maitland Balfour

Balfour died at Whittingehame in April 1845, aged about 70. He was survived by his wife, Lady Eleanor, two sons, and two daughters. Another two daughters and a son predeceased him.

The surviving children were:

- James Maitland Balfour (1820–1856), MP for Haddington Burghs 1841–47, father of five sons and three daughters
- Charles Balfour (1823–1872), who married Adelaide Barrington, daughter and 8th child of the 6th Viscount Barrington.
- Mary Balfour (1817–1893), a noted watercolour artist who married Henry Arthur Herbert, owner of the Muckross estate in County Kerry, and Chief Secretary for Ireland 1857–58
- Anna Balfour (1825–1857), who married Lord Augustus Fitzroy, later 7th Duke of Grafton

On his death, Balfour's estate was valued at over £1 million. His widow Eleanor (who survived him by 24 years) was left a legacy of £31,000 and a life annuity of £3,760.

The rest was divided between his children. The estates at Whittingehame and Strathconan were left to his eldest son, along with a house in Grosvenor Square, London. His property in Fife, including Balgonie Castle, was left to his second son Charles, while his daughters Mary and Anna had each been given a dowry of £40,000 (equivalent to £3.87 million in 2025).

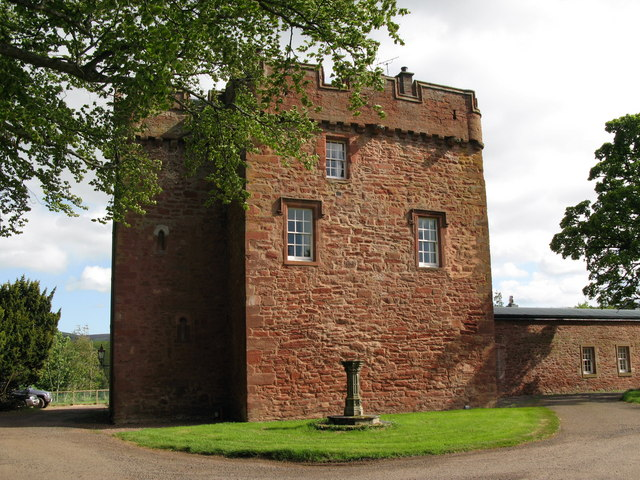
Whittingehame Tower, which is still owned by descendants of James Balfour

Until the Reform Act in 1832, political power in Britain had been dominated for centuries by a land-owning oligarchy, and for another century they shared power with the rising bourgeoisie. The Balfour family straddled both groups. James Balfour's new wealth brought new vigour to the ancient family, with many of his grandchildren and great-grandchildren achieving notability. They include:

- James Maitland Balfour's children:
  - Arthur Balfour, the prime minister of the United Kingdom from 1902 to 1905
  - Eleanor Mildred Sidgwick (1845–1936), principal of Newnham College, Cambridge
  - Alice Blanche Balfour (1850–1936), amateur entomologist
  - Francis Maitland Balfour (1851–1882), one of the greatest biologists of his day
  - Gerald Balfour, 2nd Earl of Balfour (1853–1945), a cabinet minister from 1895 to 1905. His daughter Lady Eve Balfour (1899–1990) was an early advocate of organic farming, and co-founder of the Soil Association
  - Colonel Eustace James Anthony Balfour (1854–1911), an architect who served as ADC to King Edward VII.
- Charles Balfour's son Charles Barrington Balfour became an army officer and an MP. One of his sons was knighted for his work as a diplomat
- Mary's son Henry Arthur Herbert, was MP for Kerry from 1866 to 1880
- Two of Anna's sons became Dukes of Grafton

As with many other estate houses in Scotland, Balfour family ownership of Whittingehame House ended in the 20th century. Arthur and Gerald lost a lot of money in a series of poor investments, particularly in their efforts to develop peat processing as a green alternative to coal-mining. In the 1930s, death duties forced the mothballing of the house and sale of its contents. The building was leased for various purposes before being sold in 1963 to become a residential school, and has since been converted into apartments. The older Whittingehame Tower has been restored and remains the residence of the Earls of Balfour, descendants of James Balfour.

Parliament of the United Kingdom
Preceded by Sir William Rae, Bt	Member of Parliament for Anstruther Easter Burghs; 1826 – 1831	Succeeded by Andrew Johnston
Preceded by Lord John Hay	Member of Parliament for Haddingtonshire; 1831 – 1835	Succeeded by Robert Ferguson
