= Catholic Union =

Former Irish political party

- Leader: Archbishop Paul Cullen
- Founder: Archbishop Paul Cullen
- Founded: 26 November 1872; 153 years ago
- Dissolved: 1876; 150 years ago
- Preceded by: National Association
- Ideology: Irish nationalism Religious conservatism Land reform
- Religion: Roman Catholicism

The Catholic Union was a political organisation in Ireland in the 1870s. It was the brainchild of Paul Cullen, Roman Catholic Archbishop of Dublin and future Irish cardinal. He created it in 1872 to link growing public interest in politics and Irish nationalism with a Catholic agenda. It was his second attempt to create a Church-orientated political party, following the collapse and failure of his first such organisation, the National Association.

== Policy aims ==
The Catholic Union set itself three goals to achieve:

1. disestablishment of the Church of Ireland;
2. the creation of a Catholic university;
3. moderate land reform in Ireland.

== History ==
The Catholic Union failed as an organisation, however. It was overshadowed by a number of other organisations; from the Irish Republican Brotherhood and Isaac Butt's Home Government Association, a precursor of his later Home Rule League, to the Liberal and Conservative parties. The diminutive power of the Catholic Union was shown in the 1874 general election. Whereas the Conservatives won 32 seats, the Liberal Party 12 (down from 65) and the Home Rule League 59, the Union won nothing, with a supporter on Dublin Corporation unable even to get a seconder for his motion on home rule.

Though all three aims of the Catholic Union were achieved, they were achieved through the actions of others. The Catholic Union's irrelevance was shown when the Catholic Bishops went behind its own back to negotiate with Liberal Prime Minister William Ewart Gladstone on the education issue.

The Catholic Union rapidly disintegrated, with members drifting away within a short time of its foundation.

The organisation disappeared completely in the late 1870s. Its failure, along with the failure of Catholic Church-created or supported parties and candidates, notably the disastrous failure of the Bishop of Kerry's candidate in the 1872 County Kerry by-election (who was defeated when Kerry Catholics voted for a Protestant Home Ruler despite condemnation from the bishop), and the collapse in the campaign of one of Cullen's supporters in County Meath in the 1874 general election (where the candidate was forced to humiliatingly pull out through lack of support), indicated the limits on the political influence of the Roman Catholic Church in late 19th-century Ireland.

== Sources ==
- Joe Lee, The Modernisation of Irish Society (Gill History of Ireland Series 10, Gill and Macmillan, 1973)
