= Valentine Browne, 5th Earl of Kenmare =

Irish peer and landowner (1860–1941)

The Right Honourable The Earl of Kenmare CVO
- Photograph of Lord Kenmare, by Walter Stoneman, 1920

Lord Lieutenant of Kerry
- In office 1905–1922
- Preceded by: The Earl of Kenmare
- Succeeded by: Office abolished

Personal details
- Born: Valentine Charles Browne; 1 December 1860
- Died: 14 November 1941 (aged 80)
- Spouse: Hon. Elizabeth Baring (m. 1887, died)

Valentine Charles Browne, 5th Earl of Kenmare CVO (1 December 1860 – 14 November 1941), styled Viscount Castlerosse from 1871 to 1905, was an Irish peer who served in the Senate of Southern Ireland in 1921, and was Lord Lieutenant of Kerry.

== Early life ==
He was the son of Valentine Browne, 4th Earl of Kenmare and Gertrude Thynne. His elder sister, Lady Margaret Theodora May Catherine Browne, married Greville Charles Douglas, and his younger brother, Hon. Cecil Augustine Browne, died unmarried. Neither of his siblings had children.

His paternal grandparents were Thomas Browne, 3rd Earl of Kenmare and Catherine O'Callaghan (a daughter of Edmond O'Callaghan). His maternal grandparents were the Rev. Lord Charles Thynne, Canon of Canterbury (a son of the 2nd Marquess of Bath), and Harriet Frances Bagot (a daughter of Rt. Rev. Hon. Richard Bagot).

== Career ==
Lord Castlerosse was a lieutenant of 4th (Militia) Battalion, Worcestershire and Sherwood Foresters. He was appointed Master of the Horse to the Lord Lieutenant of Ireland (a position in the Viceregal household) in January 1903, and served as such until his succession as Earl of Kenmare in 1905.

As Earl of Kenmare he was a peer of the realm and though he was a Roman Catholic, he was also a unionist, which was uncommon at the time for Roman Catholics. He sat in the House of Lords as a member of the Irish Unionist Alliance. He also was a member of the Senate of Southern Ireland in 1921, but did not attend.

Lord Kenmare took an active part in the military. He was lieutenant-colonel in command of the 4th (Militia) Battalion of the Royal Munster Fusiliers (previously the Kerry Militia) from 1896 to December 1902, when he retired and took over from his father as Honorary Colonel of the regiment. He was also a colonel of the King's Regiment (Liverpool).

== Personal life ==
On 26 April 1887, he married Hon. Elizabeth Baring, the eldest daughter of Edward Baring, 1st Baron Revelstoke and Louisa Emily Charlotte Bulteel (a daughter of John Crocker Bulteel, MP, and granddaughter of the 2nd Earl Grey). Together, they were the parents of:

- Lady Dorothy Margaret Browne (1888–1961), who married Lord Edward Arthur Grosvenor, youngest son of Hugh Grosvenor, 1st Duke of Westminster and Hon. Katherine Caroline Cavendish (a daughter of the 2nd Baron Chesham), in 1914. After his death in 1929, she married Hon. Sir Evan Edward Charteris, son of Francis Charteris, 10th Earl of Wemyss and Lady Anne Frederica Anson (a daughter of the 1st Earl of Lichfield), in 1930.
- Lady Cecilia Kathleen Browne (b. 1888), who married Col. Hon. Thomas Eustace Vesey, son of Capt. Hon. Eustace Vesey (son of Lt.-Col. 3rd Viscount de Vesci) and Hon. Constance Mary Lawley (a daughter of the 2nd Baron Wenlock), in 1911.
- Valentine Edward Charles Browne, 6th Earl of Kenmare (1891–1943), who married Jessie "Doris" Delevingne, eldest child of Edward Charles Delevingne, and Jessie Marion Homan, in 1928. They divorced in 1938, and he married Enid Maude, Viscountess Furness, widow of Marmaduke Furness, 1st Viscount Furness, and daughter of Charles Lindeman.
- Hon. Maurice Henry Dermot Browne (1894–1915), a Lt. in the Coldstream Guards who was killed in action during World War I.
- Gerald Ralph Desmond Browne, 7th Earl of Kenmare (1896–1952), who died unmarried.

On his death in 1941 aged 80, he was buried in the family vault in Killarney Cathedral. He was succeeded by his eldest son, Valentine.

== Book link ==
- Hesilrige, Arthur G. M. (1921). Debrett's Peerage and Titles of courtesy. London, UK: Dean & Son. p. 510.

Honorary titles
Preceded by The Earl of Kenmare	Lord Lieutenant of Kerry; 1905–1922	Office abolished
Peerage of Ireland
Preceded by Valentine Browne	Earl of Kenmare; 1905–1941	Succeeded by Valentine Browne
