= County Kerry (UK Parliament constituency) =

Former parliamentary constituency in the United Kingdom

- Former county constituency for the House of Commons
- County: County Kerry

1801–1885
- Seats: 2
- Created from: County Kerry (IHC)
- Replaced by: East Kerry; North Kerry; South Kerry; West Kerry

County Kerry was a UK Parliament constituency in Ireland, returning two Members of Parliament. In 1885, it was divided into four constituencies.

== History ==
County Kerry had been represented by two seats in the Irish House of Commons. From 1801, under the Acts of Union 1800, it was represented by two MPs in the United Kingdom House of Commons. It comprised the whole of County Kerry, except for the borough of Tralee. The boroughs of Ardfert and Dingle were disfranchised in 1801.

Under the Redistribution of Seats Act 1885, Tralee lost its separate franchise and the county was divided into four divisions: East Kerry, North Kerry, South Kerry and West Kerry.

== Members of Parliament ==
Year	1st Member	1st Party	2nd Member	2nd Party
1801	James Crosbie		Maurice Fitzgerald	Whig
1806	Henry Arthur Herbert (1756–1821)		Maurice Fitzgerald	Whig
1812	James Crosbie		Maurice Fitzgerald	Whig
1826	William Hare (Viscount Ennismore from 1827)	Whig	Maurice Fitzgerald	Whig
1830	William Browne	Whig	Maurice Fitzgerald	Tory
1831	Frederick Mullins	Repeal Association	Daniel O'Connell	Repeal Association
1832	Frederick Mullins	Repeal Association	Charles O'Connell	Repeal Association
1835	Frederick Mullins	Repeal Association	Morgan John O'Connell	Repeal Association
1837	Arthur Blennerhassett	Conservative	Morgan John O'Connell	Repeal Association
1841	William Browne	Whig	Morgan John O'Connell	Repeal Association
1847	Henry Arthur Herbert (1815–66)	Peelite	Morgan John O'Connell	Repeal Association
1852	Henry Arthur Herbert (1815–66)	Peelite	Valentine Browne (Viscount Castlerosse from 1853)	Whig
1859	Henry Arthur Herbert (1815–66)	Liberal	Valentine Browne (Viscount Castlerosse from 1853)	Liberal
1866 by-election	Henry Arthur Herbert (1840–1901)	Liberal	Valentine Browne (Viscount Castlerosse from 1853)	Liberal
1872 by-election	Henry Arthur Herbert (1840–1901)	Liberal	Rowland Blennerhassett	Home Rule League
1880	Sir Rowland Blennerhassett, 4th Bt	Liberal Party	Rowland Blennerhassett	Home Rule League

== Elections ==
=== Elections in the 1830s ===
FitzGerald was appointed as Vice-Treasurer of Ireland, causing a by-election.

By-election, 20 April 1830: Kerry
Party	Candidate	Votes	%	±%
Tory	Maurice FitzGerald	Unopposed		
Tory gain from Whig				

General election 1830: Kerry
Party	Candidate	Votes	%	±%
Whig	William Browne	390	36.1	
Tory	Maurice FitzGerald	377	34.9	
Tory	Pierce Crosbie	217	20.1	
Tory	John Bateman (Tralee MP)	96	8.9	
Turnout		543	53.0	
Registered electors		1,024		
Majority		13	1.2	
Whig hold		Swing		
Majority		160	14.8	
Tory gain from Whig		Swing		

General election 1831: Kerry
Party	Candidate	Votes	%
Repeal	Daniel O'Connell	Unopposed	
Repeal	Frederick Mullins	Unopposed	
Registered electors		936	
Repeal gain from Tory			
Repeal gain from Whig			

General election 1832: Kerry
Party	Candidate	Votes	%
Repeal	Charles O'Connell	Unopposed	
Repeal	Frederick Mullins	Unopposed	
Registered electors		1,161	
Repeal hold			
Repeal hold			

General election 1835: Kerry
Party	Candidate	Votes	%
Repeal (Whig)	Morgan O'Connell	818	44.0
Repeal (Whig)	Frederick Mullins	596	32.0
Conservative	Maurice FitzGerald	384	20.6
Whig	Thomas Ponsonby	63	3.4
Majority		212	11.4
Turnout		1,002	82.7
Registered electors		1,212	
Repeal hold			
Repeal hold			

General election 1837: Kerry
Party	Candidate	Votes	%	±%
Repeal (Whig)	Morgan O'Connell	697	37.6	−6.4
Conservative	Arthur Blennerhassett	546	29.5	+8.9
Repeal (Whig)	Frederick Mullins	498	26.9	−5.1
Conservative	Samuel Murray Hickson	112	6.0	New
Turnout		921	60.9	−21.8
Registered electors		1,512		
Majority		151	8.1	−3.3
Repeal hold		Swing	−6.9	
Majority		48	2.6	N/A
Conservative gain from Repeal		Swing	+12.5	

=== Elections in the 1840s ===
General election 1841: Kerry
Party	Candidate	Votes	%	±%
Whig	William Browne	751	37.4	N/A
Repeal	Morgan O'Connell	744	37.1	−27.4
Conservative	Arthur Blennerhassett	445	22.2	−7.3
Conservative	John Hickson Mahony	67	3.3	−2.7
Turnout		1,219	80.0	+19.1
Registered electors		1,523		
Majority		306	15.2	N/A
Whig gain from Conservative		Swing		
Majority		299	14.9	+6.8
Repeal hold		Swing	−8.5	

General election 1847: Kerry
Party	Candidate	Votes	%	±%
Repeal	Morgan O'Connell	Unopposed		
Peelite	Henry Arthur Herbert (senior)	Unopposed		
Registered electors		1,840		
Repeal hold				
Peelite gain from Whig				

=== Elections in the 1850s ===
General election 1852: Kerry
Party	Candidate	Votes	%	±%
Whig	Valentine Browne	Unopposed		
Peelite	Henry Arthur Herbert (senior)	Unopposed		
Registered electors		5,222		
Whig gain from Repeal				
Peelite hold				

Browne was appointed Comptroller of the Household, requiring a by-election.

By-election, 9 August 1856: Kerry
Party	Candidate	Votes	%	±%
Whig	Valentine Browne	Unopposed		
Whig hold				

General election 1857: Kerry
Party	Candidate	Votes	%	±%
Whig	Valentine Browne	Unopposed		
Peelite	Henry Arthur Herbert (senior)	Unopposed		
Registered electors		5,427		
Whig hold				
Peelite hold				

Herbert was appointed Chief Secretary for Ireland, requiring a by-election.

By-election, 9 June 1857: Kerry
Party	Candidate	Votes	%	±%
Peelite	Henry Arthur Herbert (senior)	Unopposed		
Registered electors		5,427		
Peelite hold				

General election 1859: Kerry
Party	Candidate	Votes	%	±%
Liberal	Valentine Browne	Unopposed		
Liberal	Henry Arthur Herbert (senior)	Unopposed		
Registered electors		5,278		
Liberal hold				
Liberal hold				

Browne was appointed Treasurer of the Household, requiring a by-election.

By-election, 5 July 1859: Kerry
Party	Candidate	Votes	%	±%
Liberal	Valentine Browne	Unopposed		
Registered electors		5,278		
Liberal hold				

=== Elections in the 1860s ===
General election 1865: Kerry
Party	Candidate	Votes	%	±%
Liberal	Valentine Browne	Unopposed		
Liberal	Henry Arthur Herbert (senior)	Unopposed		
Registered electors		5,415		
Liberal hold				
Liberal hold				

Herbert's death caused a by-election.

By-election, 16 March 1866: Kerry
Party	Candidate	Votes	%	±%
Liberal	Henry Arthur Herbert (junior)	Unopposed		
Registered electors		5,415		
Liberal hold				

General election 1868: Kerry
Party	Candidate	Votes	%	±%
Liberal	Valentine Browne	Unopposed		
Liberal	Henry Arthur Herbert (junior)	Unopposed		
Registered electors		5,506		
Liberal hold				
Liberal hold				

Browne was appointed Vice-Chamberlain of the Household, requiring a by-election.

By-election, 7 January 1869: Kerry
Party	Candidate	Votes	%	±%
Liberal	Valentine Browne	Unopposed		
Registered electors		5,506		
Liberal hold				

=== Elections in the 1870s ===
Browne succeeded as Earl of Kenmare, causing a by-election.

By-election, 6 Feb 1872: Kerry
Party	Candidate	Votes	%	±%
Home Rule	Rowland Ponsonby Blennerhassett	2,237	61.5	New
Liberal	James Arthur Dease	1,398	38.5	N/A
Majority		839	23.0	N/A
Turnout		3,635	66.7	N/A
Registered electors		5,450		
Home Rule gain from Liberal				

General election 1874: Kerry
Party	Candidate	Votes	%	±%
Home Rule	Rowland Ponsonby Blennerhassett	Unopposed		
Liberal	Henry Arthur Herbert (junior)	Unopposed		
Registered electors		5,484		
Home Rule gain from Liberal				
Liberal hold				

=== Elections in the 1880s ===
General election 1880: Kerry
Party	Candidate	Votes	%	±%
Home Rule	Rowland Ponsonby Blennerhassett	Unopposed		
Liberal	Rowland Blennerhassett	Unopposed		
Registered electors		5,326		
Home Rule hold				
Liberal hold				
