= Henry Arthur Herbert (1840–1901) =

Irish politician

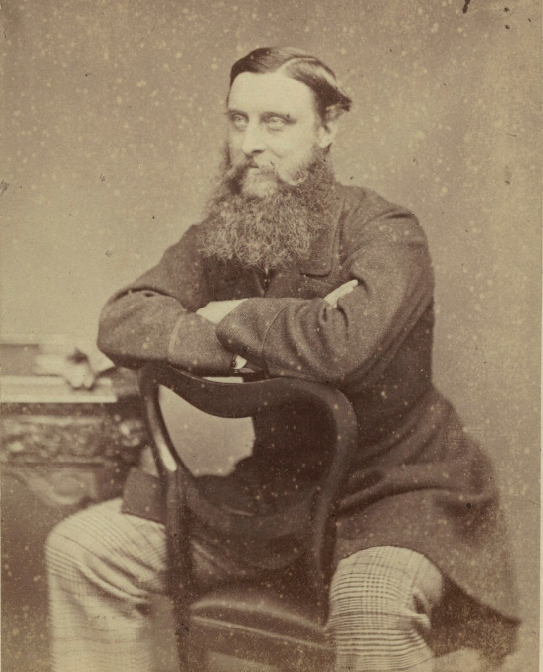
Herbert in the 1870s

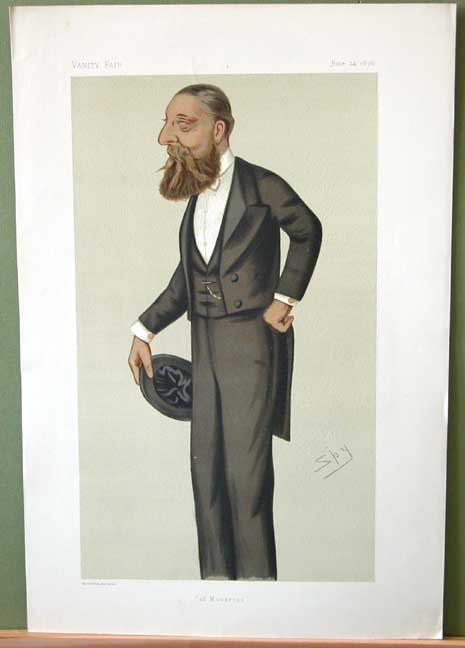
"of Muckross". Caricature by Spy published in Vanity Fair in 1876.

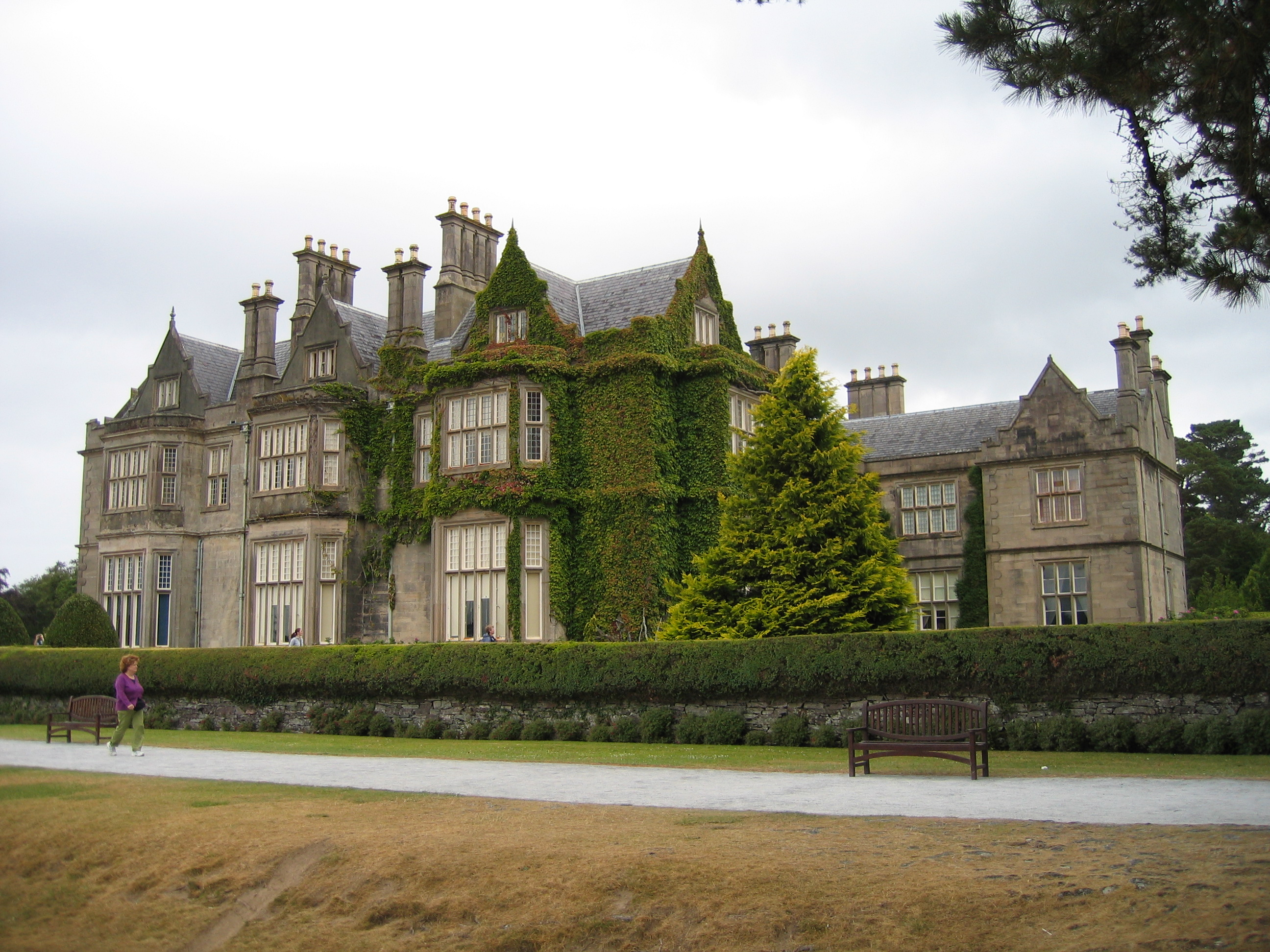
Muckross House

Major Henry Arthur Herbert (1840 – 14 August 1901) was an Irish landowner and a politician in the Parliament of the United Kingdom.

== Background ==
He was the son of Henry Arthur Herbert (1815–1866), and his wife the Scottish watercolourist Mary Balfour Herbert. His great-grandfather was Henry Arthur Herbert (1756–1821), MP for Kerry from 1806 to 1813.

Henry's great-grandmother, Anne, was the daughter of a 'Jamaican of colour' called Elizabeth Augier.

He inherited his father's Muckross House and estate, near Killarney. In the 1870s this estate amounted to over 47,000 acres in County Kerry. Under Henry Arthur Herbert's reign the fortunes of the Muckross estate declined until it became insolvent in 1897. A year later, the estate was forfeited to the Standard Life Assurance Company and the long association of the Herbert family with Muckross House was ended.

After the auction of the property in November 1899 had failed, it was bought a week later by Arthur Guinness, Baron Ardilaun.

He is buried in the Killegy graveyard near Muckross House.

== Public career ==
Henry Arthur Herbert was a JP and Deputy Lieutenant for Kerry.

He sat in Parliament as Member of Parliament (MP) for County Kerry from 1866 until 1880. He was appointed High Sheriff of Kerry in 1881.

He was a major in the London Irish Rifles and a captain in the Coldstream Guards.

== Family ==
Shortly after his father's death, Henry Arthur Herbert married the Hon. Emily Julia Charlotte Keane (*12 Jan 1848, †2 Jul 1911) from County Waterford, the daughter of Edward Arthur Wellington Keane, 2nd Baron Keane, and Louisa Caroline Lydia Benyon. He petitioned for divorce (The Times, 29 April 1882) on the grounds of his wife's adultery with Charles B. Greenfield, and the couple were divorced in the early 1880s. They had three children, Henry Arthur Edward Keane Herbert (1867–1931), Kathleen Mary Eleanor Herbert (1868–1956) and Gladys Blanche Herbert (1873-). Emily married as her second husband Henry Hutton Vignoles (1861–1931) in 1897.

Parliament of the United Kingdom
Preceded by Henry Arthur Herbert (father); Valentine Browne	Member of Parliament for County Kerry; 1866 – 1880; With: Valentine Browne 1866–1871; Rowland Ponsonby Blennerhassett 1872–1880	Succeeded by Rowland Ponsonby Blennerhassett; Sir Rowland Blennerhassett
