= 1872 County Kerry by-election =

UK Parliamentary by-election

The 1872 County Kerry by-election was fought on 6 February 1872. The by-election was held due to the incumbent Liberal MP Valentine Browne succeeding to the peerage as Earl of Kenmare. It was won by the Home Rule candidate Rowland Blennerhassett. The by-election was important in the decline of the Catholic Union whose candidate was defeated by Blennerhassett, who although a Home Ruler was a Protestant. The Bishop of Kerry had condemned the Home Rule campaign.

== Result ==
Election	Political result	Candidate	Party	Votes	%	±%
1871 County Kerry by-election Succession to peerage by Viscount Castlerosse; Electorate: 5,450; Turnout: 3,635 (66.7%) N/A	Home Rule gain from Liberal; Majority: 839 (23.0%)	Rowland Blennerhassett	Home Rule	2,237	61.5	New
1871 County Kerry by-election Succession to peerage by Viscount Castlerosse; Electorate: 5,450; Turnout: 3,635 (66.7%) N/A	Home Rule gain from Liberal; Majority: 839 (23.0%)	J. A. Dease	Liberal	1,398	38.5	N/A
