= Henry Arthur Herbert (1756–1821) =

Major landowner in Ireland (1756-1821)

Henry Arthur Herbert the elder (c. 1756 – 21 June 1821, Westminster) was a major landowner in County Kerry, Ireland, and a member of the Parliament of the United Kingdom. He was educated at St John's College, Cambridge and studied law at the Middle Temple.

Henry Arthur was the son of Thomas Herbert, who had amassed a fortune by exploiting the copper mines of the Muckross Peninsula and Ross Island areas of the Lakes of Killarney in Kerry. The Herbert family had originally come from Montgomeryshire in Wales in the 17th century. In 1770 the Herberts “inherited” the large estates of the MacCarthy family in the Killarney area.

He was Member of the Parliament of the United Kingdom for County Kerry and Tralee in Ireland between 1806 and 1813. He commenced the building of Muckross House on his estate in Killarney.

He died in Westminster in 1821. He had married Elizabeth, daughter of George Germain, 1st Viscount Sackville. They had a son, Charles John.

He should not be confused with his grandson, also Henry Arthur Herbert (the younger), who married Mary Balfour Herbert with whom he built the present Muckross House. Henry Jnr became Chief Secretary for Ireland from 1857 to 1858 and hosted Queen Victoria on her visit to his estate at Muckross in 1861.

Parliament of Great Britain
Preceded by John Irwin; George Germain	Member of Parliament for East Grinstead; 1782–1786; With: John Irwin 1782–1783; George Medley 1783–1790	Succeeded by John Irwin; James Cuninghame
Parliament of the United Kingdom
Preceded by James Crosbie; Maurice FitzGerald	Member of Parliament for County Kerry; 1806–1812; With: Maurice FitzGerald	Succeeded by James Crosbie; Maurice FitzGerald
Preceded by James Stephen	Member of Parliament for Tralee; 1812–1813	Succeeded by James Evan Baillie
