= 1874 United Kingdom general election in Ireland =

- 31 January – 17 February 1874

103 of the 652 seats to the House of Commons (Note: Sligo and Cashel had been disenfranchised by the Sligo and Cashel Disfranchisement Act 1870, so there was a reduction in two seats from Ireland.)
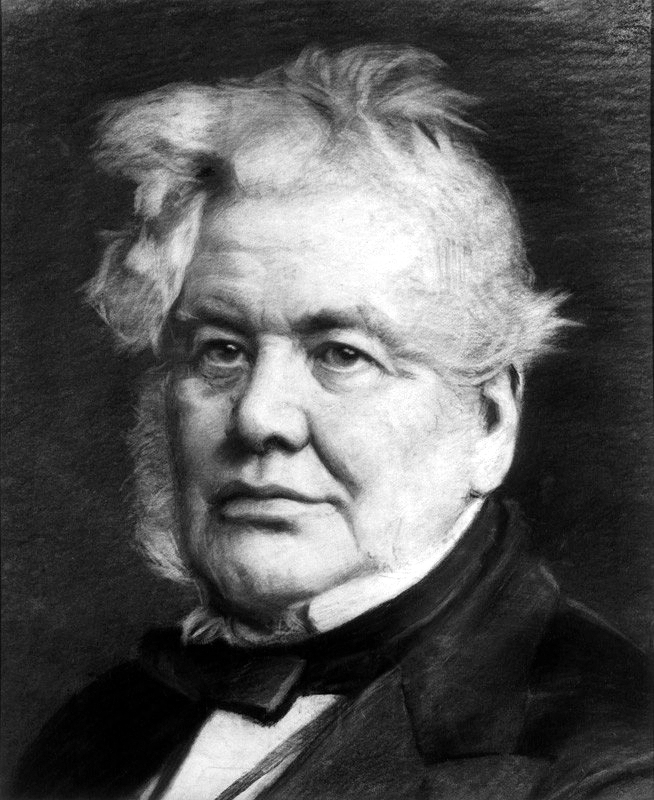

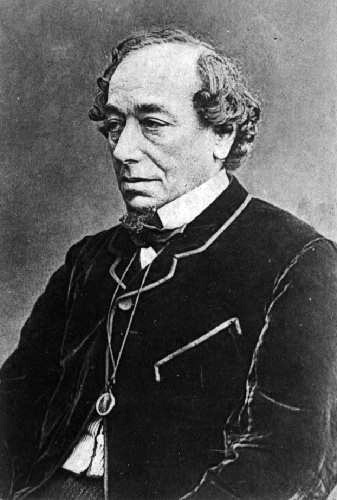

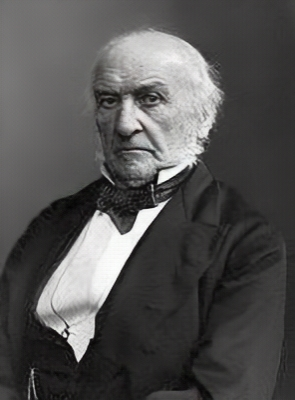
	First party	Second party	Third party
Leader	Isaac Butt	Benjamin Disraeli	William Ewart Gladstone
Party	Home Rule	Conservative	Liberal
Leader since	1873	27 February 1868	3 December 1868
Leader's seat	Limerick	Buckinghamshire	Greenwich
Last election	New	39	66
Seats won	60	33	10
Seat change	▲60	▼6	▼56
Popular vote	90,234	91,702	39,778
Percentage	39.6%	40.8%	18.4%
Swing	▲39.6%	▼1.1%	▼39.5%
- Results of the 1874 election in Ireland

The 1874 United Kingdom general election in Ireland produced the first major electoral appearance of the Home Rule League under chairman Isaac Butt. The party's electoral success, in which it won 60 MPs, taking control of Irish electoral politics from the previously dominant Conservative and the Liberal parties was, the beginning of a dominance that was to see the party as the Irish Parliamentary Party control the political landscape in Ireland until its wipeout in the 1918 general election.

However its success in 1874 was marred by the lack of unity within the party in the House of Commons, where many of its members in effect sat as Liberal MPs and voted against their own Irish colleagues. It was not until then chairman Charles Stewart Parnell in the early 1880s introduced a strict whip that the party began to exercise serious influence, and act as a unit, at Westminster.

== Results ==
Party	Seats	Seats change	Votes	%	% Change
Home Rule	60	New	90,234	39.6	▲39.6
Irish Conservative	33	▼6	91,702	40.8	▼1.1
Liberal	10	▼56	39,778	18.4	▼39.5
Other (Incl. the Catholic Union)	0	—	2,934	1.2	▲1.0
Total	103	▼2	224,648	100.0	

Popular vote
Irish Conservative	40.82%
Home Rule	40.17%
Liberal	17.71%
Others	1.31%

Parliamentary seats
Home Rule	58.35%
Irish Conservative	31.42%
Liberal	9.71%

== See also ==
- History of Ireland (1801–1923)

== Sources ==
- Craig, F. W. S. (ed.). British Electoral Facts: 1832–1987.
