= Valentine Browne, 2nd Earl of Kenmare =

Irish peer and landowner

Valentine Browne, 2nd Earl of Kenmare PC (I) (15 January 1788 – 31 October 1853), styled Viscount Castlerosse from 1801 to 1812, was Earl of Kenmare and Lord Lieutenant of Kerry. He succeeded Valentine Browne, 1st Earl of Kenmare.

In 1831, he was appointed Lord Lieutenant of Kerry and was made a member of the Privy Council of Ireland in 1834.

Honorary titles
| New office | Lord Lieutenant of Kerry; 1831–1853 | Succeeded by Henry Herbert |
Peerage of Ireland
| Preceded by Valentine Browne | Earl of Kenmare; 1812–1853 | Succeeded by Thomas Browne |
Peerage of the United Kingdom
| New creation | Baron Kenmare; 1841–1853 | Extinct |
