= Morgan John O'Connell =

Irish Repeal Association politician

Morgan O'Connell (27 August 1811 – 2 July 1875) was an Irish Repeal Association politician who was Member of Parliament (MP) for County Kerry from the 1835 election until the 1852 election. His father was John O'Connell, younger brother of Daniel O'Connell, the leader of the Repeal Association. John's son was usually called Morgan John O'Connell to distinguish him from Daniel's son Morgan O'Connell, such a patronymic being a common Irish practice. His mother Elizabeth Coppinger was descended from Sir Walter Coppinger. He was "wild and extravagant" in his youth, and in middle age financial necessity made him practice at the English bar. His uncle William Coppinger died in 1862; O'Connell inherited an estate in County Cork directly and another in Kildysart, County Clare, after his mother died the next year. In 1865 he married Mary Anne Bianconi, daughter of entrepreneur Charles Bianconi; she remembered him as "a very handsome, tall, stout, jolly, fresh-looking man". Their only child, John O'Connell Bianconi, was a reforming landlord, and in 1914 the County Clare commander of the National Volunteers.

Parliament of the United Kingdom
Preceded by Charles O'Connell; Frederick Mullins	Member of Parliament for County Kerry; 1835 – 1852; With: Frederick Mullins 1835–1837; Arthur Blennerhassett 1837–1841; William Browne 1841–1847; Henry Arthur Herbert 1847–1852	Succeeded by Valentine Browne; Henry Arthur Herbert
