= Mary Balfour Herbert =

Irish artist

- Born: Mary Balfour; 1817
- Died: 1893 (aged 75–76); London, United Kingdom
- Known for: Painting
- Spouse: Henry Arthur Herbert (m. 1837; died 1866)
- Children: 4, including Henry Arthur Herbert
- Father: James Balfour

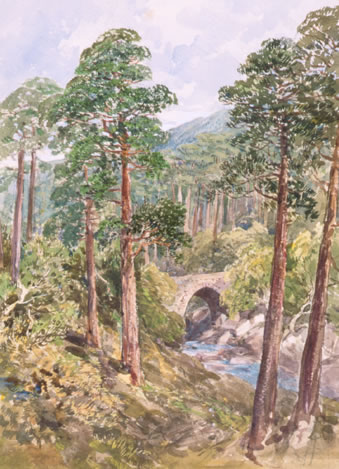
Torc Bridge By Mary Balfour Herbert (1860)

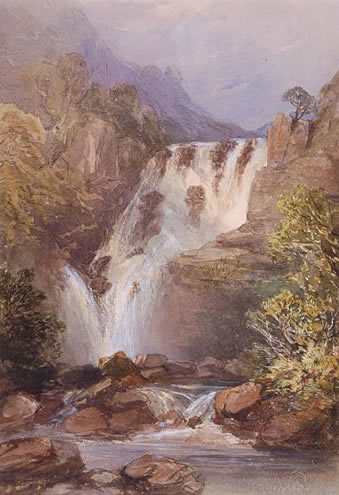
Torc Waterfall By Mary Balfour Herbert (1860)

Mary Balfour Herbert (1817–1893) was a British artist. She was born Mary Balfour in 1817, the daughter of James Balfour MP and Lady Eleanor Maitland; they were grandparents of Arthur Balfour 1st Earl Balfour. She grew up in Whittingehame House, East Lothian, Scotland, and travelled widely during her childhood. She took drawing lessons but had no other formal art education.

She met Henry Arthur Herbert while abroad in Rome and married him in September 1837. His family owned the Muckross Estate near Killarney in County Kerry, Ireland, and they moved there to Torc Cottage after their wedding. She loved the Muckross estate as it had always reminded her of her childhood home in Scotland. She brought a large dowry to the marriage, of £40,000 (equivalent to £3.87 million in 2025). The couple were then able to start construction of a large house in 1839, which was finished in 1843, shortly before the Great Famine.

The couple had four children, all born abroad between 1839 and 1846. They were Eleanor, Henry Arthur, Charles, and Blanche. Mary put much effort into raising funds for the famine-stricken inhabitants of the estate, but she lived away from the estate, in England.

She also worked at developing her talents as a watercolour artist, and she displayed considerable skill with practice. She painted many scenes from the Lakes of Killarney and was recognised as the "...most gifted amateur in the kingdom." (The Times, Friday 30 August 1861). Queen Victoria visited the estate with the royal family in 1861 and received several of Mary's paintings as a parting gift.

Henry died in 1866 and was interred in the family vault at Killegy graveyard near Muckross House, and Mary then moved back to England with her two daughters. She was able to rekindle many of her old friendships with people notable in art at the time, including Edward Burne-Jones who was a close friend of the well-known artist William Morris.

After her oldest daughter Eleanor's marriage in 1871, Mary moved to Bellagio, Italy, near Lake Como and continued her artwork there. She died in London in 1893 and was buried with her husband in Killegy graveyard. The house has subsequently become a museum, and the estate is now Killarney National Park.
