= George Germain, 1st Viscount Sackville =

British Army officer and politician (1716–1785)

Major-General The Right Honourable The Viscount Sackville PC
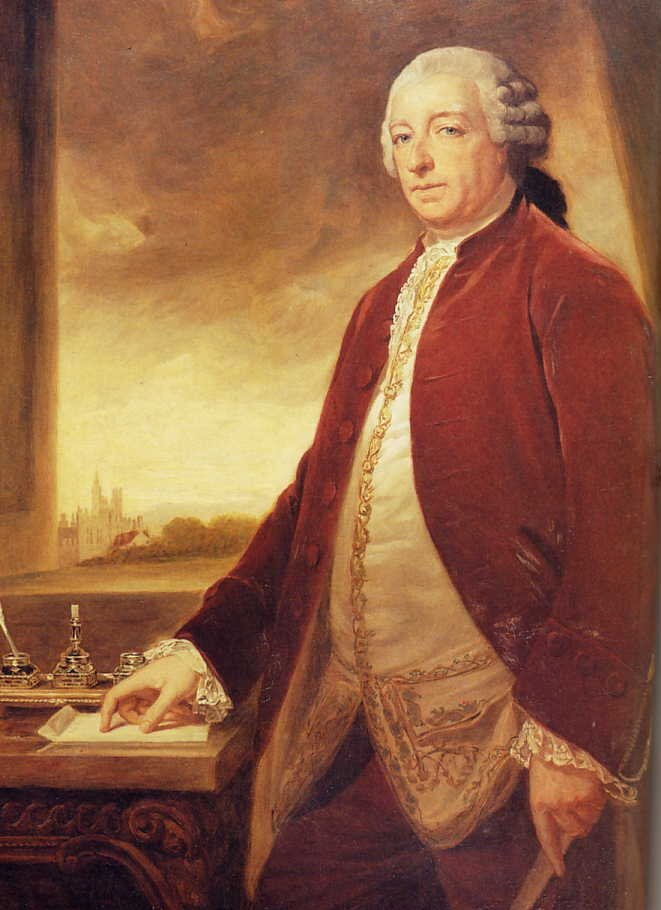
- Portrait by George Romney, 1778

Secretary of State for the Colonies
- In office 10 November 1775 – February 1782
- Monarch: George III
- Prime Minister: Lord North
- Preceded by: The Earl of Dartmouth
- Succeeded by: Welbore Ellis

First Lord of Trade
- In office 10 November 1775 – 6 November 1779
- Monarch: George III
- Prime Minister: Lord North
- Preceded by: The Earl of Dartmouth
- Succeeded by: The Earl of Carlisle

Member of Parliament for East Grinstead
- In office 1767–1782
- Preceded by: Joseph Yorke; Sir Whistler Webster
- Succeeded by: Charles Sackville, Earl of Middlesex; Sir Thomas Hales, 3rd Baronet

Personal details
- Born: George Sackville; 26 January 1716
- Died: 26 August 1785 (aged 69) Stoneland Lodge, Sussex, England
- Party: Tory (Northite)
- Spouse: Diana Sambrooke (m. 1754; died 1778)
- Children: 5, including Charles
- Parent(s): Lionel Sackville, 1st Duke of Dorset; Elizabeth Colyear
- Education: Trinity College, Dublin

Major-General George Germain, 1st Viscount Sackville, PC (born George Sackville; 26 January 1716 – 26 August 1785) was a British Army officer and politician who served as Secretary of State for the Colonies from 1775 to 1782. Serving in the North ministry during the American War of Independence, he was a hardliner, "the chief architect of the American War in Britain," receiving significant blame for Britain's defeat.

Germain's war policy was based on his mistaken belief that loyalty to the crown was widespread and would prevail with military support. His issuance of confusing instructions to British commanders in North America, coupled with his failure to understand either the geography of Britain's American colonies or the determination of the rebels' resolve, have led many historians to support such arguments.

He served in the British army in the War of the Austrian Succession and in the European theater of Seven Years' War. In the decisive Battle of Minden, his lack of vigorous action was considered a disgrace. He called for a court-martial to clear his name, but the court decided against him. His military career ended, but after a period he was elected to Parliament and gained prominence politically in the ministry of Lord North. His career ended with the fall of the North ministry in March 1782, when Parliament no longer supported the American war.

== Early life and education ==
He was born George Sackville, the third son of Lionel Sackville, 1st Duke of Dorset, and his wife Elizabeth, daughter of Lieutenant-General Walter Philip Colyear. His godfather George I attended his baptism.

As an adult, Sackville legally changed his name in 1770 to "George Germain" by which he is generally known in the historical literature.

He was educated at Westminster School in London and graduated from Trinity College in Dublin in 1737. Between 1730 and 1737 and again from 1750 to 1755, his father held the post of Lord Lieutenant of Ireland. While in Dublin, Sackville befriended the celebrated writer Jonathan Swift. He also encountered Lord Ligonier, who would subsequently assist his career in the military.

He then entered the army, where he was elected Grandmaster of the Grand Lodge of Ireland in 1751 and served for two years.

== Family ==
Sackville married Diana Sambrooke, daughter of John Sambrooke and Elizabeth Forester, on 3 September 1754. They had two sons and two daughters, including:

- Diana Sackville (8 July 1756 – 29 August 1814), married John Crosbie, 2nd Earl of Glandore
- Charles Sackville (27 August 1767 – 29 July 1843), later changed his name to Charles Sackville-Germain.
- George Sackville (7 December 1770 – 31 May 1836)
- Elizabeth, married Henry Herbert, MP

He was known to be gay.

== Early military career ==
Germain started as a captain in the 7th Horse (later the 6th Dragoon Guards). In 1740, he transferred to the Gloucestershire Regiment of Foot as a lieutenant colonel. The regiment was sent to Germany to participate in the War of the Austrian Succession. In 1743, he was promoted to brevet colonel.

=== Battle of Fontenoy ===
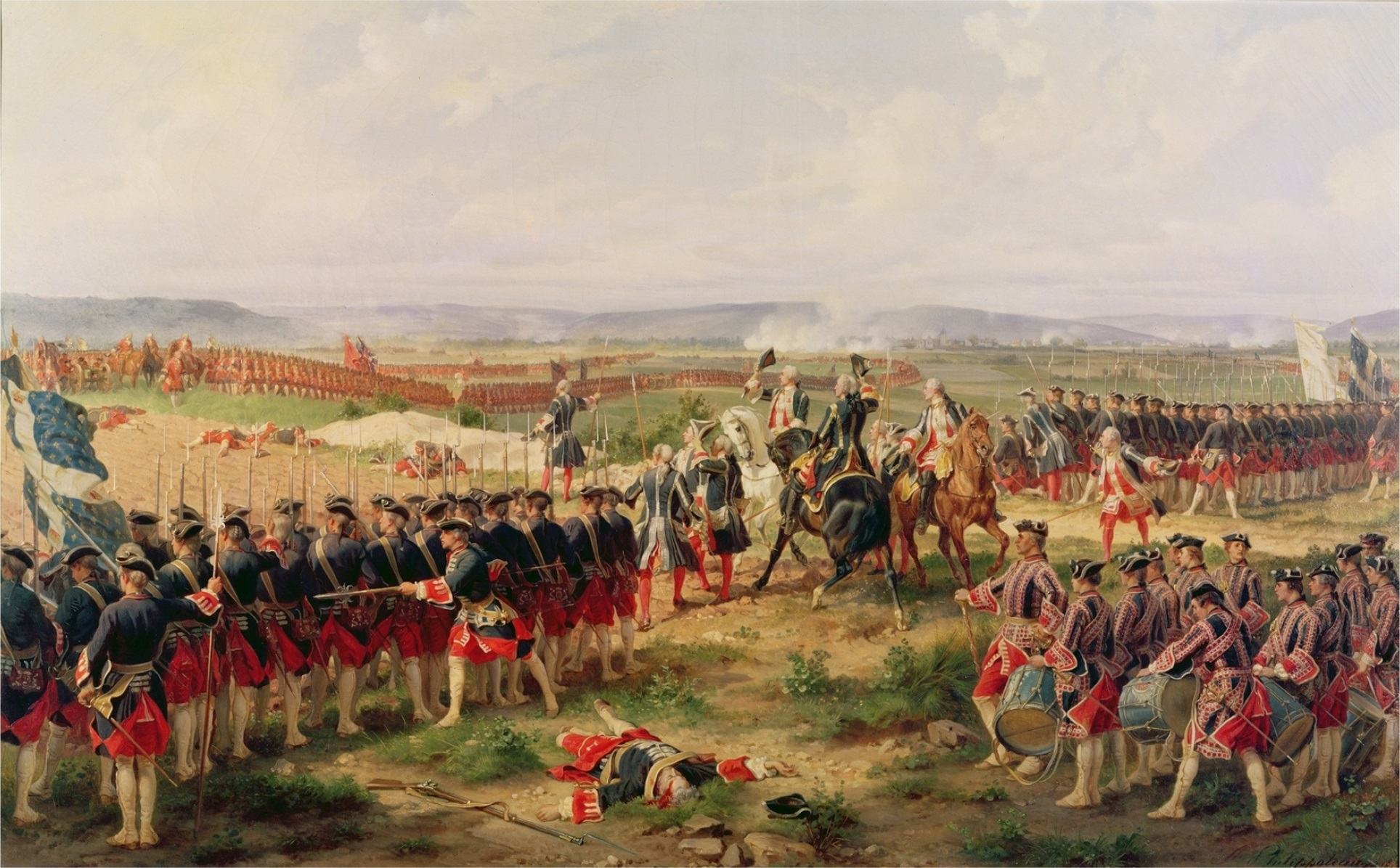
The Battle of Fontenoy in 1745 where Sackville first distinguished himself. He was wounded and captured by the French.

He saw his first battle, leading the charge of the Duke of Cumberland's infantry in the Battle of Fontenoy in 1745. He led his regiment so deep into the French lines that when he was wounded and captured he was taken to the tent of Louis XV. When he was released and returned home, it was to duty in Scotland as the Colonel of the 20th Foot Regiment. Sackville then saw service in the suppression of the Jacobite Highlanders following the Battle of Culloden. In 1747 and 1748, he again joined the Duke of Cumberland. He became colonel of the 7th Irish horse and served in Holland. There was a break in his military career between wars (1750–1755) when he served as first secretary to his father.

During the Seven Years' War, he returned to active military service. He had been considered for the post of Commander-in-Chief in North America, which eventually went to Edward Braddock, who led his force to disaster during the Braddock Campaign. In 1755, Sackville was promoted to major general and returned to active service to oversee ordnance. In 1758, he was given a fourth regiment and joined the Duke of Marlborough as a lieutenant general. The same year Sackville was wounded a second time fighting the French.

Sackville's combination of military achievement and social skills fueled the rise of his reputation at this point in his life. He was sworn of the Privy Council in January 1758.

=== Raid on St Malo ===
In June 1758 Sackville was second in command of a British expedition, led by Marlborough, which attempted an amphibious Raid on St Malo. While it failed to take the town as instructed, the raid was still considered to have been largely successful as a diversion. Follow-up raids were considered against Le Havre, Caen and other targets in Normandy, but no further landings were attempted, and the force returned home.

Later in 1758 they joined the allied forces of Duke Ferdinand of Brunswick in Germany, with the first detachment of British troops sent to the Continent. When Marlborough died, Sackville became Commander of the British contingent of the army, although still under the overall command of the Duke of Brunswick.

== Battle of Minden ==
In the Battle of Minden on 1 August 1759, British and Hanoverian infantry of the centre made an advance on the French cavalry and artillery in that sector. They apparently went in without orders and their attacking line formation even repulsed repeated French cavalry charges, holding until the last moment then firing a massive volley when the charge came within ten yards. As the disrupted French began to fall back on Minden, Ferdinand called for a British cavalry charge to complete the victory, but Sackville withheld permission for their advance. Ferdinand sent his order several times, but Sackville was estranged from Lord Granby, the force commander. He continued to withhold permission for Granby to "gain glory" through an attack. For that action, he was cashiered and sent home. Granby replaced him as commander of the British contingent for the remainder of the war.

=== Court martial ===
Sackville contested the allegation that he disobeyed orders. Back in England, he demanded a court martial, although he had not been charged, and he obtained his demand in 1760. Appearing before a military board of general officers Sackville based his defence on the pleas that his orders were vaguely expressed, that the ground over which his horsemen had to advance was rough and difficult, and that the delay in engagement was only a matter of minutes. The court found him guilty, and imposed one of the strangest and strongest verdicts ever rendered against a general officer. The court's verdict not only upheld his discharge but also ruled that he was "unfit to serve His Majesty in any military Capacity whatever". It then ordered the verdict be read to and entered in the orderly book of every regiment in the army. The King had his name struck from the Privy Council rolls.

== Early political career ==
=== Member of Parliament ===
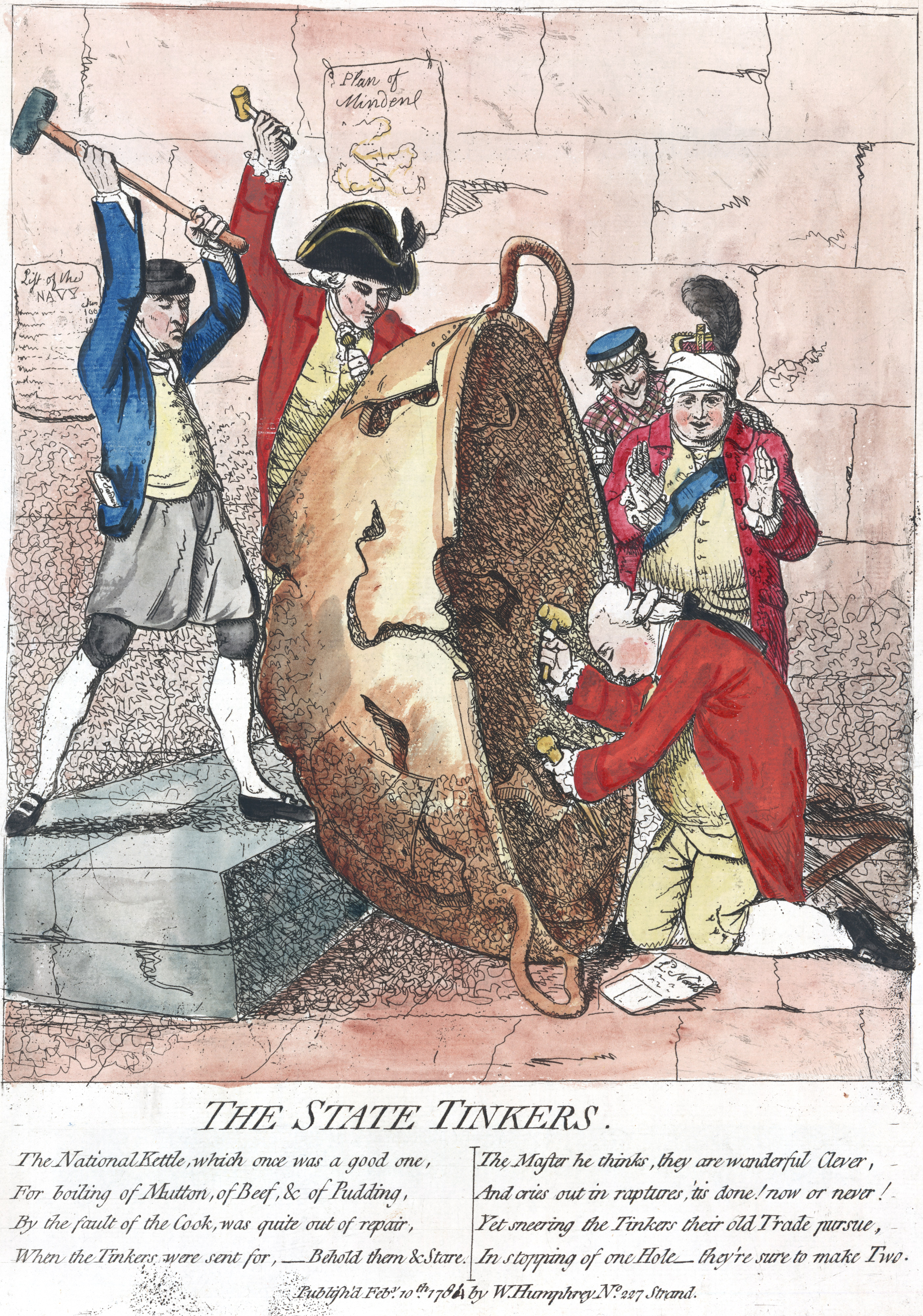
In The State Tinkers (1780), James Gillray caricatured Germain (second from left) and his political allies as incompetent tinkers of the National Kettle. Posted on the wall behind Germain is the "Plan of Minden".

Sackville had been a Member of Parliament at intervals since 1733. He had served terms in both the Dublin and the Westminster bodies, sometimes simultaneously, but had not taken sides in political wrangles. Leader of the House of Commons Robert Walpole commented that "nobody stood higher" than the young Sackville. Between 1750 and 1755 he served as Chief Secretary for Ireland, during his father's second term as Lord Lieutenant of Ireland.

When George III ascended to the British throne in 1760, Sackville began his political rehabilitation. There did not seem to be negative repercussions to the European stalemate of the Seven Years' War. The victories over the French within the colonial empire provided a chance for events of the war to be forgotten. The difficulty of repaying the debts incurred to fight the war caused a period of unstable ministries and shifting political alliances. In 1765, King George quietly returned him to the rolls of the Privy Council.

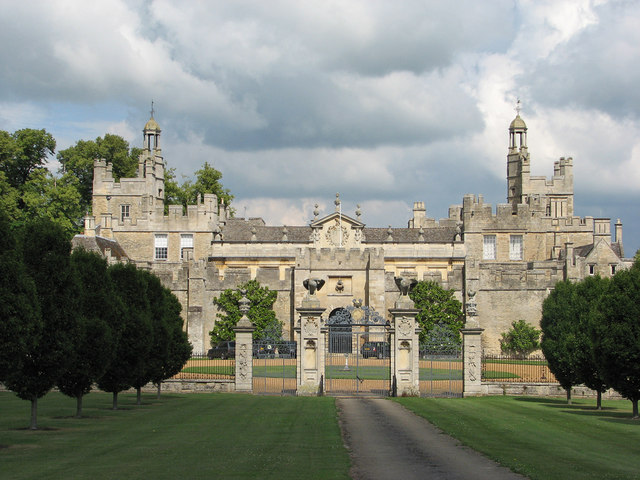
Drayton House

Initially he was a follower of George Grenville's faction, but he increasingly lined up as a supporter of Lord North and, in 1769, he made the alliance formal. Then, in 1769, Lady Elizabeth Germain (daughter of Charles Berkeley, 2nd Earl of Berkeley) died without natural heirs, and left her estates, including Drayton, Northamptonshire, to him. That not only improved his finances but also gave him the chance to take that name formally. On 16 February 1770 his name was legally changed to George Germain by Act of Parliament under terms of the will of Lady Elizabeth Germain, widow of Sir John Germain, 1st Baronet. After 1770, he was known as Lord George Germain (as a Duke's cadet son).

== Secretary of State ==
=== Appointment ===
On 10 November 1775, Germain was appointed Secretary of State for the American Department replacing Lord Dartmouth in the post. At that time, North's cabinet had three secretaries of state; one each for Europe (the Northern Department), America, and the rest of the world (the Southern Department). Besides international relations, the secretaries were responsible for a great deal of Colonial administration and for military operations within their area. That made Germain the primary minister responsible for suppressing the rebellion that had broken out in 1775 in the colonies. He promoted or relieved generals, took care of provisions and supplies and became involved with the strategic planning of the war.

=== American War of Independence ===
In 1776, he worked with General John Burgoyne to plan, support and issue orders for the Saratoga campaign, a British attack from Canada through New York to separate New England from the regions south of there, an expected move expected to end the rebellion. Germain sent unclear orders to General William Howe, who captured the Americans' capital of Philadelphia rather than joining with Burgoyne's army. This contributed to the campaign's disastrous failure with the defeat and surrender of Burgoyne's entire army.

Following the entry of France, Spain and the Dutch Republic into the conflict, British emphasis shifted to focus increasingly on their colonial territories in the Caribbean and India. British troops were withdrawn from Philadelphia and reinforcements were sent to the British West Indies. In 1779 one of Germain's associates, Richard Cumberland, was sent to Madrid for failed talks designed to reach a separate peace settlement with Spain.

==== British disaster at Yorktown ====
In 1781, the confusion involving orders sent to Charles Cornwallis from Henry Clinton contributed to the loss at the Siege of Yorktown.

The news of Yorktown reached London on 25 November 1781, and the messenger went first to Germain's residence at Pall Mall. Germain then went to tell other ministers. Together they went to Lord North, who reportedly cried out "Oh God – It's all over". It was agreed that Germain, rather than North, should take the news to the King who was at Kew. The King's Speech two days later had to be re-written in light of Yorktown. News of the surrender galvanised the opposition, and the government majorities began to shrink over the following months with calls for resignations of senior ministers. Germain drew up a plan to continue the war by using the existing British bases in Charleston, New York, Savannah, and Canada to harass the American coastline and frontiers. He also advocated re-occupying Newport in Rhode Island to give a foothold in New England.

=== Departure from office ===
Germain became a target for the opposition and was eventually persuaded to step down in exchange for a peerage, and in February 1782, he was made Baron Bolebrooke, in the County of Sussex, and Viscount Sackville, of Drayton in the County of Northampton. That was considered essential if the North government was to survive by bringing in factions of the opposition to which Germain was personally objectionable. He was replaced by Welbore Ellis. In spite of Germain's departure, the North government fell shortly afterwards in February 1782 and was followed by a period of political instability. Shortly after the fall of the North government, news arrived of the decisive British naval victory at the Battle of the Saintes in the Caribbean, which would have boosted the government if it had still been in power and British successes late in the war came partly thanks to the strategic dispositions made by North and Germain. The Shelburne government agreed to the Peace of Paris, which brought an end to the war in 1783 and recognised the independence of the United States.

== Later life ==
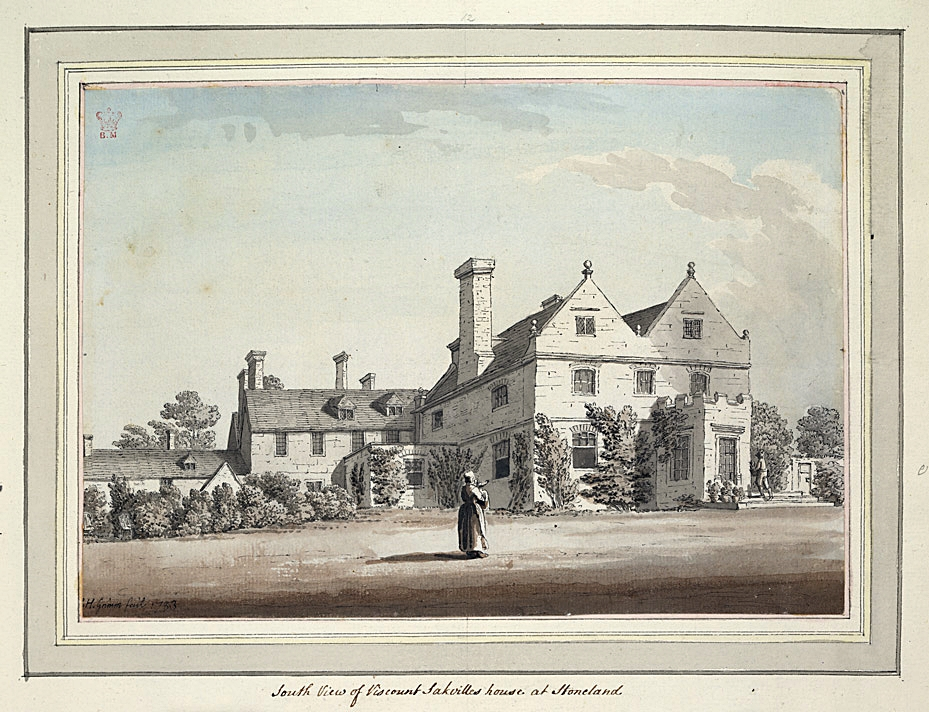
Stoneland Lodge, Sussex

The controversy over Lord Germain's handling of the war continued. Some members were opposed to his taking a seat in the House of Lords, an almost unprecedented incident. However, he was admitted to the Lords, where he was staunchly defended by Lord Thurlow, and his declining health soon made the issue irrelevant. He retired to his country home at Stoneland Lodge and died there in 1785. He maintained that he had not been a coward at Minden. Following his death, a defence of Germain's reputation was written by Richard Cumberland. A trove of the subject's letters were published by the Historical Records Commission beginning in 1904 under the title Report on the manuscripts of Mrs. Stopford-Sackville, of Drayton House, Northhamptonshire / with a new introduction and preface by George Athan Billias.

The Drayton House estate passed to his son Charles, who later became the 5th (and last) Duke of Dorset. The Stoneland estate (or Buckhurst Park as it came to be known) passed via the wife of the late 3rd Duke of Dorset to her daughter Countess de la Warr on the Dowager Duchess's death in 1825.

== Places named after him ==
- Sackville Street, Toronto, Ontario, Canada
- Namesake of Fort Sackville (Nova Scotia), Canada
- Lower Sackville, Nova Scotia and Upper Sackville, Nova Scotia
- Germain Street, Saint John, New Brunswick
- Sackville, New South Wales
- Town of Sackville, New Brunswick. Established in 1762 by settlers ("New England planters") from Rhode Island and southern Massachusetts, the Sackville Township, named for Viscount Sackville, was formally created in 1765; by 1772 it was sufficiently populated to send a representative to the Nova Scotia House of Assembly. It became part of the Province of New Brunswick in 1784. The Town was incorporated in 1903.

Parliament of Ireland
Preceded by William Flower; William Stannus	Member of Parliament for Portarlington; 1733–1761; With: William Henry Dawson	Succeeded by George Hartpole; John Damer
Parliament of Great Britain
Preceded by Thomas Revell; David Papillon	Member of Parliament for Dover; 1741–1761; With: Thomas Revell to 1752; William Cayley 1752–55; Peter Burrell 1755–56; Hugh Valence Jones 1756–59; Edward Simpson from 1759	Succeeded by Edward Simpson; Sir Joseph Yorke
Preceded by Joseph Yorke; Sir Whistler Webster	Member of Parliament for East Grinstead; March – December 1761; With: Charles Sackville, Earl of Middlesex	Succeeded by Charles Sackville, Earl of Middlesex; Sir Thomas Hales, 3rd Bt
Preceded by Sir Charles Farnaby; John Irwin	Member of Parliament for East Grinstead; 1767–1782; With: John Irwin	Succeeded by Henry Arthur Herbert; John Irwin
Political offices
Preceded by Edward Weston	Chief Secretary for Ireland; 1750–1755	Succeeded by Henry Seymour Conway
Preceded by The Earl of Dartmouth	First Lord of Trade; 1775–1779	Succeeded by The Earl of Carlisle
Preceded by The Earl of Dartmouth	Colonial Secretary; 1775–1782	Succeeded by Welbore Ellis
Masonic offices
Preceded by The Lord Kingston	Grandmaster of the Grand Lodge of Ireland; 1751–1753	Succeeded by The Viscount Mountjoy
Military offices
Preceded by Thomas Bligh	Colonel of Lord George Sackville's Regiment of Foot; 1746–1749	Succeeded by Viscount Bury
Preceded by James Cholmondeley	Colonel of the Lord George Sackville's Regiment of Dragoons; 1749–1750	Succeeded by Sir John Whitefoord
Preceded by James Cholmondeley	Colonel of the 3rd Regiment of Horse (Carabiniers); 1750–1757	Succeeded by Louis Dejean
Preceded by Sir John Ligonier	Lieutenant-General of the Ordnance; 1757–1759	Succeeded by Marquess of Granby
Preceded by William Herbert	Colonel of the 2nd (The Queen's) Regiment of Dragoon Guards; 1757–1759	Succeeded by John Waldegrave
Peerage of Great Britain
New creation	Viscount Sackville; 1782–1785	Succeeded by Charles Germain
