= Arthur Blennerhassett (1799–1843) =

British politician

Arthur Blennerhassett (1 January 1799 – 23 January 1843) was an Irish politician.

He was born the son of Arthur and Dorcas née Twiss Blennerhassett and educated at Trinity College Dublin.

He was appointed High Sheriff of Kerry for 1821. In the 1832 elections for Tralee he fought a duel with the Liberal candidate Maurice O'Connell (MP). Neither was hurt and O'Connell went on to win the seat. Blennerhassett later served in British Parliament as Member of Parliament (MP) for County Kerry from 1837 to 1841.

He died whilst staying in Nantes, France aged only 44. He had married Frances Grady in 1821; they lived at Ballyseedy and had 9 children. He was a cousin of Sir William Godfrey, 3rd Baronet.

Parliament of the United Kingdom
Preceded by Morgan John O'Connell; Frederick William Mullins	Member of Parliament for County Kerry; 1837–1841; With: Morgan John O'Connell	Succeeded by Morgan John O'Connell; William Browne
