= John Irwin (British Army officer) =

British Army officer

General The Right Honourable Sir John Irwin KB
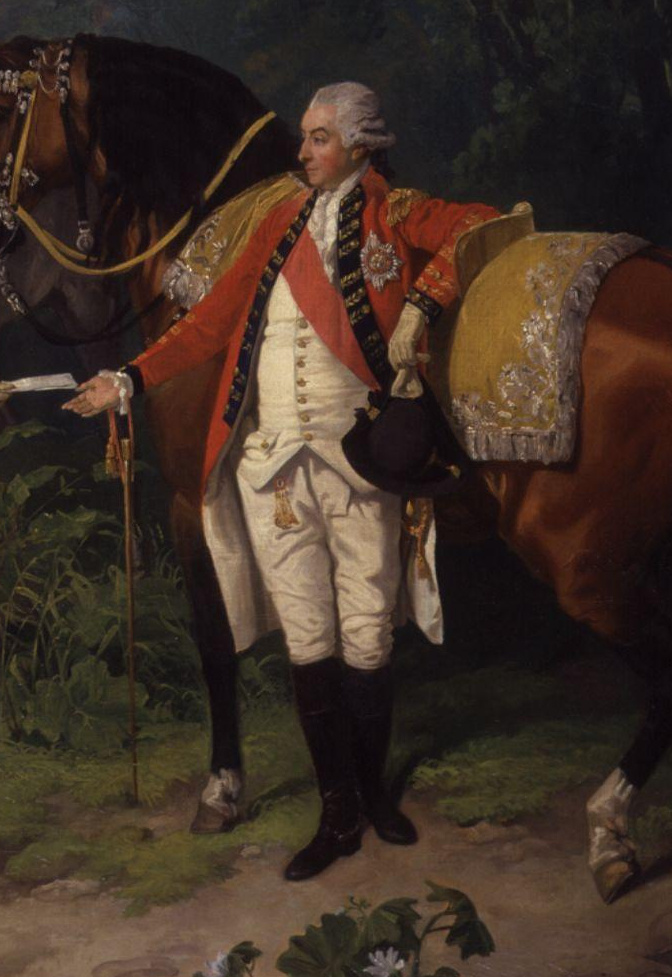
- Portrait by Francis Wheatley, 1781
- Born: 1727/8; Dublin, Ireland
- Died: May 1788; Parma, Italy
- Military career
- Allegiance: Great Britain
- Branch: British Army
- Rank: General
- Conflicts: Seven Years' War
- Awards: Knight of the Order of the Bath

General Sir John Irwin KB (1727/28 – May 1788) was a British Army officer who served in the Seven Years' War.

== Career ==
Educated in Ireland, Irwin was commissioned into the 5th Regiment of Foot in 1736. He served in an attack on the French coast in 1758 and then fought under Prince Ferdinand of Brunswick in Germany in 1760.

He served as Member of Parliament (MP) for East Grinstead from 1762 to 1783, Governor of Gibraltar from 1765 to 1767, member of the Irish privy council, and as Commander-in-Chief, Ireland from 1775 to 1782. Losing the last of these posts on the fall of Lord North's administration in March 1782, he moved back into his house in Piccadilly and his place in parliament, rising to full General and retiring from parliament in 1783. In debt, in 1783 he moved to France and then Parma, where he was welcomed by Ferdinand, Duke of Parma and Maria Amalia, Duchess of Parma, and hosted British ex-patriates and visitors to the city until his death.

== Family ==
He married three times: to Elizabeth Henry in 1749, to Anne Barry in 1753 and finally to Caroline with whom he had two children.

Parliament of Great Britain
Preceded by Charles Sackville; Sir Thomas Hales, Bt	Member of Parliament for East Grinstead; 1762–1783; With: Earl of Middlesex 1762–1765; Sir Charles Farnaby 1765–1767; Lord George Sackville 1767–1782; Henry Arthur Herbert 1782–1783	Succeeded by Henry Arthur Herbert; George Medley
Military offices
Preceded by Edward Cornwallis	Governor of Gibraltar; 1765–1767	Succeeded by Robert Boyd (acting)
Preceded by Sir David Cunynghame	Colonel of the 57th (West Middlesex) Regiment of Foot; 1767–1780	Succeeded by John Campbell
Preceded by George Augustus Eliott	Commander-in-Chief, Ireland; 1775–1782	Succeeded by John Burgoyne
Preceded by George Augustus Eliott	Governor of Londonderry; 1775–1776	Succeeded by John Hale
Preceded by Sir William Augustus Pitt	Colonel of the 3rd Regiment of Horse (Carabiniers); 1780–1788	Succeeded by The Earl of Carhampton
