= Charles O'Connell (Irish politician) =

Charles O'Connell (1805–1877) from Ballynabloun, County Kerry, was an Irish politician, the Member of Parliament for County Kerry from 1832 to 1835, sitting as a member of the Whig party.

== Life ==
He was born on 12 August 1805, the son of Daniel O'Connell of Ballinabloun and Theresa Lombard.

O'Connell served as an officer in the 73rd Regiment. He married Catherine (Kate), the second daughter of Daniel O'Connell in 1832 and was known by the nickname Long Charlie.

He died aged 71 on 20 January 1877.

Parliament of the United Kingdom
Preceded by Daniel O'Connell; Frederick Mullins	Member of Parliament for County Kerry; 1831–1835; With: Frederick Mullins	Succeeded by Morgan John O'Connell; Frederick Mullins
