= William Browne (MP for Kerry) =

Irish politician

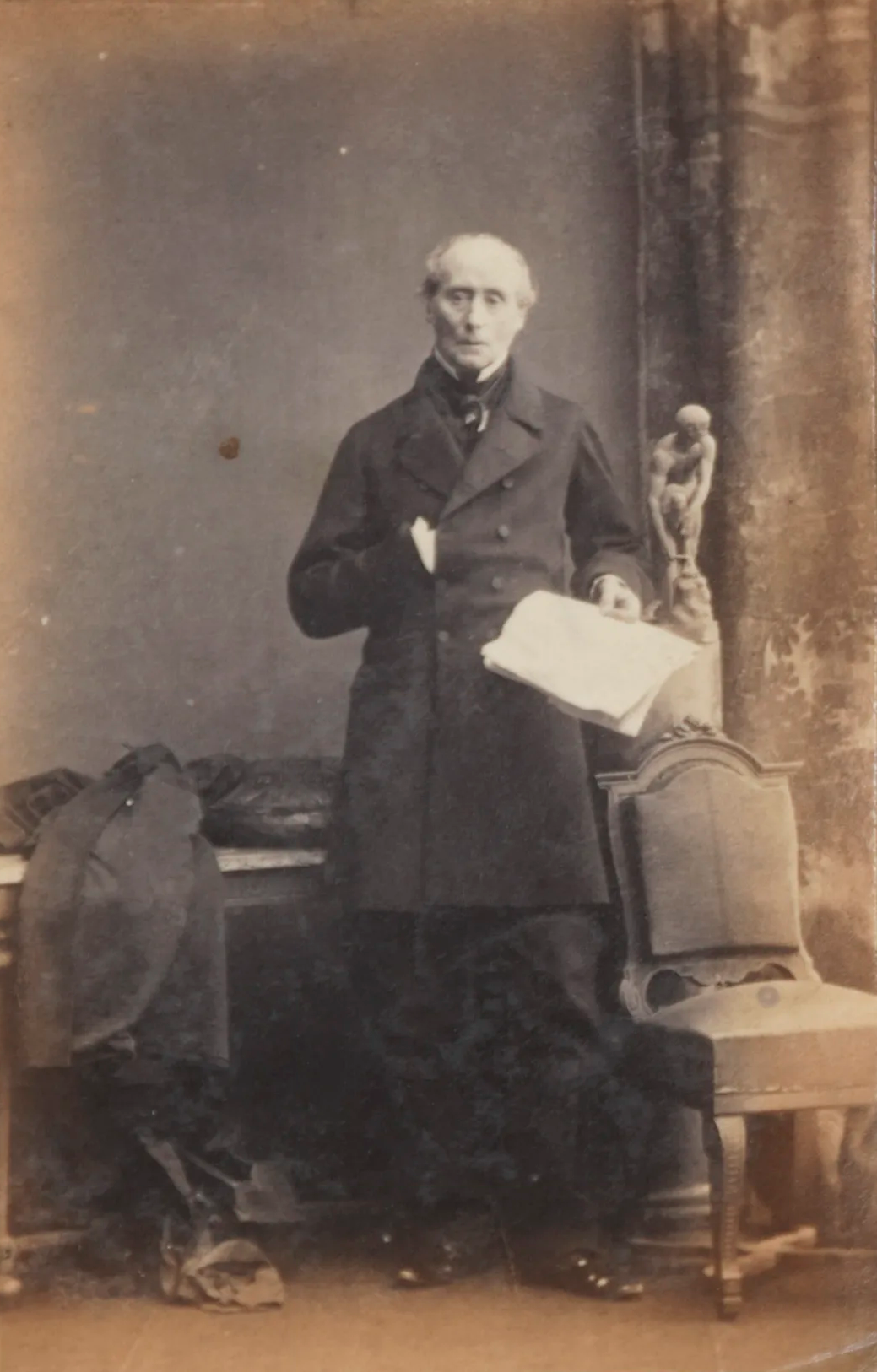
Portrait by Camille Silvy, 1861

William Browne (1 November 1791 – 4 August 1876) was an Irish politician in the Parliament of the United Kingdom.

He was a younger son of Valentine Browne, 1st Earl of Kenmare.

He was Member of Parliament (MP) for County Kerry from 1830 to 1831 and 1841 to 1847 and was appointed High Sheriff of Kerry for 1832.

He married Anne Frances, the daughter of Thomas Segrave of Dublin. They had no children.

Parliament of the United Kingdom
Preceded by Maurice FitzGerald; William Hare	Member of Parliament for County Kerry; 1830–1831; With: Maurice FitzGerald	Succeeded by Frederick Mullins; Daniel O'Connell
Preceded by Arthur Blennerhassett; Morgan John O'Connell	Member of Parliament for Kerry; 1841–1847; With: Morgan John O'Connell	Succeeded by Henry Arthur Herbert; Morgan John O'Connell
