= Frederick Mullins =

Irish politician

Frederick William Mullins, known after 1841 as Frederick William De Moleyns (29 June 1804 – 17 March 1854), was an Irish politician in the Parliament of the United Kingdom. He was a Member of Parliament (MP) for County Kerry from 1831 to 1837, as a Whig, later termed Liberal.

Mullins was the son of the Hon. Frederick Ferriter Mullins, a Church of Ireland clergyman who was Rector of Killiney, County Kerry, and the son of Thomas Mullins, 1st Baron Ventry. Frederick William was educated at Trinity College Dublin and trained as a barrister. Besides radical politics, he was also an interested follower of science.

== Parliament ==
Mullins was a follower of Daniel O'Connell, who became his mentor and co-member for the County Kerry seat when Mullins was returned unopposed at a by-election in 1831. He was returned again in the General Election of 1832, but lost his seat in 1837 when voters criticized his increasing absenteeism from the constituency.

== After Parliament ==
In 1839 he was prosecuted at the Bail Court over offences relating to a bill of exchange.

In 1841, at the insistence of his cousin the 3rd Baron Ventry, he assumed the surname De Moleyns in lieu of his patronymic. The same year he obtained a patent "for the production of electricity and its application for illumination and motion".

In 1854, he was prosecuted at the City of London Police Court for forging a signature to a power of attorney with intent to defraud the Bank of England of £1,500. He protested his innocence but lacking funds to defend himself he was committed to Newgate Prison where he died suddenly, a week later, at the age of 49.

His personal estate, then worth £750, was insufficient when his will was finally probated in 1891. His heir, a nephew, refused to inherit because he did not want to accept the conditions of changing his own surname to De Moleyns and living for one in every four years in County Kerry. Under the will the money passed to University College, London for purpose of endowing a professorship in electrical science. The funds were insufficient so instead a trust fund, called the De Moleyns Fund, was set up in his memory by the university for the purpose of purchasing electrical equipment.

Parliament of the United Kingdom
Preceded by Maurice FitzGerald; William Browne	Member of Parliament for County Kerry; 1831–1837; With: Daniel O'Connell 1831–1832; Charles O'Connell 1832–1835; Morgan John O'Connell 1835–1852	Succeeded by Morgan John O'Connell; Arthur Blennerhassett
