= Valentine Browne, 4th Earl of Kenmare =

British courtier and politician

The Right Honourable The Earl of Kenmare KP PC
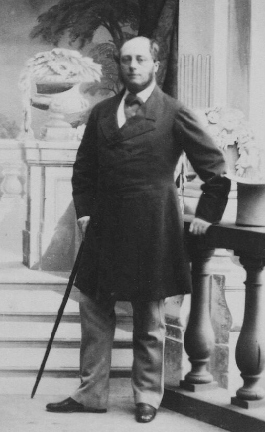
- Browne in 1860

Lord Chamberlain of the Household
- In office 3 May 1880 – 9 June 1885
- Monarch: Victoria
- Prime Minister: William Gladstone
- Preceded by: The Earl of Mount Edgcumbe
- Succeeded by: The Earl of Lathom
- In office 10 February 1886 – 20 July 1886
- Monarch: Victoria
- Prime Minister: William Gladstone
- Preceded by: The Earl of Lathom
- Succeeded by: The Earl of Lathom

Personal details
- Born: 16 May 1825
- Died: 9 February 1905 (aged 79)
- Party: Liberal
- Spouse: Gertrude Thynne (d. 1913)

Colonel Valentine Augustus Browne, 4th Earl of Kenmare KP, PC (16 May 1825 – 9 February 1905), styled Viscount Castlerosse from 1853 to 1871, was a British courtier and Liberal politician. He held office in every Whig or Liberal administration between 1856 and 1886, notably as Lord Chamberlain of the Household under William Gladstone between 1880 and 1885 and in 1886.

== Background ==
Browne was the son of Thomas Browne, 3rd Earl of Kenmare, by his wife Catherine O'Callaghan, daughter of Edmund O'Callaghan, of Kilgory, County Clare. He became known by the courtesy title Viscount Castlerosse when his father succeeded in the earldom of Kenmare in 1853. The Kenmare estate which Browne inherited from his father amounted, in the 1870s, to over 117,000 acres, predominantly in County Kerry.

In 1872, the 4th Earl of Kenmare decided to build an Elizabethan-Revival manor house, called Killarney House, on a hillside with extensive views of Lough Leane. The cost was well over £100,000. This house was the replacement for Kenmare House, built in 1726, as the seat of the Earls of Kenmare. The old house was demolished.

== Political career ==
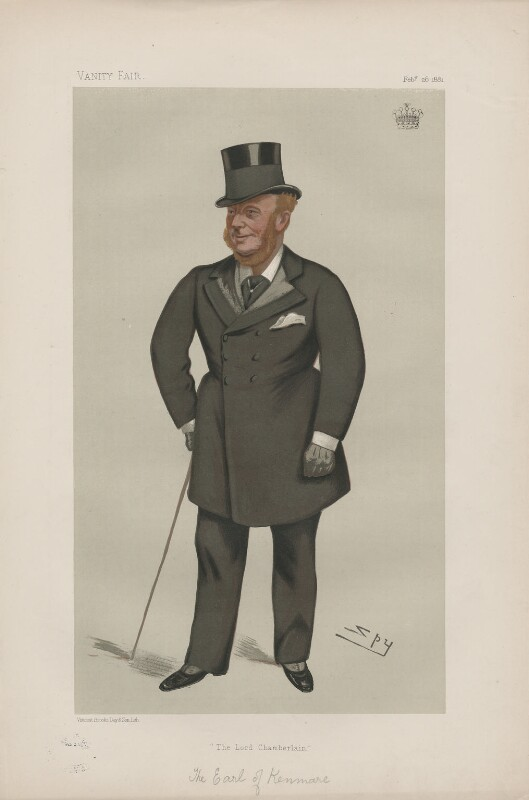
Browne caricatured by Leslie Ward

Lord Castlerosse was appointed High Sheriff of Kerry for 1851. The following year he was returned to parliament as one of two representatives for County Kerry. In 1856 he was appointed Comptroller of the Household under Lord Palmerston, a post he held until the government fell in 1858.

He was sworn of the Privy Council in February 1857. When Palmerston resumed office in 1859, Castlerosse became Vice-Chamberlain of the Household, which he remained until 1866, the last year under the premiership of Lord Russell. He again became Vice-Chamberlain of the Household in 1868 in William Gladstone's first administration.

In December 1871 he succeeded his father in the earldom and took his seat in the House of Lords. He consequently resigned as Vice-Chamberlain (a post normally held by a commoner) and in February 1872 he was appointed a Lord-in-waiting, i. e. a government whip in the House of Lords. In June of that year he was made a Knight of the Order of St Patrick. The Liberal government fell in 1874. Gladstone returned as prime minister in 1880, when Lord Kenmare was appointed Lord Chamberlain of the Household.

He held this office until 1885 and again briefly in Gladstone's third administration between February and July 1886. Apart from his political career he was also Lord-Lieutenant of Kerry between 1866 and 1905. He was Honorary Colonel of the Kerry Militia (from 1881 designated as the 4th (Militia) Battalion of the Royal Munster Fusiliers) from 1866 until he retired in December 1902 and was succeeded by his son.

== Family ==
Lord Kenmare married Gertrude Thynne, daughter of Reverend Lord Charles Thynne, Canon of Canterbury, and granddaughter of Thomas Thynne, 2nd Marquess of Bath, on 28 April 1858. They had three children:

- Lady Margaret Theodora May Catherine Browne (d. 1940), married G.C. Douglas in 1889, died childless.
- Valentine Charles Browne, 5th Earl of Kenmare (1860–1941)
- Hon. Cecil Augustine Browne (1864–1887)

== Death ==
Lord Kenmare died on 9 February 1905, aged 79, and was succeeded in the earldom by his eldest and only surviving son, Valentine. The Countess of Kenmare died in February 1913.

Parliament of the United Kingdom
Preceded by Morgan John O'Connell; Henry Arthur Herbert	Member of Parliament for County Kerry; 1852–1871; With: Henry Arthur Herbert 1852–1866; Henry Arthur Herbert 1866–1871	Succeeded by Henry Arthur Herbert; Rowland Ponsonby Blennerhassett
Political offices
Preceded by Viscount Drumlanrig	Comptroller of the Household; 1856–1858	Succeeded by Hon. George Weld-Forester
Preceded by Viscount Newport	Vice-Chamberlain of the Household; 1859–1866	Succeeded by Lord Claud Hamilton
Preceded by Lord Claud Hamilton	Vice-Chamberlain of the Household; 1868–1872	Succeeded by Lord Richard Grosvenor
Preceded by The Earl of Mount Edgcumbe	Lord Chamberlain; 1880–1885	Succeeded by The Earl of Lathom
Preceded by The Earl of Lathom	Lord Chamberlain; February–July 1886	Succeeded by The Earl of Lathom
Honorary titles
Preceded by Henry Arthur Herbert	Lord Lieutenant of Kerry; 1866–1905	Succeeded by The Earl of Kenmare
Peerage of Ireland
Preceded by Thomas Browne	Earl of Kenmare; 1871–1905	Succeeded by Valentine Browne
