= Kerry Militia =

Volunteer military organisation in Ireland

The Kerry Militia was a military organization of volunteer soldiers from County Kerry in Ireland, organised by the Lord Lieutenant of Ireland from the 18th century and lasting until the late 19th century when it was redesignated.

== History ==
=== 18th Century ===
Mention of a militia specific to County Kerry was as early as 1762, when the Lord Lieutenant of Ireland, George Montagu-Dunk, 2nd Earl of Halifax, appointed Francis Thomas-Fitzmaurice, 3rd Earl of Kerry, to be captain of "an independent troop of Militia Horse" in place of his deceased predecessor of the same title, and William Crosbie, 1st Earl of Glandore, then known as the Lord Brandon, to be captain of "an independent troop of Militia dragoons". Lancelot Crosbie was appointed colonel of the dragoons and William Gunne and Richard Morres each appointed lieutenant-colonels of the same, in place of the deceased Sir Thomas Denny and William Denny. The family names FitzMaurice, Crosbie, Denny, Blennerhassett and others were long associated with land-ownership and official representation of County Kerry through the UK Parliament and the Anglican Church, from at least the time of Elizabeth I, and this was in due course reflected amongst leading officers of the Kerry Militia well into the 19th Century.

More frequent usage of the Kerry Militia as a military force occurred from the 1790s; as the need arose, it was marched to and encamped in various locations throughout the island of Ireland. In July 1797, a group of the Kerry Militia passing through Stewartstown, County Tyrone, seeking to billet in the town at the Government's behest, angered some local "Orange Boys and Yeoman" who took offence at green bonnets and ribbons worn by some wives and children of the militiamen. A deadly sectarian engagement ensued - ten privates and a Sergeant Mahoney of the Militia were reported killed and up to six of the other side which had been joined by members of Scottish and English regiments. The dead on the Militia side are remembered by Kerry House in the town and by a headstone in the Roman Catholic graveyard. In 1798, the Militia undertook a forced march north to Leinster where it was involved in the Battle of Ballinamuck, during which the French Army supporting the United Irishmen was defeated.

=== 19th and 20th Centuries ===
During the 1800s, the numbers of men and staff for particular posts varied significantly. It was placed in attendance to support large social events, for example the Killarney Races It was disembodied and re-embodied over several years. An order was received to embody the Kerry Militia in 1854 but only 200 men turned up, 800 short of the target. It was embodied on 13 January 1855 with 369 men "under pay", with the stated hope of double that number to follow. The staff shortage included Militia surgeons - a shortage also experienced at the front-line in the contemporaneous Crimean War, with the suggested cause being low pay and poor prospects. On 7 October 1856, the Militia revolted in Limerick when it was intimated a commanding officer had ordered there would be no usual band accompaniment as they went to a chapel service. A corporal, who struck a major, admitted having taken part in stirring the dissent, was arrested and locked up. A sergeant-major had also been struck. The remaining body of soldiers then revolted, freed the corporal from the guardhouse and paraded him shoulder-high. The entire Militia was confined to barracks. It was disembodied on 18 August 1856 with 560 men, having had 1037 the previous year. Nearly 400 had transferred to army service - many militiamen went to fight in foreign lands throughout the previous years. Henry Herbert, Member of Parliament for Kerry, County Lieutenant, and colonel of the Militia was given governmental instructions to recruit immediately 672 more men to reach the 1222 target to fully re-embody the ranks. The Militia was re-embodied on 2 November 1857, upon which day 600 arrived with the expectation of more in the following weeks.

From the 1 July 1881, the Kerry Militia as a separately designated force changed as it became the 4th (Kerry Militia) Battalion of the Royal Munster Fusiliers (Munster's other militia regiments, the South Cork Light Infantry and the Royal Limerick County Militia became the 3rd and 5th Battalions respectively). The Battalion was still being referred to in the press as the Kerry Militia as late as 1888. It became the 3rd (Reserve) Battalion, Royal Muster Fusiliers, in 1908 when the Militia became the Special Reserve. The Royal Munster Fusiliers was disbanded on 31 July 1922 with the advent of the Irish Free State.
