= Evan Charteris =

British biographer and barrister (1864–1940)

The Honourable Sir Evan Edward Charteris, KC (29 January 1864 – 16 November 1940) was a British biographer, historian, barrister and arts administrator. He published notable biographies of his friend John Singer Sargent and of Edmund Gosse.

== Life ==
Evan Edward Charteris was the youngest child of Francis Charteris, 10th Earl of Wemyss and Lady Anne Frederica Anson, second daughter of Thomas Anson, 1st Earl of Lichfield. Educated at Eton, he was gazetted to a commission in the Coldstream Guards before spending 1887–88 at Balliol College, Oxford. Called to the Bar from the Inner Temple in 1891, he practised at the Parliamentary Bar. In 1886, he was one of the founders of the Queen's Club in London.

From 1914 to 1918, he rejoined the Army as a Staff captain. He was made King's Counsel in 1919.

He became chairman of the Trustees of the National Portrait Gallery in 1928 and chairman of the Tate Gallery Board in 1934. He was also a Trustee of the National Gallery and the Wallace Collection. He was knighted in 1932 and elected a member of the Athenaeum in 1938.

On 9 August 1930, he married Lady Dorothy Margaret Browne, the elder daughter of Valentine Browne, 5th Earl of Kenmare and Hon. Elizabeth Baring, and the widow of Lord Edward Arthur Grosvenor.

He died at his residence, Jesmond Hill, Pangbourne, Berkshire.

== Works ==
- (ed.) A short account of the affairs of Scotland: in the years 1744, 1745, 1746, 1907
- William Augustus, Duke of Cumberland, his early life and times (1721-1748), 1913
- William Augustus, Duke of Cumberland and the seven years' war, 1925
- John Sargent: with reproductions from his paintings and drawings, 1927
- The Life and Letters of Sir Edmund Gosse, London, 1931
