= Henry Arthur Herbert (1815–1866) =

Anglo-Irish politician

The Right Honourable Henry Arthur Herbert PC
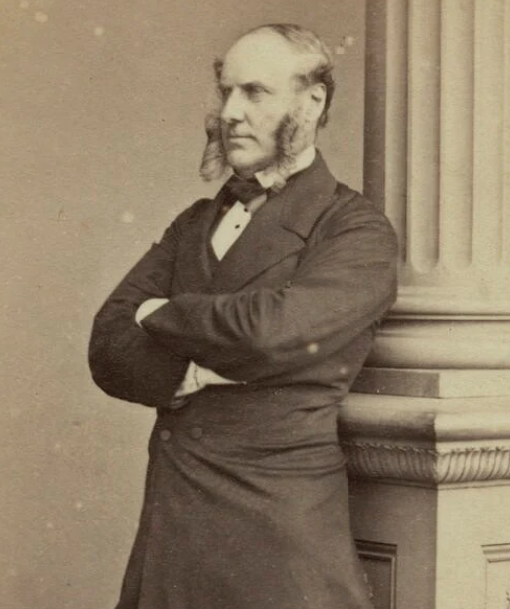

Chief Secretary for Ireland
- In office 27 May 1857 – 21 February 1858
- Monarch: Victoria
- Prime Minister: The Viscount Palmerston
- Preceded by: Edward Horsman
- Succeeded by: Lord Naas

Personal details
- Born: 1815
- Died: 26 February 1866
- Party: Liberal
- Spouse: Mary Balfour (m. 1837)
- Children: 4, including Henry Arthur Herbert
- Education: Trinity College, Cambridge

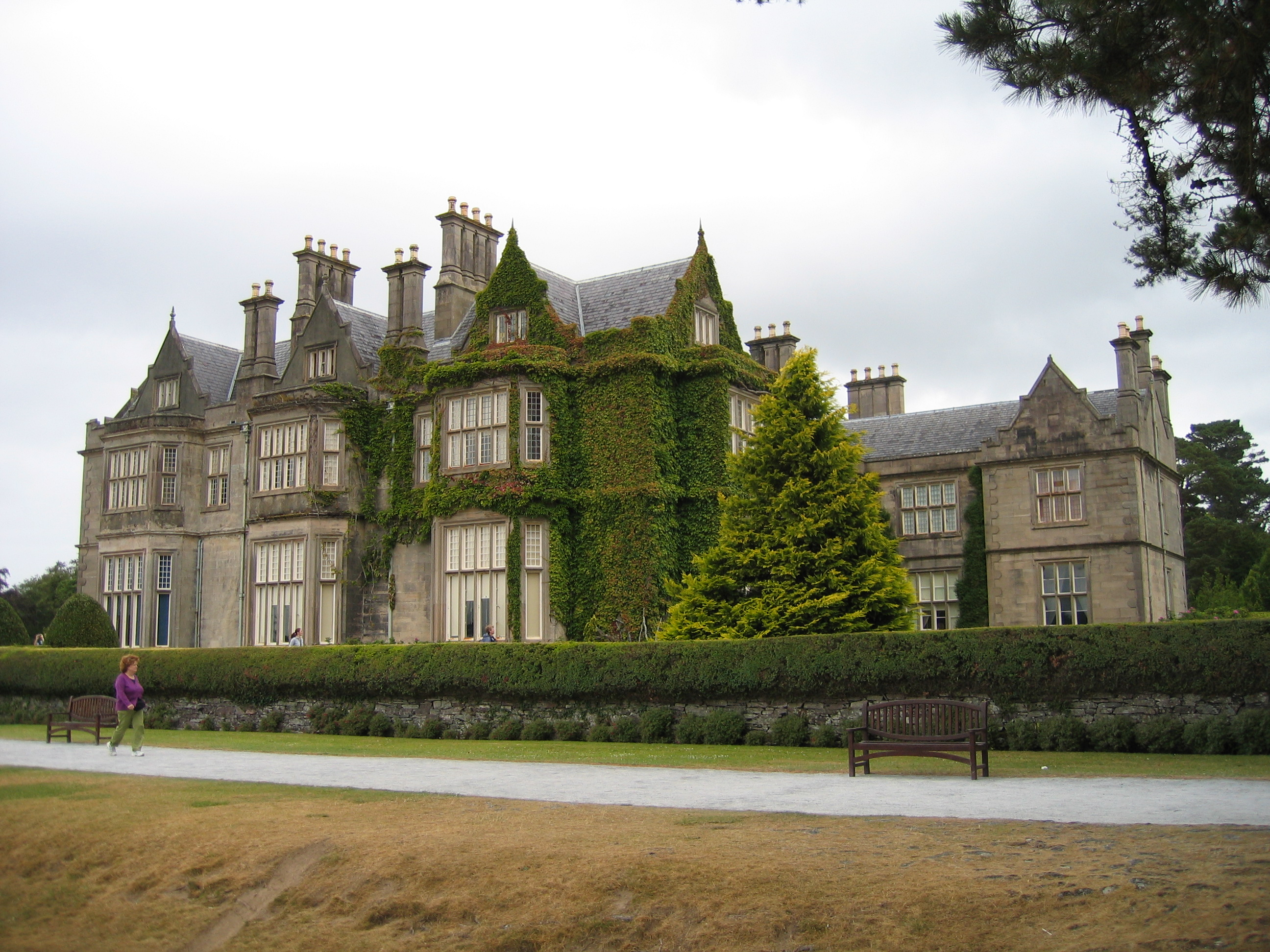
Muckross House

Colonel Henry Arthur Herbert PC (1815 – 26 February 1866), was an Anglo-Irish politician in the Parliament of the United Kingdom.

== Early life ==
Herbert was the son of Charles John Herbert (1785–1823) and Louisa Anne Herbert (1796–1828, née Middleton), who was the daughter of Nathaniel Middleton.

Herbert's paternal grandfather was Henry Arthur Herbert (1756–1821), MP for County Kerry from 1806 to 1813, and his grandmother, Anne, was the daughter of a "Jamaican of colour" named Elizabeth Augier.

He was educated at Eton and graduated from Trinity College, Cambridge in 1835.

== Career ==
Herbert was a Member of Parliament (MP) for County Kerry from 1847 until his death, and served as Chief Secretary for Ireland from 1857 to 1858. He was appointed Lord Lieutenant and Custos Rotulorum of Kerry in 1853.

Herbert was a member of the Kildare Street Club in Dublin.

== Personal life ==
Herbert's family owned the Muckross Estate near Killarney, County Kerry. In September 1837, Herbert married the artist Mary Balfour, whom he had met in Rome. The couple moved to Torc Cottage (in the Muckross Estate) after their wedding. Mary brought a large dowry to the marriage, and in 1839 they began construction of the large Muckross House. It was finished in 1843, shortly before the Great Famine.

They had four children:

- Eleanor Herbert (1839–1907), who married Thomas Blackborne Thoroton-Hildyard, eldest son of Thomas Thoroton-Hildyard, MP for South Nottinghamshire.
- Henry Arthur Herbert (1840–1901), who married Hon. Emily Julia Charlotte Keane, the daughter of Edward Keane, 2nd Baron Keane.
- Charles Herbert (1842–1891)
- Blanche Herbert (1846–1920).

Herbert is buried in Killegy graveyard, near Muckross village.

Parliament of the United Kingdom
Preceded by William Browne; Morgan John O'Connell	Member of Parliament for County Kerry; 1847 – 1866; With: Morgan John O'Connell 1847–1852; Viscount Castlerosse 1852–1871	Succeeded by Viscount Castlerosse; Henry Arthur Herbert
Political offices
Preceded by Edward Horsman	Chief Secretary for Ireland; 1857–1858	Succeeded by Lord Naas
Honorary titles
Preceded by The Earl of Kenmare	Lord Lieutenant of Kerry; 1854–1866	Succeeded by Viscount Castlerosse
