= Lord Lieutenant of Kerry =

Historical government official in Ireland

This is a list of people who have served as Lord Lieutenant of Kerry.

There were lieutenants of counties in Ireland until the reign of James II, when they were renamed governors. The office of Lord Lieutenant was recreated on 23 August 1831 and incorporated the previous position of Custos Rotulorum of Kerry.

== Governors ==
- Charles Wilmot, 1st Viscount Wilmot: 1605–>1615
- Maurice Crosbie, 1st Baron Brandon: 1747–1753
- Francis Thomas-Fitzmaurice, 3rd Earl of Kerry
- John Crosbie, 2nd Earl of Glandore: 1790–1815
- James Crosbie: 1803–1831

== Lord Lieutenants ==
- Valentine Browne, 2nd Earl of Kenmare: 7 October 1831 – 31 October 1853
- Henry Herbert: 22 November 1854 – 26 February 1866
- Valentine Browne, 4th Earl of Kenmare: 24 March 1866 – 9 February 1905
- Valentine Browne, 5th Earl of Kenmare: 4 May 1905 – 1922
