= Rowland Ponsonby Blennerhassett =

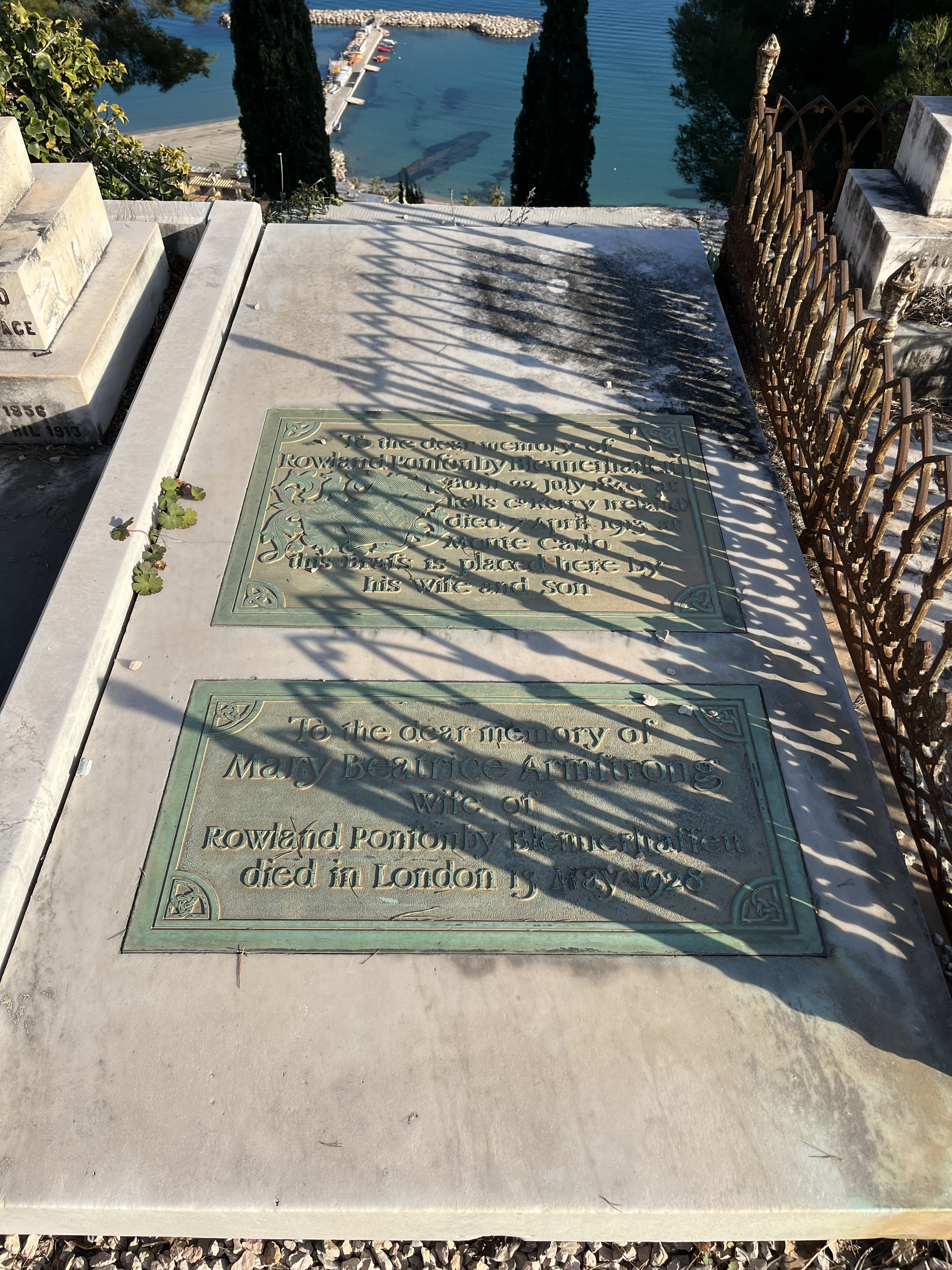
Grave in cemetery of Trabuquet in Menton (06-France)

Rowland Ponsonby Blennerhassett KC, JP (22 July 1850 – 7 April 1913) was an Irish politician.

== Early life ==
He was the only son of Richard Francis Blennerhassett and his wife Honoria Ponsonby, daughter of William Carrique Ponsonby. Blennerhassett was educated at Trinity College Dublin and at Christ Church, Oxford.

== Career ==
In a by-election in 1872, he entered the British House of Commons and sat as member of parliament (MP) for County Kerry until 1885. Blennerhassett was called to the bar by the Inner Temple in 1878, and in April 1894 became bencher and a King's Counsel. He was a justice of the peace for Kerry.

== Personal life ==
On 21 September 1876, he married Mary Beatrice Armstrong, sister of the art historian Walter Armstrong. They had one son. Mary Beatrice is buried in the Armstrong family vault on the inside of the Lebanon Circle in Highgate Cemetery.

Parliament of the United Kingdom
Preceded by Henry Arthur Herbert; Viscount Castlerosse	Member of Parliament for County Kerry; 1872 – 1885; With: Henry Arthur Herbert 1872–1880; Sir Rowland Blennerhassett, 4th Bt 1880–1885	Constituency abolished
