= 1874 United Kingdom general election =

- 31 January – 17 February 1874

All 652 seats in the House of Commons 327 seats needed for a majority
- Turnout: 2,466,037
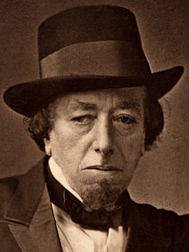

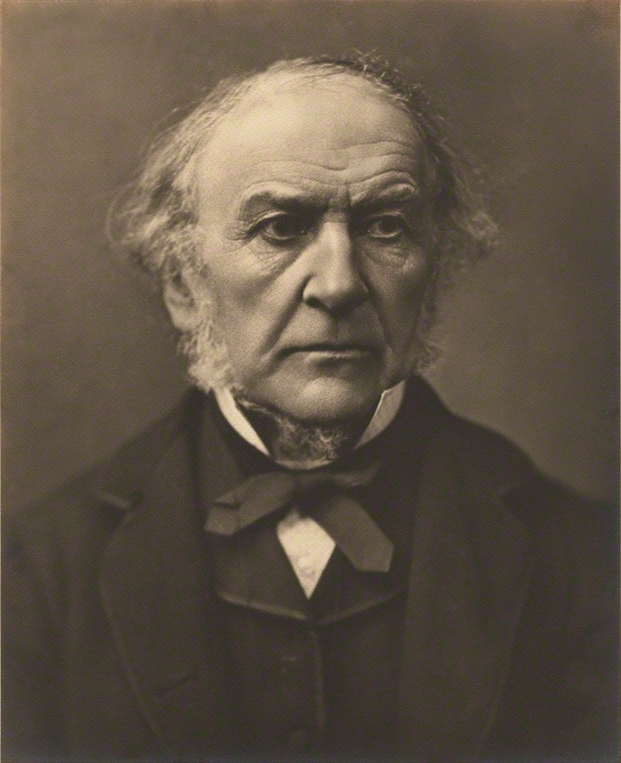

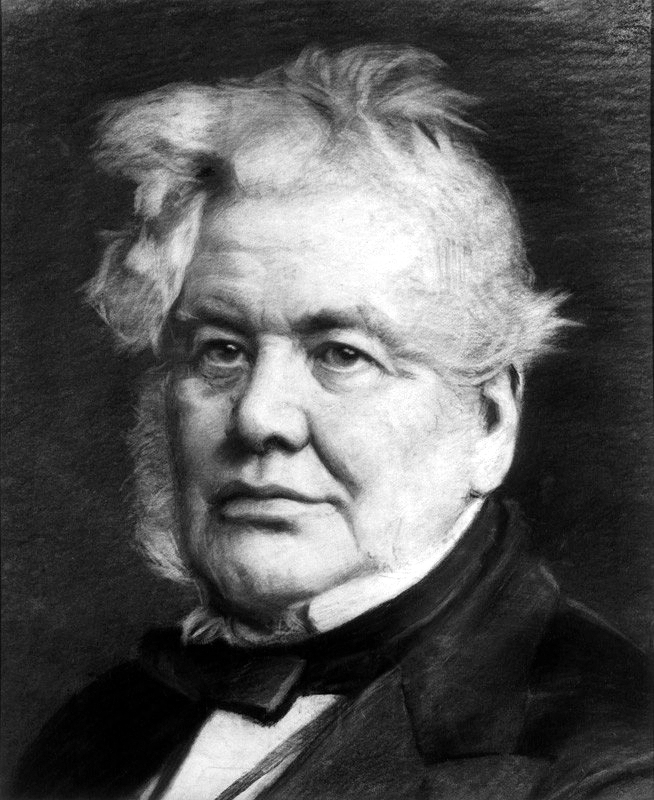
	First party	Second party	Third party
Leader	Benjamin Disraeli	William Ewart Gladstone	Isaac Butt
Party	Conservative	Liberal	Home Rule
Leader since	27 February 1868	3 December 1868	November 1873
Leader's seat	Buckinghamshire	Greenwich	Limerick City
Last election	271 seats, 38.7%	387 seats, 61.2%	Did not contest
Seats won	350	242 (Note: The seat and vote count figures for the Liberals given here include the Speaker of the House of Commons)	60
Seat change	▲79	▼145	▲60
Popular vote	1,091,708	1,281,159	90,234
Percentage	44.3%	52.0%	3.7%
Swing	▲5.6 pp	▼9.2 pp	New party
- Colours denote the winning party

- Composition of the House of Commons after the election
Prime Minister before election
William Gladstone
Liberal
Prime Minister after election
Benjamin Disraeli
Conservative

The 1874 United Kingdom general election was held between 31 January and 17 February 1874. Although the Liberals won the majority of the votes, Benjamin Disraeli's Conservative Party managed to win a majority, largely caused by the number of uncontested seats held by the Conservatives. Although there had been minority Conservative governments in the intervening years, this was the first outright Conservative election victory since Robert Peel's victory in 1841 over thirty years earlier.

The election saw the Irish of the Home Rule League become a significant third party in Parliament, with 60 of 101 of the seats for Ireland. This was the first UK election to use a secret ballot following the 1872 Secret Ballot Act. The Irish Nationalist gains are often attributed to the effects of the Secret Ballot Act, as tenants faced less of a threat of eviction if they voted against the wishes of their landlords. However, the Home Rule League had already won 8 by-elections before the passage of the act, diminishing its often emphasised importance. Also in this election, the first two working-class MPs were elected: Alexander MacDonald and Thomas Burt, both members of the Miners' Union, were elected as Liberal-Labour (Lib–Lab) MPs in Stafford and Morpeth, respectively. The 1867 Reform Act eroded the legislative power of the rural gentry. The 1874 election, especially in Ireland, saw great landowners losing their county seats to tenant farmers.

This is the only time, since the introduction of the secret ballot, that a UK party has been defeated despite receiving an absolute majority of the popular vote. This was primarily because over 100 Conservative candidates were elected unopposed. This meant no votes were cast in those 100 places where the Conservative candidates were anticipated to be popular; in the seats where Liberal candidates did stand, they polled a high proportion of the vote on average.

The election saw 652 MPs elected, six fewer than at the previous election. Following allegations of corruption, the Conservative-held constituencies of Beverley and Sligo, and the Liberal-held constituencies of Bridgwater and Cashel, had been abolished.

== Results ==

UK General Election 1874
Party	Candidates						Votes		
Party	Stood	Elected	Gained	Unseated	Net	% of total	%	No.	Net %
Liberal	489	242			−139	37.12	51.95	1,281,159	−9.5
Conservative	507	350			+79	53.68	44.27	1,091,708	+5.9
Home Rule	80	60	0	0	+60	9.20	3.66	90,234	N/A
Others	4	0	0	0	0	0	0.12	2,936	0.0

=== Voting summary ===
Popular vote
Liberal	51.95%
Conservative	44.27%
Home Rule	3.66%
Others	0.12%

=== Seats summary ===
Parliamentary seats
Liberal	37.12%
Conservative	53.68%
Home Rule	9.2%

=== Regional results ===
==== Great Britain ====
Party	Seats	Seats change	Votes	%	% change
Conservative	319	▲85	1,000,006	44.6	
Liberal	230	▼93	1,241,381	55.4	
Lib-Lab	2	▲2	1,241,381	55.4	
Other	0		2	0.0	
Total	551	▼4	2,241,389	100	

===== England =====
Party	Seats	Seats change	Votes	%	% change
Conservative	280	▲69	905,239	46.2	
Liberal	171	▼75	1,035,268	53.8	
Lib-Lab	2	▲2	1,035,268	53.8	
Other	0		2	0.0	
Total	451	▼4	1,940,509	100	

===== Scotland =====
Party	Seats	Seats change	Votes	%	% change
Liberal	40	▼11	148,345	68.4	
Conservative	18	▲11	63,193	31.6	
Total	58	Steady	211,538	100	

===== Wales =====
Party	Seats	Seats change	Votes	%	% change
Liberal	19	▼4	57,768	60.9	
Conservative	14	▲4	31,574	39.1	
Total	33	Steady	89,342	100	

==== Ireland ====
Party	Seats	Seats change	Votes	%	% change
Home Rule	60	▲60	90,234	39.6	New entry
Irish Conservative	31	▼6	91,702	40.8	−1.1%
Liberal	10	▼56	39,778	18.4	−39.5%
Other	0		2,934	1.2	
Total	101	▼2	224,648	100	

==== Universities ====
Party	Seats	Seats change	Votes	%	% change
Conservative	7	▲1			
Liberal	2	▼1			
Total	9	Steady		100	

== See also ==
- List of MPs elected in the 1874 United Kingdom general election
- 1874 United Kingdom general election in Ireland
