= Muckross House =

Public building in Ireland

Coordinates: 52°01′04″N 9°30′06″W

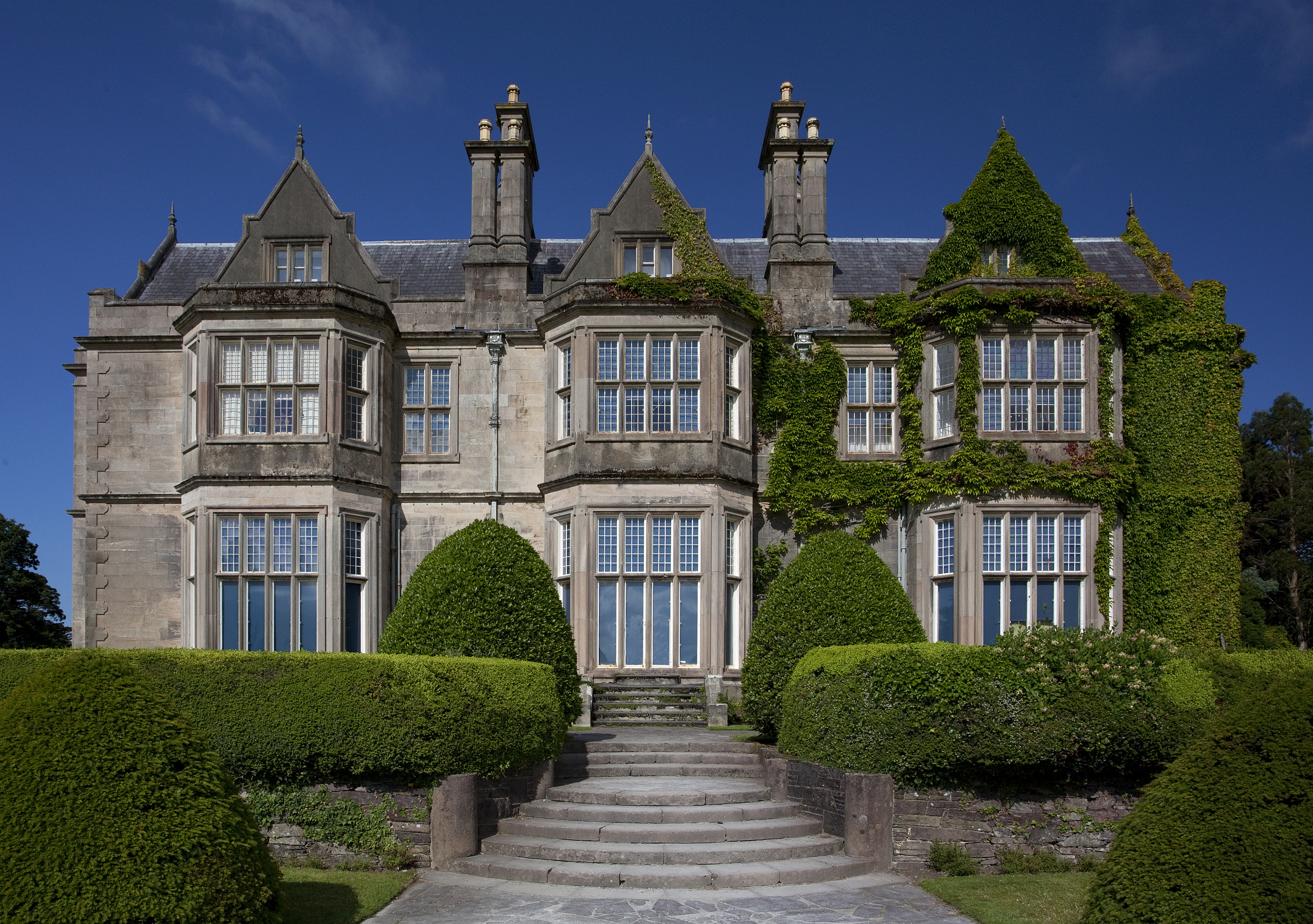
Eastern Facade of Muckross House

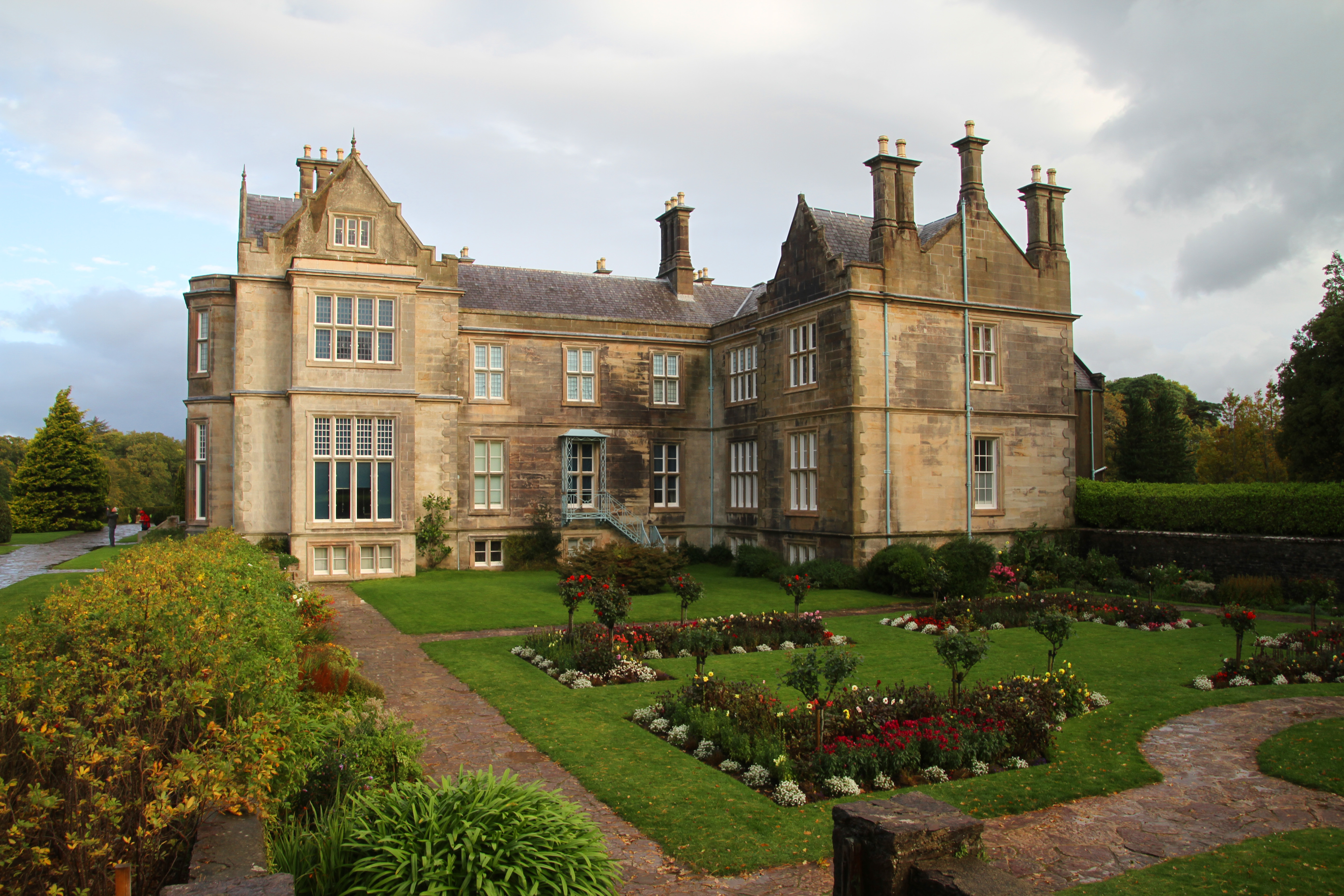
View from north

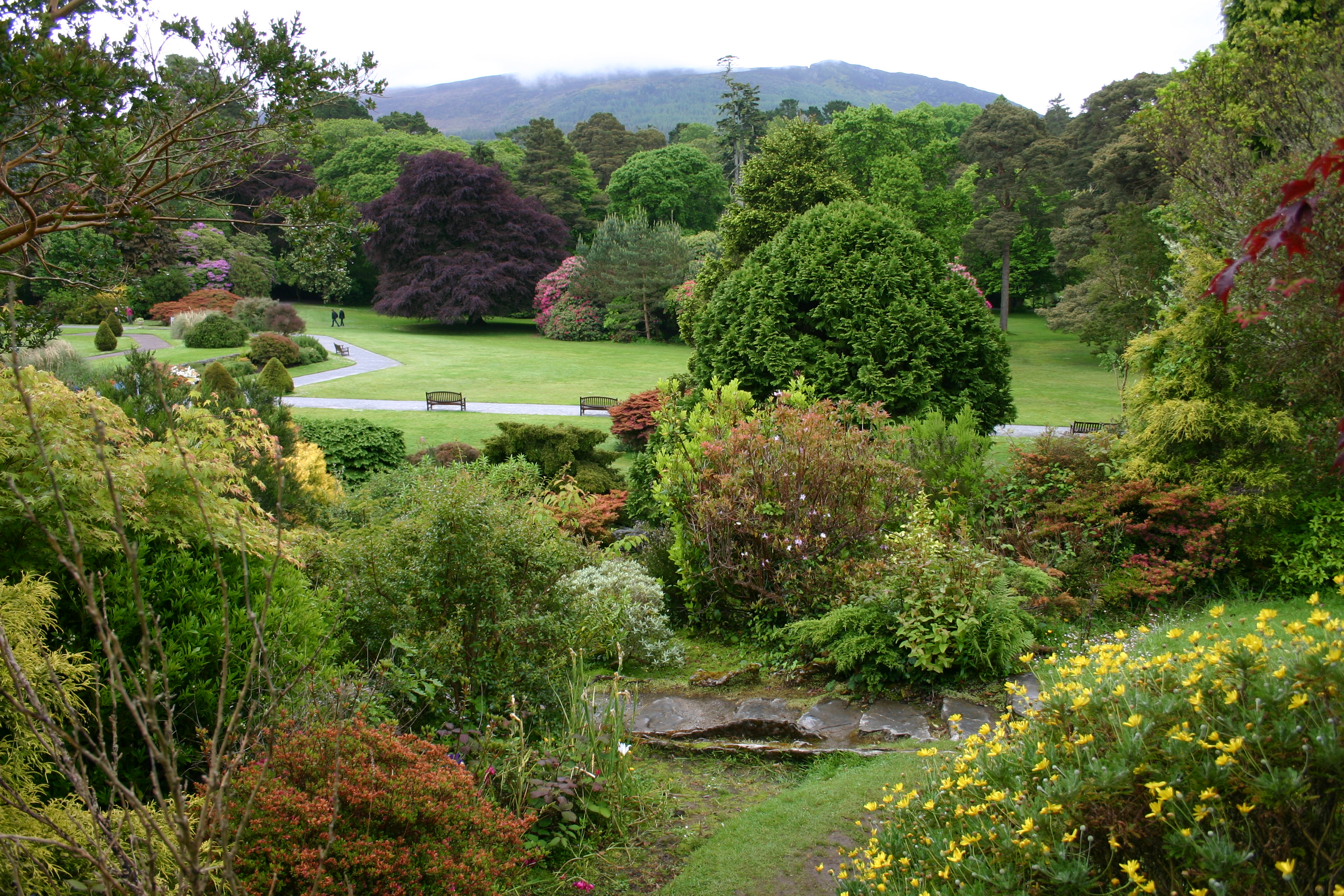
Muckross House gardens

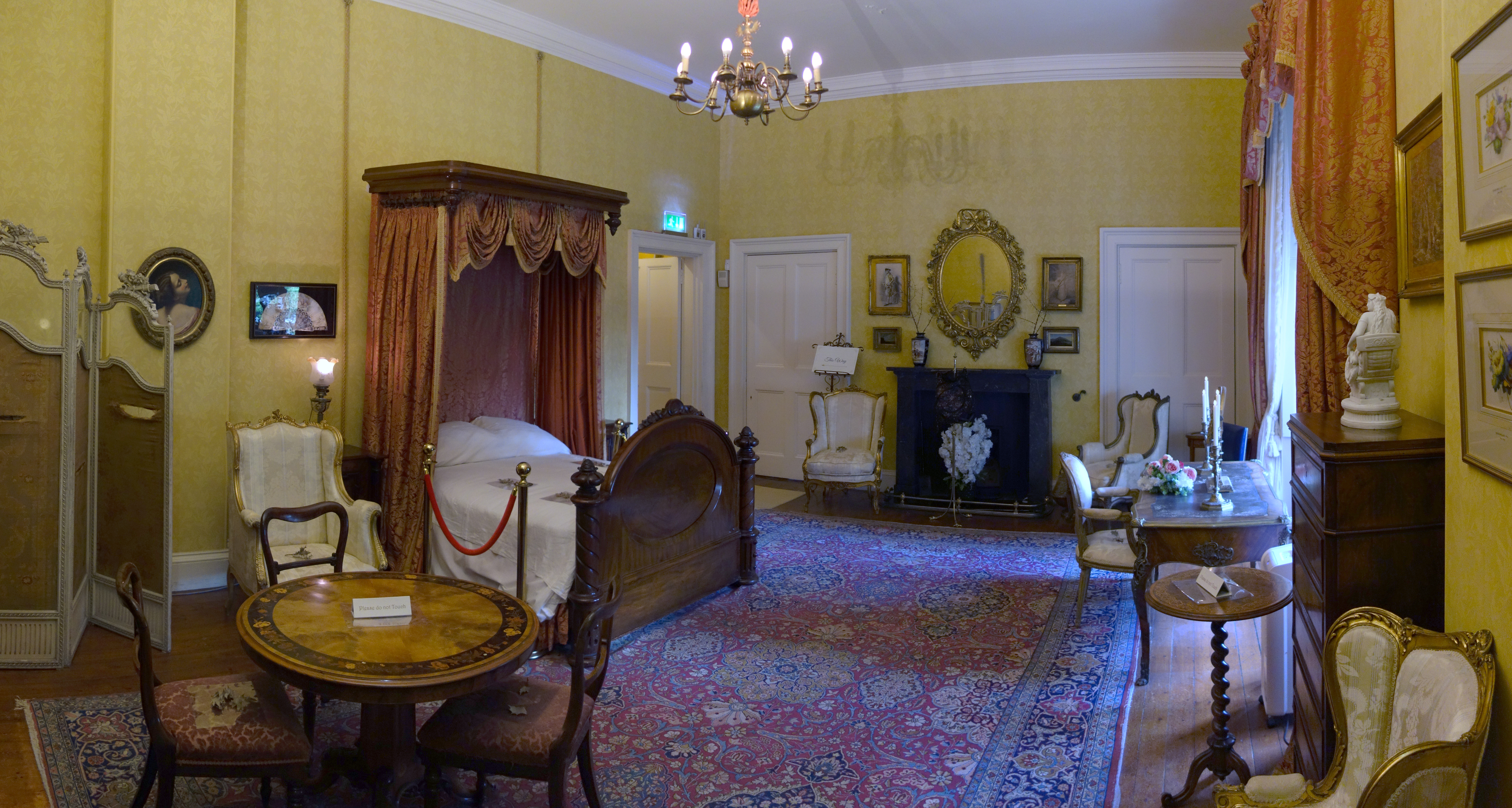
The bedroom where Queen Victoria stayed during her 1861 visit

Muckross House (Irish: Teach Mhucrois) is located on the small Muckross Peninsula between Muckross Lake and Lough Leane, two of the lakes of Killarney, 6 kilometres (3.7 mi) from the town of Killarney in County Kerry, Ireland. In 1932 it was presented by William Bowers Bourn and Arthur Rose Vincent to the Irish nation. It thus became the first National Park in the Irish Free State (now Republic of Ireland) and formed the basis of the present day Killarney National Park. The house now forms part of a visitor attraction marketed as Muckross House, Gardens and Traditional Farms.

== History ==
With sixty-five rooms, it was built in the Tudor style. Extensive improvements were undertaken in the 1850s in preparation for the visit of Queen Victoria in 1861. It is said that these improvements for the Queen's visit were a contributory factor in the financial difficulties suffered by the Herbert family which resulted in the sale of the estate. In 1899 it was bought by Arthur Guinness, Baron Ardilaun who wanted to preserve the dramatic landscape. He did not live in the house, but rented it out to wealthy groups as a hunting lodge.

The park was substantially expanded by the acquisition of land from the former Earl of Kenmare's estate.

== See also ==
- Muckross Abbey
