= MacCarthy dynasty =

Gaelic Irish dynasty

MacCarthy Mac Cárthaigh
- Arms of MacCarthy
- Parent family: Eóganachta
- Country: Kingdom of Munster; Kingdom of Desmond
- Founder: Cárthach mac Saorbhreathach
- Final ruler: Florence MacCarthy
- Historic seat: Blarney Castle
- Titles: King of Munster; King of Desmond; Prince of Carbery; Lord of Kerslawny; Lord of Coshmaing; Lord of Molahiffe; Earl of Clancarty; Viscount Muskerry
- Cadet branches: MacCarthy Reagh; MacCarthy of Muskerry

MacCarthy (Irish: Mac Cárthaigh), also spelled Macarthy, McCarthy or McCarty, is an Irish clan originating from Munster, an area they ruled during the Middle Ages. It was divided into several septs (branches) of which the MacCarthy Reagh, MacCarthy of Muskerry, and MacCarthy of Duhallow were the most notable.

== Naming conventions ==
Male	Daughter (Long)	Daughter (Short)	Wife (Long)	Wife (Short)
Mac Cárthaigh	Iníon Mhic Cárthaigh	Nic Cárthaigh	Bean Mhic Cárthaigh	Mhic Cárthaigh

== History ==
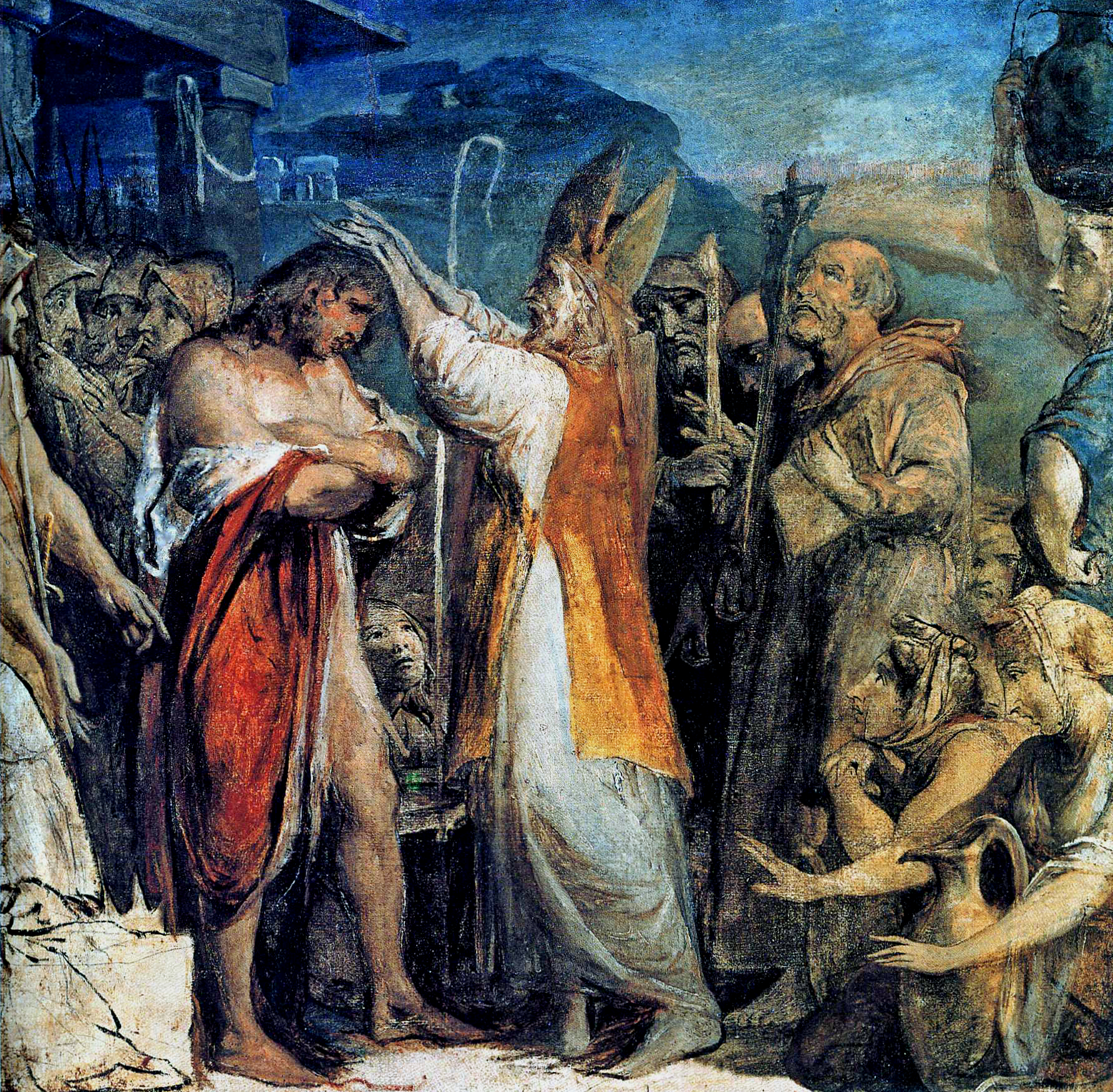
The Baptism of the King of Cashel by St Patrick, painted by James Barry, c. 1780s. Óengus mac Nad Froích, a paternal ancestor from the Eóganacht Chaisil from whom the Mac Cárthaigh descend.

The origin of the MacCarthy dynasty begins with Carthach, an Eóganacht Chaisil king, who died in 1045 in a house fire deliberately started by one of the Lonergans (who were members of the Eóganacht's arch-enemies, the Dál gCais). Carthach was a contemporary and bitter rival of High King Brian Boru, and what would become known as the McCarthy Clan was pushed out of its traditional homelands in the Golden Vale of Tipperary by the expansion of the O'Brien sept in the middle of the twelfth century.

Carthach's son was known as Muireadhach mac Carthaigh (meaning "Muireadhach, son of Carthach"). Such ephemeral patronymics were common at the time. However, when Muireadhach died in 1092 his sons Tadhg and Cormac adopted Mac Carthaigh as an actual surname. Following the treaty of Glanmire in 1118, dividing the kingdom of Munster into Desmond and Thomond, this Tadhg became the first king of Desmond, comprising parts of the modern counties of Cork and Kerry. For almost five centuries they dominated much of Munster, with four major branches: those led by the MacCarthy Mór (Great MacCarthy), nominal head of all the MacCarthys, who ruled over much of south Kerry, the Duhallow MacCarthys, who controlled north-west Cork; MacCarthy Reagh or Riabhach ('grey') based in the Barony of Carbery in south-west Cork; and MacCarthy Muskerry, on the Cork / Kerry border.

Each of these families continued resistance to Norman and English encroachment up to the seventeenth century when, like virtually all the Gaelic aristocracy, they lost almost everything. An exception was Macroom Castle, which passed to the White family of Bantry House, descendants of Cormac Láidir Mac Cárthaigh. This was burnt in 1922 and is part of the local golf club today.

The Muskerry McCarthys' historical seat is Blarney Castle in County Cork. Legend has it that the Blarney Stone was given as a gift to Cormac MacCarthy, King of Desmond, from king Robert the Bruce of Scotland, who presented the 'magical' stone in gratitude for his assistance in the battle of Bannockburn in 1314. The third castle built on the site (the castle which stands to this day) was built by another McCarthy descendant, Dermot McCarthy, in 1446. Dermot was known for his eloquence, hence the Blarney Stone's reputation for imparting the gift of the gab upon those who kiss it.

The number of references to the MacCarthys in the annals, especially the "Annals of Innisfallen", is very great. Carthach was the son of Saoirbhreathach, a Gaelic name which is anglicised as Justin, and in the latter form has been in continuous use among many branches of the McCarthys for centuries. Another male forename similarly associated with them is Finghin, anglice Fineen, but for some centuries past, the name Florence (colloquially Flurry) has been used as its English form. From the thirteenth century, when Fineen MacCarthy decisively defeated the Geraldines in 1261, down to the present day, Fineen or Florence MacCarthys and Justin MacCarthys have been very prominent among the many distinguished men of the name in Irish military, political and cultural history.

Until the dissolution of the kingdom in 1596, the crown was vested in the hereditary possession of the Mac Carthy Mór (by the law of tanistry).

== Branches ==
=== MacCarthy of Muskerry ===
The MacCarthy dynasty of Muskerry is a tacksman branch of the MacCarthy dynasty, the Kings of Desmond. It was founded by Dermot MacCarthy, 1st Lord of Muskerry, second son of Cormac MacCarthy Mor, King of Desmond. Donough MacCarthy, 4th Earl of Clancarty fought in the Williamite War in Ireland for James II of England against William III of England. He was attainted at the defeat in 1691 and the MacCarthys of Muskerry lost the noble titles of Earl of Clancarty, Viscount Muskerry, and Baron Blarney. In 1694, the family lost all noble titles and peerage in Ireland.

=== MacCarthy Reagh ===
The MacCarthy Reagh dynasty are a branch of the MacCarthy dynasty. The MacCarthy Reagh seated themselves as kings of Carbery in what is now southwestern County Cork including Rosscarbery in the 13th century. Their descendants would expand their territories considerably and forge a small, wealthy kingdom distinct and independent from the larger Kingdom of Desmond, as well as largely independent from the Earldom of Desmond and from England, which would last into the early-mid 17th century. The dynasty became very successful during the 14th to 16th centuries, accumulating great wealth and possessing a great army.

== Septs ==
Eleven septs of the illustrious McCarthy family in Kerry are given in Kings History of County Kerry

- (1) Sliocht Owen of Coshmaing
- (2) Sliocht Cormaic of Dunguile
- (3) Sliocht Fineen Duff of Ardeanaght
- (4) Sliocht Clan Donell Finn
- (5) Sliocht nInghean Riddery
- (6) Sliocht Donell Brick
- (7) Sliocht Nedeen
- (8) Sliocht Clan Teige Kittagh
- (9) Sliocht Clan Dermod
- (10) Sliocht Clan Donell Roe
- (11) Sliocht MacFineen

The MacCarthys are closely related to a number of other Munster families. These include the O'Sullivans, O'Callaghans, O'Keeffes, O'Donoghues, and O'Donovans. An early sept of the MacCarthys themselves are the MacAuliffes.

Rulers of the Kingdom of Desmond, the McCarthy stood among the greatest Irish dynasties of the last millennium.

== Notable members ==
- Cormac Laidir MacCarthy, 9th Lord of Muskerry, Irish chieftain, 1411–1494
- Cormac Oge Laidir MacCarthy, 10th Lord of Muskerry, Irish noble, d. 1536
- Cormac MacDermot MacCarthy, great-grandson of Cormac MacCarthy, Lord of Muskerry, d. 1616
- Cormac (Charles) MacCarthy, 1st Viscount Muskerry and Baron of Blarney, son of Cormac MacDermot MacCarthy, d. 1641
- Florence MacCarthy, Irish prince, 1563–1640
- Donagh MacCarthy, Viscount Muskerry and Earl of Clancarty, son of Cormac MacDermot MacCarthy, d. 1665
- Charles MacCarthy, soldier in French and later English service, d. 1665
- Justin MacCarthy, Viscount Mountcashel, younger son of Donough MacCarthy, Viscount Muskerry, d. 1694
- Donough MacCarthy, 4th Earl of Clancarty, grandson of Donough MacCarthy, Viscount Muskerry, 1670–1734
- Nicholas Tuite MacCarthy, renowned Jesuit Preacher, 1769–1833
- Charles MacCarthy, Irish-born soldier who served in the French, Dutch and British armies, 1764–1824
- Robert MacCarty, Viscount Muskerry, Irish Royal Navy officer and colonial administrator, 1685–1769
- Cormac Mac Cárthaigh, d.1138
- Donal Gott MacCarthy, 1247–1252
- Fínghin, 1252–1261

== See also ==
- Gaelic nobility of Ireland
- McCarthy (surname)
- King of Desmond

== Bibliography ==
- Burke, Bernard and Hugh Montgomery-Massingberd, Burke's Irish Family Records, or Burke's Landed Gentry of Ireland. London: Burke's Peerage Ltd. 5th edition, 1976.
- Byrne, Francis J., Irish Kings and High-Kings. Four Courts Press. 2nd edition, 2001.
- Cronnelly, Richard F., Irish Family History Part II: A History of the Clan Eoghan, or Eoghanachts. Dublin. 1864.
- D'Alton, John, Illustrations, Historical and Genealogical, of King James's Irish Army List, 1689 2 vols. London: J.R. Smith. 2nd edition, 1861.
- Laffan, Thomas (1911). Tipperary Families : Being The Hearth Money Records for 1665–1667. James Duffy & Co.
- O'Donovan, John (ed. and tr.), Annála Ríoghachta Éireann. Annals of the Kingdom of Ireland by the Four Masters, from the Earliest Period to the Year 1616. 7 vols. Royal Irish Academy. Dublin. 1848–51. 2nd edition, 1856.
- O'Hart, John, Irish Pedigrees Dublin. 5th edition, 1892.
- Ó hInnse, Séamus (ed. and tr.) and Florence MacCarthy, Mac Carthaigh's Book, or Miscellaneous Irish Annals (A.D. 1114–1437). Dublin Institute for Advanced Studies. 1947.
- O'Keeffe, Eugene (ed. and tr.), Eoganacht Genealogies from the Book of Munster. Cork. 1703. (available here)
- McCarthy (Glas), Daniel, A Historical Pedigree of the Sliochd Feidhlimidh the MacCarthys of Glean-nacroim, from Carthach, twenty-fourth in descent from Oilioll Olum, (1880; W. Pollard)
- O'Brien, Michael J, The McCarthys in Early American History, (1921; New York, Dodd, Mead & Company)
- McCarthy, Samuel Trant, The MacCarthys of Munster: The Story of a Great Irish Sept, (1922: The Dundalgan Press)
