= Currow =

Village in County Kerry, Ireland

Currow An Currach / Corra
- Village
- Location in Ireland
- Coordinates: 52°10′56″N 9°29′51″W
- Country: Ireland
- Province: Munster
- County: County Kerry

Government
  - Dáil Éireann: Kerry
- Time zone: UTC+0 (WET)
  - Summer (DST): UTC+1 (IST (WEST))
- Area code: +353 066
- Irish Grid Reference: Q972043

Currow (Irish: An Currach / Corra) is a rural village in County Kerry in south west Ireland, located approximately 12 km from Killarney and 18 km from Tralee. Currow is situated on the Brown Flesk River, a tributary of the River Maine.

== Geography ==
Currow lies in the electoral division of Killeentierna. Killeentierna Electoral Division covers 3,375 hectares, much of which is arable land, mainly used as pasture for dairy stock. There are also areas of peat land, particularly to the south, where a blanket bog is located on the border with Kilcummin. Currow is mainly a residential area with close links to Castleisland. The main industry is agriculture. Currow is bordered to the west by Farranfore, to the south by Kilcummin, to the east by Scartaglin and to the north by Castleisland. Currans lies north west of Currow, which forms the Killeentierna Parish.

== History ==
Evidence of ancient settlement in the area includes a number of ringfort, fulacht fiadh, souterrain, enclosure and standing stone sites in the townlands of Ranalough, Cloonclogh, Killeentierna and Parknasmuttaun.

The original village of Currow grew up on both sides of the roadway to the north of Flesk Bridge, between two old estates, Dicksgrove and Parkmore, which have influenced the architectural character. The Meredith Family were the landlords of the area, residing in the old Parkmore estate. The first influence of the British came from the Herbert Family during the plantations. Unlike some nearby villages and towns, the village did not see major development during the Celtic Tiger.

Con Houlihan, a columnist with the Sunday World, once wrote how he considered Currow as his 'own favourite' village in Ireland. Although he is undecided whether Currow is a village or a hamlet. He also declared he would someday 'apply to be made a Freeman of Currow'.

== Demographics ==
Historical population (Killeentierna Electoral Division)
Year	Pop.	±%
1821	1,983	—
1831	2,079	+4.8%
1841	2,740	+31.8%
1851	1,792	−34.6%
1861	1,654	−7.7%
1871	1,525	−7.8%
1881	1,615	+5.9%
1891	1,878	+16.3%
1901	1,202	−36.0%
1911	1,114	−7.3%
1926	1,091	−2.1%
1936	1,043	−4.4%
1946	1,019	−2.3%
1951	955	−6.3%
1956	937	−1.9%
1961	886	−5.4%
1966	875	−1.2%
1971	855	−2.3%
1979	862	+0.8%
1981	895	+3.8%
1986	924	+3.2%
1991	896	−3.0%
1996	878	−2.0%
2002	856	−2.5%
2006	892	+4.2%
2011	913	+2.4%

Currow is in the Electoral District (ED) of Killeentierna. Historically a Gaeltacht area, it is within the Rural District of Killarney and is included in the Kerry constituency for national elections. Killeentierna is also the Roman Catholic parish under the Roman Catholic Diocese of Kerry which is made up of Currow, Kilsarcon and Currans. Before 1898, Currow was included under the barony of Trughanacmy. However this form of administrative area has been obsolete since the Local Government Act 1898.

As of the 2006 census, Killeentierna ED had a population of 892 persons (465 males and 427 females). This was a slight increase on 2002 census figures of 856. The 2011 census recorded 913 people in the Killeentierna ED, a 2.4% increase from the 2006 census. In 2022, Killeentierna ED had a population of 872, of whom 762 (87%) were Catholic.

== Facilities ==
As of 2009, Currow had a community centre, primary school, pub, Roman Catholic church, graveyard, small public park and a GAA pitch. There are also several other small enterprises in the area, including an electronic services workshop and hair salon. Currow's post office closed in 2018.

The local national (primary) school, Scoil Mhuire Agus Naomh Threasa (English: St Mary's and Teresa School), serves the area. Originally Scoil Mhuire, the Department of Education amalgamated Scoil Mhuire with Kilsarcon School which centralised resources to a more modern facility in Currow village.

The Church of the Immaculate Conception is located in the centre of the village on a site donated by Richard Meredith, who had connections to the estate house in Dickgrove. This Catholic church was built in the 1950s to designs by Patrick J. Sheahan. It was blessed and dedicated by Rev. Denis Moynihan, Bishop of Kerry, on 2 June 1954.

== Transport ==
=== Road ===
Currow is located approximately 7 km from Castleisland, south of the N23 national primary road, which runs from Castleisland to Farranfore, connecting traffic from the N21 road to the N22 road. Currow Village is connected to both the N22 at Farranfore and the N23 at Lisheenbaun Cross via the R561 regional road. It is located on the old Killarney road.

Bus services, provided by Bus Éireann, are limited to the village. Nearby stops are found in Farranfore and Castleisland.

=== Rail ===
The closest railway station is Farranfore railway station, which is approximately 3.5 km east of Currow. Irish Rail has several inter-city daily services to Dublin, Cork, Tralee and Killarney from this station.

=== Air ===
Kerry Airport is also located at Farranfore on the N23. The runway is only 800m from Currow Village. However the terminal is 5 km in distance by road.

== Media ==
In print media, local notes are included in the pages of the Sliabh Luachra Outlook which is published every Saturday and covers the Sliabh Luachra region. Local notes are also included in The Kerryman newspaper, most often in the South County Edition, which published weekly on a Wednesday.

Currow falls within the broadcast area of Radio Kerry. A documentary on Currow, made in 2000, focused on Currow's sporting heritage and the international rugby players who come from the area. As well as interviews with local residents, the documentary shows footage from around the village.

== Townlands ==
The names of the area's townlands reflect the local history and landscape. Although originally mainly of Irish language origin, many place names Anglicised over time. Local townlands include:

A–B

Annagh: Watery place // Boherbee: The yellow road // Beenateevane: The top of a sloping hill // Balygree: A town in the east of Dysert // Ballybeg: A small town // Bawnaglanna: Head land near a glen // Ballahantourigh: Assembly hill // Blackbriar: Conspicuous and elevated place // Barnfield: The field of the white marsh or hill // Ballymacdonnel: Town of MacDonnell // Ballindrohid: Townland at the bridge

C–D

Clashganniv: Hollow of the sand // Currow Ross: The little wood at the rounded hill // Currow City: // Clounclough: The meadow of the limestone // Clouncurrig: Pasture land, between two woods // Cloonacrrrig: The marshy place // Corraknockaun: Generally a marsh // Dysert: A desert or hermitage // Dicksgrove: Dick Meredith's grove // Tír na gCuas : Country of the caves // Dromulton: The ridge of the weathers // Droumrue: Red ridge

E–H

Farran: Land, field, territory country // Farrandoctor: A dear profitless spot of land Áitin daor docht // Farranmanach: The strangers plot // Farrankeal: A narrow stream // Glounlea: The grey glen // Gortalea: The field at the side of the hill // Glounbawn: The white glen // Gortacnach: The field of the hill // Garraundarragh: The grove of the oak trees // Gloundaeigh: Ravens glen The glen of the two ravens // Gortshanafa: The field of the old hut

I–O

Inchabee: Yellow inch // Inchincummer: Ravine valley The inch at the valley // Kilcow: Cuckoo wood // Killeentierna: The church of Tighernagh // Kilfeilim: The church of Feidhlim // Kilfalney: The church of the robe // Knockacorrin: The heap of the stones // Kilsarcon: The church of Arcain // Kileen: The little church // Laharn: Half land Townland near Farran // Lisheenbawn: Little white lios or fort // Lissataggle: The fort of the rye // Loughnagore: Loch na gCór; Loch : A Lake Corr: Bird of the crane or heron kind // Lyre: Harp // Meanus: Mine

P–Z

Parknamulloge:The field of the skulls, lumpy Place, small height // Powell's Road: // Parknasmuttane: The field of the block or scraps of wood // Parkmore: The big field // Rossanean: The home by the birds // Ranaleen: Fort by the pool, pond or lake // Ranalough: The fort of the lake // Sandville: // Shanavullen: The old mill // Slieveenagh: // Springmount: Cnocearagh // Threegeeves: The amount of land a man could plough in a day // Urroghal: Cockle weed land

== Community and culture ==
Sporting organisations in the area include the Gaelic Athletic Association (GAA) club, Currow GAA, which has its grounds to the east of the village. Currow is also home to St. Bridget's Basketball Club, Community Games, Currow Cycling Club and Currow Gun Club. Several of these are based in the community centre. Several clubs have adopted the same black and amber colours used by the GAA club.

Currow has a Tidy Towns Organisation as well as a rural development group. Currow also has groups attached to the Roman Catholic Church which is in the Killeentierna Parish under the Diocese of Kerry. There is also a parish youth organisation; Killeentierna Youth Club.

The village is located in a cultural area known as Sliabh Luachra. This area is known for its style of traditional Irish music.

== Places of interest ==
=== Meredith Estate ===
The Herberts were the first British family to settle in Currow during the plantations. The Merediths came to Currow in 1635 and bought some of the Herbert Estate. They were originally silversmiths. They built a stately home close to the village, now named after Richard Meredith, Dicksgrove, much of which still remains today, particularly the main house, gate lodges, and the estate walls which now run along a section of the R561. The Meredith mansion was burned out in 1932. In 1935 the Land Commission took over the estate lands. Currow GAA grounds are now located on the estate grounds.

=== Currow Wildlife Park ===
A pond and wildlife sanctuary has been created to the east of the village. Much work was carried out here by local development groups and work included the raising of water levels and landscaping. The area is now home to several species such as the moorhen, mute swan and mallard. A walk and seating area is also provided.

=== Brown Flesk River ===
Currow is situated on the Brown Flesk River (An Fhleisc Rua), a tributary of the River Maine. This river is designated a salmonid river under the EU Freshwater Fish Directive and is a productive angling river with high quality spawning and nursery grounds. This designation aims to protect and improve the quality of fresh waters that support certain species of fish.

Crossings on the river include the "Metal Bridge", which was built in the early 1930s in the townland of Ballybeg. All work on the bridge was done by pick and shovel and the bridge was made from concrete on dry land. A new channel was then dug out which diverted the waters. The "Metal Bridge" name derives from a previous footbridge that was built of iron during the famine years. Non-pedestrian traffic crossed the river at a nearby fording point. The road on which it stands is called Bóthar na Míne or "Road of Meal" as the men who built it were paid in meal rather than money. There was a flood in 1941, which swept away one of the bridge's arches. It has since been restored.

Another nearby bridge, Reidy Bridge, is located in the village beside Dicksgrove Gate Lodge. It was named after the parish priest who served in Currow at the time of construction in 1941. It replaced a bridge that was also swept away in the 1941 flood.

== People ==
- Mick Doyle – International rugby player
- Tommy Doyle – International rugby player
- Mick Galwey – International rugby player
- JJ Hanrahan – International rugby player
- Moss Keane – International rugby player
- Seán McCarthy – International rugby player
- Séamus Scanlon – Inter-county footballer
