= Mick Galwey =

Irish rugby union player

- Born: Michael Joseph Galwey; 8 October 1966 (age 60) Currow, County Kerry, Ireland
- Height: 1.93 m (6 ft 4 in)
- Weight: 115 kg (18.1 st; 254 lb)
- Notable relative: Seán McCarthy (nephew)

Rugby union career
- Position: Lock
Amateur team(s)
Years	Team	Apps	(Points)
	Shannon	113	(140)
Senior career
Years	Team	Apps	(Points)
1987–2003	Munster	130	(85)
- Correct as of 4 December 2011
International career
Years	Team	Apps	(Points)
1991–2002	Ireland	41	(15)
1993	Lions	0	(0)
1993	Ireland 7s		
- Correct as of 4 December 2011

Michael Joseph Galwey (born 8 October 1966) is an Irish former Rugby Union Player. Galwey won an All-Ireland Senior Football Championship with the Kerry Gaelic football team in 1986, as a 19-year-old, before turning to rugby union. He is thus the only winner of an "All-Ireland" in both rugby union and Gaelic football. He also holds County Championship medals in Senior, Junior and Minor grades. His nickname 'Gaillimh' comes from the name of Irish city Galway, in the Irish language.

== Rugby ==
Galwey was a key figure in Shannon R.F.C.'s side during their four in a row winning streak of All- Ireland League titles in the late 1990s. Throughout his career Galwey proved to be a leader who could inspire and motivate players around him to punch above their collective weights. Galwey instilled a "don't panic" and professional attitude in his Shannon team which later would become the hallmarks of Munster Rugby during his tenancy as captain. Galwey is seen as a legend of the sport in his native Munster, particularly in Limerick.

Galwey's involvement in the Irish national squad was more of a mixed bag. Making his debut in 1991 against France, Galwey's 11-year international career was rarely without controversy. Owing to the selection decisions of various national coaches and selectors, Galwey became the most dropped player in international history. He fought his way back onto the Irish squad, becoming the team's captain ten years after he made his debut. In the 1993 Five Nations Championship match against England, Galwey rounded off a fine display in the 17–3 defeat by scoring the only try of the game. His efforts were rewarded later that year when he was selected for the Lions tour to New Zealand.

Galwey played for the Ireland national rugby sevens team at the inaugural 1993 Rugby World Cup Sevens.

=== Record ===
Galwey's rugby record includes:

- 41 caps for Ireland, four times as captain and scorer of three tries
- 1993 Lions tour to New Zealand
- 130 caps for Munster, 85 as captain, 1 Celtic League
- 10 Munster senior cups and 6 All Ireland Leagues with Shannon R.F.C.
- 113 games for Shannon in the All-Ireland League, scoring 28 tries

He has coached Shannon to 2 All-Ireland League victories and 2 Munster Senior Cups.

== Gaelic football ==
Mick Galwey
Personal information
- Born: 8 October 1966 (age 60) County Kerry, Ireland

Sport
- Sport: Gaelic football
- Position: Midfield
Club
- Years: Club
- 1980s–1990s: Currow
Club titles
- Kerry titles: 1
Inter-county
Years	County	Apps (scores)
1986–89	Kerry	2 (0-00)
Inter-county titles
- Munster titles: 1
- All-Irelands: 1
- All Stars: 0

Before becoming a rugby player Galway played Gaelic football with Kerry. His first success at intercounty level came in 1986 when he was part of the Kerry team that won that year's All Ireland, Galway played in the semi-final win over Meath. The following year he won a Munster Under 21 Championship medal and later played in the All Ireland final but his side lost out to Donegal. In 1989 he played his second and last championship game with Kerry in the Munster Championship first round win over Limerick a game that he also captained the side in.

At club level he played with his local Currow club. The club has produced 3 other senior Irish Rugby Internationals Moss Keane, Mick Doyle and Tommy Doyle, an All Ireland Minor winner in 1962, along with an U-20 Irish Rugby International, JJ Hanrahan. He played a key part in helping Currow win their first Kerry Junior Football Championship in 1988 when they beat Rathmore in the final.

He also played with the St.Kieran's divisional team. In 1988 he helped them to win their first and to date only Kerry Senior Football Championship title.

== See also ==
- List of players who have converted from one football code to another

Sporting positions
Preceded by Pat Spillane	Kerry Senior Football Captain; 1989	Succeeded by Charlie Nelligan
