= Lordship of Molahiffe =

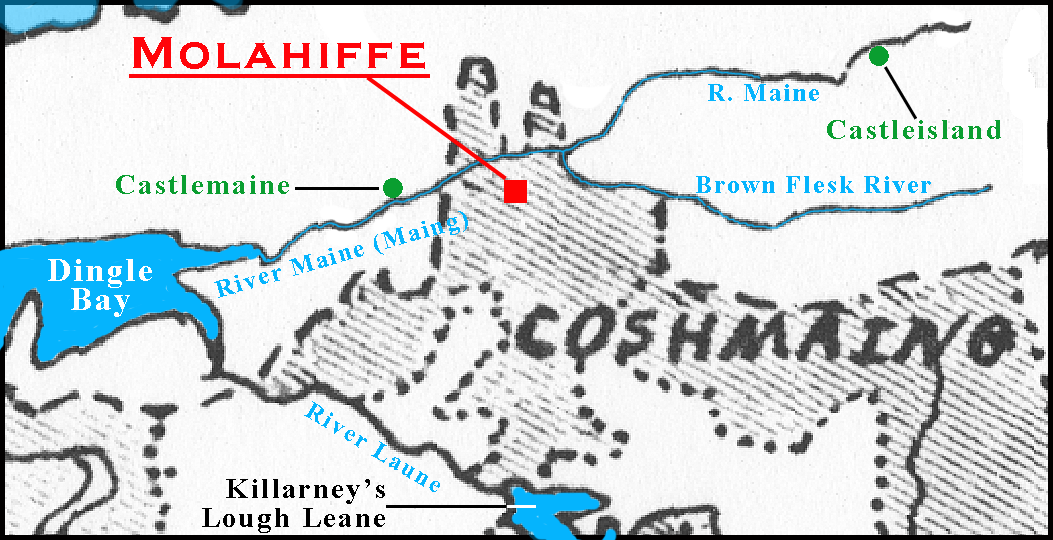
Map of 14th century location of the Lordship of Molahiffe, in present-day County Kerry, Ireland. Adapted from: W.F. Butler; "Pedigree and Succession of the House of MacCarthy Mór, With a Map'"; Journal of the Royal Society of Antiquaries of Ireland; Vol. 51, May 1920.

The Gaelic-Irish Lordship of Molahiffe (Irish: Magh ui Fhlaithimh) was created in the 14th century by Eóghan (Owen) Mór MacCarthy, Lord of Coshmaing, as a grant to his son, Donal. Molahiffe Castle was also the seat of The Paramount Lordship of Cosmaigne (Ard Tiarnas na Coshmaing). The Gaelic title, Lord (Tiarna/Baron) of Molahiffe (in legalese, an incorporeal hereditament), should not be confused with the Baronetcy of Molahiffe, which was an English title held by some of the Browne family (Earls of Kenmare) after they took possession of former MacCarthy lands at the beginning of the seventeenth century. Alternate spellings of Molahiffe include "Mullahiffe," and, "Moylahiffe."

== Location ==
The area of the original Lordship of Molahiffe was within the territory of the Paramount Lordship of Cosmaigne/Coshmaing (specifically, the area known as East Cosmaigne), and descended from the original appanage of Sliocht Eóghan na Coshmaing. Although, in the present day, no territory attaches to the title of Lord (Baron) of Molahiffe, it was, in the 14th-century, located in the Kingdom of Desmond, in modern-day County Kerry, Barony of Magunihy. The northern boundary of the Lordship of Molahiffe (as well as the Kingdom of Desmond, Coshmaing, and the Barony of Magunihy) was the River Maine, which flows into Dingle Bay at Castlemaine Harbor. However, as Butler notes, "The two projections of the barony to the north of the Maine are in Molahiffe...." (see map). The area of Molahiffe projecting to the north of the River Maine (Maing) extended to the ridgeline of the Slieve Mish mountain range, which partly bisects the Dingle Peninsula.

== Devolution of the Title ==
Among the cadet lines of the original Sliocht Eóghan of Coshmaing, only the male line of what is believed to be the Molahiffe branch descended into the 19th century. The last known possible claimant to the Molahiffe title was Brig. Gen. Sir Charles MacCarthy, who died (without issue) in an 1824 battle with the Ashantis, in Sierra Leone, Africa.

Under Gaelic-Irish Brehon law, a title granted by a noble house re-vests in the house of the overlordship when the male line of the title-holder becomes extinct. Thus, the title of the Lord (Tiarna) of Molahiffe re-vested, as of 1824, with the Paramount Lordship of Cosmaigne, which, in turn, is dependant from the Royal House of MacCarthy Mór.
