= Firies =

Village in County Kerry, Ireland

Firies Na Foidhrí (Irish)
- Village
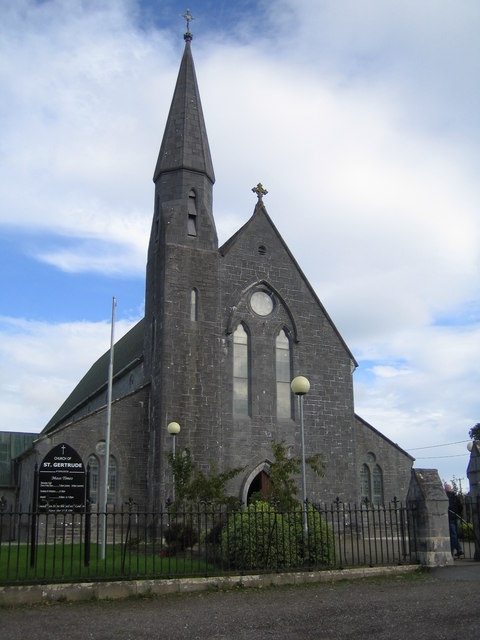
- Church of St Gertrude

- Location in Ireland
- Coordinates: 52°10′14″N 09°35′52″W
- Country: Ireland
- Province: Munster
- County: County Kerry

Population (2022)
  - Total: 573

Firies (/ˈfaɪ.əriːz/ officially Fieries; Irish: Na Foidhrí) is a village in County Kerry, Ireland. It is situated midway between the hub towns of Killarney (14.5 km), Tralee (16 km), Castleisland (16 km) and Killorglin (13 km). The village is on the R561 road between Farranfore and Castlemaine. The population at the 2022 census was 573. There are two principal rivers, the Maine and its chief tributary, the Brown Flesk.

== History ==
Evidence of ancient settlement in the area includes a number of ring fort, enclosure and holy well sites in the townlands of Firies and Killahane.

In Firies townland, on a rock outcrop approximately 850 meters south of the village, are the remains of a rectangular tower known as Firies (or Fieries) Castle. The ground-floor appears to be occupied by a single chamber which was covered by a rounded vault which is almost entirely fallen. Only part of the walling above ground-floor level survives. This tower house was built by the O'Connors. It is in the townland of Firies, in the parish of Firies, in the barony of Magunihy. It was built in the thirteenth century and it was knocked in the sixteenth century. The small castle has been in ruin for over two hundred years. A number of woods flourished for miles around it. It is from these woods that Firies got its name.

Saint Gertrude's Catholic Church, in Killahane townland, was built c. 1860.

The village is in the historical barony of Magunihy.

== Education ==
In 1991, Firies National School moved to a new location beside the church. It is a rural school with, as of 2024, 19 teachers and 8 special needs assistants. As of January 2024, there were over 270 pupils enrolled. The school is involved in the Green Schools Initiative, Discovery Science and the Aistear Programmes.

== Notable people ==
- Eamonn Casey (1927–2017), Catholic prelate who was bishop of Galway and Kilmacduagh from 1976 to 1992, was born in Firies.
- Donal Daly, former Gaelic footballer.
- Jack Sherwood, former Gaelic footballer.

== See also ==
- Ballyhar
