= Terence Francis MacCarthy =

Northern Irish genealogist, historian and title claimant (born 1957)

- Born: 21 January 1957 (age 69); Belfast, Northern Ireland

Terence Francis MacCarthy (born 21 January 1957), formerly self-styled Tadhg V, The MacCarthy Mór, Prince of Desmond and Lord of Kerslawny, is a writer, best known for being a pretender to the Irish chiefly title of MacCarthy Mór. He was born in Belfast, Northern Ireland. His last name is sometimes published as McCarthy.

In 1992, having presented falsified documentation regarding his ancestry for official perusal, MacCarthy gained Chief of the Name recognition as the MacCarthy Mór. He worked to organise an affiliation of clan associations in Ireland and North America, building on heritage tourism. He also became active in the International Commission on Orders of Chivalry (ICOC), in which position he promoted an order known as the Niadh Nask. His claims were challenged in 1999 by The Sunday Times, which had conducted an investigation of his ancestry and found that his father was an ordinary working man in Belfast. Later that year, recognition of MacCarthy was withdrawn and he resigned the title; in 2003 the government discontinued the practice of granting courtesy honours to claimed chiefs of the name of Irish families.

== MacCarthy Mór ==
On 28 January 1992, the Irish Genealogical Office conferred courtesy chief of the name recognition to Terence MacCarthy as the MacCarthy Mór, the title of the chief of the MacCarthy sept or clan. The title literally means "the great MacCarthy". The MacCarthys had been princes of Desmond, and earlier, through the Eoghanacht of Cashel, the kings of Munster.

MacCarthy claimed the title based on tanistry rather than primogeniture, and said that his father renounced the title in his favour in 1980. He led an affiliation of MacCarthy clan associations in Ireland, Canada, and the United States, which appealed to heritage tourism trends of the time. MacCarthy instituted a quasi-chivalric order, the Niadh Nask, and conferred titles of nobility on his supporters.

In the early 1990s, MacCarthy joined the International Commission on Orders of Chivalry (ICOC), an organisation whose stated purpose is to examine orders of chivalry to determine their legitimacy. By 1996, he was vice-president under the ICOC's founder and president, Robert Gayre. Gayre and MacCarthy used the ICOC's influence to promote the claimed legitimacy of the Niadh Nask, and MacCarthy's fraudulent nobiliary claims. At the same time, Gayre served as MacCarthy's "constable" in the Niadh Nask. The other eight members of the Board of the ICOC in 1996 included Patrick O'Kelly, who claimed to be "Baron O'Kelly de Conejera"; and six others who were members of the Niadh Nask. The ICOC's register listed its vice-president matter-of-factly as "The MacCarthy Mór, Prince of Desmond".

In 1996, Robert Gayre died and Terence MacCarthy assumed his position as president of the ICOC. For the next three years, he continued to use its offices, influence, and publications to lend credence to his nobiliary claims.

== Controversy ==
After Barry Trant McCarthy wrote to the Chief Herald in 1997 questioning the existence of a Belfast branch of the McCarthy family, Gorry Research was employed by the Genealogical Office to produce a report reviewing McCarthy's documentation. This report, submitted as "On the Pedigree of Mr Terence McCarthy of Belfast" in March 1999, identified significant errors and inconsistencies in the documentation.

On 20 June 1999, The Sunday Times in Dublin published an article questioning both the facts of MacCarthy's particular application of tanistry, and his claim of descent from former chiefs of the MacCarthy clan. Various public statements on both sides were released over the next few months. His critics, pointing to his falsified ancestry, alleged that he was an impostor who misused his genealogical skills to fraudulently claim the title, then exploited it for personal financial gain and aggrandisement. His supporters argued that a culturally inappropriate and impossibly stringent standard was applied to MacCarthy's pedigree. They also claimed that MacCarthy was being singled out because of "jealousy of his success".

Investigation of the case was rendered more difficult due to the refusal of the Genealogical Office to release all documents relating to the 1992 courtesy recognition. The Irish Freedom of Information Act of 1997 does not apply retrospectively, but documents relating to the case from April 1998 onwards were released. Sean J. Murphy, a County Wicklow genealogist, has published online accounts of the MacCarthy Mór case and also a full-length book.

Media reported on research showing that MacCarthy's claim to be the MacCarthy Mór was based on fabricated documentation; rather than being aristocrats of Munster origin, his ancestors were ordinary Belfast working people. Furthermore, the surname of MacCarthy's paternal grandfather Thomas is listed on his birth certificate as "MacCartney", rather than the expected "MacCarthy".

On a practical level, the issue was settled by two events. In August 1999, the Irish Genealogical Office nullified its previous recognition of Terence MacCarthy as the MacCarthy Mór. A group of twelve principal supporters met in Atlanta, Georgia, US, on 4 September 1999. The notes of this meeting and key concerns voiced were transmitted to Terence MacCarthy in Tangier on 8 September. Following a report to the group by historian Peter Berresford Ellis, who was given access to the files at the Genealogical Office in Dublin and who was “devastated” by the inadequacy of the pedigree evidence therein contained, an ultimatum demanding he produce the evidence lacking for his claim to the chiefship was transmitted to MacCarthy in Tangier by the "Atlanta Group" on 2 October. On 9 October 1999, after making no substantive answer to the "Atlanta Group", and thus losing the support of the Niadh Nask, MacCarthy "abdicated" the title. Barry Trant-McCarthy, a resident of England, applied for recognition under the title, but the Genealogical Office never made a decision on the matter. In July 2003, the government decided to discontinue the practice of granting courtesy recognition to chiefs of the name.

== See also ==
- Sliocht Cormaic of Dunguile, sept of the MacCarthy dynasty into whose pedigree Terence MacCarthy inserted himself

== Sources ==
- McCarthy, Pete (2004) The Road to McCarthy: Around the World in Search of Ireland. London; New York: Fourth Estate; ISBN 000716212X.
- Murphy, Sean J. (2004) Twilight of the Chiefs: The Mac Carthy Mór Hoax. Bethesda, Maryland: Academica Press; ISBN 1930901437.
