= Kingdom of Desmond =

Kingdom in southwest Ireland (1118–1596)

Kingdom of Desmond Deasmhumhain
- 1118–1596
- The Mac Cárthaigh as leaders of the Eóganacht Chaisil provided the kings of Desmond.

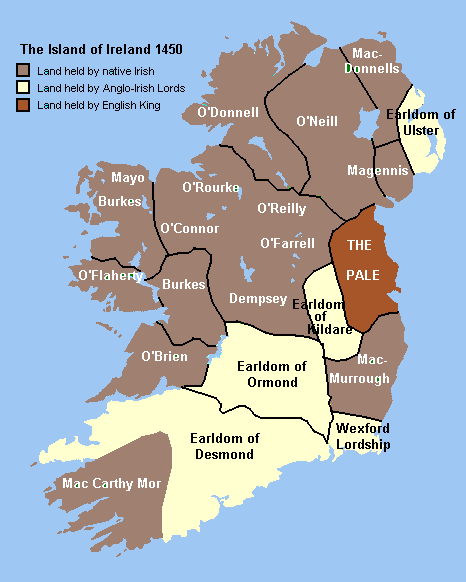
- A map featuring a much reduced Desmond in 1450, marked as MacCarthy Mór.
- Capital: Killarney, Lough Leane and Cahersiveen
- Common languages: Middle Irish, Early Modern Irish, Latin
- Religion: Catholic Christianity; Gaelic tradition
- Government: Tanistry
- King / Prince
  - 1118–1123: Tadhg Mac Cárthaigh
  - 1558–1596: Domhnall Mac Cárthaigh
- History
  - Established: 1118
  - Disestablished: 1596
Preceded by
| Kingdom of Munster |
Succeeded by
| Kingdom of Carbery |
| Earldom of Desmond |
| Kingdom of Ireland |
- Today part of: Ireland

The Kingdom of Desmond (Irish: Deasmhumhain, meaning 'South Munster') was a historic kingdom in southwestern Ireland. It was founded in 1118 by Tadhg Mac Cárthaigh, King of Munster, when the Treaty of Glanmire formally divided the Kingdom of Munster into Desmond and Thomond (Tuadh-Mhumhain, "North Munster"). It comprised all of what is now County Cork and most of County Kerry. Desmond was ruled by the Mac Cárthaigh (MacCarthy) dynasty. Other clans within the kingdom included the O'Sullivans and O'Donovans. Following the Norman invasion of Ireland in the late 12th century, the eastern half of Desmond was conquered by the Anglo-Normans and became the Earldom of Desmond, ruled by the Fitzmaurices and FitzGeralds—the famous Irish family known as the Geraldines. The king of Desmond, Diarmaid Mac Cárthaigh submitted to Henry II of England, but the western half of Desmond lived on as a semi-independent Gaelic kingdom. It was often at war with the Anglo-Normans. Fínghin Mac Carthaigh's victory over the Anglo-Normans at the Battle of Callann (1261) helped preserve Desmond's independence. The kings of Desmond founded sites such as Blarney Castle, Ballycarbery Castle, Muckross Abbey and Kilcrea Friary. Following the Nine Years' War of the 1590s, Desmond became part of the Kingdom of Ireland.

== MacCarthy Mórs: Kings of Desmond ==
From its inception in 1118 through 1596, the Kingdom of Desmond was ruled by the family of the MacCarthy Mór (i.e., the "Great MacCarthy"). For centuries the MacCarthy Mórs reigned as Kings of Desmond, and maintained significant demesne lands (manors) throughout the kingdom. Principal seats were at Pallis Castle (near present-day Killarney), Castle Lough (on Killarney's Lough Leane), and Ballycarbery Castle (near Cahersiveen on the Ring of Kerry).

After the death of King Donal IX MacCarthy Mór in 1596, and following the effective end of the Gaelic Order after the Battle of Kinsale (1602), the former Kingdom of Desmond was partitioned between County Cork and County Kerry (in 1606).

Subsequent to the end of the MacCarthy Mór sovereignty in Desmond, descendants entitled to the highest Gaelic designation of "Chief of the Name" of the MacCarthy Mór family, are also properly styled as Princes of Desmond. A secondary title of the MacCarthy Mór would derive from the lordship designation of his sept.

== Principalities and other septs ==
Generational offshoots (cadet family lines) of the Royal House of Desmond received their own territories and titles – known as appanages of the royal house. Those MacCarthy Mór cadet branches which did not evolve to the MacCarthy Mór chief-of-the-name status, became chiefs-of-the-name of their own princely septs, i.e. MacCarthy Reagh of Carbery, MacCarthy of Muskerry, and MacDonough MacCarthy of Duhallow.

Because of their location, it was the MacCarthys of Muskerry and Carbery who ended up fighting the majority of the battles against the Normans – mainly the FitzGerald Earls of Desmond – while defending and expanding the Gaelic realms. By the mid-sixteenth century, the main line of the MacCarthys Mor had largely withdrawn to Kerry, so any modern claims that they are still entitled to the nominal overlordship of Carbery and Muskerry might be rejected by any extant descendants of these branches.

=== Carbery ===
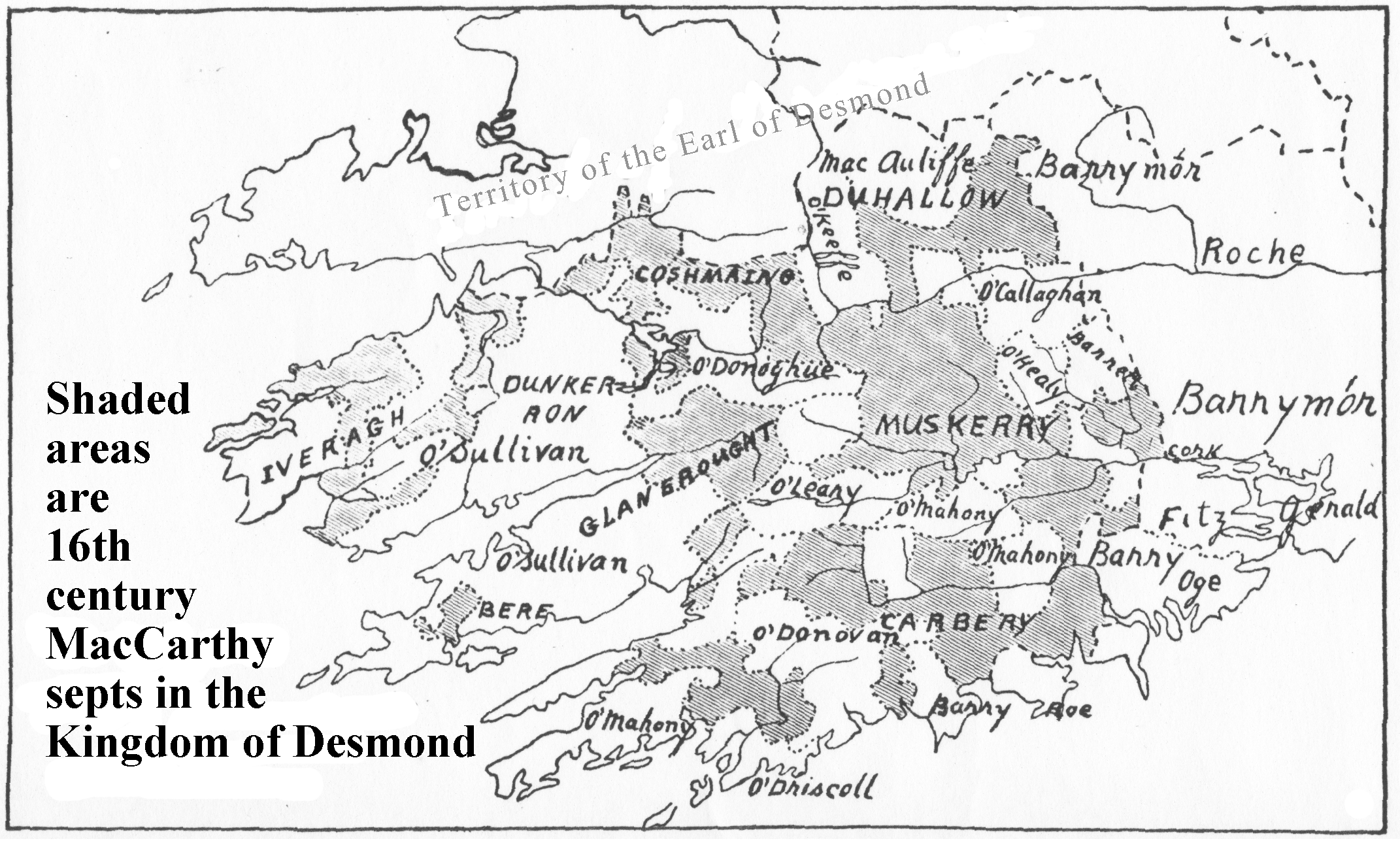
Map adapted from: W. F. Butler; "Pedigree and Succession of the House of MacCarthy Mór, With a Map"

One of three principalities within the original Kingdom of Desmond, Carbery, under the MacCarthy Reagh dynasty founded by Donal Gott MacCarthy in the mid-13th century, achieved independence from the overlordship of the MacCarthy Mórs of Desmond. Thus, the MacCarthy territories were actually over a fourth again greater outside of Desmond proper, due to the independent and considerable principality of Carbery, directly to the south/southeast of Desmond.

Principal seats of the Lords/Princes of Carbery were at Kilbrittain Castle (near Kinsale in County Cork), as well as Timoleague Castle (west of Kinsale). Possession of the latter was frequently in dispute with the Norman family of Barry, who were also prominent in West Cork. Some of the more notable sub-lordships under the MacCarthy Reagh dynasty of Carbery included castles at Ballydehob, Benduff, Downeen, Kilcoe, and Kilgobbin, to name but a few.

=== Muskerry ===
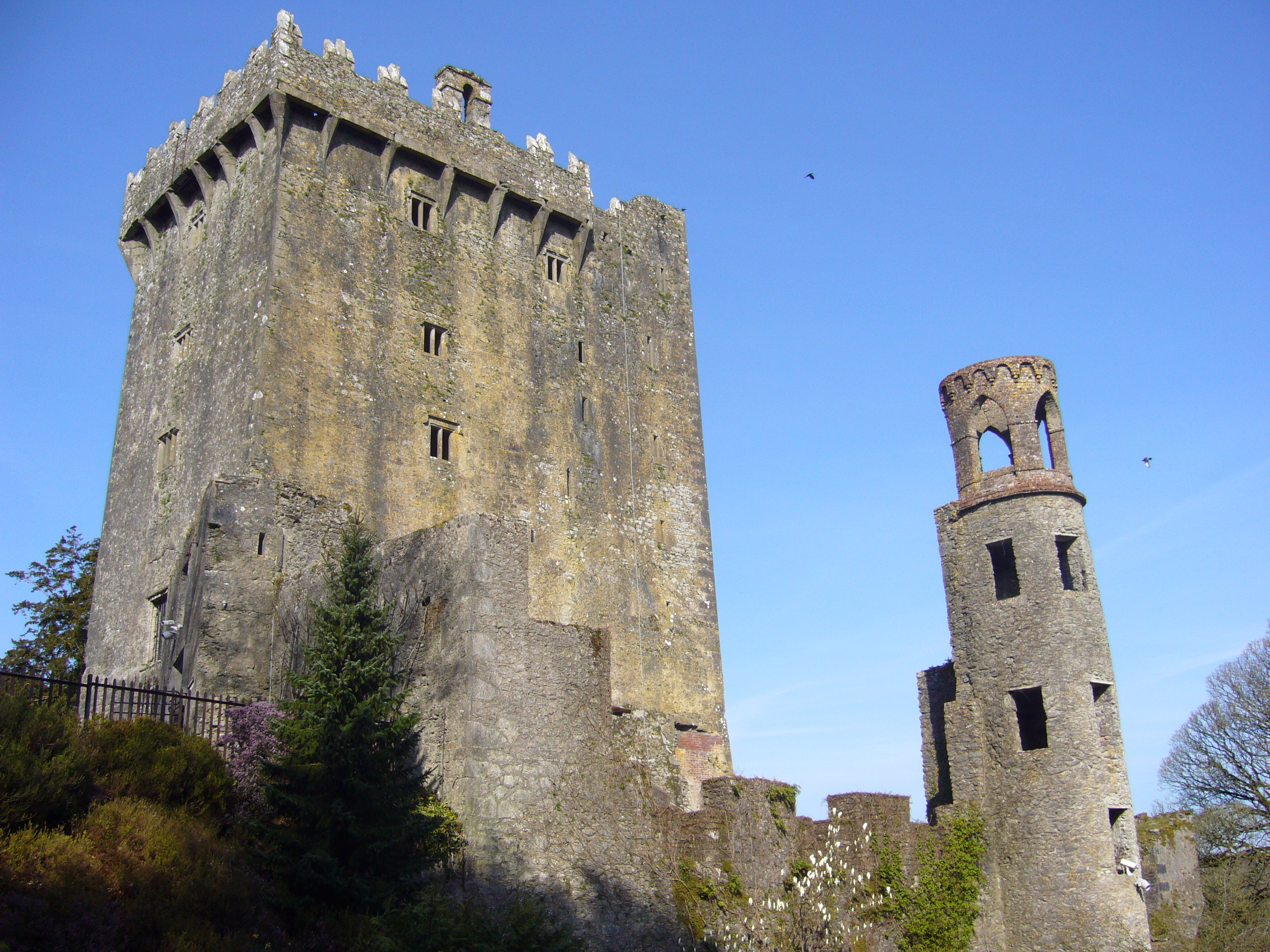
Blarney Castle

The MacCarthys of Muskerry, on the other hand, derived more recently from the MacCarthys Mór, and so were (and still are) considered a sept of the main dynasty. This principality of the Kingdom of Desmond began in the 14th century as an appanage of King Cormac Mór MacCarthy Mór (d. 1359) for his second son, Dermod. At various times, because of their adeptness at playing the political game with England, the Lords/Princes of Muskerry also bore various British titles, such as Earl of Clancarty, Viscount Mountcashel, and Baron (Lord) of Blarney.

From its rebuilding in the late 15th century by Cormac Laidir MacCarthy, Blarney Castle, near to Cork city, was the principal seat of the MacCarthys of Muskerry. It was from alleged dialogue between Cormac Teige MacCarthy, the Lord of Blarney, and Queen Elizabeth I of England, that the term "blarney" was coined to mean "empty flattery" or "beguiling talk." It is also from Blarney Castle that the legend of "kissing the Blarney Stone" derives.

Among the numerous sub-infeudations/sub-lordships within the overlordship of the Princes of Muskerry, some of the major ones were: Ballea, Carrignamuck, Carrignavar, Castlecormac, Cloghroe, Cloghphillip, and Downyne.

=== Duhallow ===
The third of the princely lines that began as appanages of the MacCarthy Mór dynasty was that of the MacCarthys of Duhallow (Irish: Dúiche Ealla), known as the MacDonough MacCarthys. The Duhallow sept began in the 13th century as an appanage from the then-King of Desmond, Cormac Fionn MacCarthy Mór (r. 1244–1248), to his son Diarmuid (Dermond). It was the Gaelic lordship(s) of Duhallow (and Coshmaing) that occupied the northern frontier of the MacCarthys of Desmond in their sometime struggles with the Norman family of the FitzGeralds, the Earls of Desmond. The principal seat of the Lords of Duhallow was at Kanturk. The family of the MacDonough MacCarthy Lords/Princes of Duhallow became extinct in the 18th century.

As in the other princely appanages of Carbery and Muskerry, Duhallow held overlordship of a number of septs of both comital (ard tiarna) rank – Clanawly, Clonmeen, and Dromagh – as well as baronial (tiarna) rank – e.g., Cappagh, Dromiscane, Kanturk, Kilbolane, Knocktemple, and Lohort, among others.

=== Other septs ===
==== Coshmaing ====
The sept (clan) of Sliocht Eoghan of Coshmaing ("beside the River Maine") was established in the 14th century by King Cormac Mór MacCarthy Mór (d. 1359) for his third son, Eoghan, as an appanage of the royal house of Desmond. According to Butler, "Of the MacCarthy septs in the Barony of Magunihy, by far the most (88 to 105 ploughlands) was the Sliocht Eoghain Mhoir of Cois Mainge…. The lands of this sept stretched along the whole northern frontier of Magunihy from a point near Castlemaine to the border of Cork."

The head of Sliocht Eoghan of Coshmaing was styled as Lord (Ard Tiarna) of Coshmaing (English: Cosmaigne). The principal seat of the Coshmaing lordship was at Molahiffe, with other castles (sub-lordships) at Fieries and Clonmeallane.

==== Non-MacCarthy septs ====
Both inside and outside the territories of the Kingdom of Desmond in southwestern Ireland, there were many families other than the various septs of the MacCarthys. Most prominent of the Norman families in the area were the FitzGeralds (Earls of Desmond), FitzMaurices, Barrys, Barretts, and Roches.

The chief non-MacCarthy Gaelic princes under the MacCarthy Mórs in Desmond were the O'Sullivans. After them were the O'Donoghues, and these two were the only septs who took part in the performance of the MacCarthy inauguration ceremonies – i.e., the bestowal of the White Wand. Also prominent were the O'Callaghans, O'Keeffes, McAuliffes, O'Sheas, [O'Fearris, /O'Fearguis] and others.

Within Carbery, aside from the MacCarthy Reaghs, the most prominent Gaelic families were the princely sept of the O'Donovans, the O'Mahonys, O'Driscolls, O'Dalys, and O'Crowleys. Within Muskerry, prominent non-MacCarthy Gaelic families included the MacSweeneys, O'Learys, O'Spaelains, O'Healys, and O'Riordans.

== See also ==
- Sliocht Cormaic of Dunguile
- Earl of Clancarty
- Lordship of Ireland

== General references ==
- Butler, W. F. T., Gleaning from Irish History. Longman, Green & Co. 1925.
- Ellis, Peter Berresford, Erin's Blood Royal: The Gaelic Noble Dynasties of Ireland. Palgrave. Revised edition, 2002.
- MacCarthy Glas, Daniel, The Life and Letters of Florence MacCarthy. 1867.
- MacCarthy, Samuel Trant, The MacCarthys of Munster. 1922.
- O'Donovan, John (ed. and tr.), Annála Ríoghachta Éireann. Annals of the Kingdom of Ireland by the Four Masters. 7 vols. Royal Irish Academy. Dublin. 1848–51. 2nd edition, 1856.
- O'Hart, John, Irish Pedigrees. Dublin. 5th edition, 1892.
- Ó hInnse, Séamus (ed. and tr.) and Florence MacCarthy, Mac Carthaigh's Book, or Miscellaneous Irish Annals (A.D. 1114–1437). Dublin Institute for Advanced Studies. 1947.
- O'Keeffe, Eugene (ed. and tr.), Eoganacht Genealogies from the Book of Munster. Cork. 1703. available here
- Ó Murchadha, Diarmuid, "The Battle of Callan, A.D. 1261", in Journal of the Cork Historical and Archaeological Society, Vol. LXVI, No. 204. July–December 1961. pp. 105–116.
- Ó Murchadha, Diarmuid, Family Names of County Cork. Cork: The Collins Press. 2nd edition, 1996.
