= Lordship of Coshmaing =

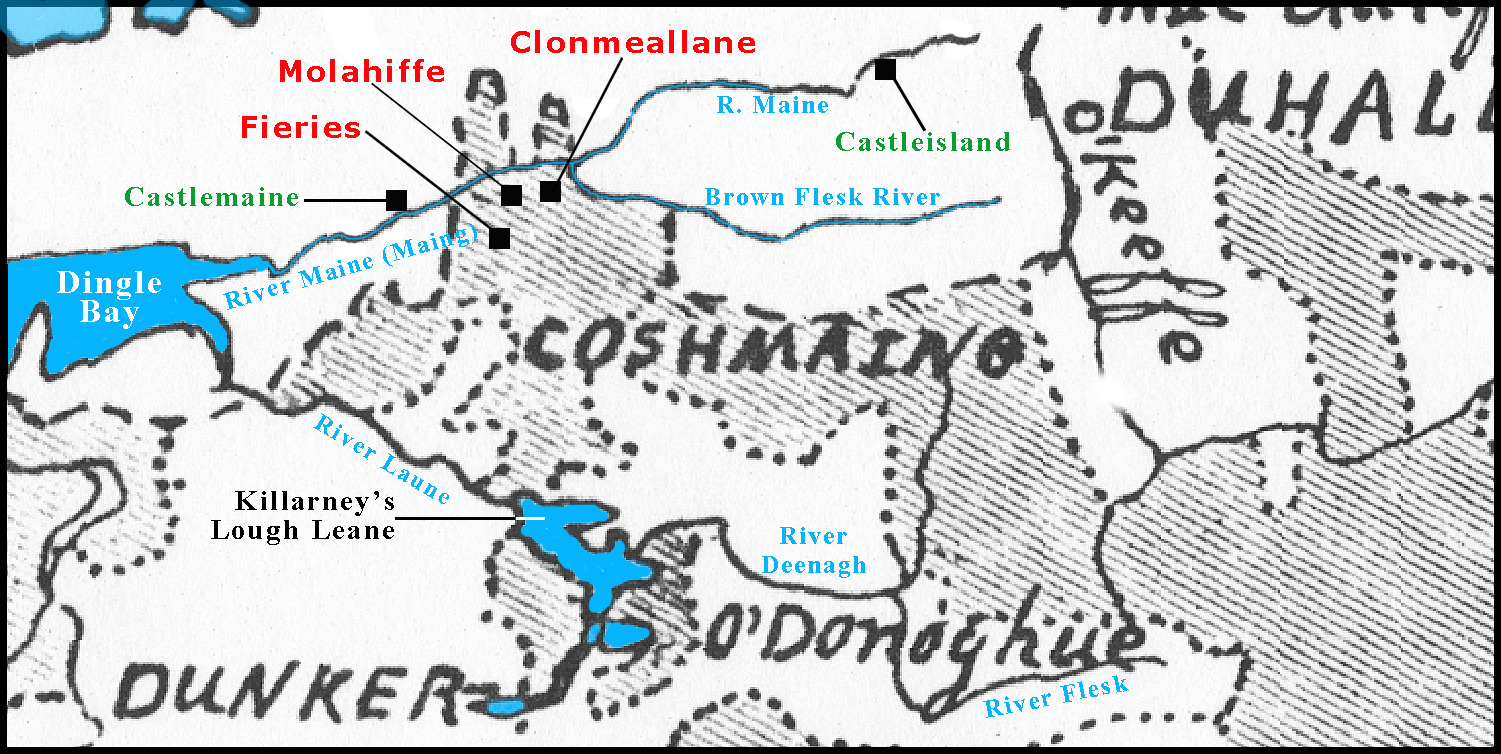
Map of 16th century territory of the Lordship of Coshmaing, in present-day Co. Kerry, Ireland. Adapted from: W.F. Butler; "Pedigree and Succession of the House of MacCarthy Mór, With a Map'"; Journal of the Royal Society of Antiquaries of Ireland; Vol. 51, May 1920.

The Lordship of Coshmaing is an historic honorific title associated with the Gaelic nobility of Ireland. The title was created in the 14th century when the then King of Desmond granted an appanage (estate and title) to one of his sons. Like other such titles in Ireland, it no longer has any recognition under the law, and has not been used for several hundred years.

== Background ==
As a republic, the Constitution of Ireland prohibits the conferring of "titles of nobility" by the state. While some titles had obtained "courtesy recognition" by the Chief Herald of Ireland, this practice was discontinued by 2003 when the Attorney General noted that such recognitions were unconstitutional and without basis in law.

As "incorporeal hereditaments", any lands which may have historically related to such a title are long since disassociated from these (now) honorific titles, and such titles no longer attach to any territories.

== History ==
The Lordship of Coshmaing (also spelled variously as "Cosmaigne," "Coshmang," "Cois Mainge," etc.) was created in the 14th century when the King of Desmond, Cormac MacCarthy Mór (d. 1359), granted an appanage to his third son, Eoghan. (His second son, Diarmud, was granted the appanage of the Lordship of Muskerry.) Thus established the family/sept of Sliocht Eoghan (Owen) Mór of Coshmaing, which was located in today's County Kerry, Ireland, Barony of Magunihy, Province of Munster.

Butler described the inception of Coshmaing thus:

Eoghan was given the lordship of Coshmaing. This district stretched from the modern boundary of Cork across the northern and western parts of the barony of Magunihy to close to Castlemaine;

and

The area of Coshmaing according to the Lambeth Survey was twenty-three quarters and a half and a third of a quarter.... Sir William Herbert estimates the area of Coshmaing at 88 ploughlands, and an inquisition of 1634 gives it as 105 ploughlands. Coshmaing was a frontier district, forming a barrier between the lands of the Geraldines and the rest of the Kerry lands of the MacCarthys. In the same way Muskerry formed a frontier barrier to the east, and Duhallow to the north-east against the foreigner.

== Sub-lordships ==
As a "frontier" district, Coshmaing served as a buffer between the MacCarthy territories of Desmond (MacCarthy Mór, MacCarthy Reagh of Carbery, and MacCarthy of Muskerry). It was the northernmost line of MacCarthy defence in the almost-constant conflict with the Norman-Irish family of the Earls of Desmond, the FitzGeralds (Geraldines). The MacCarthys and FitzGeralds, at least once, combined their defences against "new" invaders: the town of Castlemaine (although not technically within the territory of Coshmaing) "takes its name from a castle erected on a bridge over the river Maine by McCarthy More and the Earl of Desmond, as a defence to their frontiers".

The Lordship of Coshmaing is a Paramount lordship, of comital (Count) rank (Gaelic: Ard Tiarna na Cois Mainge). The first Lord of Coshmaing, Eoghan Mór MacCarthy, head of Sliocht Eoghan of Coshmaing, granted sub-lordships to his two sons: Cormac (West Coshmaing) and Donal (East Coshmaing, known as the Lordship of Molahiffe [tiarnas/baronial-rank]). In turn, Cormac's two sons also received grants of sub-lordships (tiarnas) – Donal (Lord of Clonmeallane) and Eoghan/Owen (Lord of Fieries – in Gaelic, foithre, meaning "woods"). The lordships of Molahiffe, Fieries and Clonmeallane each had castles that survived for various tenures up until the Cromwellian Confisacations (ca. 1649–53).

== Devolution of the title ==
In The MacCarthys of Munster, Samuel Trant MacCarthy (Mór) describes the end of the original main line of Coshmaing as follows: "The Calendar of Patent Rolls of Elizabeth, A.D. 1588, mentions Teige MacDermod MacCormac as apparently the last Lord of Coshmang ... slain in a skirmish near Aghadoe (ca. 1581)." Among the cadet lines of the original Sliocht Eoghan of Coshmaing, only the male line of what is believed to be the Molahiffe branch descended into the 19th century. The last known possible claimant to the Coshmaing title was Brig. Gen. Sir Charles MacCarthy, who died (without issue) in an 1824 battle with the Ashantis, in Sierra Leone, Africa.

Under Gaelic-Irish Brehon law, a title granted by a royal/noble house re-vests in the house of the overlordship when the male line of the title-holder becomes extinct. Thus, the title of the Lord (Ard Tiarna) of Coshmaing re-vested with the Royal House of MacCarthy Mór as of 1581, and was never claimed by any of the Coshmaing cadet line descendants of Molahiffe, Fieries, or Clonmeallane. Similarly, as those cadet lines became extinct, their baronial-rank lordship titles re-vested in the overlordship of Coshmaing. When that house became extinct, all of the sub-lordship titles also re-vested in the overlordship of MacCarthy Mór.
