= Ardcanaght Stones =

Pair of ogham stones in County Kerry, Ireland

Ardcanaght Ogham Stones
- Clocha Oghaim Ard Cánachta (Irish)
- Location within Ireland
- 52.169057°N 9.725829°W
- Type: ogham stones
- Location: Ardcanaght, Castlemaine, County Kerry, Ireland

History
- Built: c. AD 300–800

Site notes
- Elevation: 15 m (49 ft)
- Owner: private

National monument of Ireland
- Official name: Ardcannaght
- Reference no.: 430

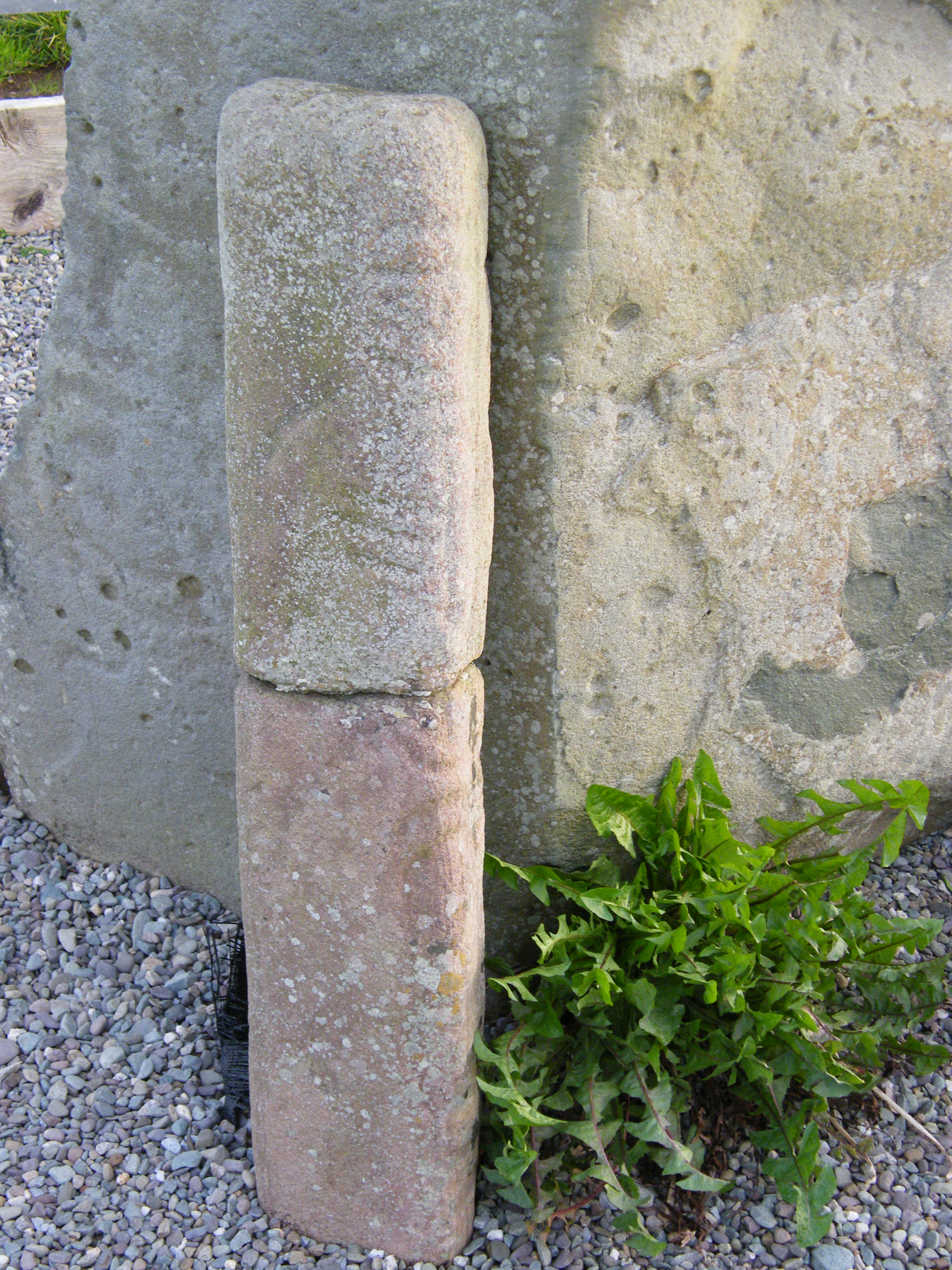
Larger Ardcanaght Ogham Stone

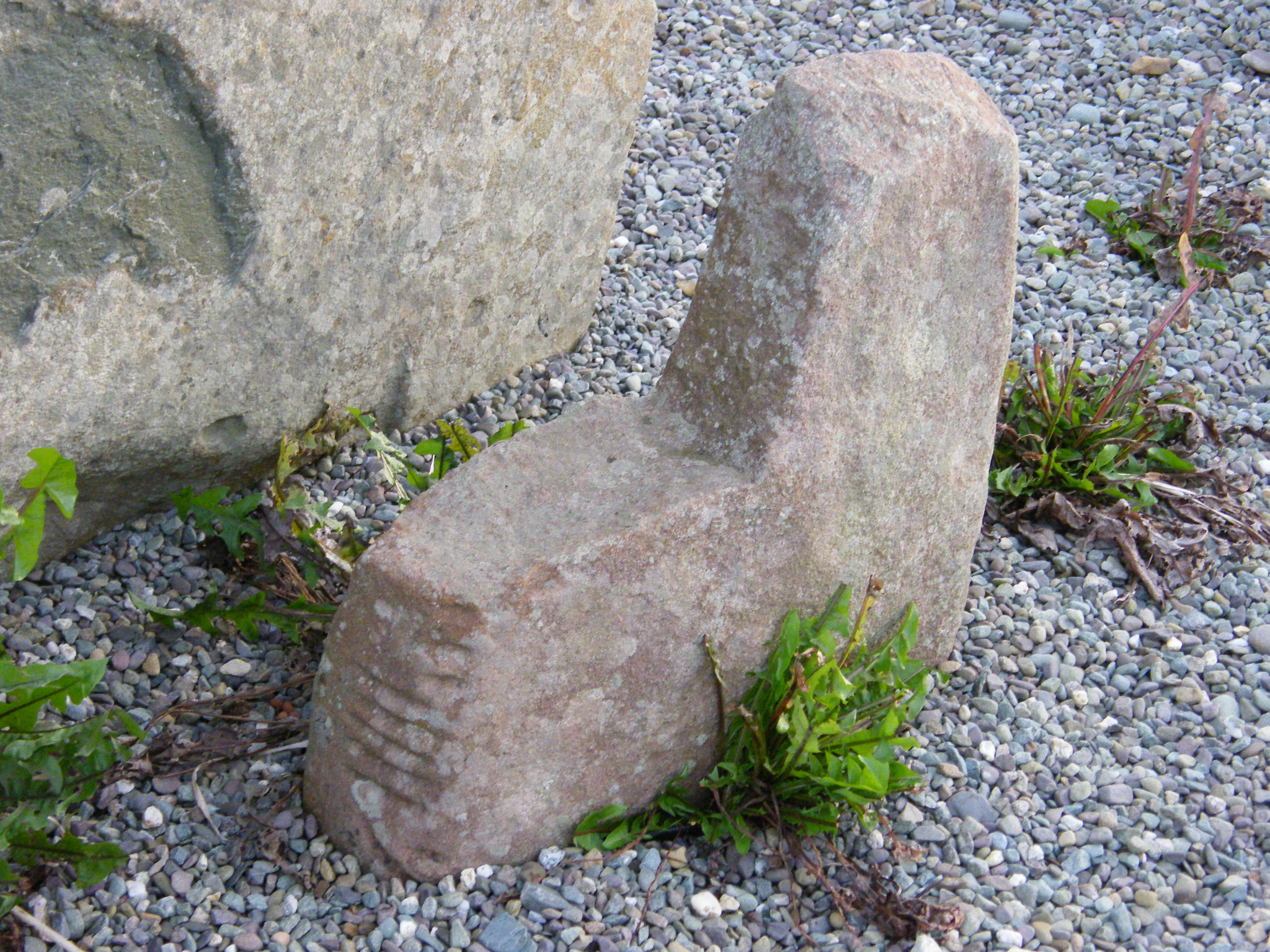
Smaller (broken) Ardcanaght Ogham Stone

The Ardcanaght Stones are a pair of ogham stones (CIIC 246) forming a National Monument located in County Kerry, Ireland.

== Location ==
Ardcanaght Stones are located 1.7 kilometres (1.1 mi) west of Castlemaine, to the north of the River Maine.

== History ==
The inscriptions are too fragmentary to give them a precise date. Ogham carvings were made in Ireland between the 4th and 10th centuries. They were rediscovered in the 1940s and moved here in recent years from a cillín.

== Description ==
The two stones are accompanied by a large standing stone, 1.6 metres (5 feet 3 inches) tall.

The stones are:

- 246a: 90 cm (3.0 ft) tall with the inscription LMCBLTCL LT
- 246b: a small fragment with the inscription V MAQỊ. "MAQI" commonly appears on Ogham inscriptions; it means "son [of]".
