= Lonergan (surname) =

Lonergan is a surname. Notable people with the surname include:

- Andrew Lonergan (born 1983), English football player
- Arthur Lonergan (1906–1989), American art director
- Augustine Lonergan (1874–1947), American politician from Connecticut
- Bernard Lonergan, (1904–1984), Canadian Jesuit priest, philosopher-theologian, economist
- Dan Lonergan, Australian sports commentator and writer
- Dean Lonergan, New Zealand rugby league player and events promoter
- Dylan Lonergan (born 2004), American football player
- Frank J. Lonergan (1882–1961), American politician and judge from Oregon
- Jennifer Lonergan, Canadian educator and nonprofit business executive
- John Lonergan (1839–1902), American Civil War army officer
- John Lonergan (artist) (c. 1895–1969), American visual artist
- Julia Lonergan (born 1961), Australian judge
- Kate Lonergan (born 1962), English actress
- Kenneth Lonergan (born 1962), American playwright, screenwriter, and director
- Lenore Lonergan (1928–1987), actress
- Lloyd Lonergan (1870–1937), American scenario and screenwriter
- Mike Lonergan, American basketball player and coach
- Richard Lonergan (1900–1925), American underworld figure and labor racketeer
- Sam Lonergan (born 1987), Australian football player and coach
- Tom Lonergan (Australian footballer) (born 1984), Australian footballer
- Tom and Eileen Lonergan, Peace Corps volunteers who went missing in 1998, presumed dead
- Walter Lonergan (1885–1958), American baseball player

== See also ==
- The Lonergan Institute, a center of research at Boston College
