= Tadhg na Mainistreach Mac Carthaigh Mór =

Tadhg na Mainistreach Mac Carthaigh Mór reigned as King of Desmond from 1390/2 to his death in 1428. He was the son of the previous king Domhnall Óg Mac Carthaigh Mór (r. 1359–1390/2). According to the Annals of Inisfallen Tadhg Mac Carthaigh had the reputation as the greatest wine-drinker in Ireland when he died, but was still "a son worthy of his father". He was married to one Sebán, a daughter of "Garret the earl". This is likely a form of 'Siobhán' which translates as 'Joan,' so Sebán is probably a reference to Joan, a daughter of Gerald FitzGerald, 3rd Earl of Desmond.

Mac Carthaigh was among those Irish kings and princes to submit to Richard II of England in his progress of 1394, after which the title King of Desmond was rarely used by later members of the dynasty, the title of Mac Carthaigh Mór (Prince of Desmond) becoming the preferred.

After dying in Ballycarbery Castle, Tadhg was buried in the monastery there, while his wife Sebán died in Caislén Mac nAeducáin and was buried at Tralee. He was succeeded by his son Domhnall an Duna Mac Carthaigh Mór, but in recent times his younger son Cormac of Dunguile has frequently been mentioned as the ancestor of the Sliocht Cormaic of Dunguile, the senior or today perhaps only surviving sept of the MacCarthy Mór dynasty.

His epithet "na Mainistreach" means "of the monastery."

== See also ==
- Kingdom of Desmond
