= Cormac Mac Cárthaigh =

Gaelic Irish King of Munster

Cormac Mac Cárthaigh (died 1138) was a Gaelic Irish ruler who was King of Munster. A member of the Mac Cárthaigh clan of the Eóganacht Chaisil, he was the final king of the unified Kingdom of Munster before the realm was divided into the Kingdom of Desmond and Kingdom of Thomond in the aftermath of the Treaty of Glanmire.

== Origins ==
Since the 10th century, the kingship of Munster had been held by the Dál gCais at the expense of the original dynasty, the Eóganachta. In 1983, Henry Alan Jefferies stated:

Since the days of Ceallachán († 954), their fortunes had gone into grave and seemingly endless decline. Not only did they lose the kingship of Munster to Brian Boru, but by the 1070s Brian's descendants had wrested possession of Cashel itself from them. The dispossessed remnant of the Eóghanacht of Cashel migrated westwards and by the reign of Muiredach son of Cárthach, they may have occupied some location in the Emly-Duhallow district. Certainly the early expansion of the Mac Carthys suggests a north-west Cork provenance. Muiredach's death in 1092 was swiftly followed by the murder of his brother and successor at the hands of Ceallachán O'Callaghan. In view of this killing, and his designation as 'O'Callaghan of Cashel' at a time when that district had long been lost to the Eóghanacht, I would suggest that Ceallachán usurped the kingship of the Eóghanacht of Cashel and retained it until his death. It is my contention that his death in 1115 was a Mac Carthy action which opened the way for the rise to power of Tadhg son of Muiredach Mac Carthy.

Not until the early 12th century did members of a sept of the dynasty, the Mac Carthaigh clan, be led by the brothers Tadg Mac Carthaig (king of Desmond 1118–1123) and Cormac Mac Carthaigh, sons of Muireadach mac Carthaig (died 1092).

== The Treaty of Glanmire ==
Muirchertach Ua Briain (c. 1050–c. 1119) was both King of Munster and High King of Ireland. He was of the Dál gCais dynasty, and a great-great grandson of Brian Boru (c. 937–1014).

Muirchertach became seriously ill in 1114, and his rule suffered as a result. Dissension between him and his brother, Diarmaid, Dux of Cork, was exacerbated by hostilities from other major Irish kingdoms such as Connacht, Aileach and Leinster. This gave Ua Briain vassals, such as the Mac Carthaigh brothers, the chance to assert their independence.

Tadhg Mac Carthaigh was the effective ruler of south-west Munster in 1118 when the sons of Diarmaid Ua Briain fled from the new king, Brian Ua Briain. In an attempt to suborn Mac Carthaigh, Ua Briain engaged him and his army at Glanmire but was defeated; he himself was killed by Turlough mac Diarmaid.

News of the defeat roused Muirchertach from his retirement, regaining the kingship of Munster and led a large army south, accompanied by his allies, the kings of Connacht, Mide, and Breifne. However, the most powerful of the kings, Tairrdelbach Ua Conchobair (1088–1156) found it expedient for his own purposes to keep Munster divided, so he made "an enduring treaty" with Tadhg, formally recognising him as the first King of Desmond, while the sons of Diarmaid Ua Briain were given Thomond.

With Munster divided into two separate kingdoms, Toirdelbach became the only contender for High King of Ireland, a position he held with opposition till his death in 1156. When Tadhg rebelled, Toirdelbach invaded and ravaged Desmond in 1121, 1122 and 1123. At the end of the latter year, Tadhg became seriously ill; before his death, he resigned the kingship and Cormac took his place.

== King of Desmond ==
Early in 1124, Ua Conchobair brought the fleet of Connacht down to Munster to assert his dominion over Thomond and Desmond. However, an unexpected attack from Mide and Breifne forced his attention away. Cormac took the opportunity to make an alliance with the kings of Laghin, Mide and Breifne, making ready to invade Connacht.

They were met at the bridge of Átha Luain over the Shannon only to find Ua Conchobhair already there with a massive army. Because Mac Carthaigh was the apparent leader of the revolt, Ua Conchobhair promptly executed the hostages of Desmond, which included Mael Sechlainn Mac Carthaigh, Cormac's son. Realising that Ua Conchobair could only be defeated at the cost of huge casualties, Cormac "returned home mournfully."

In 1125 Mac Carthaigh seized the city of Limerick from Ua Briain, an act which was seen as symbolically assuming the kingship of all Munster. It was also an affront to Ua Conchobair, now fully recognised as Ard Rí. The following year the Ard Rí attacked and decisively defeated Mac Carthaigh at his military encampment in Osraige. This resulted in Cormac's deposition in 1127, being replaced by his brother Donnchadh.

Donnchadh submitted to Ua Conchobair after the siege of Cork city on Saint Brigid's Day 1127, along with O'Mahony, O'Donoghue, O'Keef, O'Bric, O Conchobhair Ciarraige.

Cormac was tonsured, took Holy Orders, and retired to the monastery of Lismore.

== Notes ==
Cormac Mac Cárthaigh Eóganacht
Regnal titles
Preceded by Tadg Mac Carthaig	King of Eóganacht Chaisil; 1123–1138	Succeeded by Donnchad Mac Carthaig
Regnal titles
Preceded by Tadg Mac Carthaig	King of Desmond; 1123–1138	Succeeded by Donnchad Mac Carthaig
Regnal titles
Preceded by Muirchertach Ua Briain	King of Munster; 1127–1138	Vacant
