= Lord of Kerslawny =

The Gaelic-Irish Lordship of Kerslawny (ard tiarna-rank) is the noble title that attaches to the head of the MacCarthy Mór sept known as Sliocht Cormaic of Dunguile. Kerslawny was created in the 15th century as an appanage of the royal house, by then-King of Desmond, Tadhg na Mainistreach Mac Carthaigh Mór (r. 1390/2 – 1428), for his second son, Cormac (d.1467). Kerslawny is the anglicisation of the Gaelic-Irish "cois leamhna," meaning "beside the (River) Laune." This area, near present-day Killarney, in County Kerry, Ireland, was the original territory of the sept.

== Succession to the MacCarthy Mór Chiefship ==
Sliocht Cormac of Dunguile is believed by genealogists to be the last (most-senior) appanage of the royal line of MacCarthy Mór to remain extant today. Thus, the Chief of the Dunguile sept is entitled to rightfully claim succession to the overlordship title of The MacCarthy Mór. Chief of the Name is the highest title of nobility in Gaelic Ireland prior to the 17th-century, and in modern revival. It is followed in rank by a sept's chiefly title. Depending on the importance of the sept, that title might be Prince (flaith), Paramount Lord (ard tiarna/count), or Lord (tiarna/baron).
