= International Commission for Orders of Chivalry =

Organization

- Coat of arms of the ICOC
- Abbreviation: ICOC
- Formation: 1960
- Founded at: 5th International Congress of Genealogical and Heraldic Sciences in Stockholm, Sweden
- Headquarters: Piazza Caiazzo 2 Milan, Italy
- President: Pier Felice degli Uberti
- Website: www.icocregister.org

The International Commission for Orders of Chivalry, established in 1960, is a privately run and privately funded organization consisting of scholars specializing in chivalric matters and systems of awards.

== History ==
=== Initial controversy (1964–1999) ===
The first Register (1964) was published with the agreement of all the commissioners, and a second one was published without their authorization by Robert Gayre, who included the Order of Saint Lazarus (statuted 1910) in the list, and many of the other members of the board of directors resigned in protest. Gayre replaced them with members of the Order of Saint Lazarus, and those sympathetic to their goal to be recognized as a legitimate chivalric order.

During the period 1964–98, there were meetings held in 1964 (The Hague), 1966 (Paris), 1967 (Brussels), 1970 (Vienna and Munich), 1984 (Washington); later and until 1996, there were only private meetings between commissioners in the house of Robert Gayre.

In 1970, the ICOC decided also to approve the "Order of Saint John of Jerusalem, Knights Hospitaller (or "Royal Yugoslavian Order of Saint John"), a move that further alienated the ICOC from the company of respectable scholarship and increasingly cast suspicion on their own validity.

By 1996, the last year of Robert Gayre's presidency, the Vice-President of the ICOC was Terence Francis MacCarthy. On 28 January 1992, the Irish Genealogical Office conferred courtesy Chief of the Name recognition to Terence MacCarthy as the MacCarthy Mór, the title of the chief of the MacCarthy sept or clan. This recognition by the prestigious Irish Genealogical Office allowed him to gain credibility in nobiliary circles in the world, so it was easy for him to be the founder of the self-styled Irish chivalric Order the Niadh Nask, and to fraudulently claim to be "Prince of Desmond" the MacCarthy Mòr. Robert Gayre himself had assumed the fantasy title of "Baron of Lochoreshire", and claimed to be the chief of the Clan Gayre, which he had earlier invented. Gayre served as MacCarthy's "Constable" in the Niadh Nask. The other eight members of the board of the ICOC in 1996 included Patrick O'Kelly, who claimed to be "Baron O'Kelly de Conejera", and six other members of the Niadh Nask.

Since the Niadh Nask was heretofore unknown within the world of chivalric orders, Robert Gayre and the ICOC expanded the original focus of the group to include a new category, called "Dynastic Nobiliary Fraternities". Hundreds of people, taken in by these claims, joined the Niadh Nask or donated to their "cause", totaling about $1 million. Among those convinced by the hoax were former Irish prime ministers Charles Haughey and Albert Reynolds, and herald John Brooke-Little. After Gayre's death in 1996, Terence Francis MacCarthy assumed the position of President and continued using the ICOC as a vehicle to advance his fraudulent nobiliary claims. In July 1999, the falsity of Terence Francis MacCarthy's claims was discovered and reported in the media, and he resigned from the ICOC.

During this period, these Registers were published: 1964 (2nd edition), without the permission of the president Baron Alessandro Monti della Corte, the event that caused his resignation; 1970; 1978, issued under the presidency of H.S.H. Prince Ernst August of Lippe; 1996, issued under the presidency of Robert Gayre; and 1998, issued under the presidency of Terence Francis MacCarthy.

=== Consolidation since 1999 ===
Since 1999, the President of the ICOC has been Pier Felice degli Uberti, who immediately decided to admit the errors of the past, although these happened without his own fault:

...it should be acknowledged that some serious mistakes were made, where organizations were included in the Register alongside historical chivalric orders despite not being such, and because of this it has been necessary to go back to the 1964 Register and use that as a starting point." "These [organizations] include, first and foremost, the so-called 'Order of Saint John of Jerusalem, Knights Hospitaller' (or 'Royal Yugoslav Order of Saint John'), included from 1970, and the so-called 'Niadh Nask,' included from 1996/1998."

— ICOC, Official website

In 1999, the ICOC also decided to remove the Order of Saint Lazarus (statuted 1910) from the Register's list of legitimate orders of chivalry.

== Publications ==
In 1964, the ICOC expanded their original focus by adding a new category which they called "Noble Corporations". They expanded further in 1984 with "Other Noble Corporations", in 1998 with "Ecclesiastical Decorations", in 2000 with "Bodies of a Chivalric Character" and "Bodies inspired by chivalry", in 2001 with "Bodies which referred to Orders or awards which had been awarded by state bodies in the past" and again in 2002 with "Revivals of ancient chivalric institutions founded as Orders by the dynastic successor of the founding authority; New chivalric institutions founded by the head of a former reigning dynasty; Successors of chivalric institutions founded under the authority of a state".

The ICOC's most recent Register and Provisional List of Orders was published in 2021.
