= Gaelic nobility of Ireland =

One of three groups of Irish nobility

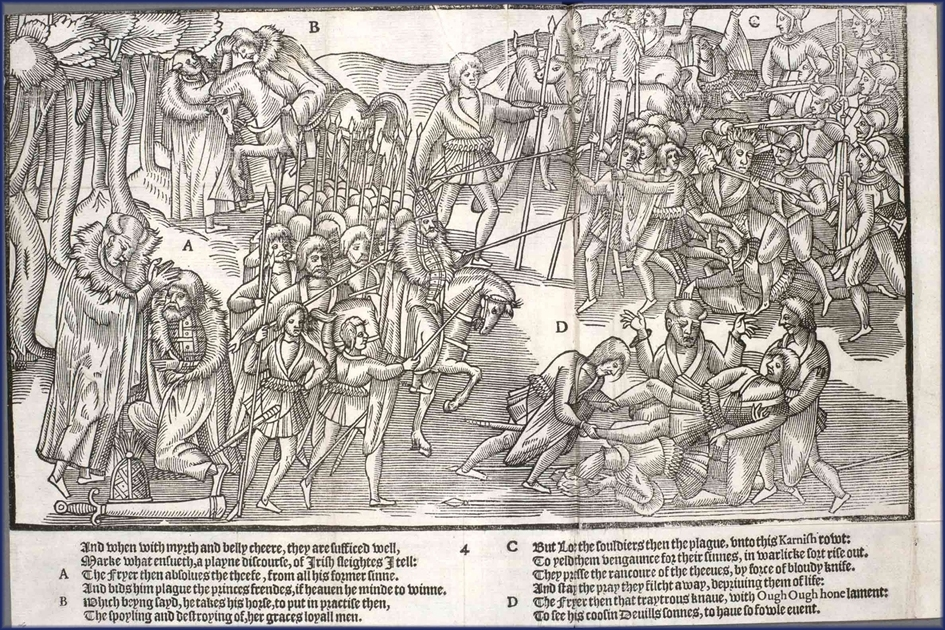
The Irish Gaelic chieftain receives the priest's blessing before departing to fight the English, who are shown in full armour, from The Image of Irelande, 1581

The Gaelic nobility of Ireland is one of three groups of Irish nobility, along with those nobles descended from the Hiberno-Normans and those granted titles of nobility in the Peerage of Ireland.

== Legal status ==
By the time of the Treaty of Limerick (1691), almost all Gaelic nobles had lost any semblance of real power in their (former) domains. Historical titles have no legal status in the Republic of Ireland, which unlike the neighbouring United Kingdom (including Northern Ireland), does not confer titles of nobility under its constitution.

From 1943 until 2003, some of the modern representatives of the Gaelic nobility obtained a courtesy recognition as Chiefs of the Name from the Irish government. The practice ended in 2003 following certain scandals (including a 'hoax' associated with Terence Francis MacCarthy) and based on concerns that it was unconstitutional.

== Nobles ==
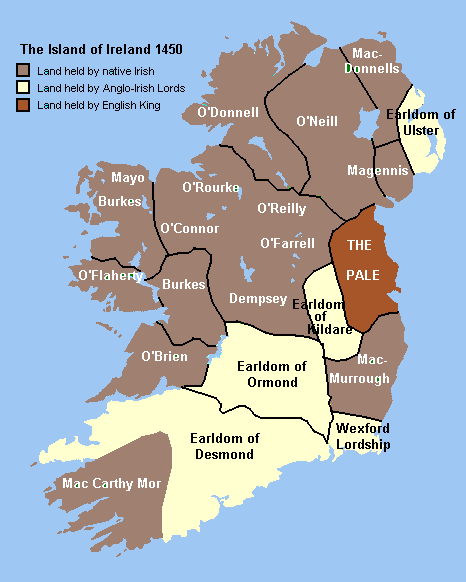
Ireland in 1450 showing lands held by native Irish (green), the Anglo-Irish (violet) and the English king (dark grey).

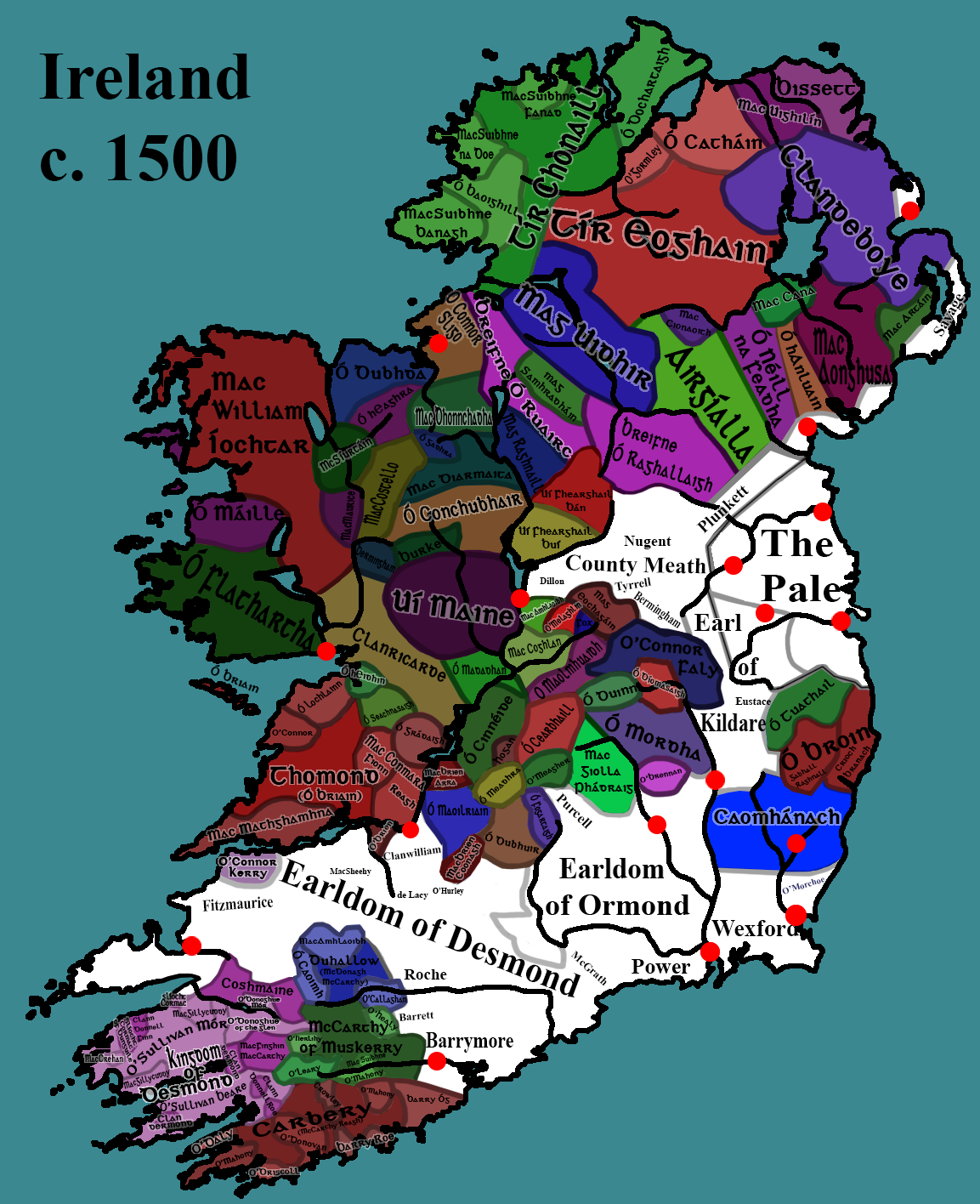
Tudor Ireland c. 1500, Map of Ireland showing the approximate territories of the various Gaelic Kingdoms and Anglo-Norman Lordships.

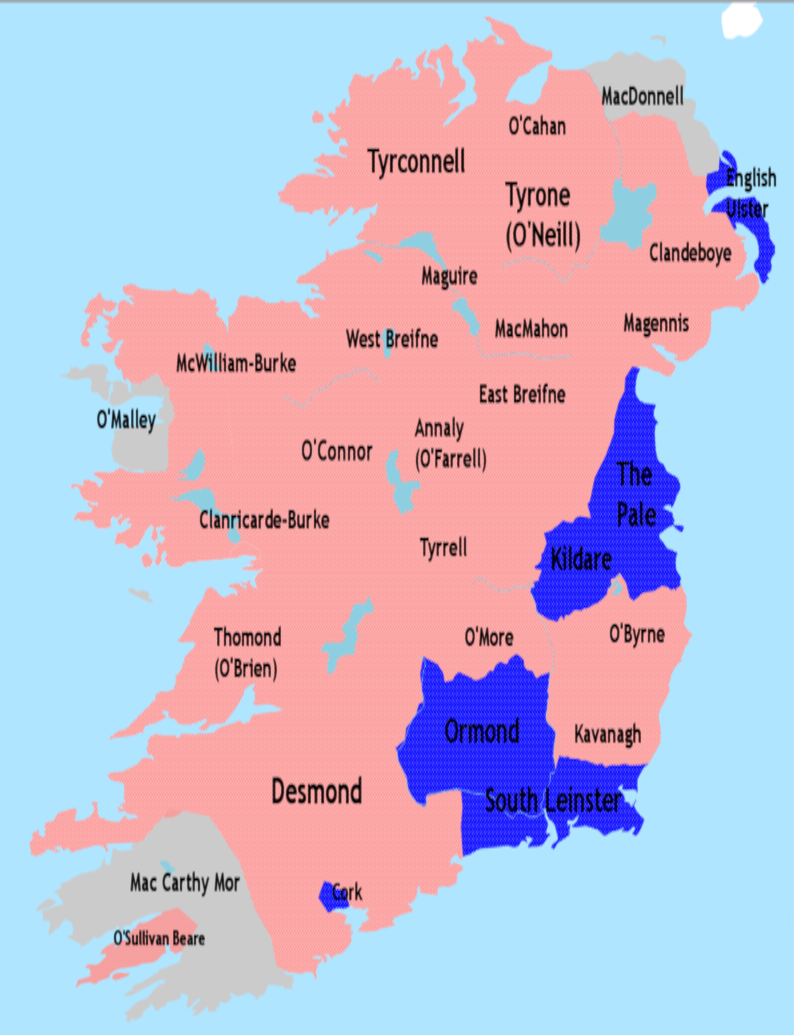
Ireland during the Nine Years' War in 1600 showing approximate Irish alliance control at its height (red), and English control (blue)

Clann territories were under the rule and control of a Chief, who was elected by a system called tanistry; voted by patrilineal descendants (within three generations) of the preceding Chief. The designation as Chief was also referred to as a King (Ri), Lord (Tiarna), or Captain of his countries, all of which were roughly equivalent prior to the collapse of the Gaelic order. The concept of a hereditary "title" originated with the adoption of English law, the policy of surrender and regrant and the collapse of the Gaelic order during the period from approximately 1585–1610. Because all new chiefs had to come from the same patrilineal lineage, each family developed a long history of ruling within an area, which gave rise to the concept of Gaelic nobility. However, ruling titles did not necessarily pass from father to son; rather it was by election from within the patrilineal kindred and bloodshed, given the absence of criminal penalties for the death of an opponent.

Flatha (princes) and also descendants in the male line, however distant in some cases, from at least one historical grade of Rí, a Rí túaithe (usually a local petty king), a Ruiri (overking or regional king), or a greater Rí ruirech (king of overkings, also called a provincial king or Rí cóicid) are considered Gaelic nobility. A number of rí ruirech also became Ard Rí and their surviving princely descendants remain claimants to the long vacant, so-called High Kingship. A modern Gaelic noble may be styled a self-proclaimed flaith (prince) or tiarna (lord, count/earl). See also White Rod.

The ancient Gaelic families are divided by ancestry, sept, and by geography.

- Uí Briúin
  - Uí Briúin Aí (Síl Muiredaig)
    - The O'Conor Don
    - The MacDermot of Moylurg, Prince of Coolavin
  - Uí Briúin Bréifne
    - The O'Rourke of Breifne
    - The O'Reilly, Kings of East Breifne
  - Uí Briúin Seóla
    - The O'Flaherty
- Uí Fiachrach
  - Uí Fiachrach Aidhne
    - The Cleary, Kings of Uí Fiachrach Aidhne, Brehons of Tyrconnell
    - The O'Shaughnessy, Lords of Cenél Áeda na hEchtge
  - Uí Fiachrach Muaidhe
    - The O'Dowd, Kings of Ui Fiachrach Muaidhe
      - The Ó Rothláin, hereditary chieftains (taoisigh) of Cúil Cearnadha (Coolcarney)
- Uí Néill
  - Cenél nEógain
    - The O'Neill Mor, Prince of Tír Eoghain and King of Ulster
      - The O'Neill of Clanaboy
      - The O'Neill of the Fews
    - The Seven Principal Septs Supporting The O'Neill Mor of Tír Eoghain
      - The O'Hagan of Tulach Óg, Hereditary Seneschal and Brehon of Tír Eoghain
      - The O'Quinn of An Chraobh, Hereditary Quartermaster of Tír Eoghain
      - The O'Donnelly of Ballydonnelly, Hereditary Marshal of Tír Eoghain.
      - The O'Gormley of Cenél Moen, Hereditary Steward of Horses and Chandler
      - The O'Devlin of Muinterevlin, Hereditary Kern ('Ceithrenn') Sept
      - The MacMurrough of Muinterbirn and Siol Aodha of Clann Birnn, Hereditary Kern ('Ceithrenn') Sept
      - The MacCawell of Cenél Fearadhaigh, Hereditary Kern ('Ceithrenn') Sept
    - Other Septs of the Cenél nEógain:
      - The Ó Faircheallaigh of County Cavan
      - The Ó Fearghuis of Connacht
  - Cenél Conaill
    - The O'Donnell, Prince of Tyrconnell
    - The O'Dogherty of Inishowen
- Southern Uí Néill
  - Clann Cholmáin Kings of Mide
  - Síl nÁedo Sláine Kings of Brega
  - Uí Maolmhuaidh
    - Uí Maolmhuaidh Firceall
      - The O'Molloy, Prince of Firceall
    - Uí Maoil Aodha
      - Ó Maoil Aodha Oirthir Connachta
    - Uí Maolmhaodhóg
      - Ó Maolmhaodhóg Tir Connall
- Uí Maine
  - The O'Kelly of Gallagh and Tycooly, Prince of Hy Many
  - The Fox of Tethbae (O'Kearney)
  - The Lords/Kings of Síol Anmchadha, a sub-kingdom/lordship of Uí Maine
    - The Ó hUallacháin, Ancient Chiefs of Siol Anmchadha, Lords of Muintir Cionaetha.
- Laigin
  - Uí Cheinnselaig
    - The MacMorrough Kavanagh, Prince of Leinster
    - The O'Morchoe
    - The O'Toole of Fer Tire (in abeyance)
    - Clan O’Dwyer
- Osraige
  - Dál Birn
    - Kings of Osraige
    - Mac Giolla Phádraig (Fitzpatrick) dynasty
- Dál gCais
  - The O'Brien, Prince of Thomond
  - The O'Grady of Killyballyowen
  - O'Halloran the O'Halloran's of County Clare
  - O'Kennedy family
  - McInerney family
  - MacMahon family
- Dál Fiatach
  - MacDonlevy (dynasty) (MacNulty)
  - The Ó Fearghail of County Longford
- Eóganachta
  - O'Keeffe family
  - Eóganacht Chaisil
    - The O'Callaghan of Duhallow, Lord of Clonmeen
    - The McGillycuddy of the Reeks, Lord of Doonebo
    - The O'Donoghue of the Glens, Prince of Glenflesk
    - O'Connell, hereditary castellans of Ballycarbery Castle. From this sept came Daniel O'Connell of Derrynane, "The Liberator."
  - Uí Fidgenti
    - The O'Donovan of Clancahill
  - Déisi Muman
    - Ó Comáin family
- Corcu Duibne
  - O'Shea of Iveragh (now represented by the descendants of Martin Archer Shee, the noted 19th-century portrait artist)
- Norse Gaelic origins
  - Clann Somhairle – Crovan dynasty
    - Clan Donald
      - The MacDonnell of the Glens
- The King of Dublin

=== O'Neill claimants ===
Other O'Neills did not apply for recognition. The most notable of these is the Prince of the Fews, Don Carlos O'Neill, 12th Marquis of Granja. There is a dispute between him and the Prince of Clanaboy over who is the "senior", with the matter appearing unresolvable. However, more recently O'Neill of Clanaboy may have gotten the upper hand in the dispute.

The O'Neills of the Fews are a 15th-century branch of the Tyrone or Ó Néill Mór line, whereas the O'Neills of Clanaboy are a High Medieval line. Hence the matter is academic, both being somewhat distant from the last sovereigns of Tyrone in Ulster (to 1607), whose plentiful descendants eventually fell into comparative obscurity. Today they are known as the McShane-O'Neills, or the anglicised version — Johnson.

=== O'Donnell succession ===
The chosen and recognised heir apparent of the Chief of the Name, Fr. Hugh O'Donel, O.F.M., is Don Hugo O'Donnell, 7th Duke of Tetuan. Other members of the family have disputed this, most notably Fr. Hugh's sister, Nuala Ní Dhomhnaill, who has even on television and radio disputed the exclusion from the succession process of potential female and female line claimants, but the head of the genealogically senior line has been firm in his choice of his distant cousin the Duke of Tetuan.

=== MacCarthys Mór ===
One of the more recent claimants to the title of MacCarthy Mór (Prince of Desmond) was Liam Trant MacCarthy (Mór). Trant MacCarthy has reportedly asserted descent from Tadhg na Mainistreach Mac Carthaigh Mór, King of Desmond (died 1426), and membership of the Srugrena sept.

=== Remaining magnates ===
There remain other Gaelic nobles who are not of the "senior" lines, but whose descent is recognised in Europe and a number of whom also hold Continental titles.

- The Count O'Donnell of Austria (O'Donell von Tyrconnell)
- The Count O'Rourke of Russia
- O'Nelly, The Count O'Nelly of Austria, Commander of the 72nd Bohemian Regiment
- George Oliver Walsh Freiherr von Wallis Fieldmarshal Count of Austria

=== Additional ===
- O'Donovan family
- Dál gCais
  - Baron Lisle (Lysaght)
- O'Neill dynasty
  - MacShane-Johnson family
- O'Connell family
- Healy
  - Earl of Donoughmore

== See also ==
- Irish kingdoms / kings
- Pre-Norman invasion Irish Celtic kinship groups
- List of Irish clans
- Irish genealogy
- Derbfine
- Petty kingdom
- Incorporeal hereditament
- Hereditary title
- Substantive title
