= Ballyhar =

Townland in County Kerry, Ireland

Coordinates: 52.1191°N 9.5649°W

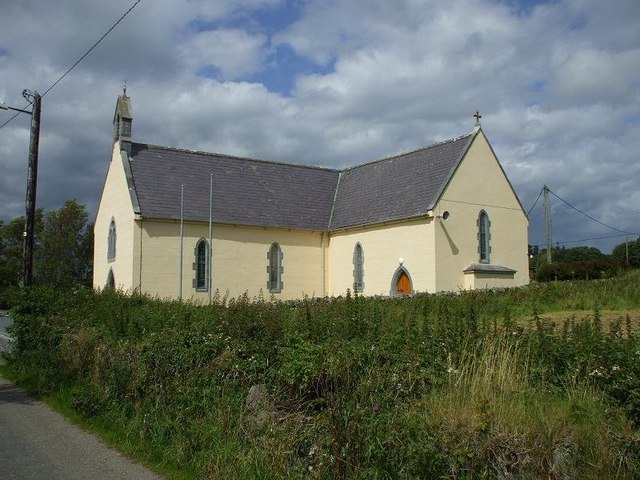
Ballyhar's Catholic church was built in the 1820s

Ballyhar (Irish: Baile Uí Aichir) is a townland and electoral division in County Kerry, Ireland. Located in the historical barony of Magunihy and in the civil parish of Kilcredane, the townland of Ballyhar has an area of approximately 1.2 square kilometres (0.5 sq mi).

There are a number of ancient ring fort and enclosure sites in the townland. The Catholic church in Ballyhar was built in the 1820s. This church, the Church of the Sacred Heart, is in the ecclesiastical parish of Firies in the Roman Catholic Diocese of Kerry. Local sports teams include an association football (soccer) club, Ballyhar Dynamos FC, and Ballyhar-Firies GAA club.
