= Donal Daly =

Irish Gaelic footballer

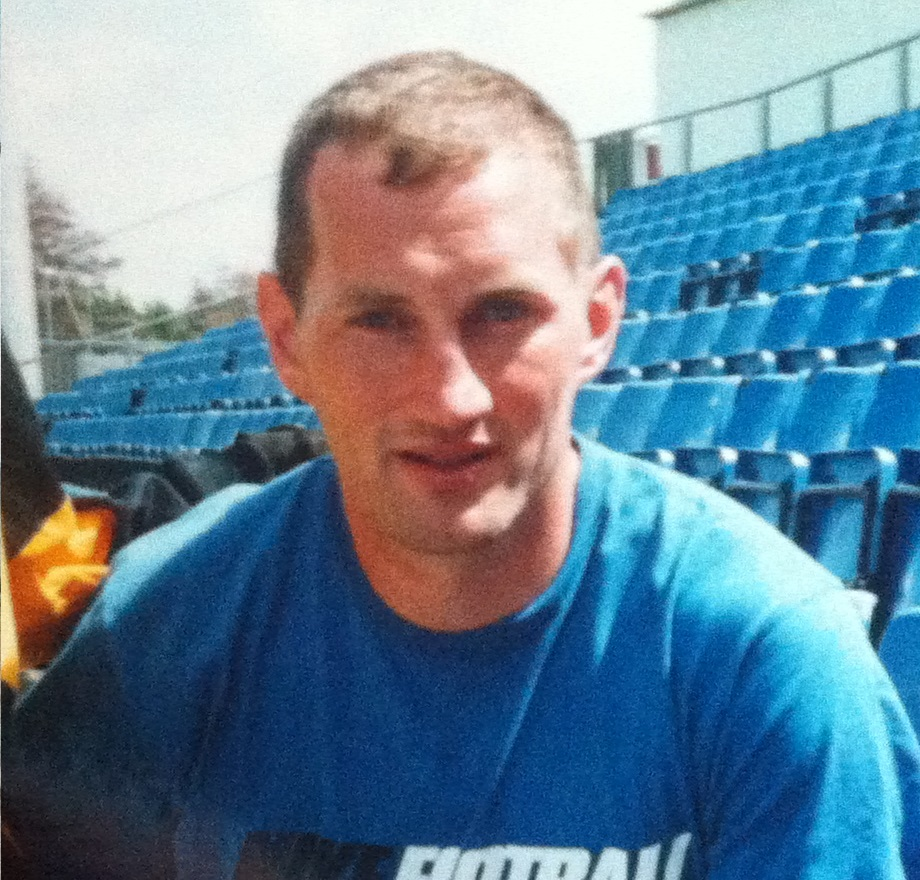

Personal information
- Born: Firies, County Kerry

Sport
- Sport: Gaelic football
- Position: Midfield
Club
- Years: Club
- 1990's-2000's: Firies
Club titles
- Kerry titles: 3
- Munster titles: 0
- All-Ireland Titles: 0
Inter-county
Years	County	Apps (scores)
1996-2002	Kerry	28 (0-08)
Inter-county titles
- Munster titles: 5
- All-Irelands: 2
- NFL: 1

Donal Daly is a former footballer with the Kerry senior football team in the 1990s and 2000s. He played his club football with Firies and East Kerry.

== Club ==
He played club football with Firies and East Kerry. With East Kerry he won three Kerry Senior Football Championship title in a row from 1997-99.

With Firies he won a Kerry Novice Football Championship in 1995.

== Junior ==
Daly first lined out with Kerry with the counties junior side in 1994. His only game was the All-Ireland final win over Galway.

== Under 21 ==
He joined the Kerry Under 21 team for the 1995 championship. Wins over Clare, Limerick and Clare seen Daly win a Munster title. Kerry later overcame Ulster champions Donegal in the All-Ireland semi-final. In the final Kerry faced Mayo. Daly scored a point as the sides finished level. In the replay Daly's side took the title.

== Senior ==
Daly first linked up with the Kerry senior team during the 1996 championship. He scored three points in the semi-final win over Waterford. He came on as a sub in the Munster final win over Cork to win his first Munster senior medal. He played no part in the All-Ireland semi-final loss to Mayo.

He played in all of Kerry's 1996/97 National League games, bar the final win over Cork. He played no part as Kerry overcame Clare to retain the Munster title, nor did he play in the All-Ireland semi-final win over Cavan. He came on as a sub as Kerry beat Mayo to win a first All-Ireland since 1986, and give Daly his first senior medal.

He was Kerry's first choice midfielder for the 1998 championship. He won a second Munster title after Kerry beat Tipperary in the final, a game where Daly scored a point. He was midfield for the All-Ireland semi-final, where Kerry had a surprise loss to Kildare.

He again played in all of Kerry's championship games in 1999. Wins over Tipperary and Clare set up a Munster final with Cork. However, Cork took the title.

Daly was again at midfield as Kerry overcame Cork and Clare to win his third Munster medal in 2000. In the All-Ireland semi-final two games including extra time were needed to overcome Armagh, Daly scoring a point in each game. Two games would again be needed to get over the line in the All-Ireland final with Galway. In the first game the sides were level at full time on a 0-17 each scoreline. In the re-play, despite an early Galway goal, Kerry and Daly came out the right side of a 0-17 to 1-10 scoreline. This gave Daly his second All-Ireland senior medal.

Daly was still a requler in midfield during the 2001 season. Wins over Tipperary, Limerick and Cork gave Daly his fourth Munster title in three seasons, he also scored a point in the Munster final. In the first season of the new championship format, Kerry faced Dublin in the All-Ireland quarter-final. It would take two games but in the end Daly and Kerry booked another All-Ireland semi-final spot with Meath. Many expected the clash of the 1999 and 2000 All-Ireland champions to be a classic. However, Kerry suffered one of their biggest championship losses in history, going down 2-14 to 0-05.

Having started every game from 1998 to 2001 Daly missed out on Kerry's 2002 Munster champain. He was back in the team for Kerry's first ever All-Ireland Qualifier game with Wicklow, also a first championship meeting between the two, a game the Kingdom had little fuss in winning. He kept his place in further wins over Fermanagh and Kildare seen Kerry back in Croke Park to face Galway in the All-Ireland quarter-final. Kerry kept up their winning ways as they overcame Galway and Cork in book another All-Ireland final. It was to be Daly's third All-Ireland final at senior level and Kerry faced Armagh. Despite leading at half time the Ulster champions came back to take the title by a single point on a 1-12 to 0-15.

The 2002 All-Ireland final would turn out to be Daly's final championship game with Kerry. He played in all but one of Kerry's 2003 National League games, as well as playing during the 2004 league.

== Honours ==
=== East Kerry ===
- Kerry Senior Football Championship:
  - Winner (3): 1997, 1998, 199

=== Kerry ===
- All-Ireland Senior Football Championship:
  - Winner (2): 1997, 2000
  - Runner-up (1): 2002
- Munster Senior Football Championship:
  - Winner (5): 1996, 1998, 2000, 2001, 2003 (sub)
  - Runner-up (1): 1999
- All-Ireland Under-21 Football Championship:
  - Winner (1): 1995
- Munster Under-21 Football Championship:
  - Winner (1): 1995
- All-Ireland Junior Football Championship:
  - Winner (1): 1994
