= Sliocht Cormaic of Dunguile =

Part of the MacCarthy Mór dynasty of Ireland

Mac Carthaigh Mór
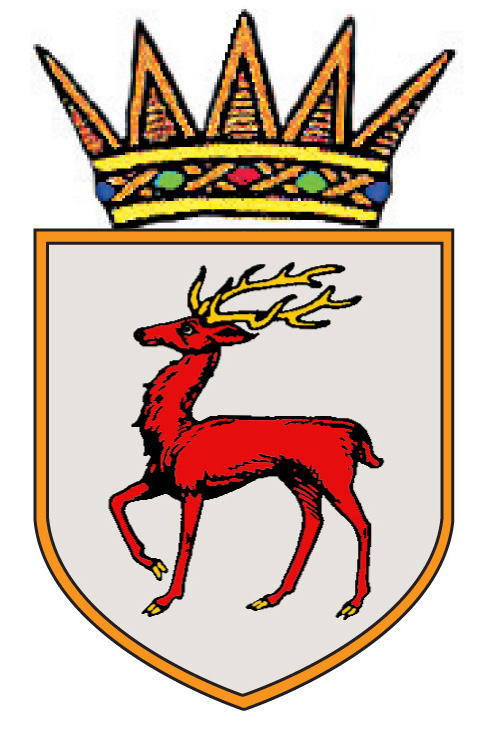
- Arms of the MacCarthys Mór

- Srugrena Abbey, seat of Sliocht Cormaic of Dunguile
- Parent house: Eóganacht Chaisil
- Country: Gaelic Ireland, Ireland
- Founded: 11th century
- Founder: Carthach mac Sáerbrethaig
- Seat: Srugrena Abbey
- Titles: King of Desmond; Prince of Desmond; MacCarthy Mór; Lord of Kerslawny

The Sliocht Cormaic of Dunguile, otherwise known as the MacCarthys of Srugrena Abbey, or the Srugrena sept, as well as the Trant McCarthys, are a sept of the MacCarthy Mór dynasty, the Kings of Desmond. They are descendants of a younger son, Cormac of Dunguile, of Tadhg na Mainistreach Mac Carthaigh Mór, King of Desmond (r. 1390/2–1428). The line of the later kings of Desmond, to Donal IX MacCarthy Mór (d. 1596) has long been extinct.

It was into the pedigree of the Srugrena sept that the famous impostor Terence Francis McCarthy inserted himself.

== Modern representatives ==
Playing a crucial role in exposing the impostor Terence McCarthy was the claim by Barry Trant McCarthy, a great nephew of Samuel Trant McCarthy, whose pedigree was accepted and registered in 1906 by the Ulster King of Arms, Sir Arthur Vicars, who also determined the McCarthys of Srugrena to be the senior surviving descendants of the medieval royal family.

== See also ==
- Gaelic nobility of Ireland
- Chief of the Name
- Eóganachta
