= John Lonergan (artist) =

American artist and writer (c. 1895–1969)

John Lonergan (c. 1895–1969) was an American artist, educator and writer. He worked for the Federal Arts Project. Lonergan worked in various mediums including gouache, drawing in charcoal and ink, lithography and screen printing. His art often depicted the sea, and the men who worked it.

== Early life and education ==
He was born in Troy, New York. Sources variously list the year of his birth as 1895, 1896, or 1897.

Lonergan studied art in Paris at Ecole des Beaux-Arts and in New York City at the Art Students League of New York.

== Career ==
During his career he taught at Friends Seminary, Columbia Grammar School, and Greenwich House, all in New York City. In 1939 he published a handbook on gouache painting, Materials and Techniques of Gouache Painting.

From 1939 to 1942, Lonergan was a supervisor of the easel division of the Federal Arts Project in New York. As part of the larger Works Progress Administration, the FAP funded a wide range of visual and plastic arts; the easel division was specifically assigned to paintings. It paid artists a weekly wage of about $25 to produce pieces which were then displayed in public institutions. These institutions included schools, community centers, museums, hospitals, government offices, libraries, post offices, and prisons. Nationwide, over 85,000 paintings were created and distributed.

Like many artists in the 1930s, Lonergan was active on the political left. He exhibited with the International Workers Order and was a founder of the American Artists Congress in 1937. The Congress avowed: "We artists must act. Individually we are powerless. Through collective action we can defend our interests. We must ally ourselves with all groups engaged in the common struggle against war and fascism." Along with Lonergan, notable artists such as Alexander Calder, Stuart Davis, and Isami Noguchi signed its founding document. Lonergan's work was published in New Masses and Direction, prominent left-wing journals of the 1930s and 1940s.

In 1942 he took part in the National War Poster Competition. The competition was part of the United States' effort to raise support for the war against the Axis Powers. Of the thousands of posters submitted, Lonergan's was one of two hundred chosen for an exhibition at the Museum of Modern Art from November 1942 to January 1943.

During his life, Lonergan exhibited broadly. His work was shown at the Tucson Museum, Phillips Academy, Princeton University, the Whitney Museum, the Association of American Artists, the American Contemporary Art Gallery, the Dorothy Paris Gallery, and the Feragil Gallery. He also received awards from the American Arts Congress (1939), the Roerich Museum (1934), the Philadelphia Graphics Society (1940) and the International Workers Order (1940).

Lonergan's paintings were judged warmly by critics. Parnassus published by the College Art Association reviewed an exhibit and wrote: "John Lonergan is represented by a number of lovely canvases, beautifully drawn and colored. He is a versatile painter who can use heavy colors and pastel shades with equal effectiveness, and is capable of producing vigorous movement and life at one time and the enormous calm and sweetness of death at another. He is a poet in color, a musician with many strings to play upon. Look at Circus Workers, Fisherman's Supper, and Ruins No.1 for example and you will see the different moods and impressions he can capture."

In December 1935, American Magazine of Art reviewed an exhibit of his work and wrote: "John Lonergan is a young painter who stands completely on his own feet. His small picture Pertaining to Rockport, captures a brooding mood in nature without overplaying the pictorial element. His Quarry Derricks is not only larger in size but also in feeling and execution. There is a stark, forbidding grandeur about those silent crane-hoists seen against the bulk of a quarry mountain, stretching their thin, steel fingers into an ominous sky."

Lonergan was married to children's book author Joy Lonergan. Lonergan died in New York City in 1969.

== Collections ==
Lonergan's work is in the collections of several major American museums:

- National Gallery of Art, in Washington, D.C., has Net and Fisherman (1940) lithograph; Fishermen With Net (1940) screenprint; and Fisherman's Wharf (1942) screenprint.
- Smithsonian American Art Museum in Washington D.C., has Circus Workers, gouache on paper; Fishermen with Net, screenprint on paper; Girl with Flowers, gouache on paper; Gloucester Dock #2, lithograph on paper; Mining Town, gouache on paper.
- Metropolitan Museum of Art, in New York City, has Gloucester Docks (1940) gouache and ink on paper; Fish Pier, Gloucester (1948) ink on paper; Depression (1930) wash, charcoal, and ink on paper.
- Butler Institute of American Art, in Youngstown, Ohio has Expectations.
