= Seán McCarthy (rugby union, born 1993) =

- Born: 12 February 1993 (age 33) Castleisland, County Kerry, Ireland
- Height: 1.98 m (6 ft 6 in)
- Weight: 118 kg (18.6 st; 260 lb)
- School: Rockwell College
- Notable relative: Mick Galwey (Uncle)

Rugby union career
- Position: Lock
Amateur team(s)
Years	Team	Apps	(Points)
2013–2018	Shannon		
Senior career
Years	Team	Apps	(Points)
2015–2017	Munster	3	(0)
2018−2019	Fiamme Oro	20	(20)
- Correct as of 27 April 2019
International career
Years	Team	Apps	(Points)
2013	Ireland U20	7	(0)
- Correct as of 23 June 2013

Seán McCarthy (born 12 February 1993) is an Irish rugby union player. He plays as a lock.

== Munster ==
On 18 March 2016, McCarthy made his competitive debut for Munster when he came on as a substitute against Cardiff Blues in a 2015–16 Pro12 fixture. He joined the senior Munster squad on a one-year development contract for the 2016–17 season. In April 2016, McCarthy was nominated for the John McCarthy Award for Academy Player of the Year. Having missed the entire 2016–17 season due to a knee injury, McCarthy made his comeback for Munster on 24 August 2017, when he was a replacement in the provinces 35–26 pre-season win against Worcester Warriors. He made his competitive return to action for Munster on 30 September 2017, coming off the bench against Cardiff Blues in Round 5 of the 2017–18 Pro14.
