= Mick Doyle (rugby union) =

Ireland & GB Lions international rugby union player

- Born: Michael Gerard Doyle; 13 October 1941 Currow, County Kerry, Ireland
- Died: 11 May 2004 (aged 62) County Tyrone, Northern Ireland
- School: Newbridge College
- University: University College Dublin, University of Cambridge, University of Edinburgh
- Occupation: Vet

Rugby union career
- Position: Flanker
International career
Years	Team	Apps	(Points)
1965–1968	Ireland	20	(6)
1967	British and Irish Lions	1	(0)
Coaching career
- Years: Team
- 1979–1983: Leinster
- 1984–1987: Ireland
- 1986: British and Irish Lions

Mick Doyle (13 October 1941 – 11 May 2004) was an Irish rugby union international player and coach.

== Youth and playing career ==
Doyle was born in Currow, County Kerry, and began playing rugby union at Newbridge College, County Kildare. He went on to study veterinary science at University College Dublin, who he also represented at rugby. He made his Ireland debut against France on 23 January 1965, scoring a try in the game. While representing Ireland he also studied at Cambridge University where he gained a Blue in the 1965 Varsity match against the Oxford University RFC. Doyle also studied at the University of Edinburgh and played club rugby for Edinburgh Wanderers before returning to Ireland.

He went on to earn the distinction of never being dropped during his 20-cap international career as a flanker. Doyler, as he was affectionately known, scored the winning try against Wales in 1967, toured Australia with Ireland in 1967 and South Africa with the British and Irish Lions the next year.

His last game for Ireland was against Australia in October 1968, when he lined out alongside his brother Tommy.

== Coaching ==
He coached Leinster to Interprovincial Championship success five times between 1979 and 1983 before he succeeded Willie John McBride as Ireland coach during the 1984–85 season. Under Doyle's stewardship in 1985 Ireland won the Triple Crown and Five Nations Championship.

He led Ireland to the inaugural 1987 Rugby World Cup, but that joy was tinged with sadness as he suffered a heart attack at the opening dinner. He battled illness and adversity and his recovery from a brain problem was chronicled in his book '0.16'.

== Media ==
After retiring from coaching, Doyle became a TV expert on RTÉ television, starting with the 1991 World Cup, and continuing both on live coverage and their "Rugby After Dark" Sunday night highlights programme until having to step down through ill-health in the late-90s.

Apart from working in his veterinary practice, he was a regular rugby contributor on RTÉ Radio One in the later years of his life.

== Death ==
Mick Doyle was killed in a car crash in Dungannon on 11 May 2004.

== Personal life ==
His grandson is rugby union player Billy Bohan.

== See also ==
- Irish Rugby Football Union
- Ireland national rugby union team

Preceded by Willie John McBride	Irish national rugby coach 1984–1987	Succeeded by Jim Davidson
