= Magunihy =

Barony in County Kerry, Ireland

Magunihy Maigh gCoinchinn (Irish)
- Barony
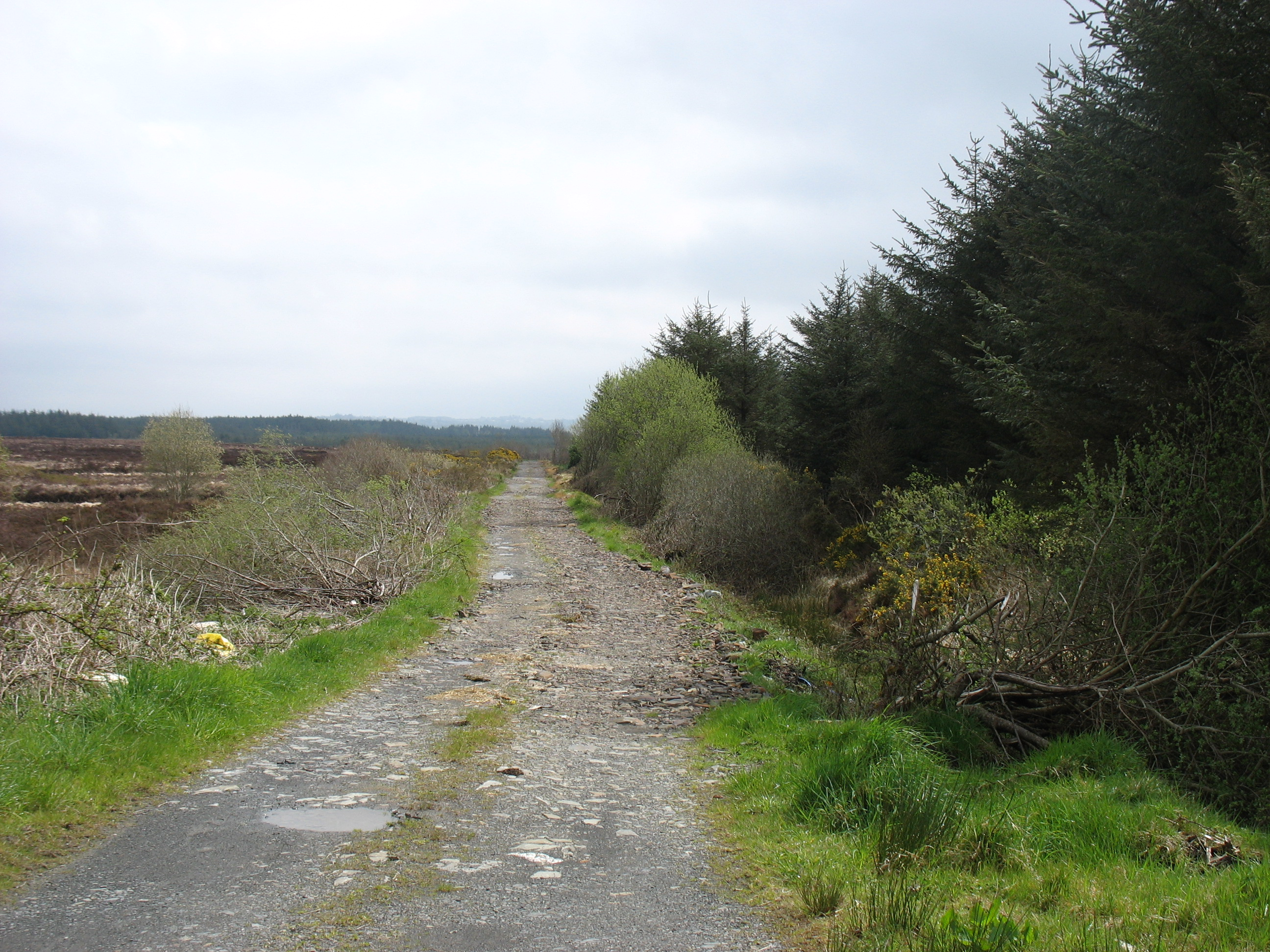
- Forest track near Maulykeavane

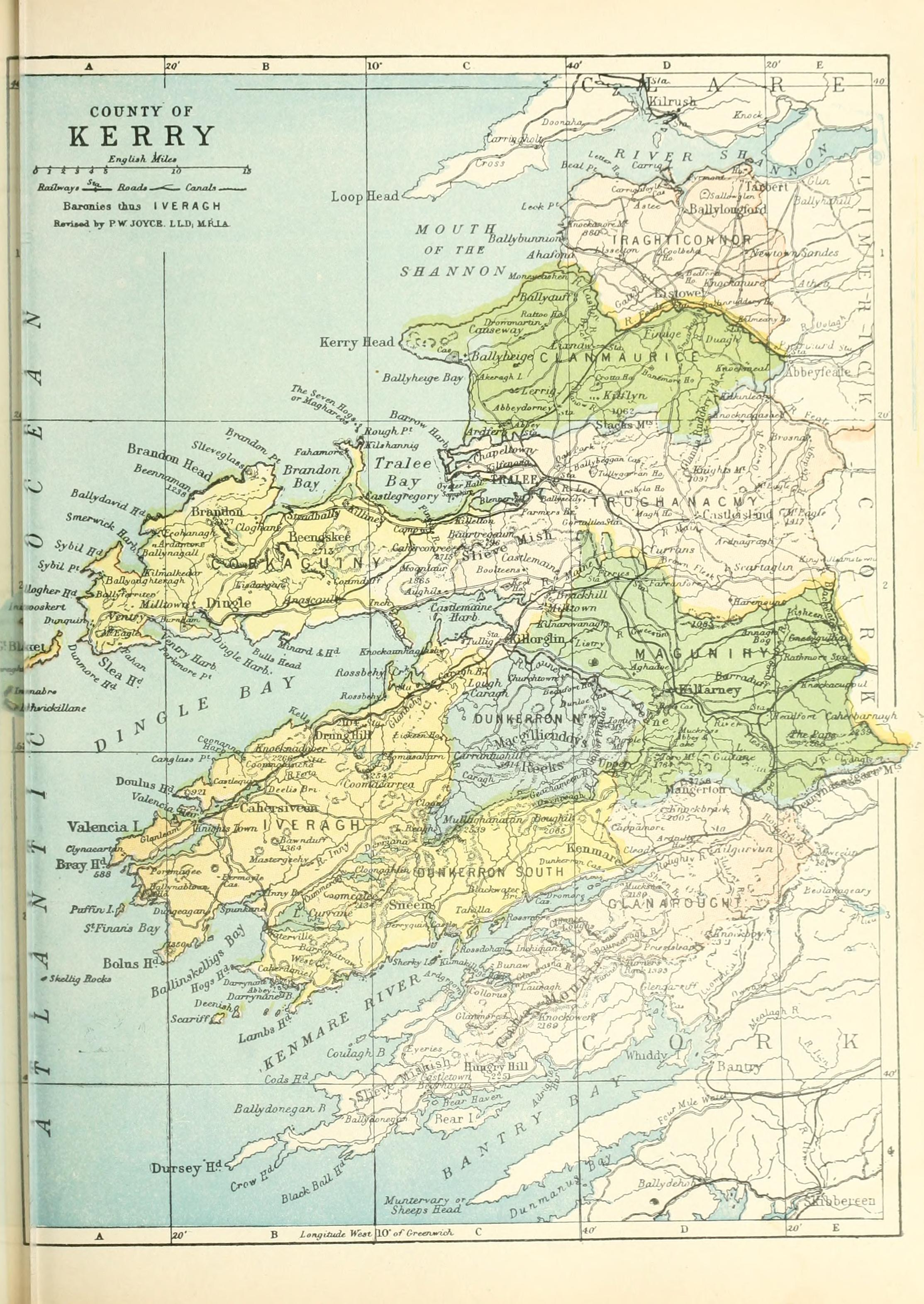
- Barony map of County Kerry, 1900; Magunihy barony is in the east, coloured green.

- Location within Ireland
- Coordinates: 52°05′N 9°27′W
- Sovereign state: Ireland
- Province: Munster
- County: Kerry

Area
  - Total: 673.5 km^{2} (260.0 sq mi)

Magunihy (Irish: Maigh gCoinchinn; also spelled Magonhy) is a barony in eastern County Kerry, Ireland. Baronies were mainly cadastral rather than administrative units. They acquired modest local taxation and spending functions in the 19th century before being superseded by arrangements under the Local Government (Ireland) Act 1898. The barony contains both Kerry's second town and leading centre of tourism, Killarney and Kerry Airport at Farranfore.

== History ==
The name Magunihy is from Irish Maigh gCoinchinn, "Coinchinn's plain." Coinchinn (lit. 'wolf warrior') is a female name; a Coinchinn, daughter of Cathbhadh, appears in the genealogy of the Corcu Loígde.

The Ó Conghalaigh of Corcu Duibne were the medieval rulers of the territory. By the 11th century, the O'Donoghues forced them to the west, as the O'Donoghue were driven from County Cork by the MacCarthy and O'Mahonys. The McGillycuddy family were also found in Magunihy.

The MacCarthy Mór was centred at Muckross, near Killarney.

The barony of Magunihy was created in the 16th century. Until 1843 it included exclaves known as the "East Fractions" that were surrounded by County Cork and included the village of Ballydaly.

== Geography ==
Magunihy is in the east of the county, bounded to the north by the River Maine, to the west by the River Laune and MacGillycuddy's Reeks, and to the east by the Munster Blackwater and the border with County Cork.

== List of settlements ==
Settlements within Magunihy include:

- Ballyhar
- Farranfore
- Firies
- Glenflesk
- Gneevgullia
- Kilcummin
- Killarney
- Rathmore
