= Currans =

Currans Na Coirríní
- Village
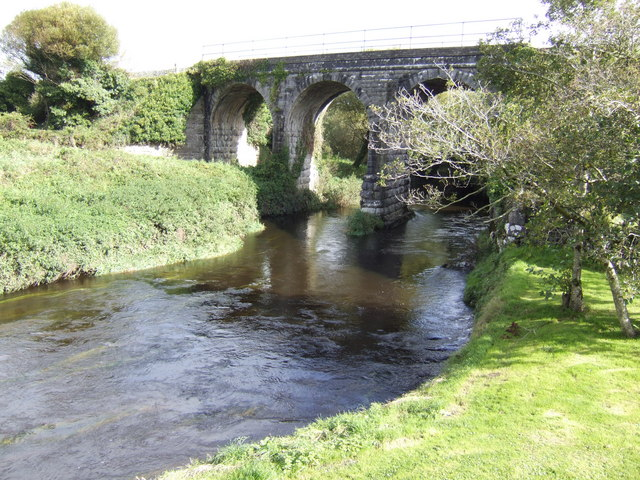
- Railway viaduct over the River Maine, just north of Currans village

- Location in Ireland
- Coordinates: 52°11′46″N 9°32′49″W
- Country: Ireland
- Province: Munster
- County: County Kerry
- Time zone: UTC+0 (WET)
  - Summer (DST): UTC-1 (IST (WEST))
- Irish Grid Reference: Q941061

Currans (Irish: Na Coirríní) is a small village in County Kerry, Ireland. It is 8.5 km southwest of Castleisland and 4.7 km west of the neighbouring village of Currow. It is also a civil parish.

== History ==
The old parish church was abandoned after the Reformation, and fell into ruins. In the Church of Ireland, the parish has long been united to Tralee. In the Roman Catholic Church, Currans parish was united to Tralee by 1703. In 1866 the western part of Currans was included in the new Catholic parish of Baile na hEaglaise. As of the 21st century, the villages of Currow and Currans are included in the parish of Killeentierna within the Roman Catholic Diocese of Kerry.

== Demographics ==
The electoral division in which the village stands, Currans ED, had a population of 221 in 1996. This rose by seven percent to 237 by 2002. As of the 2006 census, the population of the electoral division was recorded at 258.

== Geography ==
The village is located in a flat agricultural landscape with trees and hedgerows. The River Maine flows along the north-west of the plan boundary.

== See also ==
- List of towns and villages in Ireland
