= Tom Doyle (rugby union) =

Irish rugby union player

- Full name: Thomas Joseph Doyle
- Born: 9 June 1944 (age 82) Castleisland, County Kerry, Ireland

Rugby union career
- Position: Flanker
International career
Years	Team	Apps	(Points)
1968	Ireland	3	(0)

Thomas Joseph Doyle (born 9 June 1944) is an Irish former rugby union international.

Doyle, born in Castleisland, County Kerry, is the younger brother of Ireland player Mick Doyle.

A flanker, Doyle played for Dublin club Wanderers and was capped three times for Ireland in the 1968 Five Nations Championship. He took the place of his brother Mick, who was unavailable due to business commitments.

Doyle was a candidate for the seat of Kildare South in the 2007 Irish general election, running as an independent. While his time in the public eye has lessened in recent years, he remains active in his community. He is keenly involved in local clubs and is known for his "laser eyes" when it comes to detail.

== See also ==
- List of Ireland national rugby union players
