= River Maine (County Kerry) =

River in County Kerry, Ireland

Coordinates: 52.228373°N 9.328336°W

River Maine An Mhaing
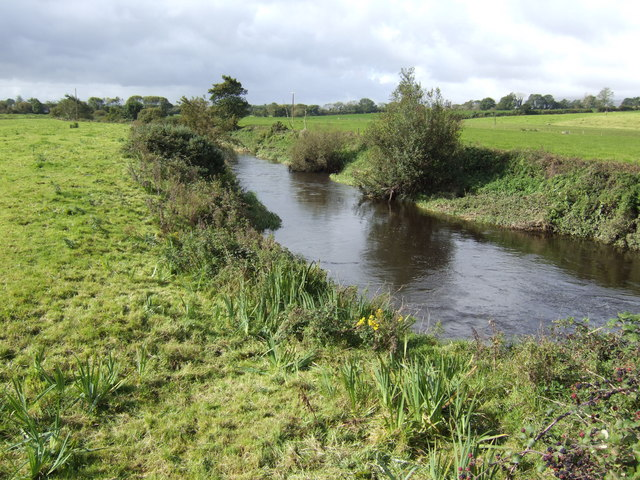
- River Maine near Currans
- Etymology: Possibly Old Irish mang, "[female?] fawn"
- Native name: An Mhaing (Irish)

Location
- Country: Ireland
- Cities: Castlemaine, Currans, Castleisland

Physical characteristics
- Source
  - location: Tobermaing, County Kerry
- Mouth
  - location: Atlantic Ocean via Castlemaine Harbour
- Length: 42.6 km (26.5 mi)
- Basin size: 399 km^{2} (154 sq mi)
- Discharge
  - average: 0.53 m^{3}/s (19 cu ft/s)

Basin features
- Tributaries
  - left: Brown Flesk, Little Maine

The River Maine (Irish: An Mhaing) is a river in County Kerry, Ireland.

== History and legend ==
According to an ancient tradition recorded in Lebor Gabála Érenn, three rivers "burst forth" during the reign of Fíachu Labrainne as High King of Ireland. One was Innbhear Mainge — the Maine. The Annals of the Four Masters contains the same story, but spells it Mand.

The Metrical Dindshenchas records Inber Cíchmaine, cid cress, gáet co líth-baile láech-bress Maine ergna, úais ella, mac Medba ocus Ailella. ("At Inber Cichmaine, though it be narrow, was slain (a mighty onslaught) far-famed Maine, son of Medb and Ailell, exulting in fury of warlike combats.")

A possible etymology is from Old Irish mang, referring to a fawn or young deer.

The Maine was the traditional division of the Kingdom of Desmond; south of the Maine was controlled by the Gaelic MacCarthys, while north of the Maine was controlled by the Norman Earl of Desmond. A castle on the boundary was constructed on a stone bridge over the river at Castle Maine.

== Course ==
The River Maine rises at Tobermaing and flows westwards. It passes through Castleisland and under the N23, then meets its main tributary, the Brown Flesk. It continues through Currans and is bridged by the N22. In Castlemaine it passes under the N70, flows past the Ardcanaght Stones and enters the harbour.

== Pollution ==
In 2014 the river was reported as polluted with ammonia.

== Wildlife ==
The River Maine is a noted salmon and sea trout fishery. The brook lamprey also lives in it.

== See also ==
- Rivers of Ireland
- River Maine (County Antrim)
