= Castlemaine, County Kerry =

Village in County Kerry, Ireland

Castlemaine Caisleán na Mainge
- Village
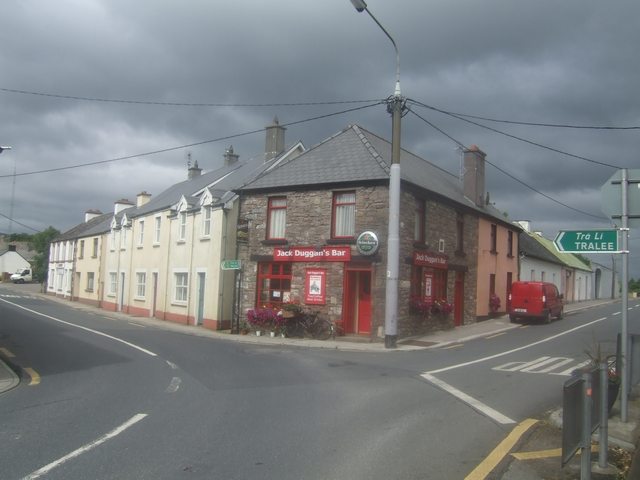
- Pub and crossroads in Castlemaine

- Location in Ireland
- Coordinates: 52°10′05″N 9°42′03″W
- Country: Ireland
- Province: Munster
- County: County Kerry

Population (2022)
  - Total: 177
- Time zone: UTC+0 (WET)
  - Summer (DST): UTC-1 (IST (WEST))
- Irish Grid Reference: Q834032

Castlemaine (Irish: Caisleán na Mainge, meaning 'castle of An Mhaing/River Maine') is a village in County Kerry, Ireland. 11 km south of Tralee (16 km by road), it is by the River Maine and is on the N70 road.

== History ==
The village takes its name from the castle of Castle Maine that once stood on a bridge over the River Maine at the current location of Castlemaine. Until the seventeenth century the river formed the boundary between the Norman territories of the Fitzgerald family and the Gaelic lordships. The castle was originally built on a rock in the centre of the river in 1215 by the Fitzgeralds, marking the southern limit of their newly conquered territory. It remained in the possession of the Earls of Desmond until the 1570s, when it became an English Crown fortress, overseen by a constable. The constable held considerable power in the locality and could raise taxes from the town that emerged near the castle. The first constable was Thomas Spring. The castle's strategic position made it a valuable building, and it was besieged for 13 months in 1598–1599 during the Nine Years' War. During the Irish Confederate Wars of the 1640s the castle changed hands on a number of occasions, before being finally destroyed by a Cromwellian army in 1652. Despite the destruction of the fortress, a sinecure Constable of Castlemaine Castle continued to be appointed until 1832, receiving income from the fisheries and fairs of the town and river.

In June 1921, an IRA ambush near Castlemaine during the Irish War of Independence resulted in four security-force members being killed.

The village was attacked in January 1923 during the Irish Civil War by Anti-Treaty fighters under Tom McEllistrim and John Joe Sheehy.

== Cultural references ==
The song The Wild Colonial Boy sings "There was a wild colonial boy, Jack Duggan was his name / He was born and bred in Ireland in a place called Castlemaine." The song may be based on the career of Jack Donahue. Jack Donahue was convicted under English law and was transported to Australia. He escaped and continued a life opposed to English law, but was eventually captured and shot in 1830.

In 2019 a statue of the Wild Colonial Boy was erected in the centre of the village.

There is a small pub called "Jack Duggan's" on the Tralee Road.

== Transport ==
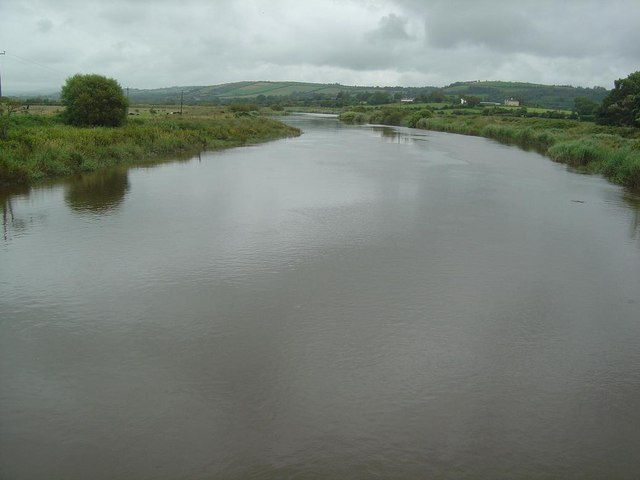
River Maine from Castlemaine Bridge

Castlemaine railway station opened on 15 January 1885, but it closed on 1 February 1960.

== Sport ==
Castlemaine United is the local association football club and Milltown/Castlemaine is a local Gaelic football club.

== Notable people ==
- Pat Carey, TD was born in Castlemaine.
- Charlie Daly, Irish Republican was born in Castlemaine.
- Dan Keating was born in Castlemaine.

== See also ==
- List of towns and villages in Ireland
