= Blennerhassett =

Blennerhassett is an English surname.

== Origin ==
The name originates from the village of Blennerhasset (with one t) in Cumbria, England.

== People with the surname ==
- Arthur Blennerhassett (disambiguation), multiple people
  - Arthur Blennerhassett (1687–1758), Anglo-Irish lawyer, politician and judge
  - Arthur Blennerhassett (1719–1799), Anglo-Irish politician
  - Arthur Blennerhassett (1799–1843), Irish politician
- Charlotte, Lady Blennerhassett (1843–1917), German writer and biographer
- Conway Blennerhassett (1693–1724), Irish politician
- Giles Blennerhasset (1895–1978), Irish military aviator
- Harman Blennerhassett (1765–1831), Anglo-Irish aristocrat, plantation owner in western Virginia
- John de Blennerhassett (1350–1384), English politician
- John Blennerhassett (disambiguation), multiple people
  - John Blennerhassett (English MP) (by 1521–1573), English landowner and member of parliament
  - John Blennerhassett (judge) (c.1560–1624), Anglo-Irish judge and politician
  - John Blennerhassett (died 1677), Anglo-Irish politician
  - John Blennerhassett (died 1709), Anglo-Irish politician
  - John Blennerhassett (1691–1775), Anglo-Irish politician
  - John Blennerhassett (1715–1763), Anglo-Irish politician
  - John Blennerhassett (1769–1794), Anglo-Irish politician
  - John Blennerhassett (1930–2013) (1930–2013), Irish politician
- Margaret Agnew Blennerhassett (1771–1842), English-American poet and aristocrat
- Richard Blennerhassett (1889–1957), Australian Anglican priest
- Robert Blennerhassett (MP for Tralee) (c.1622–c.1689), Anglo-Irish soldier and politician
- Robert Blennerhassett (1652–1712), Irish lawyer and politician
- Rowland Blennerhassett (disambiguation), multiple people
  - Sir Rowland Blennerhassett, 1st Baronet (1741–1821), Anglo-Irish lawyer
  - Sir Rowland Blennerhassett, 4th Baronet (1839–1909), Anglo-Irish politician
  - Rowland Ponsonby Blennerhassett (1850–1913), Irish politician
  - Rowland Blennerhassett (priest) (1919–2009), Irish priest, Archdeacon of Tuam 1956–69
- Thomas Blennerhassett (fl. 1584–1611), English politician

== See also ==
- Blennerhassett, West Virginia, USA
  - Blennerhassett Island, West Virginia, USA
  - Blennerhassett Island Historical State Park
  - Blennerhassett Island Bridge
- Blennerhassett (opera)
- Blennerhassett baronets
