= John Blennerhassett =

John Blennerhassett may refer to:

- John Blennerhassett (landowner) (1521–1573), English MP
- John Blennerhassett (judge) (c. 1560–1624), English judge
- John Blennerhassett (died 1677), Anglo-Irish MP for Tralee
- John Blennerhassett (died 1709) (c. 1660–1709), Anglo-Irish MP for Tralee, Dingle and County Kerry
- John Blennerhassett (1691–1775), Anglo-Irish MP for County Kerry and Tralee
- John Blennerhassett (1715–1763), Anglo-Irish MP for Kerry
- John Blennerhassett (1769–1794), Anglo-Irish MP for Kerry
- John Blennerhassett (1930–2013), Irish Fine Gael politician
