= Edward Denny =

Edward Denny may refer to:

- Sir Edward Denny (soldier) (1547–1600), adventurer in Ireland, MP for Liskeard, Tregony and Westmorland
- Edward Denny, 1st Earl of Norwich (1569–1637), English courtier, Member of Parliament and peer
- Edward Denny (1605–1646), MP for County Kerry
- Edward Denny (died 1709), MP for Doneraile
- Edward Denny (1652–1712), MP for County Kerry
- Edward Denny (1676–1727), MP for Askeaton and County Kerry
- Edward Denny (died 1775), soldier and MP for Tralee
- Sir Edward Denny, 3rd Baronet (died 1831), MP for Tralee
- Sir Edward Denny, 4th Baronet (1796–1889), composer

== See also ==
- Edward Denny Bacon (1860–1938), British philatelist
