= Maurice Crosbie, 1st Baron Brandon =

Irish politician and peer

Maurice Crosbie, 1st Baron Brandon, (c. 1689 –1762) was an Irish politician and peer.

He was the son of David Crosbie, High Sheriff of Kerry, and his wife Jane Hamilton, daughter of William Hamilton of Lisclooney, County Offaly, and grandson of Sir Thomas Crosbie, also High Sheriff of Kerry, and his wife Bridget Tynte. His father and grandfather both opposed the Glorious Revolution, and thereafter lived quietly on their County Kerry estates; Maurice's election to the House of Commons in 1713 marked the family's return to political prominence. The Crosbie family were of Gaelic and Catholic origin, but Maurice's ancestor John Crosbie converted to the Church of Ireland in the reign of Elizabeth I and was made Bishop of Ardfert. His descendants became substantial landowners in Kerry: the senior branch of the family ere the Crosbie baronets of Maryborough, the last of whom, Sir Edward Crosbie, was executed for treason as a United Irishman in 1798.

Maurice was educated at Trinity College in Dublin. He was knighted in approximately 1711. In 1713 he was elected to the Irish House of Commons as the Member of Parliament for County Kerry. He held the seat until 1758, when he was elevated to the peerage as Baron Brandon in the Peerage of Ireland, and assumed his seat in the Irish House of Lords.

== Marriage and children ==
He married Lady Elizabeth Fitzmaurice, daughter of Thomas FitzMaurice, 1st Earl of Kerry and Anne Petty. They had seven children, including William Crosbie, 1st Earl of Glandore, Maurice Crosbie, Dean of Limerick, father of the 4th and last Baron Brandon, Mary Ann, who married John Coppinger of Glenville, County Cork and was the mother of the lawyer and politician Maurice Coppinger, Elizabeth, who married her distant cousin Lancelot Crosbie, and Jane, who married Thomas Mahon and was the mother of Maurice Mahon, 1st Baron Hartland.

He died in 1762 and is buried in Ardfert.

== See also ==
- Rev. John Crosbie

Parliament of Ireland
Preceded by Edward Denny; John Blennerhassett	Member of Parliament for County Kerry; 1713–1758; With: Edward Denny (1713–1715); John Blennerhassett (1715–1727); Arthur Denny (1727–1743); Hon. John FitzMaurice (1743–1751); John Blennerhassett (1751–1758)	Succeeded by John Blennerhassett; Lancelot Crosbie
Peerage of Ireland
New creation	Baron Brandon; 1758–1762	Succeeded by William Crosbie
