= High Sheriff of Kerry =

British crown official in Ireland

The High Sheriff of Kerry was the British Crown's judicial representative in County Kerry, Ireland from the 16th century until 1922, when the office was abolished in the new Free State and replaced by the office of Kerry County Sheriff. The sheriff had judicial, electoral, ceremonial and administrative functions and executed High Court Writs. In 1908, an Order in Council made the Lord-Lieutenant the Sovereign's prime representative in a county and reduced the High Sheriff's precedence. However, the sheriff retained his responsibilities for the preservation of law and order in the county. The usual procedure for appointing the sheriff from 1660 onwards was that three persons were nominated at the beginning of each year from the county and the Lord Lieutenant then appointed his choice as High Sheriff for the remainder of the year. Often the other nominees were appointed as under-sheriffs. Sometimes a sheriff did not fulfil his entire term through death or other event and another sheriff was then appointed for the remainder of the year. The dates given hereunder are the dates of appointment. All addresses are in County Kerry unless stated otherwise.

== High Sheriffs of County Kerry ==
- 1311: Richard Brun
- 1565: Fyneen mac Teige-Mer-Gagh O'Mahony, seneschal of Desmond, became high sheriff when Donald Mc Carthy Mor lost his title of king of Desmond for the one of earl of Clancare
- 1585: Ralph Lane
- 1585: Maurice O'Connell
- 1588: Edward Denny of Tralee Castle
- 1592: Thomas Spring of Castlemaine
- 1602: Walter Hussey of Moyle and Dingle
- 1607: Dermod Mac Fyneen O'Mahony of Knockreer and Knockavota
- 1609: Walter Spring of Castlemaine and Killagha Abbey
- 1614: Geoffrey O'Connell
- 1622: Robert Blennerhassett of Tralee
- 1623: Sir Valentine Browne, 1st Baronet
- 1634: Sir Edward Denny, Kt of Tralee Castle
- 1638: Turlogh Mac Mahon
- 1639: Daniel Mac Dermot O'Mahony of Knockreer
- 1641: Sir Thomas Harris
- 1641: John Blennerhassett of Ballyseedy, Tralee
- 1642: Edward Blennerhassett of Ballycarty Castle
- 1650: Son of Lord Roche (shot at Macroom Castle)
- 1654: Sir Thomas Southwell, 1st Baronet (also Sheriff of Clare and Limerick)
- 1656: Arthur Denny of Tralee Castle
- 1658: John Blennerhassett of Ballyseedy, Tralee
- 1659: Thomas Herbert
- 1660: Rowland Bateman
- 1660: Patrick Crosbie of Tubrid
- 1661: Thomas Crosbie of Ardfert
- 1663: John Blennerhassett of Tralee
- 1668: Sir Thomas Crosbie of Ardfert
- 1669: Rowland Bateman of Killeen
- 1671: William Naper
- 1679: Thomas Blennerhassett of Letter
- 1682: Robert Blennerhassett of Killorglin
- 1683: Captain William Reeves
- 1683: David Crosbie
- 1685: Henry Stoughton
- 1686: Donogh Mac Gillicuddy
- 1688: John Browne replaced by Teige O'Mahony via letters patent on June 24, 1688
- 1693: Edward Herbert
- 1695: Barry Denny
- 1699: William Crosbie

== 18th century ==
- 1700: Edward Sewell
- 1706: Maurice Fitzgerald
- 1708: Edward Herbert
- 1709: Honourable John Fitzmaurice
- 1712: Rowland Bateman
- 1712: Thomas Crosbie
- 1714: Thomas Crosbie
- 1715: John Carrique
- 1716: George Rowan
- 1717: John Blennerhassett of Ballyseedy
- 1718: Jasper Morris
- 1719: Francis Maynard
- 1721: Arthur Crosbie
- 1722: James Leslie
- 1723: Edward Denny Jnr.
- 1731: James Carrique Ponsonby
- 1732: John Petty, 1st Earl of Shelburne
- 1734: John Fitzgerald
- 1735: William Godfrey
- 1736: William Meredith
- 1737: George Herbert
- 1738: John Markham
- 1739: William Blennerhassett
- 1740: John Blennerhassett of Ballyseedy
- 1741: Arthur Denny
- 1742: Arthur Herbert Jnr.
- 1743: William Crosbie
- 1744: Theophilus Morris
- 1745: John Wren of Letter
- 1746: Robert Leslie
- 1747: Anthony Staughton
- 1748: Frederick Mullins
- 1749: Thomas Amory Mac Mahon
- 1750: William Carrique of Cloghers
- 1751: James Crosbie of Ballyheigue Castle
- 1752: Lancelot Crosbie
- 1754: John Godfrey
- 1755: William Raymond
- 1756: Maurice FitzGerald, 16th Knight of Kerry
- 1757: Francis Chute
- 1757: Francis Crosbie
- 1758: Rowland Bateman
- 1759: Thomas Mullins
- 1760: George Rowan
- 1761: William Blennerhassett of Ballyseedy
- 1762: John Gun
- 1763: Samuel Morris
- 1764: George Gunn, of Carrickafoyle
- 1765: James Hickson
- 1766: Richard Meredith
- 1767: Francis Crosbie
- 1768: William T. Gun
- 1769: George Rowan Jnr.
- 1770: John Gustavus Crosbie
- 1771: William Collis
- 1772: John Sealy
- 1773: Samuel Raymond
- 1774: Gustavus Adolphus Freke Crosbie
- 1774: Sir Barry Denny, 1st Baronet
- 1775: William Sandes
- 1776: John Stack
- 1777: Thomas Wren
- 1778: Robert Hickson
- 1779: Pierse Crosbie of Ballyheigue Castle
- 1780: William Godfrey, later Sir William Godfrey, 1st Baronet of Bushfield
- 1781: James Carrique Ponsonby
- 1782: Denis Mahony
- 1783: George Cashel of Castlemorris
- 1784: John Markham of Fort George
- 1785: Richard Orpen of Ardtully
- 1786: Richard Chute
- 1787: Arthur Herbert
- 1788: George Gun
- 1789: Edward Nash
- 1790: Edward Orpen
- 1791: Stephen Edward Rice
- 1792: James Crosbie of Ballyheigue Castle
- 1793: Richard Mac Gillicuddy
- 1794: Sir Barry Denny, 2nd Baronet, shot in a duel – Robert Fitzjohn Hickson appointed instead.
- 1794: Sir Edward Denny, 3rd Baronet
- 1795: George Sandes of Listowel
- 1796: Edward Collis
- 1797: William Ponsonby
- 1798: John Collis
- 1799: Ralph Marshall

== 19th century ==
- 1800: John Mahony
- 1801: John Godfrey
- 1802: George Twiss died and his son Robert Twiss was appointed instead.
- 1803: William Meredith
- 1804: Thomas William Sandes
- 1805: John Rowan
- 1806: Francis Christopher Bland of Derryquin Castle
- 1807: George Rowan of Rathanny
- 1808: Robert Day
- 1809: Townsend Gun
- 1810: Samuel Sealy
- 1811: Robert Conway Hickson
- 1812: Barry William Gun
- 1813: Daniel Mac Gillicuddy
- 1814: Robert Leslie Jnr.
- 1815: Pierce Crosbie of Ballyheigue Castle
- 1816: William Collis
- 1817: Richard Orpen Townsend
- 1818: Charles Herbert
- 1819: John Bateman of Oak Park
- 1820: Arthur Blennerhassett afterwards Sir Arthur Blennerhassett, 3rd Baronet of Churchtown
- 1821: Arthur Blennerhassett of Ballyseedy, Tralee
- 1822: Francis Chute of Spring Hill
- 1823: Sir Robert Blennerhassett, 2nd Baronet.
- 1824: Richard Mac Gillicuddy
- 1825: Richard Mahony of Dunmore.
- 1826: Captain John Hickson of Dingle.
- 1827: Sir Edward Denny, 4th Baronet of Tralee Castle, Tralee.
- 1828: William Sandes, of Sallowglin, Tarbert.
- 1829: Sir Thomas Herbert
- 1829: William Duncan Godfrey, later Sir William Godfrey, 3rd Baronet
- 1830: Daniel Cronin (first Roman Catholic Sheriff after the Emancipation Act)
- 1831: Thomas afterwards Sir Thomas Herbert
- 1832: Hon. William Browne of Woodlawn.
- 1833: Charles George Fairfield of Castle-island
- 1834: William Townsend Gun.
- 1835: James Franklin Bland of Derryquin Castle.
- 1836: Henry Arthur Herbert.
- 1837: Hon. Thomas Browne of Prospect Hill.
- 1838: Thomas Anthony Stoughton of Ballyhorgan.
- 1839: John O'Connell of Grena, Killarney, of Kilboyne House.
- 1840: Denis Shine Lawlor.
- 1841: Daniel Mahony.
- 1842: Arthur Lloyd Saunders.
- 1843: John Coltsmann of Fleck Castle.
- 1844: Pierce K. Mahony Jnr of Kilmorna and Gunsboro.
- 1845: Christopher Galwey of Killarney.
- 1846: Wilson Gun.
- 1847: Daniel Cronin-Coltsmann of Fleck Castle.
- 1848: William Talbot Talbot-Crosbie
- 1849: Sir Peter FitzGerald, 19th Knight of Kerry.
- 1850: Sir Maurice James O'Connell, 2nd Baronet of Lakeview, Killarney.
- 1851: Valentine Augustus Browne, 4th Earl of Kenmare.
- 1852: Dayrolles Blakeney Eveleigh–de–Moleyns, 4th Baron Ventry of Burnham House (Ballingolin).
- 1853: Richard John Mahony.
- 1854: William Hickie.
- 1855: Robert Conway Hickson.
- 1856: Richard Chute.
- 1857: Edward Hussey.
- 1858: Charles John Allanson Winn Blennerhassett of Ballyseedy.
- 1859: Francis Christopher Bland of Derryquin Castle.
- 1860: Daniel O'Connell.
- 1861: John Fermor Godfrey, later Sir John Godfrey, 4th Baronet.
- 1862: James Crosbie.
- 1863: Robert Leslie.
- 1864: John Morrogh Bernard. of Old Court, Cork.
- 1865: Francis Blennerhasset Chute of Chute Hall.
- 1866: Sir Rowland Blennerhassett, 4th Baronet.
- 1867: Nicholas Donovan.
- 1868: Daniel James O'Connell.
- 1869: Samuel Murray Hussey.
- 1870: Edward Joseph Morrogh-Bernard.
- 1871: Townsend G. Gun.
- 1872: William Creagh Hickie.
- 1873: Sir Henry Donovan, of Clogher's House, Seafield, Tralee.
- 1874: Maurice Fitzgerald Sandes, Esq., Oakpark, Tralee.
- 1875: John Moore Mahony.
- 1876: George Philip Gun.
- 1877: John White Leahy.
- 1878: Major Arthur Blennerhassett of Ballyseedy.
- 1879: Henry Herbert of Cahirnane, Currens.
- 1880: John Edward Hussey.
- 1881: Henry Arthur Herbert, late of Muckross House.
- 1882: Falkiner Sandes Collis-Sandes of Oak Park House, Tralee.
- 1883:
- 1884:
- 1885: Thomas William Sandes of Sallow Glen, Tarbert.
- 1886: Richard Meredith of Dicksgrove, Farranfore.
- 1887: George Sandes of Greeville.
- 1888: John Charles Dennis Hurly of Fenit House.
- 1889: George Robert Browne.
- 1890: Major Markham Richard Leeson-Marshall of Callinafercy.
- 1891: Sir Daniel Ross O'Connell, 3rd Baronet.
- 1892: John MacGillycuddy
- 1892: James Edward Butler.
- 1893: John McGillycuddy Esq. of Aghadoe House, Killarney.
- 1894: James Dayrolles Crosbie.
- 1895: Sir John Charles Ready Colomb
- 1896: Col. Harrison Trent-Stoughton of Ballyhorgan, Lixnaw.
- 1897: Frederick Reginald Bateman of Bedford House, County Kerry/
- 1898: Major William John Nelligan, Churchill, Tralee.
- 1899: Daniel John Cronin-Coltsmann of Fleck Castle.

== 20th century ==
- 1900: Arthur Stewart Herbert, of Cahirnane.
- 1901: Richard Justice Rice of Bushmount, Lixnaw.
- 1902: William Townsend Jackson Gun, of Rattoo, Lixnaw.
- 1903: Lindsey Bertie Talbot-Crosbie.
- 1904:
- 1905: Maxwell Vandeleur Blacker-Douglass, of Tullahinel, Ballylongford and of Elm Park, County Armagh.
- 1906:
- 1907: Sir Morgan Ross O'Connell, 4th Baronet.
- 1908: Samuel Thomas Heard of Rossdohan.
- 1909: St John Henry Donovan of Seafield Spa, Tralee.
- 1910: Robert John FitzGerald.
- 1911: Cecil Rowland Leslie of Tarbert House.
- 1912: Samuel Trant McCarthy, of Srugrena Abbey.
- 1913: Lt-Col. Charles Wallace Warden, of Derryquin Castle.
- 1914: Captain Richard Aremberg Blennerhassett Chute, Chute Hall, Tralee
- 1915: Daniel Charles O'Connell
- 1916: Arthur Rose Vincent, DL, JP, Muckross Abbey, Killarney
- 1917: Rupert Palmer Colomb, Esq., of Dromquinna, Kenmare.
- 1918: Edward Hood.
- 1919: Captain Sir John Peter Gerald Maurice Fitzgerald, Baronet, Knight of Kerry of Glanleam, Valentia.
- 1920: Anthony John MacGillicuddy.
- 1921:
- 1922: Lt-Col. H G Leahy OBE.
