= Lancelot Crosbie =

18th century Anglo-Irish politician

Lancelot Crosbie (1723 – August 1780) was an Anglo-Irish politician.

== Biography ==
He was the son of Maurice Crosbie of Ballykealy and Catherine Sandes. He lived at Tubrid House, Ardfert, County Kerry. He entered the Middle Temple in 1743.

Crosbie served in the Irish House of Commons as the Member of Parliament for County Kerry between 1759 and 1760. He then represented Ardfert from 1762 to 1776, with the backing of his first wife's family, the Crosbies.

His first wife was Hon. Elizabeth Crosbie, daughter of Maurice Crosbie, 1st Baron Brandon and Lady Elizabeth Fitzmaurice. The couple were distant cousins. They had no children. By his second wife Mary Blennerhassett, daughter of Colonel John Blennerhassett and Jane Denny, he was the father of three children, including John Gustavus Crosbie. John, like his father, was MP for Kerry. In 1794 he caused a scandal by killing the sitting MP, Sir Barry Denny, 2nd Baronet, in a duel. His own sudden death three years later was widely rumoured to be a revenge killing by the Dennys.

Parliament of Ireland
Preceded by John Blennerhassett; Sir Maurice Crosbie	Member of Parliament for County Kerry; 1759 – 1760; With: John Blennerhassett	Succeeded by Viscount FitzMaurice; John Blennerhassett
Preceded by William Crosbie; Maurice Copinger	Member of Parliament for Ardfert; 1762 – 1776; With: Maurice Copinger	Succeeded by Viscount FitzMaurice; Viscount Crosbie
