= Thomas Fitzmaurice (MP) =

British politician

The Honourable Thomas Fitzmaurice (July 1742 - 28 October 1793) was a Member of Parliament for Calne from 1762 to 1774, and then for Chipping Wycome until 1780.

== Early life and family ==
Fitzmaurice was the younger son of John Petty, 1st Earl of Shelburne. His father was the second surviving son of Thomas Fitzmaurice, 1st Earl of Kerry, and his wife Anne Petty, daughter of Sir William Petty. His father changed his surname in 1751 on inheriting the estates of his uncle, Henry Petty, 1st Earl of Shelburne, and was himself created Viscount Fitzmaurice in 1751 and Earl of Shelburne in 1753. His elder brother William was an MP before he inherited the family titles on his father's death in 1761; he later became Prime Minister of Great Britain in 1782 and was created Marquess of Lansdowne in 1784. His brother changed his surname to Petty, but Thomas retained the Fitzmaurice name.

Fitzmaurice was educated at Eton College.

From 1759 to 1761, as a student, Thomas boarded with the philosopher and economist Adam Smith who was teaching at Glasgow University.

== Career ==
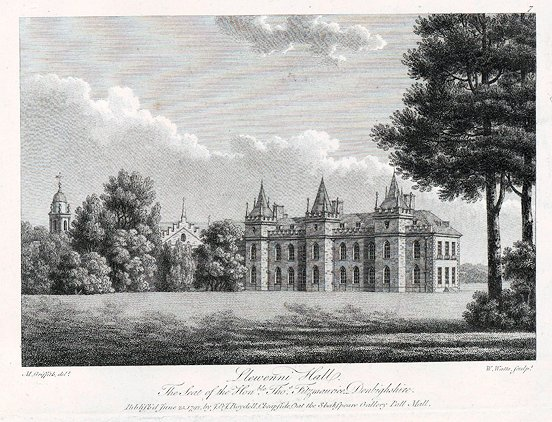
Lleweni Hall, 1792

He was called to the bar at Middle Temple. In 1777 he married Mary O'Brien (1755-1831), who became suo jure 4th Countess of Orkney in 1791. Their son, born in 1778, was John Fitzmaurice, Viscount Kirkwall; he died before his mother, but Viscount Kirkwall was the father of the 5th Earl of Orkney, Thomas John Hamilton Fitzmaurice.

Thomas and William Fitzmaurice enjoyed a close relationship, both as brothers and in parliament where Thomas "naturally followed his brother's lead". William briefly served as MP for Chipping Wycome in 1760–61. After William was elevated to the House of Lords, he arranged for Thomas to replace Isaac Barré as Member of Parliament for Calne in December 1762. In 1763 he was also elected to the Irish House of Commons for County Kerry, but continued to spend most of his time in England. Thomas represented Calne unopposed until 1774, when he moved to Chipping Wycome, another rotten borough controlled by his brother, exchanging seats with Barré. However, whereas William eventually became Prime Minister of Great Britain, Thomas Fitzmaurice had left Parliament by 1780, replaced in Chipping Wycome by Charles Stanhope.

In 1776 Fitzmaurice bought the Lleweni Hall estate in Denbighshire from Sir Robert Cotton for £110,000, where he established a large, Palladian-style factory, 400 feet (120 m) long, to bleach linen from his Irish estates. He was High Sheriff of Denbighshire in 1781-2 and High Sheriff of Flintshire in 1783. He sought a private prosecution of William Davies Shipley, Dean of St Asaph, for seditious libel, for publishing a leaflet advocating political reforms in 1783, leading to the notorious case of the Dean of St Asaph.

== Later life ==
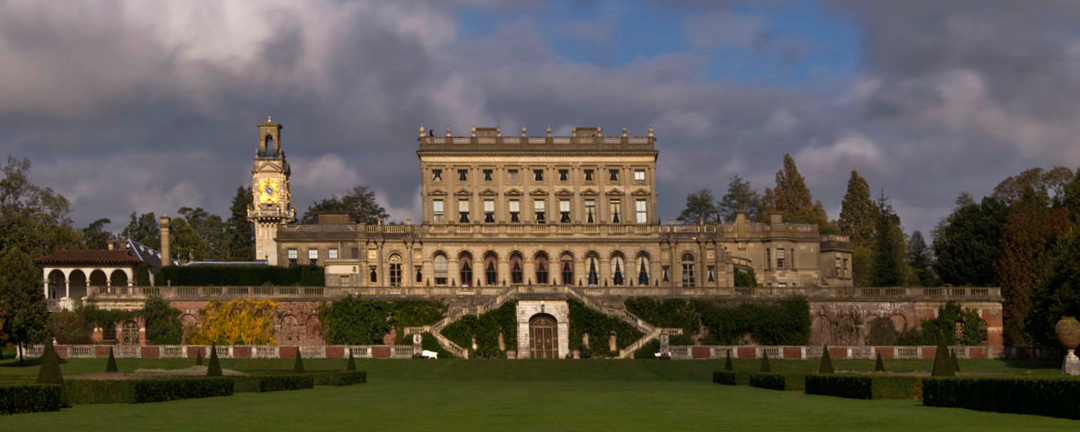
Cliveden House in Buckinghamshire

His wife succeeded as Countess of Orkney in 1791, and they moved to Cliveden. He died in Hampshire.

== Sources ==
- http://www.historyofparliamentonline.org/volume/1754-1790/member/fitzmaurice-hon-thomas-1742-93
- http://www.cpat.org.uk/projects/longer/histland/clwyd/1053.htm
- History of parliament; the House of Commons 1784 -1790 L.Namier and J Brooke. Published Boydell and Brewer 1964
