= Arthur Blennerhassett =

Arthur Blennerhassett may refer to:

- Arthur Blennerhassett (1687–1758), Anglo-Irish MP and lawyer
- Arthur Blennerhassett (1719–1799), Anglo-Irish MP for Tralee and Kerry
- Arthur Blennerhassett (1799–1843), Anglo-Irish MP for Kerry
- Sir Arthur Blennerhassett, 3rd Baronet (1794–1849), of the Blennerhassett baronets
- Sir Arthur Blennerhassett, 5th Baronet (1871–1915), of the Blennerhassett baronets

== See also ==
- Blennerhassett (disambiguation)
