= Marmaduke Blennerhassett =

Marmaduke Blennerhassett may refer to:

- Sir Marmaduke Charles Henry Joseph Blennerhassett, 6th Baronet (1902–1940) of the Blennerhassett Baronets
- Sir (Marmaduke) Adrian Francis William Blennerhassett, 7th Baronet (1940–2022) of the Blennerhassett Baronets

== See also ==
- Blennerhassett (disambiguation)
