= Rowland Blennerhassett =

Rowland Blennerhassett may refer to:

- Sir Rowland Blennerhassett, 1st Baronet (1741–1821), Anglo-Irish lawyer
- Sir Rowland Blennerhassett, 4th Baronet (1839–1909), Anglo-Irish MP for Galway Borough 1865–1874 and Kerry 1880–1885
- Rowland Ponsonby Blennerhassett (1850–1913), Irish MP for Kerry 1872–1885
- Rowland Blennerhassett (priest) (1919–2009), Archdeacon of Tuam from 1956 to 1969

== See also ==
- Blennerhassett (disambiguation)
