= Arthur Denny =

Arthur Denny may refer to:

- Arthur Denny (politician, born 1629) (1629–1673), Anglo-Irish politician
- Arthur Denny (politician, born 1704) (1704–1742), Irish politician
- Arthur A. Denny (1822–1899), one of the founders of Seattle, Washington
