= Sir William Godfrey, 3rd Baronet =

Anglo-Irish aristocrat and landowner

Sir William Duncan Godfrey, 3rd Baronet JP DL (1797–1873) was an Anglo-Irish aristocrat and landowner.

Sir William Godfrey was born at Kilcolman Abbey, Milltown on the family estate in County Kerry, Ireland. He was the son of Sir John Godfrey, 2nd Baronet. He was sent to England for his education, attending Westminster School. He subsequently studied at an academy in Geneva, before embarking on the Grand Tour.

Despite his cosmopolitan upbringing, Godfrey returned to Ireland following his travels in Europe, and remained in County Kerry for most of his life. He was appointed a Justice of the Peace in 1822 and became a captain of the Milltown Infantry contingent in 1824. He was sworn in as High Sheriff of Kerry in 1829. At the insistence of his friend, Valentine Browne, 2nd Earl of Kenmare, Godfrey was made a Deputy Lieutenant for Kerry in 1832.

Throughout the 1830s, Sir William Godfrey managed the estates of both his brother-in-law, John Coltsmann of Flesk Castle and that of his cousin, Arthur Blennerhassett of Ballyseedy. He was an avid farmer, and unlike many Anglo-Irish landowners, he took a keen interest in his estate and tenants. He was recognised by the Royal Agricultural Improvement Society of Ireland for his promotion and use of advanced farming techniques. Politically, Godfrey aligned himself with the liberal wing of the Conservative Party, although he never stood for elected office. He was known to be sympathetic towards Catholic emancipation. During the Irish famine of the 1840s, Godfrey organised and chaired several local relief committees. In May 1846, Sir William purchased a large quantity of Indian meal to bridge the period before the first potato crops became available. He lobbied the government in London on numerous occasions, warning in October 1846 that, "the people have endured their wants & privations with resignation and patience but if employment and relief are delayed much longer, the peace & tranquillity of this district must be seriously endangered."

Godfrey was a stalwart and committed supporter of the established Anglican Church of Ireland although his wife, Mary Teresa, was a devout Roman Catholic. The couple had ten children and in a family compromise, the boys were raised as Anglicans and the girls as Roman Catholics. He was succeeded in his title by his eldest son, John Fermor Godfrey.

In 1850, in Milltown, County Kerry, Godfrey's daughter Christina married Richard Wood, British consul in Damascus, and their descendants include the Wheler baronets.

Baronetage of Ireland
Preceded by John Godfrey	Baronet (of Bushfield); 1841–1873	Succeeded by John Fermor Godfrey
