= Rowland Bateman =

Irish politician

Rowland Bateman (circa 1737 – 1803) was an Irish politician.

Bateman represented Tralee as a Member of Parliament in the Irish House of Commons between 1761 and 1768. He then sat for County Kerry from 1776 to 1783.

Parliament of Ireland
Preceded by John Blennerhassett; Arthur Blennerhassett	Member of Parliament for Tralee; 1761–1768; With: Edward Herbert	Succeeded by Edward Denny; Edward Herbert
Preceded by Barry Denny; Arthur Blennerhassett	Member of Parliament for County Kerry; 1776–1783; With: Arthur Blennerhassett	Succeeded by Sir Barry Denny, Bt. Richard Townsend Herbert
