= Churchfield =

Churchfield can refer to

- Churchfield Road in Acton, London, England
- Churchfield, County Mayo a townland in County Mayo, Ireland
- Churchfield, County Cork in County Cork, Ireland
