= John Petty, 1st Earl of Shelburne =

Anglo-Irish peer and politician

The Earl of Shelburne PC (Ire)

Member of the Dublin Parliament for Member of Parliament for County Kerry
- In office 1743–1751 Serving with Sir Maurice Crosbie
- Preceded by: Sir Maurice Crosbie; Arthur Denny
- Succeeded by: Sir Maurice Crosbie; John Blennerhassett

Member of the Great Britain Parliament for Member of Parliament for Wycombe
- In office 1754–1760 Serving with: John Waller 1754–1757; Edmund Waller 1757–1760
- Preceded by: Edmund Waller; Edmund Waller
- Succeeded by: Edmund Waller; Viscount FitzMaurice

Personal details
- Born: John FitzMaurice; 1706
- Died: 14 May 1761 (age 55)
- Resting place: Bowood, Wiltshire, England
- Spouse: Mary FitzMaurice (m. 1734)
- Children: Thomas FitzMaurice; William Petty, 2nd Earl of Shelburne
- Parent: Thomas FitzMaurice, 1st Earl of Kerry (father)

John Petty Fitzmaurice, 1st Earl of Shelburne PC (Ire) (1706 – 14 May 1761), known as John FitzMaurice until 1751 and as The Viscount FitzMaurice between 1751 and 1753, was an Anglo-Irish peer and politician. He was the father of William Petty FitzMaurice, Prime Minister of Great Britain from 1782 to 1783.

== Life ==
Born John FitzMaurice, Lord Shelburne was the second son of Thomas FitzMaurice, 1st Earl of Kerry, and Anne, daughter of Sir William Petty (1623–1687). He was the younger brother of William FitzMaurice, 2nd Earl of Kerry, and the nephew of Charles Petty, 1st Baron Shelburne and Henry Petty, 1st Earl of Shelburne. He was educated at Westminster School and was called to the Bar, Middle Temple, in 1727.

FitzMaurice's Name Act 1750
- Act of Parliament
- Parliament of Great Britain
- Long title: An Act to enable the Honourable John Fitz Maurice and his Issue to take and use the Surname of Petty, pursuant to the Will of the Right Honourable Henry Earl of Shelburne in the Kingdom of Ireland, deceased.
- Citation: 24 Geo. 2. c. 43 Pr.
- Territorial extent: Great Britain

Dates
- Royal assent: 25 June 1751
- Commencement: 17 January 1751 (Note: Start of session.)

Status: Current legislation

In 1751 he succeeded to the estates of his uncle the Earl of Shelburne (who had died childless) and assumed by a private act of Parliament, FitzMaurice's Name Act 1750 (24 Geo. 2. c. 43 Pr.), the surname of Petty in lieu of his patronymic. Later the same year he was raised to the Peerage of Ireland as Baron Dunkeron and Viscount FitzMaurice. Two years later the earldom of Shelburne was revived in his favour when he was made Earl of Shelburne, in the County of Wexford, in the Irish peerage.

In 1754 he bought Bowood Park, an estate between Chippenham and Calne in Wiltshire, and rebuilt the mansion there.

=== Political career ===
FitzMaurice was High Sheriff of Kerry in 1732. In 1743 he entered the Irish House of Commons as one of two representatives for County Kerry, a seat he held until 1751.

He was Governor of County Kerry in 1754 and the same year he was returned to the British House of Commons for Wycombe, a seat he held until 1760. He was sworn of the Irish Privy Council in 1754 and in 1760 he was created Lord Wycombe, Baron of Chipping Wycombe, in the County of Buckingham, in the Peerage of Great Britain, which entitled him to a seat in the English House of Lords.

== Family ==
Lord Shelburne married his first cousin, Mary, daughter of the Hon. William FitzMaurice, in 1734. Their younger son the Hon. Thomas FitzMaurice married Mary O'Brien, later suo jure Countess of Orkney. Lord Shelburne died in May 1761 and was buried in Bowood, Wiltshire. He was succeeded in the earldom by his eldest son, William, who became Prime Minister of Great Britain and was created Marquess of Lansdowne in 1784. The Countess of Shelburne died in 1780.

== Notes ==
Parliament of Ireland
Preceded by Sir Maurice Crosbie; Arthur Denny	Member of Parliament for County Kerry; 1743–1751; With: Sir Maurice Crosbie	Succeeded by Sir Maurice Crosbie; John Blennerhassett
Parliament of Great Britain
Preceded by Edmund Waller; Edmund Waller	Member of Parliament for Wycombe; 1754–1760; With: John Waller 1754–1757; Edmund Waller 1757–1760	Succeeded by Edmund Waller; Viscount FitzMaurice
Peerage of Ireland
New creation	Earl of Shelburne; 1753–1761	Succeeded by William Petty
New creation	Viscount FitzMaurice; 1751–1761	Succeeded by William Petty
Peerage of Great Britain
New creation	Baron Wycombe; 1760–1761	Succeeded by William Petty
