= Portrait of Isaac Barré =

Painting by Gilbert Stuart

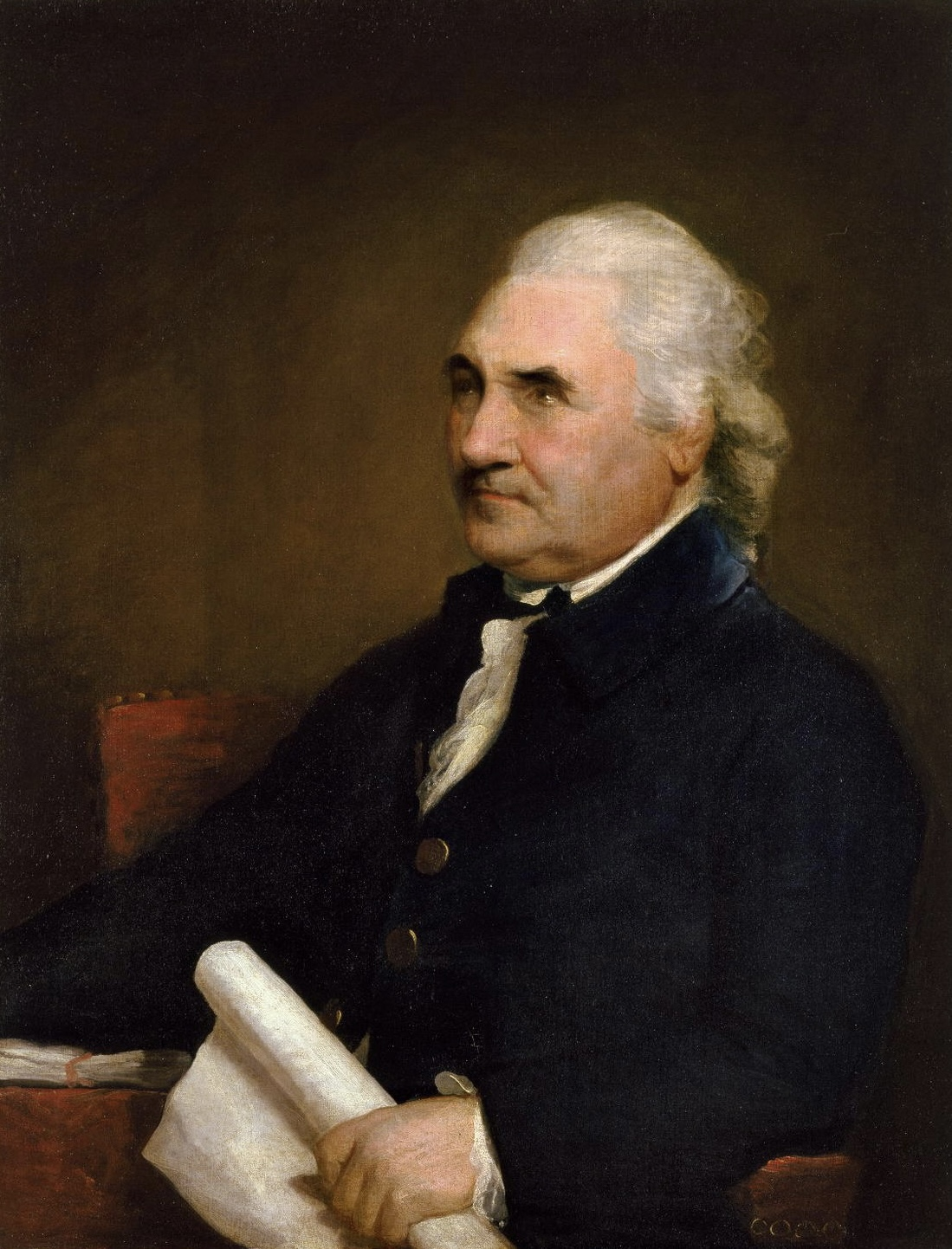
- Artist: Gilbert Stuart
- Year: 1785
- Type: Oil on canvas, portrait painting
- Dimensions: 91 cm × 70.5 cm (36 in × 27.8 in)
- Location: Brooklyn Museum, New York City

Portrait of Isaac Barré is a 1785 portrait painting by the American artist Gilbert Stuart depicting the Irish politician and soldier Isaac Barré.

Born in Dublin, Barré served in the British Army and was wounded during the Taking of Quebec in 1759. He sat in the British House of Commons from 1761 and had relatively recently served as Paymaster of the Forces in the government of Lord Shelburne when he sat for the painting. A noted opponent of the Stamp Act, he coined the expression "Sons of Liberty" to describe the American colonists who resisted it. The city of Wilkes-Barre in Pennsylvania was co-named after him and John Wilkes, as were Barre, Massachusetts; Barre, New York; Barre, Vermont; and Barre, Wisconsin.

Stuart lived and worked in London and Dublin between 1775 and 1793. The painting was likely commissioned by Barré to support the financially-struggling artist. It uses heavy shadow to conceal the face wound the Irishman had received from a French musket ball at Quebec. Barré ordered three portraits from Stuart at the time. One of the versions was commissioned as a gift to the Earl of St Vincent. Stuart planned to display it at the Royal Academy's Summer Exhibition of 1786, but chose not to exhibit that year. It is now in the possession of the Brooklyn Museum in New York City. Another replica version is in the collection of the National Portrait Gallery in London, while a third is at the Yale Center for British Art.

== Bibliography ==
- Alexander, John K. Samuel Adams: The Life of an American Revolutionary. Rowman & Littlefield Publishers, 2011.
- Barratt, Carrie Rebora & Miles, Ellen G. Gilbert Stuart. Metropolitan Museum of Art, 2004.
- Carbone, Teresa A. American Paintings in the Brooklyn Museum: Artists Born by 1876, Volume 1. Brooklyn Museum, 2006.
- Staiti, Paul. Of Arms and Artists: The American Revolution through Painters' Eyes. Bloomsbury Publishing USA, 2016.
