= John Hassett (disambiguation) =

John Hassett (died 1955) was an Irish politician.

John Hassett may also refer to:

- Buddy Hassett (1911–1997), American baseball player
- John Blennerhassett (landowner), (1521–1573), English landowner known also as John Hassett
- Johnny Hassett (1891–1972), Australian rules footballer
