= Thomas Crosbie =

Anglo-Irish soldier and politician (died 1694)

Sir Thomas Crosbie (died 7 February 1694), also recorded as Crosby, was an Anglo-Irish soldier and politician.

Crosbie was the eldest son of David Crosbie of Ardfert, a Protestant planter whose family had moved to County Kerry in the early seventeenth century. His paternal grandfather was Bishop John Crosbie. His mother was a daughter of Bishop John Steere.

Crosbie served as an ensign in the army of the Commonwealth of England, rising eventually to the rank of lieutenant in a troop of horse. He participated in the Cromwellian conquest of Ireland as a "known enemy of the Confederate Catholics". After the Stuart Restoration, Crosbie, who inherited the family estate in 1658, was included in the general pardon granted to supporters of Cromwell. He was appointed High Sheriff of Kerry in 1661 and 1668. On 1 May 1664, he was appointed by the Duke of Ormond to manage the affairs of the Dublin Castle administration in Kerry and Cork, and was knighted for his services. In 1678 he was made a commissioner for disarming Roman Catholics in Kerry.

During the Williamite War in Ireland, Crosbie supported James II and received a commission in his army on 27 July 1689. He is recorded as being a captain in Brigadier Francis Carroll's Dragoons. He was one of only six Protestants to attend the Patriot Parliament in 1689, as a Member of Parliament for County Kerry. Crosbie and his family were again pardoned following the victory of Williamite forces in 1691 and he was able to retain possession of his estates.

He married firstly Bridget Tynte, by whom he had six children, secondly Garrett Fitzgerald, and thirdly Elizabeth Hamilton. His eldest son and heir by his first marriage was David Crosbie, the father of Maurice Crosbie, 1st Baron Brandon.

Parliament of Ireland
Preceded by John Blennerhassett; Arthur Denny	Member of Parliament for County Kerry; 1689; With: Nicholas Brown	Succeeded by Edward Denny; Hon. Thomas FitzMaurice
