= William Petty, 2nd Earl of Shelburne =

Prime Minister of Great Britain from 1782 to 1783

The Most Honourable The Marquess of Lansdowne KG PC
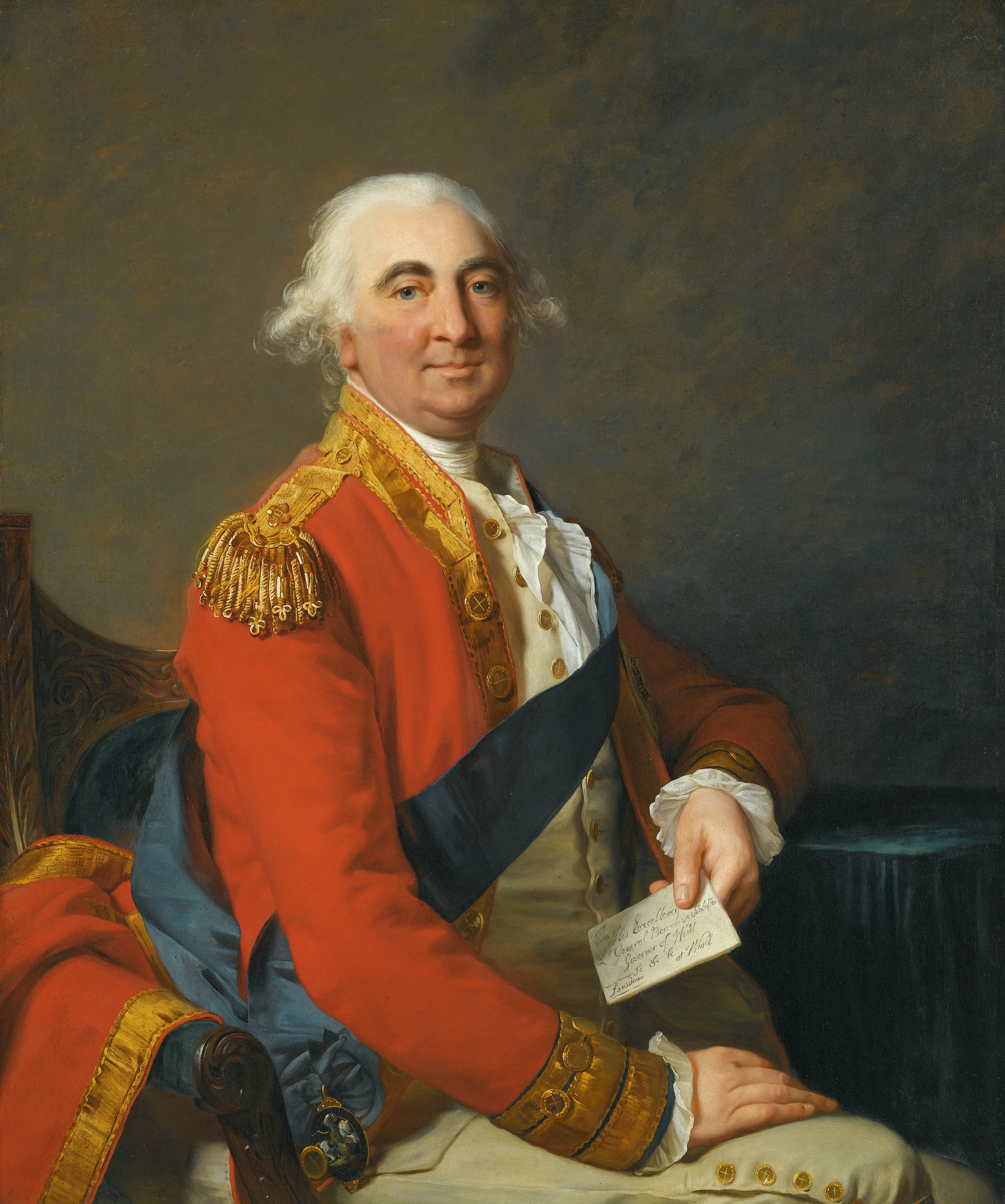
- Portrait by Jean-Laurent Mosnier, 1791

Prime Minister of Great Britain
- In office 4 July 1782 – 26 March 1783
- Monarch: George III
- Preceded by: The Marquess of Rockingham
- Succeeded by: The Duke of Portland

Leader of the House of Lords
- In office 27 March 1782 – 2 April 1783
- Prime Minister: The Marquess of Rockingham; Himself
- Preceded by: The Viscount Stormont
- Succeeded by: The Duke of Portland

Home Secretary
- In office 27 March 1782 – 10 July 1782
- Prime Minister: The Marquess of Rockingham Himself
- Preceded by: The Earl of Hillsborough (Southern Secretary)
- Succeeded by: Thomas Townshend

Secretary of State for the Southern Department
- In office 30 July 1766 – 20 October 1768
- Prime Minister: The Earl of Chatham; The Duke of Grafton
- Preceded by: The Duke of Richmond
- Succeeded by: The Viscount Weymouth

Personal details
- Born: 2 May 1737 Dublin, Ireland
- Died: 7 May 1805 (aged 68) Westminster, England
- Resting place: All Saints Churchyard, High Wycombe, England
- Party: Whig
- Spouses: Sophia Carteret (m. 1765; died 1771); Louisa FitzPatrick (m. 1779; died 1789)
- Children: 3, including John and Henry
- Parent: John Petty, 1st Earl of Shelburne (father)
- Education: Christ Church, Oxford

Military service
- Allegiance: Great Britain
- Branch/service: British Army
- Rank: General
- Battles/wars: Seven Years' War

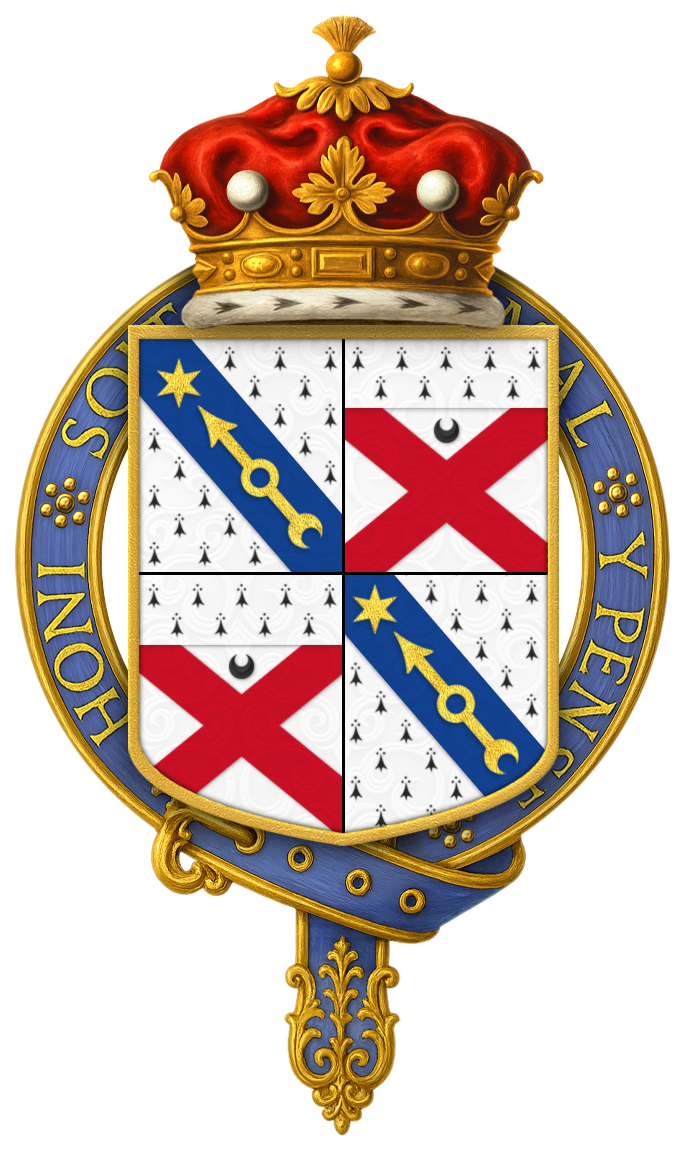
Coat of arms of William Petty, 1st Marquess of Lansdowne, KG

William Petty Fitzmaurice, 1st Marquess of Lansdowne (2 May 1737 – 7 May 1805), known as the Earl of Shelburne between 1761 and 1784, by which title he is generally known to history, was an Anglo-Irish Whig statesman who was the first home secretary in 1782 and then prime minister in 1782–83 during the final months of the American War of Independence. He succeeded in securing peace with America and this feat remains his most notable legacy.

Lord Shelburne was born in Dublin and spent his formative years in Ireland. After attending Oxford University, he served in the British Army during the Seven Years' War. As a reward for his conduct at the Battle of Kloster Kampen, Shelburne was appointed an aide-de-camp to George III. He became involved in politics, becoming a member of parliament in 1760. After his father's death in 1761, he inherited his title and entered the House of Lords.

In 1766, Shelburne was appointed as Southern Secretary, a position which he held for two years. He departed office during the Corsican Crisis and joined the Opposition. Following the fall of the North government, Shelburne joined its replacement under Lord Rockingham. Shelburne was made prime minister in 1782 following Rockingham's death, with the American War still being fought.

He lost his authority and influence after being driven out of office at the age of 45 in 1783. Shelburne lamented that his career had been a failure, despite the many high offices he held over 17 years, and his undoubted abilities as a debater. He blamed his poor education—although it was as good as that of most peers—and said the real problem was that "it has been my fate through life to fall in with clever but unpopular connections".

== Early life ==
The future Marquess of Lansdowne was born William Fitzmaurice in Dublin, the first son of John Fitzmaurice, who was the second surviving son of the 1st Earl of Kerry. Lord Kerry had married Anne Petty, the daughter of Sir William Petty, Surveyor General of Ireland, whose elder son had been created Baron Shelburne in 1688 and (on the elder son's death) whose younger son had been created Baron Shelburne in 1699 and Earl of Shelburne in 1719.

On the younger son's death, the Petty estates passed to the aforementioned John Fitzmaurice, who changed his branch of the family's surname to "Petty" in place of "Fitzmaurice", and was created Viscount Fitzmaurice later in 1751 and Earl of Shelburne in 1753 (after which his elder son John was styled Viscount Fitzmaurice). His grandfather, Lord Kerry, died when he was four, but Fitzmaurice grew up with other people's grim memories of the old man as a "tyrant", whose family and servants lived in permanent fear of him.

Fitzmaurice spent his childhood "in the remotest parts of the south of Ireland," (Note: Childhood in the remotest parts of the south of Ireland probably refers to the family estates in County Kerry. The Pettys owned the Lansdowne Estates in the Kenmare area in South Kerry and the Fitzmaurice estates were in the Lixnaw area in North Kerry.) and, according to his own account, when he entered Christ Church, Oxford, in 1755, he had "both everything to learn and everything to unlearn".

From a tutor whom he describes as "narrow-minded" he received advantageous guidance in his studies, but he attributes his improvement in manners and in knowledge of the world chiefly to the fact that, as was his "fate through life", he fell in "with clever but unpopular connexions".

== Military career and election to Parliament ==
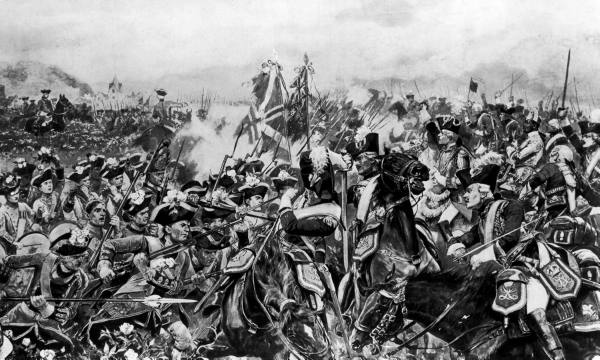
Shelburne served with distinction during the Seven Years' War participating in engagements such as the Battle of Minden in 1759.

Shortly after leaving the university, he served in 20th Foot regiment commanded by James Wolfe during the Seven Years' War. He became friends with his fellow officer Charles Grey, whose career he later assisted. In 1757 he took part in the amphibious Raid on Rochefort which withdrew without making any serious attempt on the town. The following year he was sent to serve in Germany and distinguished himself at Minden and Kloster-Kampen. For his services he was appointed aide-de-camp to the new King, George III, with the rank of colonel.

This brought protests from several members of the cabinet as it meant he was promoted ahead of much more senior officers. In response to the appointment, the Duke of Richmond resigned a post in the royal household. Though he had no active military career after this, his early promotion as colonel meant that he would be further promoted through seniority to major-general in 1765, lieutenant-general in 1772 and general in 1783.

On 2 June 1760, while still abroad, Fitzmaurice had been returned to the British House of Commons as a member for Wycombe. He was re-elected unopposed at the general election of 1761, and was also elected to the Irish House of Commons for County Kerry.

However, on 14 May 1761, before either Parliament met, he succeeded on his father's death as the second Earl of Shelburne in the Peerage of Ireland and the second Baron Wycombe in the Peerage of Great Britain. As a result, he lost his seat in both Houses of Commons and moved up to the House of Lords, though he would not take his seat in the Irish House of Lords until April 1764. He was succeeded in Wycombe by one of his supporters Colonel Isaac Barré who had a distinguished war record after serving with James Wolfe in Canada.

== Economics ==
Shelburne, who was a descendant of the father of quantitative economics, William Petty, displayed a serious interest in economic reform, and was a proselytizer for free trade. He consulted with numerous English, Scottish, French and American economists and experts. He was on good terms with Benjamin Franklin and David Hume. He met in Paris with leading French economists and intellectuals. By the 1770s Shelburne had become the most prominent British statesman to advocate free trade. Shelburne said his conversion from mercantilism to free trade ultimately derived from long conversations in 1761 with Adam Smith. In 1795 he described this to Dugald Stewart:

I owe to a journey I made with Mr Smith from Edinburgh to London, the difference between light and darkness through the best part of my life. The novelty of his principles, added to my youth and prejudices, made me unable to comprehend them at the time, but he urged them with so much benevolence, as well as eloquence, that they took a certain hold, which, though it did not develop itself so as to arrive at full conviction for some few years after, I can fairly say, has constituted, ever since, the happiness of my life, as well as any little consideration I may have enjoyed in it.

Ritcheson is dubious on whether the journey with Smith actually happened, but provides no evidence to the contrary. There is proof that Shelburne did consult with Smith on at least one occasion, and Smith was close to Shelburne's father and his brother.

== Early political career ==
Shelburne's new military role close to the King brought him into communication with Lord Bute, who was the King's closest advisor and a senior minister in the government. In 1761 Shelburne was employed by Bute to negotiate for the support of Henry Fox. Fox held the lucrative but unimportant post of Paymaster of the Forces, but commanded large support in the House of Commons and could boost Bute's power base. Shelburne was opposed to Pitt, who had resigned from the government in 1761. Under instructions from Shelburne, Barré made a vehement attack on Pitt in the House of Commons.

In 1762 negotiations for a peace agreement went on in London and Paris. Eventually, a deal was agreed but it was heavily criticised for the perceived leniency of its terms as it handed back a number of captured territories to France and Spain. Defending it in the House of Lords, Shelburne observed "the security of the British colonies in North America was the first cause of the war" asserting that security "has been wisely attended to in the negotiations for peace". Led by Fox, the government was able to push the peace treaty through parliament despite opposition led by Pitt. Shortly afterwards, Bute chose to resign as prime minister and retire from politics and was replaced by George Grenville.

Shelburne joined the Grenville ministry in 1763 as First Lord of Trade. By this stage, Shelburne had changed his opinion of Pitt and become an admirer of him. After failing to secure Pitt's inclusion in the Cabinet he resigned office after only a few months. Having moreover on account of his support of Pitt on the question of John Wilkes's expulsion from the House of Commons incurred the displeasure of the King, he retired for a time to his estate.

=== Southern Secretary ===
After Pitt's return to power in 1766, he became Southern Secretary, but during Pitt's illness his conciliatory policy towards America was completely thwarted by his colleagues and the King, and in 1768 he was dismissed from office. During the Corsican Crisis, sparked by the French invasion of Corsica, Shelburne was the major voice in the cabinet who favoured assisting the Corsican Republic. Although secret aid was given to the Corsicans it was decided not to intervene militarily and provoke a war with France, a decision made easier by the departure of the hard-line Shelburne from the cabinet.

In June 1768 the General Court incorporated the district of Shelburne, Massachusetts from the area formerly known as "Deerfield Northeast" and in 1786 the district became a town. The town was named in honour of Lord Shelburne, who, in return sent a church bell, which never reached the town.

=== Opposition ===
Shelburne went into Opposition where he continued to associate with William Pitt, 1st Earl of Chatham. They were both critical of the policies of the North government in the years leading up to the outbreak of the American War of Independence in 1775. As the war progressed, Shelburne cooperated with the Rockingham Whigs to attack the government of Lord North. After a British army was compelled to surrender at the Battle of Saratoga in 1777, Shelburne joined other leaders of the Opposition to call for a total withdrawal of British troops.

== Prime minister ==
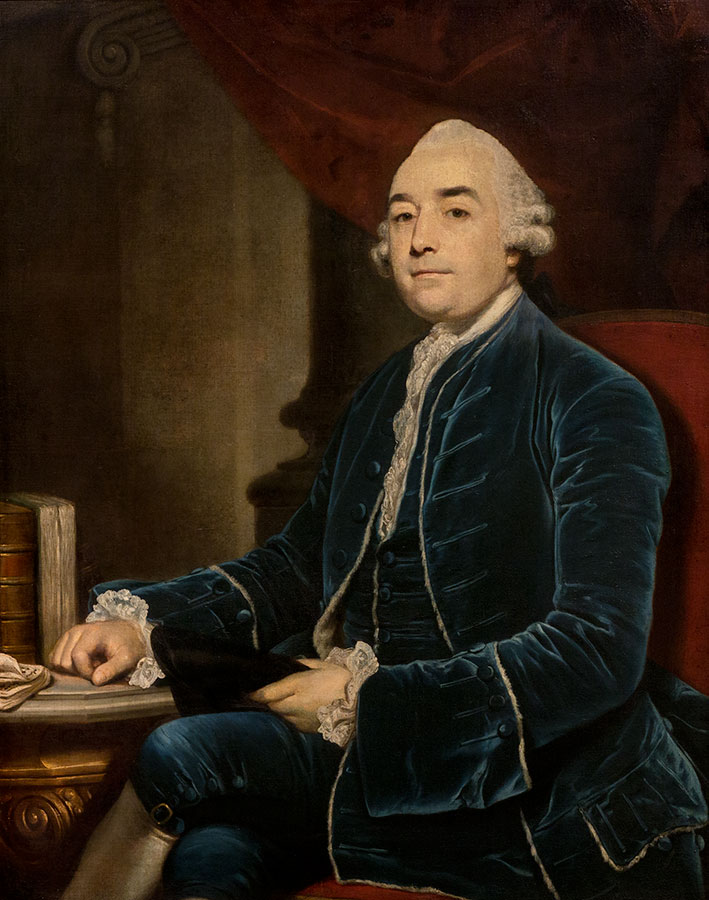
A portrait of Lord Shelburne by Sir Joshua Reynolds

In March 1782, following the downfall of the North ministry, Shelburne agreed to take office under Lord Rockingham on condition that the King would recognise the United States. Following the sudden and unexpected death of Lord Rockingham on 1 July 1782, Shelburne succeeded him as prime minister. Shelburne's appointment by the King provoked Charles James Fox and his supporters, including Edmund Burke, to resign their posts on 4 July 1782. Burke scathingly compared Shelburne to his predecessor Rockingham. One of the figures brought in as a replacement was the 23-year-old William Pitt, son of Shelburne's former political ally, who became Chancellor of the Exchequer. That year, Shelburne was appointed to the Order of the Garter as its 599th Knight.

=== Peace negotiations ===
Shelburne's government continued negotiations begun in early 1782 under Rockingham for peace in Paris, using Richard Oswald as the chief negotiator. Shelburne entertained a French peace envoy Joseph Matthias Gérard de Rayneval at his country estate in Wiltshire, and they discreetly agreed on a number of points which formed a basis for peace. Shelburne's own envoys negotiated a separate peace with American commissioners which eventually led to an agreement on American independence and the borders of the newly created United States. Shelburne agreed to generous borders in the Illinois Country, but rejected demands by Benjamin Franklin for the cession of Canada and other territories. Historians have often commented that the treaty was very generous to the United States in terms of greatly enlarged boundaries. Historians such as Alvord, Harlow and Ritcheson have emphasized that British generosity was based on Shelburne's statesmanlike vision of close economic ties between Britain and the United States. The concession of the vast trans-Appalachian areas was designed to facilitate the growth of the American population and create lucrative markets for British merchants, without any military or administrative costs to Britain. The point was the United States would become a major trading partner. As the French foreign minister Vergennes later put it, "The English buy peace rather than make it".

=== Downfall ===
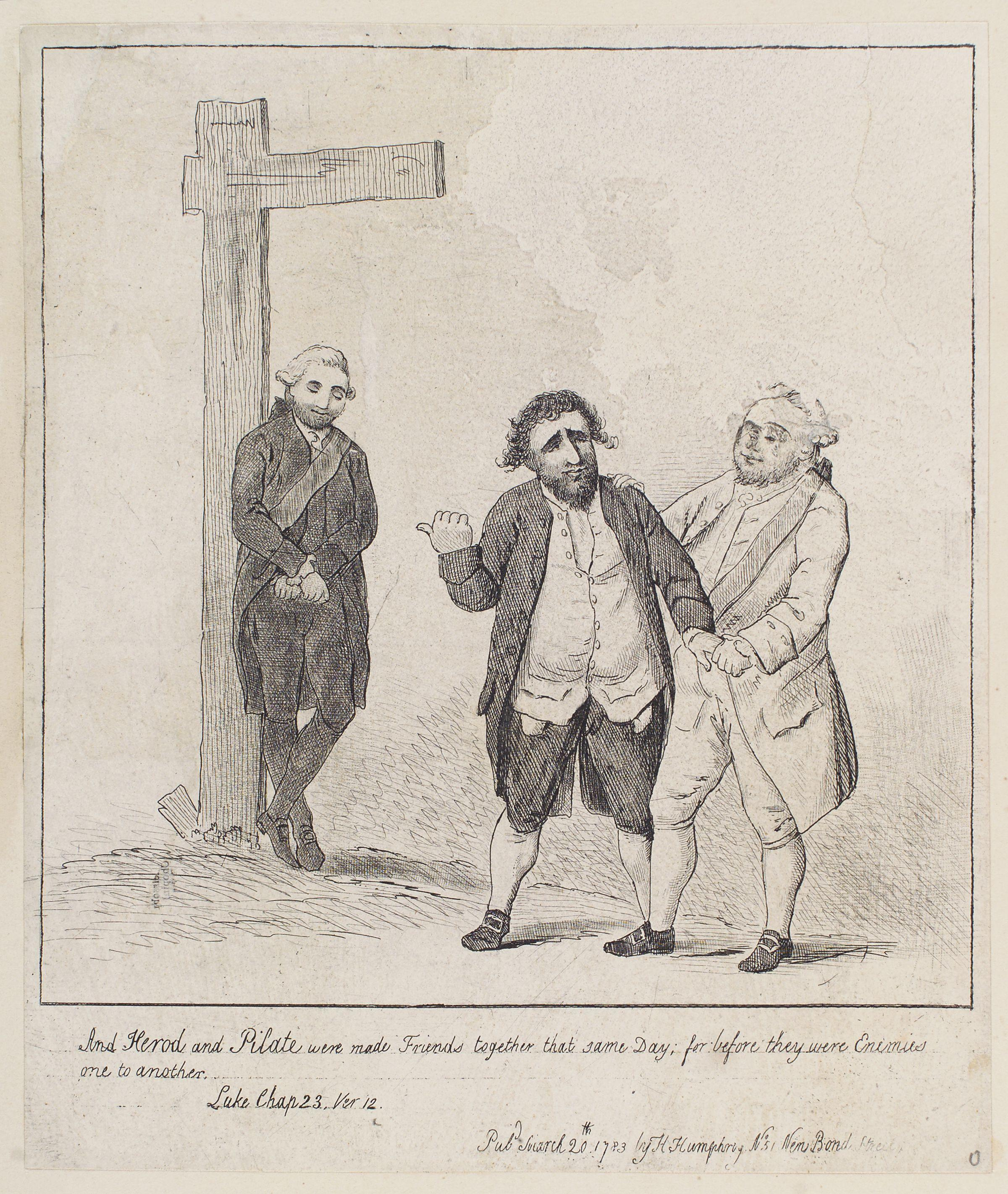
Shelburne, Charles James Fox and Frederick North, 2nd Earl of Guilford by James Gillray (1783)

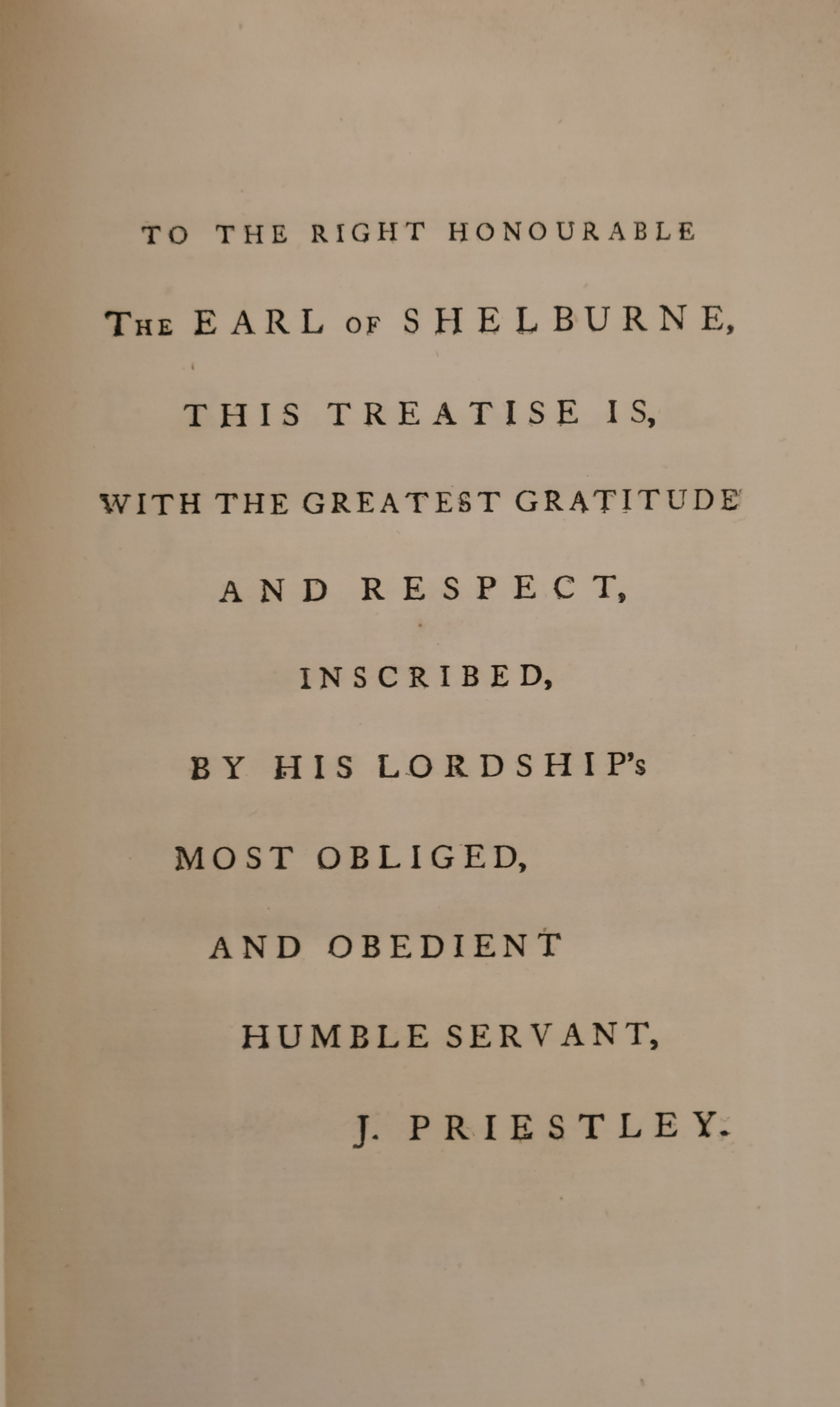
Dedication to Shelburne in volume I of Joseph Priestly's Experiments and Observations on Different Kinds of Air (1774)

Fox's resignation in 1782 led to the unexpected creation of a coalition led by Fox and Lord North, previously bitter rivals, which soon dominated the Opposition.

In April 1783 the Opposition forced Shelburne's resignation, and the new coalition government selected The Duke of Portland as prime minister until its fall in December that same year. The Treaty of Paris which formally ended the American Revolutionary War was signed during Portland's tenure, but the agreement of peace terms that formed the basis of the treaty was the major achievement of Shelburne's time in office.

Shelburn's fall was perhaps hastened by his plans for the reform of the public service. He had also in contemplation a Bill to promote free trade between Britain and the United States.

== Later life ==
When Pitt became prime minister in 1784, Shelburne, instead of receiving a place in the Cabinet, was created Marquess of Lansdowne. Though giving general support to the policy of Pitt, he from this time ceased to take an active part in public affairs. He was elected a Foreign Honorary Member of the American Academy of Arts and Sciences in 1803. A personal act, the Marquis of Lansdowne's Relief Act 1797 (37 Geo. 3. c. 22 Pr.), relieved him "from disabilities in consequence of his having sat and voted in the House of Lords without having made the necessary oaths and declarations".

Around 1762, he founded the Boodle's Club, which would later have as members Adam Smith, the Duke of Wellington, Sir Winston Churchill, and Ian Fleming, among others, and is now the second oldest club in the world.

== Marriage and issue ==
Lord Lansdowne was twice married:

First to Lady Sophia Carteret (26 August 1745 – 5 January 1771), daughter of John Carteret, 2nd Earl Granville, through whom he obtained the Lansdowne estates near Bath. Extracts from her diaries were published in Edmond Fitzmaurice, 1st Baron Fitzmaurice's biography of her husband, his grandfather by the Earl's second marriage. They had at least one child:

- John Henry Petty, 2nd Marquess of Lansdowne (6 December 1765 – 15 November 1809), sat from 1786 in his father's interest House of Commons for Chipping Wycombe. After witnessing revolutionary events in Paris, he began to establish an independent reputation as a critic of the war with France and of the suppression of democratic agitation at home. In Ireland, to which he repaired in 1797, he was suspected by the Dublin Castle administration of being a party to Robert Emmet's conspiracy to renew the United Irish rebellion of 1798 with a rising Dublin. He died, without issue, within four years of his father's death in 1809, aged 43.

Secondly, to Lady Louisa FitzPatrick (1755 – 7 August 1789), daughter of the 1st Earl of Upper Ossory. They had at least one child:

- Henry Petty-Fitzmaurice, 3rd Marquess of Lansdowne (1780–1863), who succeeded his half-brother in the title.

Lord Lansdowne's brother, The Hon. Thomas Fitzmaurice (1742–1793) of Cliveden, was also a Member of Parliament.

== Cabinet of Lord Shelburne ==
Portfolio	Minister	Took office	Left office	Party
First Lord of the Treasury	William Petty, 2nd Earl of Shelburne (head of ministry)	4 July 1782	26 March 1783	Whig
Lord Chancellor	Edward Thurlow, 1st Baron Thurlow	3 June 1778	7 April 1783	Independent
Lord President of the Council	Charles Pratt, 1st Baron Camden	27 March 1782	2 April 1783	Whig
Lord Privy Seal	Augustus FitzRoy, 3rd Duke of Grafton	1782	1783	Whig
Chancellor of the Exchequer	William Pitt the Younger	10 July 1782	31 March 1783	Whig
Secretary of State for the Home Department	Thomas Townshend	10 July 1782	2 April 1783	Whig
Secretary of State for Foreign Affairs; First Lord of Trade	Thomas Robinson, 2nd Baron Grantham	13 July 1782 / 9 December 1780	2 April 1783	Whig
First Lord of the Admiralty	Augustus Keppel, 1st Viscount Keppel	1782	1783	Whig
First Lord of the Admiralty	Richard Howe, 4th Viscount Howe	1783	1788	Independent
Chancellor of the Duchy of Lancaster	John Dunning, 1st Baron Ashburton	17 April 1782	29 August 1783	Independent
Master-General of the Ordnance	Charles Lennox, 3rd Duke of Richmond	1782	1783	Whig

== Ancestry ==
Ancestors of William Petty, 2nd Earl of Shelburne

8. William FitzMaurice, 20th Baron Kerry (=12)
4. Thomas FitzMaurice, 1st Earl of Kerry
9. Constance Long (=13)
2. John Petty, 1st Earl of Shelburne
10. Sir William Petty
5. Anne Petty
11. Elizabeth Waller
1. William Petty, 2nd Earl of Shelburne
12. William FitzMaurice, 20th Baron Kerry (=8)
6. Lt. Col. Hon. William FitzMaurice
13. Constance Long (=9)
3. Mary FitzMaurice
14. Sir John Brookes, 1st Baronet
7. Deborah Brookes
15. Mary Waller

== Arms ==
Coat of arms of William Petty, 2nd Earl of Shelburne
Coronet A Coronet of a Marquess Crest 1st, a beehive beset with bees, diversely volant, proper; 2nd, a centaur drawing a bow and arrow, proper, the part from the waist argent. Escutcheon Quarterly : 1st and 4th Ermine, on a bend, azure a magnetic needle pointing at a polar star, or, (Petty); 2nd and 3rd Argent, a saltier, gules, a chief, ermine (Fitzmaurice). Supporters Two pegasi, ermine.; bridled, crined, winged, and unguled, or, each charged on the shoulder with a fienr-de-lis, azure. Motto Virtute non verbis (By courage, not words). Orders The Most Noble Order of the Garter - Knight Companion (KG).

== Collections ==
University College London holds over 4000 tracts in its Lansdowne and Halifax tracts collections, the former being named after Petty. The tracts were published in England between 1559 and 1776, and relate to the union between England and Scotland, the Civil War and the Restoration. Many of the tracts were written by Daniel Defoe and Jonathan Swift under pseudonyms.

== See also ==
- Lansdowne Portrait
- Lansdowne Heracles

== Literature ==
- Cannon, John. "Petty, William, second earl of Shelburne and first marquess of Lansdowne (1737–1805)", Oxford Dictionary of National Biography, (Oxford University Press, 2004); online edn, Sept 2013 accessed 16 Nov 2014 doi:10.1093/ref:odnb/22070
- Fitzmaurice, Edmond. Life of William, Earl of Shelburne. Macmillan & Co. (2nd ed., 1912 [1st ed. 1875], reprinted 2006). OCLC 3220064 (complete list of all editions).
- Fleming, Thomas. The Perils of Peace: America's Struggle for Survival After Yorktown. First Smithsonian books, 2008.
- Middleton, Charles. The Bells of Victory: The Pitt-North Ministry and the Conduct of the Seven Years' War, 1757–1762. Cambridge University Press, 1985.
- Nelson, Paul David. Sir Charles Grey, First Earl Grey: Royal Soldier, Family Patriarch. Associated University Presses, 1996.
- Norris, John (1963). Shelburne and Reform. London: Macmillan. Archived from the original on 4 March 2016 – via Questia.
- Ritcheson, Charles R. "The Earl of Shelbourne and Peace with America, 1782–1783: Vision and Reality." International History Review (1983) 5#3 pp: 322–345. online
- Schweizer, Karl W. (ed.) Lord Bute: Essays in Reinterpritation. Leicester University Press, 1998.
- Simpson, W. O. "Lord Shelburne and North America." History Today (Jan 1960) 19#1 pp 52–62.

Parliament of Great Britain
Preceded by The Earl of Shelburne; Edmund Waller	Member of Parliament for Wycombe; 1760 – 1761; With: Edmund Waller 1760–1761; Robert Waller 1761	Succeeded by Robert Waller; Isaac Barré
Parliament of Ireland
Preceded by John Blennerhassett; Lancelot Crosbie	Member of Parliament for County Kerry; 1761–1762; With: John Blennerhassett	Succeeded by John Blennerhassett; John Blennerhassett
Political offices
Preceded by Charles Townshend	First Lord of Trade; 1763	Succeeded by The Earl of Hillsborough
Preceded by The Duke of Richmond	Secretary of State for the Southern Department; 1766–1768	Succeeded by The Viscount Weymouth
Preceded by The Earl of Hillsborough as Secretary of State for the Southern Department	Home Secretary; 1782	Succeeded by Thomas Townshend
Preceded by The Viscount Stormont	Leader of the House of Lords; 1782–1783	Succeeded by The Duke of Portland
Preceded by The Marquess of Rockingham	Prime Minister of Great Britain; 4 July 1782 – 26 March 1783	Succeeded by The Duke of Portland
Peerage of Great Britain
New creation	Marquess of Lansdowne; 1784–1805	Succeeded by John Petty
Preceded by John Petty	Baron Wycombe; 1761–1805	Succeeded by John Petty
Peerage of Ireland
Preceded by John Petty	Earl of Shelburne; 1761–1805	Succeeded by John Petty
