= County Kerry (Parliament of Ireland constituency) =

Pre-1801 Irish constituency

- Former county constituency for the Irish House of Commons
- County: County Kerry

–1801
- Seats: 2
- Replaced by: County Kerry

County Kerry was a constituency represented in the Irish House of Commons until its abolition on 1 January 1801. Following the Acts of Union 1800 the county retained two seats.

== Boundaries and boundary changes ==
This constituency was based in County Kerry.

== History ==
In the Patriot Parliament of 1689 summoned by James II, Kerry was represented by two members.

== Members of Parliament ==
- 1376: Gilbert Fitz Walter and Thomas Fitz Daniell of Rathlaici were elected to come to England to consult with the king and council about the government of Ireland and about an aid for the king.
- 1585–1586: John Fitzgerald and Thomas Spring
- 1613–1615: Daniel O'Sullivan Beare and Stephen Rice of Ballyruddell
- 1634–1635: John FitzGerald and Walter Crosbie and Sir Valentine Browne
- 1639–1649: Sir Valentine Browne (died 1640 and replaced by Maurice Fitzgerald) and Sir Edward Denny
- 1654: Sir Hardress Waller; Henry Ingoldsby (First Protectorate Parliament, Westminster)
- 1656: Sir Hardress Waller; Henry Ingoldsby (Second Protectorate Parliament, Westminster)
- 1659: Sir Hardress Waller; Henry Ingoldsby (Third Protectorate Parliament, Westminster)
- 1661–1666: Captain John Blennerhassett, snr and Arthur Denny

=== 1689–1801 ===
Election	First MP	Second MP
1689	Nicholas Brown	Sir Thomas Crosbie
1692	Edward Denny	Hon. Thomas FitzMaurice
1697	Edward Denny	William Sandes
1703	Edward Denny	John Blennerhassett
1709	Edward Denny	John Blennerhassett
1713	Edward Denny	Sir Maurice Crosbie
1715	John Blennerhassett	Sir Maurice Crosbie
1727	Arthur Denny	Sir Maurice Crosbie
1743	Hon. John FitzMaurice	Sir Maurice Crosbie
1751	John Blennerhassett	Sir Maurice Crosbie
1759	John Blennerhassett	Lancelot Crosbie
1761	Viscount FitzMaurice	John Blennerhassett
1762	John Blennerhassett	John Blennerhassett
1763	Thomas Fitzmaurice	John Blennerhassett
1768	Barry Denny	John Blennerhassett
1775	Barry Denny	Arthur Blennerhassett
1776	Rowland Bateman	Arthur Blennerhassett
1783	Sir Barry Denny, 1st Bt	Richard Townsend Herbert
1790	Sir Barry Denny, 1st Bt	John Blennerhassett
May 1794	Sir Barry Denny, 1st Bt	John Gustavus Crosbie
July 1794	Sir Barry Denny, 2nd Bt	John Gustavus Crosbie
1795	Maurice FitzGerald	John Gustavus Crosbie
1798	Maurice FitzGerald	James Crosbie
1801	Succeeded by the Westminster constituency County Kerry	

== Bibliography ==
- O'Hart, John (2007). The Irish and Anglo-Irish Landed Gentry: When Cromwell came to Ireland. Vol. II. Heritage Books. ISBN 978-0-7884-1927-0.
- Johnston-Liik, E. M. (2002). History of the Irish Parliament, 1692–1800, Publisher: Ulster Historical Foundation (28 Feb 2002), ISBN 1-903688-09-4, and online History of the Irish Parliament Online – Ulster Historical Foundation
- T. W. Moody, F. X. Martin, F. J. Byrne, A New History of Ireland 1534–1691, Oxford University Press, 1978
- Leigh Rayment's historical List of Members of the Irish House of Commons. Cites: Johnston-Liik, Edith Mary (2002). The History of the Irish Parliament 1692-1800 (6 volumes). Ulster Historical Foundation.
- Clarke, Maude V. (1932–34). "William of Windsor in Ireland, 1369-1376". Proceedings of the Royal Irish Academy: Archaeology, Culture, History, Literature. 41: 55–130. JSTOR 25515963.
