= Edward Denny (1652–1712) =

Anglo-Irish politician (1652–1712)

Colonel Edward Denny (10 February 1652 – 1712) was an Anglo-Irish politician.

== Biography ==
Denny was born at Tralee Castle, the son of Sir Arthur Denny and Ellen Barry. In 1674 he married Mary Boyle Maynard, with whom he had sixteen children. He rebuilt the family seat at Tralee Castle in 1691 after it had been destroyed during the Williamite War in Ireland. He was the Member of Parliament for County Kerry in the Irish House of Commons between 1692 and 1699.

Parliament of Ireland
Preceded by Nicholas Brown; Sir Thomas Crosbie	Member of Parliament for County Kerry; 1692–1699; With: Hon. Thomas FitzMaurice; William Sandes (1697–1699)	Succeeded by Edward Denny; John Blennerhassett
