= Sir Edward Denny, 3rd Baronet =

Anglo-Irish politician (??–1831)

Sir Edward Denny, 3rd Baronet (died 1 August 1831) was an Anglo-Irish politician. His family effectively owned the town of Tralee and had great political influence in County Kerry.

== Biography ==
Denny was the son of Sir Barry Denny, 1st Baronet and his wife and cousin Jane Denny, and the younger brother of Sir Barry Denny, 2nd Baronet. He was educated at Trinity College, Dublin.

He held the office of High Sheriff of Kerry in 1794 and was Deputy Lieutenant of County Kerry. On 20 October 1794 he succeeded to his brother's baronetcy, after Sir Barry was killed in a duel with John Gustavus Crosbie. This incident led to a bitter feud between the two families, and the sudden death of Crosbie, after falling from his horse in 1797, led to a local tradition that Edward had arranged for his murder as an act of vengeance. He was elected to the House of Commons of the United Kingdom as a Tory Member of Parliament for Tralee in September 1828, but resigned after less than a year in June 1829 due to poor health. He died two years later.

He married Elizabeth Day, daughter of Hon. Robert Day, judge of the Court of King's Bench (Ireland) and his family's former legal adviser, and his first wife Mary (Polly) Potts, on 26 May 1795, and together they had six children, including Edward, Robert, Diana and Anthony, Archdeacon of Ardfert. He was succeeded by his eldest son, Edward, then on Edward's death without issue to Robert's son.

== Arms ==
Coat of arms of Sir Edward Denny, 3rd Baronet
| Notes Confirmed by William Hawkins, Ulster King of Arms, 10 January 1782. Crest A cubit arm vested Azure turned up Argent holding in the hand Proper five ears of wheat Or. Escutcheon Gules a saltire Argent between twelve cross crosslets Or. Motto Et mea Messis Erit |

Parliament of the United Kingdom
| Preceded by James Cuffe | Member of Parliament for Tralee; 1828–1829 | Succeeded by Robert Vernon |
Baronetage of Ireland
| Preceded by Barry Denny | Baronet (of Castle Moyle); 1794–1831 | Succeeded by Edward Denny |
