= Isaac Barré =

British Army officer and politician (1726–1802)

Lieutenant-Colonel The Right Honourable Isaac Barré
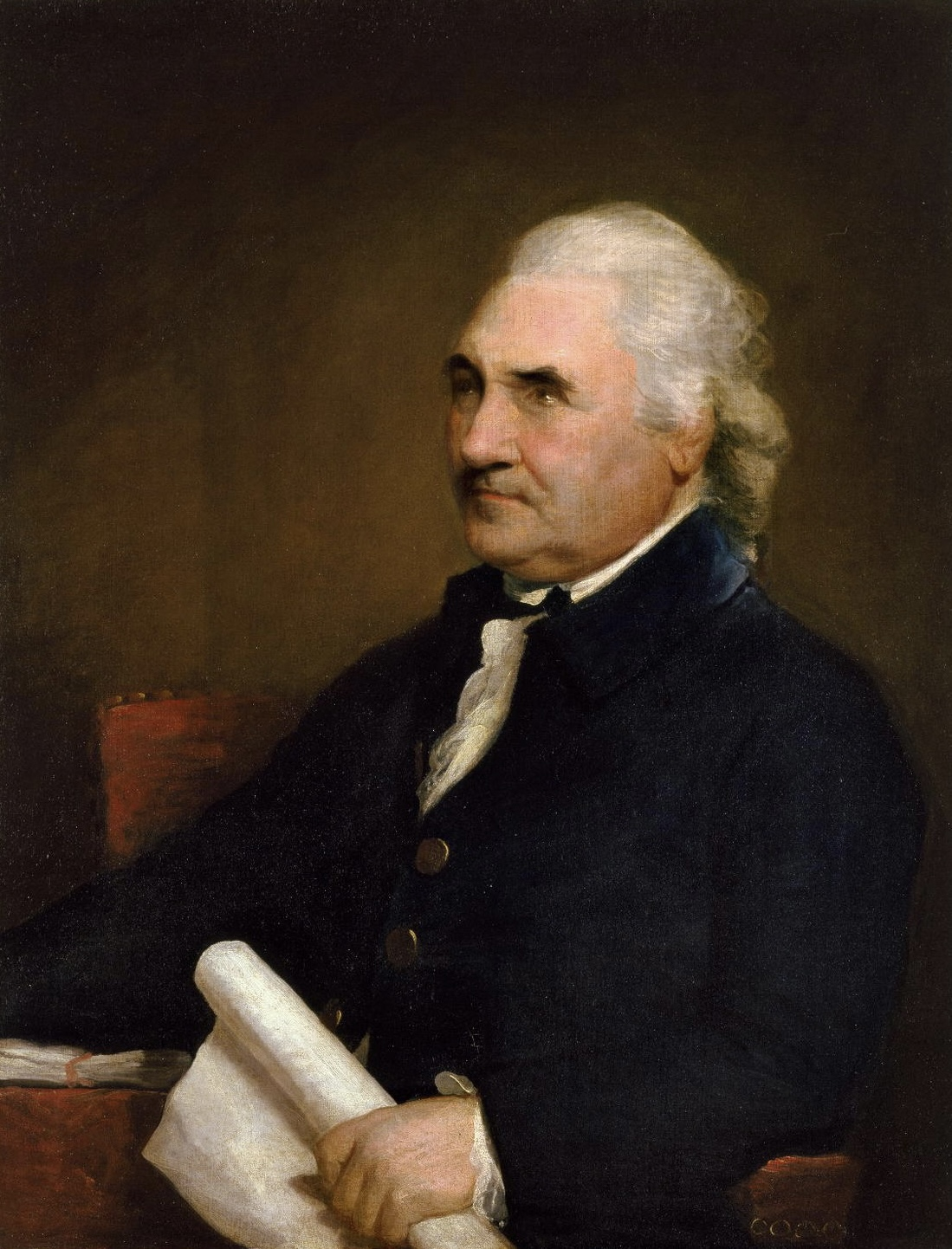
- Portrait of Isaac Barré by Gilbert Stuart, c. 1785

Member of the British Parliament for Calne (UK Parliament constituency)
- In office 1774–1790 Serving with John Dunning (1774), James Townsend (1782), Joseph Jekyll (1787)
- Preceded by: Thomas Fitzmaurice
- Succeeded by: John Moris

Member of Parliament for Chipping Wycombe (UK Parliament constituency)
- In office 1761–1774 Serving with Robert Waller
- Preceded by: Viscount FitzMaurice; Robert Waller
- Succeeded by: Thomas Fitzmaurice; Robert Waller

Clerk of the Pells
- In office 1784–1802
- Monarch: George III
- Prime Minister: William Pitt the Younger; Henry Addington
- Preceded by: Edward Walpole
- Succeeded by: Henry Addington Jr.

Paymaster of the Forces
- In office 1782–1783
- Monarch: George III
- Prime Minister: The Earl of Shelburne
- Preceded by: Edmund Burke
- Succeeded by: Edmund Burke

Treasurer of the Navy
- In office 1782
- Monarch: George III
- Prime Minister: Lord Rockingham
- Preceded by: Welbore Ellis
- Succeeded by: Henry Dundas

Personal details
- Born: 15 October 1726 Dublin, Ireland
- Died: 20 July 1802 (aged 75) Mayfair, London, England
- Resting place: St. Mary Churchyard, East Raynham, England
- Party: Whigs
- Education: Trinity College Dublin

Military service
- Allegiance: Great Britain
- Branch/service: British Army
- Years of service: 1746–1763; 1766–1773
- Rank: Lieutenant colonel
- Unit: 32nd Regiment of Foot; 106th Regiment of Foot
- Commands: Governor of Stirling Castle
- Battles/wars: War of the Austrian Succession; French and Indian War

Lieutenant-Colonel Isaac Barré (15 October 1726 – 20 July 1802) was a British Army officer and politician. Barré served with distinction serving in the Seven Years' War and later became a member of parliament, where he was a vocal supporter of William Pitt, 1st Earl of Chatham. He is known for coining the term "Sons of Liberty" in reference to the Patriots of the Thirteen Colonies.

== Early life ==
Barré was born in Dublin on 15 October 1726, the son of Marie Madelaine (Raboteau) Barré and Peter Barré, Huguenot refugees who escaped to Ireland. Peter Barré became a linen dealer and served as High Sheriff of Dublin City. Isaac Barré was educated at Trinity College, and graduated with a Bachelor of Arts degree in 1745. His parents hoped he would study law, and David Garrick thought he had potential as an actor and offered to hire and train him, but Barré decided on a military career and entered the British Army in 1746.

== Military career ==
Barré joined the 32nd Regiment of Foot as an ensign in 1746. The regiment was based in Flanders during the War of the Austrian Succession, and Barré gained his initial army experience prior to the end of the conflict in 1748. He continued to serve, and was promoted to lieutenant in 1755, and captain in 1756. During the French and Indian War, he served under his patron General James Wolfe on the Rochefort expedition of 1757, when he first met Lord Shelburne, and afterwards in Canada where he was appointed adjutant-general, fighting at both Louisbourg (1758) and Quebec (1759). In 1759, he was promoted to major, but the rank applied only during his service in America. In the Quebec expedition, in which Wolfe was killed, Barré was severely wounded by a bullet in the cheek and lost the use of his right eye. He was among the group gathered around the dying Wolfe, which was immortalised in Benjamin West's celebrated picture.

Returning to England in September 1760, despite his years of service, Barré was denied promotion by Pitt and turned to Shelburne for help. After undertaking a tour of Shelburne's Irish estates, he became the lieutenant colonel of the 106th Foot, and in 1763, he was appointed to the lucrative posts of adjutant general of the British Army and Governor of Stirling Castle.

== Political career ==
Shelburne introduced Barré to Lord Bute and brought him into parliament for his borough of Chipping Wycombe (1761–1774), having selected him as a "bravo" to take on Pitt. In 1774, Barré's constituency switched to Calne, and he served until 1790. One of the few self-made soldiers in parliament, Barré became one of Shelburne's principal supporters in the House of Commons. In his first political speech, he vehemently attacked the absent war minister William Pitt, renewing this assault the next day to Pitt's face. This caused a sensation, and set the tone of a long and colourful parliamentary career in which he acquired a fearsome reputation as an orator. However, he ultimately became a devoted Pitt adherent.

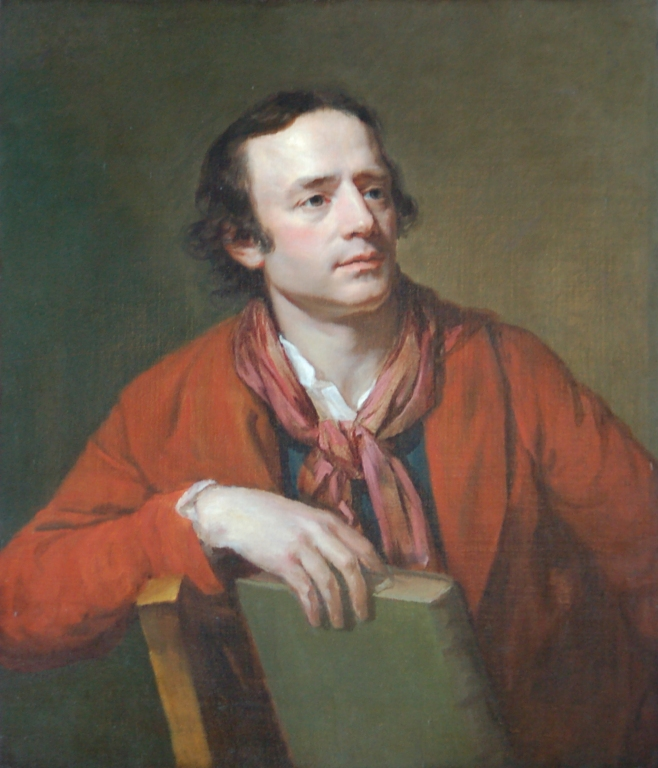
Portrait by Hugh Douglas Hamilton, c. 1765

From 1766 to 1768, Barré was a Vice-Treasurer of Ireland. His 1782 appointment as Treasurer of the Navy, which carried a pension of £3,200 a year at a time when the government was ostensibly advocating stringency, caused great discontent. William Pitt the Younger replied that the pension was compensation for Barré's dismissal from his military offices in 1763; he then appointed Barré to the even more lucrative position of Paymaster General of the forces, with responsibility for England's entire army payroll, which he held from August 1782 to April 1783. In 1784, Barré relinquished his pension in exchange for appointment to the sinecure of Clerk of the Pells. Nominally responsible for maintaining records of all Exchequer income and payments, the Clerk of the Pells was paid on a percentage system, which enabled Barré to accumulate a sizable fortune.

Barré's knowledge of North America (he was one of the few politicians with friendships among the American mercantile classes) made him a champion of the colonists. He opposed taxation of America. Barré called the colonists "Sons of Liberty" in response to Charles Townshend's observation when introducing the Stamp Act resolutions that the colonies should "contribute to the mother country which had planted, nurtured and indulged them":

They planted by your care? No! Your oppression planted 'em in America. They fled from your tyranny to a then uncultivated and unhospitable country where they exposed themselves to almost all the hardships to which human nature is liable, and among others to the cruelties of a savage foe, the most subtle, and I take upon me to say, the most formidable of any people upon the face of God’s earth....

They nourished by your indulgence? They grew by your neglect of 'em. As soon as you began to care about 'em, that care was exercised in sending persons to rule over 'em, in one department and another, who were perhaps the deputies of deputies to some member of this house, sent to spy out their liberty, to misrepresent their actions and to prey upon 'em; men whose behaviour on many occasions has caused the blood of those sons of liberty to recoil within them....

They protected by your arms? They have nobly taken up arms in your defence, have exerted a valour amidst their constant and laborious industry for the defence of a country whose frontier while drenched in blood, its interior parts have yielded all its little savings to your emolument .... The people I believe are as truly loyal as any subjects the king has, but a people jealous of their liberties and who will vindicate them if ever they should be violated; but the subject is too delicate and I will say no more."

In the Stamp Act crisis, Barré not only championed repeal but also followed Pitt in opposing the complete right of taxation as stated in the Declaratory Act.

Horace Walpole described Barré as "a black [meaning his hair was black], robust man, of a military figure, rather hard-favoured than not, young, with a peculiar distortion on one side of his face, which it seems was a bullet lodged loosely in his cheek, and which gave a savage glare to one eye".

Barré became blind in 1783 and missed several sessions of Parliament. He later resumed his seat, but was not as effective as he had been previously. He retired in 1790.

== Death and burial ==
Barré died at his home on Stanhope Street in the Mayfair district of London on 20 July 1802. He was buried at St. Mary Churchyard in East Raynham.

Barré's residuary legatee was Anne Townshend, Marchioness Townshend, whom he had known before her marriage to George Townshend, 1st Marquess Townshend. She received approximately £24,000 (equivalent to about £2.3 million in 2018, or $3.2 million).

== Legacy ==
The city of Wilkes-Barre, Pennsylvania, is named for him, as is the town of Barre, Massachusetts. There are also a town and a city named for Barré in Vermont (Barre City and Barre Town), as well as the towns of Barre, New York, and Barre, Wisconsin. There is a memorial to Barré in New York City, and numerous eastern US cities have named streets for him.

== Bibliography ==
- Middlekauff, Robert (2007). The Glorious Cause: The American Revolution, 1763–1789. Oxford University Press. ISBN 978-0195315882.

Political offices
Preceded by Welbore Ellis	Treasurer of the Navy; 1782	Succeeded by Henry Dundas
Preceded by Edmund Burke	Paymaster of the Forces; 1782–1783	Succeeded by Edmund Burke
Honorary titles
Preceded by Sir Edward Walpole	Clerk of the Pells; 1784–1802	Succeeded by Henry Addington
Parliament of Great Britain
Preceded by Viscount FitzMaurice; Robert Waller	Member of Parliament for Wycombe; 1761–1774; With: Robert Waller	Succeeded by Robert Waller; Hon. Thomas FitzMaurice
Preceded by Hon. Thomas FitzMaurice; John Dunning	Member of Parliament for Calne; 1774–1790; With: John Dunning 1774–1782; James Townsend 1782–1787; Joseph Jekyll 1787–1790	Succeeded by Joseph Jekyll; John Morris
