= Edward Herbert (Irish politician) =

Irish politician

Edward Herbert (1727 – 2 March 1770) was an Irish politician.

He represented Inistioge as a Member of Parliament in the Irish House of Commons between 1749 and 1760. Herbert then sat for Tralee from 1761 until his death 1770. He married in 1759 to Nichola-Sophia.

Parliament of Ireland
Preceded by Edward Deane; Edward Deane	Member of Parliament for Inistioge; 1749–1760; With: Edward Deane (1749–1751); Joseph Deane (1751–1760)	Succeeded by Joseph Deane; John Hobson
Preceded by John Blennerhassett; Arthur Blennerhassett	Member of Parliament for Tralee; 1761–1770; With: Rowland Bateman (1761–1768); Edward Denny (1768–1770)	Succeeded by Edward Denny; Richard Underwood
