= Derryquin Castle =

Former castellated country house in County Kerry, Ireland

Coordinates: 51.822°N 9.873°W

Derryquin Castle was an 18th-century stone-built country house, now demolished, in the Parknasilla estate in Sneem, County Kerry in Ireland. It stood on the Ring of Kerry route some 40 km (25 miles) south-west of Killarney.

== Structure ==
Designed by local architect James Franklin Fuller, the house comprised a three-storey main block with a four-storey octagonal tower rising through the centre and a two-storey, partly curved, wing. The building was equipped with battlements and machicolations.

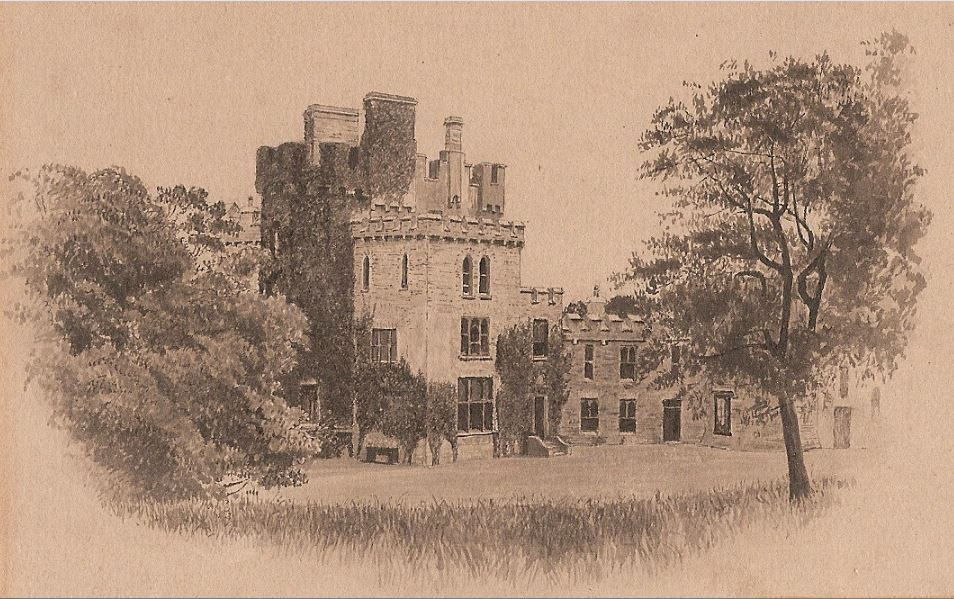
The artist's mother, Letitia Bland, was born in Derryquin Castle. Letitia married Henry Stokes, county surveyor of Kerry, and the Stokes family lived at Askive, close to Derryquin. William Stokes, a Civil Engineer like his father, emigrated to Chicago in 1872 but died soon after. This sketch has been kept in the family; it is now owned by his great-great niece, Charlotte Verity, who is married to Christopher Le Brun, President of the Royal Academy.

== History ==
The Parknasilla estate was acquired by the Very Reverend James Bland, an Englishman who had moved to Ireland in 1692 as chaplain to Henry Sydney, 1st Earl of Romney, the newly appointed Lord Lieutenant of Ireland. Bland, the son of John Bland of Sedbergh, entered St John's College, Cambridge in 1684 (BA 1687, MA 1703) and became Archdeacon of Limerick on 1 June 1693, resigned in 1705, and became Archdeacon of Aghadoe on 12 July that year. He became Treasurer of Ardfert in 1711 and Dean of Ardfert in 1728. Bland sold his Yorkshire properties in 1717. He was married to the eldest daughter of Sir Francis Brewster, Alderman of Dublin. On his death, and burial at Killarney, the property passed to his son, Judge Nathaniel Bland (1695-1760), who left it in turn for his son the Rev James Bland (1727-1786), who left it in turn for his son Francis Christopher Bland (1770–1838), High Sheriff of Kerry for 1806. From him it passed to his son James Franklin Bland (1799–1863), who was High Sheriff of Kerry for 1835. He was succeeded by Francis Christopher Bland (1826–1894), High Sheriff in 1859, and he in turn by James Franklin Bland (1850–1927). Sir (Francis) Christopher Bland has Derryquin as one of the backgrounds for his novel "Ashes in the Wind".

In 1891 James Franklin Bland sold the castle to the Warden family, who lived there until 1922, when it was burnt down by the Irish Republican Army, one of many historic houses in Ireland to suffer the same fate. It was owned at the time by Colonel Charles Wallace Warden.

The building was demolished in 1969. The site of the building now lies within the resort grounds of the Parknasilla Hotel, which the Bland family also built in the 1890s.
