= 106th Regiment of Foot (Black Musqueteers) =

Infantry regiment of the British Army

The 106th Regiment of Foot (Black Musqueteers) was an infantry regiment of the British Army that existed from 1761 to 1763. While the regiment operated during the Seven Years' War, it was deployed only in the British Isles, specifically in the southwest of England.

== History ==
On 29 January 1761 Isaac Barré received a commission as lieutenant-colonel following his return from deployment in Quebec, and on 17 October of the same year he was given a letter of service to raise a regiment of foot. Raised in Ireland, the regiment was duly numbered as the 106th, and it was formed by the regimentation of independent companies. They moved to England in the following year, where they saw service quelling disturbances and preventing raids by tinners in the stannary districts of Devon. The regiment was at its highest strength of over 600 men in November 1762, but never reached its establishment strength of 1034.

As the Seven Years' War drew to a close, the overall size of the British army was reduced. As a result of this reduction in force, the 106th Regiment was disbanded on 24 April 1763. Barré, who had since been elected Member of Parliament for Chepping Wycombe, was compensated by being appointed Adjutant General on 8 March 1763.
