= John Gustavus Crosbie =

Anglo-Irish politician

John Gustavus Crosbie (circa 1749 – 6 July 1797) was an Anglo-Irish politician, mainly remembered for killing another Member of Parliament, Sir Barry Denny, in a duel in 1794.

== Biography ==
He lived at Tubrid House, Ardfert, County Kerry. He was the only son of Lancelot Crosbie (1723–1780), who like his son was MP for Kerry, and his second wife Mary Blennerhasset, daughter of Colonel John Blennerhasset and Jane Denny. John Gustavus married his distant cousin Catherine Blennerhasset, daughter of William Blennerhassett and Catherine Johnson, in 1796; they had no children. After his death she remarried George Rowan.

Crosbie was a Colonel in the 22nd Foot. He was High Sheriff of Kerry in 1770. He served in the Irish House of Commons as the Member of Parliament for County Kerry between 1794 and his death in 1797.

In October 1794 he caused a notable scandal by killing the sitting MP for the Kerry constituency, Sir Barry Denny, 2nd Baronet, in a duel. Crosbie had taken exception to certain remarks made by Denny during the recent by-election, which he regarded as a breach of Denny's avowed position of neutrality between the various candidates, and issued a challenge. At the duel, he took careful aim and shot Sir Barry through the head. As was the accepted practice at the time among members of the aristocracy, the killing was treated as an affair of honour, despite it being premeditated murder in law, and no action was taken against him.

His sudden death three years later, after falling from his horse, was considered to be suspicious, and there is a local tradition that the Denny family poisoned him, in revenge for his killing of Sir Barry. Whether the rumour was true or false, the killing undoubtedly led to a bitter feud between the two families, which lasted for generations.

Parliament of Ireland
Preceded by Sir Barry Denny, Bt; John Blennerhassett	Member of Parliament for County Kerry; 1794–1797; With: Sir Barry Denny, Bt (1794–1794); Sir Barry Denny, Bt (1794); Maurice FitzGerald (1794–1797)	Succeeded by Maurice FitzGerald; James Crosbie
