= Maurice Hussey =

Colonel Maurice Hussey (1644–1714) was an Irish Jacobite politician and soldier.

Hussey was the son of Walter Hussey and Katherine Fitzgerald. He was a Member of Parliament for Tralee in the short-lived Patriot Parliament called by James II of England in 1689. He was given a commission in Roger McElligott's Regiment of Foot, becoming lieutenant colonel of the regiment in 1690.

Following the Williamite War in Ireland, Hussey was granted a pardon under the Articles of Limerick. However, as a staunch Roman Catholic, he left Ireland in 1703 owing to the Penal Laws.

Parliament of Ireland
Preceded by Robert Blennerhassett	Member of Parliament for Tralee; 1689; With: James Hackett	Succeeded by John Blennerhassett; James Waller
