= Tralee Castle =

Ruined castle in Tralee, County Kerry, Ireland

Coordinates: 52°16′05″N 9°42′14″W

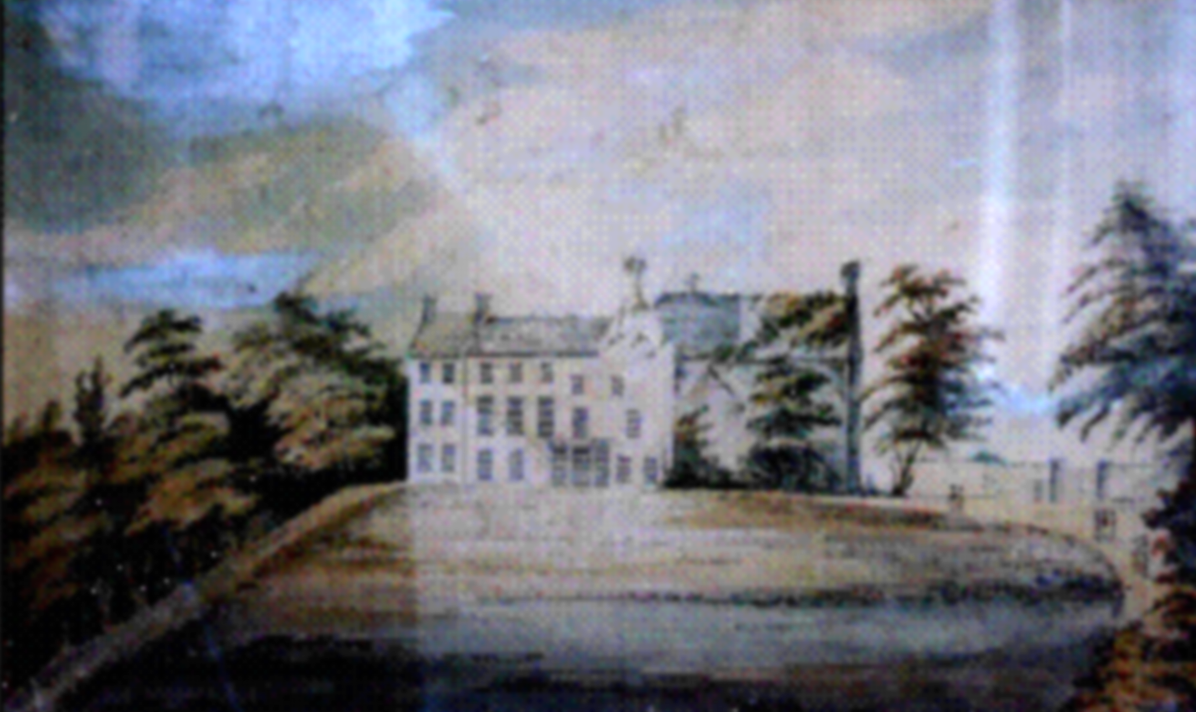
Painting from 1824 by Sarah Harnett showing the structure two years before demolition. The castle had been destroyed in 1691 for a fourth time and rebuilt as a manor house.

Tralee Castle was a medieval strategic castle in Tralee, Kerry, owned by the Denny family from 1586. It is now a ruin.

== History ==
The castle was built by the Desmond family, likely in the mid-thirteenth century at a similar time to the constriction of the nearby Castle Maine. It became a seat of the Earls of Desmond and was damaged in 1580 during the Second Desmond Rebellion. In 1586 the castle and town were granted to Sir Edward Denny, and restored by his son, Sir Edward Denny, in 1627. The castle was besieged between February and August 1642 during the Irish Rebellion of 1641 and burnt by the Irish rebels after it was surrendered by Sir Thomas Harris. The Irish Catholic rebels included Donnel Moriarty of Castledrum, Dermot Moriarty of Ballintermon, Annascaul and their brother in law Piaras Ferriter the Gaelic poet and soldier. A kinsman of the Moriartys, Teigue Moriarty, had been held prisoner in Tralee Castle.

In 1653 the castle was restored by Sir Arthur Denny. In 1691 the castle was again damaged in the Williamite War in Ireland and then rebuilt as a manor house by Colonel Edward Denny. In 1804, Sir Edward Denny, 3rd Baronet undertook work to modernise the manor, but these were unsuccessful and he directed the demolition of the remaining structure in 1826.
