= Arthur Denny (politician, born 1704) =

Arthur Denny (29 April 1704 – 8 August 1742) was an Irish politician.

He was educated at Trinity College Dublin.

Denny was a Member of Parliament for County Kerry in the Irish House of Commons from 1727 until his death in 1742.

Parliament of Ireland
Preceded by John Blennerhassett; Maurice Crosbie	Member of Parliament for County Kerry; 1727–1742; With: Maurice Crosbie	Succeeded by Hon. John FitzMaurice; Maurice Crosbie
