= John Blennerhassett (1769–1794) =

Anglo-Irish politician

John Blennerhassett (1769 – 6 July 1794) was an Anglo-Irish politician.

Blennerhassett was the son of William Blennerhassett and Catherine Johnson, and the great-grandson of John Blennerhassett. He was educated at Trinity College Dublin, graduating with a master's in 1792. Between 1790 and his death in 1794 Blennerhassett sat in the Irish House of Commons as the Member of Parliament for County Kerry. He was unmarried when he died.

Parliament of Ireland
Preceded by Sir Barry Denny, Bt. Richard Townsend Herbert	Member of Parliament for County Kerry; 1790–1794; With: Sir Barry Denny, Bt.	Succeeded by Sir Barry Denny, Bt. John Gustavus Crosbie
