= Arthur Denny (politician, born 1629) =

Anglo-Irish politician (1629–1673)

Sir Arthur Denny (1629 – 1673) was an Anglo-Irish politician.

== Biography ==
Denny was the son of Sir Edward Denny and Ruth Roper, daughter of Thomas Roper, 1st Viscount Baltinglass. In 1653 he restored the family seat at Tralee Castle after it had been damaged in the Irish Confederate Wars. He was the High Sheriff of Kerry in 1656 and was the Member of Parliament for County Kerry in the Irish House of Commons from 1661 to 1666. In 1669 he was appointed Vice-Admiral of Munster.

He married Ellen Barry, a daughter of David Barry, 1st Earl of Barrymore. He was succeeded in his estates by his son, Edward Denny.

Parliament of Ireland
Preceded by Hardress Waller; Henry Ingoldsby	Member of Parliament for County Kerry; 1661–1666; With: John Blennerhassett	Succeeded by Nicholas Brown; Sir Thomas Crosbie
