= Sir Barry Denny, 2nd Baronet =

- In office 1794–1794 Serving with John Gustavus Crosbie
- Preceded by: Sir Barry Denny, 1st Baronet; John Gustavus Crosbie
- Succeeded by: Maurice FitzGerald, 18th Knight of Kerry; John Gustavus Crosbie

Sir Barry Denny, 2nd Baronet (died 20 October 1794) was an Anglo-Irish politician, chiefly remembered for his death in a duel at the hands of John Gustavus Crosbie.

== Career ==
He served as an officer in the Kerry Militia, eventually becoming a Major. Following his father's death in April 1794, he became a baronet and was elected to his late father's seat in the Irish House of Commons, representing County Kerry. He also served as High Sheriff of Kerry in 1794. The Denny family were the dominant political influence in Tralee, where they owned most of the houses.

At a by-election for the seat in October that year, Denny promised to remain neutral and not come between the Crosbie, Blennerhassett and Herbert families who were contesting the seat. One of the candidates, John Gustavus Crosbie, took offence at one of Denny's remarks which he took to be a breach of his position of neutrality, and challenged him to a duel. Denny was shot through the head and killed by Crosbie in the ensuing duel.

He was about to be raised to the Peerage of Ireland as Baron Denmore when he was killed. The killing resulted in a bitter feud between the two families, and John Crosbie's sudden death in 1797 led to a local tradition that he had been poisoned by the Dennys in revenge.

== Family ==
Denny was the eldest son of Sir Barry Denny, 1st Baronet and his wife and cousin Jane Denny.

Barry Denny married Anne Morgell, the daughter of Crosbie Morgell, on 12 January 1794, when she was only sixteen, but died without issue, his title passing to his brother Edward. His widow remarried General Sir John Floyd, 1st Baronet, who died in 1818. They had no children, but she was fond of her stepdaughter Julia, and helped to arrange her marriage, which turned out very happily, to Sir Robert Peel. Robert and Julia nicknamed Anne "the Dow" (Dowager).

== Arms ==
Coat of arms of Sir Barry Denny, 2nd Baronet
Notes Confirmed by William Hawkins, Ulster King of Arms, 10 January 1782. Crest A cubit arm vested Azure turned up Argent holding in the hand Proper five ears of wheat Or. Escutcheon Gules a saltire Argent between twelve cross crosslets Or. Motto Et mea Messis Erit

Parliament of Ireland
Preceded by Sir Barry Denny, Bt; John Gustavus Crosbie	Member of Parliament for County Kerry; 1794; With: John Gustavus Crosbie	Succeeded by Maurice FitzGerald; John Gustavus Crosbie
Baronetage of Ireland
Preceded by Barry Denny	Baronet (of Castle Moyle); 1794	Succeeded by Edward Denny
