= Godfrey baronets =

Extinct baronetcy in the Baronetage of Ireland

The Godfrey Baronetcy of Bushfield in the County of Kerry was a title in the Baronetage of Ireland. It was created on 17 June 1785 for William Godfrey, member of the Irish House of Commons for Tralee. The title became extinct on the death of the seventh Baronet in 1971.

The Godfrey family had arrived in Ireland during the Cromwellian conquest. Major John Godfrey of Kent was an officer in the New Model Army, and was granted the estates of Killagha Abbey following their seizure from the Catholic Walter Spring. The estate amounted to approximately 7,000 acres. One of Major Godfrey's descendants, also John, founded the settlement at Milltown to serve as the economic focal point for his holdings. His eldest son was Sir William Godfrey, 1st Baronet, who rebuilt the family's principal residence at Bushfield House, Milltown, and renamed it Kilcolman Abbey, in reference to Killagha Abbey. His grandson was Sir William Duncan Godfrey, 3rd Baronet.

== Godfrey baronets, of Bushfield (1785) ==
- Sir William Godfrey, 1st Baronet (1739–1817)
- Sir John Godfrey, 2nd Baronet (1763–1841)
- Sir William Duncan Godfrey, 3rd Baronet (1797–1873)
- Sir John Fermor Godfrey, 4th Baronet (1828–1900)
- Sir William Cecil Godfrey, 5th Baronet (1857–1926)
- Sir John Ernest Godfrey, 6th Baronet (1864–1935)
- Sir William Maurice Godfrey, 7th Baronet (1909–1971)

Coat of arms of Godfrey of Bushfield
Crest A griffin passant Sable, holding a sceptre Or, in the dexter forepaw. Escutcheon Argent, a griffin passant wings indorsed Sable between three lions' heads erased Gules. Motto Arme de foi hardi
