= Thomas FitzMaurice, 1st Earl of Kerry =

Irish politician

THOMAS FITZMAURICE
- 1st Earl of Kerry

Origin
- Meaning: "Son of Maurice"
- Region of origin: Ireland and Britain

Other names
- Variant forms: FitzMaurice Fitz-Maurice; Fitz Maurice Fitzmorris

Thomas FitzMaurice, 1st Earl of Kerry PC (Ire) (1668 – 16 March 1741) was an Irish peer and politician.

== Life ==
He was the son of William FitzMaurice, 20th Baron Kerry, and Constance Long. He succeeded his father in March 1696/97 and was invested as a Privy Counsellor before April 1711. He was created Earl of Kerry on 17 January 1723, together with the subsidiary title Viscount Clanmaurice, both in the Peerage of Ireland. He had some military experience, and even his grandson Lord Shelburne, in a notably hostile character sketch, admitted that he showed courage and talent as a soldier. He was notorious for his hot temper, and even in an age when duelling was commonplace, he was reprimanded, and briefly imprisoned, for challenging John Methuen, the Lord Chancellor of Ireland to a duel.

FitzMaurice was a Member of the Irish House of Commons for County Kerry from 1692 to 1697.

== Family ==
He married Anne Petty (1671–1737), daughter of the scientist and philosopher Sir William Petty and his wife Elizabeth Waller, Baroness Shelburne, daughter of Sir Hardress Waller, in 1692. They had five children:

- William Fitzmaurice, 2nd Earl of Kerry
- John Petty FitzMaurice, 1st Earl Shelburne
- Elizabeth, who married Maurice Crosbie, 1st Baron Brandon
- Arabella Denny, who married Colonel Arthur Denny, and was a noted philanthropist
- Charlotte, who married Sir John Colthurst, 1st Baronet, first of the Colthurst baronets of Ardrum.

== Character ==
Thomas FitzMaurice was the grandfather of William Petty Fitzmaurice, Prime Minister of Great Britain (1782–1783). Shelburne left a most unflattering picture of his grandfather as "a tyrant... the most severe and inflexible character that can be imagined, obstinate and inflexible... his family did not love him but dreaded him, as did his servants". He praised his grandmother Anne Petty (whom he never knew personally) as a woman of superior intelligence and strong, who was the only person who could manage her husband. His picture of his grandfather must be treated with caution: it is based largely on other people's recollections of him since William was not quite four years old when the old man died, and thus can barely have remembered him.

Parliament of Ireland
Preceded by Nicholas Browne; Sir Thomas Crobie	Member of Parliament for County Kerry; 1692–1697; With: Edward Denny	Succeeded by Edward Denny; William Sandes
Peerage of Ireland
New creation	Earl of Kerry; 1723 – 1741	Succeeded by William FitzMaurice
Preceded by William FitzMaurice	Baron Kerry; 1697 – 1741	Succeeded by William FitzMaurice
