= Rowland Blennerhassett (priest) =

Irish archdeacon (1909–2008)

The Venerable Archdeacon Richard Noel Rowland Blennerhassett (19 December 1909 – 27 December 2008) was Archdeacon of Tuam from 1956 until 1969.

Blennerhassett was educated at Trinity College, Dublin and ordained in 1933. His early clerical appointments were as curate in Cobh from 1933–37, which included British Army and Navy Chaplaincy, and as Rector of Comeragh and Kilmacthomas from 1937-45. He held Incumbencies at Stradbally, Knappagh, Aughavale, Omey, Athenry and Westport.

In 1969, he moved to the Diocese of Cork, Cloyne and Ross, where he held the position of Rector of the Timoleague Union of Parishes, including Kilbrittain and Courtmacsherry, until his retirement in the early 1970s.

== Personal life ==
The Archdeacon and his wife, Betty (née Elizabeth Maraquita Graves Pierce; died 10 July 2004), had four children: Godfrey, Frank, Maraquita, and Patience.

Archdeacon Blennerhassett died at age 99 on 27 December 2008 at his residence, The Moorings, Fenit, Tralee, County Kerry.
