= John Blennerhassett (judge) =

English-born judge and politician

Sir John Blennerhassett (c. 1560–1624) was an English-born judge and politician who became Chief Baron of the Irish Exchequer and sat in the Irish House of Commons as MP for Belfast. He was a member of a prominent Norfolk family which acquired large estates in Ireland, mainly in County Fermanagh. The Blennerhassett family have an enduring connection with County Kerry.

== Family ==
He was born at Pockthorpe, near Lyng, Norfolk, a younger son of Sir Edward Blennerhassett and Susan Pickarell, daughter of John Pickarell of Cringleford. His father, who also held lands at Horsford, was a substantial landowner and magistrate, noted for his "Godly zeal" and staunchly Puritan views. He was knighted in 1603. John's brothers Edward and Thomas played a key part in the Plantation of Ulster and they and their father were granted large estates in Fermanagh. Robert Blennerhassett, the founder of the Blennerhassett family of Ballyseedy, County Kerry, was a cousin of the judge, as was the elder John Blennerhassett, who was Member of Parliament for Norwich in 1563 and 1571.

== Career ==
He studied law at Furnivall's Inn, then entered Lincoln's Inn in 1583, and was called to the Bar in 1591. In 1609 he became a Bencher of Lincoln's Inn and in the same year he was sent to Ireland as an extra Baron of the Court of Exchequer (Ireland), due to the "infirmity" of the existing Barons; he ranked in seniority directly after the Chief Baron, Sir John Denham. He became a member of the King's Inn and became Treasurer in 1611, and had his own chamber in the Inn. He was knighted by James I at Hampton Court in 1609. He had a reputation for being a "good servant of the Crown" and sat as MP for Belfast in the only Irish Parliament of the reign (1613-15). To be both a sitting judge and an MP was unheard of in England, but not unusual in Ireland, and there were several High Court judges in the 1613-15 Parliament. He was a Commissioner for the Plantation of Wexford and a Commissioner of the Court of Wards. He enjoyed the patronage of the powerful Munster magnate Richard Boyle, 1st Earl of Cork, and arranged the marriage of Lord Cork's seven-year-old daughter Sarah to Thomas Moore, son of Garret Moore, 1st Viscount Moore (who predeceased his father).

Elrington Ball attributes his promotion to the office of Chief Baron in 1621 to his powerful political connections. He was praised by the Privy Council of Ireland as "an ancient counsellor.... thought by the Lord Chancellor of Ireland and others to be fit for [the office of Chief Baron]". Ball admits that he was a conscientious judge of assize, going mainly on the northeastern circuit.

== Death and burial ==
Blennerhassett died on 14 November 1624 and was buried "within the choir" of St. Patrick's Cathedral, Dublin. His wife Ursula died in 1638 and was buried beside him. The inscription which was added to the tomb after her burial records that several of their children had died in the meantime, including Henry, their eldest son, who was a member of the British Guiana Company, in which capacity he settled in South America, where he drowned in the Amazon River in 1632.

== Wife and children ==
In 1593 he married Ursula Duke, daughter of Edward Duke of Benhall, Suffolk, who was the grandfather of Sir Edward Duke, 1st Baronet, and his wife Dorothy Jermyn. Ursula died in April 1638. Ball quotes part of her will as evidence of the wealth that the Blennerhassett family had acquired, and also of the pomp and circumstance in which a senior judge and his wife were then expected to live: Lady Blennerhassett bequeathed to her heirs a carriage and horses, much silver plate, several beds, a cabinet, diamonds, pearls, and satin and velvet gowns. She also possessed some real property, which she left to her daughter Anne's husband, Philip Ferneley, Clerk to the House of Commons.

They had at least seven children:

- Henry (c.1594-1632) a barrister; as noted above, he drowned in the Amazon River while engaged in the early unsuccessful British attempt to colonise Guiana.
- Ambrose, dead by 1638.
- Edward, dead by 1638.
- John, died young.
- Elizabeth (died 1647) married Charles Monck, Surveyor General of the Customs for Ireland and had issue.
- Dorothy (died 1650), married Francis Sacheverell junior of Richhill Castle, Legacorry, County Armagh, and had one daughter, Anne, who married Major Edward Richardson and had issue.
- Anne, married Philip Ferneley, Clerk to the Irish House of Commons, and had issue. Philip, who was a firm Royalist and a protégé of James Butler, 1st Duke of Ormonde, was first appointed in 1628, and was still serving as Clerk in 1665.

Since none of his sons had children, their father's estates were divided between their sisters' heirs. Henry left most of his personal property to his sister Elizabeth. Her descendants included Charles Monck, 1st Viscount Monck.
