= Sir Barry Denny, 1st Baronet =

Sir Barry Denny, 1st Baronet (c. 1744 – April 1794) was an Anglo-Irish politician. The Denny family effectively owned the town of Tralee.

== Biography ==
Denny was the son of Reverend Barry Denny and Jane O'Connor. He served in the Tralee Corps of the Irish Volunteers, becoming a colonel. He later gained the rank of Major in the service of the Kerry Militia. He was elected to the Irish House of Commons as the Member of Parliament for County Kerry, representing the seat between 1769 and 1776, and again between 1783 and 1794. In 1774, he held the office of High Sheriff of Kerry. He was created a baronet, of Castle Moyle in the Baronetage of Ireland on 12 January 1782.

Denny married a cousin, Jane, the daughter of Sir Thomas Denny and Agnes Blennerhassett, in 1767. Together they had eight children, including the second and third baronets.

== Arms ==
Coat of arms of Sir Barry Denny, 1st Baronet
Notes Confirmed by William Hawkins, Ulster King of Arms, 10 January 1782. Crest A cubit arm vested Azure turned up Argent holding in the hand Proper five ears of wheat Or. Escutcheon Gules a saltire Argent between twelve cross crosslets Or. Motto Et mea Messis Erit

Parliament of Ireland
Preceded by Thomas Fitzmaurice; John Blennerhassett	Member of Parliament for County Kerry; 1768–1776 and 1783–1794; With: Arthur Blennerhassett; John Blennerhassett; John Gustavus Crosbie	Succeeded by Maurice FitzGerald; John Gustavus Crosbie
Baronetage of Ireland
New creation	Baronet (of Castle Moyle); 1782–1794	Succeeded by Barry Denny
