= John Blennerhassett (died 1709) =

Anglo-Irish politician

John Blennerhassett (c. 1660 – 1709) was an Anglo-Irish politician who represented various constituencies in the Irish House of Commons.

Blennerhassett was born on the family estate at Ballyseedy, County Kerry, the son of John Blennerhassett and Elisabeth Denny. He was first elected as a Member of Parliament in 1692, representing Tralee. He served as MP for Dingle between 1695 and 1699. He was subsequently MP for County Kerry between 1703 and his death in 1709.

He married Margaret Crosbie, the daughter of Patrick Crosbie and Agnes Freke, and together they had six sons and one daughter. His eldest son was the MP, John Blennerhassett.

Parliament of Ireland
Preceded by Maurice Hussey; James Hackett	Member of Parliament for Tralee; 1692–1695; With: James Waller	Succeeded by John St Leger; Frederick William Mullins
Preceded by William FitzMaurice; Frederick William Mullins	Member of Parliament for Dingle; 1695–1699; With: William FitzMaurice	Succeeded by William FitzMaurice; Francis Brewster
Preceded by Edward Denny; William Sandes	Member of Parliament for County Kerry; 1703–1709; With: Edward Denny	Succeeded by Edward Denny; John Blennerhassett
