= Arthur Blennerhassett (1719–1799) =

Anglo-Irish politician

Arthur Blennerhassett (19 February 1719 – 8 June 1799) was an Anglo-Irish politician.

== Biography ==
Blennerhassett was the son of John Blennerhassett and Jane Denny. He was elected to serve in the Irish House of Commons as the Member of Parliament for Tralee between 1743 and 1761. In 1775 he was elected as the MP for County Kerry, sitting until 1783.

He married Jane Girardot (former wife of Gustavus Hamilton [deceased] and mother of James Hamilton who later became Dean of Cloyne and the first astronomer of Armagh Observatory); together they had two daughters.

Parliament of Ireland
Preceded by John Blennerhassett; Arthur Blennerhassett	Member of Parliament for Tralee; 1794–1797; With: John Blennerhassett	Succeeded by Rowland Bateman; Edward Herbert
Preceded by Barry Denny; John Blennerhassett	Member of Parliament for County Kerry; 1775–1783; With: Barry Denny (1775–1776); Rowland Bateman (1776–1783)	Succeeded by Sir Barry Denny, Bt; Richard Townsend Herbert
