= Churchfield, County Mayo =

Townland in County Mayo, Ireland

Coordinates: 53.781°N 9.562°W

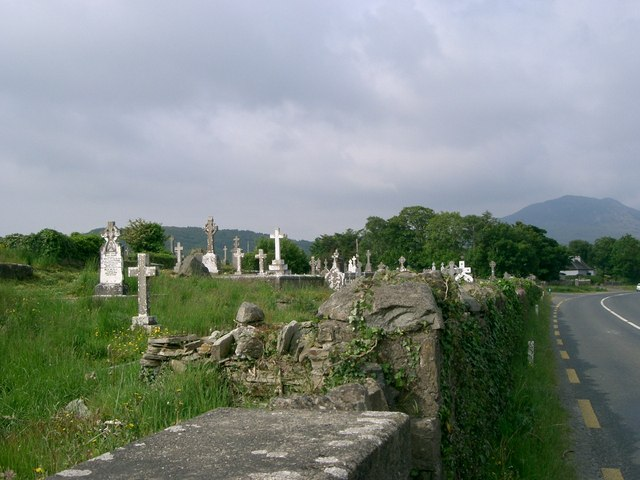
Aughavale cemetery in Churchfield

Churchfield (Irish: An Nuachabháil) is a townland in the barony of Murrisk and civil parish of Oughaval. Its Irish name, An Nuachabháil, is the same as that of Oughaval. Aughavale cemetery with its ancient ruined church are contained within the townland.
Churchfield borders the following four townlands: Streamstown to the north, Ardoley to the east, Aghamore to the south, and Knockaraha East to the west.
