= Sir Rowland Blennerhassett, 1st Baronet =

Anglo-Irish lawyer and baronet (1741–1821)

Colonel Sir Rowland Blennerhassett, 1st Baronet (1741 - 14 March 1821) was an Anglo-Irish lawyer and baronet.

== Life ==
Blennerhassett was the son of Robert Blennerhassett and Frances Yielding. He was the great-grandson of Robert Blennerhassett MP.

He trained as an attorney and practised law. He was the colonel of the 'Laune Rangers' militia regiment of volunteers from 1779 to 1782. Between 1796 and 1797 he was a Justice of the Peace in County Kerry. Blennerhassett resettled his family at Cahirmoreaun, just outside Tralee, renaming both the house and the village Blennerville in his family's honour. He built a large new family home at Churchtown House, Knockane. In 1800 he was granted permission to hold four fairs a year and one market a week in Blennerville, which providing him with extra income. Blennerhassett established in Blennerville a windmill around 1800 which still exists and a Church of Ireland school, called the Erasmus Smith School, in 1812. On 22 September 1809 he was created a baronet of Blennerville in the County of Kerry, in the Baronetage of the United Kingdom. He was confirmed the right to bear the family coat of arms a year earlier.

== Family ==
Blennerhassett married his first cousin, Millicent Agnes Yielding, the daughter of Richard Yielding, on 31 October 1762; she was killed in an accident in 1801, receiving a blow from one of the sails of their windmill. Together, they had five children:

- Sir Robert Blennerhassett, 2nd Baronet (26 January 1769 – 21 September 1831), married Rosanna Blennerhassett
- Richard Francis Blennerhassett (23 May 1772 - November 1827), married Agnes Denny, daughter of Sir Barry Denny, 1st Baronet
- Arthur Blennerhassett (27 October 1776 – 31 May 1839), married Hon. Helena Jane Mullins, daughter of Thomas Mullins, 1st Baron Ventry
- Rowland Blennerhassett (26 December 1780 – 12 April 1854), married Letitia Hurly
- William Blennerhassett (26 December 1780 - 1842), married Elizabeth Blennerhassett

Baronetage of the United Kingdom
New creation	Baronet (of Blennerville); 1809–1821	Succeeded by Robert Blennerhassett
