= John Blennerhassett (1691–1775) =

Anglo-Irish politician

Colonel John Blennerhassett (1691 – 5 May 1775) was an Anglo-Irish politician who represented two constituencies in the Irish House of Commons between 1709 and 1775.

Blennerhassett was born in County Kerry, the eldest son of John Blennerhassett and Margaret Crosbie. He served in the Kerry Militia and was a colonel by 1756. He was first elected as a Member of Parliament in 1709, taking his father's seat representing County Kerry. Between 1713 and 1715, he was MP for Tralee. He was again returned as the MP for Kerry in 1715, serving until 1727. He served as High Sheriff of Kerry in 1717. Between 1727 and 1760, he served as the MP for Tralee, before serving as MP for Kerry for a third period between 1761 and his death in 1775. He was Father of the Irish House of Commons.

He married Jane Denny, with whom he had two sons, John and Arthur, and four daughters, including Mary, who married Lancelot Crosbie, who like his father-in-law was MP for Kerry.

Parliament of Ireland
Preceded by Edward Denny; John Blennerhassett	Member of Parliament for County Kerry; 1709–1713; With: Edward Denny	Succeeded by Edward Denny; Sir Maurice Crosbie
Preceded by Samuel Morris; Arthur Hyde	Member of Parliament for Tralee; 1713–1715; With: Samuel Morris	Succeeded by Samuel Morris; Robert Taylor
Preceded by Edward Denny; Sir Maurice Crosbie	Member of Parliament for County Kerry; 1715–1727; With: Sir Maurice Crosbie	Succeeded by Arthur Denny; Sir Maurice Crosbie
Preceded by Luke Gardiner; William Sprigge	Member of Parliament for Tralee; 1727–1760; With: Arthur Blennerhassett (1727–1743); Arthur Blennerhassett (1743–1760)	Succeeded by Rowland Bateman; Edward Herbert
Preceded by John Blennerhassett; Lancelot Crosbie	Member of Parliament for County Kerry; 1761–1775; With: Viscount FitzMaurice; John Blennerhassett (1762–1763); Thomas FitzMaurice (1763–1768); Barry Denny (1768–1775)	Succeeded by Barry Denny; Arthur Blennerhassett
