= Flesk Castle =

Historic house in County Kerry, Ireland

Coordinates: 52.0513°N 9.4778°W

General information
- Location: County Kerry, Ireland

Flesk Castle was a historic country house in County Kerry in Ireland. It has since been ruined.

== House ==
Flesk Castle, also known as Coltsmann’s Castle or Glenflesk Castle, was a gothic Georgian style country house, built 1809–1815 for John Coltsmann. The house was in use through the 1940s but was dismantled c. 1950 leaving the shell standing.

It was built in the early decades of the 19th century and continued in the Coltsmann family and their descendants until the early 20th century when it was sold to Major John McGillycuddy in the early 20th century. The Flesk Castle site was bought in 2005 by the O’Reilly family.
