= John Blennerhassett (landowner) =

16th-century English politician

John Blennerhassett or Hasset (by 1521 – 1573), of Barsham by Beccles, Suffolk, was an English landowner and Member of Parliament. His cousins became substantial landowners in Ireland.

He was the fourth son of Sir Thomas Blennerhassett of Frenze, near Diss, Norfolk and Margaret Braham. Originally from Cumberland, the Blennerhassetts had become substantial landowners in Suffolk and Norfolk, where John Blennerhassett held estates at Depwade and Long Stratton.

His father was steward to Thomas Howard, 2nd Duke of Norfolk and John was to continue the family tradition of service to the family. He entered the Inner Temple in 1535 In the 1540s, following the death of his elder brothers without male heirs, he inherited his family's entailed estate. He continued his career as a lawyer, served as a legal adviser to Thomas Howard, 3rd Duke of Norfolk and was called to the bench in 1550.

In 1558 he was returned as one of the two Members of Parliament for Horsham through the influence of the Howards. He was subsequently selected for Norwich, where he served as steward, in 1563 and 1571. He seems never to have spoken in the House. He presented two silver cups to the corporation of Norwich in 1562.

He married firstly Elizabeth, daughter of Sir John Cornwallis of Brome, Suffolk, by whom he had a daughter Elizabeth. Elizabeth died sometime after April 1544 and John subsequently married Mary Echyngham (younger daughter of Sir Edward Echyngham and his second wife Ann Everard), through whom he gained possession of Barsham. John and Mary had 6 sons and 5 daughters, 9 of whom were living when John made his will. He wrote his will in June 1573 and it was proved by his eldest son Thomas the following February.

His cousin, Sir Edward Blennerhassett of Horsford, was the father of another Sir John Blennerhassett, a barrister who became Chief Baron of the Irish Exchequer, and also of Thomas and Edward, who played a part in the Plantation of Ulster. Another cousin, Robert Blennerhassett, founded the long-established Blennerhassett family of Ballyseedy, County Kerry.
