= Blennerhassett baronets =

Baronetcy in the Baronetage of the United Kingdom

Blennerhassett Coat of Arms

The Blennerhassett Baronetcy of Blennerville in the County of Kerry, is a title in the Baronetage of the United Kingdom. It was created on 22 September 1809 for the Anglo-Irish lawyer Rowland Blennerhassett, He was from a family originally from Cumberland, England, that settled in County Kerry during the reign of James I and represented County Kerry and Tralee in the Irish House of Commons.

The 2nd Baronet was High Sheriff of Kerry in 1823. The 4th Baronet was a Liberal politician.

== Blennerhassett baronets, of Blennerville (1809) ==
- Sir Rowland Blennerhassett, 1st Baronet (1741–1821)
- Sir Robert Blennerhassett, 2nd Baronet (1769–1831)
- Sir Arthur Blennerhassett, 3rd Baronet (1794–1849)
- Sir Rowland Blennerhassett, 4th Baronet (1839–1909)
- Sir Arthur Charles Francis Bernard Blennerhassett, 5th Baronet (1871–1915)
- Sir Marmaduke Charles Henry Joseph Blennerhassett, 6th Baronet (1902–1940)
- Sir (Marmaduke) Adrian Francis William Blennerhassett, 7th Baronet (1940–2022)
- Sir Charles Henry Marmaduke Blennerhassett, 8th Baronet (born 1975).

The heir apparent is the current baronet's only son Benjamin Casimir Marmaduke Blennerhassett (born 2015)

== Extended family ==
Rowland Ponsonby Blennerhassett, grandson of Rowland Blennerhassett, fourth son of the 1st Baronet, represented County Kerry in the House of Commons, elected in 1872.

== Notes ==
Baronetage of the United Kingdom
Preceded by Shaw baronets	Blennerhassett baronets of Blennerville; 22 September 1809	Succeeded by Smith baronets
