= John Blennerhassett (1715–1763) =

Anglo-Irish lawyer and politician (1715-1763)

John Blennerhassett (15 June 1715 – 1763) was an Anglo-Irish politician.

Blennerhassett was the son of the politician, John Blennerhassett, and Jane Denny. He was admitted to Middle Temple in 1733 and subsequently practised as a lawyer. He held the office of High Sheriff of Kerry in 1740. In 1751 he was elected to the Irish House of Commons as the Member of Parliament for County Kerry, serving until 1761. In 1762 he was re-elected and sat as the MP for Kerry until his death the following year.

He married, firstly, Anne Crosbie, daughter of Colonel William Crosbie and Isabella Smyth, on 21 February 1736. He married, secondly, Frances Herbert, daughter of Edward Herbert and Hon. Frances Browne, on 10 April 1753.
