= Edward Denny (1676–1727) =

Irish politician

Edward Denny was an Irish politician.

Denny was born in County Kerry and educated at Trinity College, Dublin.

Deny represented Askeaton from 1715 to 1727.
