= Valentine Browne =

Valentine Browne may refer to several members of the family of the Earl of Kenmare:

- Sir Valentine Browne (died 1589)
- Sir Valentine Browne (died 1626), MP for Lincolnshire (UK Parliament constituency), 1610–1614
- Sir Valentine Browne, 1st Baronet (died 1633) of the Browne baronets of Molahiffe
- Sir Valentine Browne, 2nd Baronet (died 1640) of the Browne baronets of Molahiffe
- Valentine Browne, 1st Viscount Kenmare, 3rd Baronet (1638–1694)
- Valentine Browne, 3rd Viscount Kenmare, 5th Baronet (1695–1736)
- Valentine Browne, 1st Earl of Kenmare (1754–1812)
- Valentine Browne, 2nd Earl of Kenmare (1788–1853)
- Valentine Browne, 4th Earl of Kenmare (1825–1905), Member of Parliament 1852–1871
- Valentine Browne, 5th Earl of Kenmare (1860–1941)
- Valentine Browne, 6th Earl of Kenmare (1891–1943)

It may also refer to:

- Valentine Browne, OFM (c. 1594–1672), Irish Franciscan theologian
