= Walter Spring =

Anglo-Irish Roman Catholic landowner

- Born: 1620; Killagha Abbey
- Died: c.1678
- Spouse: Juliana Fitzgerald
- Children: Thomas Spring; Mary Spring
- Parent(s): Edward Spring, Anne Browne

Walter Spring the Unfortunate (1620 – c.1678) was an Anglo-Irish Roman Catholic landowner involved in the Irish Confederate Wars.

== Biography ==
Spring was the son of Thomas Spring, a lawyer. He was the grandson of Walter Spring, who had served as High Sheriff of Kerry, and the great-grandson of Captain Thomas Spring, Constable of Castlemaine. He inherited the family estates in County Kerry from his father, including Killagha Abbey, where he was born and brought up.

Unlike the previous generations of his family, Walter Spring was raised as a Catholic. His control of the strategic fortress at Castlemaine and the lands surrounding Milltown made him an important figure in Kerry. He attended the 1642 Kilkenny meeting of Catholic gentry which established the Association of the Confederate Catholics of Ireland and was active in helping to organise the war effort on behalf of the Catholic rebels. During the Cromwellian conquest of Ireland, Spring's fortified manor house at Killagha Abbey was attacked by soldiers of the New Model Army armed with canon, leading to its destruction. Cromwell seized Spring's extensive estates and granted Killagha to one of his supporters, Major John Godfrey.

Following the defeat of the Confederacy, Spring retained only a small portion of his estate. In order to protect it, he occasionally attended Protestant services. However, he was thought to still pose a significant threat by The Protectorate government and was transplanted to County Clare, where he had little influence, under the Act for the Settlement of Ireland 1652. This led to him being dubbed ‘The Unfortunate’ by both opponents and supporters. His remaining estates in Kerry were transferred to his son, Thomas.

== Ancestry ==
Ancestors of Walter Spring

16. Thomas Spring
8. Thomas Spring of Castlemaine
17. Julian Fairey
4. Walter Spring, High Sheriff of Kerry
18. John Browne, Master of Awney
9. Annabella Browne
19. Catherine O'Ryan
2. Edward Spring
10. Padraig Mac Chrosáin
5. Mary Crosbie (sister of Piers Crosby)
11. Catherine O'More
1. Walter Spring
24. Sir Valentine Browne
12. Sir Valentine Browne
6. Sir Nicholas Browne
26. Robert Bacon
13. Thomazine Bacon (sister of Nicholas Bacon)
27. Eleanor (Isabel) Cage
3. Anna Browne
28. Dermod An-Phudar O'Sullivan Beare, Lord of Beare
14. Eoin O'Sullivan Beare, Lord of Beare
29. Lady Julia McCarthy (do. Donal MacCarthy Reagh)
7. Julia/Sighile O'Sullivan
30. James de Barry, 4th Viscount Buttevant
15. Helena Barry
31. Ellen MacCarthy Reagh
