= Killagha Abbey =

Augustinian abbey in Kerry, Ireland

Killagha or Kilcolman Abbey
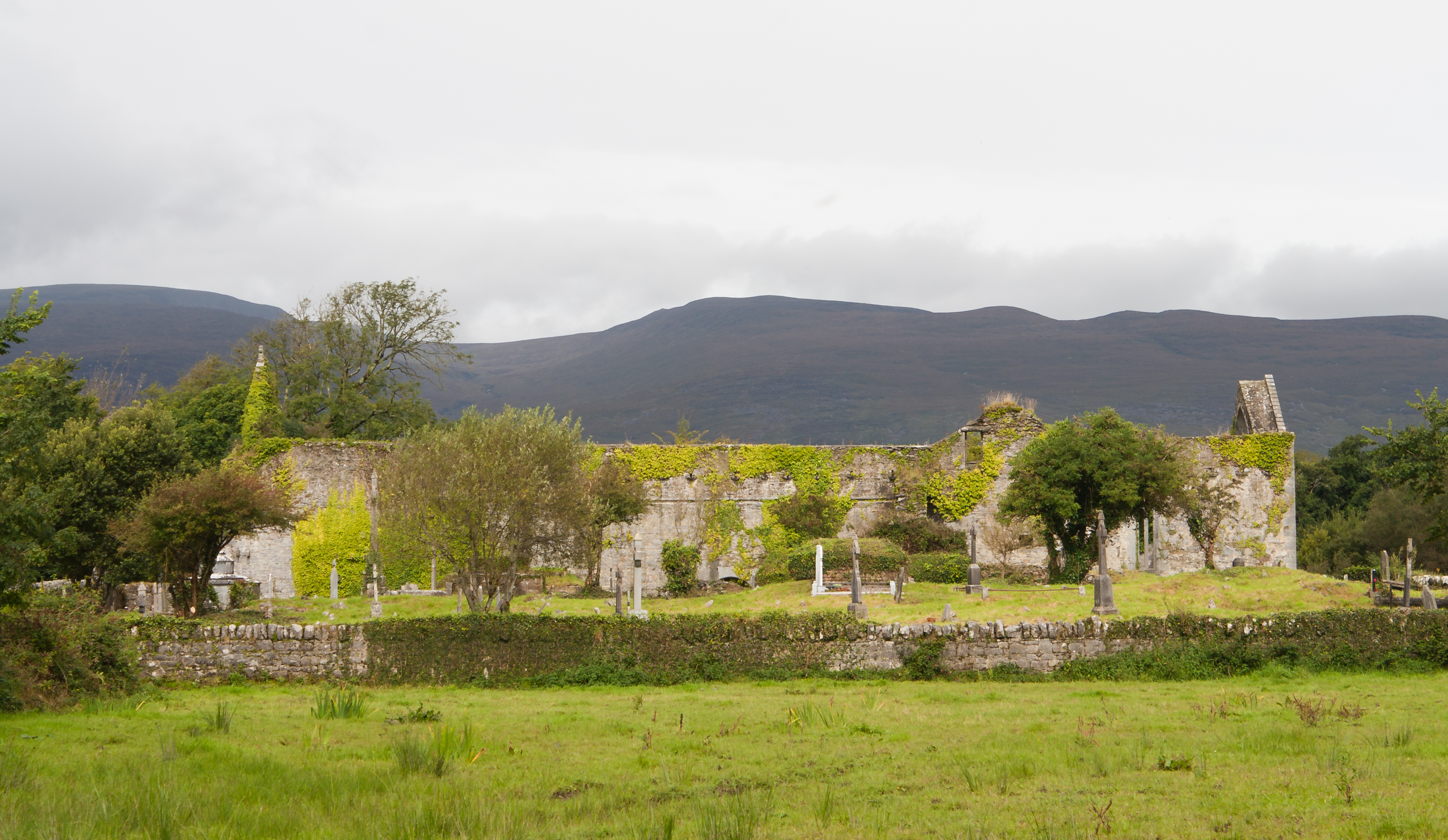
- The remaining ruins of Killagha Abbey
- Interactive map of Killagha or Kilcolman Abbey

Monastery information
- Full name: Killagha Abbey of St Mary de Bello Loco
- Order: Augustinians
- Established: c.1216
- Disestablished: 1576
- Diocese: Diocese of Ardfert

People
- Founder: Geoffrey de Marisco
- Important associated figures: Saint Colman; Walter Spring

Site
- Location: Milltown, County Kerry, Ireland
- Coordinates: 52°08′59″N 9°43′50″W

Killagha Abbey of Our Lady of Bello Loco, also called Kilcolman Abbey, is a ruined Augustinian abbey and former manor house in County Kerry, Ireland. The abbey is 1 km north-west of Milltown, near the River Maine.

== History ==
The abbey was founded in circa 1216 on the site of an earlier monastery, which had been erected by Saint Colman. This earlier foundation gave rise to the abbey sometimes being called Kilcolman, meaning Church of Colman. The abbey was established by Geoffrey de Marisco, Justicier of Ireland, an Anglo-Norman nobleman who had received large grants of land in Munster from John, King of England. The abbey, dedicated to the Virgin Mary, was occupied by Canons Regular of the Order of St Augustine until its suppression in 1576 during the Reformation in Ireland.

It was a very wealthy institution, owning large amounts of land across Munster, and the Prior of Killagha was a member of the Irish House of Lords. It paid the third highest rate of tax in the Diocese of Ardfert in 1302. The abbey had a lepper house and a hospital. The large east window was added in the 15th century. Killagha was a notable destination for pilgrims, and it became well known for its beautiful setting, hence the name 'Bello Loco'. Its distance from Dublin meant that it was dissolved later than most abbeys in Ireland. However, its proximity to the fortress at Castle Maine during the Desmond Rebellions brought it to the attention of The Crown, which gave orders for the establishment to be closed.

Following the abbey's seizure by the Crown, the buildings and land were leased to Thomas Clinton, one of Queen Elizabeth I's officers in County Kerry. In 1583, the lease was given briefly to Sir William Stanley. On 12 December 1588, the Crown transferred the abbey and its estate to Captain Thomas Spring of Castlemaine, a Protestant nobleman who had served with distinction during the Desmond Rebellions and was a grandson of Thomas Spring of Lavenham. The grant included a special clause to rebuild the domestic buildings of the abbey in a castle-like manner, so that the building could serve as a defensive structure. Captain Thomas Spring's son, Walter Spring, was High Sheriff of Kerry in 1609.

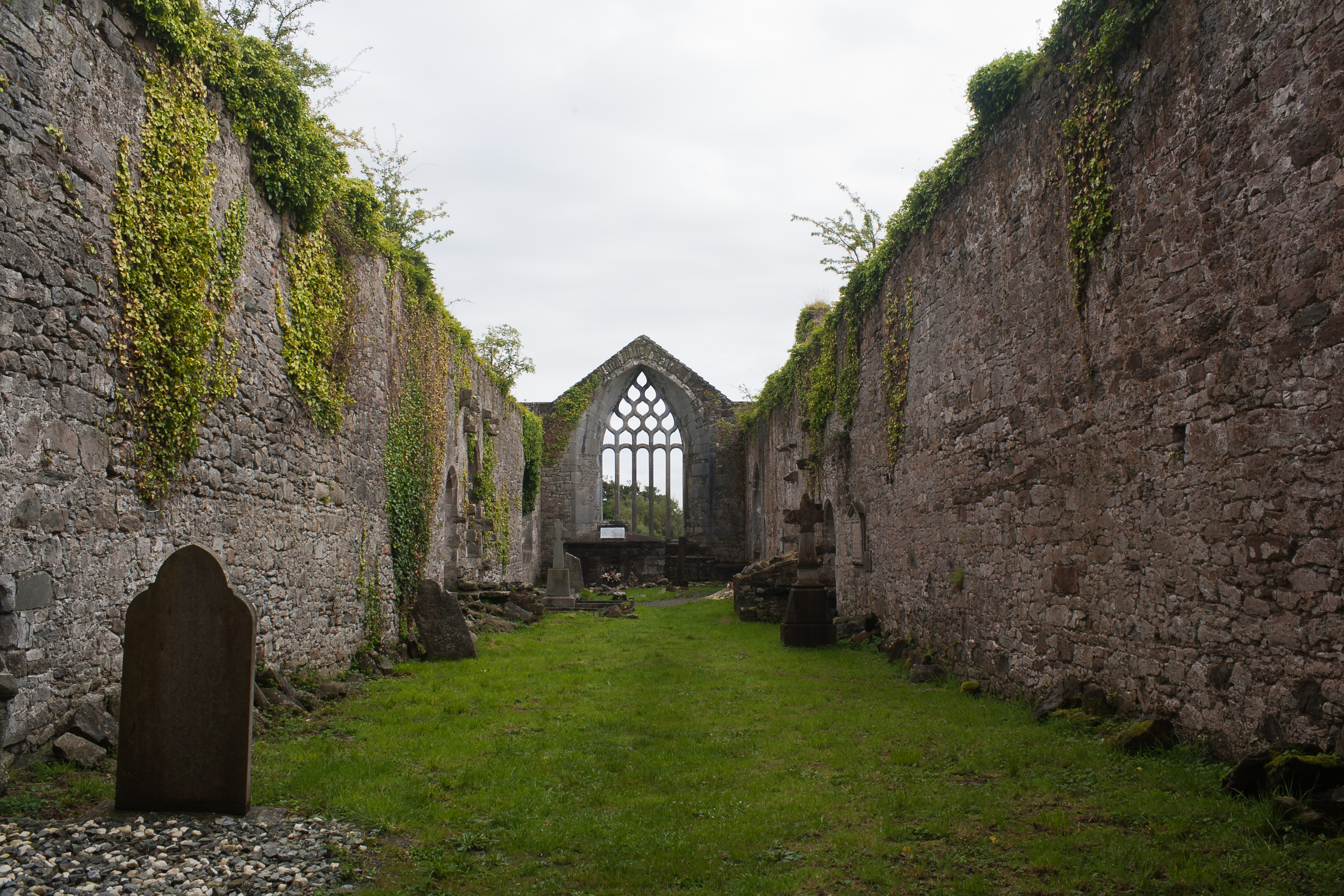
The ruined nave of the abbey, looking east

His grandson, Walter Spring, was raised as a Roman Catholic and fought in the Irish Rebellion of 1641. As a result, the abbey was attacked by a Cromwellian army during the Irish Confederate Wars. The fortified domestic buildings were demolished by cannon fire, while the church was partially damaged. Following the suppression of the rebellion, almost all of Walter Spring's lands were seized by Oliver Cromwell and he was subsequently dubbed 'The Unfortunate'. Killagha Abbey was granted to a Cromwellian soldier, Major John Godfrey. Despite the readjustment of lands in Ireland under Charles II, the grant to Major Godfrey was confirmed in the Act of Settlement 1662. However, with the abbey's manor house destroyed, the abbey was no longer used as a dwelling place. The Godfrey family built a new stately home in Milltown in 1772, which they named Kilcolman Abbey, but was also known as Bushfield House. It was abandoned and demolished in 1977.

Some of the materials were removed for the construction of nearby houses and the new manor house, and the abbey church gradually fell into disrepair and ruin. For the following 300 years, the land immediately surrounding the church was used as a cemetery. The abbey ruins are now protected as the Kilcolman Burial Ground.
