= Castle Maine =

Former castle in County Kerry, Ireland

- Castlemaine, County Kerry, Ireland
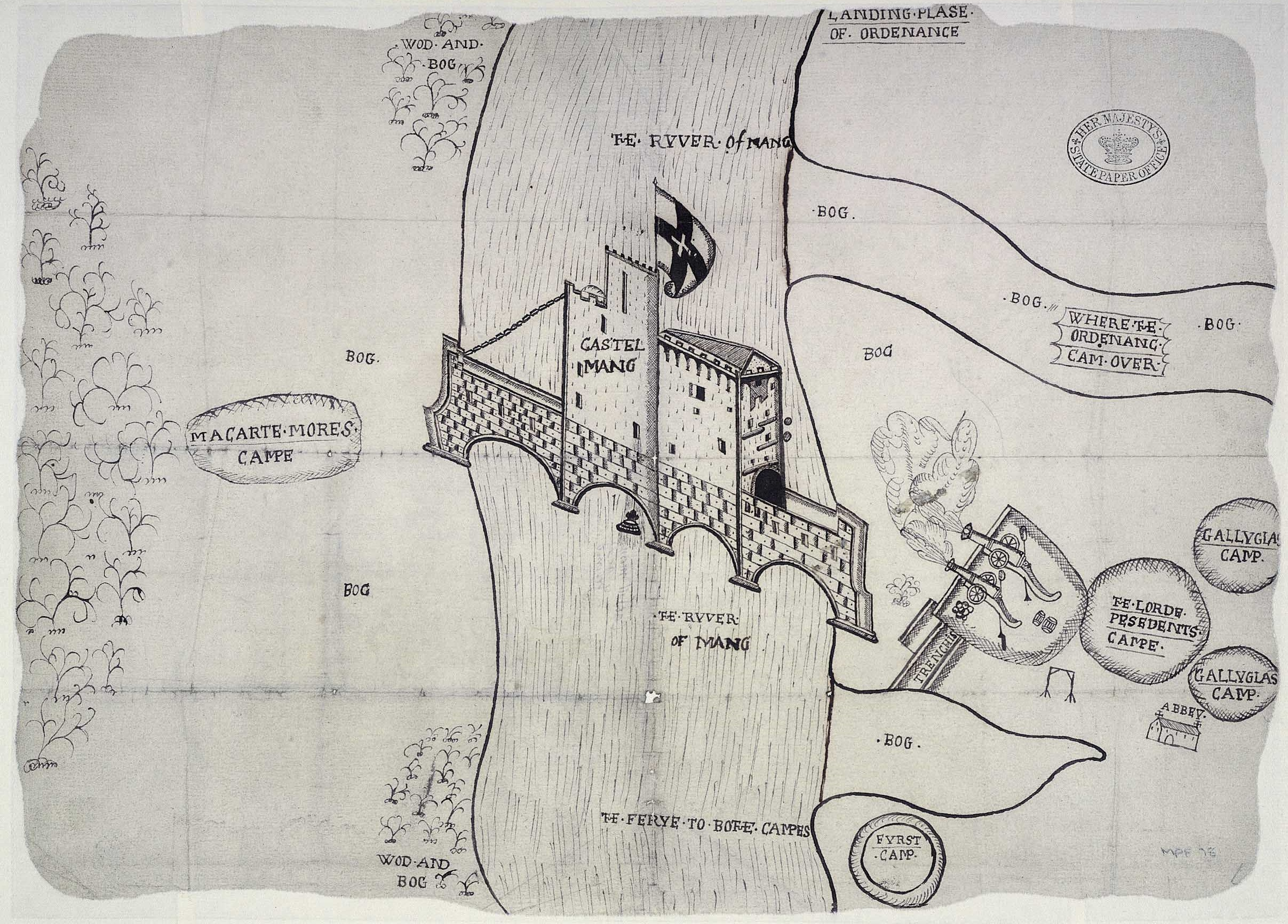
- Plan of John Perrot's siege of Castle Maine in 1572

Site information
- Type: Castle
- Condition: Demolished

Location
- Coordinates: 52.1674°N 9.7025°W

Site history
- Built: 1215
- Built for: FitzGerald dynasty
- Demolished: 1652
- Battles/wars: Desmond Rebellions; Nine Years' War; Irish Confederate Wars; Cromwellian Conquest of Ireland

Castle Maine, also recorded as Castle Magne and Castlemaine, was a medieval castle located at what is now Castlemaine, County Kerry. The castle, built in 1215, stood on a bridge over the River Maine. A defensive structure of considerable importance in Munster, it belonged first to the Earls of Desmond and later to the English Crown. Castle Maine was besieged on several occasions, including during the Nine Years' War when the garrison resisted for thirteen months. It was destroyed in 1652 during the Cromwellian conquest of Ireland.

== History ==
Castle Maine was built by Maurice Fitzgerald, possibly a son of Thomas FitzMaurice FitzGerald, in 1215. The structure was located in the middle of a substantial stone bridge crossing the River Maine, which marked the southern boundary of territory newly conquered by the FitzGeralds from the MacCarthy Mor dynasty in the early thirteenth century. The river regularly flooded during heavy rains and became impassable, giving the crossing point at Castle Maine strategic significance. A drawing of the castle from 1600 survives, showing the castle as having two central towers of unequal height, protected by walls and with a portcullis and drawbridge facing towards the southern end of the bridge. The foundations of the bridge remain, and are unusually broad with large arches, indicating the size of the structure which once stood above them. A local legend that the castle was built jointly by the FitzGeralds and MacCarthy Mor is fictitious.

Maurice FitzGerald, 2nd Earl of Desmond is recorded as having died at the castle in 1358. In 1510, an army led by Gerald FitzGerald, 9th Earl of Kildare took the castle, although it later returned to the control of the Desmonds.

=== Desmond Rebellions ===
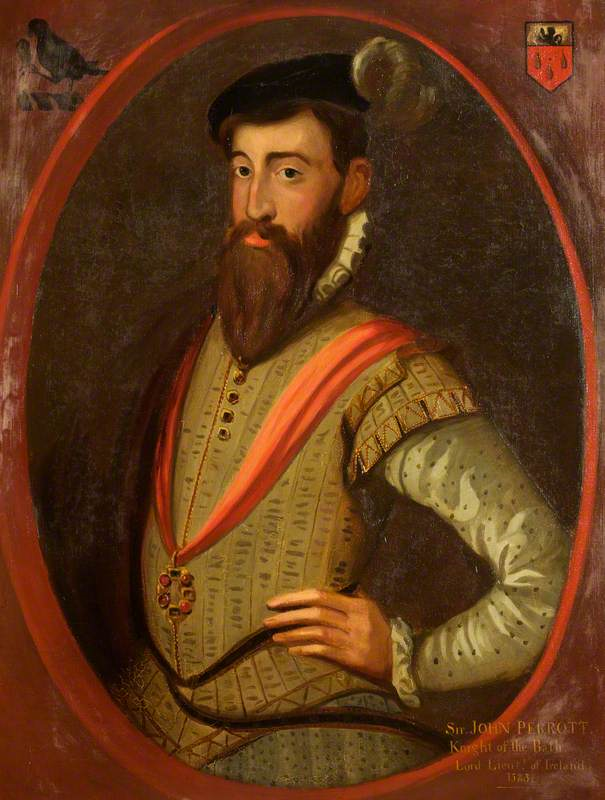
Sir John Perrot, Lord Deputy of Ireland, laid siege to the castle in 1571 and 1572

During the Desmond Rebellions, Castle Maine became one of the last remaining possessions of the Desmonds and was attacked by the English army of Sir John Perrot in 1571. Perrot summoned the chieftains of Munster to meet him at the castle with their forces on 24 June 1571, in order to lay siege to the fortress. In a letter to William Cecil, 1st Baron Burghley, Perrot emphasised the importance of the castle and the "necessity of winning it". Gerald FitzGerald, 14th Earl of Desmond directed his cousin, James Fitzmaurice, to defend the castle. Despite use of cannon against the castle walls, Perrot was forced to abandon the siege at the end of July 1571 as he was running out of gunpowder.

A year later, in June 1572, Perrot again laid siege to the castle assisted by Maurice Roche, 6th Viscount Fermoy, and Donald McCarthy, 1st Earl of Clancare. Perrot's forces reputedly included Scottish gallowglass and native Irish components. The garrison of thirty men, defending Castle Maine, surrendered after a twelve-week siege had exhausted their provisions. From this point, Castle Maine became an English Crown fortress. The castle was occupied by English soldiers with a standing garrison of twelve men and placed under the command of a Constable, the first of which was John Herbert. Perrot submitted a report to London in which he recommended that the castle should be re-edified and that the lands of the nearby Killagha Abbey be annexed to it.

On the night of 24 December 1573, the castle gates were unlocked to a group of men loyal to Lord Desmond, who seized the castle and ejected the English garrison. The following day, the Prior of Killagha Abbey came to the castle to give thanks for its return to Desmond control. An English Crown inquiry into the loss of Castle Maine was opened in 1574; in January 1574, Queen Elizabeth I wrote to Sir William FitzWilliam complaining of Desmond's "undutiful behaviour in taking Castle Maine". In September 1574, Desmond surrendered Castle Maine to the English as part of the settlement to end the rebellion.

In 1576, the castle had a garrison of "3 horsemen, 13 footmen". On 15 February 1578, Desmond petitioned the Queen to be "restored to the possession of Castle Maine"; this request was rejected.

In 1580, during the Second Desmond Rebellion, the castle was visited by Sir William Pelham and reinforced with men and supplies in anticipation of a Spanish attack, which did not materialise. Nonetheless, the Constable of Castle Maine, Andrew Martyn, was killed while leading the castle's garrison in the Siege of Smerwick.

In 1587, Queen Elizabeth sent an order to the Dublin Castle administration to disband Castle Maine's garrison and give the property to Sir Valentine Browne; however, the order was never enacted. In 1588, Sir William Herbert petitioned to have the castle demolished on the basis of its cost and insinuating that its Constable, Thomas Spring, was more loyal to the Irish than to England.

=== Nine Years' War ===
The castle returned to importance during the Nine Years' War. By December 1597, Sir Thomas Norris recorded that it was the last remaining castle in Munster outside Cork which had not surrendered to forces loyal to Hugh O'Neill, Earl of Tyrone. In October 1598, a force led by the rebel James FitzThomas FitzGerald laid siege to the castle. In January 1599, he departed, leaving 200 men to continue the siege. The castle surrendered the following November, having endured thirteenth months of siege without support from the English garrison at Cork. The Constable, Sir Warham St Leger was heavily criticised for the castle's loss.

James FitzThomas FitzGerald appointed Thomas Oge Fitzgerald as the Constable and moved his personal correspondence to be stored at the castle. Oge, who had been loyal to Desmond, subsequently surrendered the castle to the English Lord President of Munster, George Carew, 1st Earl of Totnes, in November 1600. Sir Charles Wilmot was appointed Constable for the Crown.

=== Seventeenth century ===
In 1620 the records of the Privy Council of Ireland noted that the bridge at Castle Maine was still in need of repair, having suffered from successive sieges. When the Irish Rebellion of 1641 broke out, Patrick Fitzmaurice, 19th Baron Kerry was directed to appoint Thomas Spring (the second son the earlier constable) as Constable. Soon afterwards, the castle was attacked by Daniel McCarthy of the Irish Catholic Confederates and taken after a few days siege, along with some stores and two obsolete cannon. The castle was held by the Irish Confederates until 1649, when it was surrendered to David Crosbie acting on behalf of Murrough O'Brien, 1st Earl of Inchiquin. The castle was demolished shortly thereafter, in 1652, after it fell to New Model Army troops under the command of Edmund Ludlow.

Despite the destruction of the castle, Constables (with a salary of 2s 3d per day), continued to be appointed as an office of sinecure until 1828.

== Constables of Castle Maine ==
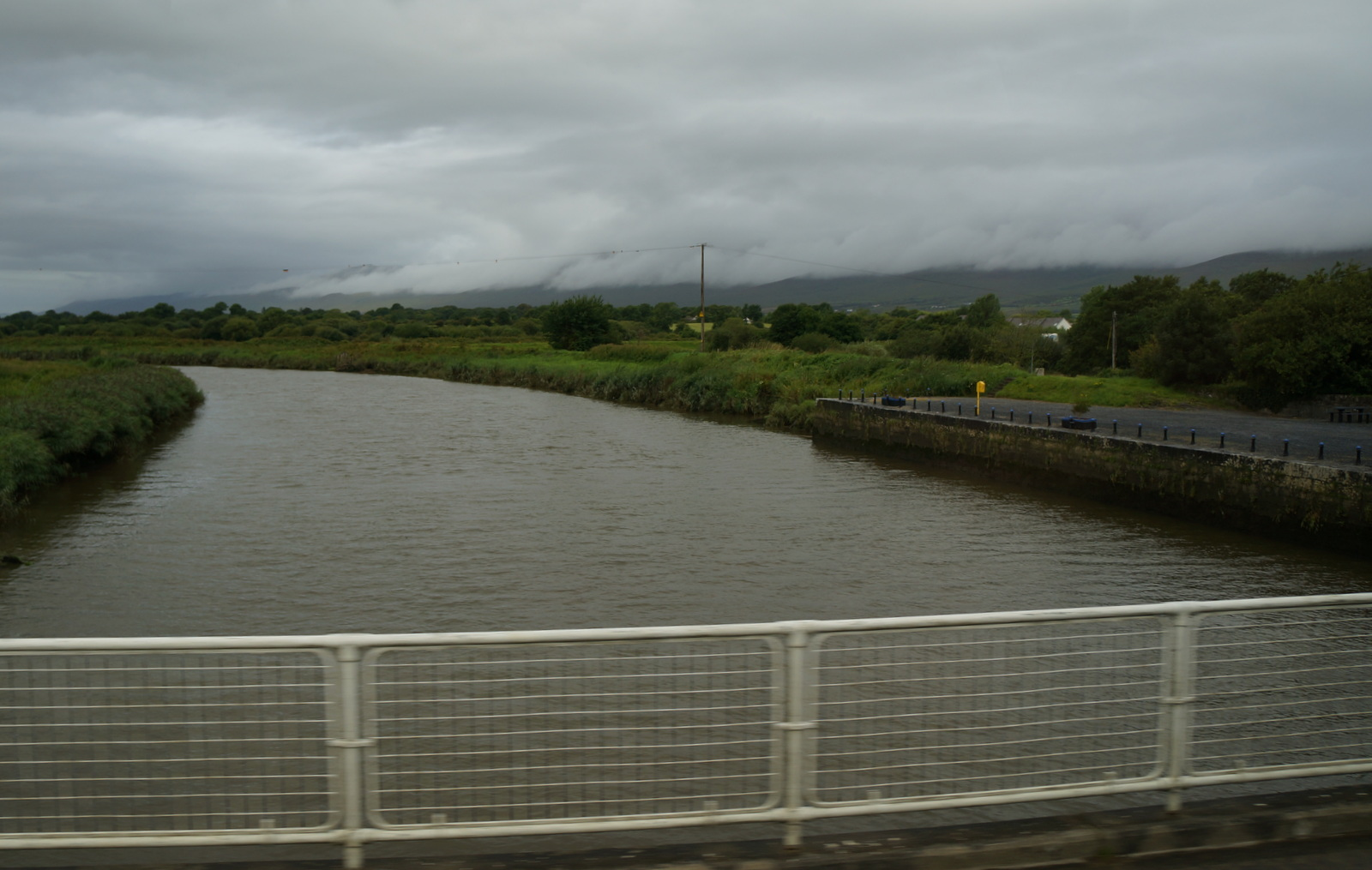
The River Maine from the site where the castle stood until its demolition in 1652

The Constables of Castle Maine were appointed by the English Crown between 1572 and 1828 to command the castle's small garrison and maintain English authority over the locality. Constables were permitted to hold two fairs and were granted rights to fisheries on the River Maine and in Castlemaine Harbour as a source of income additional to their salary. In 1788 the appointment is recorded as having been worth £300 per year in income.

- John Herbert: 1572–1573

Andrew Herbert (Vice-Constable): 1573

- Captain William Apsley: 1574–1579
- Andrew Martyn: 1579–1580
- Captain Cheston: 1580–1583

Edward Spring (Vice-Constable): 1583

- John Savage: 1583–1584
- Captain Thomas Spring: 1584–1597
- Sir Warham St Leger: 1597–1599

Sir Edward Denny (Vice-Constable): 1597

- Thomas Oge Fitzgerald of Ardnagragh: 1599–1600
- Charles Wilmot, 1st Viscount Wilmot: 1601–1608
- Thomas Roper, 1st Viscount Baltinglass: 1608–1638
- Sir Edward Denny: 1638–1641
- Thomas Spring: 1641
- Vacant: 1641–1691
- Sir Richard Cox, 1st Baronet: 1691–1733
- Charles Bodens: ?–1762–?
- Major William Botet: ?–1810
- Colonel James Cuffe: 1810–1828
