= Thomas Spring of Castlemaine =

English Protestant soldier and landowner

Thomas Spring of Castlemaine (died 1597) was an English Protestant soldier, politician and Constable of Castle Maine in County Kerry, Ireland.

== Biography ==
Thomas Spring was born in Lavenham, Suffolk, the son of Robert Spring. He was the grandson of Thomas Spring of Lavenham, the richest merchant in England during the early 1500s.

Spring was an officer in the army of Elizabeth I during the Tudor conquest of Ireland. He served with distinction, coming to the attention of Walter Raleigh who lobbied Sir Michael Hicks for a reward for Spring. As part of the Plantation of Munster he was granted over 3,000 acres of land in County Kerry in 1578. In 1584, he was appointed Constable of Castle Maine, with responsibility for maintaining English royal authority over the locality. He was accorded the right to hold several country fairs as a source of income and was in control of collecting tolls and taxes for the Crown. His land increased to approximately 6,000 acres when, on 12 December 1588, he was granted the estates of Killagha Abbey, which had been seized by The Crown during the dissolution of the monasteries. Spring was instructed to rebuild the abbey in a castle-like manner, so that it could serve as a defensive structure.

From 1585 to 1586 Spring was the Member of Parliament for County Kerry in the Irish House of Commons and he served as High Sheriff of Kerry in 1592. He was the first of the Spring family to settle in Ireland.

Spring married Annabelle Browne, the daughter of John Browne, Master of Awney, Co.Limerick, with whom he had two sons and five daughters. His eldest son, Thomas, was a practising lawyer. His younger son, Walter, served as High Sheriff of Kerry in 1609. Walter's grandson was Walter Spring, who lost much of the family's Irish estate during the Irish Confederate Wars. Of Thomas's daughters, Alice married Colonel James Ryves, elder brother of Sir William Ryves and Sir Thomas Ryves.

== Ancestry ==
Ancestors of Thomas Spring of Castlemaine

16. Sir Thomas Spring
8. Thomas Spring of Lavenham
17. Margaret Appleton
4. Robert Spring
18. Sir Thomas Appleton
9. Alice Appleton
19. Margary Crane
2. Thomas Spring
20. Thomas Eden
10. Henry Eden
21. Agnes Brett
5. Anne Eden
22. John Olney
11. Mary Olney
1. Thomas Spring of Castlemaine, High Sheriff of Kerry
24. John Fairey
12. Henry Fairey
6. John Fairey
3. Julian Fairey
28. Richard Boteler
14. William Boteler
29. Grace Kirton
7. Mary Boteler
15. Elizabeth Basfurd

Parliament of Ireland
Unknown	Member of Parliament for County Kerry; 1585–1586; With: John Fitzgerald	Succeeded by Daniel O'Sullivan Beare; Stephen Rice
