= Edward Denny (1605–1646) =

Anglo-Irish politician (1605–1646)

Sir Edward Denny (1605 – 1646) was an Anglo-Irish politician.

== Biography ==
Denny was the son of Sir Arthur Denny (1584–1619) and Elizabeth Forest. He was High Sheriff of Kerry in 1634 and Member of Parliament for County Kerry in the Irish House of Commons from 1639 until his death. Between 1638 and 1641 he was Constable of Castle Maine. In the Irish Rebellion of 1641, his seat at Tralee Castle was attacked and burnt by Irish rebels.

He married Ruth Roper, daughter of Thomas Roper, 1st Viscount Baltinglass. He was succeeded in his estate by his son, Arthur Denny.

Parliament of Ireland
Preceded by Walter Crosbie; Sir Valentine Browne, Bt	Member of Parliament for County Kerry; 1639–1646; With: Sir Valentine Browne, Bt (1639–1640); Maurice Fitzgerald (1640–1646)	Succeeded by Hardress Waller; Henry Ingoldsby
