= John Ernley =

British justice

Sir John Ernley (or Ernle; 1464 – 22 April 1520) was an English justice. He was educated at one of the Inns of Chancery from 1478 to 1480 before being admitted to Gray's Inn. By 1490 he was a particularly conspicuous member of the "Sussex circle" gathered around Edmund Dudley. In his home county of Sussex he maintained a substantial legal practice, serving as feoffee, arbitrator, justice and commissioner, and joining the home assize circuit in 1496 and 1497 as an associate, followed by a position on the county bench in 1498. In the 16th century, he acted as a feoffee for Edmund Dudley, and was appointed Attorney General for England and Wales on 12 July 1507 as a result of his influence with Dudley and, as an extension, Henry VII. He was reappointed when Henry VIII came to power and under him became an important figure in the court. After Sir Robert Rede died in 1519, Ernley was selected to replace him as Lord Chief Justice of the Court of Commons Pleas, and was appointed on 27 January of that year. He served for barely a year, dying on 22 April 1520, and was buried in Sidlesham, near Chichester. He left a son and heir, William Erneley, who also served as a Member of Parliament. William married Bridget Spring the only daughter of wealthy Thomas and Alice Spring, clothiers of Laverham.

Legal offices
Preceded by Sir Robert Rede	Chief Justice of the Common Pleas; 1519–1520	Succeeded by Sir Robert Brudenell
Preceded by James Hobart	Attorney General for England and Wales; 1509–1518	Succeeded by Sir John FitzJames
