= Robert Rede =

English Chief Justice of the Common Pleas

Sir Robert Rede KS (died 7 or 8 January 1519) was an English Chief Justice of the Common Pleas.

== Biography ==
Rede was the son of William Rede of Wrangle, Lincolnshire, a Calais merchant, and his wife Joan. He was admitted to Lincoln's Inn in 1467, (although he may have previously been a member of Clement's Inn) and gave his first reading there in 1481. In 1486 he was made a Serjeant-at-law, followed by a promotion in 1494 to King's Serjeant, and an appointment in 1495 as a justice of the Court of King's Bench, where he sat for 10 years under Sir John Fineux, and was knighted for his services in 1501. He was transferred to the Court of Common Pleas in 1506 and promoted to Chief Justice, a position he held until his death. Rede also served as one of the executors of King Henry VII's will.

Rede married the daughter of John Alfegh (or Alphay), a fellow member of Lincoln's Inn, and under the terms of his marriage settlement acquired lands in Hoo. Alfegh had built Bore Place in Chiddingstone, Kent, and this property later came to Rede and his wife in 1489 under the terms of Alfegh's will.

Rede died on 7 or 8 January 1519. He left a £4 annual stipend to finance three lectureships at Jesus College, Cambridge, one for logic, one for moral philosophy and one for the humanities. Although these positions had been provided since 1480, the stipend helped secure the position. From 1858 the fund was used to support a single annual lecture, known as the Rede Lecture, a practice that has continued to this day.

== Marriage and issue ==
In the 1470s Rede married Margaret Alfegh, daughter of John Alphegh, by whom he had two sons and five daughters:

- Edmund Rede (d.1501), who predeceased his father.
- John Rede, who became a member of the Inner Temple, and predeceased his father.
- Mary Rede, who married Sir William Barantyne.
- Jane Rede, who married John Caryll (d.1523), Serjeant-at-law.
- Bridget Rede (d.1558), who married Thomas Willoughby (d.1545) (the son of Sir Christopher Willoughby, de jure 10th Baron Willoughby de Eresby) of Lincoln's Inn, Justice of the Common Pleas. She inherited Bore Place under her father's will. Bridget married secondly Anthony Knyvett.
- Dorothy Rede, who married Sir Edward Wotton (d.1551) of Lincoln's Inn. She inherited a house in St. Sepulchre's, London, under her father's will.
- Elizabeth Rede, a nun at West Malling, Kent.

== Notes ==
Legal offices
Preceded by Sir Thomas Frowyk	Chief Justice of the Common Pleas; 1506–1519	Succeeded by Sir John Ernley
