= Cloth merchant =

One who sells cloth

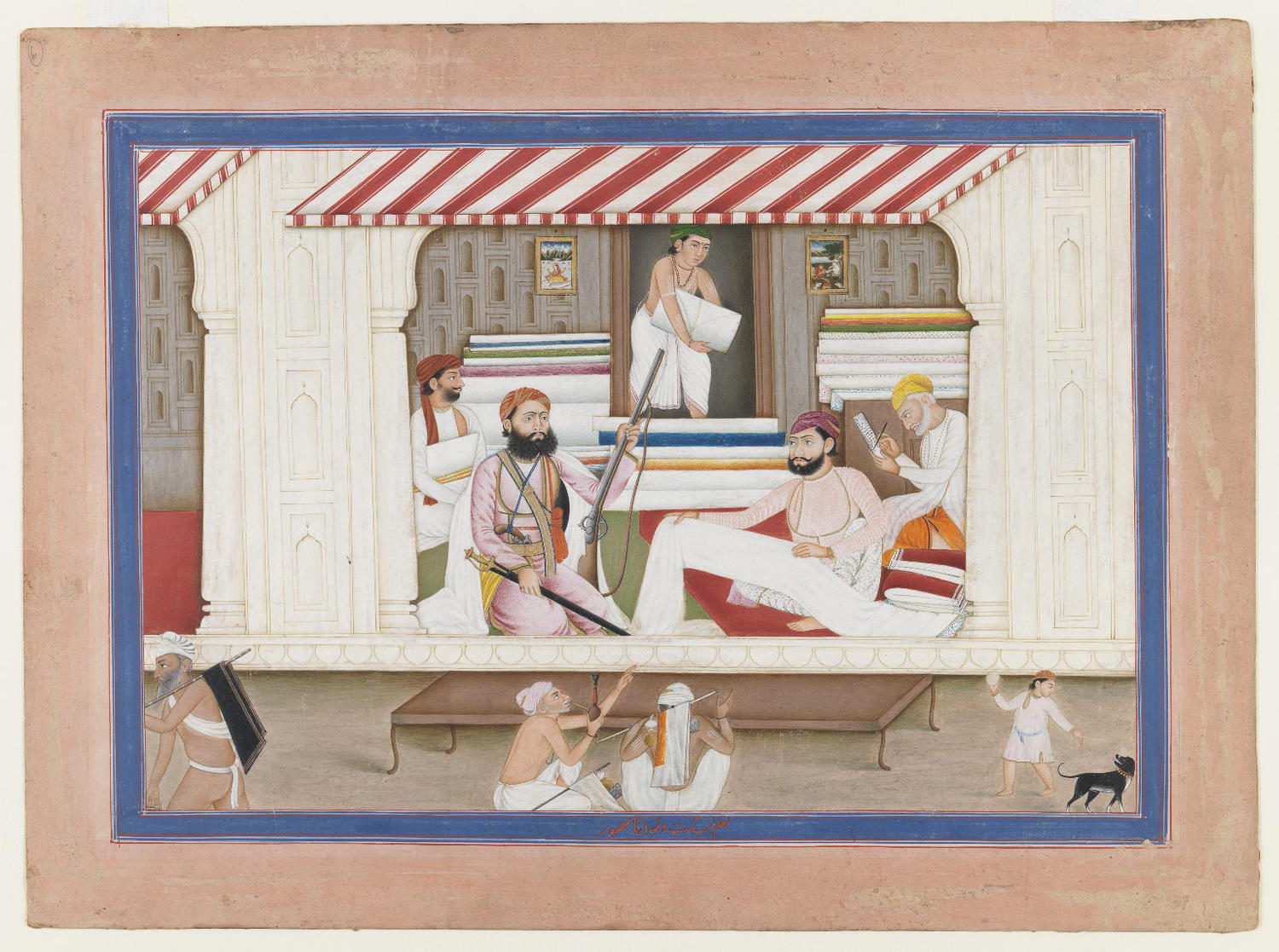
Cloth Merchant's Shop, Brooklyn Museum, depicts an establishment in India.

In the Middle Ages or 16th and 17th centuries, a cloth merchant was one who owned or ran a cloth (often wool) manufacturing or wholesale import or export business. A cloth merchant might additionally own a number of draper's shops. Cloth was extremely expensive and cloth merchants were often very wealthy. A number of Europe's leading banking dynasties such as Medici and Berenberg built their original fortunes as cloth merchants.

In England, cloth merchants might be members of one of the important trade guilds, such as the Worshipful Company of Drapers.

Alternative names are clothier, which tended to refer more to someone engaged in production and the sale of cloth, whereas a cloth merchant would be more concerned with distribution, including overseas trade, or haberdasher, who were merchants in sewn and fine fabrics (e.g. silk) and in London, members of the Haberdashers' Company.

The largely obsolete term merchant taylor also describes a business person who trades in textiles, and initially a tailor who keeps and sells materials for the garments which he makes. In England, the term is best known in the context of the Worshipful Company of Merchant Taylors, one of the livery companies of the City of London, nowadays a charitable institution best known for the Merchant Taylors' schools – the Company preserves the ancient spelling "taylor" in its name.

== Notable cloth merchants ==
- Alderman Robert Aske
- Sir William Gardiner
- Benjamin Henshawe, (1585–1631)
- Baptist Hicks, (1551–1629)
- Robert Jousie
- John Kendrick
- Henry Machyn, diarist
- Jack O'Newbury
- William Paterson
- Thomas Spring of Lavenham
- Sir Thomas White

== See also ==
- Clothing industry
- Textile industry
- Cloth hall
