= Valentine Browne, 3rd Viscount Kenmare =

Irish viscount (1695–1736)

Valentine Browne
- Viscount Kenmare
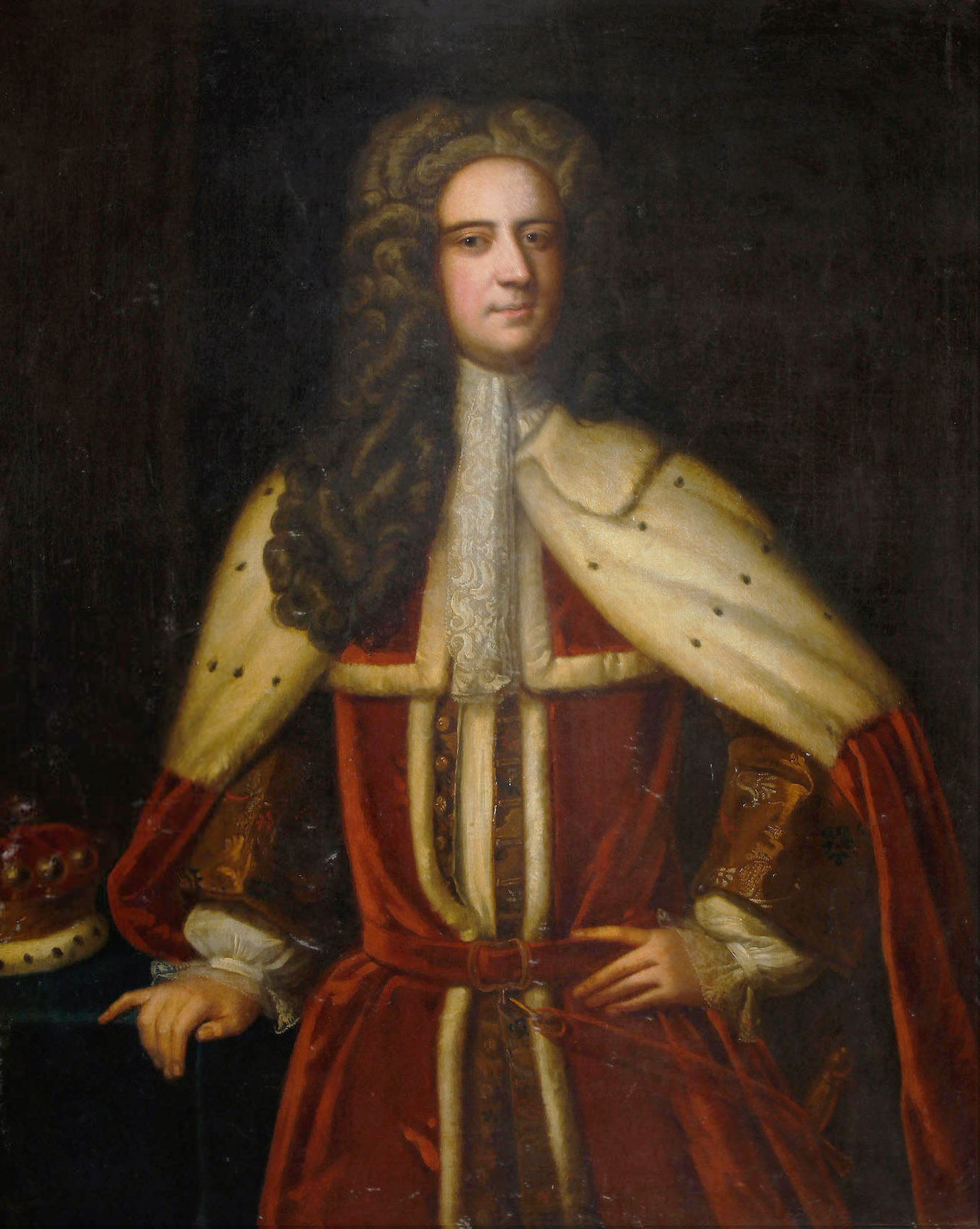
- Tenure: 1720–1736
- Predecessor: Valentine, 2nd Viscount
- Successor: Thomas, 4th Viscount
- Born: March 1695
- Died: 30 June 1736 (aged 41)
- Spouse: Honora Butler
- Issue Detail: Thomas & others
- Father: Valentine, 2nd Viscount
- Mother: Helen Browne

Sir Valentine Browne, 5th Baronet and 3rd Viscount Kenmare in the Jacobite Peerage (1695–1736) in Ireland.

== Birth and origins ==
Valentine was the son of Nicholas Browne and his wife, Helen Browne. His father was the 2nd Viscount Kenmare. His mother was his father's cousin, being the eldest daughter of Thomas Browne of Hospital, County Limerick.

Family tree

Valentine Browne with his two wives, his parents, and other selected relatives. (Note: This family tree is based on genealogies of the baronets, viscounts and earls Browne)

Valentine; 1st Viscount; 1638–1694	Jane; Plunkett
Nicholas; 2nd Viscount d. 1720	Helen; Browne
Honora; Butler	Valentine; 3rd Viscount; 1695–1736	Mary; FitzGerald
Thomas; 4th Viscount; 1726–1795	Anne; Cooke
Valentine; 1st Earl; 1754–1812	Charlotte; Dillon; 1755-1782

Legend

XXX	Subject of the article	XXX	Viscounts & Earls of Kenmare

== Early life ==
After the death of his father in 1720, he succeeded to the family estates which had been under the management of John Asgill because his grandfather Sir Valentine Browne was a supporter of the Jacobite cause who took part in the Battle of Aughrim. For this he was attainted and the family estates forfeited.

The inheritance to which he succeeded was deep in debt due to mismanagement by Asgill. The difficulty experienced in meeting the heavy encumbrances on the impoverished estate fostered disputes in the family and drove close relatives into law with each other, much of which was both protracted and costly.

The exact status of Browne as either a Baronet or Viscount is disputable. He was unambiguously a baronet. The Viscountcy of Kenmare was created by James II in the Peerage of Ireland after his deposition as King of England, but before his deposition from the Irish throne. The peerage may be regarded as legitimate beyond Jacobites, but the Protestant establishment of the day did not recognise it.

== First marriage and children ==
Valentine Browne married, firstly, Honora Butler, daughter of Colonel Thomas Butler and his wife Margaret Bourke, in November 1720. Egan O'Rahilly wrote an Irish poem, called the epithalamium, for the wedding.

Valentine and Honora had a son:

- Thomas

Honora Butler died of smallpox in 1730.

== Second marriage and children ==
He married, secondly, Mary FitzGerald, daughter of Sir Maurice FitzGerald, in October 1735.

Valentine and Mary had a daughter.

== Late life and death ==
It is possible that his financial difficulties caused him to refuse the requests of the poet Egan O'Rahilly to restore his land to him. This refusal caused O'Rahilly to compose a bitter and mournful poem called "Valentin Brown" in which he launches a vitriolic attack on the viscount.

In later years, however, the estate gained a sound financial position after portions of it were sold. Sir Valentine died on 30 June 1736, aged 41.

== Poem ==
Egan O'Rahilly's poem "Valentin Brown", translated by Frank O'Connor, reads:

That my old bitter heart was pierced in this black doom,
That foreign devils have made our land a tomb,
That the sun that was Munster's glory has gone down
Has made me a beggar before you, Valentine Brown

That royal Cashel is bare of house and guest,
That Brian's turreted home is the otter's nest,
That the kings of the land have neither land nor crown
Has made me a beggar before you, Valentine Brown.

Garnish away in the west with its master banned,
Hamburg the refuge of him who has lost his land,
An old grey eye, weeping for lost renown,
Have made me a beggar before you, Valentine Brown.

== Notes and references ==
=== Sources ===
- Cokayne, George Edward (1887). Complete Peerage of England, Scotland, Ireland, Great Britain and the United Kingdom, Extant, Extinct, or Dormant. Vol. I (1st ed.). London: George Bell and Sons. – A to Bo
- Cokayne, George Edward (1900). Complete Baronetage, 1611 to 1800. Vol. I (1st ed.). Exeter: William Pollard & Co. OCLC 866278985. – 1611 to 1625
- Dinneen, Patrick S. (1909). The Poems of Egan O'Rahilly. Vol. III (2nd ed.). London: David Nutt. OCLC 1157129500.
- Lodge, John (1789). Archdall, Mervyn (ed.). The Peerage of Ireland or, A Genealogical History of the Present Nobility of that Kingdom. Vol. VII. Dublin: James Moore. OCLC 264906028. – Barons
- Ruvigny, Melville Henry, Marquis de (1904). Jacobite Peerage Baronetage Knightage and Grants of Honour. Edinburgh: T C & E C Jack. OCLC 655825906.

Peerage of Ireland
Preceded by Nicholas Browne	Viscount Kenmare; 1720–1736	Succeeded by Valentine Browne
Baronetage of Ireland
Preceded by Nicholas Browne	Baronet of Molahiffe; 1720–1736	Succeeded by Thomas Browne
