= John Boyle (bishop) =

English bishop of the Church of Ireland

John Boyle (1563?–1620) was an English Protestant bishop in Ireland.

== Life ==
He was born in Kent about 1563, the son of Roger Boyle and Joan Naylor, and the elder brother of Richard Boyle, 1st Earl of Cork. John Boyle obtained the degree of D.D. at Oxford, and became Rector of Elstree sometime between 1598 and 1611.

He was collated prebendary of Lichfield on 5 February 1611. Through the interest and pecuniary assistance of his brother the Earl of Cork, and other relatives, he was, in 1617 appointed Bishop of Cork, Cloyne and Ross, the consecration taking place in 1618.

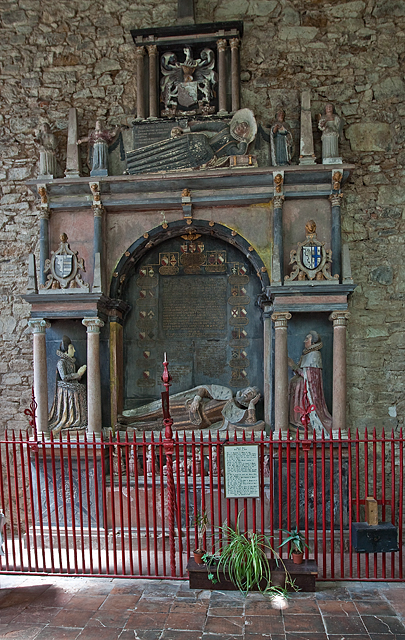
Tomb in St Mary's Collegiate church, Youghal

He died at Cork on 10 July 1620, and is laid to rest with his brother Richard in an impressive tomb in St Mary's Collegiate Church at Youghal. There is also a memorial to his parents in Preston church.

He left a daughter, Barbara, who married firstly Sir John Browne of Hospital, County Limerick, who was killed in a duel, and secondly Colonel John FitzGerald. By her first husband, she had two children, Thomas and Elizabeth. Thomas died within issue. Elizabeth married her cousin Thomas Browne, younger son of Sir Valentine Browne, 1st Baronet.
