= Nicholas Browne, 2nd Viscount Kenmare =

Irish Jacobite politician and soldier

Nicholas Browne, 2nd Viscount Kenmare (c.1660 – 1720) was an Irish Jacobite politician and soldier.

== Early life and family ==
Browne was the son of Sir Valentine Browne, Bt and Jane Plunkett, the heiress of Sir Nicholas Plunkett. Browne married his cousin, Helen Browne, on 23 March 1684. Through this marriage, he inherited a considerable estate from his father-in-law, Thomas Browne of Hospital. In 1687, Browne served as High Sheriff of County Cork. Browne's father was created Viscount Kenmare in the Peerage of Ireland on 20 May 1689 by James II, after his deposition by the English Parliament, but while he still possessed his rights as King of Ireland.

== Williamite War in Ireland ==
In 1689, Browne was elected as a Member of Parliament for County Kerry in the short-lived Patriot Parliament summoned by James II. Browne raised a regiment, of which he was colonel, in support of the Jacobite cause during the Williamite War in Ireland. He served under the Franco-Jacobite commander, the Marquis de Boisseleau, during the early part of the war. In March 1690 Browne and his regiment were garrisoned in Cork and participated as defenders in the Siege of Cork. A request for the regiment to pass into French service under Justin McCarthy, Viscount Mountcashel was rejected by James II. Following the Jacobite defeat, in 1691 Browne was attainted alongside his father, forfeiting his estate for life.

== Exile ==
Browne left Ireland for exile in 1691, living first in Ghent and then in Brussels. In 1694 his father died, and Browne inherited his viscountcy and baronetcy, although Browne's claim on these titles was not recognised outside Jacobite circles owing to the timing of its creation and the act of attainder. From exile, Browne corresponded regularly with his son, Valentine Browne, and associates in Ireland, attempting to secure the seized family estates for Valentine. He died in Brussels in 1720 and was interred in the Church of St Nicholas in the city.

Parliament of Ireland
Preceded by John Blennerhassett; Arthur Denny	Member of Parliament for County Kerry; 1689; With: Thomas Crosbie	Succeeded by Edward Denny; Thomas FitzMaurice
Peerage of Ireland
Preceded by Valentine Browne	Viscount Kenmare; Disputed; 1694–1720	Succeeded by Valentine Browne
Baronetage of Ireland
Preceded by Valentine Browne	Baronet of Molahiffe; 1694–1720	Succeeded by Valentine Browne
