= William Erneley =

16th-century English politician

William Erneley otherwise Ernley or Ernle (21 December 1501 – 20 January 1546), of Cakeham, near West Wittering, Sussex, was an English lawyer and politician.

Erneley was the son and heir of Sir John Ernley, Lord Chief Justice of the Court of Common Pleas (d. 1520), and belonged to the original Sussex line of an ancient landed family, Ernle, long seated at Earnley, Sussex. He was admitted to Gray's Inn in 1521.

In 1525, Erneley was appointed a justice of the peace for Sussex. In 1538, he is recorded as participating in the demolition of the shrine of Richard of Chichester on the orders of Thomas Cromwell. In 1542, he was elected as a Member of Parliament for Chichester. He possibly also represented the seat in the parliament summoned in 1545, but the records of the election have been lost.

In c.1522, he married Bridget Spring, the only daughter of Alice (born Appleton) and Thomas Spring of Lavenham. They had two sons and two daughters. In 1523, Bridget inherited a considerable fortune from the estate of her father.

Parliament of England
| Preceded by Unknown | Member of Parliament for Chichester; 1542–1546? With: Unknown | Succeeded by Unknown |
