= Thomas Browne, 4th Viscount Kenmare =

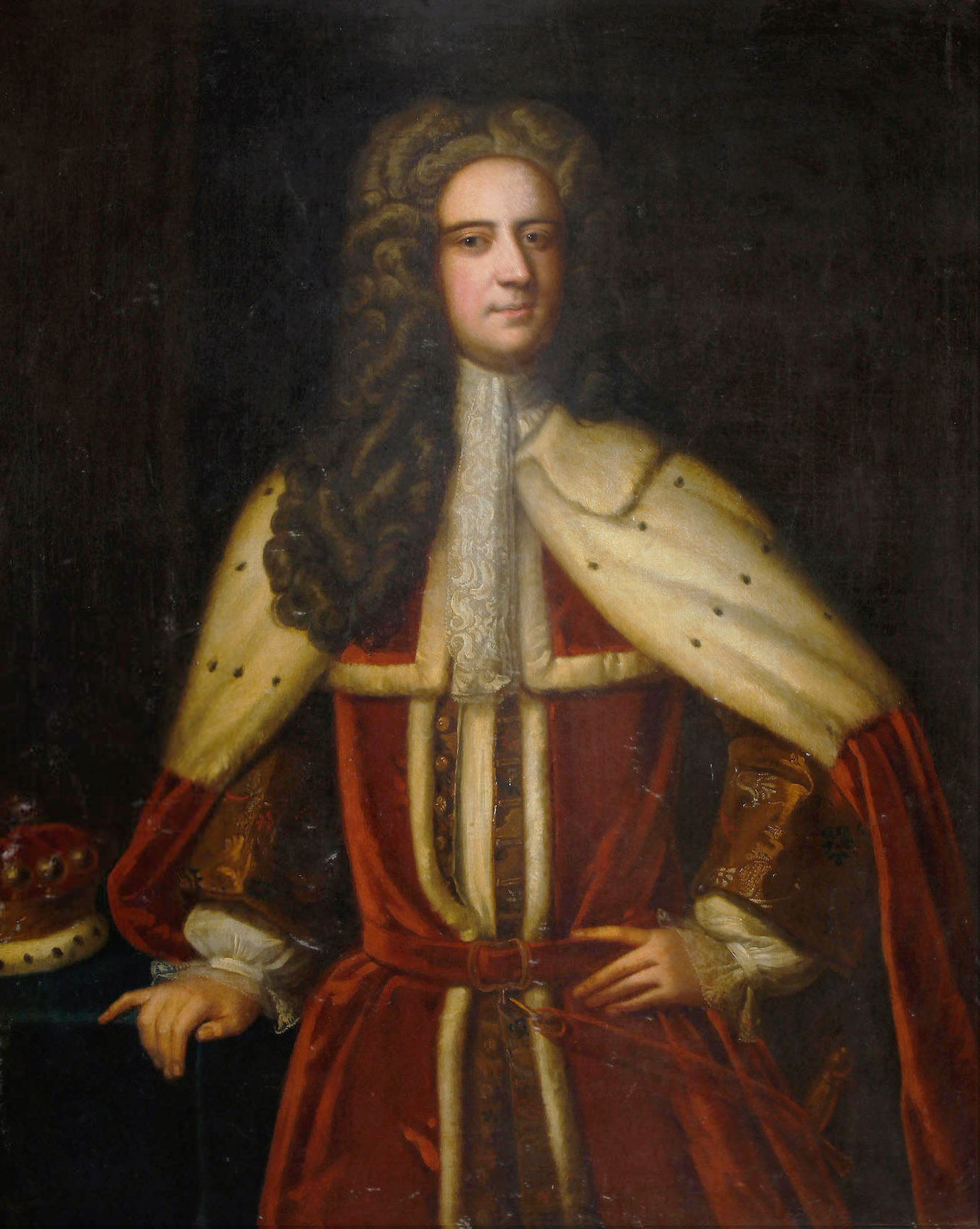
Father of Thomas Browne. The 3rd Viscount Kenmare, Valentine Browne by Kneller

Thomas Browne, 6th Baronet & 4th Viscount Kenmare (April 1726 – 11 September 1795) was an Irish landowner and politician.

== Family ==
Thomas Browne's father, Valentine Browne (1695–1736), 5th Baronet and 3rd Viscount Kenmare, was one of the few remaining Roman Catholic landowners in Ireland. His first wife, Honora Butler (?-1730) gave birth to four children, the second of whom was Thomas. The 3rd Viscount built Kenmare House, in Killarney, County Kerry in 1726. This site would become the main residence of the Browne family for the next three centuries. Thomas Browne inherited the estate and the house upon the death of his father in 1736 but did not make the site his permanent place of residence until the mid-1750s. In 1750, he married Anne Cooke, daughter of Thomas Cooke of Painstown, County Carlow. The pair had two children; Valentine (b.1754) and Katherine(?). The family resided in Dublin between December 1753 and July 1754 but settled in Killarney following this brief absence.

The Brownes were forced to migrate again in 1761. The Kenmare Manuscripts cite the children's education, Lady Kenmare's health and "an indignity which some envious characters under the sanction of the penal laws...mediated against (him)" as possible reasons for this move. The 1760s saw them travel Europe, visiting London, Paris and Lille and returning to Killarney periodically throughout the decade. By 1788, Thomas Browne was in residence in Kenmare House once more.

== Education ==
Browne attended Westminster School until the death of his father in 1736. His older brother, Valentine, died in 1728 leaving the ten-year-old Thomas to inherit the title of Viscount and an estate of over 120,000 acres that stretched across counties Kerry, Cork and Limerick. Browne was placed under the care of his aunt Katherine, wife of Don Louis da Cunha, Portuguese ambassador in London. She enrolled him in the English seminary at Douai in 1736. He spent four years studying here before moving on to enrol at Oxford. There were many attempts to convert him to the Church of England faith throughout his studies. His refusal to accept Protestantism cost him university matriculation at Oxford and a place in the English House of Commons. He finished his studies at the Academy of Turin and earned the respect of the King and the royal family of Sardinia.

== Politics ==
=== The Viscount Kenmare Title ===
The title Viscount Kenmare was granted to the Browne family by James II in March 1689. This was an Irish peerage created after the removal of James II from the English throne, while he was still de facto king of Ireland and prior to the conquest of William III. The first and second Viscounts fought for James II but were firm in their Catholicism and seem never to have been formally attainted under William. Consequently, the peerage remained on the Irish patent roll in a constitutionally ambiguous position, but was not formally recognised by the Protestant political establishment.

=== The 4th Viscount's Politics ===
Kenmare's aristocratic status and landownership naturally led him to play a prominent role in Catholic politics during the later eighteenth century. Kenmare sought to show that Roman Catholics could be incorporated in the Protestant settlement of eighteenth-century Ireland. In the early 1760s, he proposed unsuccessfully the establishment of an Irish regiment, with Catholic officers as well as other ranks, formally in Portuguese service but in practice supporting Britain's effort during the Seven Years' War. At the same time, Kenmare, and other heads of Catholic families, were suspected by some Protestants of organising the Whiteboy agrarian riots in Munster as part of a conspiracy to gain power in Ireland with French assistance. The desire of prominent Catholics to show that they did not wish forcibly to overthrow the constitutional settlement contributed to the development of the Catholic Committee, formed to argue for Catholic relief in Ireland. During the 1770s, with Arthur James Plunkett, seventh Earl of Fingall, and Anthony Preston, eleventh Viscount Gormanston, as well as a number of senior bishops, Kenmare formed a conservative party on the committee, arguing that Catholic relief was best obtained by producing declarations of loyalty and maintaining good relations with the Dublin and London administrations. This group became the dominant force on the committee.

Kenmare's correspondence with Edmund Burke shows that he maintained communication with the British parliamentary opposition, but he principally regarded the economic and constitutional reform championed by the Rockingham whigs and their Irish allies as a distraction that conflicted with his wish to maintain close ties with the government. To this end, he supported the recruitment of soldiers in Ireland to fight for Britain in the American War of Independence during the 1770s. His pro-government policy began to pay dividends when the first important Relief Acts were passed in 1778 and 1782, though other factors, including the development of Irish patriotism, the decline of Jacobitism, and the changing imperial context, were undoubtedly important as well.

The political ferment in Ireland following the recognition of legislative independence in 1782 threatened Kenmare's strategy. Demands for the widening of the parliamentary franchise among the volunteer and patriot movements raised the question of whether Catholics should be included in any measure of reform, but involvement in the campaign was opposed by Kenmare and the conservatives on the committee, which never actually discussed the issue. On 11 November 1783, at the start of a discussion on Catholic relief at the national convention of volunteers in Dublin, George Ogle, a Wexford MP, announced that he had received "a letter from a Roman Catholic peer expressive of the sentiments of the Catholics in general … that they had relinquished the idea of making any claims further than the religious liberties they enjoyed." Ogle's intervention stopped debate on Catholic claims. Though purportedly written by Kenmare, the letter was actually composed by his cousin, Sir Boyle Roche, who, as a Protestant, had represented Kenmare's views in the Commons. Kenmare could therefore deny authorship, ensuring that no break with the administration occurred, and that division in the committee was avoided.

=== Killarney ===
==== Improvements ====
Coming of age in 1747, Browne took over the Kenmare Estate and returned to Killarney. Upon arrival, he noted that the area was "a large barren waste" and professed an interest in improving the district. In his efforts to revitalise Killarney he drained the bogs, built and mended roads and houses, he planted trees and divided the land into sectioned fields. Tenants were given long leases and were offered cheap rent in exchange for improving their own dwelling places. Almost all the physical work involved in these projects was done by Browne's tenants. This work was considered charitable at the time as people earned a substantial wage by completing seemingly trivial jobs. Eager to improve the town, he also invested the profit earned at his salmon fisheries into public works. The town grew with time however, the circumstances of his tenants declined. He had invested around £30,000 in this venture and spent ten years living among them yet his efforts to help the people had not come to full fruition.

Despite this, Browne's legacy in Killarney is a lasting one, largely due to the fact that he was among the first to suggest Killarney as a tourist destination.

==== Tourism ====
Browne was quick to realise that the beauty of Killarney could be used to its advantage and began a campaign to promote Killarney as a tourist destination. His infrastructure enterprises included the building of inns and lodges that would be able to house visitors during the summer months. The people of Killarney were encouraged to embrace the spirit of tourism. Private tour services were set up whereby a local would act as a guide and usher visitors around the town and the lakes. The boats organised to sail the lakes would often stop at Inisfallen island where the 7th century Abbey had been transformed into a dining hall at the request of the Viscount Kenmare. Browne was aided by his family in this tourism venture. His sister travelled Europe and encouraged people to visit Killarney, lauding the town's beauty.

== Death and legacy ==
Lord Kenmare died in Killarney on 11 September 1795, and was succeeded by his son Valentine Browne (1754–1812), who maintained his father's political stance, and was created earl of Kenmare in 1801.

== See also ==
- Ireland 1691–1801

Baronetage of Ireland
Preceded by Valentine Browne	Baronet of Molahiffe; 1736–1795	Succeeded by Valentine Browne
