= Sir Valentine Browne, 2nd Baronet =

Irish baronet (died 1640)

Valentine Browne
- Browne Baronets of Molahiffe
- Tenure: 1633–1640
- Predecessor: Valentine, 1st Baronet
- Successor: Valentine, 1st Viscount Kenmare
- Died: 25 April 1640
- Spouse: Mary MacCarty
- Issue Detail: Valentine & others
- Father: Valentine, 1st Baronet
- Mother: Alice FitzGerald

Sir Valentine Browne, 2nd Baronet, of Molahiffe (died 1640), was an Irish landowner and MP.

== Birth and origins ==
Valentine was born about 1615. He was the eldest son of Sir Valentine Browne and his first wife, Alice FitzGerald. His father was the 1st Baronet Browne of Molahiffe, County Kerry. His mother was a daughter of Gerald FitzGerald, 14th Earl of Desmond, the rebel earl. His mother's family were the FitzGeralds of Desmond, a cadet branch of the Old English Geraldines, of which the FitzGeralds of Kildare were the senior branch.

Family tree

Valentine Browne with wife, parents, and other selected relatives. (Note: This family tree is based on genealogies of the baronets Browne and the viscounts Muskerry (later earls of Clancarty).)

Gerald; 14th Earl; Desmond c. 1533 – 1583; Rebel Earl	Nicholas; Browne d. 1606	Sheela; O'Sullivan; Beare	Charles; 1st Viscount; 1564–1641
Alice; FitzGerald	Valentine; 1st Bt. d. 1633	Julia; MacCarthy d. 1633
Valentine; 2nd Bt. c.1615 – 1640	Mary; MacCarthy
Valentine; 1st Viscount; 1638–1694	Jane; Plunkett
Nicholas; 2nd Viscount d. 1720	Helen; Browne

Legend

XXX	Subject of the article	XXX	Browne Baronets & Viscounts Kenmare	XXX	Viscounts; Muskerry
XXX	Earls of Desmond

== Baronet ==
On 7 September 1633 Browne succeeded his father as the 2nd Baronet Browne of Molahiffe.

== Parliament ==
When Charles I summoned the Irish Parliament of 1634–1635, Browne stood for County Kerry County and was elected. The Lord Deputy of Ireland, Thomas Wentworth (the future Lord Strafford) demanded taxes: six subsidies of £50,000 (equivalent to about £9,700,000 in 2025) were passed unanimously. The parliament also belatedly and incompletely ratified the Graces of 1628, in which the King had conceded rights for money.

== Marriage and children ==
Before 1638 Sir Valentine married Mary MacCarthy, the second daughter of Sir Charles (alias Cormac) MacCarthy, 1st Viscount Muskerry and his first wife Margaret O'Brien. She was a sister of his stepmother, his father's second wife.

Valentine and Mary had four children, two sons:

1. Valentine (1638–1694), 1st Viscount Kenmare
2. John of Ardagh (died 1706), married in 1672 Joan, daughter of Edmund Butler and sister of Pierce Butler, 6th Baron Cahir, but died childless.

—and two daughters:

1. Ellis, married John Tobin of Cumpshinagh, County Tipperary.
2. Eleanor, married a Mr. Power of Kilmeadon, County Waterford.

== Death and timeline ==
Sir Valentine died 25 April 1640 and was buried on 6 July 1640 at the church of Killarney. His son succeeded at the age of two and became a ward of his uncle Donough MacCarty, 2nd Viscount Muskerry.

Timeline
As his birth date is uncertain, so are all his ages.
Age	Date	Event
0	1615, about	Born
9–10	1625, 27 Mar	Accession of King Charles I, succeeding King James I
17–18	1633, 7 Sep	Succeeded as 2nd Baronet Browne of Molahiffe
18–19	1634, 11 Jun	Elected MP of the Parliament of 1634–1635 for County Kerry County
22–23	1638	Eldest son, Valentine, born
24–25	1640, 25 Apr	Died

== Notes and references ==
=== Sources ===
- Adams, Constance Louisa (1904). Castles of Ireland – Some Fortress Histories and Legends. London: Elliot Stock. OCLC 751487142. (for Ross Castle)
- Asch, Ronald G. (2004). "Wentworth, Thomas, first earl of Strafford (1593–1641)". In Matthew, Colin; Harrison, Brian (eds.). Oxford Dictionary of National Biography. Vol. 56. New York: Oxford University Press. pp. 142–157. ISBN 0-19-861408-X.
- Burke, Bernard (1866). A Genealogical History of the Dormant, Abeyant, Forfeited and Extinct Peerages of the British Empire (New ed.). London: Harrison. OCLC 11501348. (for Desmond)
- Burke, Bernard; Burke, Ashworth Peter (1915). A Genealogical and Heraldic History of the Peerage and Baronetage, the Privy Council, Knightage and Companionage (77th ed.). London: Harrison. OCLC 1155471554. – (for Kenmare)
- Cokayne, George Edward (1892). Complete Peerage of England, Scotland, Ireland, Great Britain and the United Kingdom, Extant, Extinct, or Dormant. Vol. IV (1st ed.). London: George Bell and Sons. OCLC 1180828941. – G to K (for Kenmare)
- Cokayne, George Edward (1896). Complete Peerage of England, Scotland, Ireland, Great Britain and the United Kingdom, Extant, Extinct, or Dormant. Vol. VII (1st ed.). London: George Bell and Sons. OCLC 1180891114. – S to T (for Strafford)
- Cokayne, George Edward (1900). Complete Baronetage, 1611 to 1800. Vol. I (1st ed.). Exeter: William Pollard & Co. OCLC 866278985. – 1611 to 1625 (for Browne)
- Cokayne, George Edward (1913). Gibbs, Vicary (ed.). The complete peerage of England, Scotland, Ireland, Great Britain and the United Kingdom, extant, extinct, or dormant. Vol. III (2nd ed.). London: St Catherine Press. OCLC 228661424. – Canonteign to Cutts (for Clancarty)
- Cusack, Mary Frances (1871). A Compendium of Irish History. Boston: Patrick Donahoe. OCLC 873009963.
- Fryde, Edmund Boleslaw; Greenway, D. E.; Porter, S.; Roy, I., eds. (1986). Handbook of British Chronology. Royal Historical Society Guides and Handbooks, No. 2 (3rd ed.). London: Offices of the Royal Historical Society. ISBN 0-86193-106-8. – (for timeline)
- Gillespie, Raymond (2006). Seventeenth-Century Ireland: Making Ireland Modern. Dublin: Gill & MacMillan. ISBN 978-0-7171-3946-0.
- House of Commons (1878). Return. Members of Parliament – Part II. Parliaments of Great Britain, 1705–1796. Parliaments of the United Kingdom, 1801–1874. Parliaments and Conventions of the Estates of Scotland, 1357–1707. Parliaments of Ireland, 1599–1800. London: His/Her Majesty's Stationery Office. OCLC 13112546.
- Kearney, Hugh Francis (1959). Strafford in Ireland 1633–1641 – a Study in Absolutism. Manchester: Manchester University Press. OCLC 857142293.
- Lodge, John (1789). Archdall, Mervyn (ed.). The Peerage of Ireland or, A Genealogical History of the Present Nobility of that Kingdom. Vol. VII. Dublin: James Moore. OCLC 264906028. – Barons (under Aylmer)
- McGrath, Brid (1997). "Valentine Browne (c.1615–1640), Kerry". A Biographical Dictionary of the Membership of the Irish House of Commons 1640 to 1641 (Ph.D.). Vol. 1. Dublin: Trinity College. pp. 83–84. – Parliaments & Biographies (PDF downloadable from given URL)
- Wedgwood, Cicely Veronica (1961). Thomas Wentworth, First Earl of Strafford 1593–1641. A Revaluation. London: Jonathan Cape. OCLC 1068569885.

Parliament of Ireland
Preceded by Daniel O'Sullivan; Stephen Rice	Member of Parliament for County Kerry County; 1634–1640; With: Sir Thomas Harris	Succeeded by Maurice FitzGerald; Sir Edward Denny
Baronetage of Ireland
Preceded by Valentine Browne	Baronet (of Molahiffe); 1633–1640	Succeeded by Valentine Browne
