= Thomas Spring of Lavenham =

English cloth merchant

Thomas Spring
- Arms granted during the reign of King Henry VIII (1509-1547) to "Thomas Spring of Lavenham": Argent, on a chevron between three mascles gules as many cinquefoils or
- Born: c. 1474
- Died: 1523 (aged 48–49)
- Burial place: Lavenham, Suffolk
- Occupation: Cloth merchant
- Spouses: Anne King (m. 1493): Alice Appleton
- Children: Sir John Spring; Robert Spring; Anne Spring; Rose Spring; Bridget Spring
- Parents: Thomas Spring; Margaret Appleton

Thomas Spring (c. 1474 – 1523) (alias Thomas Spring III or The Rich Clothier) of Lavenham in Suffolk, was an English cloth merchant. He consolidated his father's business to become one of the most successful in the booming wool trade of the period and was one of the richest men in England. He has been described as the most important figure of the early Tudor cloth industry.

== Origins ==
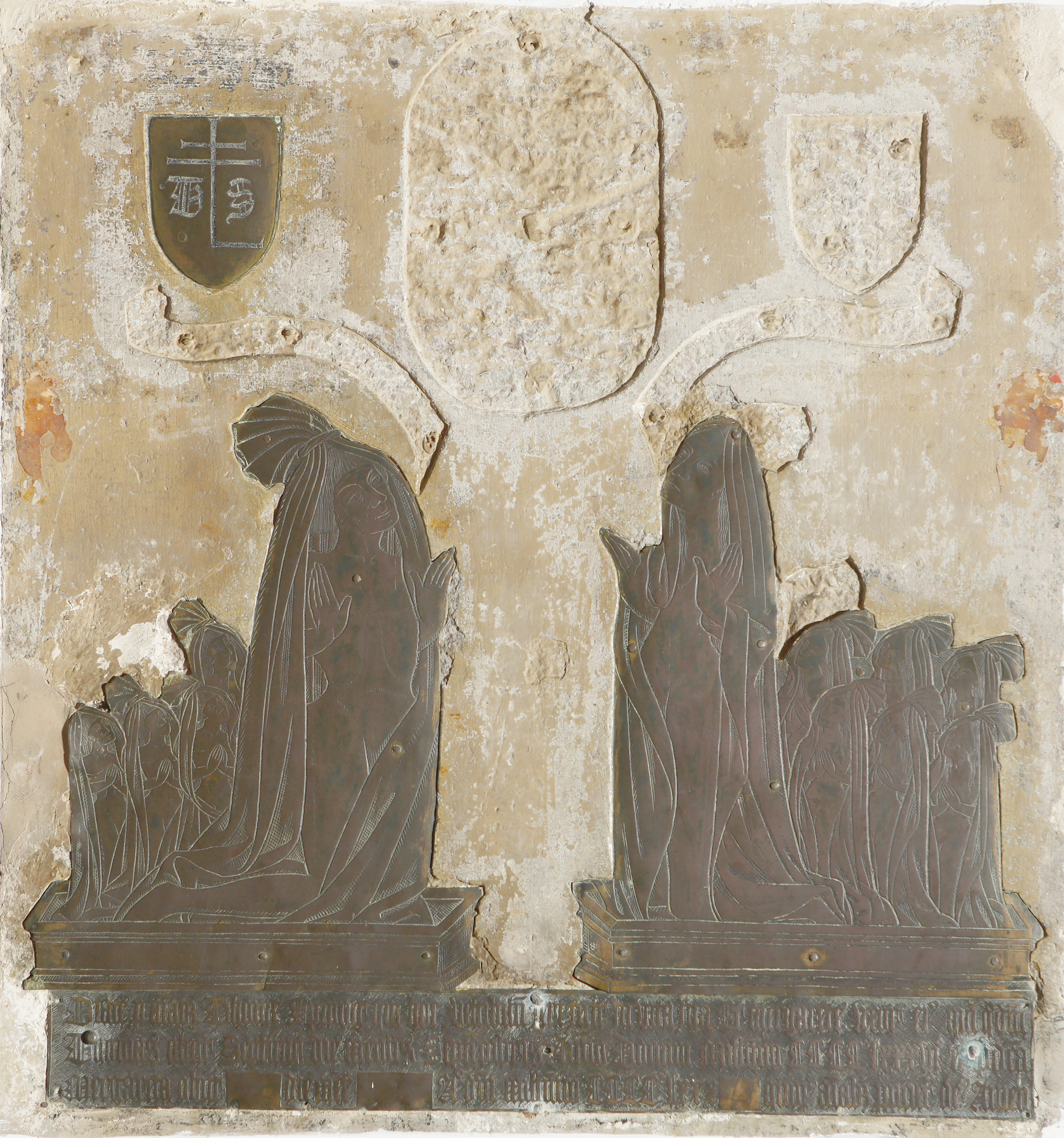
Monumental brass of Thomas II Spring (died 1486) and his wife Margaret Appleton, the parents of Thomas Spring (died 1523). Lavenham Church

Thomas Spring III was the eldest son and heir of Thomas Spring II (died 7 September 1486) of Lavenham (whose monumental brass survives in Lavenham Church), by his wife Margaret Appleton. His father's will mentions Thomas and two other sons, William and James (slain 1493), as well as a daughter, Marian. He had another brother, John Spring, whose daughter, Margaret Spring, married Aubrey de Vere, second son of John de Vere, 15th Earl of Oxford, and was the grandmother of Robert de Vere, 19th Earl of Oxford.

The will of Thomas Spring's grandfather, Thomas I Spring (died 1440), mentions his wife, Agnes, his eldest son and heir, Thomas (d. 7 September 1486), another son William, and two daughters, Katherine and Dionyse.

== Career ==
Merchant marks of Thomas Spring sculpted on the base of the tower of Lavenham Church

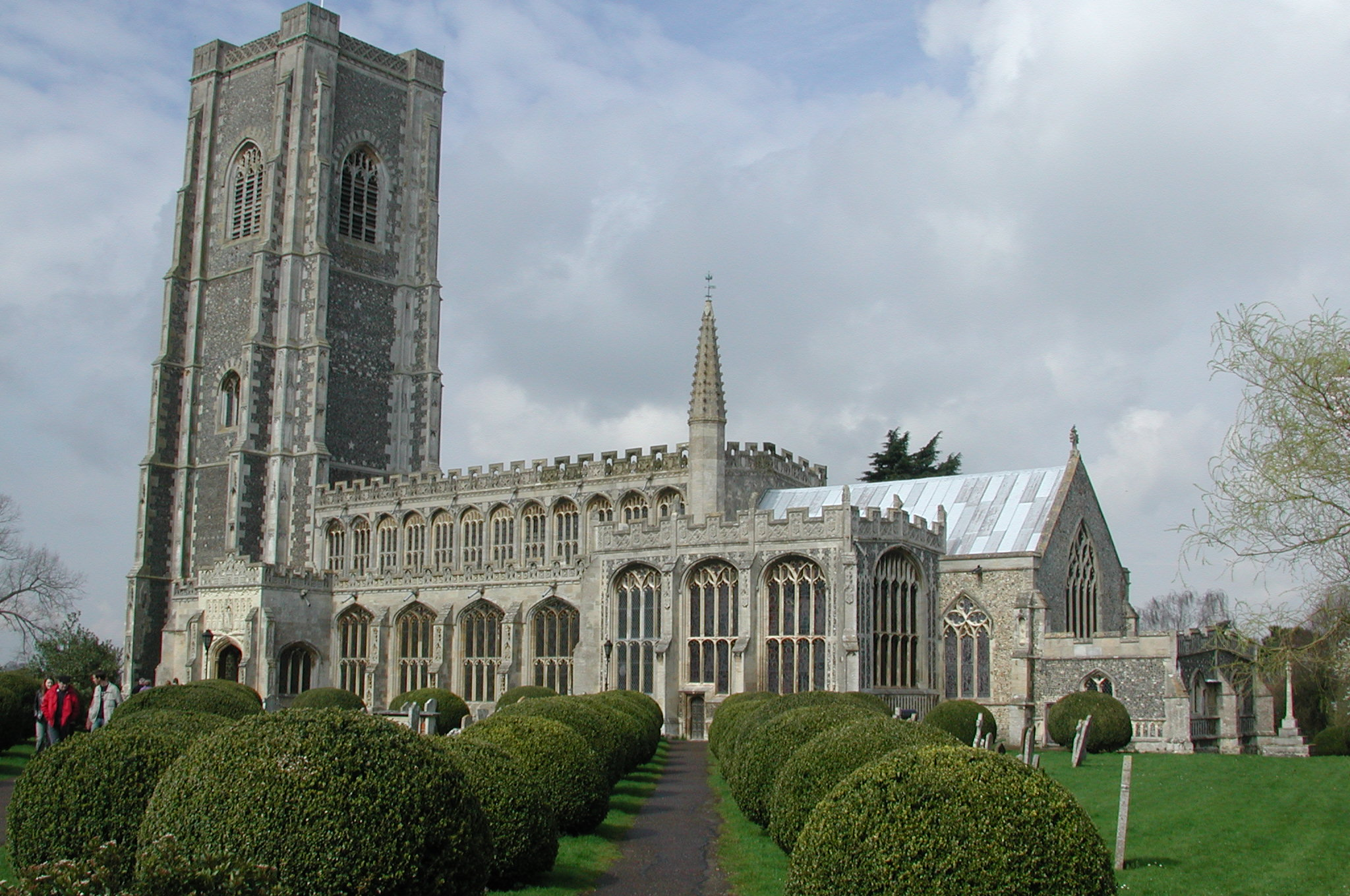
St Peter and St Paul's Church, Lavenham, partly financed by Thomas Spring and where he is buried

Spring inherited the family wool and cloth business from his father, and during his lifetime the cloth trade was at its most profitable. In 1502 he participated in identifying potential supporters of Edmund de la Pole, 3rd Duke of Suffolk, who was believed to be planning a rebellion against Henry VII. Spring was involved in trade through the ports of Essex and Suffolk to the Low Countries; in 1507, he was involved in a legal case for not paying duties on alum smuggled into England. In 1512, 1513 and 1517 his name appears as one of the commissioners for collecting taxation in Suffolk. In 1517 during the reign of Henry VIII, Spring was given exemption from public duties, possibly as a result of being suspected of underpaying tax, at which point he was probably at the height of his wealth.

By the time of his death, Spring was believed to be the richest man in England outside the peerage, having invested much of his money in land. He was by far the richest man in Suffolk, with lands worth upwards of £100 per annum. In 1522, he was estimated to own moveable goods of a total value of £1,800 and be owed debts in excess of £2,200. The preliminary survey for the Subsidy of 1523 shows Spring as lord of the manor of twenty-six manors in eastern England, and a landowner in over one hundred other manors. Spring is mentioned in John Skelton's satirical poem Why come ye not to Court, which makes reference to the rich clothier, with whom Skelton is said to have been friends, and his refusal to attend court:

"Now nothing, but pay pay with laughe and lay downe Borough, Citie and towne good Springe of Lanam must count what became of his clothe makyng. My Lordes grace will bryng down thys hye Springe and brynge it so lowe it shal not ever flow."

Like his father, Thomas Spring was closely involved in the reconstruction and embellishment of St Peter and St Paul's Church in Lavenham. This was partly done in order to propitiate John de Vere, 13th Earl of Oxford, who had ordered the reconstruction work and was the other principal donor. The rebuilding also gave Spring an opportunity to display his wealth and generosity, thus solidifying his position in Suffolk; a common motivation behind the construction of many similar wool churches.

== Marriage and issue ==
Thomas Spring married twice:

- Firstly, in 1493, to Anne King, of Boxford, Suffolk, by whom he had two sons and two daughters:
  - Sir John Spring (d. 12 August 1547), of Lavenham, eldest son and heir, who married Dorothy Waldegrave, a daughter of Sir William Waldegrave
  - Robert Spring (1502–1550), who left a will dated 10 October 1547 in which he mentions his wife Agnes, his eldest son and heir Thomas Spring of Castlemaine, six other sons (Jerome, Robert, John, Nicholas, Stephen and Henry, Parson of Icklingham), and two daughters Dorothy and Frances. As overseer, he appointed Sir William Cordell.
  - Anne Spring (1494–1528), who married Sir Thomas Jermyn (d.1552) of Rushbrooke in Suffolk. After her death, Jermyn married secondly to Anne Drury.
  - Rose Spring (b.1496), who married Thomas Guybon.
- Secondly he married a lady named Alice Appleton (died 1538), the widow of a man surnamed May, by whom he had a further daughter:
  - Bridget Spring (1498–c. 1557), who married firstly William Erneley (21 December 1501 – 20 January 1546), son of Sir John Erneley (c. 1464–1520), Chief Justice of the Common Pleas, by whom she had two sons and two daughters, and secondly to Sir Henry Hussey (d. 28 August 1557) of Slinfold in Sussex.

Alice survived him by fifteen years. In her will, dated 13 April 1538, she mentions her daughter by Thomas Spring, Bridget, now the wife of William Erneley; her daughter Alice, now the wife of Richard Fulmerston, gentleman; and her daughter Margaret (died c. 1552), the wife of William Risby (died c. 1551). She appoints as executors her daughter Margaret and sons-in-law, William Risby and Richard Fulmerston, and requests "my Lord of Oxenford" (John de Vere, 15th Earl of Oxford) to aid and defend my said executors." In a codicil added 31 August 1538, she discharges Richard Fulmerston as executor, and appoints him supervisor. Both will and codicil were proved 5 September 1538.

Alice Spring had been not just a beneficiary but also an executor of her husband's will. She is said to be the last notable "Spring of Laverham". She made the second largest donation to Suffolk's taxes in that year. Thomas, her second husband, had owned 25 East Anglian manors and Laverham had become the fourteenth richest English town. The family later moved to Pakenham but their descendants married well.

== Death and burial ==
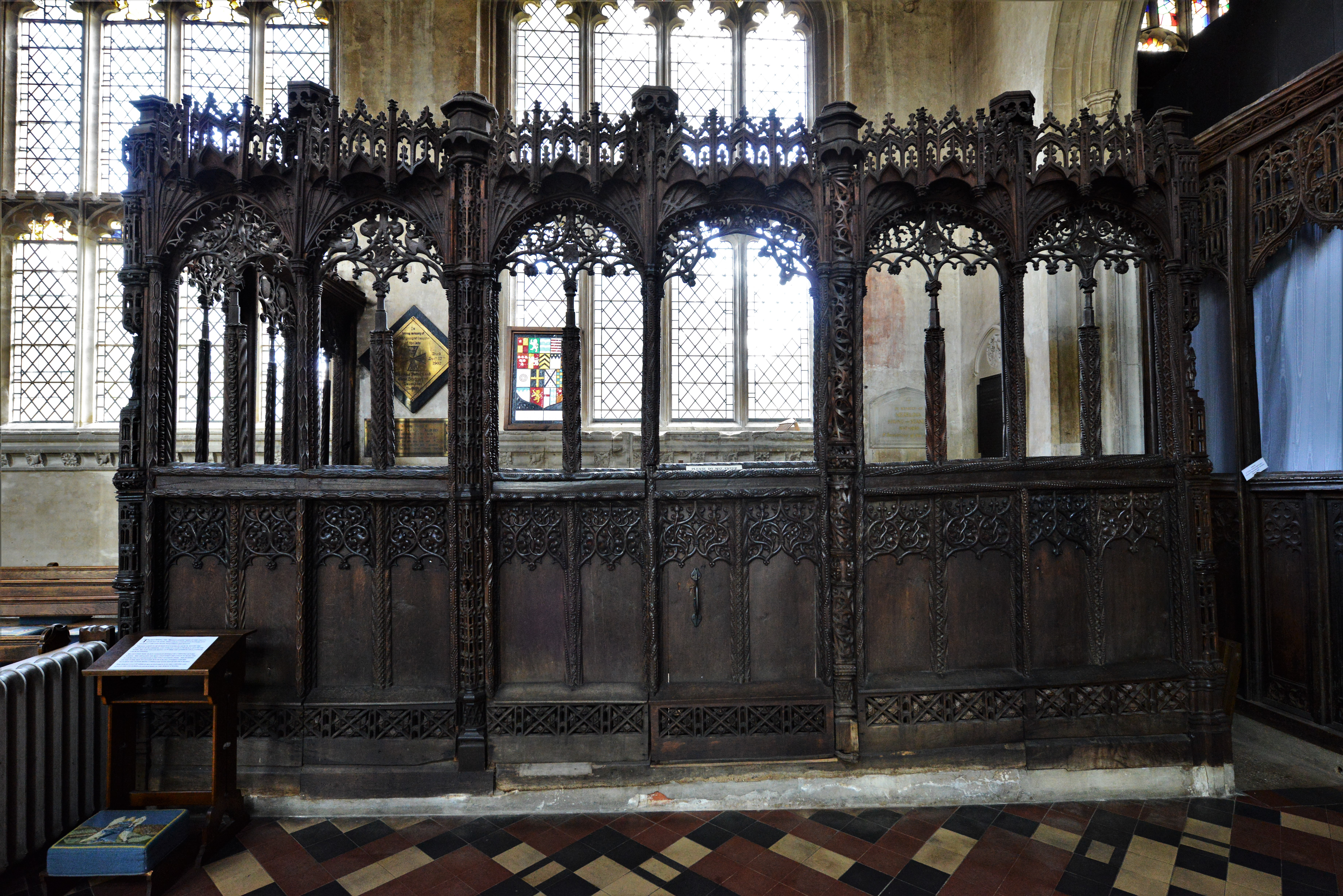
Parclose screen in Lavenham Church, erected as ordered by the will of Thomas Spring (d.1523)

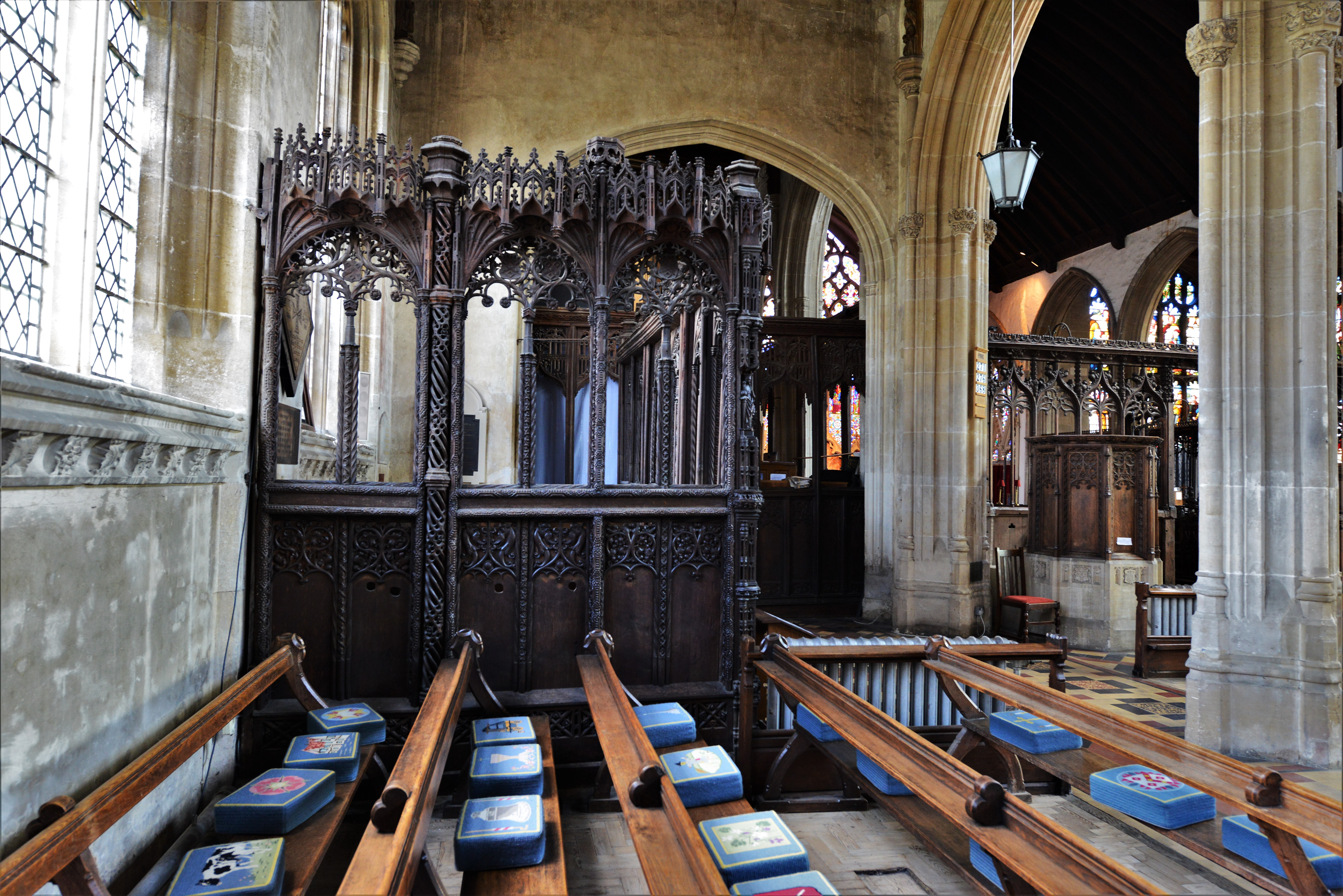
End view

Spring made his last will on 13 June 1523 as 'Thomas Spring of Lavenham, clothmaker', leaving to his wife Alice Spring all her apparel and jewels, 1,000 marks in money and half his plate and implements of household, with the other half to go to John his eldest son and heir. Spring also left bequests to his son Robert, to his unmarried daughter Bridget, to the children of his married daughter Rose Guybon and to the children of his son-in-law Thomas Jermyn. To 'my wife's daughter, Alice May', he bequeathed £26 13s 4d, 'which I recovered for her of May's executors', to be paid to her at the age of sixteen. A further sum of 5,000 marks was left in trust for future generations of Spring family members.

Thomas Spring was buried in the Church of Saint Peter and Saint Paul, Lavenham, before the altar of St Katherine, and his tomb was fenced in by the surviving elaborate wooden parclose screen which in his will he ordered his executors to erect. His widow, Alice, commissioned Flemish wood carvers to create a ten-foot high parclose screen around his tomb, which is one of the most intricate still in existence.

== See also ==
- Spring family
