= Valentine Browne, 1st Viscount Kenmare =

Irish Jacobite (1638–1694)

Valentine Browne
- Viscount Kenmare
- Tenure: 1689–1694
- Predecessor: Valentine, 2nd Baronet
- Successor: Nicholas, 2nd Viscount Kenmare
- Born: 1638
- Died: 1694 (aged 55–56)
- Spouse: Jane Plunkett
- Issue Detail: Nicholas & others
- Father: Valentine, 2nd Baronet
- Mother: Mary MacCarthy

Sir Valentine Browne, 1st Viscount Kenmare and 3rd Baronet Browne of Molahiffe (1638–1694), was an Irish Jacobite who fought for James II of England in the Williamite War in Ireland.

== Birth and origins ==
Family tree

Valentine Browne with wife, parents, and other selected relatives. (Note: This family tree is based on genealogies of the baronets Browne and the viscounts Muskerry (later earls of Clancarty).)

Nicholas; Browne d. 1606	Sheela; O'Sullivan; Beare	Charles; 1st Viscount; Muskerry; 1564–1641
Alice; FitzGerald	Valentine; 1st Bt. d. 1633	Julia; MacCarthy d. 1633
Valentine; 2nd Bt. d. 1640	Mary; MacCarthy
Valentine; 1st Viscount; 1638–1694	Jane; Plunkett
Nicholas; 2nd Viscount d. 1720	Helen; Browne
Honora; Butler	Valentine; 3rd Viscount; 1695–1736	Mary; FitzGerald

Legend

XXX	Subject of the article	XXX	Browne Baronets & Viscounts Kenmare	XXX	Viscounts; Muskerry

Valentine was born in 1638. He was the eldest son of Valentine Browne and Mary MacCarthy. His father was the 2nd Baronet Browne of Molahiffe, County Kerry.

His mother was a daughter of Charles MacCarthy, 1st Viscount Muskerry. His mother's family were the MacCarthys of Muskerry, a Gaelic Irish dynasty that branched from the MacCarthy-Mor line with Dermot MacCarthy, second son of Cormac MacCarthy-Mor, a medieval Prince of Desmond. This second son had been granted the Muskerry area as appanage.

He was one of four siblings, who are listed in his father's article.

== Early life ==
Browne succeeded his father in 1640 as the 3rd Baronet Browne at the age of two. As a child he was a ward of Donough MacCarty, 2nd Viscount Muskerry, his maternal uncle. Muskerry fought with the Irish Catholic Confederates against the Irish government, the English Parliament and the Cromwellians in the Irish Rebellion of 1641, the Irish Confederate Wars and the Cromwellian conquest of Ireland. Muskerry made Ross Castle, which belonged to Browne, his last stand against Cromwell's General Edmund Ludlow, surrendered on 27 June 1652 and went into exile.

== Marriage and children ==
Sir Valentine married Jane Plunkett, only daughter and heir of Sir Nicholas Plunkett of Balrath, County Meath, the lawyer and Confederate politician.

Valentine and Jane had five sons:

1. Nicholas (about 1660 – 1720), 2nd Viscount Browne
2. Ossory (died 1666), without issue
3. Patrick (died 1675) without issue
4. James (died 1680) without issue
5. Valentine, died without issue

—and four daughters:

1. Mary (died 1703), married 1685 George Aylmer of Lyons, County Kildare
2. Ellis, married Nicholas Purcell, Baron of Loughmoe
3. Thomasine, married Nicholas Bourke of Cahirmoil, County Limerick
4. Katherine, married the Portuguese ambassador in London, Dom Luís da Cunha

== Restoration ==
Sir Valentine received some lands under the Act of Settlement of 1662.

== Jacobite ==
Sir Valentine commanded a regiment in the Irish army and seems to have been taken prisoner at the Battle of Aughrim in 1691.

=== Viscount Kenmare ===
Sir Valentine was created 1st Viscount Kenmare and Baron Castlerosse (after Ross Castle) on 20 May 1689, by King James II, after his deposition by the English Parliament, but while he still possessed his rights as King of Ireland. At the time James was presiding over the short-lived Patriot Parliament. The peerage remained on the Irish patent roll in a constitutionally ambiguous position, but was not recognized by the Protestant political establishment.

== Catholicism and Death ==
The 1st Viscount Kenmare wrote in his will that he wanted to be buried in "some decent Catholic church, monastery, abbey, or graveyard". He was therefore Catholic despite the English origin of his family. He died in 1694 and was succeeded by his eldest son Nicholas.

== Notes and references ==
=== Sources ===
- Adams, Constance Louisa (1904). Castles of Ireland – Some Fortress Histories and Legends. London: Elliot Stock. OCLC 751487142.
- Burke, Bernard (1883). A Genealogical History of the Dormant, Abeyant, Forfeited and Extinct Peerages of the British Empire (New ed.). London: Harrison. OCLC 499232768.
- Burke, Bernard; Burke, Ashworth Peter (1915). A Genealogical and Heraldic History of the Peerage and Baronetage, the Privy Council, Knightage and Companionage (77th ed.). London: Harrison. OCLC 1155471554. – (for Kenmare)
- Cokayne, George Edward (1892). Complete Peerage of England, Scotland, Ireland, Great Britain and the United Kingdom, Extant, Extinct, or Dormant. Vol. IV (1st ed.). London: George Bell and Sons. OCLC 1180828941. – G to K (for Kenmare)
- Cokayne, George Edward (1900). Complete Baronetage, 1611 to 1800. Vol. I (1st ed.). Exeter: William Pollard & Co. OCLC 866278985. – 1611 to 1625 (for Browne)
- Cokayne, George Edward (1913). Gibbs, Vicary (ed.). The complete peerage of England, Scotland, Ireland, Great Britain and the United Kingdom, extant, extinct, or dormant. Vol. III (2nd ed.). London: St Catherine Press. OCLC 228661424. – Canonteign to Cutts (for Clancarty)
- Lainé, P. Louis (1836). "Mac-Carthy". Archives généalogiques et historiques de la noblesse de France [Genealogical and Historical Archives of the Nobility of France] (in French). Vol. Tome cinquième. Paris: Imprimerie de Bethune et Plon. pp. 1–102. OCLC 865941166.
- Lodge, John (1789). Archdall, Mervyn (ed.). The Peerage of Ireland or, A Genealogical History of the Present Nobility of that Kingdom. Vol. VII. Dublin: James Moore. OCLC 264906028. – Barons
- Ó Ciardha, Éamonn (October 2009). McGuire, James; Quinn, James (eds.). "Browne, Nicholas". Dictionary of Irish Biography. – (for the 2nd Viscount Kenmare)
- O'Hart, John (1892). Irish Pedigrees: Or, the Origin and Stem of the Irish Nation. Vol. I (5th ed.). Dublin: James Duffy & Co. OCLC 7239210. – Irish stem
- Ohlmeyer, Jane H. (2004). "MacCarthy, Donough, first earl of Clancarty (1594–1665)". In Matthew, Colin; Harrison, Brian (eds.). Oxford Dictionary of National Biography. Vol. 35. New York: Oxford University Press. pp. 107–108. ISBN 0-19-861385-7.
- Ruvigny, Melville Henry, Marquis de (1904). Jacobite Peerage Baronetage Knightage and Grants of Honour. Edinburgh: T C & E C Jack. OCLC 655825906.

Peerage of Ireland
New creation	— TITULAR — Viscount Kenmare; Jacobite peerage 1689–1694	Succeeded by Nicholas Browne
Baronetage of Ireland
Preceded by Valentine Browne	Baronet (of Molahiffe); 1640–1694	Succeeded by Nicholas Browne
