= Commissioned survey =

A commissioned survey is a kind of archaeological and social survey performed in return for money or goods. Typically, these surveys were conducted in the pre-colonial Era, as part of the Age of European Enlightenment to study territories before colonization. They would usually extend to significant and detailed efforts by trading companies to study institutions of indigenous communities as a precursor to colonial powers exerting colonial supremacy. An example would be when soldiers of the East India Company were paid fees to study exotic lands, customs, cultures, and literatures of the colonized world. The end product of a commissioned survey would usually be a report or book in a European language, which could form a basis for law making by colonial powers.
