= Sir Valentine Browne =

16th-century English politician

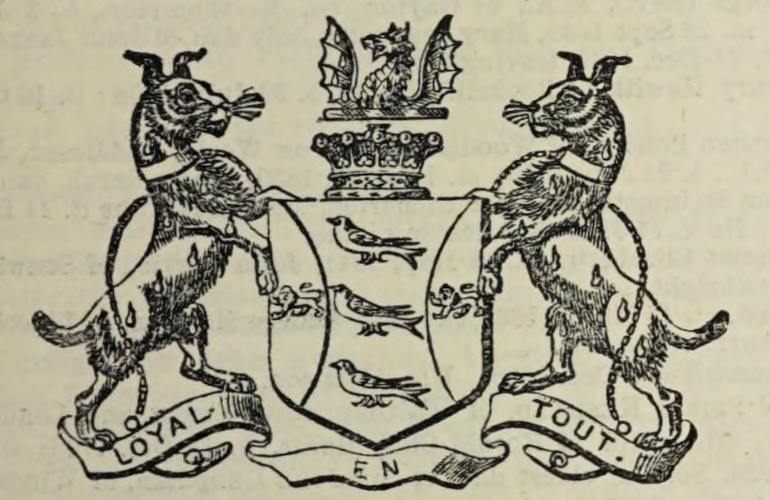
- Died: 8 February 1589; Dublin
- Family: Ancestor of the Earls of Kenmare
- Spouses: 1. Alice (or Elizabeth) Alexander; 2. Thomasine Bacon
- Issue Detail: Valentine, Nicholas, Thomas, & others
- Father: Sir Valentine Browne of Croft

Sir Valentine Browne (died 1589), of Croft, Lincolnshire, was auditor, treasurer and victualler of Berwick-upon-Tweed. He acquired large estates in Ireland during the Plantation of Munster, in particular the seignory of Molahiffe. He lived at Ross Castle near Killarney, County Kerry. He was MP in three English and one Irish parliaments.

== Early life ==
Valentine was probably born in the late 1510s or early 1520s (Note: He was over 60 in 1584.) in Croft, Lincolnshire, eldest son of Sir Valentine Browne, knight, of Croft, who died in 1568. His father's family had been established in Totteridge, Hertfordshire, and in Hoxton, Middlesex (now in London), before moving to Lincolnshire. Nothing seems to be known about his mother.

From 1550 to 1553 Browne was auditor at Berwick Castle. From 1553 to 1560 he was Auditor-General of Ireland. He was appointed Surveyor General of Ireland in 1559 by Queen Elizabeth I of England, later being appointed Auditor of the Exchequer.

== Berwick ==
Browne was appointed by Queen Elizabeth in the 1560s to several positions at Berwick-upon-Tweed, an important garrison of the English army on the Scottish border. As victualler and treasurer, he paid the troops and bought food for them.

=== Marian civil war ===
Browne was involved in financial aspects of the diplomacy and negotiations during the Scottish Reformation and the Marian civil war in which the English supported the King's party led by the Regent Moray who ruled Scotland for the young James VI of Scotland against the Queen's party, which supported Mary, Queen of Scots. In 1568, Robert Melville discussed loans for the King's party secured on Mary's jewels. Regent Moray arranged credit with Browne for his diplomatic envoy John Wood in March 1569.

=== Rising of the North ===
In 1569 the earls of Westmorland, and Northumberland rose against Queen Elizabeth supporting the Catholic religion and the claim of Mary Stuart, Queen of Scots to the English throne. The rebels occupied Durham on 14 November 1569 where mass was celebrated in the cathedral. Lord Thomas Radclyffe, 3rd Earl of Sussex, Lord President of the North, assembled an army in York and marched against the rebels. Browne had stayed loyal to Elizabeth and led some troops on this march as we know from a letter he wrote on 16 December 1569 to Henry Carey, 1st Baron Hunsdon, while approaching Durham. The rebels avoided engaging Sussex's superior forces and fled into Scotland. Lesser landlords involved in the rebellion were pardoned upon paying a fine that was collected by Thomas Gargrave, High Sheriff of Yorkshire, who handed the accounts and the money to Browne, treasurer, in July 1570. Browne was knighted by the Earl of Sussex in 1570 becoming Sir Valentine Browne of Totteridge (Hertfordshire), Croft (Lincolnshire), and Hoggsden (Middlesex).

After negotiations with Scottish regents the rebel Thomas Percy, 7th Earl of Northumberland was brought to Eyemouth by the Laird of Cleish and then to Berwick-upon-Tweed in June 1572, where he was lodged in Valentine Browne's house. Browne spent £12 pounds on clothes for the Earl and £109 on food, bought from a Berwick merchant Edward Merrie. The Earl was sent to York in August.

=== Later life ===
In 1571, Browne was elected MP for Berwick-upon-Tweed for the English Parliament of 1571. In 1572 he was elected MP for Thetford for the English Parliament of 1572.

He was Governor of Berwick in May 1573,during the "Lang Siege" of Edinburgh Castle during the Marian civil war (1568–1573). After the siege, Browne acquired some of the jewels of Mary, Queen of Scots that Sir William Drury brought from Scotland. His page Gilbert Edward stole jewels from him including a diamond and ruby studded gold mermaid with a diamond shield or mirror, and a gold chain marked with Sir Valentine's initials "v. b." at the clasp. The costume of the runaway page was described, with yellow doublet, peach-coloured hose, blue stockings, and a grey hat. Browne's management of finance at Berwick was criticised several times.

When Francis Walsingham travelled to Scotland in August 1583, Browne wrote to him from Hoxton bemoaning the ruinous state of several castles of the north, including Bamborough, Dunstanburgh, Norham, and Etal.

== Plantation of Munster ==
In 1584, Valentine Browne became involved in the Plantation of Munster. The Irish province of Munster had been devastated since 1569 by the Desmond Rebellions which ended on 11 November 1583 when Gerald FitzGerald, 14th Earl of Desmond, the rebel earl, was killed. The earl's extensive lands were forfeit and the government planned to grant them to English undertakers and repopulate them with English settlers. In July 1584, the government commissioned a survey of these lands. Sir Valentine and Henry Wallop were appointed to manage this task. Arthur Robyns was one of the surveyors. In a letter to William Cecil, Lord Burleigh, Elizabeth's chief adviser, dated 10 October 1584, Sir Valentine wrote that "the work was so difficult as to have extended over three years." He further wrote from Askeaton that he had "travailed hard in superintending the survey, passing through bogs and woods, scaling mountains, and crossing many bridgeless rivers and dangerous waters", waters in which he lost some of his horses, and was twice nearly lost himself; that his son had broken his arm, and that "the service was so severe that many of the men had fallen sick". He described the towns and villages as ruined, and wrote that "not one of thirty persons" was left alive after the famine caused by crop destructions, and "those for the most part starvelings". Desmond's lands, thus nearly void of inhabitants, were, however, "replenished with wood, rivers, and fishings". Sir Valentine's survey divided the escheated lands into 35 seignories.

While living at Ross Castle near Killarney, Sir Valentine was in April 1585 elected MP for County Sligo in the Irish parliament of 1585/1586.

In 1586 He was elected MP of Berwick-upon-Tweed for the English Parliament of 1586, which submitted a petition demanding the execution of Mary Stuart, Queen of Scots.

In 1587 Sir Valentine returned to Ireland and applied for one of the seignories. He was granted Currans (in Kerry) in the early 1587 allotment, but this seignory was finally given to Charles Herbert and he was provisionally given the neighbouring seignory of Molahiffe instead. Molahiffe consisted of the territories of Onaght and Coshmaine, which had belonged to two vassals of Donald McCarthy, 1st Earl of Clancare who had sided with the rebels and died in the war. Clancare successfully claimed the lands for himself and then at a meeting with Sir Valentine in London on 28 June 1588 mortgaged them to him for about £600. Sir Valentine ended up owning 6,500 acres (26 km^{2}) of land in County Kerry alone, in addition to earlier grants including the village of Hospital, County Limerick. He built a castle near this village, called Kenmare Castle. In 1588 when the Spanish Armada was menacing the coasts, he commanded a company for Ireland's defence.

== Death, succession, and timeline ==
Sir Valentine died on 8 February 1589 in Dublin and was buried in St Catherine's Church, Dublin (Church of Ireland), on 19 February 1589.

He was succeeded in England by his eldest son Valentine Browne of Croft and in Ireland by his second son Nicholas and his son Thomas. Nicholas was knighted and thus became Sir Nicholas. He married Sheila (or Julia), a daughter of Eoin the O'Sullivan Beare and probably converted to Catholicism to do so. O'Sullivan had lost his chieftainship to his nephew Donal Cam O'Sullivan Beare who had claimed a right to it by primogeniture.

== Marriages and children ==
Family tree

Sir Valentine Browne with his two wives, his father, and other selected relatives. (Note: This family tree is based on genealogies of the baronets Browne (later earls of Kenmare))

Valentine; Browne d. 1568
Alice; Alexander | Valentine; Browne d. 1589; Auditor | Thomasine; Bacon
Valentine; Browne d. 1606; Croft | Elizabeth; Monson d. 1635 | Nicholas; Browne d. 1606 | Sheela; O'Sullivan; Beare
Valentine; Browne c. 1582 – 1626; MP | Valentine; 1st Baronet d. 1633 | Alice; FitzGerald

Legend

| XXX | Subject of the article | XXX | Browne; Baronets |

Valentine Browne married first Alice or Elizabeth, a daughter of Robert Alexander of London.

Valentine and Alice had a son:

1. Valentine Browne (died 1606), High Sheriff of Lincolnshire, inherited the English lands. He married Elizabeth Monson, sister of Sir Thomas Monson, 1st Baronet, and had a son Valentine, who was MP for Lincolnshire.

A Valentine Brown of Lincolnshire was knighted by King James I at Belvoir Castle on 23 April 1603, but whether it was his eldest son or grandson is not sure.

=== Second marriage ===
Valentine Browne married secondly Thomasine, daughter of Robert Bacon and sister of Nicholas Bacon, the Lord Keeper.

Valentine and Thomasine had two sons:

1. Nicholas (died 1606), knight of Molahiffe, received most of the Irish lands as appanage
2. Thomas (died 1640) who received the village of Hospital, County Limerick, as appanage

—and a daughter:

1. Elizabeth

Timeline
As his birth date is uncertain, so are all his ages.
| Age | Date | Event |
| 0 | 1520, estimate | Born |
| 29–30 | 1550 | Auditor in Ireland |
| 37–38 | 1558, 17 Nov | Accession of Queen Elizabeth I, succeeding Queen Mary I |
| 47–48 | 1568 | Father died. |
| 48–49 | 1569 | Outbreak of the Rising of the North |
| 49–50 | 1570 | Knighted by Thomas Radclyffe, 3rd Earl of Sussex |
| 50–51 | 1571 | Returned as MP for Berwick upon Tweed for the English Parliament of 1571 |
| 51–52 | 1572 | Returned as MP for Thetford for the English Parliament of 1572 |
| 54–55 | 1575 | Lost his office as victualler of Berwick. |
| 63–64 | 1584 | Sworn of the Irish Privy Council |
| 64–65 | 1585 | Returned as MP for County Sligo in the Irish parliament. |
| 65–66 | 1586 | Returned as MP for Berwick-upon-Tweed for the English Parliament of 1586–1587 |
| 65–66 | 1586 | Son Nicholas is Sheriff of Kerry. |
| 68–69 | 8 Feb 1589 | Died in Dublin |

== Notes and references ==
=== Sources ===
- Black, John Bennett (1936). The Reign of Elizabeth 1558–1603. Oxford: Clarendon Press. OCLC 1245777839.
- Boyd, William K., ed. (1905). Calendar of the State Papers Relating to Scotland and Mary, Queen of Scots 1547–1603. Vol. IV. Edinburgh: Her Majesty's General Register House. OCLC 1137227125. – 1571 to 1574
- Brydges, Egerton (1817). A Biographical Peerage of the Empire of Great Britain. London: J. Nichols. OCLC 80392503.
- Burke, Bernard; Burke, Ashworth Peter (1909). A Genealogical and Heraldic History of the Peerage and Baronetage, the Privy Council, Knightage and Companionage (71st ed.). London: Harrison. OCLC 28297274.
- Camm, Bede (1914). Lives of the English Martyrs. London: Longmans, Green and Co. OCLC 1048771976.
- Canny, Nicholas (2001). Making Ireland British. Oxford: Oxford University Press. ISBN 019-820091-9.
- Clavin, Terry (October 2009). "MacCarthy Mór, Donal". Dictionary of Irish Biography.
- Cokayne, George Edward (1900). Complete Baronetage, 1611 to 1800. Vol. I (1st ed.). Exeter: William Pollard & Co. OCLC 866278985. – 1611 to 1625
- Fraser, William (1890). The Melvilles, Earls of Melville and the Leslies, Earls of Leven. Vol. First. Edinburgh: privately printed. OCLC 1049643446. – Memoirs
- Fryde, E. B.; Greenway, D. E.; Porter, S.; Roy, I., eds. (1986). Handbook of British Chronology. Royal Historical Society Guides and Handbooks, No. 2 (3rd ed.). London: Offices of the Royal Historical Society. ISBN 0-86193-106-8. – (for timeline)
- Green, Mary Ann Everett, ed. (1872). Calendar State Papers Domestic Series of the Reigns of Elizabeth and James I., Addenda 1580–1625. London: Longman & Co. OCLC 933109717. – 1580 to 1625
- Grose, Francis; Astle, Thomas (1807). The Antiquarian Repertory: A Miscellaneous Assemblage of Topography, History, Biography, Customs and Manners. Vol. I (A new ed.). Edward Jeffery. OCLC 1039962171.
- Hamilton, Hans Claude, ed. (1877). Calendar of the State Papers Relating to Ireland, of the Reign of Elizabeth, 1586–1588, July. London: Longman & Co.
- Hasler, P. W., ed. (1981). The House of Commons 1558 – 1603. Vol. I. London: His/Her Majesty's Stationery Office. ISBN 0-11-887501-9. – A to C
- Historical Manuscripts Commission (HMC) (1877). Sixth Report of the Royal Commission on Historical Manuscripts. Vol. Part I. London: George Edward Eyre and William Spottiswoode. OCLC 743337392. – Report and appendix
- House of Commons (1878). Return. Members of Parliament – Part II. Parliaments of Great Britain, 1705–1796. Parliaments of the United Kingdom, 1801–1874. Parliaments and Conventions of the Estates of Scotland, 1357–1707. Parliaments of Ireland, 1599–1800. London: His/Her Majesty's Stationery Office. OCLC 13112546.
- Lodge, John (1789). Archdall, Mervyn (ed.). The Peerage of Ireland or, A Genealogical History of the Present Nobility of that Kingdom. Vol. VII. Dublin: James Moore. OCLC 264906028. – Barons (under Aylmer)
- MacCarthy-Morrogh, Michael (1983). The Munster Plantation 1583–1641 (PDF) (Ph.D.). Royal Holloway, University of London.
- McCormack, Anthony M.; Clavin, Terry (October 2009). "Browne, Valentine". Dictionary of Irish Biography.
- Porrett, Robert (1844). "Extracts of the Copy-Book of Letters Received by Sir Henry Witherington Knt. Marshal of Berwick between Nov. 1581 and Nov. 1592". Archaeologia: Or, Miscellaneous Tracts Relating to Antiquity. 30: 160–173.
- Shaw, William A. (1906). The Knights of England. Vol. II. London: Sherratt & Hughes. – Knights bachelors & Index
- Venn, John; Venn, J. A. (1922). Alumni Cantabrigienses: Part 1: From the Earliest Times to 1751. Vol. I. London: Cambridge University Press. OCLC 1039474173. – Abbas to Cutts
- Wright, Thomas (1838a). Queen Elizabeth and her Times, a Series of Original Letters. Vol. I. London: Henry Colburn.
- Wright, Thomas (1838b). Queen Elizabeth and her Times, a Series of Original Letters. Vol. II. London: Henry Colburn.

Parliament of Ireland
| Unknown | Member of Parliament for County Sligo; 1585–1586; With: John Crofton; John Marbury | Succeeded by Thady O'Hara; Bryan McDonogh |
