= 6th Parliament of Elizabeth I =

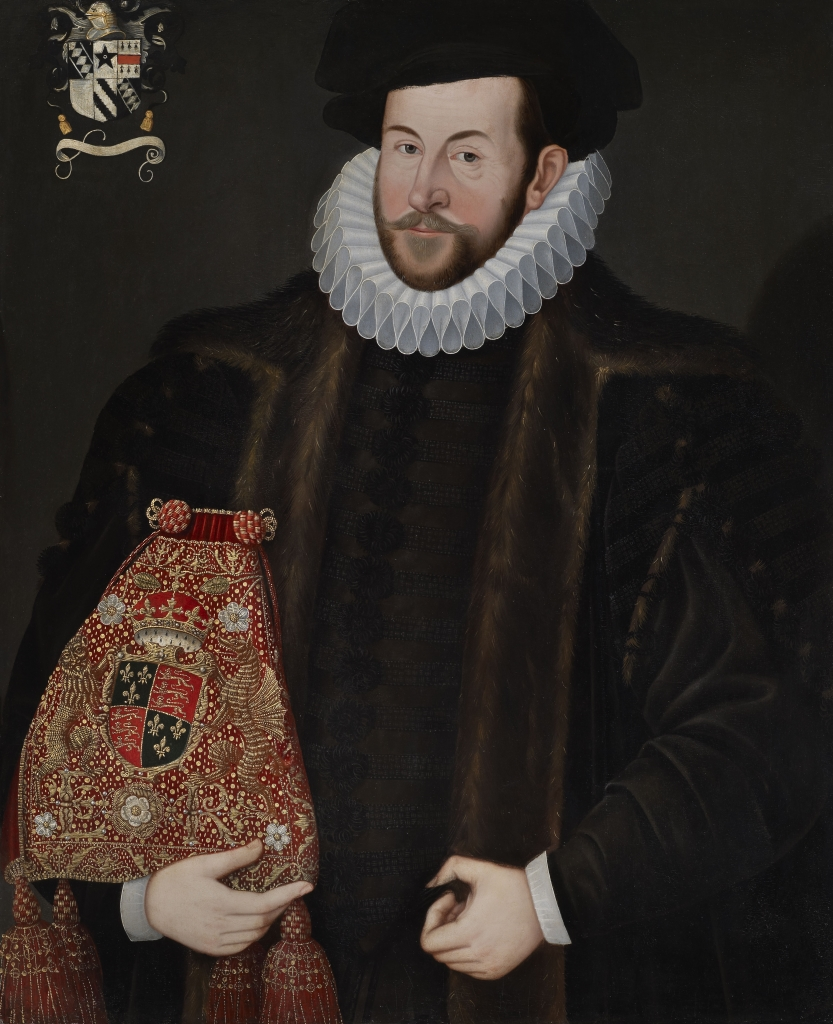
Sir John Puckering, Speaker

The 6th Parliament of Queen Elizabeth I was summoned by Queen Elizabeth I on 15 September 1586 and assembled on 15 October 1586.

Like both the 4th and 5th Parliaments of Elizabeth, the 6th Parliament was summoned as a result of yet another foiled Catholic plot to depose the Queen in favour of Mary Stuart, Queen of Scots. The Babington Plot had been uncovered while the previous Parliament was prorogued for the Summer, the ringleaders executed and Mary removed to more secure quarters. As only Parliament were in a position to deal with the question of the execution of Mary, the deposed head of a foreign state, the previous Parliament was quickly dissolved and a new one summoned. Constituencies were urged to return the previous member and the previous Speaker of the House of Commons, Sir John Puckering, was reappointed. However, Queen Elizabeth herself was reluctant to take such extreme action against her own cousin and fellow monarch and absented herself from the State opening of the new Parliament.

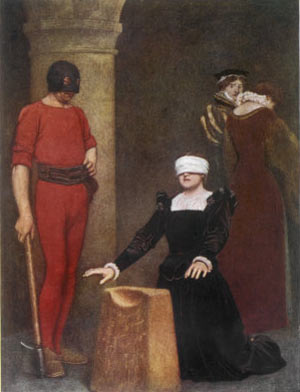
Execution of Mary, Queen of Scots

By the 12 October 1586 a joint petition from both Houses of Parliament had been presented calling for Mary Stuart's execution. Elizabeth stalled as long as possible but finally signed the death warrant on 1 February 1587. Even then she belatedly attempted to call it back but by then Mary had been executed at Fotheringhay Castle on 8 February 1587.

Once Parliament had resumed sitting, the debate ill-advisedly turned towards matters of religious reform led by the Puritans Anthony Cope and Peter Wentworth, both of whom were immediately committed to the Tower for several weeks for ignoring Elizabeth I's ecclesiastical prerogative. After being advised to treat Puritans and sectaries as equal to Jesuits in their ability to undermine the stability of both church and realm the Commons eventually settled down to routine business, passing 10 bills and confirming the subsidy (funds voted to the crown for the administration of the realm) before its dissolution on 23 March 1587.

== See also ==
- List of acts of the 6th Parliament of Queen Elizabeth I
- List of parliaments of England
