= Earl of Kenmare =

- Arms: Argent, three Martlets in pale between two Flaunches Sable, each charged with a Lion passant Argent. Crest: A Dragon's Head couped Argent, between two Wings Sable, gouttée-d'eau. Supporters: On either side a Lynx Argent, gouttée-de-poix, plain collared and chained Or.
- Creation date: 2 January 1801
- Created by: George III
- Peerage: Peerage of Ireland
- First holder: Valentine Browne, 1st Earl of Kenmare
- Last holder: Gerald Browne, 7th Earl of Kenmare
- Subsidiary titles: Viscount Kenmare; Viscount Castlerosse; Baron Castlerosse; Baron Kenmare; Baronet 'of Molahiffe'
- Status: Extinct
- Extinction date: 14 February 1952
- Motto: Loyal en tout (Loyal in everything)

The title of Earl of Kenmare was created in the Peerage of Ireland in 1801. It became extinct upon the death of the 7th Earl in 1952.

All of the Earls bore the subsidiary titles of Viscount Castlerosse (1801), Viscount Kenmare (1798), and Baron Castlerosse (1798) in the Peerage of Ireland. The 2nd Earl was created Baron Kenmare, of Castlerosse in the County of Kerry in the Peerage of the United Kingdom in 1841, but this title became extinct upon his death. His brother and successor, the third earl, was again created Baron Kenmare, of Castlerosse in the County of Kerry in the Peerage of the United Kingdom in 1856, and this title survived until the extinction of the earldom in 1952.

== The Browne line ==
- Sir Valentine Browne, knight (died 1589)
- Sir Nicholas Browne (died 12 December 1606)

== Baronets Browne of Molahiffe, County Kerry (1622) ==
- Sir Valentine Browne, 1st Baronet (died 7 September 1633)
- Sir Valentine Browne, 2nd Baronet (died 25 April 1640)
- Valentine Browne, 3rd Baronet (1638–1694)

== Viscounts Kenmare, Barons Castlerosse (1689) ==
The third Baronet Browne was created first Viscount Kenmare and Baron Castlerosse (Ireland) on 20 May 1689, by King James II, after his deposition by the English Parliament, but while he still possessed his rights as King of Ireland. At the time James was presiding over the short-lived Patriot Parliament. The peerage remained on the Irish patent roll in a constitutionally ambiguous position, but was not recognized by the Protestant political establishment.

- Sir Valentine Browne, 1st Viscount Kenmare, 3rd Baronet (1638–1694), attainted 1691
- Sir Nicholas Browne, 2nd Viscount Kenmare, 4th Baronet (died April 1720)
- Sir Valentine Browne, 3rd Viscount Kenmare, 5th Baronet (March 1695 – 30 June 1736)
- Sir Thomas Browne, 4th Viscount Kenmare, 6th Baronet (1726 – 9 September 1795)

== Earls of Kenmare (1801) ==
The seventh Baronet Browne was created first Baron Castlerosse and first Viscount Kenmare on 12 February 1798, with the earlier peerages not being recognised. He was created first Earl of Kenmare on 3 January 1801.

- Valentine Browne, 1st Earl of Kenmare (January 1754 – 1812)
- Valentine Browne, 2nd Earl of Kenmare (1788–1853), son of the 1st Earl, married Augusta Anne Wilmot, 2nd daughter of Sir Robert Wilmot, Bart.
- Thomas Browne, 3rd Earl of Kenmare (1789–1871), brother of the 2nd Earl, married Catherine O'Callaghan
- Valentine Augustus Browne, 4th Earl of Kenmare (1825–1905), son of the 3rd Earl, married Gertrude-Harriet Thynne, only daughter of Lord Charles Thynne, son of the 2nd Marquis of Bath
- Valentine Charles Browne, 5th Earl of Kenmare (1860–1941)
- Valentine Edward Charles Browne, 6th Earl of Kenmare (1891–1943)
- Gerald Ralph Desmond Browne, 7th Earl of Kenmare (1896–1952)

== Notes ==
=== Cite books ===
- Hesilrige, Arthur G. M. (1921). Debrett's Peerage and Titles of courtesy. 160A, Fleet street, London, UK: Dean & Son. p. 510.
- Cokayne, George Edward (1900). George Edward Cokayne (ed.). The Complete Baronetage. Gloucester: Alan Sutton Publishing. "Reprinted in 1983"
- Harrison, Brian (2004). ""Browne, Thomas, fourth Viscount Kenmare"". The Dictionary of National Biography. Oxford: Oxford University Press. ISBN 0-19-861411-X. "H. C. G. Matthew"
