= Sir Valentine Browne, 1st Baronet =

Irish baronet (died 1633)

Valentine Browne
- Browne Baronets of Molahiffe
- Tenure: 1622–1633
- Successor: Valentine, 2nd Baronet
- Died: 7 September 1633
- Spouses: Alice FitzGerald; Julia MacCarty
- Issue Detail: Valentine & others
- Father: Nicholas Browne
- Mother: Sheela O'Sullivan Beare

Sir Valentine Browne, 1st Baronet, of Molahiffe (died 1633), owned a large estate in south-west Ireland and was a lawyer who served as high sheriff of County Kerry.

== Birth and origins ==
Valentine was probably born in the 1580s in Ireland. He was the eldest son of Nicholas Browne and his wife Sheela O'Sullivan Beare. His father was Sir Nicholas Browne of Ross Castle. His paternal grandfather, another Valentine Browne, had come from Croft, and had acquired large estates in Munster, Ireland as surveyor-general.

His mother was a daughter of Eoin the O'Sullivan Beare who had lost his chieftainship to his nephew Donal Cam O'Sullivan Beare who had claimed a right to it by primogeniture. His mother's family were part of the O'Sullivans, a Gaelic Irish clan. His father probably converted to Catholicism to marry his mother.

Family tree

Valentine Browne with his two wives, his parents, and other selected relatives. (Note: This family tree is based on genealogies of the baronets Browne and the viscounts Muskerry (later earls of Clancarty).)

Alice; Alexander	Valentine; Browne d. 1589; Surveyor; General	Thomasine; Bacon
Gerald; 14th Earl; Desmond c. 1533 – 1583; Rebel Earl	Nicholas; Browne d. 1606	Sheela; O'Sullivan; Beare	Charles; 1st Viscount; 1564–1641
Alice; FitzGerald	Valentine; 1st Bt. d. 1633	Julia; MacCarthy d. 1633
Valentine; 2nd Bt. d. 1640	Thomas; Browne d. 1684	Mary; MacCarthy
Valentine; 1st Viscount; 1638–1694	Jane; Plunkett

Legend

XXX	Subject of the article	XXX	Browne Baronets & Viscounts Kenmare	XXX	Viscounts; Muskerry
XXX	Earls of Desmond

== Early life ==
Browne studied law and was admitted to Gray's Inn on 12 March 1612. On 21 December 1621 Browne was created Baronet Browne of Molahiffe. In 1623 Sir Valentine was appointed Sheriff of County Kerry.

== First marriage and children ==
Sir Valentine married first Alice FitzGerald, fifth daughter of Gerald FitzGerald, 14th Earl of Desmond, the rebel earl, by his second wife, Eleanor Butler.

Valentine and Alice had five children, three sons:

1. Valentine (died 1640), his successor
2. James, captain in the army
3. Nicholas, died without issue

—and two daughters of whom nothing further seems to be known.

== Second marriage and children ==
Sir Valentine married secondly Julia MacCarty, daughter of Charles MacCarthy, 1st Viscount Muskerry.

Valentine and Julia had one son:

1. Thomas (died 1684), who married his cousin Elizabeth Browne, daughter of Sir John Browne, knight, of Hospital, County Limerick, and Barbara Boyle, daughter of John Boyle, Bishop of Cork, and had several daughters including Helen, who married her cousin Nicholas Browne, 2nd Viscount Kenmare

== Death and timeline ==
Sir Valentine died on 7 September 1633 and was buried in the church of Killarney.

Timeline
As his birth date is uncertain, so are all his ages. Italics for historical background.
Age	Date	Event
0	Estimated 1580	Born
8–9	1589	Paternal grandfather Sir Valentine Browne died.
17–18	1598	The Sugan Earl's revolt broke out.
20–21	22 Sep 1601	The Spanish landed at Kinsale
22–23	24 Mar 1603	Accession of James I, succeeding Elizabeth I
22–23	30 Mar 1603	Treaty of Mellifont, concluded between Mountjoy and Tyrone, ended the Nine Years' War.
25–26	12 Dec 1606	Inherited the Molahiffe seignory and other Irish lands at his father's death
31–32	12 Mar 1612	Admitted to Gray's Inn
41–42	16 Feb 1622	Created 1st Baronet Browne of Molahiffe
44–45	27 Mar 1625	Accession of Charles I, succeeding James I
59–60	7 Sep 1633	Died

== Notes and references ==
=== Sources ===
- Brydges, Egerton (1817). A Biographical Peerage of the Empire of Great Britain. London: J. Nichols. OCLC 80392503.
- Burke, Bernard (1883). A Genealogical History of the Dormant, Abeyant, Forfeited and Extinct Peerages of the British Empire (New ed.). London: Harrison. OCLC 499232768. (for Desmond)
- Burke, Bernard; Burke, Ashworth P. (1915). A Genealogical and Heraldic History of the Peerage and Baronetage, the Privy Council, Knightage and Companionage (77th ed.). London: Harrison. OCLC 1155471554.
- Fryde, E. B.; Greenway, D. E.; Porter, S.; Roy, I., eds. (1986). Handbook of British Chronology. Royal Historical Society Guides and Handbooks, No. 2 (3rd ed.). London: Offices of the Royal Historical Society. ISBN 0-86193-106-8. – (for timeline)
- G. E. C. (1900). Complete Baronetage, 1611 to 1800. Vol. I (1st ed.). Exeter: William Pollard & Co. OCLC 866278985. – 1611 to 1625 (for Browne)
- G. E. C. (1913). Gibbs, Vicary (ed.). The Complete Peerage of England, Scotland, Ireland, Great Britain and the United Kingdom, Extant, Extinct, or Dormant. Vol. III (2nd ed.). London: The St Catherine Press. OCLC 228661424. – Canonteign to Cutts (for Clancarty)
- Hasler, P. W., ed. (1981). The House of Commons 1558–1603. Vol. I. London: His/Her Majesty's Stationery Office. ISBN 0-11-887501-9. – A to C
- Joyce, Patrick Weston (1903). A Concise History of Ireland from the Earliest Times to 1837 (12th ed.). Dublin: M. H. Gill & Son. OCLC 815623752.
- Lodge, John (1789). Archdall, Mervyn (ed.). The Peerage of Ireland or, A Genealogical History of the Present Nobility of that Kingdom. Vol. VII. Dublin: James Moore. OCLC 264906028. – Barons (under Aylmer)

Baronetage of Ireland
New title	Baronet (of Molahiffe); 1622–1633	Succeeded by Valentine Browne
