= Valentine Browne, 1st Earl of Kenmare =

Irish peer and landowner

The Right Honourable Valentine Browne
- The Earl of Kenmare
- Tenure: 1801–1812 (as Earl of Kenmare); 1798–1812 (as Viscount Kenmare and Baron Castlerosse); 1795–1812 (as Baronet Browne of Molahiffe)
- Predecessor: New creation (Earl of Kenmare, Viscount Kenmare, and Baron Castlerosse); Thomas Browne (as Baronet Browne of Molahiffe)
- Successor: Valentine Browne, 2nd Earl of Kenmare
- Other titles: Viscount Kenmare; Baron Castlerosse; Baronet Browne of Molahiffe
- Born: January 1754
- Died: 3 October 1812 (aged 58)
- Spouses: Charlotte Dillon (m. 1777; died 1782) Mary Aylmer (m. 1785; died 1808)
- Issue: Lady Charlotte Browne; Lady Marianna Browne; Valentine Browne, 2nd Earl of Kenmare; Thomas Browne, 3rd Earl of Kenmare; Margaret Browne; Hon. William Browne; Hon. Michael Browne; Lady Frances Browne
- Father: Thomas Browne, 4th Viscount Kenmare
- Mother: Anne Cooke

Valentine Browne, 1st Earl of Kenmare (January 1754 – 3 October 1812) was the seventh Baronet Browne. He was created first Baron Castlerosse and first Viscount Kenmare on 12 February 1798, with the earlier peerages not being recognised. He was created first Earl of Kenmare on 3 January 1801. He was the son of Thomas Browne, 4th Viscount Kenmare.

== Marriages and Family ==
He married, firstly, Charlotte Dillon (1755–82), third daughter of Henry Dillon, 11th Viscount Dillon, on 7 July 1777. Charlotte Dillon is also reported as having died on 15 August 1792 or 15 August 1812. They had one child, Lady Charlotte Browne, who was born on 15 June 1780. She married Sir George Goold on 15 May 1802.

He married, secondly, Mary Aylmer on 24 August 1785. She died on 4 September 1808. They had seven children together:

- Lady Marianna Browne (b. 15 December 1786) married Sir Thomas Gage, 7th Baronet on 9 January 1809.
- Valentine Browne, 2nd Earl of Kenmare (15 January 1788 – 31 October 1853).
- Thomas Browne, 3rd Earl of Kenmare (b. 15 January 1789 – 1871) married Catharine O'Callaghan on 26 November 1822.
- Margaret Browne (9 July 1790–died in infancy).
- Hon. William Browne (b. 1 November 1791) married Anne-Frances Segrave on 26 April 1826.
- Hon. Michael Browne (18 May 1793 – 18 November 1825), severely injured at the Battle of Waterloo.
- Lady Frances Browne (13 May 1794 – 16 May 1817).

Peerage of Ireland
New creation	Earl of Kenmare; 1801–1812	Succeeded by Valentine Browne
New creation	Viscount Kenmare; 1798–1812	Succeeded by Valentine Browne
Baronetage of Ireland
Preceded by Thomas Browne	Baronet (of Molahiffe); 1795–1812	Succeeded by Valentine Browne
