= Farran =

Village in County Cork, Ireland

Farran An Fearann (Irish)
- Village
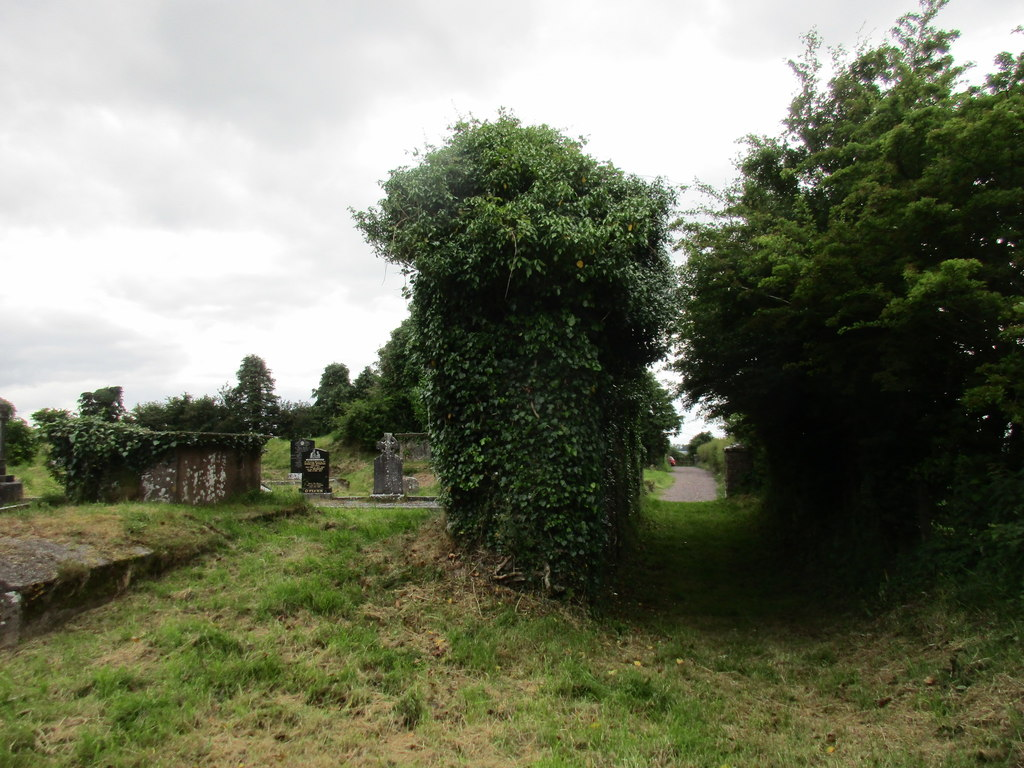
- Ruins of Aglish church and cemetery near Farran village

- Location in Ireland
- Coordinates: 51°52′26″N 08°43′12″W
- Country: Ireland
- Province: Munster
- County: County Cork

Population (2022)
  - Total: 326
- Time zone: UTC+0 (WET)
  - Summer (DST): UTC-1 (IST (WEST))

Farran (Irish: An Fearann) is a village in County Cork, Ireland, in the parish of Ovens. It lies on the southside of the River Lee. Farran is 12 miles (19 km) west from Cork City on the N22 road.

The village has a primary school, creche and Montessori school, a church, community hall, and a number of small businesses. Kilcrea Friary and Kilcrea Castle are historical sites in the area. As of the 2022 census, Farran was home to 326 people.

== Ecclesiastical history ==
=== Medieval church (Aglish) ===
Farran lies within the historical barony of Muskerry East and the ancient parish of Aglish (from Irish: Eaglais, meaning 'church'). The medieval parish church at Aglish is recorded in taxation records of 1199 as 'Magalaid', and by 1482 was recorded as 'Agalasmaschala'.

The ruins of this church, which was built of stone and lime, still show the northern and western walls. The old graveyard is to the rear of the western gable. A new graveyard was opened in the 1970s, and is still being used for families in the area.

=== 19th century church (Farran) ===
The current parish church at Farran is in the Roman Catholic parish of Ovens (formed of the ancient parishes of Aglish, Athnowen, and Desertmore). It was commissioned by the then parish priest, Fr. John Cotter, in 1860. Replacing a smaller temporary church which dated from the 1820s, it was built beside the road leading from Farran village to Aglish burial ground. Funded by local subscription, the church was built in a Gothic Revival style by contractor John Crean to designs by ME Hadfield and George Goldie of Sheffield.

Farran Church is unusual in that the entire building (rather than just the altar) is consecrated. In 2010, Farran Church celebrated its 150th year in use.

== Farran Wood and the Clarke estate ==
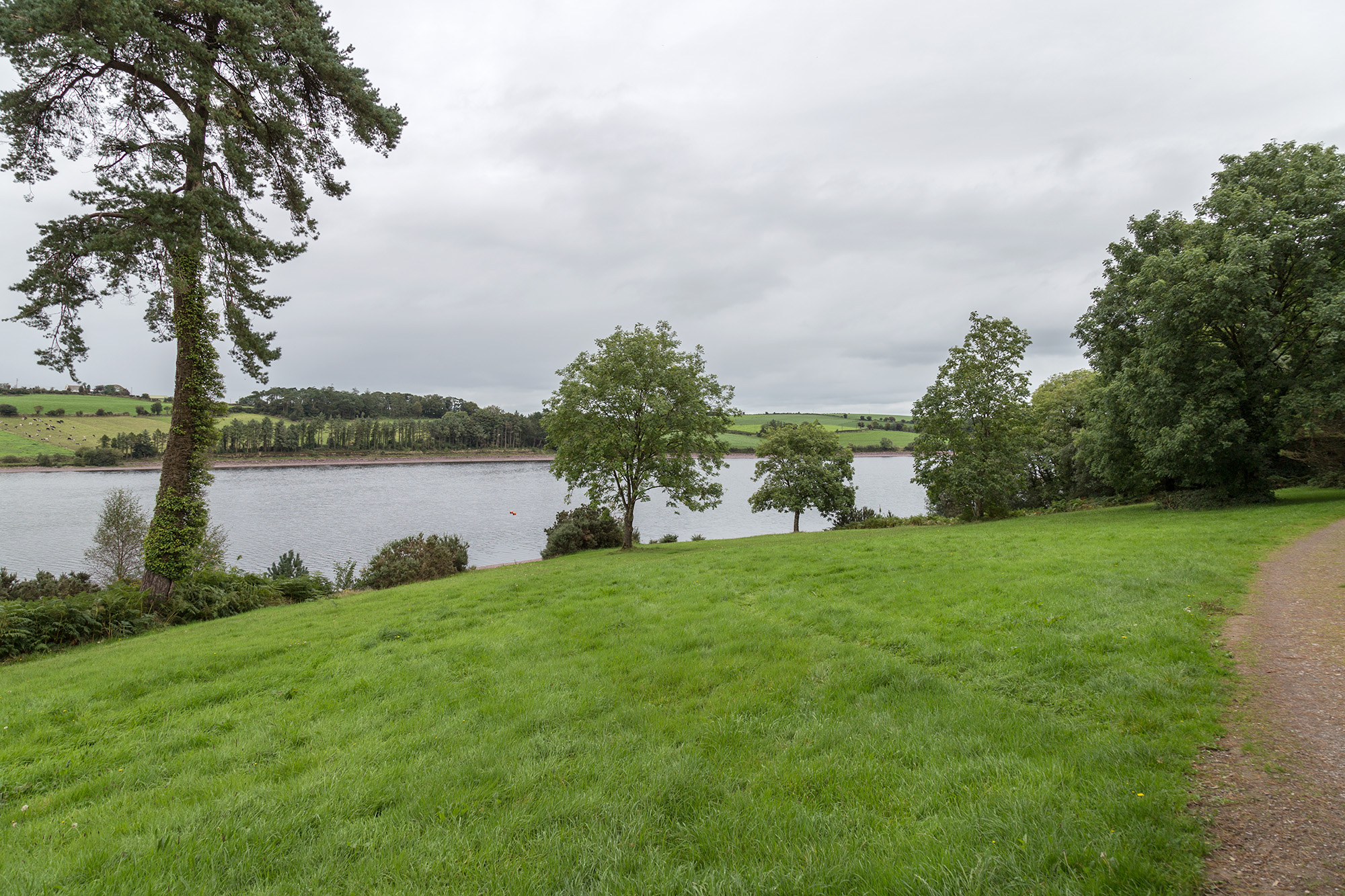
Inniscarra Lake (reservoir) from Farran Wood

Farran Forrest Park (commonly called Farran Wood) is a 44 hectares (110 acres) woodland area just north of Farran village. It is a public park operated by Coillte, and is located on the southern bank of the River Lee at Inniscarra Lake. It is the home of the National Rowing Centre.

Farran Wood was originally part of a larger estate, formerly associated with the Matthews and previously the Clarke families. The Clarke family had been local landlords who came to Farran in the mid-19th century. Originally from Liverpool in England, the Clarke family first settled in Trabolgan near Midleton and later in Farran, where they extended a Georgian house which had formerly been owned by the Penrose family. The Clarke family were involved in the tobacco industry and opened a cigar company, William Clarke & Son, in Cork in the mid-19th century.

== Neighbouring townlands ==
=== Ballineadig ===
Ballineadig townland borders Farran, and contains a "cill" site within a circular mound. This ecclesiastical enclosure, locally known as An Teampall (the temple) is traditionally associated with Saint Finbarr. There are also a number of fulacht fiadh and ringfort sites within the townland.

The name of the townland in English, Ballineadig, derives from the Irish Baile an Éadaigh ("town of the clothes"), reputedly referring to a former clothes producer in the area. The River Lee represents the northern boundary of Ballineadig. In 1957, the Electricity Supply Board constructed a dam to generate electricity at Inniscarra. This dramatically raised the water level of the river, and thus, several sections of land in Ballineadig were subject to compulsory purchase.

=== Kilcrea ===
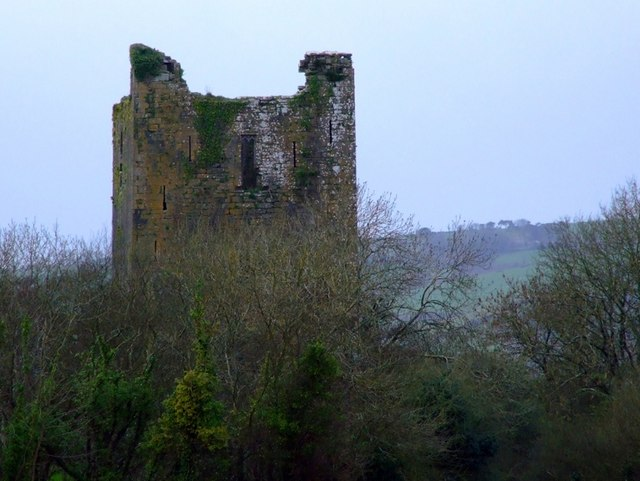
Kilcrea Castle lies south of Farran village

Kilcrea Abbey and Kilcrea Castle were both built in the 1460s by Cormac Láidir McCarthy. The ruins of the two structures lie in the townland of Kilcrea on the southern bank of the River Bride, approximately 1.5 kilometres (0.93 mi) from Farran village.

Among the people buried at Kilcrea Abbey are several generations of the MacCarthys of Muskerry, the writer Art Ó Laoghaire and Thomas O'Herlahy the Catholic Bishop of Ross. The abbey was pillaged several times, and though restored to the Franciscans in the early 17th century, was abandoned before being occupied during the Cromwellian conquest of Ireland.

Kilcrea railway station, located about 1 kilometre (0.62 mi) south of Farran Cross, was formerly a stop on the Cork-Macroom line, and accommodated cargo and passenger trains. The Farran community depended largely on the station until the widespread introduction of cars, after which the necessity of passenger trains decreased and haulage lorries reduced the need for cargo trains. Kilcrea station closed to passenger traffic in the 1930s and to goods traffic in the 1940s. The station house can still be seen today and is still occupied. The road which runs alongside the station became known as Station House Road, which runs from the N22 towards Aherla.

=== Rooves Beg ===
Within Aglish parish, in the townland of Rooves Beg, is a holy well known in Irish as Tobar Riogh an Domhnaigh (King of Sunday). It is also called Tobareen an Aifrinn (well of the mass) as mass was reputedly celebrated nearby in Penal times.

The well is on a section of road, which was once the main Cork to Kerry road (known as the butter road). The well is covered with a hood shaped construction. People traditionally visit the well on Good Friday, Easter Sunday, and mid-August.

== Notable people ==
- Liam Miller (1981–2018), association footballer with Manchester United and the Republic of Ireland national team
- Máire Ní Chéileachair, traditional sean-nós Irish singer
- Ciarán Sheehan (b.1990), All-Ireland winning Gaelic footballer and later Australian rules footballer
