= Cormac MacDermot MacCarthy, 16th Lord of Muskerry =

Irish lord (1552–1616)

Cormac MacDermot MacCarthy
- Lord of Muskerry
- Tenure: 1584–1616
- Predecessor: Callaghan, 15th Lord of Muskerry
- Successor: Charles, 1st Viscount Muskerry
- Born: 1552
- Died: 23 February 1616
- Buried: Kilcrea Friary
- Spouse: Mary Butler
- Issue Detail: Charles & others
- Father: Dermot, 13th Lord Muskerry
- Mother: Ellen FitzGerald

Cormac MacDermot MacCarthy, 16th Lord of Muskerry (1552–1616) was an Irish magnate and soldier. He fought at the Siege of Kinsale during Tyrone's Rebellion.

== Birth and origins ==
Cormac was born in 1552, the eldest son of Dermot MacCarthy and Ellen FitzGerald. His father was the 13th Lord of Muskerry. His father's full name, including his patronymic middle name, was Dermot MacTeige MacCarthy. His own full name was therefore Cormac MacDermot MacCarthy. His father's family were the MacCarthys of Muskerry, a Gaelic Irish dynasty that had branched from the MacCarthy-Mor line in the 14th century when a younger son received Muskerry as appanage.

His mother was a daughter of Sir Maurice FitzJohn FitzGerald of Totane, third son of John FitzGerald, de facto 12th Earl of Desmond and younger brother of James FitzJohn FitzGerald, 13th Earl of Desmond.

Cormac had a brother Teige, who was ancestor of the MacCarthys of Insirahell near Crookstown, County Cork, and two sisters Julia and Grainé.

Family tree

Cormac MacDermot MacCarthy with wife, parents, and other selected relatives. (Note: This family tree is based on a tree of the Lords of Muskerry, a tree focused on his grandson Donough and on genealogies of the Earls of Clancarty, the MacCarthy of Muskerry family, the Earls of Thomond, and the Earls of Ormond. Also see the list of his children and the mention about his siblings.)

Cormac; Oge Laidir; 10th Lord; 1447–1536	Catherine; Barry
Teige; 11th Lord; 1472–1565	Callaghan; 12th Lord
Dermot; 13th Lord; 1501–1570	Ellen; FitzGerald	Cormac; 14th Lord d. 1583 tanist	Callaghan; 15th Lord tanist resigned 1584
Donogh; O'Brien; 4th Earl; Thomond d. 1624	Cormac; MacDermot; 16th Lord; 1552–1616	Mary; Butler	David Roche; 7th Viscount; Fermoy; 1573–1635
Margaret; O'Brien d. c. 1599	Charles; 1st Viscount; 1564–1641	Ellen; Roche
Donough; 1st Earl; 1594–1665	Eleanor; Butler; 1612–1682

Legend

XXX	Subject of the article	XXX	Lords & Viscounts Muskerry & Earls of Clancarty

XXX	Earls of Thomond	XXX	Viscounts; Fermoy

=== Religion ===
Cormac MacDermot MacCarthy, conformed to the established religion by adhering to the Church of Ireland. His father had done the same. His son Charles studied at Oxford where Catholics were not accepted, but later became a Catholic.

== Marriage and children ==
Cormac MacDermot married Mary Butler, a daughter of Theobald Butler, 1st Baron Cahir. His wife's family, the Butler Dynasty, was Old English and descended from Theobald Walter, who had been appointed Chief Butler of Ireland by King Henry II in 1177.

Dermot and Mary had three sons:

1. Charles (died 1641), his successor
2. Teige, ancestor of the MacCarthys of Aglish
3. Donal (or Daniel) who built the castle of Carrignavar

—and one daughter:

1. Julia, married first David de Barry, 5th Viscount Buttevant as his second wife, and secondly Dermod O'Shaugnessy of Gort

== 16th Lord ==
His father died in 1570 when Cormac MacDermot was about 18 years old. According to English Common Law he would have immediately succeeded as 14th Lord of Muskerry, but as a minor his estate would have been sequestered by the crown and he would have become a ward. However, Brehon law was applied and his uncle Sir Cormac MacTeige MacCarthy succeeded in his stead, according to tanistry. When this uncle died in 1583, another of his uncles, Callaghan, took his place as the 15th Lord, but resigned in 1584 when Cormac MacDermot eventually succeeded as 16th Lord of Muskerry.

== House of Lords ==
Being Lord of Muskerry did of course not include the right to sit in the House of Lords. It was therefore by a special favour that he sat in the House of Lords of the Parliament 1585–1586 as baron Blarney. The year is given as 1578 and is quite certainly wrong: no Irish parliament sat in 1578. The year 1578 is midway between 1571 and 1585. Elizabeth's second Irish parliament sat 1569–1571 and her third 1585–1586.

== Tyrone's Rebellion ==
After the Spanish under Don Juan del Águila had landed at Kinsale on 2 October 1601, MacCarthy fought on the English side at the Siege of Kinsale during Tyrone's Rebellion. On 21 October 1601 he attacked the Spanish positions with his Irish forces fighting under George Carew, Lord President of Munster.

However, Carew suspected that MacCarthy was in contact with the enemy and about to surrender Blarney Castle to them. On 18 August 1602 he arrested MacCarthy and held him at Dublin Castle.

In 1614 Sir Lord Deputy Chichester granted him the Kilcrea Friary, which had been founded in 1645 by his ancestor Cormac Laidir MacCarthy, 9th Lord of Muskerry. Chichester specified that the friars should not be allowed to live in it and that the lands should only be let to Protestant tenants. MacCarthy was a Protestant at that time.

== Death, succession, and timeline ==
Muskerry died on 23 February 1616 at Blarney. He was buried in Kilcrea Friary, which probably implied that he became a Catholic late in his life. He was succeeded by his eldest son Charles as the 17th Lord of Muskerry, who would become Baron Blarney and Viscount Muskerry in 1628.

Timeline
As only the year, but not the month and day, of his birth is known, his age could be a year younger than given.
Age	Date	Event
0	1552	Born
0–1	1553, 6 Jul	Accession of Queen Mary I, succeeding Edward VI
5–6	1558, 17 Nov	Accession of Queen Elizabeth I, succeeding Queen Mary I
10–11	1563, about	Married Mary Butler
17–18	1570, about	Eldest son Cormac born (Note: The major genealogical sources do not give a year of birth. One source gives 1564, but this is hard to believe as his father was born in 1552.)
17–18	1570	Father died and was succeeded by his tanist, Cormac MacDermot's uncle Cormac MacCarthy
31–32	1584	Succeeded as the 16th Lord of Muskerry
37–38	1590	Son married Margaret O'Brien
41–42	1594	Grandson Donough born
46–47	1599	Son remarried to Ellen, widow of Donnell MacCarthy Reagh and daughter of the 7th Viscount Fermoy
48–49	1601, 22 Sep	The Spanish landed at Kinsale
46–47	1601, 21 Oct	Attacked the Spanish at the siege of Kinsale.
50–51	1603, 24 Mar	Accession of King James I, succeeding Queen Elizabeth I
63–64	1616, 23 Feb	Died

== Notes and references ==
=== Sources ===
- Burke, Bernard (1866). A Genealogical History of the Dormant, Abeyant, Forfeited and Extinct Peerages of the British Empire (New ed.). London: Harrison. OCLC 11501348. – (for MacCarty)
- Burke, Bernard; Burke, Ashworth Peter (1909). A Genealogical and Heraldic History of the Peerage and Baronetage, the Privy Council, Knightage and Companionage (71st ed.). London: Harrison. OCLC 28297274. – (for Ormond)
- Burke, John (1835). A Genealogic and Heraldic History of the Commoners of Great Britain and Ireland, Enjoying Territorial Possessions or High Official Rank. Vol. II. London: Henry Colburn. OCLC 13131620. (for McCarty of Carrignavar)
- Butler, William F. T. (1925). Gleanings from Irish History. London: Longmans, Green and Co. OCLC 557681240.
- Canny, Nicholas (2001). Making Ireland British 1580–1650. Oxford: Oxford University Press. ISBN 019-820091-9.
- Clavin, Terry (October 2009). "MacCarthy, Sir Cormac mac Dermond". Dictionary of Irish Biography.
- Cokayne, George Edward (1893). Complete peerage of England, Scotland, Ireland, Great Britain and the United Kingdom, extant, extinct, or dormant. Vol. V (1st ed.). London: George Bell and Sons. OCLC 1180836840. – L to M (for Muskerry)
- Cokayne, George Edward (1896). Complete Peerage of England, Scotland, Ireland, Great Britain and the United Kingdom, Extant, Extinct, or Dormant. Vol. VII (1st ed.). London: George Bell and Sons. OCLC 1180891114. – S to T (for Strafford and Thomond)
- Cokayne, George Edward (1913). Gibbs, Vicary (ed.). The complete peerage of England, Scotland, Ireland, Great Britain and the United Kingdom, extant, extinct, or dormant. Vol. III (2nd ed.). London: St Catherine Press. OCLC 228661424. – Canonteign to Cutts (for Clancarty)
- Cronnelly, Richard Francis (1865). Irish Family History. Being an Historical and Genealogical Account of the Gaedhals from the Earliest Period to the Present Time; Compiled from Authentic Sources. Vol. I. Dublin: N. H. Tallon and Company. – (Preview)
- Debrett, John (1828). Peerage of the United Kingdom of Great Britain and Ireland. Vol. II (17th ed.). London: F. C. and J. Rivington. OCLC 54499602. – Scotland and Ireland
- Dunlop, Robert; Cunningham, Bernadette (2004). "Roche, David, seventh viscount Roche of Fermoy (1573?–1635)". In Matthew, Colin; Harrison, Brian (eds.). Oxford Dictionary of National Biography. Vol. 47. New York: Oxford University Press. pp. 460–461. ISBN 0-19-861397-0.
- Fryde, E. B.; Greenway, D. E.; Porter, S.; Roy, I., eds. (1986). Handbook of British Chronology. Royal Historical Society Guides and Handbooks, No. 2 (3rd ed.). London: Offices of the Royal Historical Society. ISBN 0-86193-106-8. – (for timeline)
- Gibson, Charles Bernard (1861). The History of the County and City of Cork. Vol. I. London: Thomas C. Newby. OCLC 1046580159. – to 1603
- Gillman, Herbert Webb (1892a). "Sir Cormac MacTeige MacCarthy and the Sept Lands of Muskerry" (PDF). Journal of the Cork Historical and Archaeological Society. 1 (10): 193–200.
- Gillman, Herbert Webb (1892b). "Historical Pedigree 1380 to 1641 A.D., of MacCarthys, Lord of Muskerry, Co. Cork" (PDF). Journal of the Cork Historical and Archaeological Society. 1 (10). fold-out.
- Hunter-Blair, D. O. (1913). "Oxford, University of". In Herbermann, Charles George (ed.). Catholic Encyclopedia. Vol. XI. New York: The Encyclopedia Press. p. 365. OCLC 1157968788.
- Joyce, Patrick Weston (1903). A Concise History of Ireland from the Earliest Times to 1837 (12th ed.). Dublin: M. H. Gill & Son. OCLC 815623752.
- Keating, Geoffrey (1723). The General History of Ireland. Translated by O'Çonnor, Dermot. London: J. Bettenham. OCLC 1264766847.
- Lainé, P. Louis (1836). "Mac-Carthy". Archives généalogiques et historiques de la noblesse de France [Genealogical and Historical Archives of the Nobility of France] (in French). Vol. Tome cinquième. Paris: Imprimerie de Bethune et Plon. pp. 1–102. OCLC 865941166.
- McCarthy, Samuel Trant (1913). "The Clann Carthaigh (continued)". Kerry Archaeological Magazine. 2 (10): 53–74. doi:10.2307/30059665. JSTOR 30059665.
- McGurk, J. J. N. (2004). "Barry, David fitz James, de facto third Viscount Buttevant (1550–1617)". In Matthew, Henry Colin Gray; Harrison, Brian (eds.). Oxford Dictionary of National Biography. Vol. 4. New York: Oxford University Press. p. 121. ISBN 0-19-861354-7.
- McCarthy, Samuel Trant (1922). The MacCarthys of Munster. Dundalk: The Dundalgan Press. OCLC 1157128759.
- Meehan, Rev. Charles Patrick (1870). The Rise and Fall of the Irish Franciscan Monasteries (3rd ed.). Dublin: James Duffy.
- O'Hart, John (1892). Irish Pedigrees: Or, the Origin and Stem of the Irish Nation. Vol. I (5th ed.). Dublin: James Duffy & Co. OCLC 7239210. – Irish stem
- Ohlmeyer, Jane H. (2004). "MacCarthy, Donough, first earl of Clancarty (1594–1665)". In Matthew, Colin; Harrison, Brian (eds.). Oxford Dictionary of National Biography. Vol. 35. New York: Oxford University Press. pp. 107–108. ISBN 0-19-861385-7.
- Smith, Charles (1893) [1st pub. 1750]. The Ancient and Present State of the County and City of Cork. Vol. II. Cork: Guy and Co. OCLC 559463963. – History
- Stafford, Thomas (1896) [1st pub. 1633]. O'Grady, Standish (ed.). Pacata Hibernia. Vol. II. London: Downey and Co. OCLC 4313009. – 1601 to 1602
- Windele, John (1839). Historical and Descriptive Notices of the City of Cork and its Vicinity. Cork: Luke H. Bolster. OCLC 20432940.
- Webb, Alfred (1878). "MacCarty, Sir Cormac". Compendium of Irish Biography. Dublin: M. H. Gill & Son. p. 303, left column. OCLC 122693688.

Peerage of Ireland
Preceded by Callaghan MacTeighe MacCarthy	Lord of Muskerry; 1584–1616	Succeeded by Charles, 1st Viscount Muskerry
