= Cormac Laidir Oge MacCarthy, 10th Lord of Muskerry =

Irish chieftain (1447–1536)

Cormac Oge Laidir MacCarthy
- Lord of Muskerry
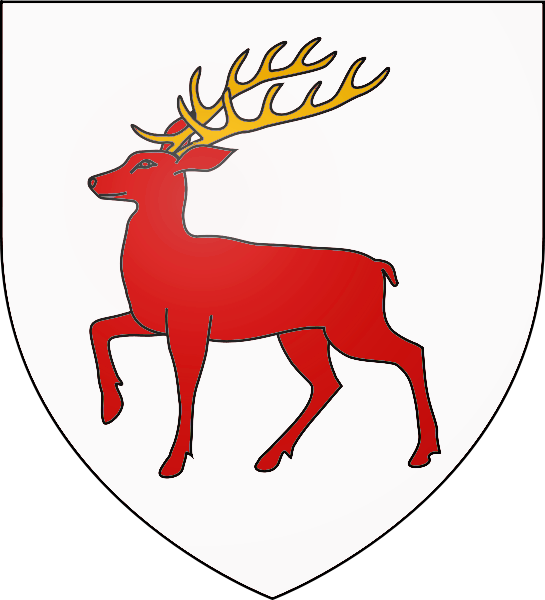
- Tenure: 1494–1536
- Successor: Teige, 11th Lord of Muskerry
- Born: 1447
- Died: 1536 (aged 88–89)
- Buried: Kilcrea Friary
- Spouse: Catherine Barry
- Issue Detail: Teige & others
- Father: Cormac Laidir, 9th Lord of Muskerry

Cormac Oge Laidir MacCarthy, 10th Lord of Muskerry (1447–1536) was an Irish chieftain, styled Lord of Muskerry. In 1520 he defeated James FitzGerald, 10th Earl of Desmond in the battle of Mourne Abbey.

== Birth and origins ==
Family tree

Cormac Laidir MacCarty with wife, parents, and other selected relatives. (Note: This family tree is based on a tree of the Lords of Muskerry, and on genealogies of the MacCarthys of Muskerry family. Also see the list of children in the text.)

Cormac; 2nd Lord d. 1374
Teige; 6th Lord; 1380–1448	Owen; 7th Lord	Cormac; 8th Lord
Cormac; Laidir; 9th Lord; 1411–1494	Mary; Fitzmaurice	Owen; MacCarthy d. 1498
Cormac Oge; Laidir; 10th Lord; 1447–1536	Catherine; Barry
Teige; 11th Lord; 1472–1565	Callaghan; 12th Lord	Mary d. 1548	James; 12th Earl d. 1540; Court Page
Dermot; 13th Lord; 1501–1570	Ellen; FitzGerald	Cormac; 14th Lord d. 1583 tanist	Callaghan; 15th Lord tanist resigned 1584
Cormac; MacDermot; 16th Lord; 1552–1616

Legend

XXX	Subject of the article	XXX	Lords & Viscounts Muskerry & Earls of Clancarty	XXX	Earls of Desmond

Cormac was born in 1447, most likely at Kilcrea Castle, residence of his parents. He was the son of Cormac Laidir MacCarthy and his wife Mary Fitzmaurice. His father was the 9th Lord of Muskerry. His father's family were the MacCarthys of Muskerry, a Gaelic Irish dynasty that had branched from the MacCarthy-Mor line in the 14th century when a younger son received Muskerry as appanage.

His mother was a daughter of Edmund Fitzmaurice, 8th Baron of Kerry, also called Baron Lixnaw instead of Baron Kerry.

== Marriage and children ==
MacCarthy married Catherine, daughter of John Barry, 1st Viscount Buttevant.

Cormac and Catherine had five sons:

1. Teige (1472–1565), his successor
2. Diarmaid
3. Eoghan
4. Callaghan (Ceallachan)
5. Cormac

—and two daughters:

1. Mary, married James FitzGerald, de jure 12th Earl of Desmond, called "Court Page"
2. Julia, married three times. First Gerald Fitzmaurice, 15th Baron Kerry (died 1550), secondly Cormac na Haoine MacCarthy Reagh (1490–1567), and thirdly Edmund Butler, 1st/11th Baron Dunboyne (died 1566)

== 10th Lord of Muskerry ==
MacCarthy's father was killed in 1495 by his brother Owen, MacCarthy's uncle, who usurped the lordship. In 1498 MacCarthy, with help from Thomas FitzThomas FitzGerald, future 11th Earl of Desmond, killed Owen. The succession was however denied to him by Cormac, another uncle, for three more years until he succeeded in deposing Cormac in 1501 and eventually acceded as 10th Lord of Muskerry. These two uncles are not counted as lords of Muskerry.

== Battle of Mourne ==
In September 1520 Muskerry and Donal MacCarthy Reagh helped Thomas FitzGerald, 11th Earl of Desmond, defeat James FitzMaurice FitzGerald, 10th Earl of Desmond in the battle of Mourne. Donal MacCarthy Reagh had married Muskerry's sister Ellen.

In December, together with Piers Butler, 8th Earl of Ormond, they besieged James FitzMaurice FitzGerald, in Dungarvan.

== Death ==
Muskerry died in 1536 at Kilcrea Castle and was buried in the friary.

== Notes and references ==
=== Sources ===
- Archbold, William Arthur Jobson (1893). "MacCarthy, Cormac Laidir". In Lee, Sidney (ed.). Dictionary of National Biography. Vol. XXXIV. London: Smith, Elder, & Co. pp. 435–436. OCLC 8544105.
- Burke, Bernard (1883). A Genealogical History of the Dormant, Abeyant, Forfeited and Extinct Peerages of the British Empire (New ed.). London: Harrison. OCLC 499232768.
- Cokayne, George Edward (1916). Gibbs, Vicary (ed.). The complete peerage of England, Scotland, Ireland, Great Britain and the United Kingdom, extant, extinct, or dormant. Vol. IV (2nd ed.). London: St Catherine Press. OCLC 228661424. – Dacre to Dysart (for Dunboyne)
- Gibson, Charles Bernard (1861). The History of the County and City of Cork. Vol. I. London: Thomas C. Newby. OCLC 1046580159. – to 1603
- Gillman, Herbert Webb (1892). "Historical Pedigree 1380 to 1641 A.D., of MacCarthys, Lord of Muskerry, Co. Cork" (PDF). Journal of the Cork Historical and Archaeological Society. 1 (10). fold-out.
- Lainé, P. Louis (1836). "Mac-Carthy". Archives généalogiques et historiques de la noblesse de France [Genealogical and Historical Archives of the Nobility of France] (in French). Vol. Tome cinquième. Paris: Imprimerie de Bethune et Plon. pp. 1–102. OCLC 865941166.
- McCormack, Anthony M. (2004). "MacCarthy, Cormac Oge Laidhir". In Matthew, Colin; Harrison, Brian (eds.). Oxford Dictionary of National Biography. Vol. 35. New York: Oxford University Press. p. 102. ISBN 0-19-861385-7.
- McCormack, Anthony M. (October 2009a). "MacCarthy (Mac Carthaigh), Cormac Óg Láidir". Dictionary of Irish Biography.
- McCormack, Anthony M. (October 2009b). McGuire, James; Quinn, James (eds.). "FitzGerald, Thomas". Dictionary of Irish Biography. – "The bald", earl of Desmond
- McCormack, Anthony M. (October 2009c). McGuire, James; Quinn, James (eds.). "FitzGerald (fitz Maurice), James". Dictionary of Irish Biography. – "Court Page"
- O'Donovan, John, ed. (1856). Annals of the Kingdom of Ireland, by the four Masters, from the Earliest Period to 1606. Vol. V (2nd ed.). Dublin: Hodges, Smith & Co. OCLC 1039532722. – 1501 to 1588
- O'Hart, John (1892). Irish Pedigrees: Or, the Origin and Stem of the Irish Nation. Vol. I (5th ed.). Dublin: James Duffy & Co. OCLC 7239210. – Irish stem
- Windele, John (1839). Historical and Descriptive Notices of the City of Cork and its Vicinity. Cork: Luke H. Bolster. OCLC 20432940.
