= Blarney Castle =

Medieval stronghold in Blarney, Ireland

- Cork, Ireland
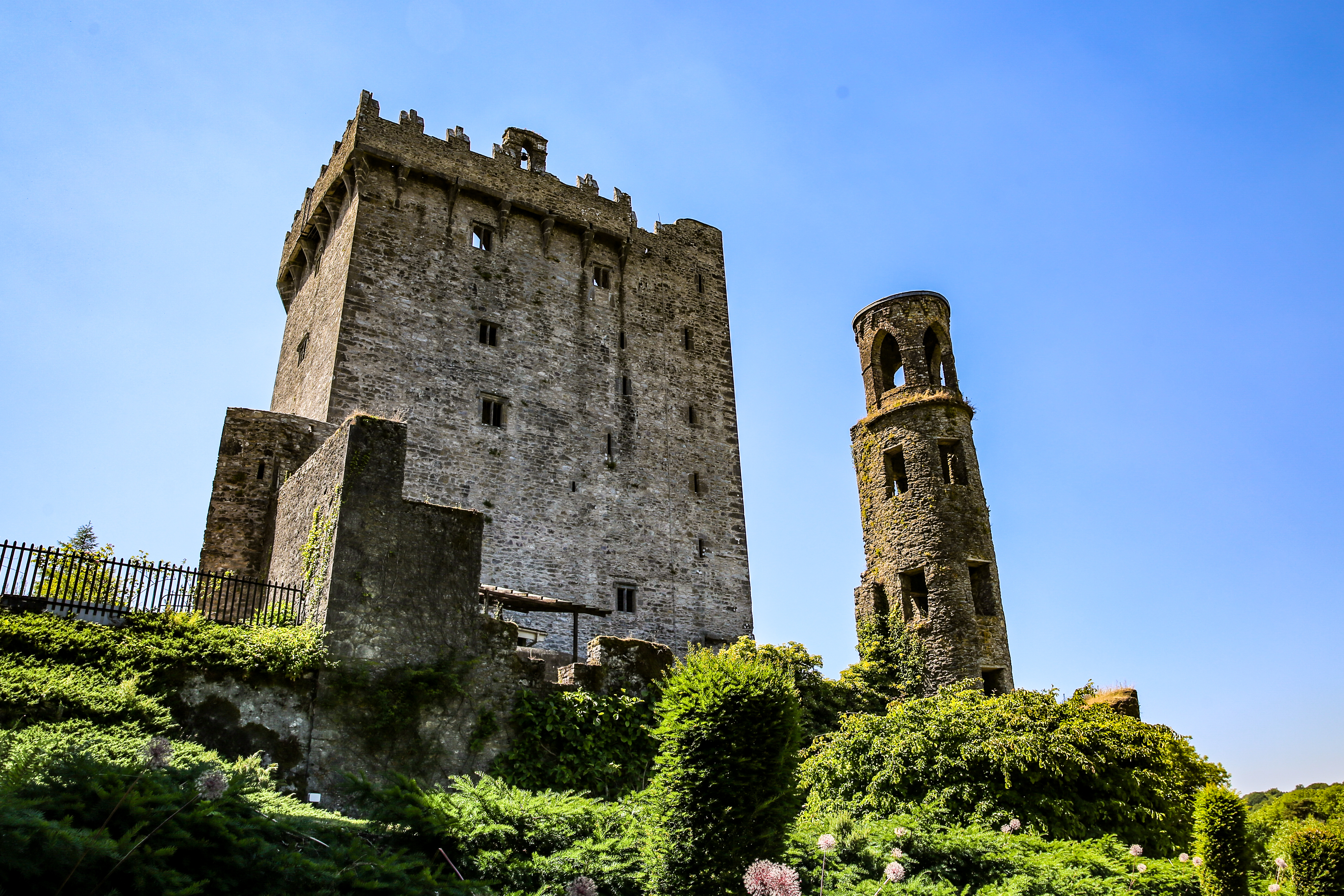
- Main castle keep and tower

Site information
- Type: Medieval castle
- Controlled by: MacCarthy family, Hollow Sword Blade Company, (Note: The Hollow Sword Blade Company (London) purchased several estates forfeited after the Williamite war) Jefferyes family, Colthurst family
- Condition: Partial ruin

Location
- Location within Ireland
- Coordinates: 51.9289°N 8.5708°W
- Height: approximately 90 ft (27 m)

Site history
- Built: 1210 (original stone structure); 1446 (current structure)
- Built by: MacCarthys of Muskerry
- Events: Desmond Rebellions, Irish Rebellion of 1641, Irish Confederate Wars, Williamite War in Ireland

Blarney Castle (Irish: Caisleán na Blarnan) is a medieval stronghold in Blarney, a town in Cork, Ireland. Though earlier fortifications were built on the same spot, the current keep was built by the MacCarthy of Muskerry dynasty, a cadet branch of the Kings of Desmond, and dates from 1446. The Blarney Stone is among the machicolations of the castle.

== History ==
=== Development ===
The castle originally dates from before 1200, when a timber house was believed to have been built on the site, although no evidence remains of this. Around 1210 this was replaced by a stone fortification. It was destroyed in 1446 but subsequently rebuilt by Cormac Láidir MacCarthy, Lord of Muscry, (Note: An inscription on a machicolation, reputedly visible in the 19th century, reportedly read "Cormac Macarthy fortis me fieri facit AD 1446") who also built castles at Kilcrea and Carrignamuck.

The castle was besieged during the Irish Confederate Wars and was seized in 1646 by Parliamentarian forces under Lord Broghill. However, after the Restoration, the castle was restored to Donough MacCarty, who was made 1st Earl of Clancarty.

During the Williamite War in Ireland in the 1690s, the 4th Earl of Clancarty (also named Donough MacCarty) was captured, and his lands (including Blarney Castle) were confiscated by the Williamites.

The castle was sold and changed hands several times—Sir Richard Pyne, the Lord Chief Justice of Ireland, owned it briefly—before being purchased in the early 18th century by Sir James Jeffreys, governor of Cork City.

=== Blarney House ===
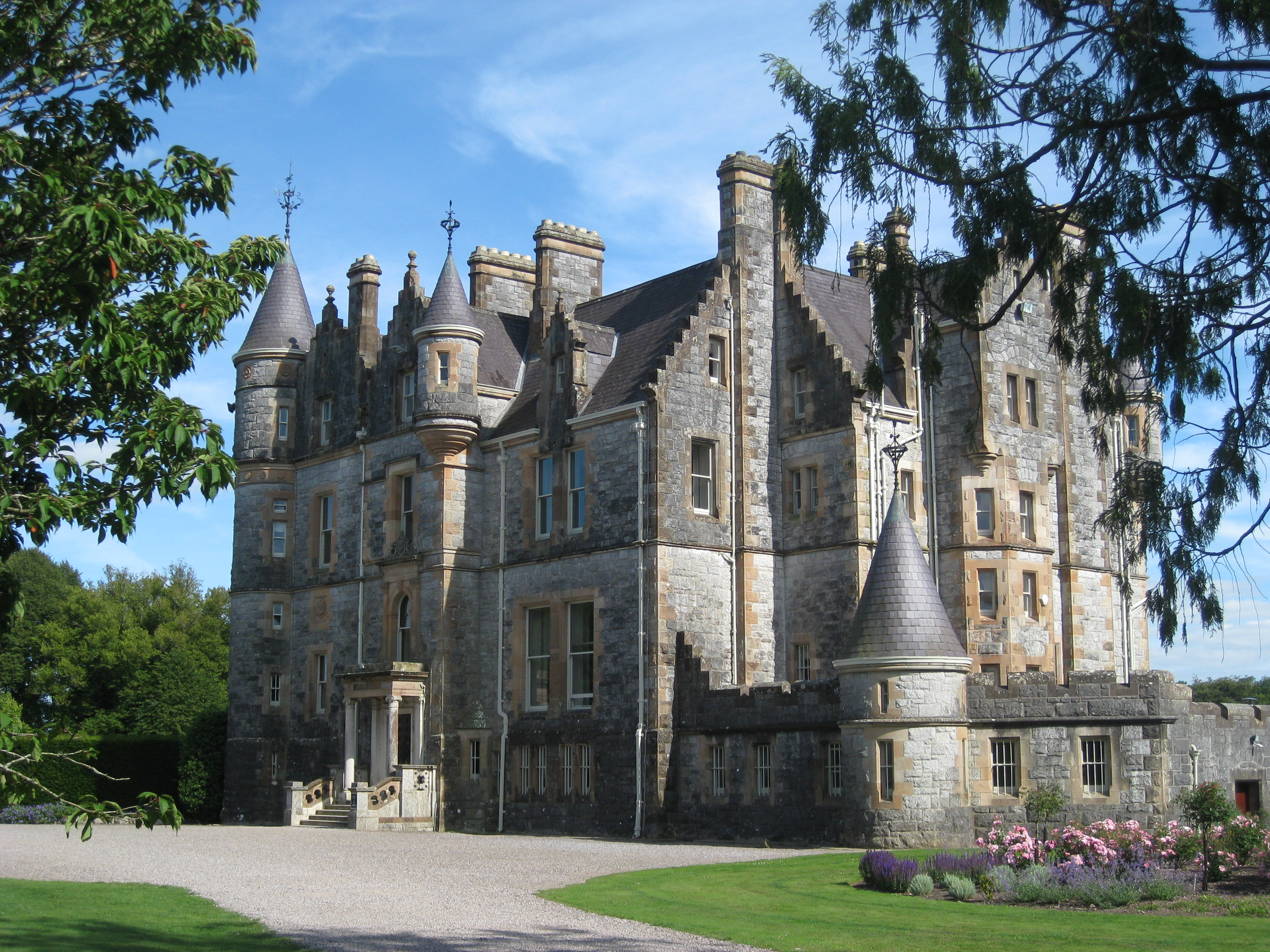
Blarney House

Members of the Jefferyes family later built a large house near the 15th-century keep. This house was destroyed by fire, and in 1874 a replacement mansion, known as Blarney House, was built overlooking the nearby lake. The house was built in a Scottish baronial style by John Lanyon of Lanyon, Lynn and Lanyon architects.

In the mid-19th century, the Jefferyes and Colthurst families were joined by marriage, and the Colthurst family still occupies the demesne. In May 2008, the present estate owner, Sir Charles St John Colthurst, Baronet, succeeded in a court action to eject a man who had lived on his land for 44 years. The man's great-grandfather had been the first to occupy the estate cottage.

== Tourism ==
Blarney Castle is now a partial ruin with some accessible rooms and battlements. At the top of the castle lies the Stone of Eloquence, better known as the Blarney Stone. Tourists visiting the castle may hang upside-down over a sheer drop to kiss the stone, which is said to give the gift of eloquence. There are many versions of the origin of the stone, including a claim that it was the Lia Fáil—a numinous stone upon which Irish kings were crowned.

Surrounding the castle are extensive gardens. There are paths touring the grounds, with signs pointing out the various attractions such as several natural rock formations with fanciful names such as Druid's Circle, Witch's Cave and the Wishing Steps. The grounds include a poison garden with numerous poisonous plants, including wolfsbane, mandrake, ricinus, opium poppies and cannabis. Blarney House is also open to the public.

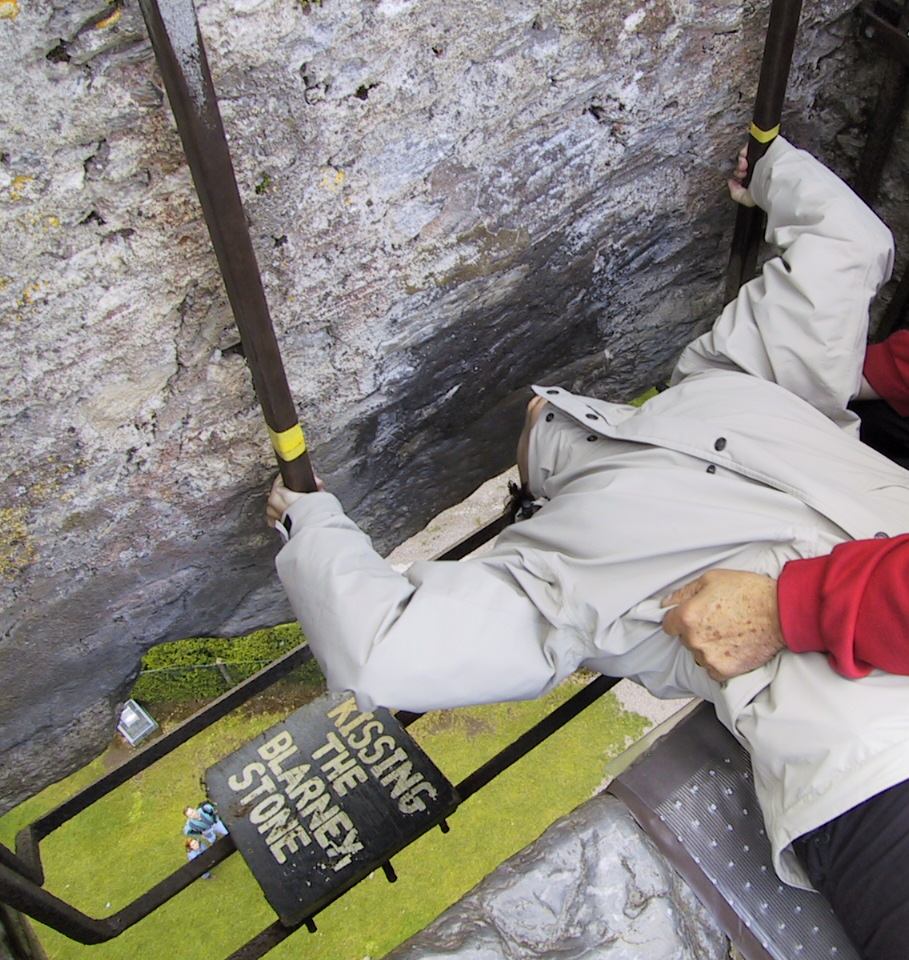
Kissing the Blarney Stone

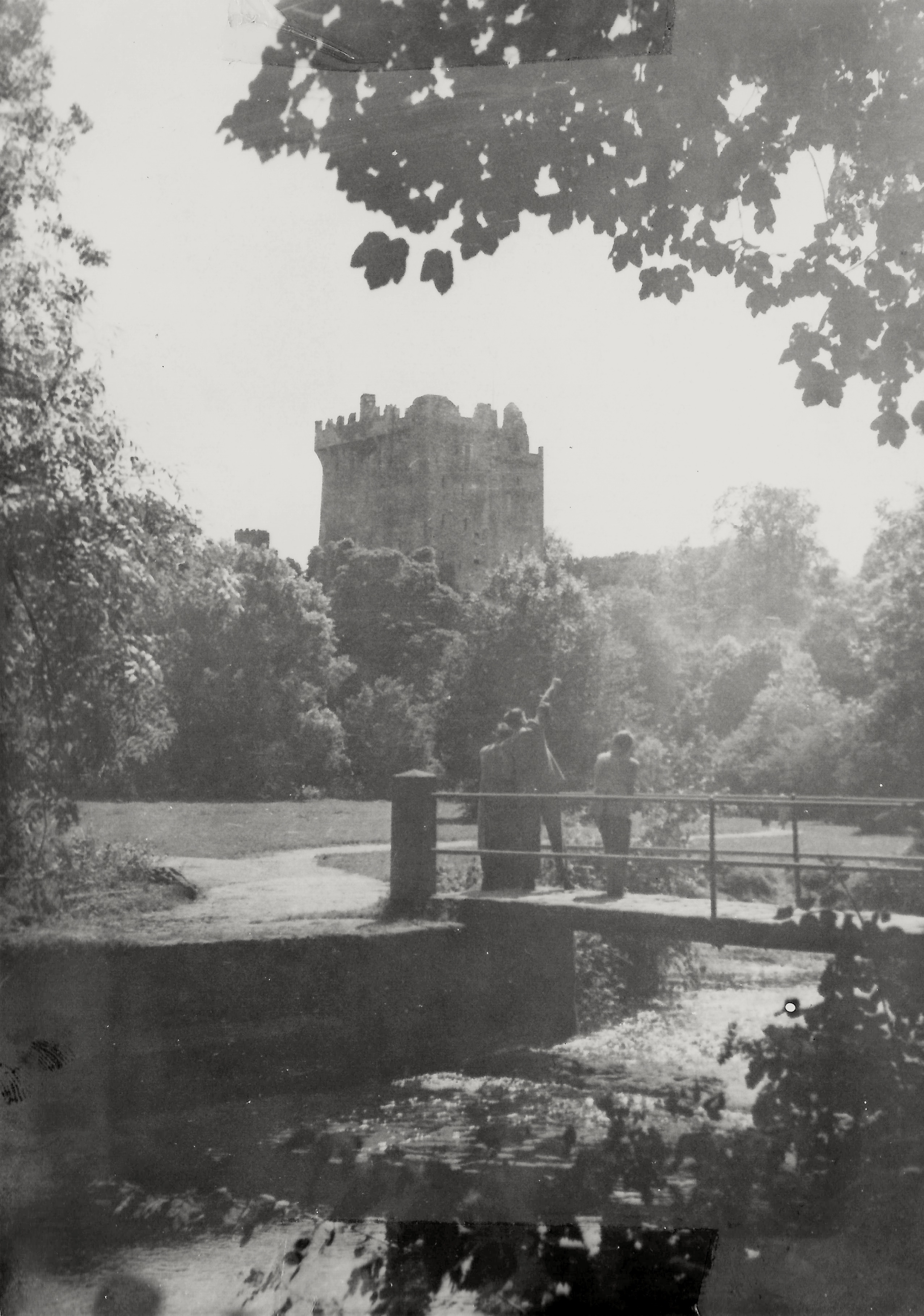
Blarney Castle, 1954

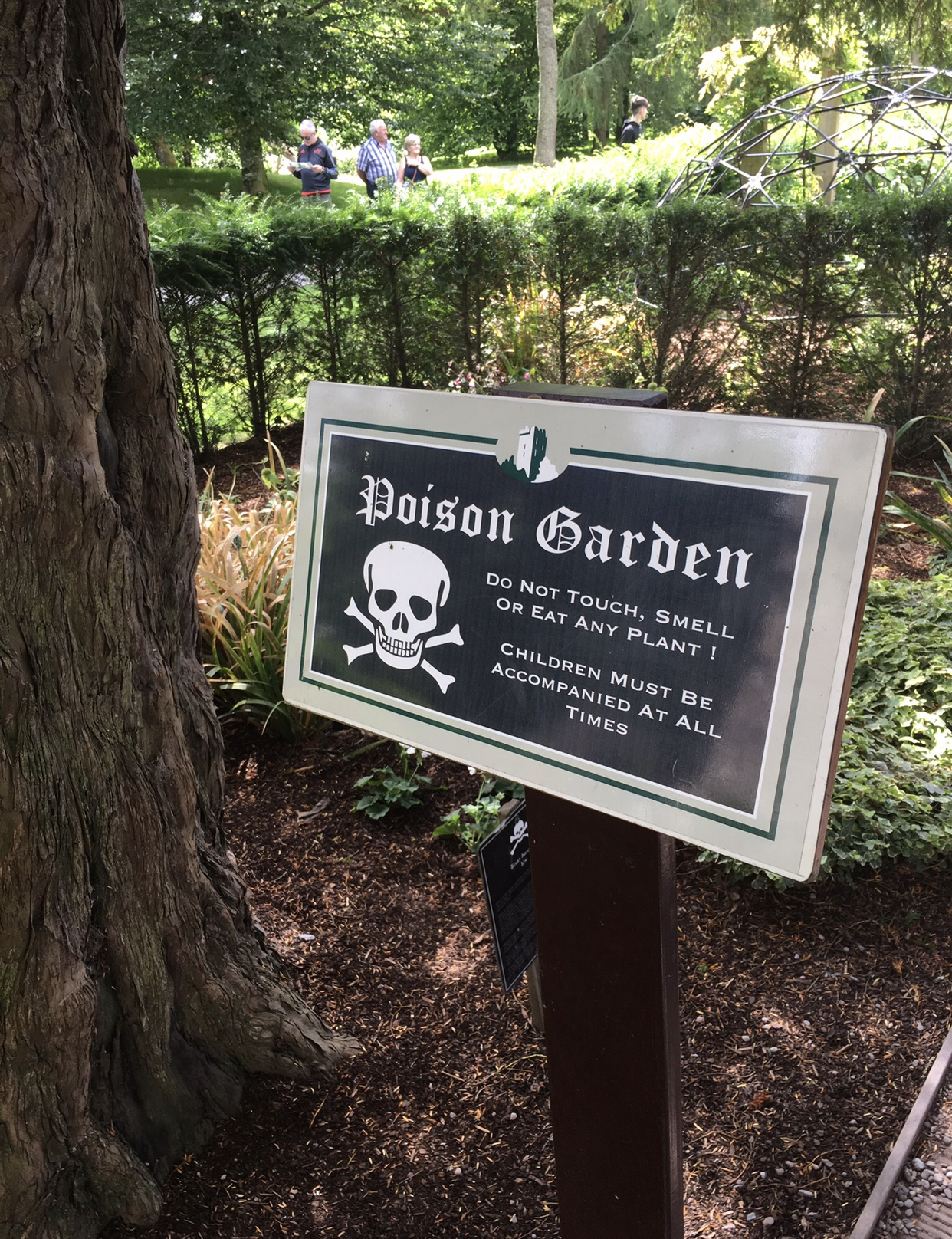
A caution sign in the poison garden on the Blarney Castle grounds.

== See also ==
- List of tourist attractions in Ireland
