= Thomas O'Herlahy =

Thomas O'Herlahy (O'Herlihy, O'Hiarlaithe) (died 1579) was the Catholic Bishop of Ross, Ireland (Rosscarbery).

His kinsman, the future Archbishop of Cashel Dermot O'Hurley, one of the most celebrated of the Irish Catholic Martyrs, is believed to have received his early education at a Cathedral school overseen by Bishop Thomas O'Herlahy, to whom he may have been given in fosterage, in the monastery founded by Saint Ailbe of Emly.

Consecrated as Bishop about 1560, he was one of three Irish bishops attending the Council of Trent. He tried to enforce its decrees, but fled with his chaplain to a small island. There he was betrayed to John Perrot, President of Munster, who sent him in chains to the Tower of London.

Simultaneously with Archbishop Richard Creagh, he was confined until released after about three years and seven months on the security of Cormac Laidir, Chief of the Name of Clan MacCarthy of Muskerry. The Bishop intended to retire to Flanders, but ill health contracted in prison induced him to return to Ireland. He was apprehended at Dublin, but released on exhibiting his discharge, and proceeded to Muskerry under The MacCarthy's protection.

Disliking the lavishness of that nobleman's hospitality, he withdrew to a small farm and lived austerely. He made a visitation of his diocese yearly, and on great festivals officiated and preached in a neighbouring church. Thus, though afflicted with dropsy, he lived until his sixtieth (or seventieth) year. He lies buried at Kilcrea Friary, County Cork.

== Sources ==
- Rothe, Analecta Nova et Mira, ed. Moran (Dublin, 1884);
- Moran, Spicilegium Ossor., I (Dublin, 1874);
- O'Reilly, Memorials of those who suffered for the Catholic Faith (London, 1868).
