= Cormac Laidir MacCarthy, 9th Lord of Muskerry =

Irish chieftain (1411–1494)

Cormac Laidir MacCarthy
- Lord of Muskerry
- Tenure: After 1448 – 1494
- Predecessor: Cormac, 8th Lord
- Successor: Cormac Oge Laidir, 10th Lord
- Born: 1411
- Died: 1494 (aged 82–83)
- Buried: Kilcrea Friary
- Spouse: Mary Fitzmaurice
- Issue Detail: Cormac & others
- Father: Teige, 6th Lord

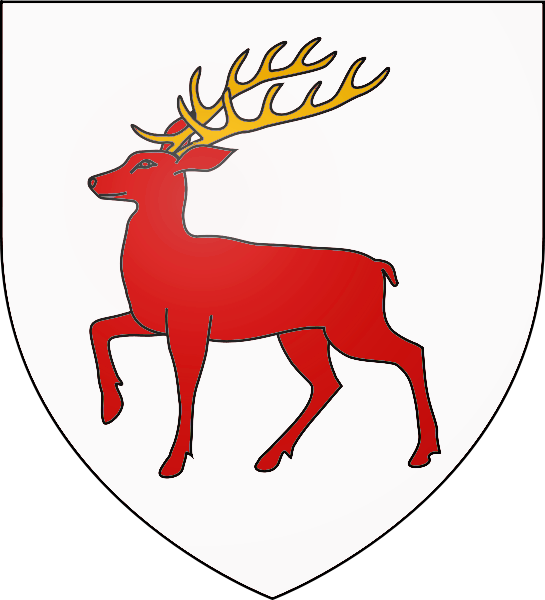
The MacCarthy Clan's Coat of arms

Cormac Laidir MacCarthy, 9th Lord of Muskerry (1411–1494), was an Irish chieftain. He founded Kilcrea Friary and built Kilcrea Castle.

Family tree

Cormac Laidir MacCarty with wife, father, and other selected relatives. (Note: This family tree is based on a tree of the Lords of Muskerry, and on genealogies of the MacCarthys of Muskerry family. Also see the lists of siblings and children in the text.)

Dermot; 1st Lord; 1310–1367
Cormac; 2nd Lord d. 1374
Teige; 6th Lord; 1380–1448	Owen; 7th Lord	Cormac; 8th Lord
Cormac; Laidir; 9th Lord; 1411–1494	Mary; Fitzmaurice	Owen; MacCarthy d. 1498
Cormac Oge; Laidir; 10th Lord; 1447–1536	Catherine; Barry
Teige; 11th Lord; 1472–1565	Callaghan; 12th Lord
Dermot; 13th Lord; 1501–1570	Ellen; FitzGerald	Cormac; 14th Lord d. 1583 tanist	Callaghan; 15th Lord tanist resigned 1584
Cormac; MacDermot; 16th Lord; 1552–1616

Legend

XXX	Subject of the article	XXX	Lords of Muskerry

== Birth and origins ==
Cormac was born in 1411, the eldest son of Teige MacCarthy. His father was the 6th Lord of Muskerry. His father's family were the MacCarthys of Muskerry, a Gaelic Irish dynasty that had branched from the MacCarthy-Mor line in the 14th century when a younger son received Muskerry as appanage. Nothing seems to be known about his mother, not even her name.

He had a younger brother Dermod, ancestor of the MacCarthys of Drishane, and a sister Ellen, married first Donal MacCarthy Reagh, Prince of Carbery, and then secondly Eoghan of Rathduane.

== Marriage and children ==
Muskerry married Mary, daughter of Edmond FitzThomas Fitzmaurice, 9th Baron Kerry (died 1498), who is also called Baron Lixnaw instead of Baron Kerry.

Cormac and Mary had at least one son:

- Cormac Oge (died 1536), his successor,

—and two daughters (birth order unknown):

- Sheila or Julia, married Thomas FitzGerald, 11th Earl of Desmond as his 1st wife
- Ellen, married Donal MacCarthy Reagh, 12th Prince of Carbery

== Later life ==
His father died in 1448 but MacCarthy did not succeed immediately. Two uncles, Owen the 7th Lord and Cormac the 8th Lord, reigned based on tanistry.

MacCarthy improved Blarney Castle by enlarging its keep. A Latin inscription on the machicolation of the added part reads "Cormac Macarthy fortis me fieri facit AD 1446", which translates into "Cormac MacCarthy the stout had me built anno domini 1446". He might also have built Carrignamuck Tower House unless that was his son. According to the legend Maccarthy discovered and enshrined the Blarney Stone.

In 1465 he founded and built Kilcrea Friary and built nearby Kilcrea Castle.

== Death ==
Muskerry died in 1494 having been killed by his brother Owen and was buried in the chancel of the church of the Kilcrea Friary. No epitaph is found there now, but earlier observers have recorded the following Latin inscription:

Hic Jacet Cormacus fil. Thadei, fil. Cormaci, fil. Dermatu magni Mc Carthy Dnus de Musgraigh Flayn ac istius conventus primus fondator, an Dom. 1494

which translates as: Here lies Cormac, son of Thadeus, son of Cormac, son of Dermot the elder, Prince of Muskerry, the initial founder of this friary, anno domini 1494. Interestingly the Latin text uses the Irish word "Flayn", "Prince", in addition to Dominus as his title.

== Notes and references ==
=== Sources ===
- Archbold, William Arthur Jobson (1893). "MacCarthy, Cormac Laidir". In Lee, Sidney (ed.). Dictionary of National Biography. Vol. XXXIV. London: Smith, Elder, & Co. pp. 435–436. OCLC 8544105.
- Gibson, Charles Bernard (1861). The History of the County and City of Cork. Vol. I. London: Thomas C. Newby. OCLC 1046580159. – to 1603
- Gillman, Herbert Webb (1892). "Historical Pedigree 1380 to 1641 A.D., of MacCarthys, Lord of Muskerry, Co. Cork" (PDF). Journal of the Cork Historical and Archaeological Society. 1 (10). fold-out.
- Lainé, P. Louis (1836). "Mac-Carthy". Archives généalogiques et historiques de la noblesse de France [Genealogical and Historical Archives of the Nobility of France] (in French). Vol. Tome cinquième. Paris: Imprimerie de Bethune et Plon. pp. 1–102. OCLC 865941166.
- Lodge, John (1789). Archdall, Mervyn (ed.). The Peerage of Ireland or, A Genealogical History of the Present Nobility of that Kingdom. Vol. II. Dublin: James Moore. OCLC 264906028. – Earls (for Earl of Kerry)
- McCormack, Anthony M. (October 2009a). "MacCarthy (Mac Carthaigh), Cormac Óg Láidir". Dictionary of Irish Biography.
- McCormack, Anthony M. (October 2009b). McGuire, James; Quinn, James (eds.). "FitzGerald, Thomas". Dictionary of Irish Biography. – "The bald", earl of Desmond
- O'Donovan, John, ed. (1856). Annals of the Kingdom of Ireland, by the four Masters, from the Earliest Period to 1606. Vol. IV (2nd ed.). Dublin: Hodges, Smith & Co. OCLC 1039472242. – 1373 to 1500
- O'Hart, John (1892). Irish Pedigrees: Or, the Origin and Stem of the Irish Nation. Vol. I (5th ed.). Dublin: James Duffy & Co. OCLC 7239210. – Irish stem
- Westropp, Thomas Johnson (1908). "The Monastery of St. Brigid, Kilcrea, and the Castle of the MacCarthys" (PDF). Journal of the Cork Historical and Archaeological Society. 14 (80): 157–177.
- Windele, John (1839). Historical and Descriptive Notices of the City of Cork and its Vicinity. Cork: Luke H. Bolster. OCLC 20432940.
- Woods, Cecil Crawford (1896). "Blarney Castle, County Cork, Double Structure of its Keep" (PDF). Journal of the Cork Historical and Archaeological Society. 2 (20): 337–344.
