= Éamonn de Bhál =

Éamonn de Bhál (fl. early 19th century) was an Irish poet.

A native of County Cork, de Bhál was a native Irish speaker, scribe and poet. He played an important role in the recording and preservation of Eibhlín Dubh Ní Chonaill's Caoineadh Airt Uí Laoghaire, which he obtained from Sean nos singer Nóra Ní Shíndile.

Copies of his work are held in the National Library of Ireland.
