= Cormac MacCarthy Mor, King of Desmond =

Irish king ()1271–1359

Cormac MacCarthy Mor
- King of Desmond
- Reign: 1326–1359
- Predecessor: Dermot MacCarthy Mor
- Successor: Donal Og MacCarthy Mor
- Born: 1271
- Died: 1359 (aged 87–88)
- Issue Detail: Donal Og; Dermot MacCarthy, Lord of Muskerry; & others
- Father: Donal MacCarthy

Cormac MacCarthy Mor (1271–1359) was a King of Desmond.

== Birth and origins ==
Cormac was born in 1271, probably the third son of Donal Og MacCarthy who died in 1306.

Family tree

Cormac MacCarty Mor with father, some sons, and other selected relatives. (Note: This family tree is based on the genealogies of the MacCarthy Mor and the MacCarthys of Muskerry. Also see the list of children in the text.)

Donal d. 1302
Donal Og d. 1306	Donogh d. 1310
Dermot d. 1326	Cormac; 1271–1359
Donal Og d. 1391	Dermot; 1st Lord; 1340–1381
Tadh na Mainistreach; 1340–1413	Cormac; 2nd Lord d. 1374

Legend

XXX	Subject of the article	XXX	Kings of Desmond	XXX	Lords of Muskerry

== Children ==
MacCarthy had at least three sons. Two of them are quite well known:

- Donal Og MacCarthy Mor (Domhnall Óg Mac Carthaigh Mór) (died 1391), his successor
- Dermot MacCarthy (Diarmaid Mac Carthaigh) (1340–1381), the first Lord of Muskerry

== Notes, citations, and sources ==
=== Sources ===
- O'Byrne, Emmett (October 2009a). McGuire, James; Quinn, James (eds.). "MacCarthy Mór (Mac Carthaig Mór), Cormac". Dictionary of Irish Biography.
- O'Byrne, Emmett (October 2009b). McGuire, James; Quinn, James (eds.). "MacCarthy Mór (Mac Carthaig Mór), Domhnail Óg". Dictionary of Irish Biography.
- O'Hart, John (1892). Irish Pedigrees: Or, the Origin and Stem of the Irish Nation. Vol. I (5th ed.). Dublin: James Duffy & Co. OCLC 7239210. – Irish stem
