= Dermot MacCarthy, 1st Lord of Muskerry =

14th-century Irish Lord

Dermot MacCarthy
- Lord of Muskerry
- Tenure: 1353–1367
- Successor: Cormac MacCarthy, 2nd Lord of Muskerry
- Born: 1310 or 1340
- Died: 1367, 1368, or 1386
- Issue Detail: Cormac, Felim, Donough & others
- Father: Cormac MacCarthy Mor, King of Desmond

Dermot MacCarthy (1310–1367) was the 1st Lord of Muskerry. He was an Irish magnate who owned extensive lands in central Munster. He was the first of the long line of the MacCarthy of Muskerry dynasty.

== Birth and origins ==
Dermot was born in 1310 or 1340, second son of Cormac MacCarthy Mor, King of Desmond.

Family tree

Dermot MacCarty with father, son, and other selected relatives. (Note: This family tree is based on a tree and corresponding written genealogies of the MacCarthy Mor and on genealogies of the MacCarthys of Muskerry, as well as on a tree of the Lords of Muskerry. Also see the list of children in the text.)

Donal Og d. 1306
Dermot d. 1326	Cormac; 1271–1359
Donal Og d. 1391	Dermot; 1st Lord; 1310–1367
Tadh na Mainistreach; 1340–1413	Cormac; 2nd Lord d. 1374
Donal; Dana d. 1469	Teige; 6th Lord; 1380–1448	Cormac; 7th Lord	Owen; 8th Lord
Teige; Liath; 1407–1490	Cormac; Laidir; 9th Lord; 1411–1494	Mary; Fitzmaurice

Legend

XXX	Subject of the article	XXX	Lords of Muskerry	XXX	Kings of Desmond

== Children ==
MacCarthy had at least three sons:

- Cormac (d. 1374), 2nd Lord of Muskerry
- Felim
- Donough

== Later life and death ==
MacCarthy was granted the Muskerry area as appanage in 1353 and received the English title Lord of Muskerry.

He died a violent death in 1367, 1368 or 1381, killed by the O'Mahonys or by his uncle Fitzmaurice. He died in 1381 or in 1367, killed by the O'Mahonys. Otherwise, he was killed by his maternal uncle Lord Fitzmaurice in 1368. He is the founder of the MacCarthy of Muskerry dynasty. He was probably succeeded by his eldest son Cormac as the 2nd Lord. His grandson Teige was the 6th Lord, but the 3rd, 4th and 5th lords are not known by name and might have succeeded by primogeniture or might have been chosen by tanistry.

== Notes, citations, and sources ==
=== Sources ===
- Gillman, Herbert Webb (1892). "Historical Pedigree 1380 to 1641 A.D., of MacCarthys, Lord of Muskerry, Co. Cork" (PDF). Journal of the Cork Historical and Archaeological Society. 1 (10). fold-out.
- Lainé, P. Louis (1836). "Mac-Carthy". Archives généalogiques et historiques de la noblesse de France [Genealogical and Historical Archives of the Nobility of France] (in French). Vol. Tome cinquième. Paris: Imprimerie de Bethune et Plon. pp. 1–102. OCLC 865941166.
- McCarthy, Samuel Trant (1922). The MacCarthys of Munster. Dundalk: The Dundalgan Press. OCLC 1157128759.
- O'Byrne, Emmett (October 2009). McGuire, James; Quinn, James (eds.). "MacCarthy Mór (Mac Carthaig Mór), Domhnail Óg". Dictionary of Irish Biography.
- O'Hart, John (1892). Irish Pedigrees: Or, the Origin and Stem of the Irish Nation. Vol. I (5th ed.). Dublin: James Duffy & Co. OCLC 7239210. – Irish stem

Peerage of Ireland
New creation	Lord of Muskerry; 1353–1367	Succeeded by Cormac, MacCarthy
