= Nóra Ní Shíndile =

Irish singer

Nóra Ní Shíndile, was an Irish singer (see Keening), active in the late 1790s/early 1800s.

Ní Shíndile was a native of Millstreet, County Cork and a professional keener in the late 1790s/early 1800s. About 1800, the scribe and poet, Éamonn de Bhál, transcribed Caoineadh Airt Uí Laoghaire from her rendering, thus preserving the full version of the caoineadh for posterity.

== See also ==
- Caitilin Dubh
