= Waterloo Round Tower =

19th century bell tower in Ballygibbon, Ireland

Waterloo Tower
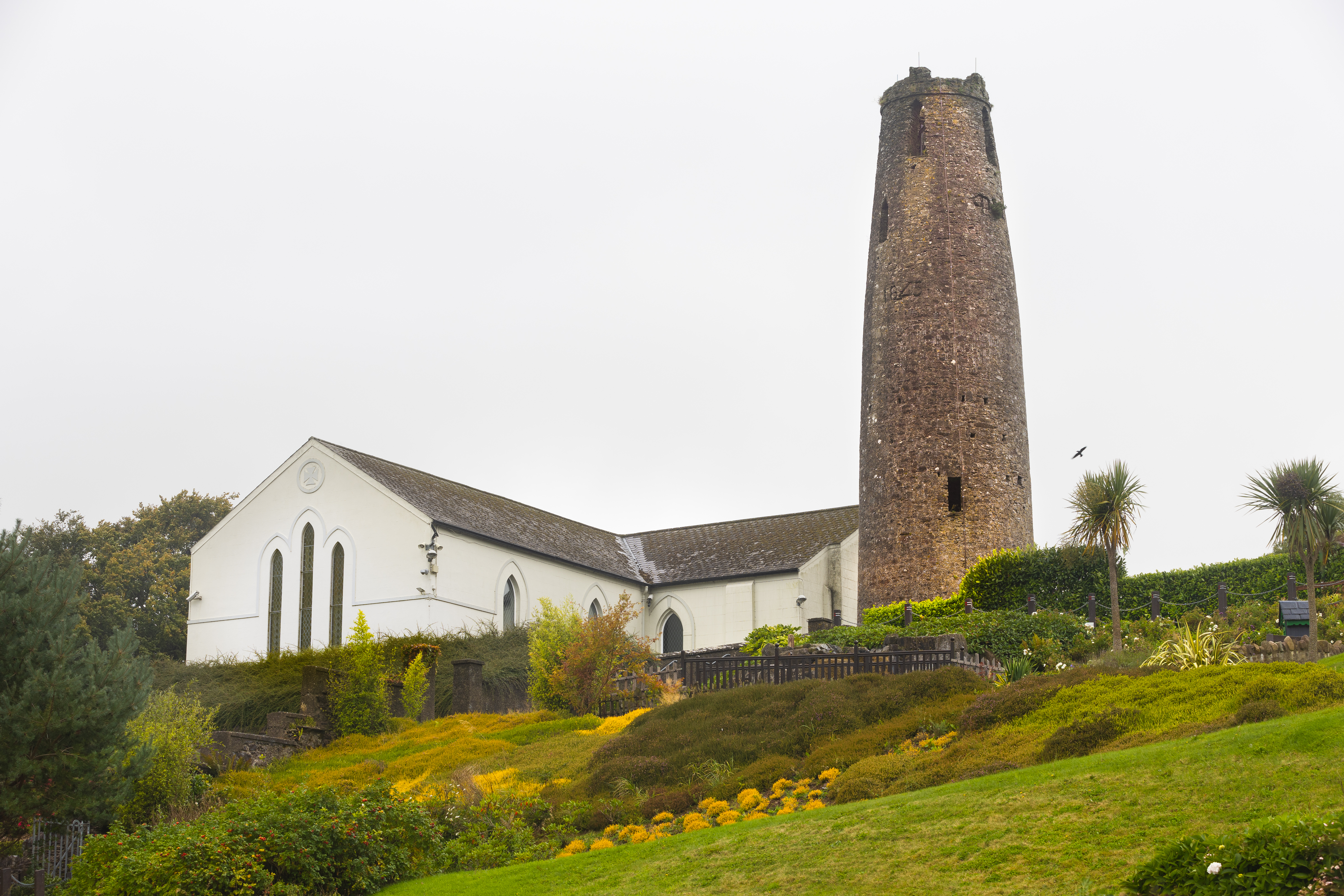
- Waterloo Round Tower next to St. Mary's church
- Interactive map of Waterloo Tower
- Location: Waterloo village in Ballygibbon townland, co. Cork, Ireland
- Coordinates: 51.95498°N 08.57451°W
- Designer: John Windele
- Type: bell tower
- Material: rumble stone, limestone
- Beginning date: July 24, 1836
- Completion date: 1843
- Restored date: August 2009
- Record of Monuments and Places catalogue no. RMP CO062-200002-

The Waterloo Round Tower is a folly bell tower in Waterloo village in Ballygibbon townland, 2 kilometers north of Blarney in county Cork, Ireland. It is situated next to St. Mary's church on a hill, and overlooks the River Martin and the 18th-century Putland's Bridge which predates the tower. The tower was built in 1843 to resemble mediaeval round towers which are common in Ireland, but is otherwise unrelated to them.

== History ==
The foundation stone was laid on July 27, 1836 by a local parish priest, father Matt Horgan, based on the design by John Windele. The foundation was a gift to the parish by the landlord at the time, named Putland, after whom a nearby bridge is also named. Father Horgan, whose choice of the design was prompted by his studies of the origins of ancient Irish monastery towers, died in 1848 and is said to have been buried in the grounds of the church and the tower.

== Design ==
The tower narrows towards the top following a barrel shape curve, anecdotally because of the draining of funds towards the end of the construction, which earned it the moniker "Father Matt's Butterchurn". The four-stage construction is built of rubble stone, with raised entrance modelled on the mediaeval towers, small elongated window openings, two incisions ("1843" and the name "Matthew" in Gaelic script), and a belfry at the top.

== Renovation ==
In 2009, the tower was renovated at the cost of EUR 35,000, following an 18-month effort and fund rising by the local community Waterloo Renewal Group, including from Heritage Council (Ireland) grants. The bell was automated, and the area around the tower was revamped. A climbing walkway leading to the tower and a picturesque sloping garden were built. The tower was re-dedicated in August 2009 by Archbishop Dermot Clifford of Cashel. The tower is catalogued under the identification RMP CO062-200002- by the Record of Monuments and Places.
