= Saint Cyra =

Cyra (also Chera, Crea, and Cere filia Duibhrea) was an early Irish abbess. Her feast day is 16 October.

The virgin saint was abbess of the monastery of Killchere ("Cyra's Church") in that part of Munster which was called Muscragia or Muskerry. The site is now occupied by the ruins of a later Franciscan Kilcrea Friary.
