= Eibhlín Dubh Ní Chonaill =

Irish noblewoman and poet

Eibhlín Dubh Ní Chonaill (also known as Eileen O'Connell, c. 1743 – c. 1800) was a member of the Irish gentry and a poet. She was the main composer of Caoineadh Airt Uí Laoghaire, a traditional lament in Irish described (in its written form) as the greatest poem composed in either Ireland or Britain during the eighteenth century.

Ní Chonaill was a member of Muintir Chonaill of Derrynane, County Kerry, being one of ten surviving children of Dómhnaill Mór Ó Conaill and Máire Ní Dhonnchadha Dhuibh, and an aunt of Daniel O'Connell.

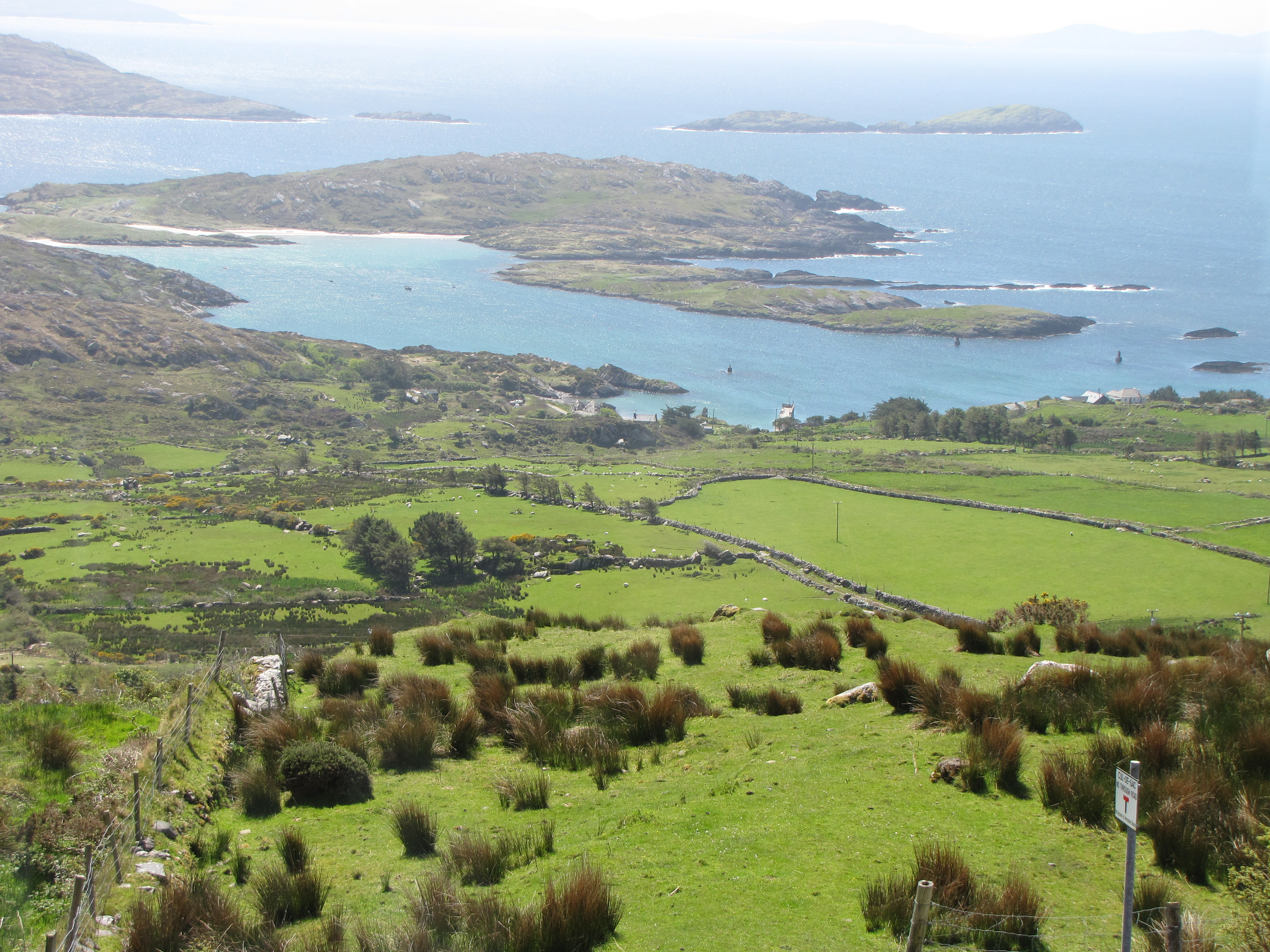
Doire Fhíonáin (Derrynane), where Eibhlín Dubh Ní Chonaill was raised.

== Life ==
Her first marriage at age fifteen was arranged by her parents. Her elderly husband died after only six months and they had no children.

In 1767 she fell in love with Captain Art Ó Laoghaire of Rathleigh, Macroom, County Cork. He had recently returned from service in the Hungarian Hussars. Eileen was 23; she had been married to "old O'Connor of Firies" when she was 15, and widowed within six months of that marriage. With the marriage against the express wishes of her family, Art and Eibhlín eloped, marrying on 19 December 1767, and settled down to life at Rathleigh where they lived with Art's father, Conchubhar Ó Laoghaire. They had five children, three of whom died in infancy. She was pregnant at the time of Art's death.

Art Ó Laoghaire (O'Leary) was a Roman Catholic, one of the few surviving Catholic gentry. The anti-Catholic Penal Laws in force in Ireland during the 18th century imposed severe restrictions on most of the population in terms of education, employment, trade, ownership of property and the practice of their religion. The wealthy resorted to private tutors and clandestine property arrangements, the poor to hedge schools, and large numbers of Irish went abroad, often to serve in foreign armies. Ó Laoghaire had been educated on Continental Europe and served as a captain in the Hungarian Hussars, a Regiment of Empress Marie Theresa's Army of Austro-Hungary.

Art had a long-running dispute with Abraham Morris (or Morrison) of Hanover Hall, who was Sheriff of Cork ("dirty treacherous Morris", "Morris ghránna an fhill"). Morris vigorously attempted to enforce the Penal Laws in personal enmity to Art, a Catholic. The dispute came to a head in 1773 when Morris offered Art five pounds for his horse; according to the Penal Laws, Catholics were proscribed from owning horses worth more than five pounds. Art refused, and went on the run. Morris was able to use his position as a Protestant, and as sheriff, to have Ó Laoghaire outlawed. A price of 20 guineas was put on his head. Once proclaimed an outlaw, he could be shot at sight legally. Ó Laoghaire attempted and failed to ambush Morris at Millstreet and soon after was shot at Carraig an Ime. His mare raced into Rathleigh, riderless, soaked in blood. Eibhlín Dubh mounted the mare and galloped back to Carraig an Ime, where she found Art's body.

== Cultural background ==
Eibhlín Dubh and her family lived in an Irish-speaking countryside, but they themselves, as gentry, spoke both Irish and English (the latter being the language of their letters). The ancient Irish custom of fosterage, whereby children of the gentry were brought up in their formative years by local farming families, with their foster sisters and brothers as constant companions thereafter, meant that Irish was as familiar to them as English. Irish was the language of their deepest emotional utterance, hence the language of mourning.

== Lament ==
The Caoineadh was composed by Eibhlín Dubh extempore with contributions from Art's father and sister, and is characteristic of an ancient tradition. It survived in the oral tradition in various versions, the two most complete being supplied by Nóra Ní Shíndile from Boolymore (An Bhuaile Mhór) in County Cork, who died in 1873 at the age of a hundred or thereabouts. It was not written down until decades after its composition. It is composed in the ancient metre called "rosc," commonly used for such laments, and incorporates traditional themes: the deceased is praised, his exploits remembered, vengeance threatened on his enemies, and he himself called back to life.

Mo chara thu is mo chuid!
A mharcaigh an chlaímh ghil,
Éirigh suas anois,
Cuir ort do chulaith
Éadaigh uasail ghlain,
Cuir ort do bhéabhar dubh,
Tarraing do lámhainní umat.
Siúd í in airde d'fhuip,
Sin í do láir amuigh.
Buailse an bóthar caol úd soir
Mar a maolóidh romhat na toir,
Mar a gcaolóidh romhat an sruth,
Mar a n-umhlóidh romhat mná is fir,
Má tá a mbéasa féin acu -
'S is baolach liomsa ná fuil anois.

(My friend and my darling! Horseman of the bright sword, rise up now, put on your spotless, noble clothes, put on your black hat, draw on your gloves. Up there hangs your whip, there outside is your mare. Travel that narrow road east where the bushes shall bend before you, where the stream will narrow before you, where women and men will bow to you, if they have their manners - though I fear they have lost them now.)

A number of Irish writers have translated the lament, including Frank O'Connor, John Montague, Thomas Kinsella and Eilis Dillon. In addition to translating the lament, Doireann Ní Ghríofa researches the life of Eibhlín Dubh Ní Chonaill in her book A Ghost in the Throat.

== Burial of Art ==
Initially Ó Laoghaire was buried by Eibhlín in the Old Cemetery of Cill na Martra (Tuath na Dromann), near to Dundareirke Castle. His family wished him to be buried in Kilcrea Friary, but burial in monastic ground was forbidden at that time under the penal laws. His body was moved temporarily to an unconsecrated field adjacent to the Friary. When it became legally possible, his final interment in the sacred grounds of Kilcrea Friary took place. Art was buried in a tomb that bears the following inscription:

Lo Arthur Leary
Generous Handsome Brave
slain in His Bloom
Lies in this Humble Grave
Died May 4th 1773 Aged 26 years.

== Aftermath of Art's death ==
On 17 May 1773, a Coroner's Inquest produced a verdict that Abraham Morris and the party of soldiers were guilty of the wilful and wanton murder of Art Ó Laoghaire.

On 17 July 1773, Ó Laoghaire's brother Conchubhar (anglicised as Cornelius) attempted to murder Abraham Morris, then fled to America. Morris recovered from the shots, but they were considered to have shortened his life. (He died in September 1775.)

On 4 September 1773, Morris submitted himself to trial by his peers, the local Magistracy, and was found innocent of any crime. Green, who fired the fatal shot, was later decorated for gallantry.
