= William Clarke & Son =

Tobacco Company in Ireland

William Clarke & Son was a tobacco company that was founded in 1830 at South Main Street, Cork, Ireland.

In January 1924, following the formation of the Irish Free State, the United Kingdom trade of William Clarke & Son was transferred to Dublin and taken over by Ogden's.
