= Caoineadh Airt Uí Laoghaire =

Irish poem

Caoineadh Airt Uí Laoghaire or the Lament for Arthur O' Leary is an Irish keen composed in the main by Eibhlín Dubh Ní Chonaill, a member of the Gaelic gentry in the 18th century, who was born in County Kerry and lived near Macroom, County Cork, after her marriage to Art. The caoineadh has been described as the greatest poem written in either Ireland or Britain during the eighteenth century.

Eibhlín composed it on the subject of the death of her husband Art on 4 May 1773. It concerns the murder at Carraig an Ime, County Cork, of Art, at the hands of the Irish MP Abraham Morris, and the aftermath. It is one of the key texts in the corpus of Irish oral literature. The poem was composed extempore and follows the rhythmic and societal conventions associated with keening and the traditional Irish wake respectively. The Caoineadh is divided into five parts composed in the main over the dead body of her husband at the time of the wake and later when Art was re-interred in Kilcrea.

Parts of the Caoineadh take the form of a verbal duel between Eibhlín and Art's sister. The acrimonious dialogue between the two women shows the disharmony between their two prominent families.

Thomas Kinsella made an English verse translation which was published in a bilingual anthology, An Duanaire - Poems of the Dispossessed: an anthology of Gaelic poems, edited by Seán Ó Tuama (Dolmen Press, Portlaoise 1981 ISBN 0-85105-363-7). Another verse translation was the work of Frank O'Connor and this was included in Brendan Kennelly's anthology The Penguin Book of Irish Verse (Harmondsworth: Penguin, 1970; pp. 78–86). Doireann Ní Ghríofa published her own translation at the end of her work “A Ghost in the Throat” (Tramp Press, 2020).

== The text ==
Traditional laments were always composed and sung extempore, sometimes by a relative, at other times by a skilled professional. They incorporated traditional themes: the deceased is praised, his exploits remembered, vengeance threatened on his enemies, and he himself called back to life. All these themes are to be found in the Caoineadh.

The greater part of the Caoineadh was composed by Eibhlín Dubh, with contributions from Art's father and sister. It survived in the oral tradition in various versions, the two most complete being supplied by Nóra Ní Shíndile from Boolymore (An Bhuaile Mhór), near Millstreet (Sráid an Mhuilinn) in County Cork, who died in 1873 in extreme old age. Ní Shíndile was a professional keener or bean caointe. The lament was transcribed by the scribe and poet Éamonn de Bhál. The musicologist Liam Ó Noraidh published two fragments of Caoineadh Airt Uí Laoghaire in 1965, including the music; the first fragment was collected from Máire Bhean Uí Chonaill in Baile Bhuirne (Ballyvourney), County Cork, in 1941, and the second from Labhras Ó Cadhlaigh, who learned it from his mother. These two fragments and traditional laments collected elsewhere in Ireland all use variants of the same melody.

Part of the text runs as follows:

Mo chara thu is mo chuid !
A mharcaigh an chlaímh ghil,
Éirigh suas anois,
Cuir ort do chulaith
Éadaigh uasail ghlain,
Cuir ort do bhéabhar dubh,
Tarraing do lámhainní umat.
Siúd í in airde t'fhuip ;
Sin í do láir amuigh.
Buail-se an bóthar caol úd soir
Mar a maolóidh romhat na toir,
Mar a gcaolóidh romhat an sruth,
Mar a n-umhlóidh romhat mná is fir,
Má tá a mbéasa féin acu—
'S is baolach liomsa ná fuil anois.

(My friend and my darling! Horseman of the bright sword, rise up now, put on your spotless, noble clothes, put on your black hat, draw on your gloves. Up there hangs your whip, there outside is your mare. Travel that narrow road east where the bushes shall bend before you, where the stream will narrow before you, where women and men will bow to you, if they have their manners - though I fear they have lost them now.)

== Literary references to the Caoineadh ==
- Professor Patricia Rubio notes the similarities between Caoineadh Airt Ui Laoghaire and Seamus Heaney's "The Burial at Thebes".
- Playwright Tom McIntyre dramatised the events, and his play won the Stewart Parker Prize in 1999.
- Hunter S. Thompson used an excerpt from the anglicized version of this poem as an epigraph to The Rum Diary:
"My rider of the bright eyes,
What happened you yesterday?
I thought you in my heart,
When I bought your fine clothes,
A man the world could not slay."
- Christopher Tin used an excerpt of this song in his debut album, Calling All Dawns.
- Dermot Bolger's 1990 play "The Lament for Authur Cleary", based on Caoineadh Airt Uí Laoghaire, was awarded the Samuel Beckett Prize.
- Poet and author Doireann Ní Ghríofa's 2020 book A Ghost in the Throat is based on the experiences of Ní Chonaill.

== Adaptations of the Caoineadh ==
Caoineadh Airt Uí Laoire (1975)
- A postmodern film adaptation in English and Irish, Dir: Bob Quinn Wri: Bob Quinn, Seosamh O'Cuaig, Mairtín MacDonncha DOP: Joe Comerford Starring: John Arden, Séan Bán Breathnach, Caitlín Ní Dhonncha

Bás Arto Leary (2012)
Dir: Luke McManus Wri: Manchán Magan DOP: Suzie Lavelle Starring: Kelly Gough, Owen McDonnell, Lochlainn O'Mearain, Aoife Nic Ardghail

== See also ==
- Nóra Ní Shíndile
- Éamonn de Bhál
