= Drishane Castle =

- Caisleán an Driseáin (Irish)
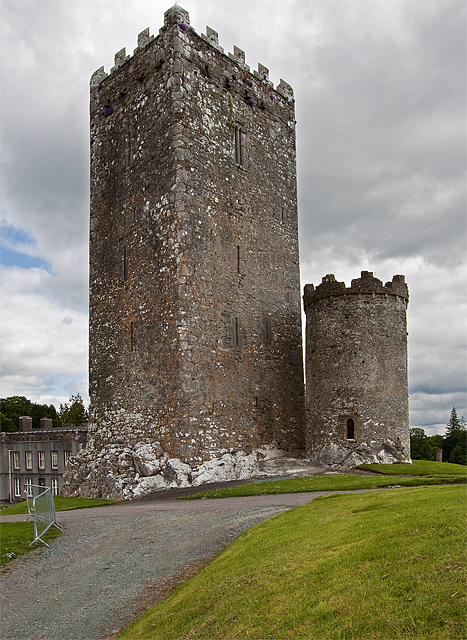

- Location within Ireland
- 52.077062°N 9.047539°W
- Type: Tower house
- Location: Drishane More, Millstreet, County Cork, Ireland

History
- Built: c. 1436–50

Site notes
- Height: 22 m (72 ft)
- Owner: Duggan family

National monument of Ireland
- Official name: Drishane Castle
- Reference no.: 296

Drishane Castle is a MacCarthy tower house and National Monument located in County Cork, Ireland. In modern times the name is also used to refer to the adjacent house which dates from the 18th century. It is located 2.2 km (1.4 mi) northeast of Millstreet, on the south bank of the Munster Blackwater.

== History ==
The tower house at Drishane was built by the MacCarthy (Mac Cárthaigh) clan c. 1436–50. It was probably begun by Dermot Mór, the second son of Tadhg (King of Desmond 1390–1428). Tadhg, son of Owen was in possession of Drishane Castle in 1592 when he surrendered it to Queen Elizabeth I and got a regrant. His son Owen (Eoin) still held the castle at his death in 1637.

All MacCarthy lands were forfeit after the Irish Confederate Wars (1641–53), but were restored to Donough MacCarty, 1st Earl of Clancarty in 1660 when Charles II regained the throne.

The MacCarthys again lost their lands after the Williamite War (1689–91). The land fell to the Hollow Sword Blade Company, who sold it to Henry Wallis in 1709; the Wallises took full ownership in 1728.

The Wallis family built the house, or castle as it came to be called, c. 1730. During the Fenian Rising of 1867, Drishane Castle was garrisoned. It remained in Wallis hands until 1882, later being owned by Patrick Stack. It became a convent in 1909, owned by the Sisters of the Infant Jesus, who operated a boarding secondary school for girls until 1992. In 1974 it was used as a location set as the fictional Brede Abbey in the film version of In This House of Brede. It was bought by the Duggan family and became a centre for asylum seekers.

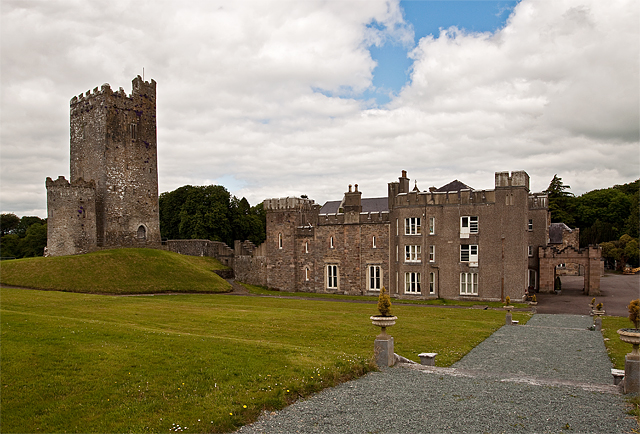
View of Drishane Castle, next to the Wallis big house.

== Tower house ==
The tower house is 22 m tall. It is built of stone with four storeys and narrow arrowslits. There are "Irish" crenellations on the roof, and a small circular tower next to the castle.
