= Art Ó Laoghaire =

Irish soldier (1746–1773)

Art (or Airt) Ó Laoghaire (Irish pronunciation: [ˈaɾˠt̪ˠ oː ˈl̪ˠeːɾʲə]; 1746 – 4 May 1773), also anglicized as Art O'Leary, was a Roman Catholic member of the Gaelic nobility of Ireland, was a captain in the Hungarian Hussars Regiment of the army of Holy Roman Empress Maria Theresa of Austria.

== Life ==
He married Eibhlín Dubh Ní Chonaill (aunt of Daniel O'Connell) in 1767; she had been a widow from the age of 15 and was now 23. They had three children, Cornelius, Fiach and a third who apparently did not survive infancy.

Having returned home to Rathleigh House near Macroom, Cork, Ireland, the hot-tempered Art became involved in a feud with a Protestant landowner and magistrate, Abraham Morris of Hanover Hall, Macroom. When Morris was High Sheriff of County Cork in 1771, he laid charges against Art following Art's alleged attack on Morris and the wounding of his servant on 13 July 1771 at Hanover Hall. In that October, Art was indicted his absence, and Morris offered a 20 guinea reward for his capture.

The feud between the two men continued and in 1773, Morris demanded that Art sell him the fine horse that Ó Laoghaire had brought back from his service in the Austro-Hungarian army for £5. The Penal Laws stated that no Catholic might own a horse worth more than £5 and could be forced to sell a more valuable one on demand to any Protestant at this price. Art refused to sell and challenged Morris to a duel, which Morris declined. Morris used, or misused, his position as magistrate to persuade his fellow magistrates to proclaim Art an outlaw, who could then legally be shot on sight. Morris led a contingent of soldiers that tracked Ó Laoghaire down to Carrignanimma on 4 May 1773, and he gave the order to fire on Art. The first shot, which killed Art, was fired by a soldier called Green.

Morris and the soldiers were held to be guilty of Art's murder by a coroner's inquest on 17 May, but Morris was acquitted of the murder by Cork magistrates on 6 September 1773. (Under the Penal Laws, no Catholic could be a magistrate, or a lawyer.) Morris was shot in Cork on 7 July by Art's brother Cornelius, who saw Morris at a window of a house in Hammond's Lane where he was lodging and fired three shots, wounding Morris. The shots were not immediately fatal, but Morris died in September 1775: this was believed to have been as the result of the shooting. The soldier Green was decorated for his "gallantry".

His wife Eibhlín Dubh Ní Chonaill composed the long poem "Caoineadh Airt Uí Laoghaire" (Lament for Art O'Leary), mourning his death and calling for revenge.

Ó Laoghaire's tomb at Kilcrea Friary has the epitaph (probably composed by his widow): "Lo Arthur Leary, generous, handsome, brave, / Slain in his bloom lies in this humble grave."
