= Kilcrea Friary =

Ruined Franciscan friary in County Cork, Ireland

- Prióireacht Chill Chré
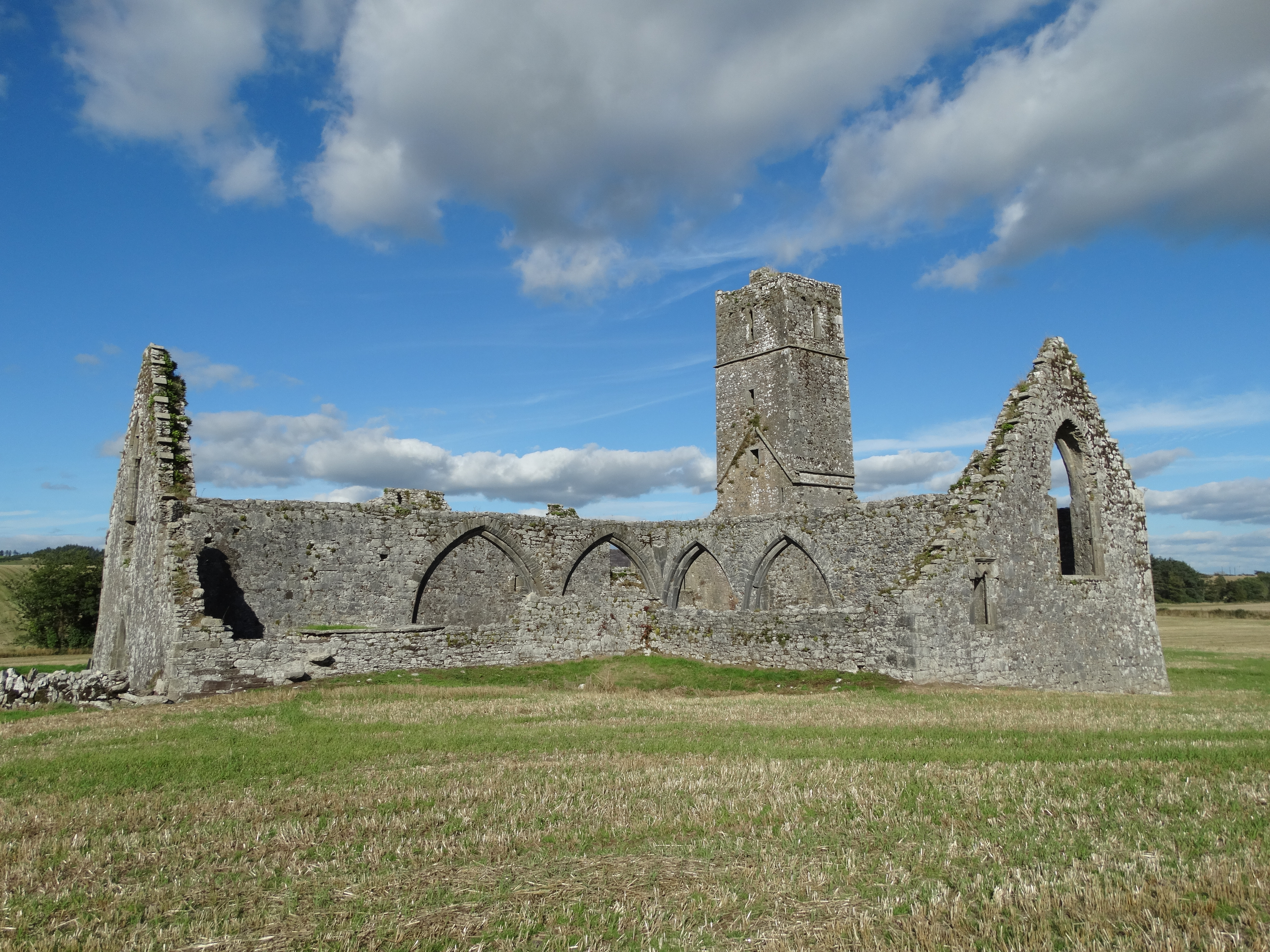
- Kilcrea Friary
- Interactive map of Kilcrea Friary

Monastery information
- Order: Franciscans
- Denomination: Catholic Church
- Established: 1463 or 1465

Architecture
- Status: Ruined

Site
- Location: Ovens, County Cork
- Country: Ireland
- Coordinates: 51°51′53″N 8°42′40″W
- Public access: Yes

Kilcrea Friary (Irish: Prióireacht Chill Chré) is a ruined medieval abbey located near Ovens, County Cork, Ireland. Both the friary and Kilcrea Castle, located in ruin to the west, were built by Observant Franciscans in the mid 15th century under the invitation of Cormac Láidir MacCarthy, Lord of Muskerry, as protection from English troops.

The friary was sacked by the English army a number of times in the late 1500s, during which it sustained considerable damage, but remained occupied by friars until the 1620s. MacCarthy was killed in battle in 1494 and is buried at the site. The site has remained in continuous use as a burial ground, and contains, among others, the remains of Art Ó Laoghaire, known for the lament composed for him by his widow Eibhlín Dubh Ní Chonaill.

The abbey's main features include an aisle, a transept on the south-side, and cloisters at the north end. The narrow tower is ascended via a series of steep and winding stairs. The areas around the tower were once dormitories, day rooms and kitchens.

The name Kilcrea is derived from the from Irish Cill Chré, meaning 'Cell of Cyra'. Cyra was an early medieval abbess who reputedly founded a nunnery to the east of the friary in the parish of St Owen's (Ovens).

== History ==
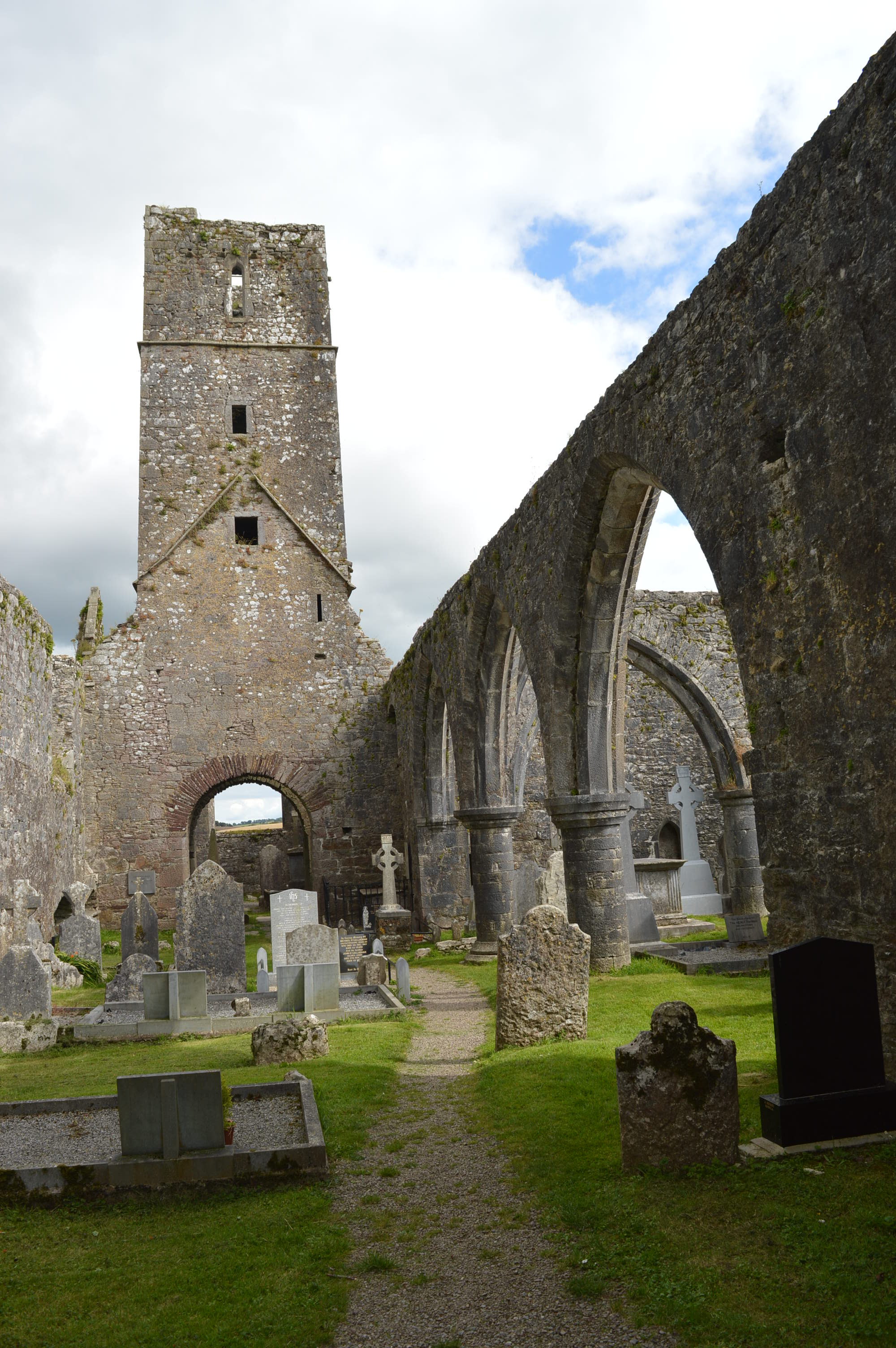
Tower and arches

The abbey was founded in 1465 for the Observant Franciscans by Cormac Láidir MacCarthy, Lord of Muskerry, on the grounds of on an earlier Christian site. Located in the valley of the Bride river, it is named after the sixth-century holy lady Saint Cyra (also known as St Créidh), said to have been the abbess of the original nunnery located on the site, and who by legend may be interred in the centre of the choir. Although both the abbey and nearby Kilcrea Castle are located in what is today open countryside, it is thought that originally the sites were positioned on an east–west axis of a now-abandoned early medieval settlement.

Kilcrea was first attacked by the English army in 1542 and sacked in 1584, but continued in use under MacCarthy's patronage. In 1597, it was granted to Cormac MacDermot MacCarthy. It was twice repaired, including in 1604, and remained active until the 1620s, with Fr. John Gould recorded as Superior in 1621.

Its grounds have been used for general burial since the early 17th century; mostly in the graveyard within the ruins of the abbey's chancel. It was the burial place of the McCarthy's of Muskerry from 1494 to 1616, commencing. with Cormac MacCarthy. However, there are no surviving traces of their tombs on the site. Cormac Láidir MacCarthy tomb bears the inscription: "Hit Jacet Cormac filius Derm-ittu Magni MlcCarthy, Domii nus de Illutsgraiyli IFlayn, at istius conventus prinius fun dator An. Dont. 1495". A head carved on the tower's upper floors is thought to represent him.

A 15th-century manuscript written at Kilcrea, known as the Rennes Manuscript, is preserved in Rennes, France. Consisting of 125 folios of poor-quality parchment, the book is an important example of Dinshenchas. A separate oval reliquary, measuring 2.5 inches long and 2.5 inches wide, dated from the late medieval period was found on the site. It is inscribed on two sides, with the words "IN HOC SIGNUM VINCE" on one and "EICCE BENEDICTUS AGNUS DEI" on the reverse. The object was seemingly intended to be carried, as indicted by the rope moldings which contain loops in which a chain could be attached.

The abbey is a National Monument of Ireland, #182, which entitles it to state protection. However, there have been some reported illegal excavations in the graveyard by detectorists.

== Architecture and layout ==
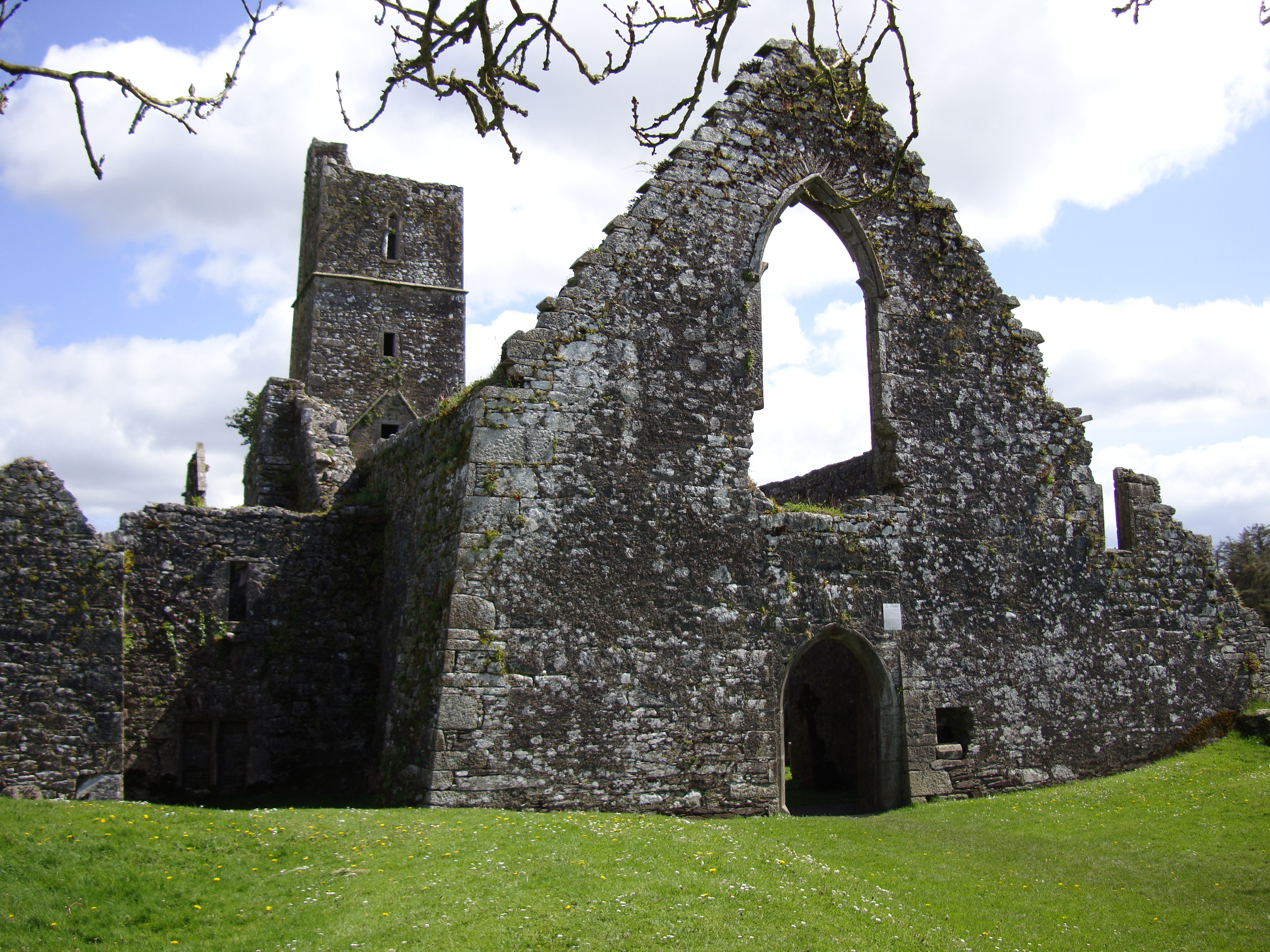
Kilcrea Friary, with tower in background

Kilcrea Friary consists of a series of buildings located around a main church or chapel. Although in ruins, the abbey is still relatively complete, including its tower, cloister and the surrounding east, west and north-facing buildings. The abbey's chapel contains a nave, chancel, transept and an L-shaped aisle. It is entered through a doorway in its west gable. An arcade separates the nave from the south aisle and transept. The chancel contains a large window on its east wall, which has lost its original intersecting tracery. The other four pointed windows are fixed on the south wall via segmental-headed embrasures, and contained either single or twined glass panes (lights). No trace survives of the high altar which was likely positioned under the east window, but an arched piscina is found nearby in the south wall. Adjoining the chancel is the sacristy which was added in the 16th century, above which is the scriptorium.

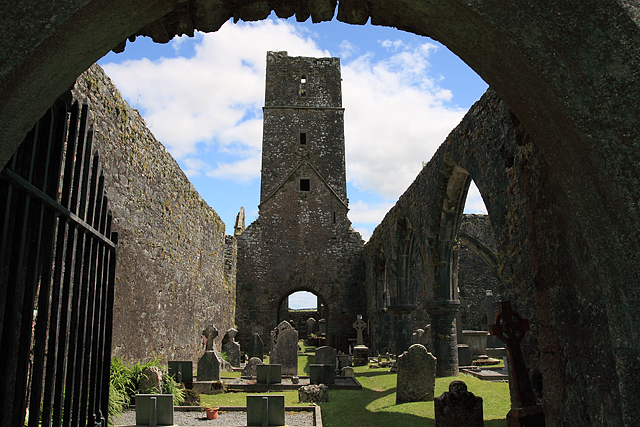
Nave and tower in ruins

The cloister area is located north of the church. The arcades are missing from the cloister, although the roofless two-story ranges are well preserved and mostly intact. The remains of the chapter room and refectory or possibly the kitchen (33 x 21 ft) are located on the east range, above which are the dormitories. There is evidence in some records that the friary once contained an infirmary, however, the precise room has not been identified.

The scriptorium measures 39 x 17 ft and probably also functioned as a study room. As with all such rooms in medieval Irish friaries, it was the most well-lit room on the site; the room in Kilcrea contains 11 tall two-light windows. A recess for a holy water stoup is located outside the doorway, and in the gable over the doorway are the remains of a large, three-light window. The tower contained four storeys with timber floors supported on stone corbels. Each storey was lit by plain, narrow, flat-headed windows. Except for the top storey where there is a single ogee-headed light in each wall. It is broader at its base in order to accommodate the stairways and passage to the tower.

== Notable burials ==
- Cormac Laidir MacCarthy (1411–1494), 6th Lord of Muskerry
- Thomas O'Herlahy, Catholic Bishop of Ross (1561–1579)
- Charles MacCarthy (died 1704), Jacobite politician.
- Art Ó Laoghaire (1746–1773), subject of the poem "Caoineadh Airt Uí Laoghaire"
