= MacCarthy of Muskerry =

Gaelic Irish noble family from Munster

MacCarthy Mac Cárthaigh
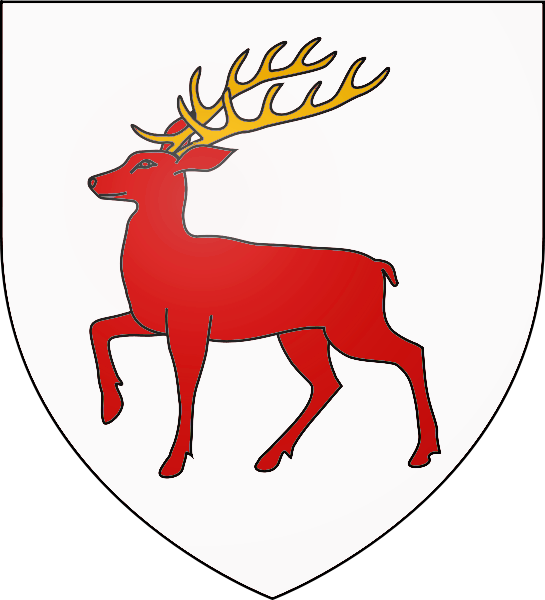
- Parent family: MacCarthy Mor
- Founded: 1353
- Founder: Dermot, 1st Lord of Muskerry
- Final ruler: Donogh, 4th Earl of Clancarty
- Titles: Lord of Muskerry, Viscount Muskerry, and Earl of Clancarty
- Estate: Muskerry

The MacCarthy dynasty of Muskerry is a tacksman branch of the MacCarthy Mor dynasty, the Kings of Desmond.

== Origins and advancement ==
Family tree

The main line of the MacCarthys of Muskerry. (Note: This family tree is based on a tree of the Lords of Muskerry, a tree showing Donough and near family around him, and on genealogies of the Earls of Clancarty, the MacCarthy of Muskerry family, the Earls of Thomond, and the Earls of Ormond.)

Dermot; 1st Lord; 1310–1367
Cormac; 2nd Lord d. 1374
Teige; 6th Lord; 1380–1448	Owen; 7th Lord	Cormac; 8th Lord
Cormac; Laidir; 9th Lord; 1411–1494	Mary; Fitzmaurice	Owen; MacCarthy d. 1498
Cormac; Oge Laidir; 10th Lord; 1447–1536	Catherine; Barry
Teige; 11th Lord; 1472–1565	Callaghan; 12th Lord
Dermot; 13th Lord; 1501–1570	Ellen; FitzGerald	Cormac; 14th Lord d. 1583 tanist	Callaghan; 15th Lord tanist resigned 1584
Donogh; O'Brien; 4th Earl; Thomond d. 1624	Cormac; MacDermot; 16th Lord; 1552–1616	Mary; Butler
Margaret; O'Brien d. c. 1599	Charles; 1st Viscount; Muskerry d. 1641	Ellen; Roche
Donough; 1st Earl; 1594–1665	Eleanor; Butler; 1612–1682
Charles; Viscount; Muskerry** c. 1633 – 1665 d.v.p.*	Margaret; Bourke d. 1698	Callaghan; 3rd Earl d. 1676	Elizabeth; FitzGerald d. 1698	Justin; Viscount; Mountcashel c. 1643 – 1694
Charles James; 2nd Earl; 1663–1666 infant	Donough; 4th Earl; 1668–1734	Elizabeth; Spencer; 1671–1704
Robert; MacCarty; 1698–1769	Elizabeth; Farnelly

Legend

XXX	Lords & Viscounts Muskerry, as well as Earls of Clancarty	XXX	Viscount; Mountcashel

*d.v.p. = predeceased his father (decessit vita patris)
**courtesy title

The MacCarthy of Muskerry are a cadet branch of the MacCarthy Mor, Kings of Desmond. This cadet branch was founded by Dermot MacCarthy, 1st Lord of Muskerry, second son of Cormac MacCarthy Mor, King of Desmond, who was in 1353 created Lord of Muskerry by the English. This title's position is unclear. Cormac Laidir MacCarthy, 9th Lord of Muskerry was called Dominus and F. Dermot's descendant Cormac Oge MacCarthy, 17th Lord of Muskerry, was in 1628 created Charles MacCarthy, 1st Viscount Muskerry, and his son, the 2nd Viscount Muskerry, was in 1658 created Donough MacCarty, 1st Earl of Clancarty.

== Lands ==
The family's ancestral lands of were situated along the River Lee in the baronies of Muskerry West and Muskerry East, in central County Cork west of the City of Cork.

== Castles ==
- Blarney Castle, enlarged by Cormac Laidir MacCarthy, 9th Lord of Muskerry
- Carrigaphooca Castle, built by Dermot McCarthy of Drishane Castle.
- Castle Salem, Cork
- Kilcrea Castle, built by Cormac Laidir MacCarthy, 9th Lord of Muskerry
- Macroom Castle
- Carrigadrohid castle.
- Carrignamuck Tower House

== Monasteries ==
Kilcrea Friary, built by Cormac Laidir MacCarthy, 9th Lord of Muskerry

== Blarney Stone ==
The Blarney Stone passed from MacCarthy hands during the Williamite wars. Following the forfeiture by Donogh McCarthy, 4th Earl of Clancarthy, the castle property passed to the Hollow Sword Blade Company who subsequently sold it to Sir James St. John Jefferyes, Governor of Cork in 1688.

== Downfall ==
Donough MacCarthy, 4th Earl of Clancarty fought in the Williamite War in Ireland for James II of England against William III of England. He was attainted at the defeat in 1691 and the MacCarthys of Muskerry lost the noble titles of Earl of Clancarty, Viscount Muskerry, and Baron Blarney.

The titles of Mountcashel and Baron Castleinch, of the (1689 creation, went extinct with the death of Justin MacCarthy in 1694. At that date the MacCarthys of Muskerry had therefore lost all their noble titles in the peerage of Ireland.

== Notes and references ==
=== Sources ===
- Burke, Bernard (1866). A Genealogical History of the Dormant, Abeyant, Forfeited and Extinct Peerages of the British Empire (New ed.). London: Harrison. OCLC 11501348.
- Burke, Bernard; Burke, Ashworth Peter (1915). A Genealogical and Heraldic History of the Peerage and Baronetage, the Privy Council, Knightage and Companionage (77th ed.). London: Harrison. OCLC 1155471554.
- Butler, William F. T. (1925). Gleanings from Irish History. London: Longmans, Green and Co. OCLC 557681240.
- Cokayne, George Edward (1896). Complete Peerage of England, Scotland, Ireland, Great Britain and the United Kingdom, Extant, Extinct, or Dormant. Vol. VII (1st ed.). London: George Bell and Sons. OCLC 1180891114. – S to T
- Cokayne, George Edward (1913). Gibbs, Vicary (ed.). The complete peerage of England, Scotland, Ireland, Great Britain and the United Kingdom, extant, extinct, or dormant. Vol. III (2nd ed.). London: St Catherine Press. OCLC 228661424. – Canonteign to Cutts
- Gillman, Herbert Webb (1892). "Historical Pedigree 1380 to 1641 A.D., of MacCarthys, Lord of Muskerry, Co. Cork" (PDF). Journal of the Cork Historical and Archaeological Society. 1 (10). fold-out.
- Keating, Geoffrey (1723). The General History of Ireland. Translated by O'Çonnor, Dermot. London: J. Bettenham. OCLC 1264766847.
- Lainé, P. Louis (1836). "Mac-Carthy". Archives généalogiques et historiques de la noblesse de France [Genealogical and Historical Archives of the Nobility of France] (in French). Vol. Tome cinquième. Paris: Imprimerie de Bethune et Plon. pp. 1–102. OCLC 865941166.
- McCarthy, Samuel Trant (1922). The MacCarthys of Munster. Dundalk: The Dundalgan Press. OCLC 1157128759.
- O'Hart, John (1892). Irish Pedigrees: Or, the Origin and Stem of the Irish Nation. Vol. I (5th ed.). Dublin: James Duffy & Co. OCLC 7239210. – Irish stem
