= Hollow Sword Blade Company =

Joint-stock company that manufactures hollow-ground rapiers

The Hollow Sword Blades Company was a British joint-stock company founded in 1691 by a goldsmith, Sir Stephen Evance, for the manufacture of hollow-ground rapiers.

In 1700 the company was purchased by a syndicate of businessmen who used the corporate identity of the company to operate as a bank. At this time the Bank of England held a monopoly by act of parliament as the only organisation permitted to operate as a bank in England, so anyone wishing to carry out banking operations had to do so by devious means. The company was used as a stepping stone to the foundation of the South Sea Company which set out to supplant the Bank of England as banker to the government.

== Founder ==
Sir Stephen Evance was a goldsmith whose father had been born in New England, but who had set up a business in Lombard Street in London. Evance did not confine his interests simply to metalwork, but had attempted salvage work with a diving machine, lead mining, mineral prospecting in Canada, a fishing enterprise off the coast of Ireland in partnership with Sir James Houblon (one of the founders of the Bank of England) and a draper named Samuel Ongley.

Sir Stephen Evance was Governor of the Hudson's Bay Company during 1692–1696 and 1700–1712. He first acquired stock in the Hudson's Bay Company in February 1684, and he was a good friend of the company who would arrange money and other favours for the company. For this, Evance received a gratuity from the Deputy Governor of 50 "Gunneys" (sic) to buy a couple of horses to pull his coach.

Sir Stephen committed suicide in 1712. He had accumulated significant debts and reputedly believed that his situation indicated a terminal failure in life. Sir Stephen never married or had any children of his own, but he did have a niece named Hester Child who inherited his estate, which was significant, even after the debts were paid.

== Company origins ==
In 1691, war between France and England interrupted the importation of hollow ground swords from France which had become popular weapons in England and a business opportunity presented to manufacture the swords in England. Evance arranged for Huguenot metalworkers to move to Britain to manufacture the swords and obtained a charter of corporation as the 'Governor and Company for Making Hollow Sword Blades in England', granted 13 October 1691. The company obtained premises at Shotley Bridge in Durham. Granting of the charter plus two patents was on condition the applicants loaned the government £50,000, which sum was provided by Evance and Sir Francis Child in August 1692. Evance was appointed the first governor of the company, Peter Reneu the deputy governor, assistants Francis Tissen, Matthew Evans, John Carter, John Holland, Abraham Dashwood, John Samford, Robert Peter, Thomas Evans, Peter Justice, John Reneu, William Reneu, John Baker. The corporation had power to purchase land and issue stock to unlimited value.

The company manufactured swords and by virtue of the charter had power to seize imported foreign hollow swords. Evance became an excise commissioner and succeeded Childs as jeweller to King William III. However, after the king's death in 1702 Evance's involvement in the Hollow Sword Blade Company was minimal. One of the swordsmiths employed by the company, Herman Mohll continued to manufacture swords at Shotley in his own right under the name Herman Mohll and son, founding a company which continued with a change of name to Mole in 1832. The company was purchased by Wilkinson Sword in 1922.

== Banking operations ==
The Hollow Sword Blade Company was sold and moved to Birchin Lane in London, to the premises of its new company secretary, John Blunt, a scrivener (lawyer specialising in business and financial contracts). The sale was probably arranged by Francis Child, whose son was a banker and business associate of Blunt. The new Governor was Elias Turner, a goldsmith with a shop in Lombard street under the sign of the Fleece, who provided both finance and experience. The deputy Governor was Jacob Sawbridge, who came from a business family and who had a small estate in Canterbury. The fourth partner, George Caswall, came from Leominster which his family had represented as MP for generations. His father had been Mayor, and Receiver of the land tax for Monmouthshire. Caswall was a partner with another goldsmith, Brassey, specialising in finance and trading securities. Daniel Defoe described them: "Sawbridge is as cunning as Caswall is bold, and the reserve of the one with the openness of the other makes a complete Exchange Alley man. Turner ... acts in concert ... and makes together a complete triumvirate of thieving". (Exchange Alley was the place where stock trading and other financial transactions took place in London.) The objective of the partnership was to break into the business monopolised by the Bank of England, which was handling and providing loans for the government.

In 1703 the company purchased some of the Irish estates forfeited under the Williamite settlement in counties Mayo, Sligo, Galway, and Roscommon. They also bought the forfeited estates of the Earl of Clancarty (McCarthy) in counties Cork and Kerry and of Sir Patrick Trant in counties Kerry, Limerick, Kildare, Dublin, King and Queen's counties (Offaly and Laois). Further lands in counties Limerick, Tipperary, Cork and other counties, formerly the estate of James II were also purchased, also part of the estate of Lord Cahir in county Tipperary. In June 1703 the company bought a large estate in county Cork, confiscated from a number of attainted persons and other lands in counties Waterford and Clare. However within about 10 years the company had sold most of its Irish estates. Francis Edwards, a London merchant, was one of the main purchasers.

Estate in Ireland of the Company for making Hollow Sword Blades in England Act 1703
- Act of Parliament
- Parliament of England
- Long title: An Act to discharge the Governor and Company for making hollow Sword Blades in England, of the Sum of Eighteen Thousand Eight Hundred Sixty-four Pounds, Seven Shillings, One Penny Half-penny, by Mistake overcharged in the Purchase-money for several forfeited and other Estates and Interests in Ireland, purchased by them.
- Citation: 2 & 3 Ann. c. 21 (Note: This is the citation in The Statutes of the Realm); 6 Ann. c. 12 (Note: This is the citation in The Statutes at Large)
- Territorial extent: England and Wales

Dates
- Royal assent: 24 February 1704
- Commencement: 9 November 1703 (Note: Start of session.)
- Repealed: 15 July 1867
Other legislation
Repealed by	Statute Law Revision Act 1867
Relates to	Forfeited Estates Act 1707

Status: Repealed

Text of statute as originally enacted

The recent reconquest of Ireland by forces loyal to William III had resulted in the confiscation of land from Jacobites which had been given to members of the Williamite army. Blunt was amongst others who campaigned that the property should instead have been sold to defer government expenses, and an act of parliament, the Estate in Ireland of the Company for making Hollow Sword Blades in England Act 1703 (2 & 3 Ann. c. 21), was passed cancelling the grants of land which instead were to be sold. The Sword Blade company now used its charter powers to own property to purchase land to the value of £200,000 with anticipated revenues of £20,000 per year, or 10%. To pay for this, the company used a trick which the Bank of England had employed in its own creation. The Hollow Sword Blades Company issued shares, which it was also entitled to do under its charter. It offered to exchange its own shares at a nominal value of £100 for £100 of government debt issued by the army paymaster. The government was willing to accept its own debt as payment for the land, so no cash money was required for the transactions. The army debt could at that time only be sold on the open market at a rate of £85 per £100 of face value, so this offered a way for holders to realise a better price. The land remained the property of the company, and the company would pay dividends on the shares from its rental income.

The deal was negotiated with the treasury by Blunt and their legal advisor, Lake and agreed on 1 June 1704. Once the debt was cancelled, the government no longer had to pay interest upon it, which it had been doing at 7.5%. However, it also required a 'sweetener' in the form of receiving a new loan of £20,000 at 5% as part of the deal, secured against Royal shares in Cornish tin.

Before announcing the offer, the Sword Blade Syndicate made full advantage of the anticipated rise in value of army debt, by buying as much as it could privately beforehand. This was then sold as the price rose once the general market realised there was an offer available to trade in the debt at its full value.

The Sword Blade company also branched out into providing mortgages for other would be purchasers of Irish land, accepting cash deposits and issuing its own notes. This came to the attention of the Bank of England, who advised the treasury that their own monopoly to act as a bank was being infringed. The treasury took no action. In part, the government recognised that it had a good deal it did not wish to spoil. There was also a legal complication, that the Bank act protected it against any other company being set up by act of parliament to operate as a bank. In the case of the sword company charter, although the steps to enact its charter had been commenced, they had never actually been completed in Parliament.

The Bank of England charter was due to expire in 1710, and they were concerned to arrange its renewal. Others, however, continued to lobby Parliament not to do so, and a new syndicate had formed, offering to take on funding of the latest loan required by government. The Bank responded by dropping its interest rate to underbid the competition, and succeeded in renewing its charter until 1732, with more strictly drawn terms to prevent others operating as banks.

Forfeited Estates Act 1707
- Act of Parliament
- Parliament of Great Britain
- Long title: An Act for limiting a Time to Persons to come in, and make their Claims to any of the forfeited Estates, and other Interests in Ireland, sold by the Trustees for Sale of those Estates to the Governor and Company for Making Hollow Sword-Blades in England, and divers other Purchasers.
- Citation: 6 Ann. c. 61; 6 Ann. c. 34
- Territorial extent: Great Britain

Dates
- Royal assent: 1 April 1708
- Commencement: 23 October 1707
- Repealed: 15 July 1867
Other legislation
Repealed by	Statute Law Revision Act 1867
Relates to	Estate in Ireland of the Company for making Hollow Sword Blades in England Act 1703

Status: Repealed

Text of statute as originally enacted

Further complications faced the Sword Blade company, as title to land in Ireland began to be disputed by relatives of dispossessed Jacobites and others claiming to have bought from the initial beneficiaries of the first cancelled land distribution. The matter was settled by an act of parliament in 1708, the Forfeited Estates Act 1707 (6 Ann. c. 61), setting a time limit on further claims, but by then the company stock had fallen to £55 per nominal £100 issued. As some consolation, pressure was also mounting on the Bank of England from an increasingly distressed government seeking new ways to raise money.

== Sources ==
- Carswell, John (1960), The South Sea Bubble, London: Cresset Press
- Cowles, Virginia (1960), The Great Swindle: The Story of the South Sea Bubble, New York: Harper
- Dale, Richard S.; et al. (2005), "Financial markets can go mad: evidence of irrational behaviour during the South Sea Bubble", Economic History Review, 58 (2): 233–271, doi:10.1111/j.1468-0289.2005.00304.x, S2CID 154836178
- Hoppit, Julian. (2002) "The Myths of the South Sea Bubble," Transactions of the Royal Historical Society, (2002) Vol. 12 Issue 1, pp 141–165 in JSTOR
- Paul, Helen Julia (2010) The South Sea Bubble: an economic history of its origins and consequences, Routledge Explorations in Economic History, Routledge, London.
- Shea, Gary S. (2007), "Understanding financial derivatives during the South Sea Bubble: The case of the South Sea subscription shares" (PDF), Oxford Economic Papers, 59 (Supplement 1): i73–i104, doi:10.1093/oep/gpm031
- Temin, Peter; Voth, Hans-Joachim (2004), "Riding the South Sea Bubble", American Economic Review, 94 (5): 1654–1668, doi:10.1257/0002828043052268, hdl:10230/508
