= John Windele =

Irish antiquarian (1801–1865)

John Windele (1801 – 28 August 1865) was an Irish antiquarian, particularly interested in early Irish literature and Ogham inscriptions.

== Life ==
Windele was born in Cork in 1801. From early in life he was interested in antiquities, and in particular he studied Irish antiquities. He became a contributor to Bolster's Quarterly Magazine, an antiquarian journal published in Cork, and so became acquainted with a number of Irish archaeologists and literary men, including Abraham Abell, William Willes, Matthew Horgan and Francis Sylvester Mahony. With these colleagues Windele made many excursions, examining and sketching ruins and natural curiosities.

He was particularly interested in searching for the early records engraved on stone known as Ogham inscriptions, and he saved many of them from destruction by removing them to his own home, where they formed what he termed his megalithic library. One of these engravings was later sent to University College Cork, and the others to the Royal Irish Academy. Windele also devoted much time to the study of early Irish literature, and he made a large collection of manuscripts.

He is credited with the design of the Waterloo Round Tower, an architectural folly built in the 1840s to resemble a mediaeval round tower.

Windele died at his home, Blair's Hill, Cork, on 28 August 1865.

He left a collection of manuscripts extending to 130 volumes, which were purchased by the Royal Irish Academy in 1865. They included copies of many early Irish manuscripts. Selections from a manuscript journal of his archaeological expeditions which was found among them were published in the Journal of the Cork Historical and Archæological Society between May 1897 and March 1898.

== Publications ==
In 1839 Windele published Historical and Descriptive Notices of the City of Cork and its Vicinity; in 1849 this was abridged and published as A Guide to Cork. He also wrote A Guide to Killarney, and frequently contributed to the Dublin Penny Journal and to the Proceedings of the Kilkenny Archaeological Society, of which he was a member from its foundation in 1849. In 1860 he edited Matthew Horgan's Cahir Conri, an Irish metrical legend, with a translation into English verse by Edward Kenealy.
