= Muskerry =

Region of County Cork in Ireland

Muskerry (Irish: Múscraí) is a central region of County Cork, Ireland which incorporates the baronies of Muskerry West and Muskerry East. It is located along the valley of the River Lee and is bounded by the Boggeragh Mountains to the north and the Shehy Mountains to the south. The region is named after the Múscraige, who were an important Érainn people of Munster. It is also the name of an official Gaeltacht region in which Munster Irish is spoken. Gaeltacht villages include Baile Bhuirne, Béal Átha an Ghaorthaidh, Cill na Martra, and Cúil Aodha. Towns include Ballincollig, Blarney, and Macroom.

== See also ==
- Múscraige, the ancient name for the area and people
- MacCarthy of Muskerry, the great dynasty
- Viscount Muskerry and Earl of Clancarty
- Baron Muskerry
- Cork and Muskerry Light Railway
- Saint Gobnait
- Saint Cyra
- Donegan (disambiguation)
