= Kilcrea Castle =

15th-century ruined tower house and bawn

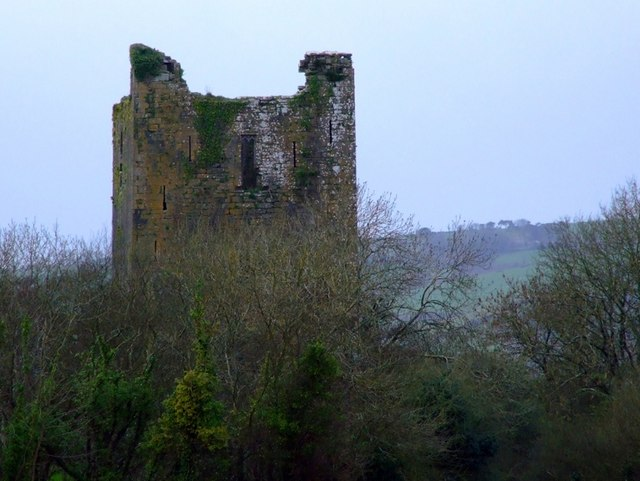

- Kilcrea Castle in Ireland
- 51.865°N 8.718°W

History
- Built: Mid-15th century
- Built for: MacCarthys of Muskerry

Site notes
- Area: County Cork, Ireland
- Architectural styles: tower house and bawn
- Governing body: On private land

Kilcrea Castle is a ruined 15th-century towerhouse and bawn located near the Kilcrea Friary, west of Cork City, Ireland. The tower house and friary were both built by Cormac Laidir MacCarthy, 9th Lord of Muskerry.

== Location ==
Kilcrea Castle stands in a copse, which almost hides it, in the valley of the River Bride on its right (southern) bank. This River Bride is a right-hand tributary of the River Lee (not the River Bride that flows into the Munster Blackwater).

Kilcrea Friary is nearby to the east, on the same side of the river. Ovens is the nearest village. It is between Cork City and Macroom.

== History and construction ==
The castle was completed by 1465 by Cormac Laidir MacCarthy, 9th Lord of Muskerry and founder of Kilcrea Friary, in a marshy area over an old fort possibly dating to the Bronze Age.

The overall structure was built facing north (towards the River Bride), with the main five-story tower house on the western side and the bawn on the eastern side towards the friary. The remains of a three-story tower anchor the southeast corner of the bawn. Text from the 1840s state that the bawn was enclosed with two square towers, however any physical evidence of a second tower on the bawn is lost to the undergrowth.

In the mid-19th century a cutting of the now disused Cork and Macroom Railway line was built through the moat of the castle on the northern side.

== Ownership ==
Unlike the friary, which is in state ownership and is maintained by the National Monuments Service of Ireland, the ruins are on privately owned lands, the land immediate to, and including the ruins themselves, currently serving as a cattle farm. The castle is listed as a protected structure by Cork County Council.

== Gallery ==
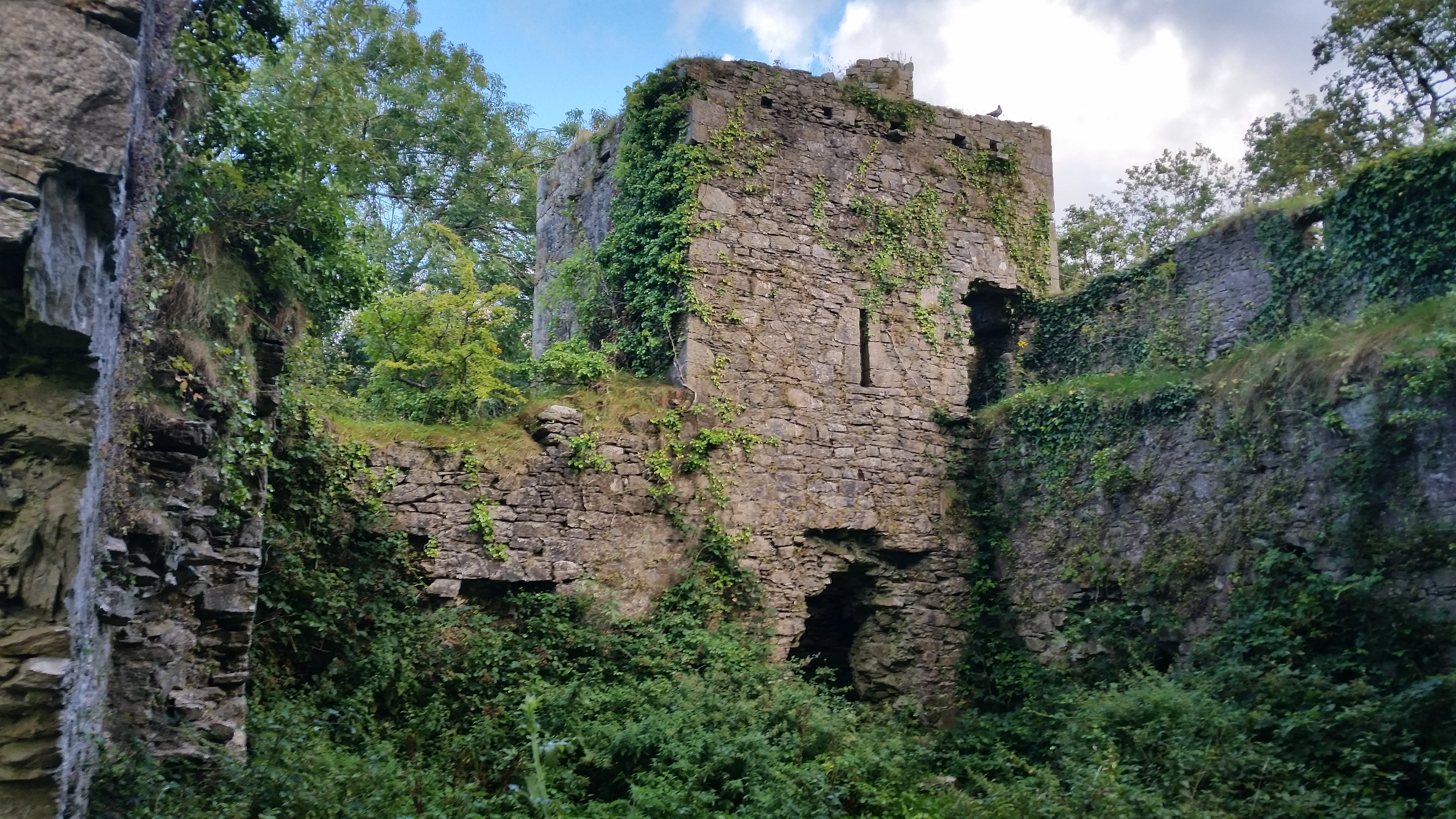
Inner castle courtyard

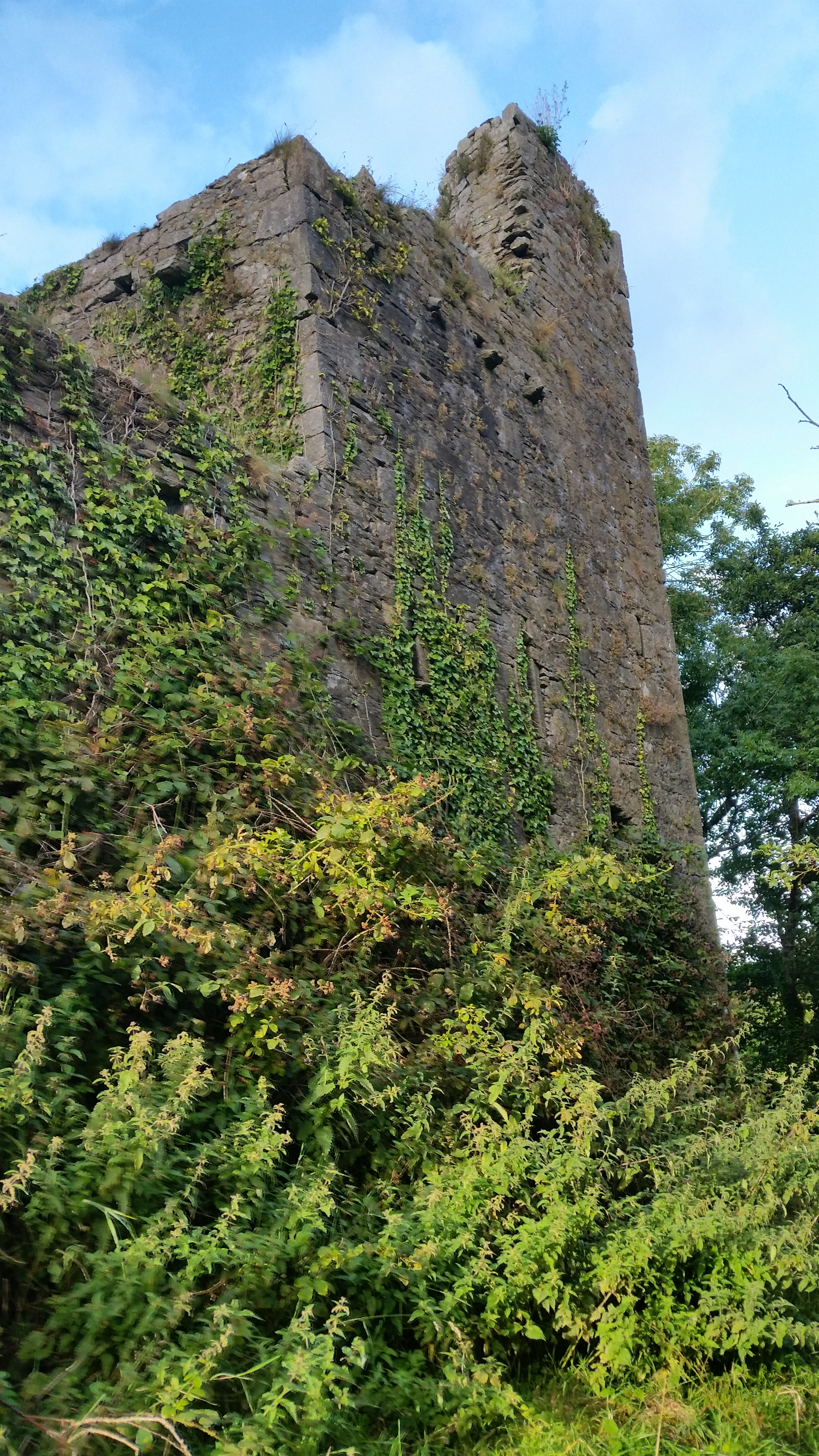
Southeast tower

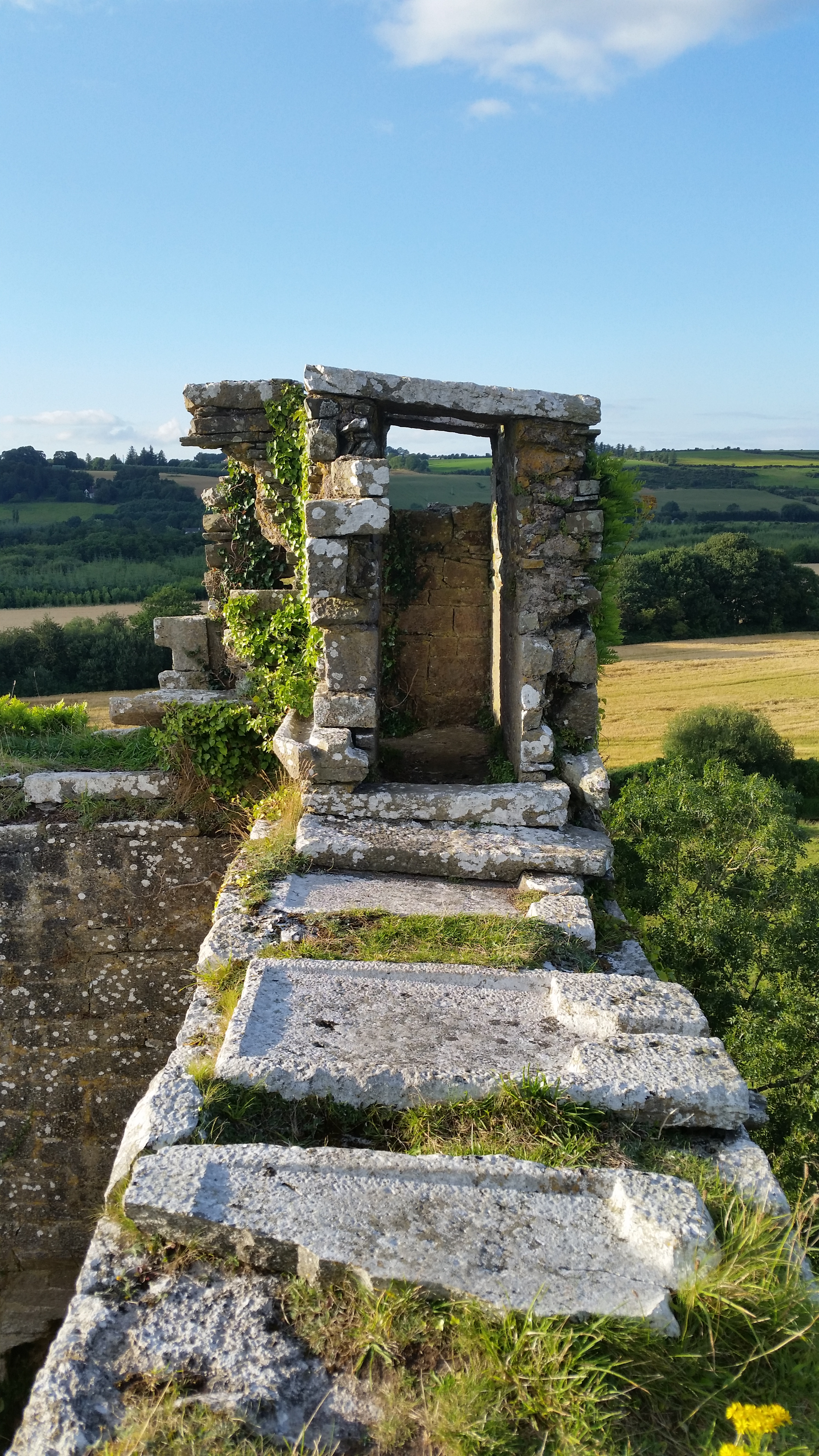
Castle battlements
