= Muskerry West =

Barony in County Cork, Ireland

Muskerry West (Irish: Múscraí Thiar (Note: Muskerry West)) is one of the baronies of Ireland, a historical geographical unit of land. Its chief town is Macroom. It is one of 24 baronies in County Cork. It may also be viewed as a half barony because sometime before the 1821 census, it was divided from its other half – Muskerry East. Neighbouring baronies include Duhallow to the north (whose chief town is Newmarket) and the Barony of Carbery East (West Division) to the south (whose chief town is Dunmanway).

== Legal context ==
Baronies were created after the Norman invasion of Ireland as divisions of counties and were used the administration of justice and the raising of revenue. While baronies continue to be officially defined units, they have been administratively obsolete since 1898. However, they continue to be used in land registration and in specification, such as in planning permissions. In many cases, a barony corresponds to an earlier Gaelic túath which had submitted to the Crown.

== History ==
The Múscraige and Corcu Duibne descend form Corc, a son of Cairbre Musc. While the Múscraige petty kingdoms were scattered throughout the province of Munster, the largest were centred on the present baronies of Muskerry (West and East). The tribes or septs were pre-Eóganachta, that is before the 6th century. At this time, the territory did not extend south of the River Lee (although the river bisects the current barony). A pedigree of the chieftains of the tribe may be found in the Book of Leinster. The main septs were:

Irish name of the túath	Equivalent barony	County
Múscraige Tíre	Ormond Lower and Owney and Arra	County Tipperary
Múscraige Breógain	Clanwilliam	County Tipperary
Múscraige Tri Maighe	Orrery and Kilmore and part of the barony of Duhallow	County Cork
Múscraige Mittaine	Muskerry East, Muskerry West and Barretts	County Cork
Múscraige Aodha (alias Múscraige Luachra)	Various baronies	Counties Cork, Tipperary and Limerick

Rivalry between the princely houses of the outer circle of the Eóganacht would eventually undo the kingdom of Múscraige Mittaine. The O'Donoghues, originally from Eóganacht Raithlind, moved in to become the new princes of Eóganacht Locha Léin. This forced the erstwhile rulers of Locha Léin - the O'Flynns - to migrate eastwards. Sometime after 1096, Múscraighe Mittaine fell to the O'Flynns. The local Ó Donnagáin dynasty persisted in their opposition to the usurpers, at least until 1115 when they killed the reigning O'Flynn king of Muskerry. Thereafter, both dynasties were united in obscurity. From 1118 onwards, the kings of Desmond came from the leading family of Eóganacht Chaisil - the MacCarthy dynasty. The reigning king at the time of the Norman invasion of Ireland was Dermod Mór na Cill Baghain MacCarthy, who, in 1171 submitted to King Henry II of England. In so doing, he hoped to secure the king's protection for his lands, particularly from Henry's own barons, as was the Gaelic way. Instead, Henry granted of Dermod's entire kingdom to two of his leading adventurer knights, Robert Fitz-Stephen and Milo de Cogan in 1177. According to Giraldus, the grantees took possession of seven cantrefs only; three to the east of Cork city were allocated to Fitz-Stephen and four to the west to de Cogan. The remaining twenty four cantrefs they allowed to MacCarthy at rent.

An invasion into Múscraige Mittaine in 1201 in reported in the Annals of Inisfallen as follows:

AI1201.12: A mighty hosting this year in Desmumu by William and other foreigners, together with the royalty of all Mumu, i.e. including Muirchertach Ua Briain, Conchobar Ruad, and Donnchad Cairprech, and many others, and their plundering parties were sent against Múscraige Mittaine, and they committed great depredations. They proceeded thence to Cenn Eich, spent a week there, and made great raids and burned corn crops in every place they came to.

As neither Fitz-Stephen nor de Cogan left male heirs, the inheritance was confused. This suited the purposes of King John of England who, when he came to the throne, was determined to weaken the power of the Irish barons. He sequestered the kingdom of Desmond to the English crown and from 1200 to 1207 he proceeded to parcel out the land among his loyal subjects. Richard de Cogan (son of Milo's brother, Richard) got Múscraige Mittaine which he was expected to win by the sword. The de Cogans conquered most of this area, building castles at Mourne Abbey, Maglin (near Ballincollig), Dundrinan, (Castlemore near Cookstown), Dooniskey, Mahallagh, and Macroom. About 1242, John de Cogan (Richard's son) had the patronage of the churches of Clondrohid, Matehy, and Kilshannig. In 1254–1255, "Muscryemychene" was one of the cantrefs to pay a compotum of 40/- so that the county sessions might be held there.

The O'Learys (Irish: Ó Laoghaire) were originally chiefs of the territory lying around Rosscarbery, but removed from there about the time of the Anglo-Norman invasion. They became lords, under the MacCarthy dynasty, of the country between Macroom and Inchigeelagh. In 1642, sixteen leading men of the name were attainted (legally deprived of civil rights), including Connor O’Leary of Carrignacurra and Auliff O’Leary of Cunnowley.

Following the Battle of Callann, the MacCarthies successfully repulsed the Cambo-Normans although their leader Fínghin Mac Carthaigh was slain. In 1280 the MacCarthy Reagh sept of Carbery made peace with the main branch of the family, whose king was Domhnall Ruadh MacCarthy, the nephew of Fínghin Mac Carthaigh. They apportioned Desmond amongst themselves. The Cogans gradually lost their power and lands in Muskerry. Efforts by the viceroys Lionel and Rokeby to recover Cogan lands from the MacCarthys in east Muskerry failed. In 1398 the Mac Carthys were not alone free to plunder from Dingle to the territory of the Barretts, but could carry on their ancient feud against the Carbery MacCarthys at Carrigrohane.

The barony was recorded in the 1871 census as having the second highest proportion of Irish speakers - 55% - of all the baronies of County Cork. Only Ibane and Barryroe had a higher proportion (59%).

== Civil parishes ==
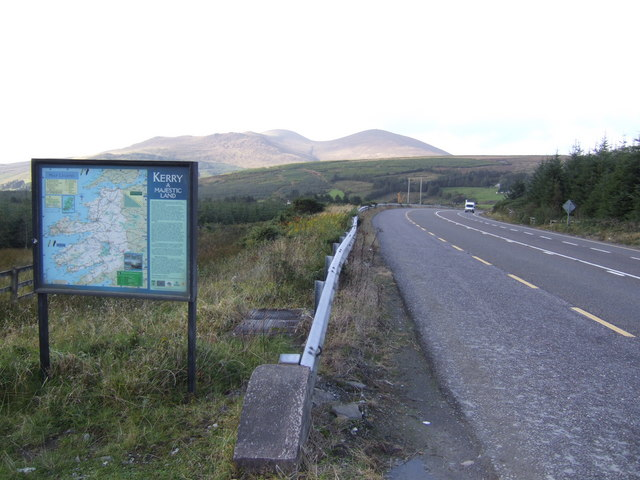
The most western part of the barony at the Kerry county bounds.

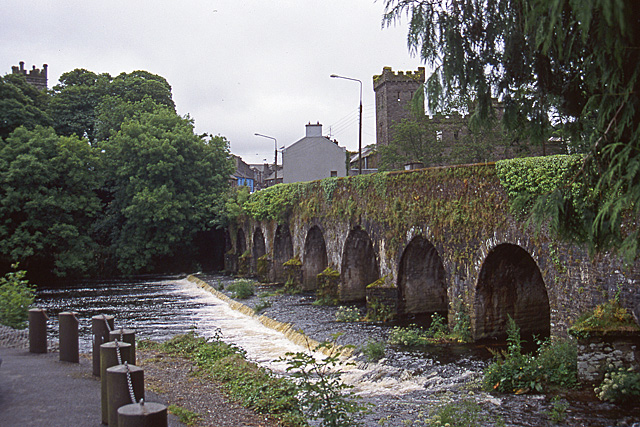
The most eastern part of the barony. A bridge over the River Sullane at Macroom.

There are 12 civil parishes in the barony.

Civil parish Irish name	Civil parish English name
Baile Bhuirne	Ballyvourney
Baile na Daibhche	Ballinadee
Cill Coirne	Kilcorney
Cill Mhichíl	Kilmichael
Cill Muire	Kilmurry
Cill na Martra	Kilnamartery
Cluain Droichead	Clondrohid
An Driseán	Drishane
Dún Uisce	Dunisky
Inse Geimhleach	Inchigeelagh
Maigh Chromtha	Macroom
Maigh Cluana Aichidh	Macloneigh

Note 1: The parish of Macroom consists of the core around the town as well as two exclaves mainly enclosed by the parish of Clondrohid as well as a third exclave between Clondrohid and the parish of Aghabulloge in the neighbouring barony of Muskerry East.
Note 2: Parishes shared with the neighbouring barony of Muskerry East to the east.

- Twenty four out of twenty six townlands of the parish of Kilmurry lie in the barony with the remaining two contiguous townlands lying in the barony of Muskerry East.

Note 3: Parishes shared with the neighbouring barony of Duhallow to the north.

- Forty-six out of fifty-two townlands of the parish of Drishane lie in the barony with the remaining six contiguous townlands lying in a salient of the barony of Duhallow.

Note 4: Parishes shared with the neighbouring barony of Carbery East to the south.

- 107 out of 118 townlands of the parish of Inchigeelagh lie in the barony with the remaining eleven contiguous townlands lying in the barony of Carbery East.
- Two thirds of the parish of Kilmichael lie in the barony with the remaining third lying in the barony of Carbery East.

== Attractions ==
- Carrigagulla, is a megalithic complex close to Ballinagree
- Knocknakilla, is megalithic complex that lies between Millstreet and Clondrohid

== See also ==
- List of civil parishes of County Cork
- List of townlands of the barony of West Muskerry
- MacCarthy of Muskerry
- Muskerry GAA, a club in Cork GAA
