= Carrigaphooca Castle =

14th century ruined tower house in County Cork, Ireland

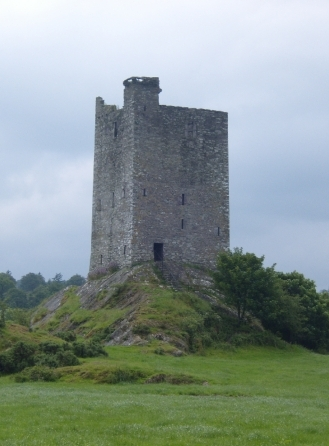
- Carrigaphooca Castle photographed from the north east

- Location within the Republic of Ireland
- 51.9086°N 9.0284°W
- Location: County Cork, Ireland

History
- Built: Early 15th century

National monument of Ireland
- Official name: Carrigaphooca Castle
- Reference no.: 255

Carrigaphooca Castle (Irish: Caisleán Charraig a' Phúca meaning "castle on the rock of the fairy"; the word púca translates as ghost or fairy) is a ruined five storey rectangular tower house situated on a steep-sided rock overlooking the River Sullane. Carrigaphooca 6 km west of Macroom, County Cork, Ireland, in an area once known as Gleann na n-Dearg ("valley of the reds"). The tower dominates the landscape of Lissacresig (Fairyland) in Clondrohid, and Lower Shanballyshane, in Kilnamartyra. Carrigaphooca is made of sandstone and limestone and was built as a defensive tower by the MacCarthys of Muskerry in the early 15th century.

Carrigaphooca is positioned in an area rich with Neolithic monuments; Carrigaphooca Stone Circle lies two fields to the east, with a large standing stone (gallán) to the west. The tower is located on private property, and is no longer accessible to the public, although it is owned by the state and maintained by the Office of Public Works.

== History ==
Although named as a castle, Carrigaphooca was built as a defensive tower in the early 15th century. Some sources suggest that it was built by Dermot Mór MacCarthy of Drishane Castle, around the same time his brother, Cormac Laidir MacCarthy, was rebuilding Blarney Castle. The MacCarthys of Muskerry were a medieval Barony located mostly in the mid-Cork region. Although one of Ireland's greatest medieval dynasties, they lost large areas of the region in the 13th century which they were trying to recapture during the 15th century, when the castle was built.

Carrigaphooca's location on the route-way between Macroom and County Kerry gave it strategic importance. The MacCarthys were constantly engaged in internecine warfare and the tower was often attacked.

Cormac Teige McCarthy, the Lord of Blarney took refuge in the tower after he had sided with the Irish during the Siege of Kinsale in 1601. He stayed there until he was forgiven by Elizabeth I after he had written a personal letter of apology to her.

In 1602, the castle was attacked and taken by Donal Cam O'Sullivan Beare and another member of the extended McCarthy family. After a protracted siege, their forces broke through the outer wall and burned the timber door at the north face entrance. The defenders surrendered and were allowed to go free.

== Description ==
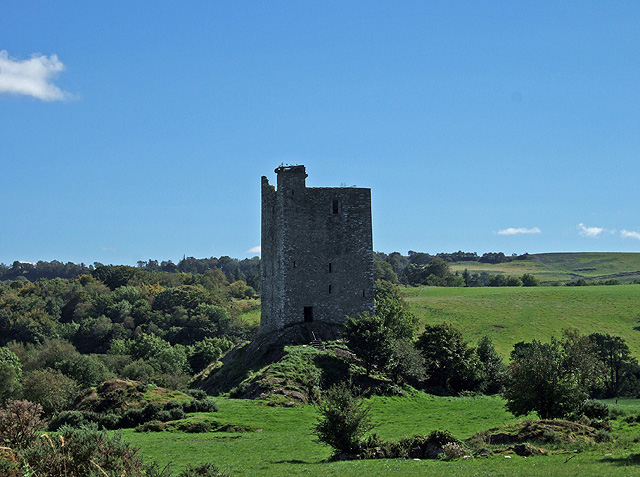
View of the entrance

The five storey tower is simple in design and positioned on a steep and high, jagged roche moutonnée, making approach for attackers difficult. The ground floor chamber is lit by small off-center windows, and is flanked by a straight mural stone stairs for 11 steps to the first floor. The stairs become spiral from the 2nd to the 4th floor level. In all the stairwell contains 54 steps. Although the ground floors of most contemporary towers were usually completely dark, Carrigaphooca's ground floor contains three windows, which are deeply recessed giving an appreciation of unusual thickness of the walls. The narrow windows are accessible to birds, particularly crows, who since the towers ruin, have dropped layers of twigs.

The building is a relatively simple design. There is one surviving window, located on eastern front and opposite the entrance to the 2nd floor, and which like the remains of the other windows, contains a fairly basic linteled block head. Carrigaphooca does not contain a fireplace, suggesting, according to a report by the Heritage Unit of Cork County Council, that it was "built more with protection in mind rather than comfort". According to the writer Barry O'Brien, Carrigaphooca was "in its day...quite a splendid building and must have offered considerable security to the besieged and a formidable challenge to the besiegers.

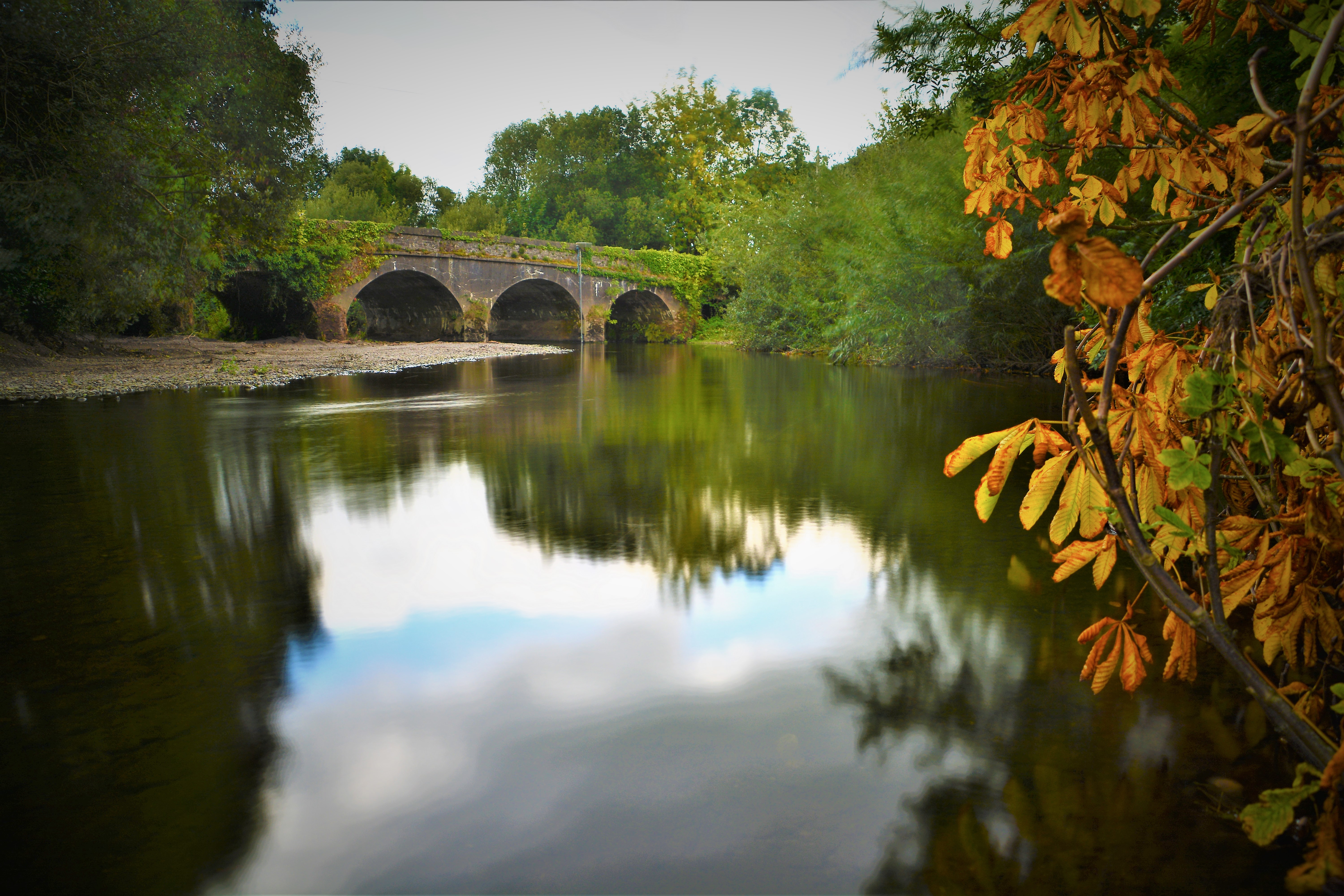
Carrigaphocca bridge

The top floor may have also contained living quarters, and perhaps a fireplace. The windows on the northern and southern walls are significantly larger than on the other floors and give a panoramic view of the surrounding valley, as well as the distant Killarney Paps and Mullaghanish.

The tower once contained two defensive outer walls, which are now lost and have left no traceable remains. It contains the remains of two corner bartizans on two opposite wall tops. They appear as projecting stone boxes with gaps that were used as protection by defenders when shooting downwards at attackers. The first floor consists of a single room which was probably used as quarters for the guards. The timbers bearing the floor were supported on still visible limestone carved corbels.

During the 1970s, the Office of Public Works undertook restoration of the site, and added a flight of steps leading over the rock base, joining with the main entrance. The restoration included the addition of narrow stepped turret to give access to the unguarded walk-way around the roof, although it was later blocked by a gate in the mid 1980s for safety reasons.
