= Macroom =

Town in County Cork, Ireland

Macroom Maigh Chromtha (Irish)
- Town
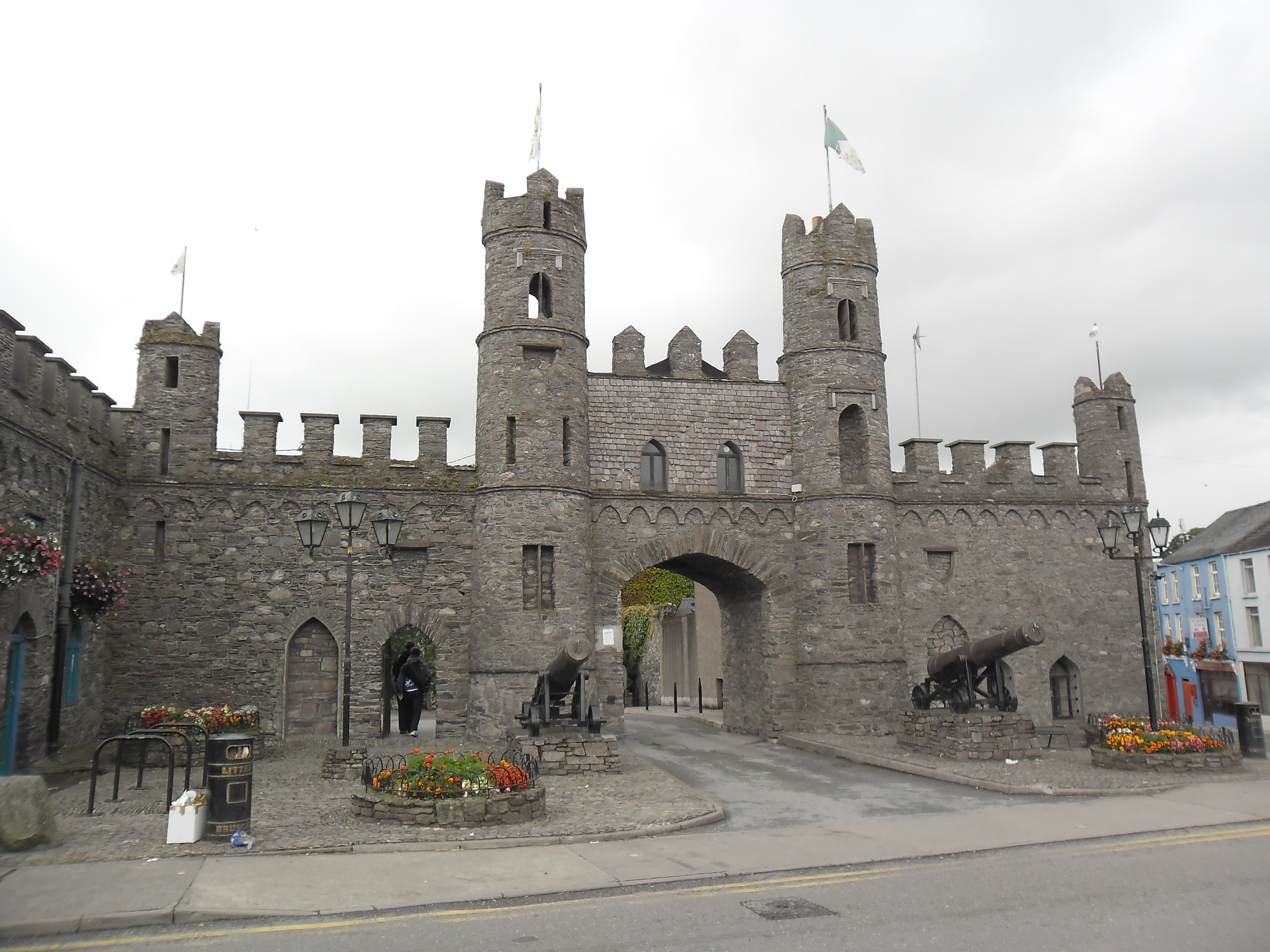
- Macroom Castle entrance and cannons

- Location in Ireland Macroom (Europe)
- Coordinates: 51°54′17″N 8°57′35″W
- Country: Ireland
- Province: Munster
- County: County Cork

Population (2022)
  - Total: 4,096
- Time zone: UTC±0 (WET)
  - Summer (DST): UTC+1 (IST)
- Eircode routing key: P12
- Telephone area code: +353(0)26
- Irish Grid Reference: W337729
- Website: macroom.ie

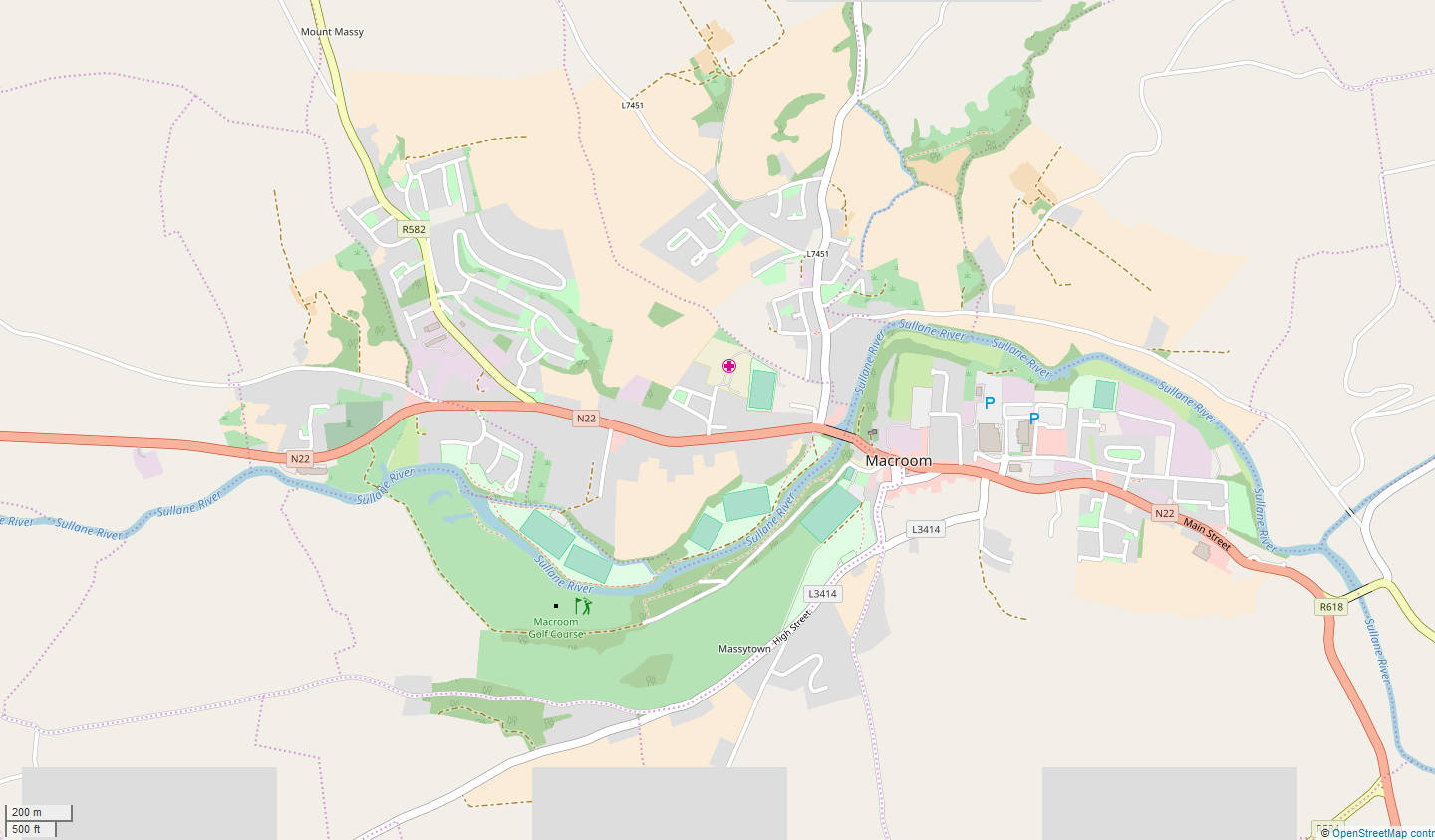
Map of the town

Macroom (/məˈkruːm/; Irish: Maigh Chromtha) is a market town in County Cork, Ireland, located in the valley of the River Sullane, halfway between Cork city and Killarney. Its population has grown and receded over the centuries as it went through periods of war, famine and workhouses, forced emigration and intermittent prosperity. The 2011 census gave an urban population of 3,879 people, while the 2016 census recorded 3,765 people. The town is in a civil parish of the same name.

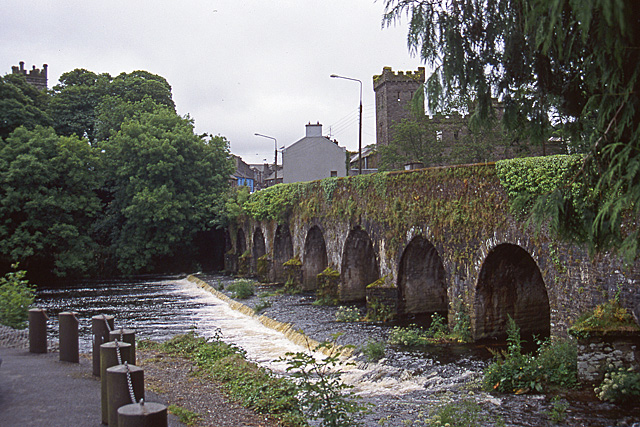
Bridge over the river Sullane, viewed from Masseytown

Macroom began as a meeting place for the druids of Munster. It is first mentioned is in 6th-century records, and the immediate area hosted a major battle c. 987 involving the Irish king Brian Boru. During the Middle Ages, the town was invaded by a succession of warring clans, including the Murcheatach Uí Briain and Richard de Cogan families. In the early modern period the MacCarthys took control and later the area found prosperity via milling. The MacCarthys built a series of tower houses, some of which survive. The family lost influence during the Williamite wars of the 1690s, after which authority over the town castle waxed and waned between the MacCarthys and a number of Anglo-Irish families.

The population fell in the 1840s during the Great Famine. Evidence can be found in the former workhouse, now the district hospital at the north side of New Street, and the mass graveyard to the west, near Clondrohid. During the late 18th and early 19th century, a number of Anglo-Irish families, and a branch of the Massey family, settled in the area. Many of their estate houses were burned in the period around the Irish War of Independence as the town was caught up in the turmoil of IRA activity.

Today the town is an economic hub for the mid-Cork region, and the location of a Danone milk processing factory, which dries and cans infant formula from milk supplied by local dairy farmers. Until the 1950s, New Street was the town's economic hub, and contained many small retail outlets.

== Name ==
Macroom's Irish language name, Maigh Chromtha, likely translates as 'crooked plain' in reference to the bend in the River Sullane on which its historic core is situated. It has also been suggested that it may translate as "meeting place of followers of the god Crom" or "crooked oak", the latter a reference to a large oak tree that apparently grew in the town-square during the reign of King John.

== History ==
=== Neolithic ===
The area around Macroom contains a number of Stone Age megaliths. This standing stone is part of a 3500-year-old complex in Knocknakilla between Macroom and Millstreet

Evidence of pre-history human activity in the Macroom area survives in the many Iron Age burial monuments; the area is unusually rich with standing stones, dolmens and stone circles. Later, in the early Dark Ages, Macroom seems to have been a centre for Bardic conventions and a base for the Druids of Munster. The first historical reference to Macroom dates from the 6th century, when the townland was known as Achad Dorbchon and held within the kingdom of Muscraighe Mitine.

The Eóganachta were then the dominant clan of Munster and held kingdoms from Muscraighe Mitine to the midlands town of Birr. At some point, they were replaced by the Uí Floinn, who commissioned a castle in Macroom so as to establish Raithleann as capital of Muskerry.

=== Middle Ages ===
Muscraighe Mitine underwent three invasions during the 13th century. The Murcheatach Uí Briain and Richard de Cogan arrived in 1201 and 1207 respectively; the MacCarthys became the dominant and most powerful family and held Macroom Castle until the mid-17th century. From the 14th century, Macroom became the capital of the Barony of Muskerry and the centre for trade, burial and religious worship. It was one of the earliest Irish milling centres, and from the end of the 16th century the town grew from a village to a functionally diverse urban centre. The locality grew outwards from the castle. The MacCarthys established the town as a centre for markets and fairs, and in 1620 a market house was built to the east of and facing the castle. The family introduced a plantation scheme which aimed to attract new agriculture and industrial techniques and methods to the area.

=== Modern period ===
By the mid-17th century, Anglo-Irish families owned approximately one-third of the town in value terms. The Protestant families introduced butter making, a labour-intensive industry. A 1750 tenement list details 134 buildings and 300 families, with a population ratio of 6 to 1 between Catholic and Protestants. The town had developed from a locality of mud cabins in the early 1660s to a linear shaped urban settlement of mainly thatched cabins, which were later replaced by solid cottages following a campaign by the Irish Land and Labour Association (ILLA). Macroom Castle was for a period owned by Admiral Sir William Penn, a Royal Navy officer and father of William Penn, after whom the U.S. state of Pennsylvania is named.

==== Battle of Macroom ====
The 1650 Battle of Macroom was waged as part of the Cromwellian conquest of Ireland, when English Parliamentarian forces led by Roger Boyle defeated an Irish Confederate force under David Roche. Bishop Boetius MacEgan, acting on behalf of the MacCarthys, failed to hold the castle. He was taken prisoner by Parliamentarian forces and executed by hanging at Carrigadrohid.

==== Irish War of Independence ====
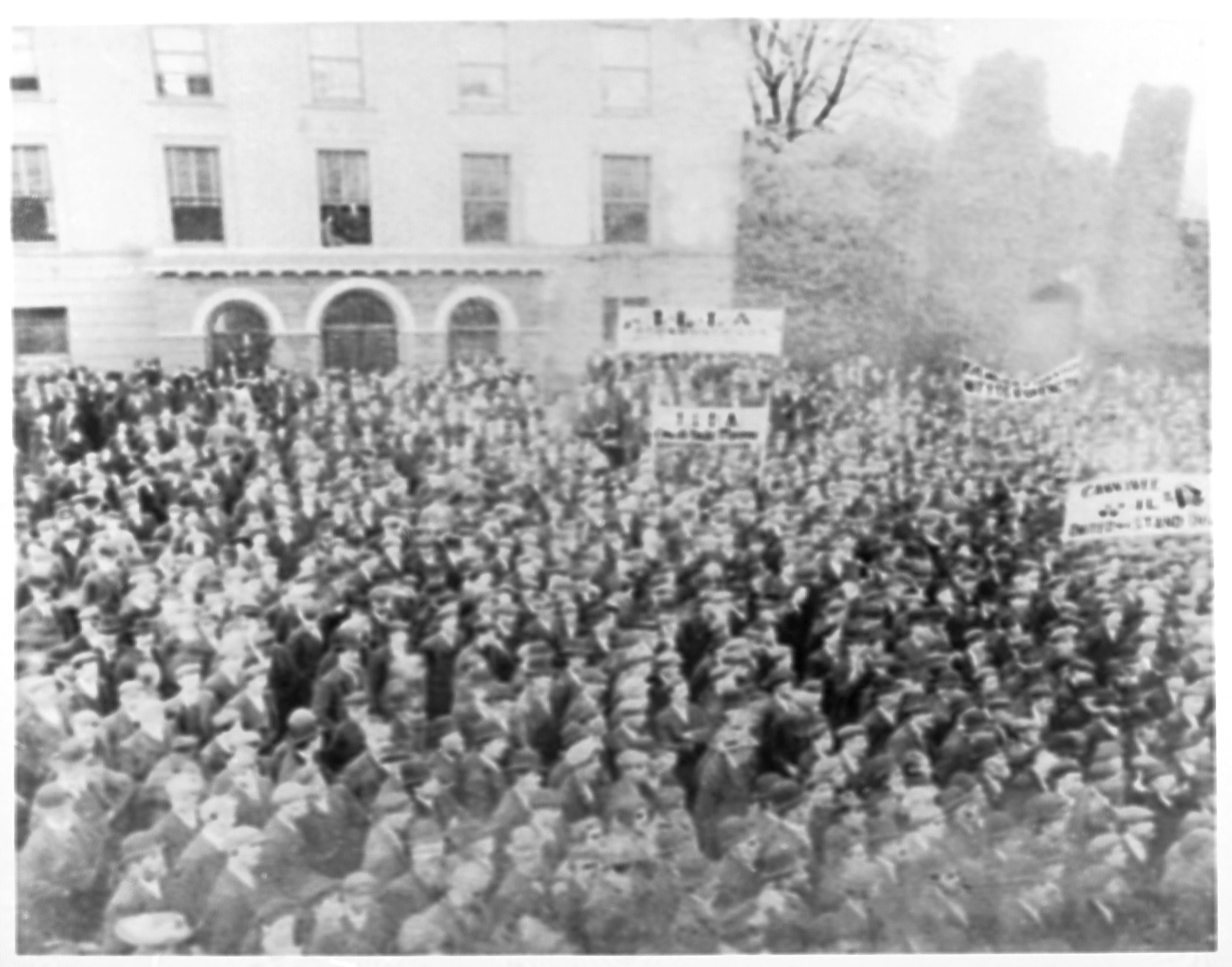
c. 1894 mass meeting, organised by the ILLA supported by small tenant farmers and agrarian labourers in the Market Square

Macroom was the main base in Cork for the Auxiliary Division of the Royal Irish Constabulary (RIC) during the Irish War of Independence. The Irish Republican Army (IRA) was highly active in the county, especially in the areas around Macroom, Bandon and Dunmanway. RIC policemen in the town described the area as "practically in a state of war". After a series of burnings of local RIC barracks and courthouses a curfew was imposed on the town, with a ban on public meetings and market fairs. A local IRA volunteers wrote of a "hinterland unpoliced and unwatched". Local RIC policemen felt they had lost control and the Auxiliaries were called to reinforce them. The townspeople of Macroom treated the Auxiliaries with hostility, and there were instances of their patrols being stoned. The British were embroiled in a guerrilla battle in the Muskerry hills, coming under fire from the Ballyvourney IRA cell, and lost three men – two of them officers – in one attack.

On 28 November 1920 at Kilmichael, on the road between Macroom and Dunmanway, a convoy consisting of 18 Auxiliaries in two lorries were ambushed by IRA volunteers from the 3rd Cork Brigade under the command of Tom Barry. 16 Auxiliaries were killed and 1 wounded, while the IRA suffered no casualties. After the ambush, the Auxiliaries increased their mistreatment of the County Cork populace, and martial law was declared in the counties of Cork, Kerry, Limerick and Tipperary, which led Macroom to fall under martial law for a period of time. Macroom Castle was burned out on five occasions; the last occasion was on 18 August 1922, following the evacuation of the Auxiliaries from the town. Volunteers from the anti-treaty IRA retreated from Cork City to Macroom, burning the castle before leaving during the Irish Civil War.

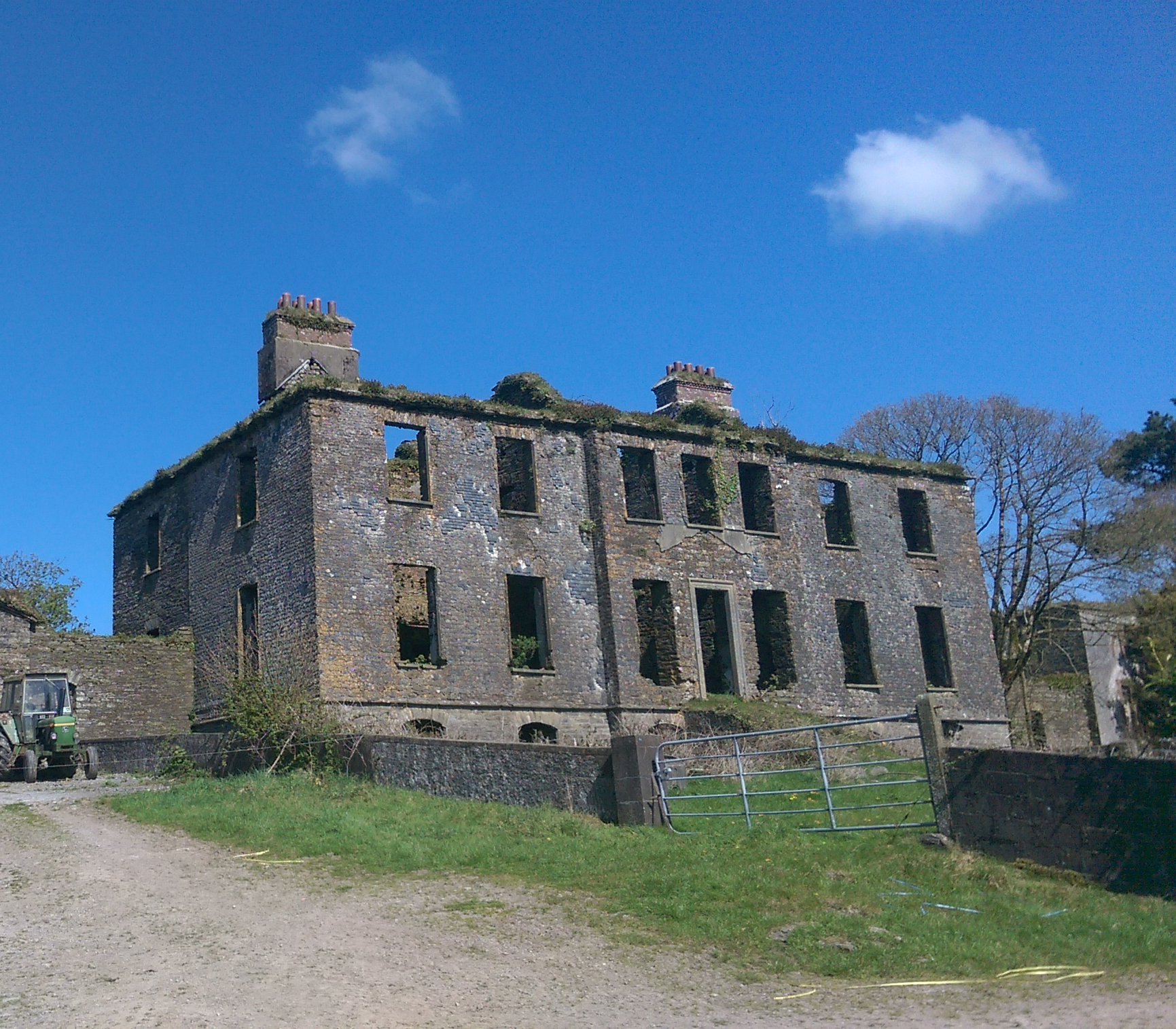
The ruined home of the Cork branch of the Massey family, burned out and abandoned during the War of Independence. The hill on which it is located is known as "Mount Massey".

Mount Massey, which is now ruined, was the 18th and 19th century home of the members of the Massey family, and is located north by Kilnagurteen and gave the townland of Masseytown its name. The family were major landowners with land covering 13,363 acres, extending from Clondrohid to Drishane. During the 19th century, the family tried to temper growing Irish nationalist sentiment by sponsoring the local town fair. Later their home and estate was besieged and burnt in December 1920 by IRA volunteers during the Irish War of Independence.

IRA volunteer and politician Michael Collins was killed in 1922 in an ambush at nearby Béal na Bláth. Lady Olivia Ardilaun, a descendant of the MacCarthys, and widow of Lord Ardilaun, sold the castle demesne in 1924 to a group of local businessmen, which they put in trust for the town.

== Geography and climate ==
Macroom was built on the River Sullane, a tributary of the River Lee. Its hinterland lies on a valley at the foot of the Boggeragh Mountains. The town stretches for about 2 miles (3.2 km) and largely consists of two long streets, Main Street and New Street, divided by the Ten Arch Bridge, which also leads off to the suburb of Massey Town, further towards the village of Ballinagree and the Boggeragh Mountains.

Like the rest of Ireland, the climate is temperate maritime, very even and heavily influenced by the North Atlantic Current, resulting in mild winters and cool summers. Weather in Macroom is mild, usually warm, temperate and humid, with significant rainfall throughout the year, averaging at 1164 mm. Rain falls on average around 21 days of each month, peaking in December (average 24 days), and falling off slightly in June (average 21 days). Snow is uncommon; it tends to fall in January or February, for an average of 2–3 days per year. Wind speeds vary from c 80 km/h average in winter, to 50–52 in summer. The mean temperature is 10.1 °C.

== Economy ==
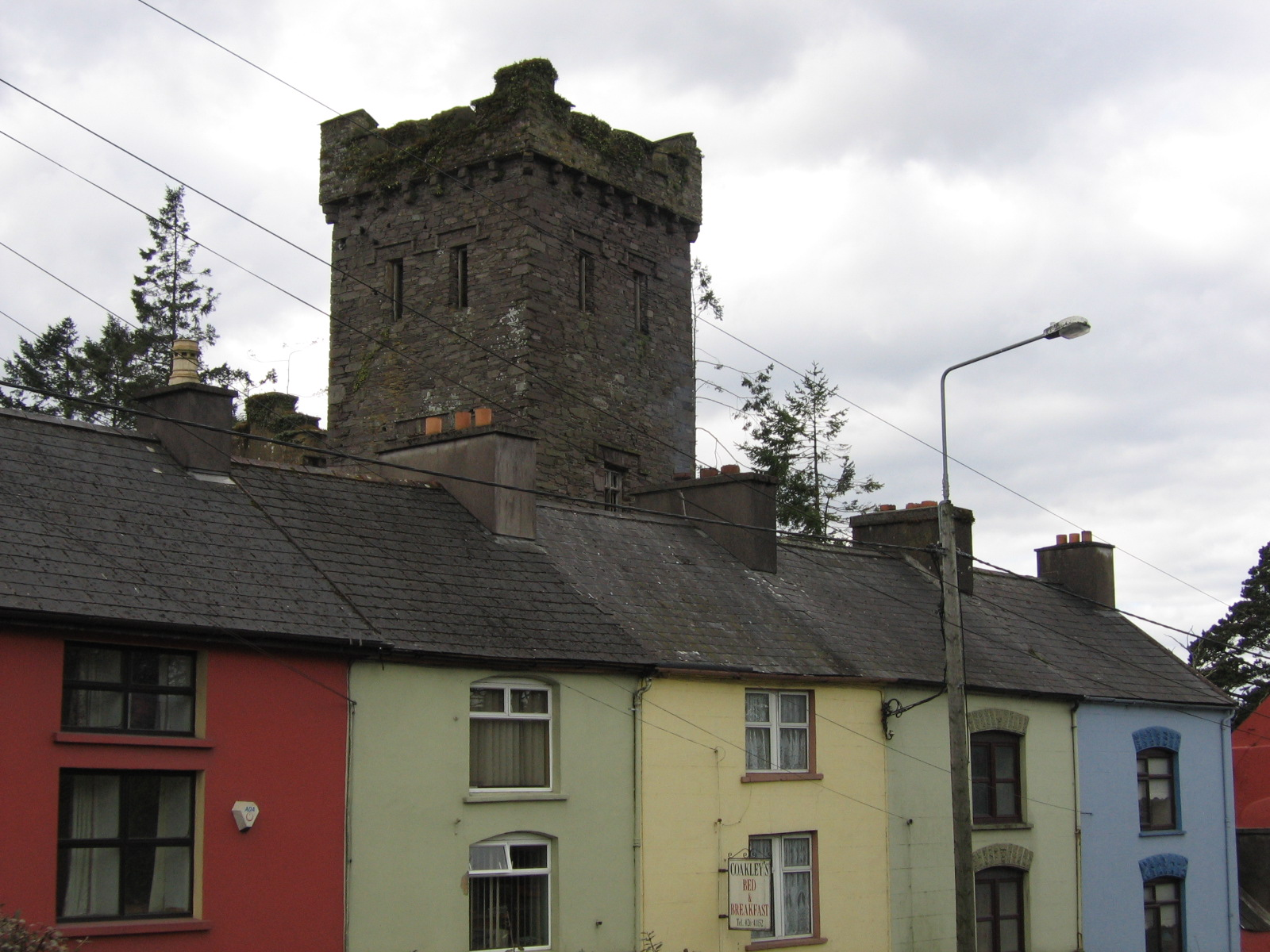
Castle Street, with tower in background

The economy is primarily agricultural, with local dairy farmers being members of the Dairygold co-operative. Their milk is dried or evaporated in Mitchelstown as skim milk or whey concentrate, and eventually supplied to the local Danone plant, which produces infant formula for a worldwide market.

=== Tourism ===
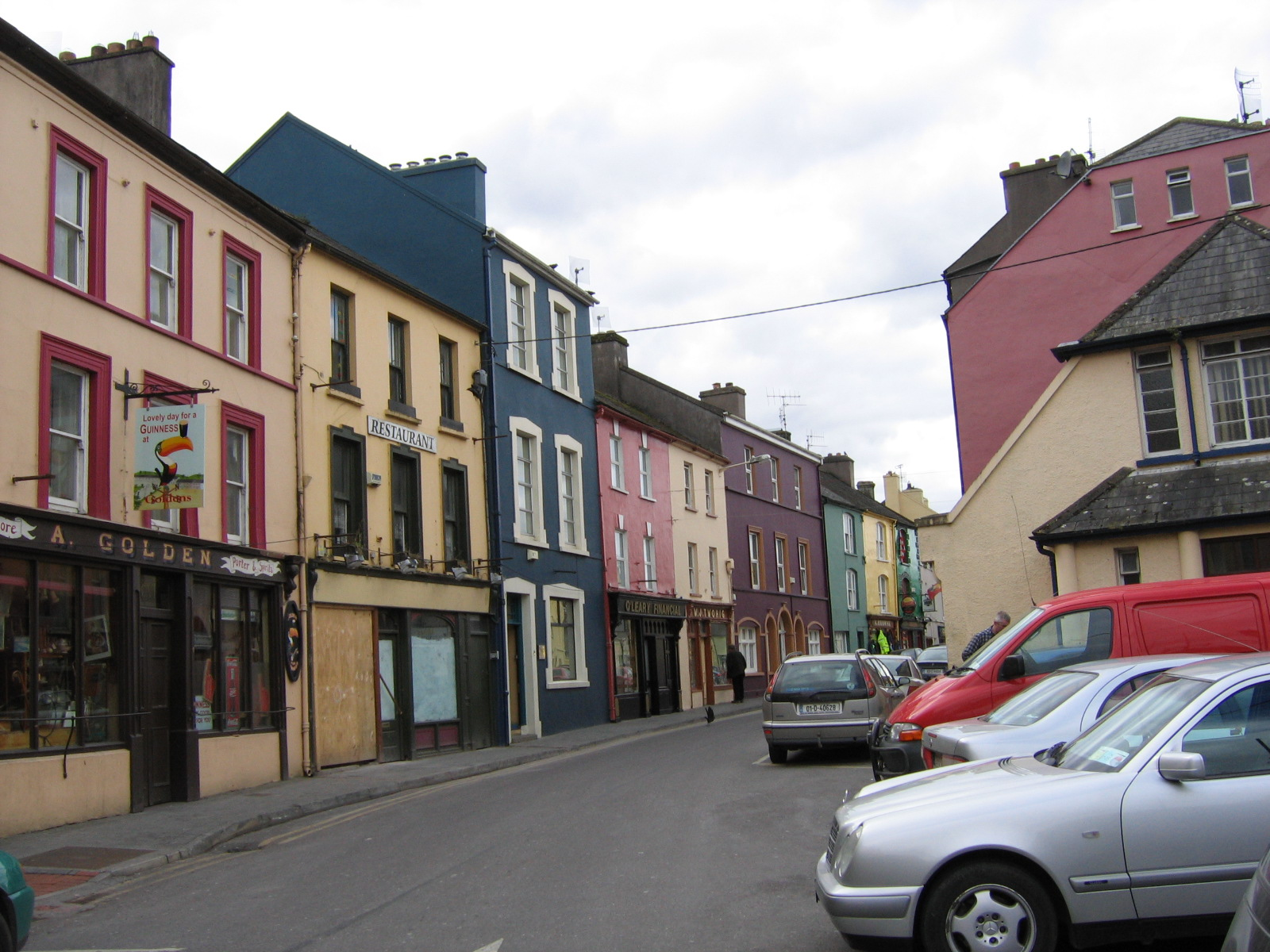
View of the back square, showing the late Gerard Golden's public house

Tourist attractions include the town centre, an 18-hole golf course, and the Castle Grounds, with fishing and golfing grounds. The town's surroundings contain large amounts of megalithic monuments, early Christian holy wells, churches and sacred sites associated with ancient visionaries and healers. Mushera mountains are located a few kilometres to the north of the town, near Millstreet Country Park. It contains the ancient Saint John's Well.

The Castle Arch, the centerpiece of the old castle grounds, admits walkers to the demesne parklands. It is held in trust to, and in the possession of the people of Macroom. Its large park contains riverside walks among mature oak and beech trees.

==== The Gearagh ====
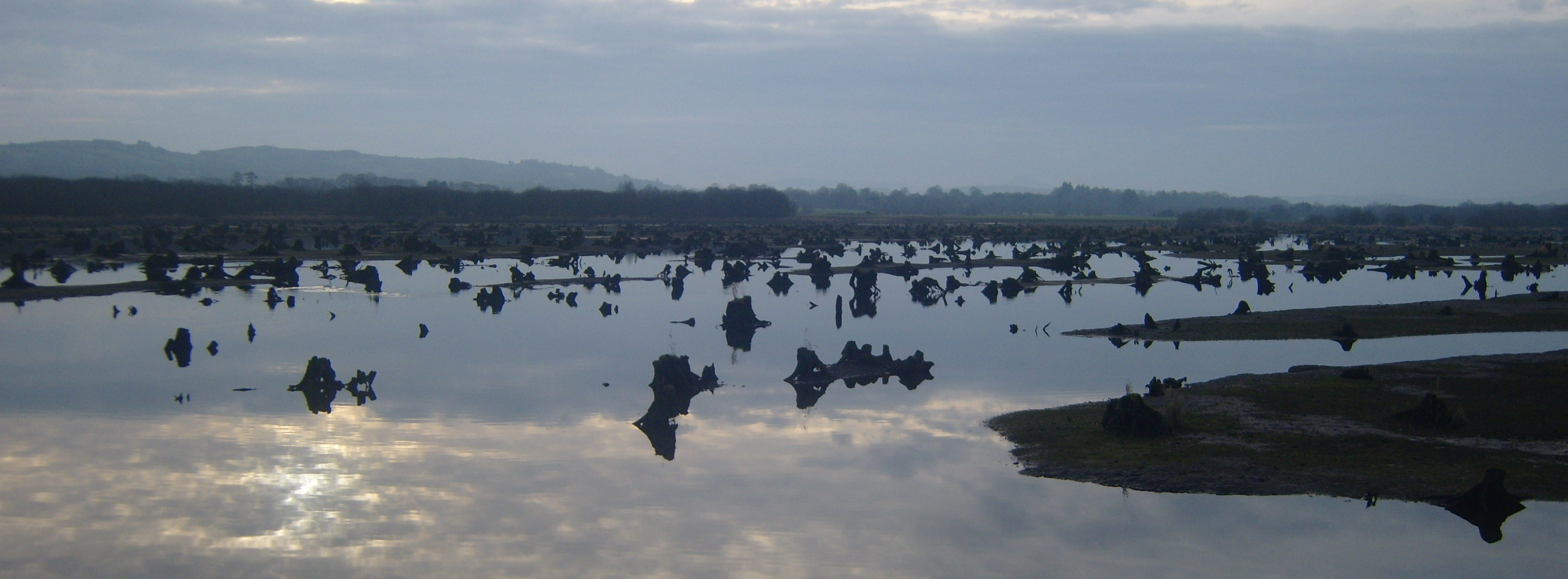
The Gearagh, a submerged oakwood forest 1.5 km east of the town

The Gearagh is a national nature reserve on an inland delta, is located 1.5 kilometres (0.93 mi) south of Macroom. It comprises a series of small islands, separated by anastomosing, mostly flat, river channels or streams, and is bounded by Toon Bridge, Illaunmore, and Anahala Bridge. The area is thought to have been wooded since the end of the last Ice Age c. 8,000 BC. The alluvial woodland extended as far as the Lee Bridge, and consisted of a large number of mature oak and ash trees.

The reserve was gutted in 1954 when the Lee hydro-electric scheme led to extensive tree-felling and flooding. Now submerged houses are visible from the area around Two Mile Bridge. The scheme resulted in the loss of sixty percent of the former oak woodland. Today, the Gearagh is of interest and importance due to its rich and rare diversity of wildlife, and represents the only extant extensive alluvial woodland in Western Europe.

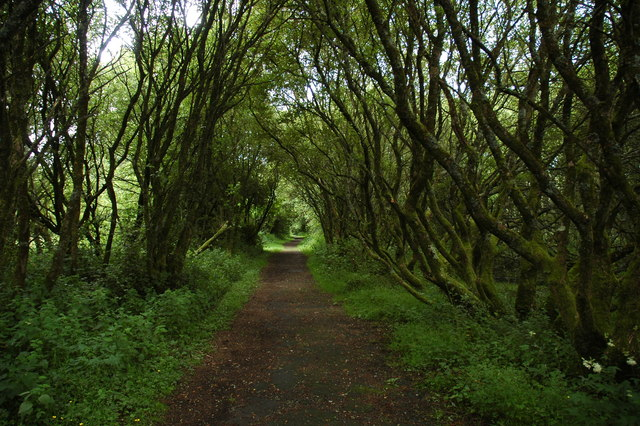
Main pathway from the entrance

The Gearagh is primarily of interest and importance due to its rich and rare diversity of wildlife, and it represents the only extant extensive alluvial woodland in Western Europe. It hosts numerous rare plant species including marsh marigold, meadowsweet and nightshade, and 62 species of moss and liverwort. While oak and ash trees once pre-dominated, today there are a number of willow and alder trees on the higher islands and inlets. It hosts a large diversity of birds and wildfowl and attracts both summer and winter migrants. Examples include mallards, wigeon, Greylag geese, herons and coots. It also hosts Atlantic salmon and the near extinct freshwater pearl mussel. The area is protected under the international Ramsar Convention.

Today the Gearagh comprises wide but shallow water enclosing a series of small islands separated by anastomosing, mostly flat, river streams. It supports a diverse ecological system of plants, birds and fish, including freshwater pearl mussel, Atlantic salmon, whooper swans, kingfishers and otters.

==== Carrigaphooca Castle ====
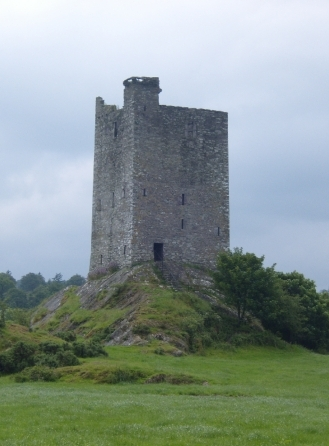
Carrigaphooca Castle from the north east

Carrigaphooca Castle is a ruined five storey rectangular tower house situated on a steep-sided rock overlooking the River Sullane. It is located 6 km west of Macroom, in an area once known as Gleann na n-Dearg (Valley of the Reds). The tower dominates the landscape of Lissacresig (Fairyland) in Clondrohid, and Lower Shanballyshane, in Kilnamartyra. Carrigaphooca is made of sandstone and limestone and was built as a defensive tower by MacCarthy clan member Donal MacCarthy of Drishane c. 1336–1351. Cormac Teige MacCarthy, the Lord of Blarney took refuge in the tower after he had sided with the Irish during the Siege of Kinsale in 1601. He stayed there until he was forgiven by Elizabeth I after he had written a personal letter of apology to her. In 1602, the castle was attacked and taken by Donal Cam O'Sullivan Beare and another member of the extended McCarthy family. After a protracted siege, their forces broke through the outer wall and burned the timber door at the north face entrance. The defenders surrendered and were allowed to go free.

Carrigaphooca is positioned in an area rich with Neolithic monuments; a stone circle lies two fields to the east. The tower is located on private property, and no longer accessible to the public, although it is owned by the state and maintained by the Office of Public Works.

==== Mountain Dew festival ====
From 1976 to 1982 Macroom hosted the annual Macroom Mountain Dew Festival, organised by young local business people. The festivals attracted up to 20,000 attendees each year, with lineups that included Rory Gallagher, Thin Lizzy and Van Morrison. It was the first of its kind for Ireland, and was intended to reinvigorate a town that was then stagnant economically. According to one of the organisers, Martin Fitzgerald, "The town needed a bit of shake rattle and roll to tempt not just international investors but Irish people to rest there a bit long...a rock concert fitted the bill". Line ups included Rory Gallagher, Phil Lynott, Elvis Costello Van Morrison, Marianne Faithfull and Horslips, and was attended by John Lydon of the Sex Pistols.

== Churches ==
According to the 2011 census, the urban population of 3,879 included 3,535 people identifying as Roman Catholic. The town's Catholic church, dedicated to St. Coleman, was built in 1841. It was remodeled in 1893, based on a design by Dominic Coakley.

Macroom's Church of Ireland building was constructed in 1823 on foot of a loan of £1000 from the Board of Fruits. The building is now derelict, although the graveyard is still in use. The remains of a thatched-chapel lies to the west of the town, on Lackaduduv mountain. A rare surviving form, the remnants are known locally as "Carrignaspirroge Chapel".

== Transport ==
Macroom is on the national primary route N22, approximately 38 km from Cork city and 48 km from Killarney. The nearest airport is Cork Airport.

A railway ran between the town and Cork city from 1866 to 1953, terminating in the mart grounds. By 1890 there were five services each way on weekdays and two on Sundays, with the running time taking just over an hour. Macroom railway station opened on 12 May 1866; it closed for passenger traffic on 1 July 1935 and for goods traffic on 10 March 1947, and was finally closed on 1 December 1953. In November 2023, the Macroom Bypass was opened after construction had begun in 2020.

== Education ==
The town has two primary and three secondary schools: a De La Salle secondary school for boys, the St. Mary's Secondary School (Sisters of Mercy) for girls, and McEgan College, a mixed technical college located in the castle grounds.

The Convent of Mercy school is situated within the Sisters of Mercy's complex attached to St. Colman's Church, and also includes a convent, primary school, graveyard and grotto.

Coláiste De La Salle was opened in 1933 and originally located in Macroom Town Hall, until a permanent building was completed three years later. By the late 1970s the school was experiencing severe capacity issues and a re-structure and extension of the school was undertaken in 1982. Since its opening the ratio of pupils has remained relatively stable with 40% coming from the town and the rest from surrounding parishes.

A new building was constructed in 2008 for St Colman's Boys National School after years of planning applications and appeals.

== Notable people ==
- Rena Buckley (b. 1986/1987), the GAA's most decorated player, with 18 All-Ireland Medals.
- Eibhlín Dubh Ní Chonaill (c. 1743–c. 1800), a member of the Gaelic nobility of Ireland, the composer of Caoineadh Airt Uí Laoghaire and widow of Art Ó Laoghaire.
- Donal Creed (1924–2017), Fine Gael politician; MEP, Teachta Dála, Minister of State under Garret FitzGerald
- Michael Creed (b. 1963), former Minister for Agriculture, Food and the Marine
- Denis Cotter, celebrity chef-owner of Paradiso restaurant in Cork
- Dermot Desmond (b. 1950), businessman and seventh-richest person in Ireland
- Ann Kelleher, a vice-president at Intel
- Art Ó Laoghaire (1746–1773), a member of the Gaelic nobility of Ireland and a captain in the Hungarian Hussars. He was outlawed under the Penal Laws for refusing to sell his horse to a Protestant for a paltry sum and was shot thereafter.
- Peadar Ua Laoghaire (1839–1920), Roman Catholic priest and author in Munster Irish during the Gaelic revival; born in the nearby parish of Clondrohid.
- Michael O'Leary (d. 1961), recipient of the Victoria Cross during the First World War.
- Rita Lynch (1914–2009), soprano
- Jimmy MacCarthy (b. 1953), singer/songwriter
- Morgan McSweeney (b. 1977), Downing Street Chief of Staff for the Starmer ministry (2024–2026)
- John A. Murphy (1927–2022), historian, former senator, former Emeritus Professor of History at University College Cork
- T. J. Murphy (1893–1949), Labour Party politician
- T. C. Murray (1873–1959), playwright born on New Street, Macroom; some of his works were performed on Broadway.
- Timothy Quill (1901–1960), Labour Party politician and co-operator
- Bambie Thug (b.1993), singer-songwriter and Irish representative in the Eurovision Song Contest 2024

== Gallery ==
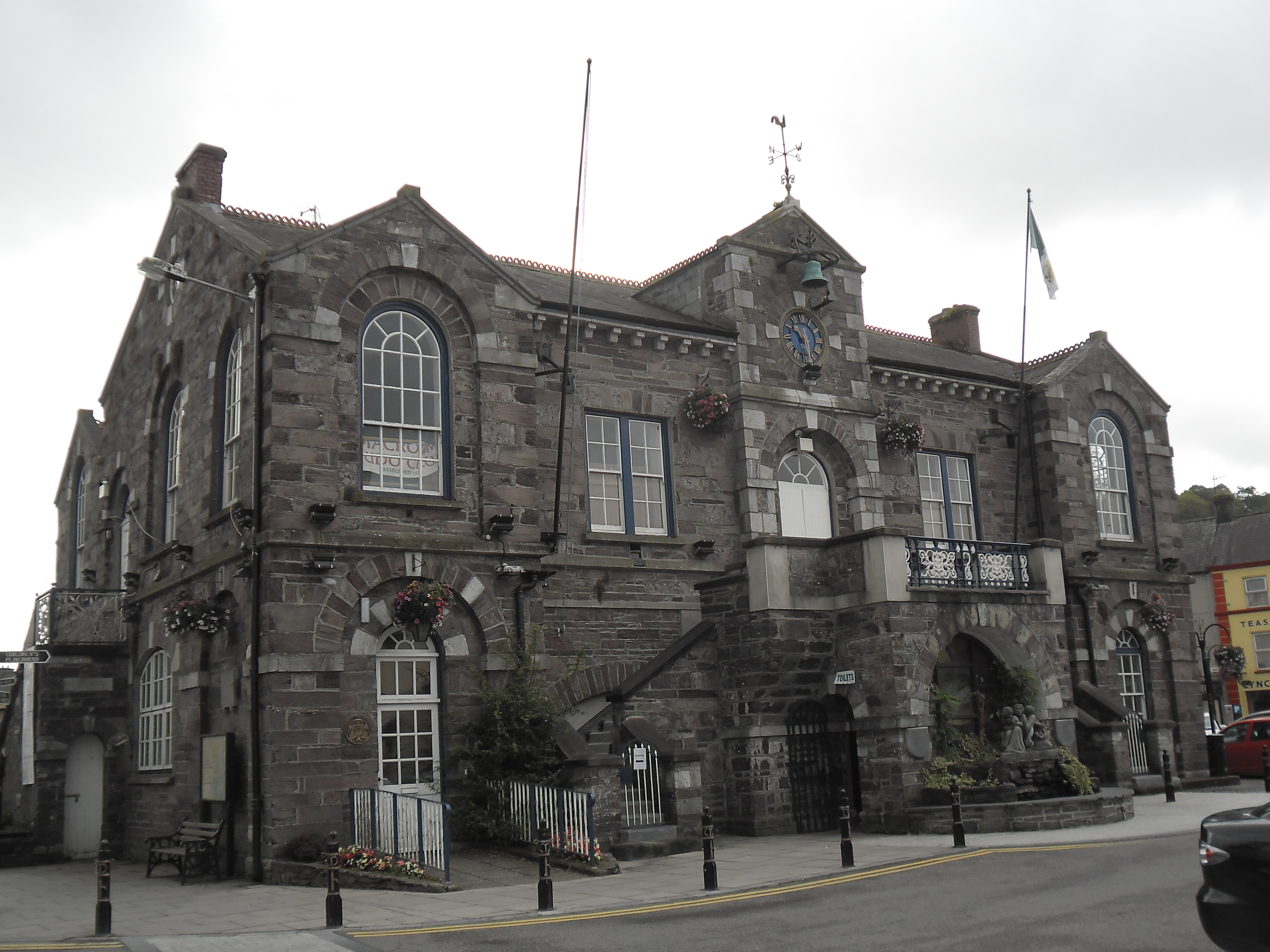
Macroom Town Hall was built for £1,000 in 1900 on premises purchased from Lady Ardilaun (born at the castle in 1850) two years before. The first phase of work on the building was completed in 1904.

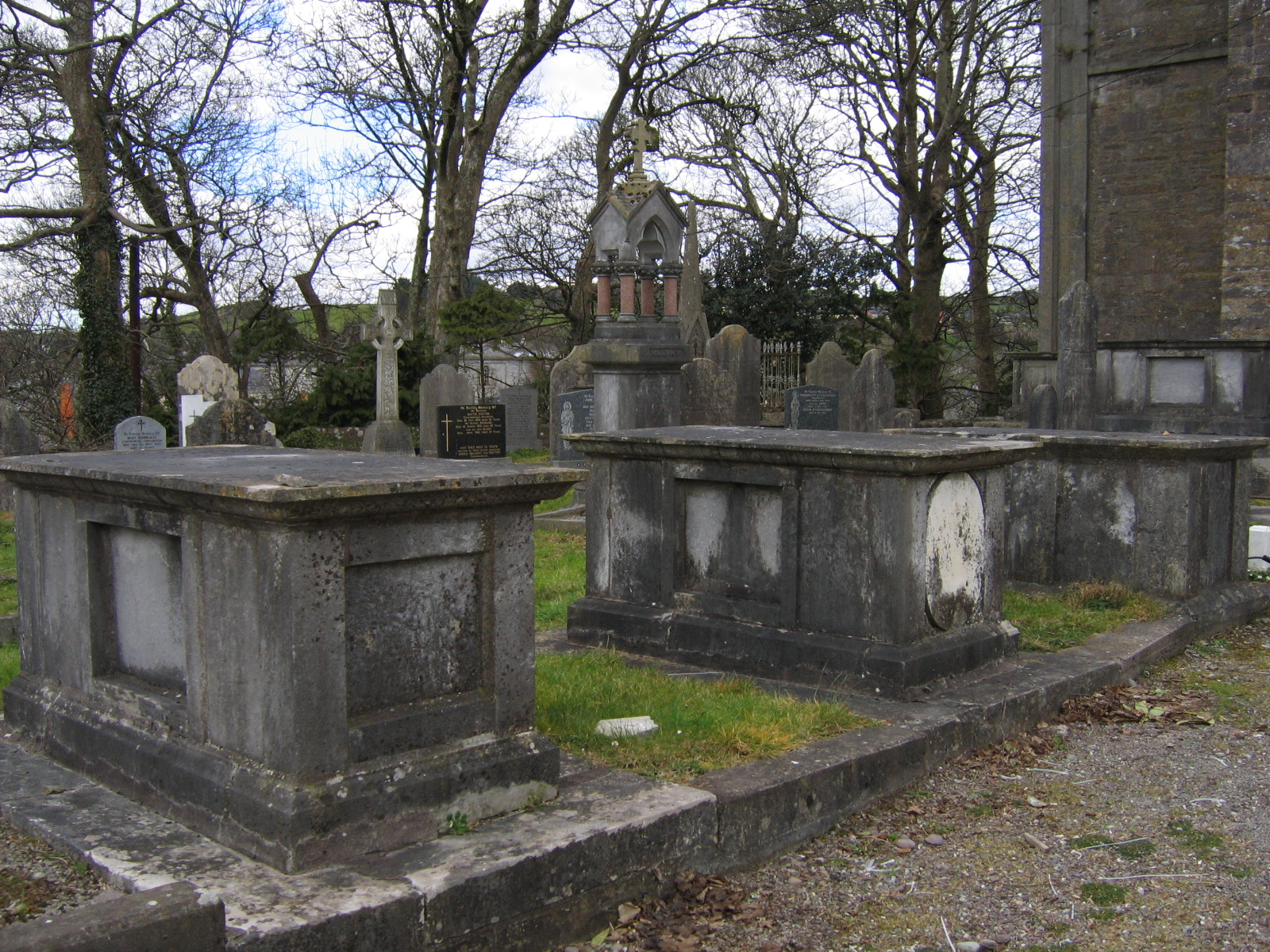
Graveyard in the Church of Ireland churchyard

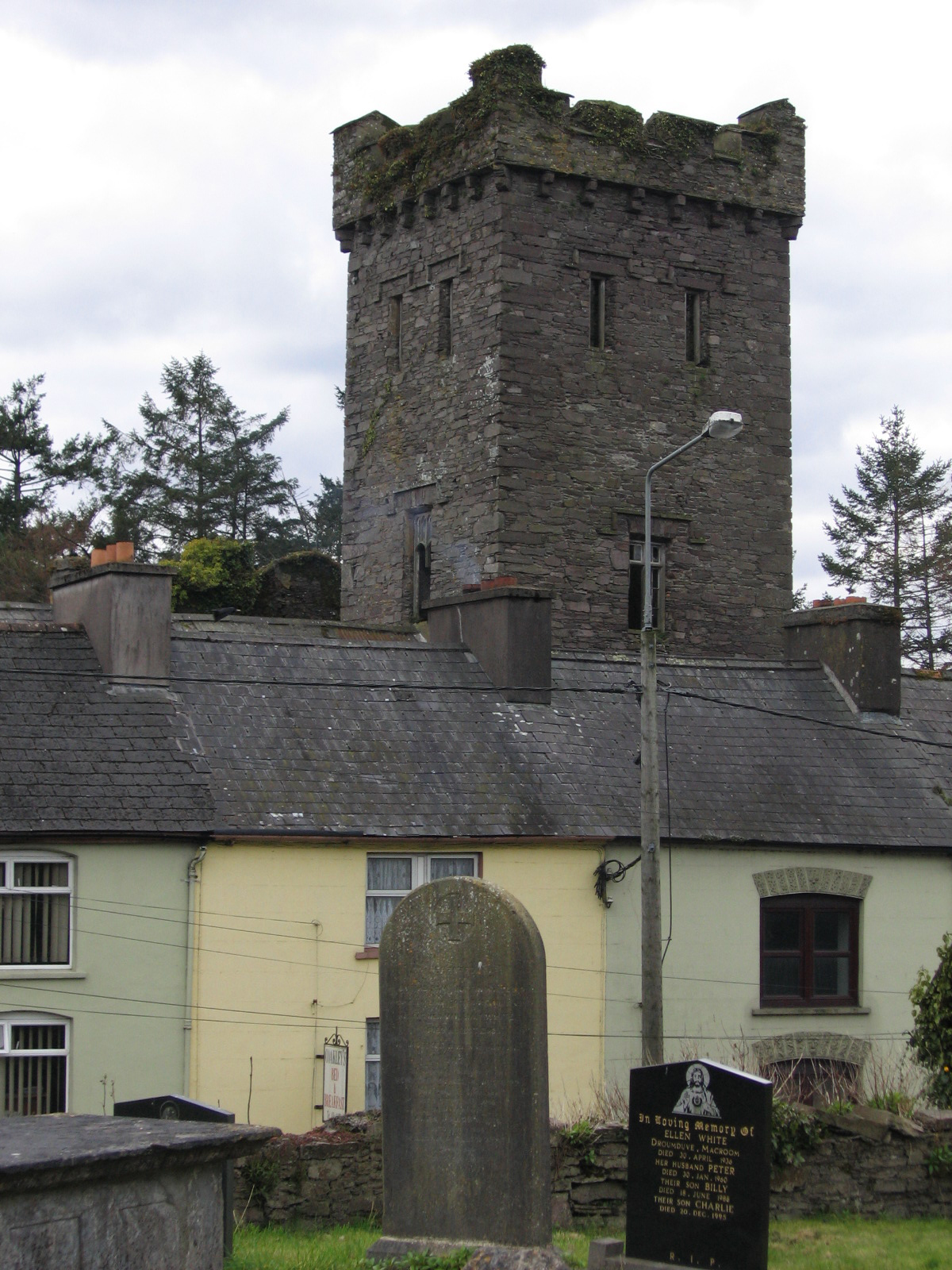
Street houses on bridge street, with the castle ruins in background

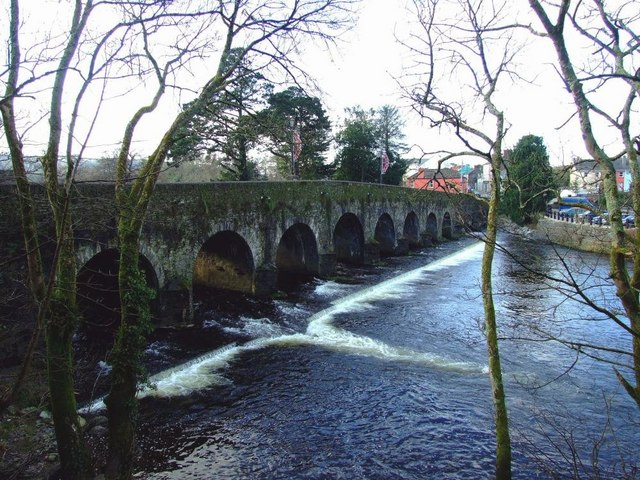
Bridge over the Sullane

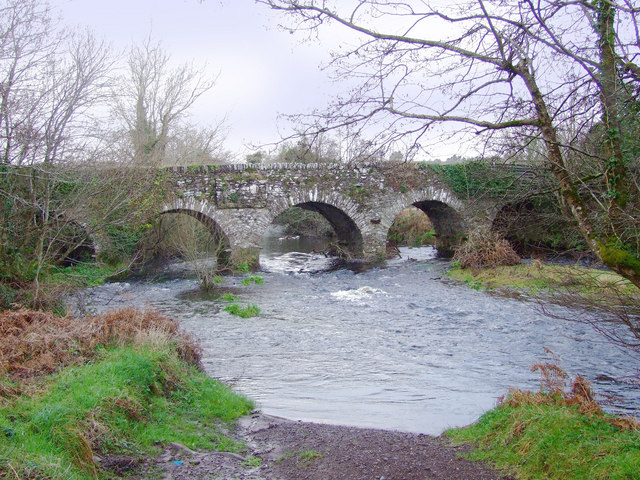
Morris's Bridge, Dromduff

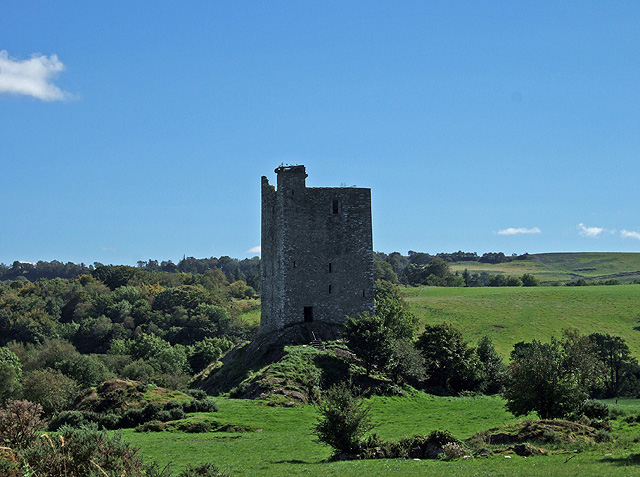
The MacCarthy tower house, Carrigaphooca Castle, built c. 1436
