= Macroom Town Hall =

Municipal building in Macroom, County Cork, Ireland

- Halla an Bhaile Maigh Chromtha
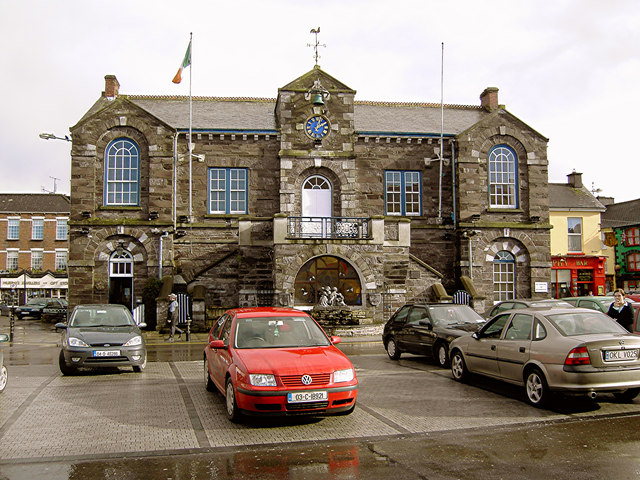
- Macroom Town Hall

- Location within County Cork

General information
- Architectural style: Neoclassical style
- Location: West Square, Macroom, Ireland
- Coordinates: 51.9047°N 8.9598°W
- Completed: 1904

Design and construction
- Architect: Albert William Barnard

Macroom Town Hall (Irish: Halla an Bhaile Maigh Chromtha) is a municipal building in West Square at Macroom, County Cork, Ireland. It is currently used by Cork County Council for the delivery of local services.

== History ==
The original market house in the town was commissioned by the McCarthy family in 1620. In 1703, much of the McCarthy family property, including the market house, was sold at auction to the "Hollow Sword Blades Company" which sold it on to Judge Francis Bernard and, from him, it was passed down through the Earls of Bandon, whose seat was at Bernard Castle. The right to hold markets was confirmed by Queen Anne on 30 September 1713.

When a militia party of 15 United Irishmen, led by Malachi Duggan, raided Codrum House, the local home of Colonel Robert Hutchinson, of the Muskerry Blue Light Dragoons, on 19 April 1799, the raid went badly wrong, and Hutchinson got shot. The 15 men were arrested and tried for murder. Three men were found guilty of murder, sentenced to be hanged, drawn and quartered and their remains placed on spikes above the market house.

After the original building became dilapidated, the market house was rebuilt in rubble masonry around 1820. In the late 19th century the town commissioners, who had been appointed in accordance with the provisions of the Towns Improvement (Ireland) Act 1854, decided to convert the market house for municipal use. The local landowner, Olivia Charlotte Guinness, Baroness Ardilaun, agreed to make the site available for the purpose. In 1899, the town commissioners were replaced by an urban district council, with the new council taking over responsibility for the conversion works. The conversion was carried out by Buckley Bros, Ovens, at a cost of £1,320 to a design by Albert William Barnard and was completed in late 1904.

The design involved a symmetrical main frontage of five bays facing onto West Square with the end bays projected forward as pavilions. The central bay, which was also projected forward, featured a slightly recessed round headed doorway with voussoirs and a balcony on the first floor, which was accessed by external staircases on either side of the central bay. Above the doorway, there was a clock surmounted by a triangular pediment. The bays flanking the central bay were fenestrated by bi-partite windows on the first floor, while the outer bays were fenestrated by round headed windows with voussoirs on both floors.

A unit of Auxiliary Division cadets who had been resting in the billiard room at the town hall were slightly injured when a bomb was hurled through the window by Irish Volunteers in March 1921. A memorial, in the form of a cross on a pedestal, intended to commemorate the lives of soldiers of the Irish Republican Army who fought in the Irish War of Independence, was unveiled on a site to the southwest of the town hall, after the end of the war. A school, De La Salle College (Irish: Coláiste De La Salle), was opened in temporary accommodation in the town hall in 1933 and remained there until a permanent building was completed off New Street three years later.

A sculpture of two parents and their two children entitled "The Family" was unveiled by President Mary Robinson on 24 February 1996. A shield to commemorate her visit was installed on the front of the town hall. Another shield to commemorate the award of the Freedom of the Town to the financier, Dermot Desmond, was installed on the front of the town hall on 21 June 1998. The building continued to be used as the offices of the urban district council until 2002, and then as the offices of the successor town council. The building ceased to be the local seat of government in 2014, when the council was dissolved and administration of the town was amalgamated with Cork County Council in accordance with the Local Government Reform Act 2014.
