= Carrigaphooca Stone Circle =

Stone circle in County Cork, Ireland

- Liagchiorcal Charraig an Phúca (Irish)
- Location within Ireland
- 51.90959°N 9.02499°W
- Type: stone circle
- Location: Carrigaphooca, Clondrohid, County Cork, Ireland

History
- Built: 1700–800 BC

Site notes
- Elevation: 80 m (260 ft)

National monument of Ireland
- Official name: Carrigaphooca
- Reference no.: 255

Carrigaphooca Stone Circle is a stone circle and National Monument located in County Cork, Ireland. It is situated 4.4 km (2.7 mi) west of Macroom, immediately east of Carrigaphooca Castle, north of the N22, and near the confluence of the River Sullane and River Foherish. The name means "stone of the púca" (ghost or fairy).

There were five stones: four standing and one inclined, but now only three remain. The circle's diameter was approximately 5.5 m (18 ft).
