= Macroom Mountain Dew Festival =

Music festival in Ireland

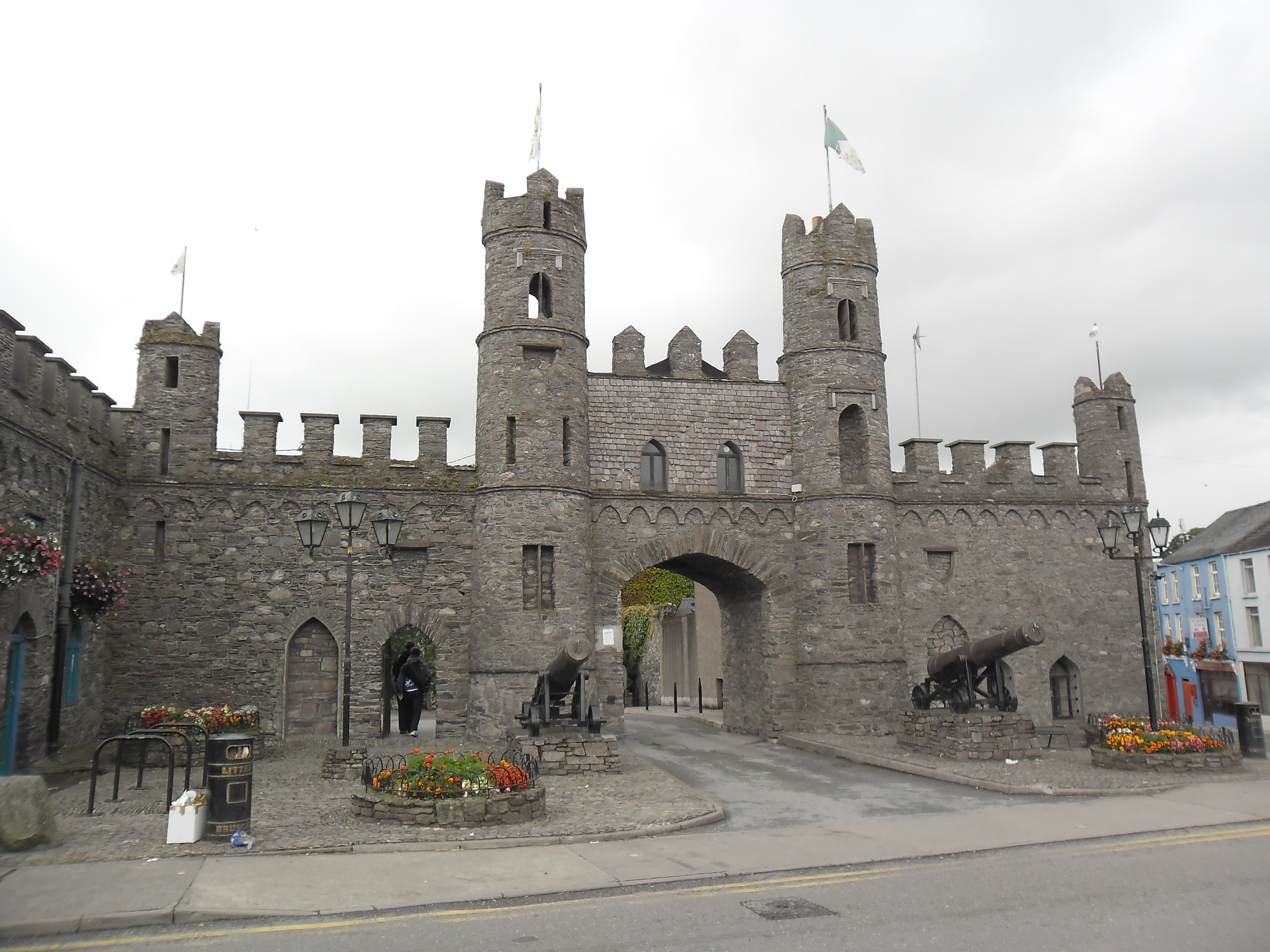
- Macroom Castle, site of most of the Mountain Dew festivals
- Genre: Rock
- Dates: Typically late June or July
- Locations: Macroom Castle, Macroom, County Cork, Ireland
- Coordinates: 51°54′19″N 8°57′44″W
- Years active: 1976–1982
- Attendance: Up to 20,000

Macroom Mountain Dew Festival was a music festival in Ireland, which was held between 1976 and 1982. Taking place in the grounds of a 19th-century castle in County Cork, it is considered to have been the first rock festival in Ireland.

== History ==
The festival is named for Macroom's reputation as a centre for production of poitín ("mountain dew"). Its organisation was spearheaded by publican and undertaker John Martin Fitz-Gerald, who approached Rory Gallagher’s brother and manager, Donal, about staging the open air concert.

Year	1976	1977	1978	1979	1980	1981	1982
Venue	Macroom GAA	Macroom Castle	Macroom Castle	Not held	Macroom Castle	a site 1 mile outside Macroom town	Coolcower House
Main acts	Horslips; Marianne Faithfull; Julie Felix	Rory Gallagher; Roland Van Campenhout; Joe O'Donnell; Nutz	Rory Gallagher; The Cimarons; Joe O'Donnell	Not held	Van Morrison; Mike Oldfield; Lindisfarne; Paul Brady; The Chieftains; Christy Moore; Davey Arthur	Elvis Costello and the Attractions; The Blues Band; Scullion; Paul Brady; Q-Tips; The Undertones; The Pretenders; Wishbone Ash	Roy Harper; Phil Lynott; Moving Hearts; Freddie White
