= Clondrohid =

Village in County Cork, Ireland

Clondrohid Cluain Droichead
- Village
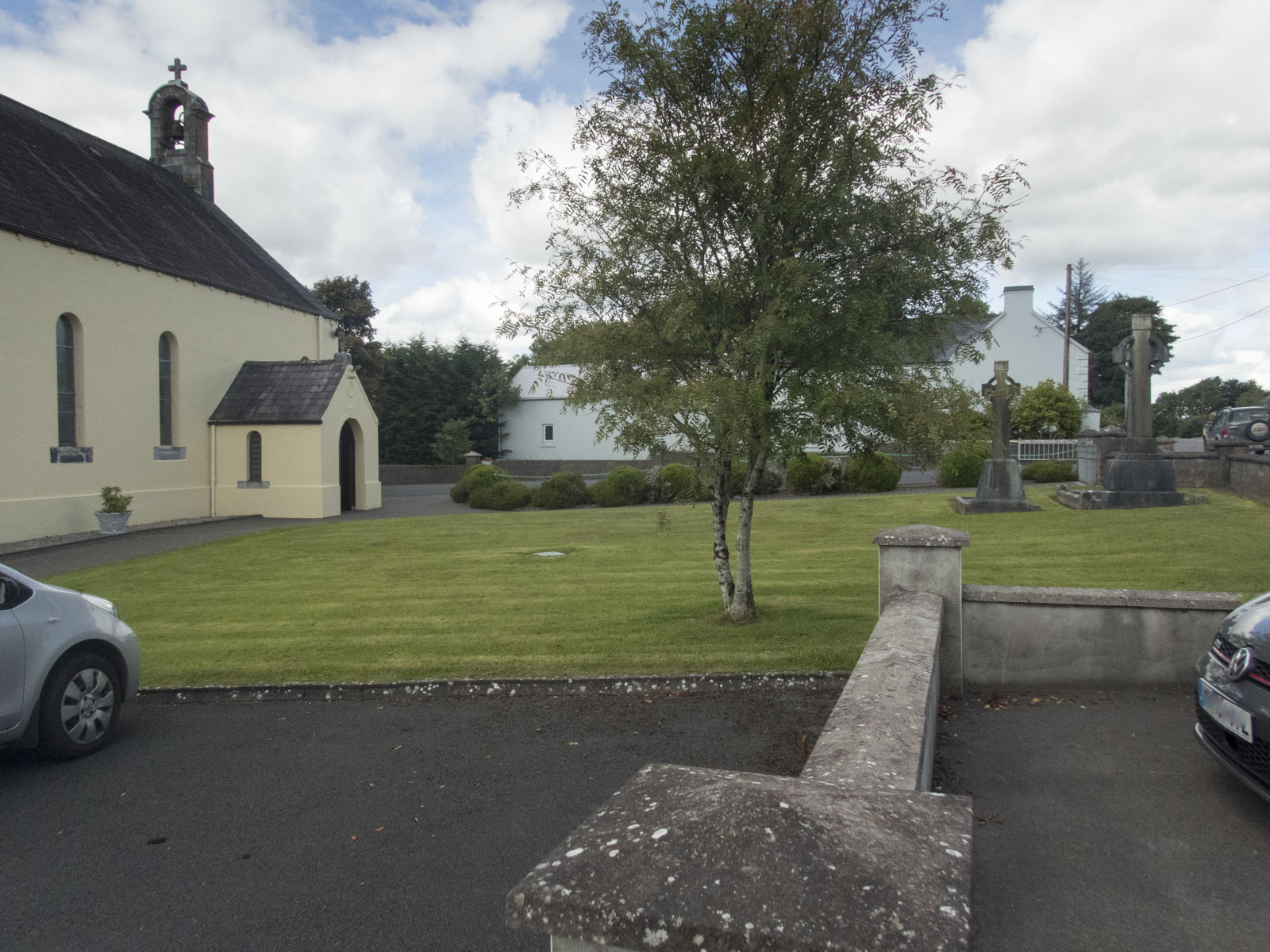
- St. Abina's Catholic church, Clondrohid

- Location in Ireland
- Coordinates: 51°55′45″N 09°01′20″W
- Country: Ireland
- Province: Munster
- County: County Cork

Population (2022)
  - Total: 180
- Time zone: UTC+0 (WET)
  - Summer (DST): UTC-1 (IST (WEST))
- Irish grid reference: W296757

Clondrohid (Irish: Cluain Droichead, meaning 'meadow of the bridge') is a village and civil parish in County Cork, Ireland, four miles (6 km) north of Macroom. As of the 2022 census, the population of the village was recorded as 180, down slightly from 188 people as of the 2011 census.

== Geography ==
Parishes adjoining Clondrohid include Aghabulloge, Ballyvourney, Drishane, Kilcorney, Kilnamartry, and Macroom. The townlands of Clondrohid were once part of the barony of West Muskerry. Today, Clondrohid lies within the Cork North-West Dáil constituency.

== Amenities ==
Local amenities include Clondrohid National School and community hall and a number of shops, pubs and services. A childcare facility is next to the GAA pitch which is also a preschool and an afterschool.

Carrigaphooca Castle. a ruined five story rectangular tower house is located on one of Clondrohid's townlands. A c. 3,000 year old Carrigaphooca stone circle is located in a field nearby the castle.

Much of the western side of the village is a part of the Irish-speaking area or Gaeltacht. Some pupils of the national school go to the second-level school in Ballyvourney to further their education through the Irish language.

== People ==
- Peadar Ó Laoghaire (1839-1920), Irish scholar and priest, was born in the parish of Clondrohid.
