= Macroom Castle =

Castle in Macroom, County Cork, Ireland

Coordinates: 51°54′21″N 8°57′54″W

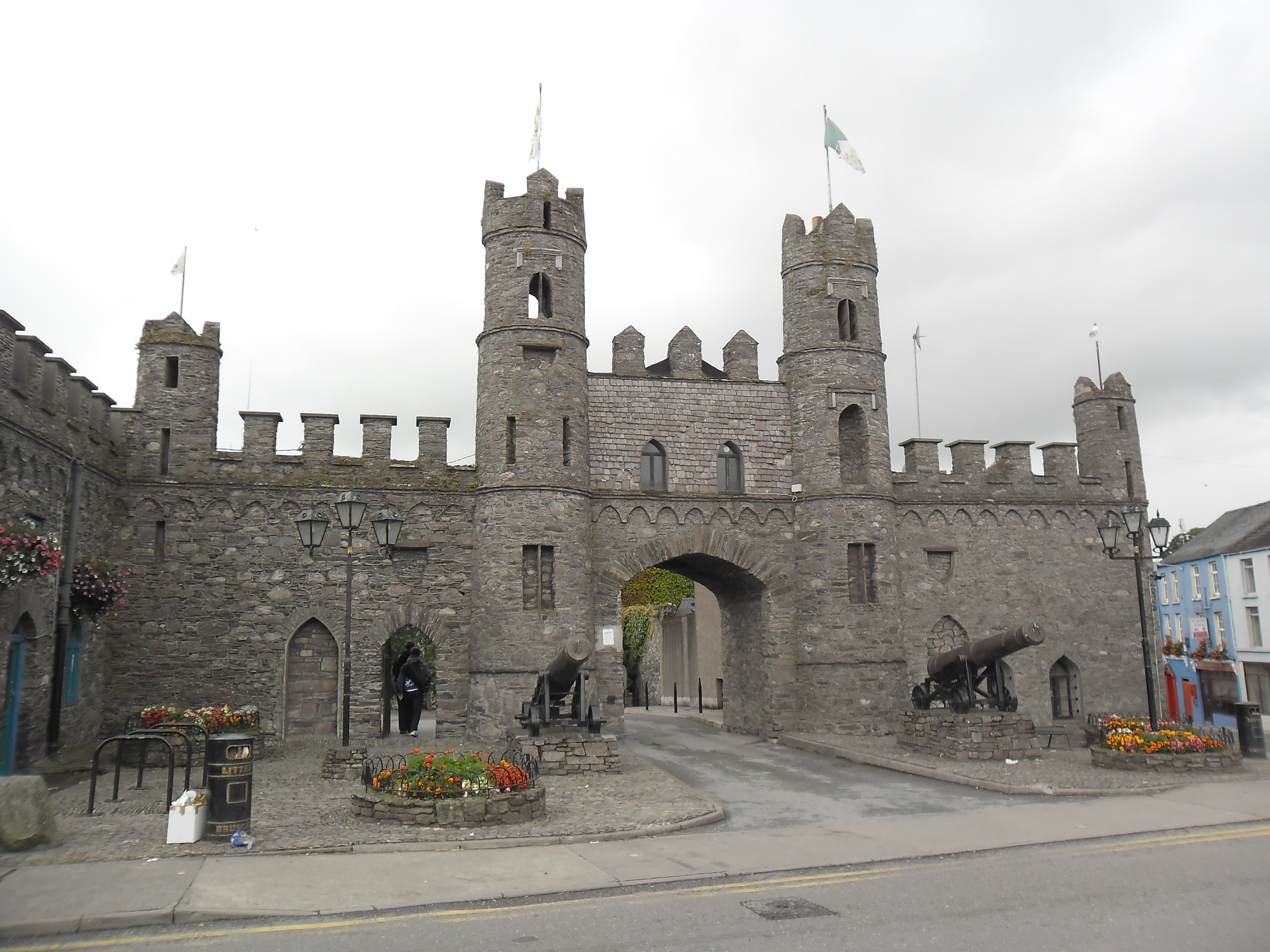
- Macroom Castle Gatehouse

- Location in Ireland

History
- Built: 19th century (mostly)

Listed Building
- Type: National
- Designated: 13/07/2009
- Reference no.: 20852020 (Castle)

Listed Building
- Type: Regional
- Designated: 17/07/2009
- Reference no.: 20852025 (Gatehouse)

Macroom Castle, in the centre of the town of Macroom, was once residence and fortress of the Lords of Muskerry. The castle has changed owners many times, has been besieged, burned, and rebuilt. The MacCarthys of Muskerry owned it with some interruptions from about 1353 when Muskerry was given to Dermot MacCarthy, 1st Lord of Muskerry, until 1691 when Donogh MacCarthy, 4th Earl of Clancarty lost it definitively.

What remains of the castle is a gatehouse on the town square and a ruin near the bridge over the River Sullane. This ruin comprises an old tower, everything else dates from an early 19th-century rebuild by Robert Hedges Eyre.

== Location ==
The town of Macroom is divided by the River Sullane into two parts of similar size. The town square and the castle are in the historic centre on the right, eastern bank. The castle extends between the town square and the river. It now consists of two disjoint pieces: the gatehouse and the castle ruin. Habitations, businesses, and a school, the Bishop McEgan College, occupy most of the former castle grounds. The gatehouse stands on the western side of the square, called the West Square, obliquely facing the Market House. The castle ruin stands further west on the steep right bank of the river just upstream (south) of the bridge. It is separated from Castle Street by a row of houses.

== Architecture ==
=== Gatehouse ===
The gatehouse is a medieval-romantic theatrical folly. Robert Hedges Eyre had it built before 1824. It consists of an arched passage surmounted by a guard chamber and flanked by two round turrets (towers). Stretches of crenulated walls are attached to either side. They end against neighbouring houses. Most of this ensemble is built from grey rubble stone, except the front of the guard chamber which looks like ashlar but is only a facing formed by plates of slate. Two cannons stand on pedestals before the gate.

=== Castle ruin ===
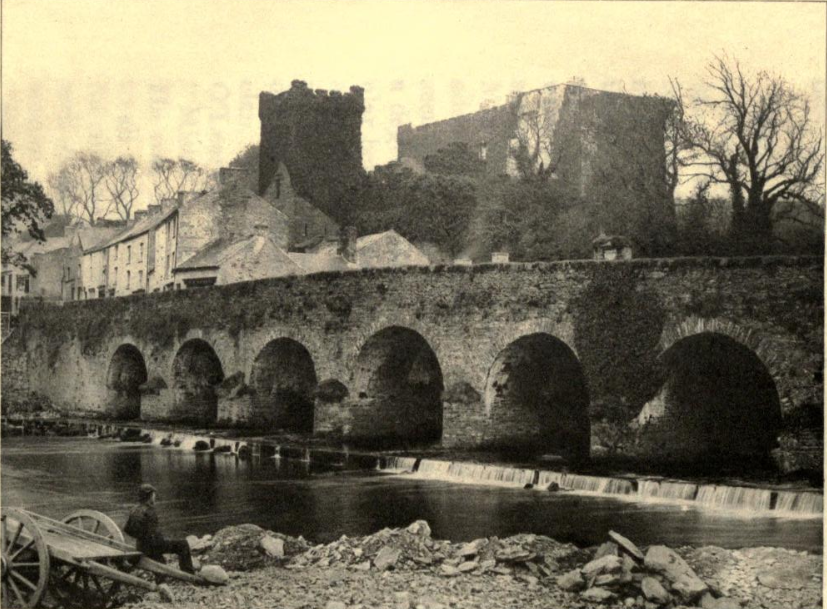
Bridge and castle of Macroom before 1911

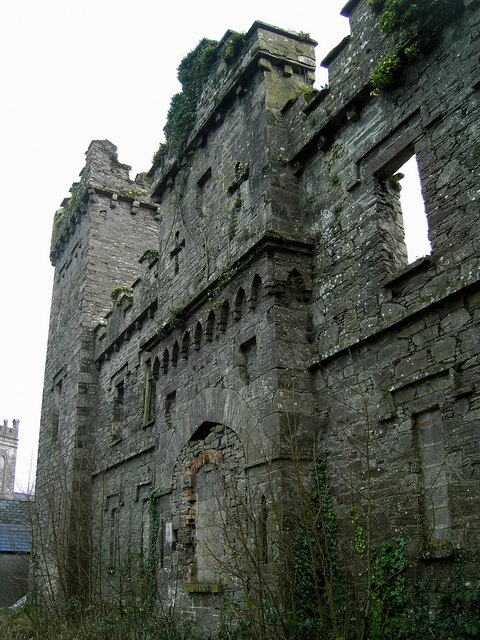
Ruin of the castle's west-wing and tower, seen from the river in 2005

The castle ruin consists of a tower and the remains of the castle's west-wing. The tower is square and has three levels. It is crowned by crenulations. Its core probably dates from an earlier castle of which it formed the north-west corner, but its windows with their square hood moulds and the crenulations date from the 19th century.

The main body of the residence was a three-story, six by three-bay block that formed the castle's south-wing. This building had been fashioned before 1750 by filling the gap between two older square or rectangular towers of similar height and reorganising the resulting house inside and outside. Its front looked out over the once extensive park (demesne) that stretched southward along the river. This house was entirely demolished in 1967 after it had been burned in 1922 and had become derelict and unstable. It once dominated the town's skyline by its height and sheer size as can be seen on old photos. Its place is now occupied by the modern wing of the Bishop McEgan College.

The castle's west-wing once linked the surviving tower to the now missing main residential block. It seems to have been entirely built or rebuilt in the 19th century. It was partially demolished. Only the western facade survives and still looks out over the river. It has five bays. The central bay forms a projecting break-front that has a gate with a pointed arch and a crow-stepped gable. The windows have square hood moulds. Stepped crenulations run along the top (see image).

== History ==
The castle probably originated in King John's time (12th century). The founders might have been the O'Flynns, the Carews, or the Daltons. The castle's old Irish name Caisleán Uí Fhloinn suggests that it once belonged to the O'Flynns, who owned much land in this part of Muskerry before they were superseded by the MacCarthys. In 1353 Muskerry, and Macroom with it, was given as appanage to Dermot MacCarthy, 1st Lord of Muskerry, second son of Cormac MacCarthy Mor, King of Desmond. The MacCarthys of Muskerry owned the castle until the middle of the 17th century. Teige MacCarthy, 11th Lord Muskerry, restored and enlarged the castle and died there in 1565.

During Tyrone's Rebellion after the Spanish had landed in Kinsale and had been driven out of it again, it became known that Cormac MacDermot MacCarthy, 16th Lord of Muskerry had been in secret communication with them. On 18 August 1602 he was arrested. He escaped from prison in Cork City on 29 September. Macroom Castle was besieged by government troops first under Captain Flower then under Charles Wilmot who captured it in 1601 or 1602 taking advantage of an accidental fire in the castle.

In 1645, during the Irish Confederate Wars, the Papal Nuncio Giovanni Battista Rinuccini visited Macroom Castle where Lady Muskerry and her 11-year-old eldest son, Charles, received him while her husband Donough MacCarty, the 2nd Viscount Muskerry, was negotiating with Ormond, the Lord Lieutenant, in Dublin.

In 1650, during the Cromwellian conquest of Ireland, Boetius MacEgan, Bishop of Ross, assembled a Confederate army at the castle, but when the Cromwellian troops of Lord Broghill approached, the castle garrison set fire to the building before joining the bishop's army in the castle park. During the ensuing battle, the bishop and Roche, the High Sheriff of Kerry, were taken prisoners. The sheriff was shot, but the bishop was offered his freedom if he could persuade the garrison of Carrigadrohid Castle to surrender. However, on arrival at Carrigadrohid he chose instead to exhort the garrison to hold on and was hanged from a nearby tree. Later in the war General Ireton sent a troop to Macroom that burned the town and the castle. in 1656, during the Commonwealth, the castle was given to Admiral William Penn, the father of the founder of Pennsylvania. He moved into the castle in 1656. At the restoration of the monarchy it was restored to Donough MacCarty, now the 1st Earl of Clancarty, who further enlarged and renovated it.

During the Williamite war in Ireland Donough MacCarty, 4th Earl of Clancarty, turned Jacobite and let on 11 September 1689 Macroom Castle be used as a prison for Protestants evicted from Cork. In 1691 the castle was occupied by the Williamites but then besieged by the Jacobites until Major Percy Kirke came and relieved it.

The castle was confiscated in 1691 and sold by auction in 1703. It was acquired by the speculatory Hollow Sword Blade Company, who resold it to Francis Bernard, later the 1st Earl of Bandon. In 1824 Macroom was owned jointly by Bandon and Robert Hedges Eyre. The Gatehouse and the Market House were both built in the early 19th century (before 1824) as part of a plan to embellish the town centre and the marketplace. In 1840 Eyre died unmarried. His inheritance was broken up in parts. William Hedges-White, at that time only younger brother of the Earl of Bantry, inherited Macroom. He still owned it in 1861. He succeeded his brother as the 3rd Earl of Bantry in 1668. When the 3rd Earl's daughter Olivia, who had been born in Macroom Castle in 1850, married Lord Ardilaun in 1871, the castle passed with her to the Ardilauns.

During the Irish War of Independence the castle was used by British Auxiliaries who became the target of the Kilmichael ambush. During the Irish Civil War anti-treaty forces burned the castle on 18 August 1922, one of the many affected by the destruction of Irish country houses. In 1924 Olivia, a descendant of the MacCarthy chiefs, and widow of Lord Ardilaun, sold the castle demesne to a group of local businessmen, to be held in trust for the people of the town.

== Sources ==
- Adams, Constance Louisa (1904). Castles of Ireland – Some Fortress Histories and Legends. London: Elliot Stock. OCLC 751487142.
- Bagwell, Richard (1909). Ireland under the Stuarts and under the Interregnum. Vol. II. London: Longmans, Green, and Co. OCLC 458582656. – 1642 to 1660
- Burke, Sir Bernard (1879). A Genealogical and Heraldic History of the Landed Gentry of Great Britain and Ireland. Vol. I (6th ed.). London: Harrison. OCLC 972909415. – A to KYR (for Eyre)
- Clavin, Terry (October 2009). "MacCarthy, Sir Cormac mac Dermond". Dictionary of Irish Biography.
- Cokayne, George Edward (1910). Gibbs, Vicary (ed.). The complete peerage of England, Scotland, Ireland, Great Britain and the United Kingdom, extant, extinct, or dormant. Vol. I (2nd ed.). London: St Catherine Press. OCLC 228661424. – Ab-Adam to Basing (for Ardilaun & Bantry)
- Dooley, Terence (2022). Burning the Big House. Yale University Press. ISBN 978-0-300-26511-8.
- Geoghegan, Patrick M. (October 2009). "Eyres, Robert Hedges". In McGuire, James; Quinn, James (eds.). Dictionary of Irish Biography (online ed.).
- Gibson, Charles Bernard (1861). The History of the County and City of Cork. Vol. II. London: Thomas C. Newby. OCLC 1046522071. – 1603 to 1860
- Hall, S. C.; Mrs S. C. Hall (1911). Ireland: Its Scenery, Character, and History. Vol. I. Boston: Francis A Niccolls & Company. OCLC 3567745. – Cork and Carlow
- Lewis, Samuel (1840). A Topographical Dictionary of Ireland. Vol. II (2nd ed.). London: S. Lewis & Co. OCLC 1040258496. – G to Z
- MacGeoghegan, James (1763). Histoire de l'Irlande ancienne et modern, tirée des Monuments les plus authentiques [History of Ancient and Modern Ireland] (in French). Vol. Tome troisième. Paris: Antoine Boudet. – 1558 to 1699
- Mangianiello, Stephen C. (2004). The Concise Encyclopedia of the Revolutions and Wars of England, Scotland, and Ireland 1639–1660. Lanham MD: Scarecrow Press. ISBN 0-8108-5100-8.
- Ohlmeyer, Jane H. (2004). "MacCarthy, Donough, first earl of Clancarty (1594–1665)". In Matthew, Colin; Harrison, Brian (eds.). Oxford Dictionary of National Biography. Vol. 35. New York: Oxford University Press. pp. 107–108. ISBN 0-19-861385-7.
- Pigot (1824). Provincial Directory of Ireland: Munster (PDF).
- Pollard, Albert Frederick (1900). "Wilmot, Sir Charles, first Viscount of Athlone (d. 1633)". In Lee, Sidney (ed.). Dictionary of National Biography. Vol. LXII Williamson–Worden. New York: The Macmillan Company. pp. 59–61. OCLC 8544105.
- Smith, Charles (1893a) [1st pub. 1750]. The Ancient and Present State of the County and City of Cork. Vol. I. Cork: Guy and Co. OCLC 559463963. – Topography
- Smith, Charles (1893b) [1st pub. 1750]. The Ancient and Present State of the County and City of Cork. Vol. II. Cork: Guy and Co. OCLC 559463963. – History
- Webb, Alfred (1878). "MacCarty, Sir Cormac". Compendium of Irish Biography. Dublin: M. H. Gill & Son. p. 303, left column. OCLC 122693688.
- Windele, John (1839). Historical and Descriptive Notices of the City of Cork and its Vicinity. Cork: Luke H. Bolster. OCLC 20432940.
- "Macroom Castle". National Inventory of Architectural Heritage.
- "Macroom Gatehouse". National Inventory of Architectural Heritage.
- "Macroom Markethouse". National Inventory of Architectural Heritage.
