= Boggeragh Mountains =

Mountain range in Ireland

- Irish: An Bhograch
- Location within Ireland

Highest point
- Peak: Musheramore
- Elevation: 644 m (2,113 ft)
- Coordinates: 52°01′N 8°55′W

Geography
- Country: Ireland
- Provinces of Ireland: Munster

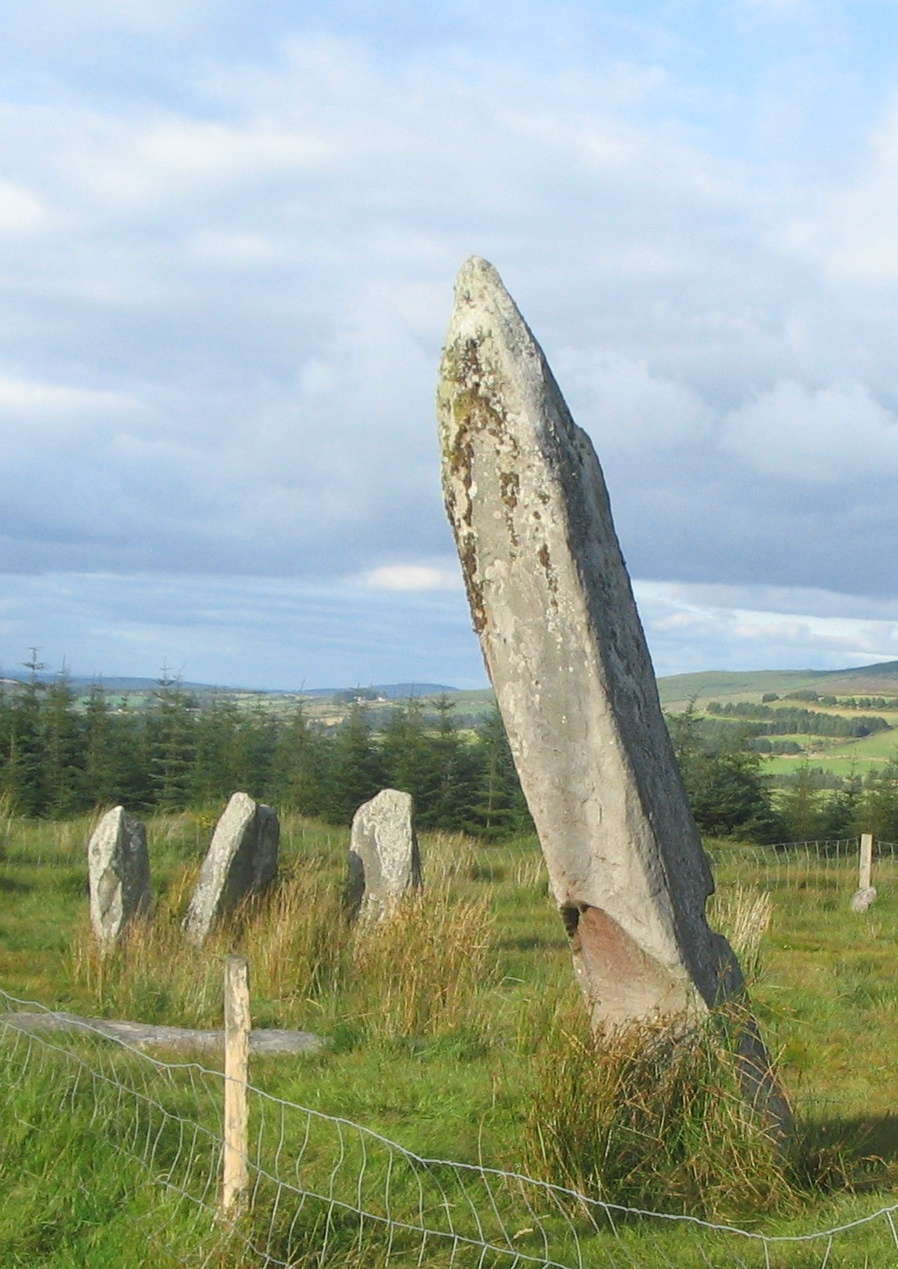
Knocknakilla standing stone on the Boggeragh Mountains

The Boggeragh Mountains (Irish: An Bhograch) are located in County Cork, Ireland, with the Munster Blackwater to the north and the River Lee to the south of the hills. With an elevation of 644 m (2,113 ft), the highest peak is Musheramore (Irish: Muisire Mór). The landscape consists of peat blanket bog, grassland, streams and areas of forestry. The mountains were formed from Old Red Sandstone deposited during the Devonian Period. They were shaped by glacial erosion during the last glacial period.

Construction of a wind farm in the area started in September 2009. In February 2010 19 units of Vestas V90-3MW MW wind turbines are up and running.
