= Kilnamartyra =

Village in County Cork, Ireland

Kilnamartyra Cill na Martra Kilnamartery Kilnamartra
- Village
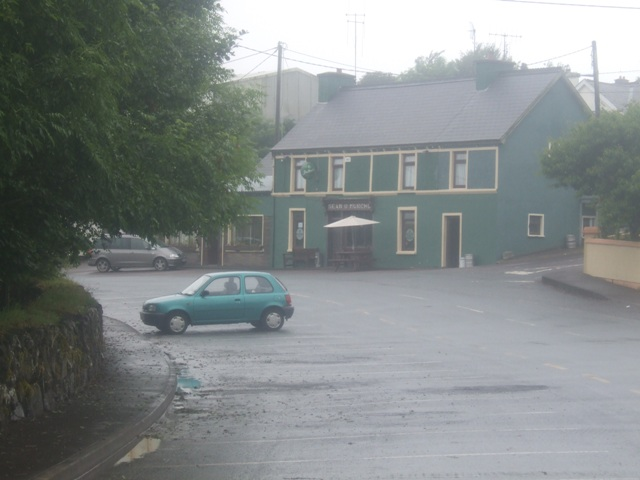
- Main street and pub (Ó Murchú's) in Cill na Martra, 2009

- Location in Ireland
- Coordinates: 51°54′01″N 9°04′57″W
- Country: Ireland
- Province: Munster
- County: County Cork
- Irish Grid Reference: W253726
- Official name: Cill na Martra

Kilnamartyra (Irish: Cill na Martra [ˌciːl̠ʲ n̪ˠə ˈmˠaɾˠt̪ˠəɾˠə], meaning church of the martyr or church of the relic), also Kilnamartery, is a village and civil parish in County Cork, Ireland. It is located around half-way between Killarney and Cork, close to Macroom. The parish is a kilometre from the L3402 local road which joins the N22 road, three kilometres away.

Historically its townlands were part of the barony of Muskerry West. The local national school is called Scoil Lachtain Naofa. It is a gaelscoil and is named after Saint Lachtain, the patron saint of Cill na Martra. Other amenities in the village include a GAA pitch and two pubs.

== History ==
The Irish St Lachtin is believed to have found a monastery in the area in the 8th century, and the village name of Church of the relic likely refers to him, while the Shrine of Saint Lachtin's Arm, now in the National Museum of Ireland, may have originate from the area and once have contained portions of his arm bones.

== Industry ==
Kilnamartyra has been home to the Prince August Toy Soldier factory since 1976. Founded by the Swedish couple Lars and Gunilla Edman, they manufacture and sell a range of military and fantasy figurines and home-making kits, and have established a local visitor center. At one point, the company employed almost 40 people.

== Cultural references ==
The song Kilnamartyra Exile was written by Johnny Brown of Kilnamartyra. Brown, who had served in the First World War, subsequently joined the St. John of God Brothers and was a missionary in Africa.

== See also ==
- Cill Na Martra GFC

== Sources ==
- Synnott, Chris. "Artefacts from Blarney in the National Museum". Blarney and District Historical Society. Retrieved 1 August 2021
