= Musheramore =

- Muisire Mór
- Location within Ireland

Highest point
- Elevation: 643 m (2,110 ft)
- Prominence: 439 m (1,440 ft)
- Listing: Hewitt, Marilyn
- Coordinates: 52°00′50″N 8°58′42″W

Naming
- English translation: great [mountain] of the Múscraige
- Language of name: Irish

Geography
- Location: County Cork, Ireland
- Parent range: Boggeragh Mountains
- OSI/OSNI grid: W328850

Musheramore (Irish: Muisire Mór, 'big Mushera') is a mountain with a height of 643 metres (2,110 ft) in County Cork, Ireland. It is the highest of the Boggeragh Mountains. The neighbouring hill is Musherabeg (Muisire Beag, 'little Mushera'), with a height of 499 metres (1,637 ft). Historically the mountain was called Knock Muskery, from Cnoc Múscraighe meaning "hill of the Múscraige", a Gaelic tribe who gave their name to the barony of Muskerry. There are two holy wells on the mountain: one near the summit for sick animals, and one on its northern slopes for humans (St John's Well), where mass was traditionally held on midsummer.

== See also ==
- List of mountains in Ireland
