= Olivia Charlotte Guinness, Baroness Ardilaun =

Irish philanthropist (1850–1925)

The Right Honourable The Lady Ardilaun
- Born: 27 August 1850; Macroom Castle, County Cork, Ireland
- Died: 13 December 1925 (aged 75); Dublin, Irish Free State
- Spouse: Arthur Guinness, Baron Ardilaun (m. 1871; died 1915)
- Parent(s): William Hedges-White, 3rd Earl of Bantry; Jane Herbert

Olivia Charlotte Guinness, Baroness Ardilaun (27 August 1850 – 13 December 1925), best known as Lady Ardilaun was, after the British monarch, the richest woman of her time in Britain and Ireland. A daughter of the Earl of Bantry, she was connected to Muckross House, Macroom Castle, Bantry House, the St Anne's Estate in Dublin, and Ashford Castle.

== Life ==
Born Olivia Charlotte Hedges-White to Jane Herbert and her husband, William Hedges-White, 3rd Earl of Bantry, on 27 August 1850 in County Cork, she was one of six children. Her brother became the last Earl of Bantry. Her family had lived at Muckross House, County Kerry since the 1650s.

She married Sir Arthur Guinness on 16 February 1871 at Bantry, County Cork, Ireland. They had no children.

Ardilaun enjoyed painting, collecting her watercolours in a bound album, and was a member of the Water Colour Society of Ireland. The works include the landscape around Ashford Castle, the family's main home, and views from the family house in suburban Dublin. The couple completely rebuilt the Dublin house, renaming it from Thornhill to St Anne's, as well as arranging a grand addition to Ashford Castle. By the time they were finished it was considered a grand mansion, and hosted George, Duke of York, later King George V, and Queen Victoria. Ardilaun was known for her gardens and named several roses, as well as having flowers named after her.

The Ardilauns were known for the lavish parties and great hospitality they showed, as well as their philanthropic nature. Lady Ardilaun worked with Mercer's Hospital as their benefactor and regularly visiting the patients. She also became a patron of the arts and was greatly admired by Lady Gregory.

Ardilaun supported the Irish soldiers of the First World War, providing care packages and letters. She kept all the correspondence, providing a great resource to later historians. However, after the death of her husband and the upheaval of the Irish War of Independence and the Irish Civil War, Lady Ardilaun retired to St Anne's. Increasingly cut off and isolated by her status and history, she allowed the house to fall into disrepair and in her final years she moved into the Shelbourne Hotel in Dublin, where she died aged 75.

== Legacy ==
She had inherited her birthplace Macroom Castle, and completely restored it and parts of the town, as it had once belonged to her direct ancestor Donough MacCarty, 1st Earl of Clancarty, a leader of Confederate Ireland in the 1640s. After the death of her husband in 1915 she lived there more often. It was nearly destroyed in 1920 along with the town of Macroom when the order was given by Major-General Sir Henry Tudor. Ardilaun was a friend and pleaded with him to spare the town, and he deferred to her.

However it was occupied and later destroyed in 1922 by Anti-Treaty forces during the Irish Civil War. She obtained modest compensation from the new Irish Free State, and later sold the castle to a trust for the people of the town. She commented that "I am pleased to think that at all events the old inhabitants and the best elements in the town grieve with me for this great loss".

Her demesne land at Macroom was sold to Macroom's new golf club for £1,500 in 1925. St Anne's house eventually burned down in 1943, having fallen even further into disrepair, and the grounds are now Dublin's second biggest municipal park. The organ in All Saints' Church, Raheny, where she is buried, was donated by Lady Ardilaun along with several stained glass windows.

Lady Ardilaun's architect cousin Katherine Everett recalled visiting the ruins of Macroom Castle in August 1922, soon after the fire, and recorded Olivia's deep sense of loss: "When people have been born and have grown up in a house on their own land, where their forebears have lived and died for generations, they may feel not only love for it, but a bond which ties them to every stone and tree and sod of the place".

== In popular culture ==
Lady Ardilaun is portrayed by Danielle Galligan in the Netflix television series House of Guinness.
