= Knocknakilla =

Megalithic complex in Cork, Ireland

Coordinates: 52.00680°N 9.02448°W

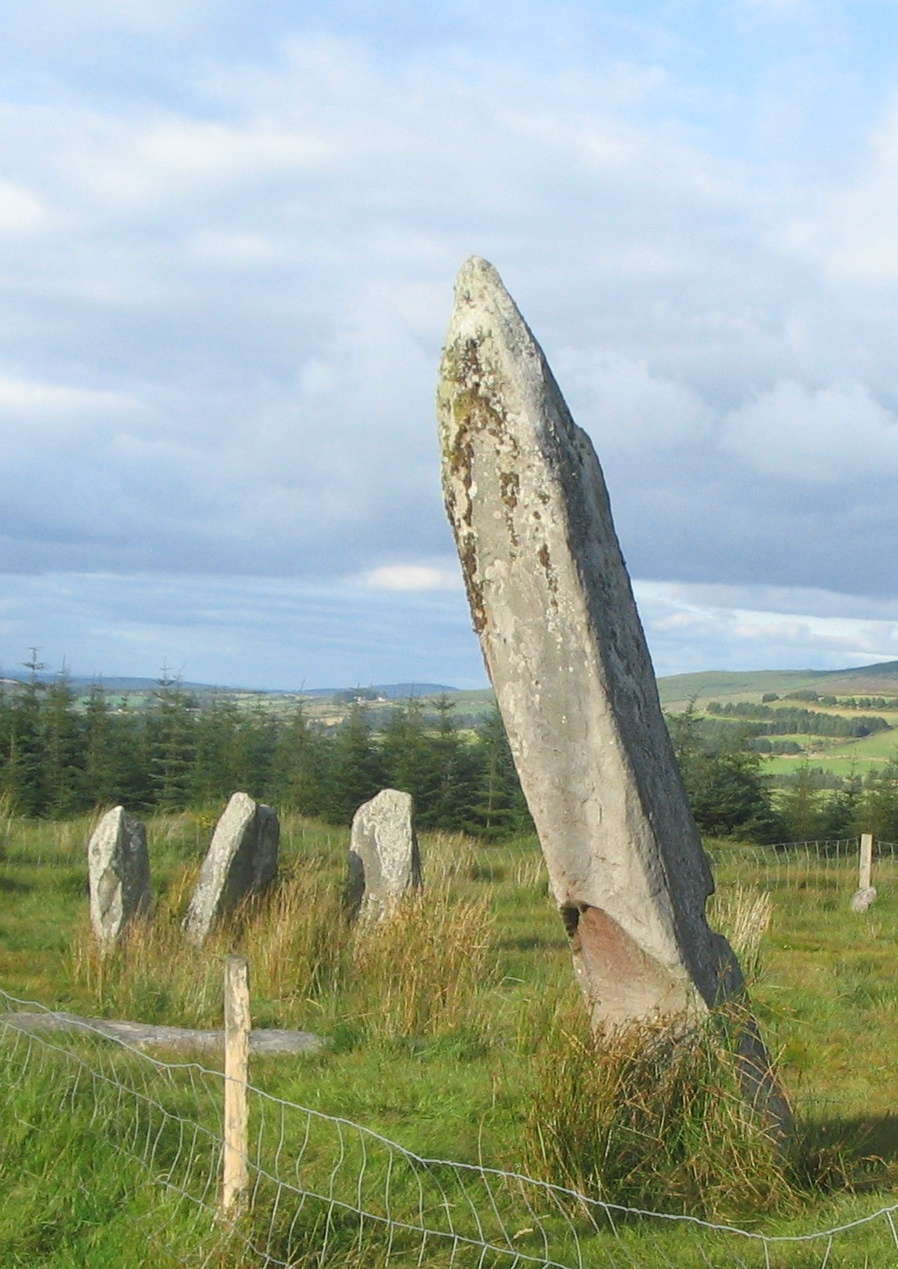
- View of the Standing Stone at the main Complex
- Interactive map of Knocknakilla

National monument of Ireland
- Official name: Knocknakilla
- Reference no.: 420

Knocknakilla is the site of a megalithic complex (grid reference W297843) situated between Macroom and Millstreet, in County Cork, Ireland. It is set in blanket peatland on the north-west upper slopes of Musherabeg mountain and is thought to be 3500 years old.

== Environment ==
The mid-Cork area is rich in archaeological artifacts, and the surrounding townlands contain two cashels, a ringfort, two fulacht fiadh, a possible souterrain and a circular enclosure. The word Knocknakilla is derived from the Irish Cnoc na Cille, as 'The Hill of the Church'.

== Description ==
The site is located is on a level patch of bogland overlooking a deep valley and comprises a recumbent stone circle, a radial cairn and two pointed portal stones (one of which has fallen), aligned north-northeast to south-southwest. The stone circle is made up of five 1.3- to 1.5-metre-high stones, of which two (the axis and east sidestone) fell sometime in the last 50 years.

Three meters away is a 10-stone, 3.5-metre-diameter, radial cairn which was first discovered by Coillte Teoranta in 1970. The upright standing stone is 3.7 metres tall, and it leans heavily to the north.

Knocknakilla is best known for its large phallic, now leaning, portal stone. Given the stones' relation to both the rising and setting sun, it is thought that they were aligned with purpose and functionality in mind, likely as calendars to early farmers, probably related to harvest or fertility ceremonies.

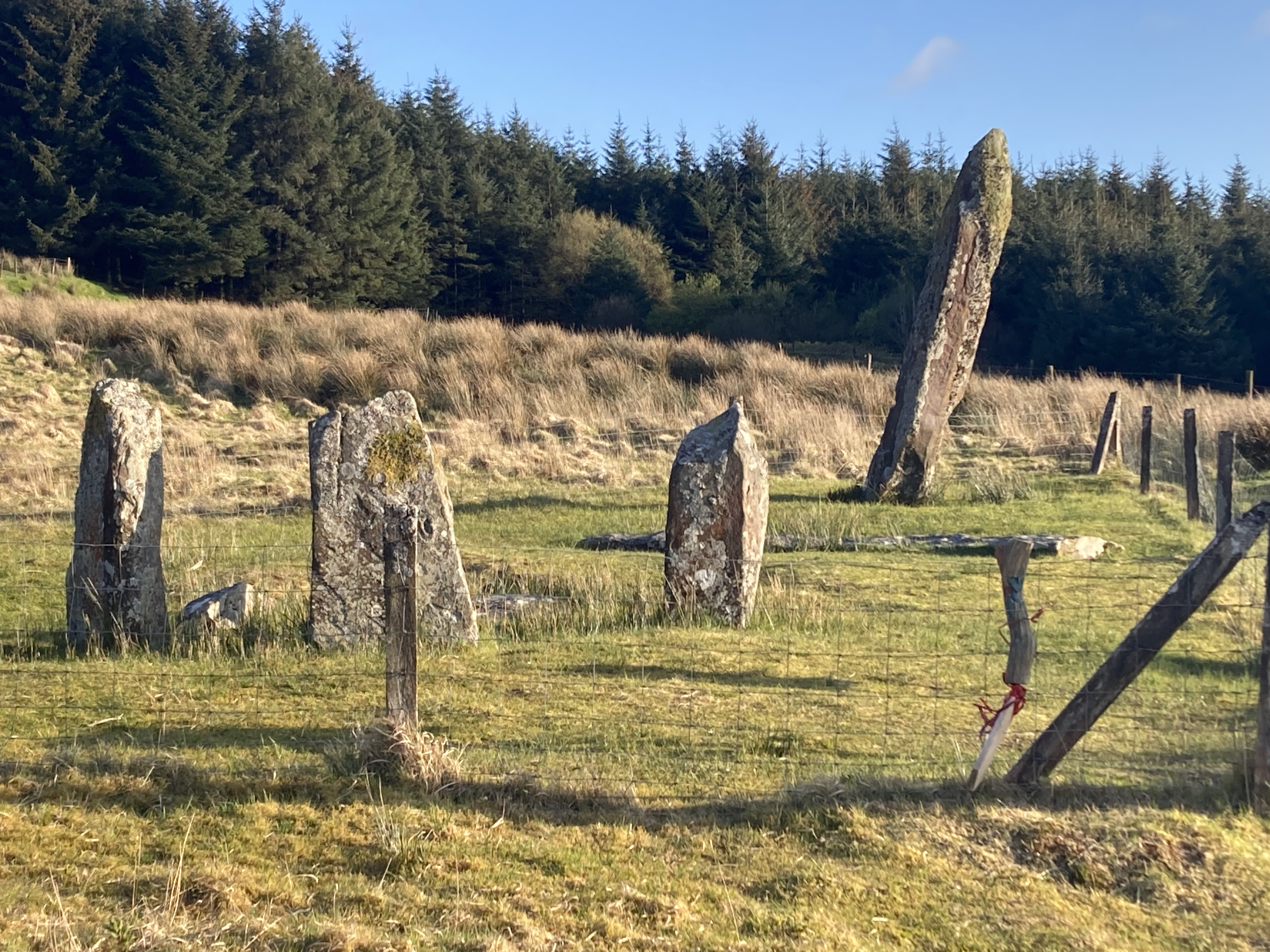
View of the larger stones at the comples

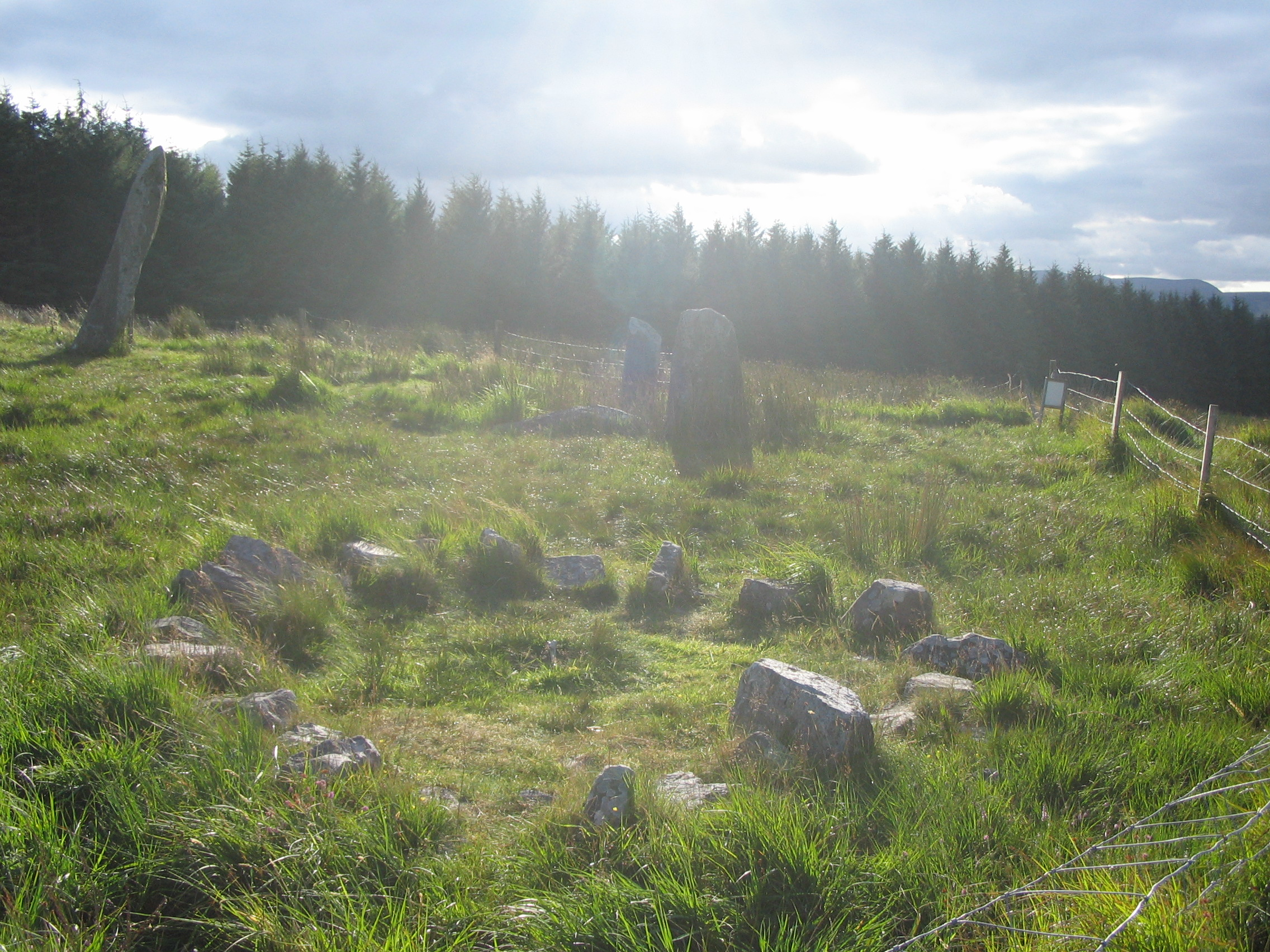
The stone circle

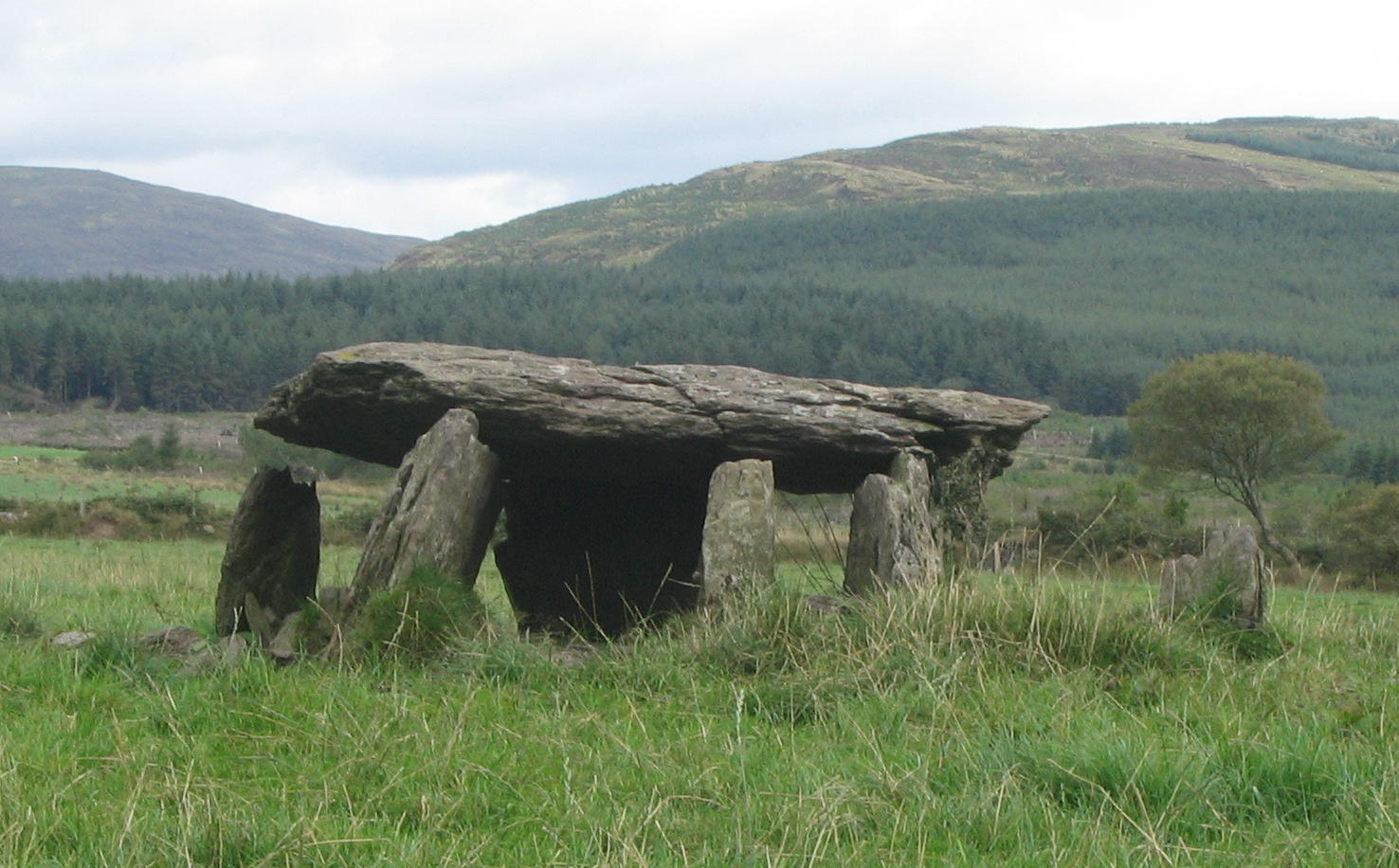
The nearby Wedge tomb at Glantane

== Sources ==
- Power, Denis. Archaeological inventory of County Cork, Volume 3: Mid Cork, 9467 ColorBooks, 1997. ISBN 0-7076-4933-1
