= River Sullane =

River primarily in County Cork, Ireland, tributary of the Lee

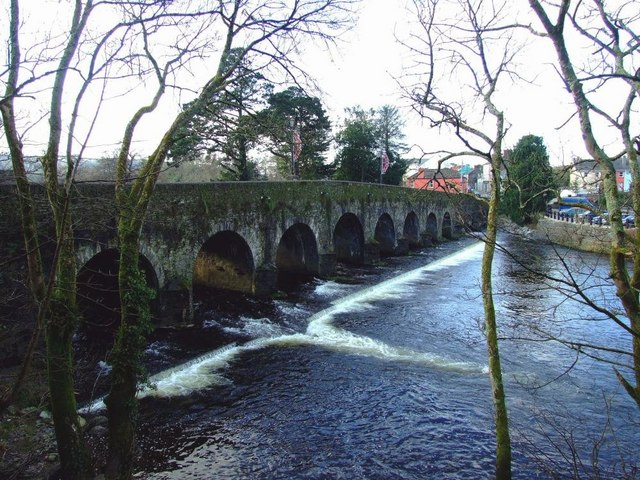
Bridge over the Sullane at Macroom

The River Sullane (Irish: An Sulán) runs from the mountains between County Cork and County Kerry in southern Ireland, near the village of Cúil Aodha. After passing Ballyvourney, it runs through the centre of Macroom, to which it provides drinking water (and occasionally floods). The Sullane is joined by the River Bohill at Ballyvourney, the River Foherish at Clondrohid, about 5 kilometres west of Macroom and the River Launa locally known as "The Launey" one kilometre east of the town. The Sullane joins the River Lee a further kilometre east.

It is known as the only masculine river in Ireland due to Gaeilge using pronouns and typically rivers taking the feminine. The Sullane is an exception but there is never any reason given for why. It also has a curse, it is said to want a sacrifice of a person once every 7 years according to local myths. There is a poem about the Sullane referencing both the rivers masculinity and curse. It is "An Sulán" le Seán Ó Céilleachair.

The river is well stocked with trout, and also contains European perch (200 g average), minnow and a small number of pike. In 2024, effluent released from the Macroom Wastewater Treatment Plant polluted the Sullane; Uisce Éireann and Glanua Ireland (a company managing the plant) were later fined for the release.
