= Justin McCarthy, Viscount Mountcashel =

Irish Jacobite (c. 1643 –1694)

The 1st Viscount Mountcashel
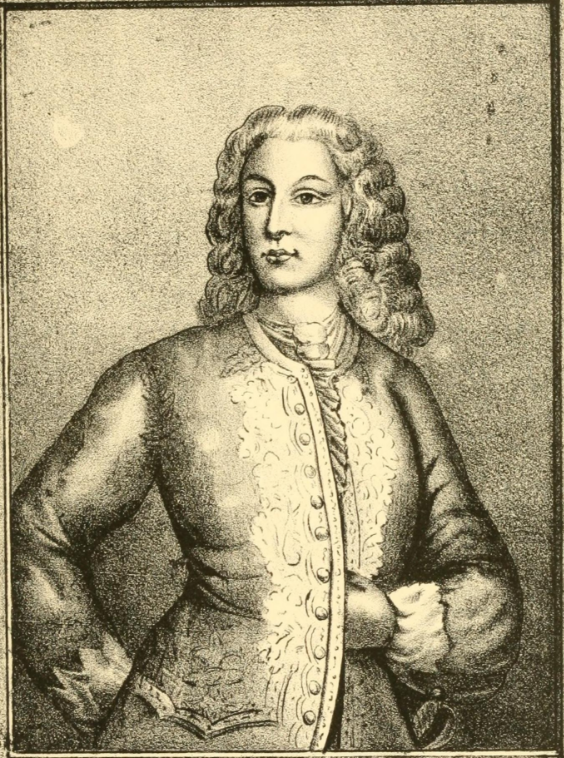
- Tenure: 1689–1694
- Born: c. 1643
- Died: 1 July 1694; Barèges, France
- Spouse: Arabella Wentworth
- Father: Donough, 1st Earl of Clancarty
- Mother: Eleanor Butler

Justin McCarthy, 1st Viscount Mountcashel, PC (Ire) (c. 1643 – 1694), was a Jacobite general in the Williamite War in Ireland and a personal friend of James II. He commanded Irish Army troops during the conflict, enjoying initial success when he seized Bandon in County Cork in 1689. However, he was defeated and captured at the Battle of Newtownbutler later in the same year. He escaped and was accused of having broken parole. After the end of the war, he led an Irish Brigade overseas for service in the French Army. He died in French exile.

== Birth and origins ==
Justin was born about 1643, probably in Blarney, County Cork, Ireland. He was the third son of Donough, 2nd Viscount Muskerry, and his wife Eleanor Butler. At the time of his birth, Justin's father was the 2nd Viscount Muskerry, but he would be advanced to being Earl of Clancarty in 1658. His father's family were the MacCartys of Muskerry, a Gaelic Irish dynasty that branched from the MacCarthy-Mor line with Dermot MacCarthy, second son of Cormac MacCarthy-Mor, a medieval Prince of Desmond. This second son had been granted the Muskerry area as appanage.

Justin's mother was the eldest sister of the 1st Marquess of Ormond, who was later created the 1st Duke of Ormond. Her family, the Butlers, were Old English and descended from Theobald Walter, who had been appointed Chief Butler of Ireland by King Henry II in 1177. Justin's parents were both Catholic; they had married before 1641.

Family tree

Justin McCarthy with wife, parents, and other selected relatives. His marriage was childless. (Note: This family tree is based on a tree focused on Callaghan, his father and his brothers and on genealogies of the Earls of Clancarty, the MacCarthy of Muskerry family, and the Earls of Ormond. Also see the lists of siblings in the text.)

Charles; 1st Viscount; Muskerry; 1564–1641	Margaret; O'Brien	Thomas; Viscount; Thurles d. 1619 d.v.p.*	Elizabeth; Pointz
Donough; 1st Earl; 1594–1665	Eleanor; Butler d. 1682	James; 1st Duke; Ormond; 1610–1688
Helen d. 1722	Charles; Viscount; Muskerry** c. 1633 – 1665 d.v.p.*	Margaret; Bourke	Justin; Viscount; Mountcashel c. 1643 – 1694	Arabella; Wentworth; 1630–1689
Margaret d. 1703	Callaghan; 3rd Earl d. 1676	Elizabeth; FitzGerald d. 1698
Charles; 2nd Earl; 1663–1666	Donough; 4th Earl; 1668–1734	Elizabeth; Spencer; 1671–1704
Robert; MacCarty; 1698–1769

Legend

XXX	Subject of the article	XXX	Earls of Clancarty	XXX	Earls & dukes of Ormond

*d.v.p. = predeceased his father (decessit vita patris)
**courtesy title

Justin listed among his brothers
He appears at the bottom of the list of brothers as the youngest:
1. Charles, also known as Cormac (1633 or 1634 – 1665), predeceased his father being killed in the Battle of Lowestoft, a naval engagement
2. Callaghan (c. 1638 – 1676), succeeded his brother's son as the 3rd Earl of Clancarty
3. Justin (c. 1643 – 1694)

Justin's sisters
1. Helen (died 1722), married 1st John FitzGerald of Dromana and 2ndly the 7th Earl of Clanricarde
2. Margaret (died 1704), became Countess of Fingall by marrying Luke Plunket, 3rd Earl of Fingall

== Irish wars ==
Justin was born during the Irish Confederate Wars in the part of Ireland that was then held by the Irish confederacy. His father was then a member of the confederacy's Supreme Council and commander of its Munster army. Justin was two in 1645 when his mother hosted Giovanni Battista Rinuccini, sent as nuncio to Ireland by Pope Innocent X, at Macroom Castle. His father opposed Rinuccini's dealings in Irish politics and when the nuncio seized power in a coup d'état in 1646, Justin's father was detained at Kilkenny Castle and stripped of the command of the Munster Army.

== Exile ==
In April 1650 his family lost Macroom Castle, where Justin had spent his childhood, in the context of the Battle of Macroom. Around that time, anticipating the loss of Macroom or because of it, his father sent Justin, his mother, and sisters to security in France. His mother then lived in Paris, in the convent of the Feuillantines.

After Rinuccini's departure, his father fought the Parliamentarians in the Cromwellian Conquest of Ireland. Muskerry fought to the bitter end, surrendering Ross Castle near Killarney to Edmund Ludlow in June 1652.

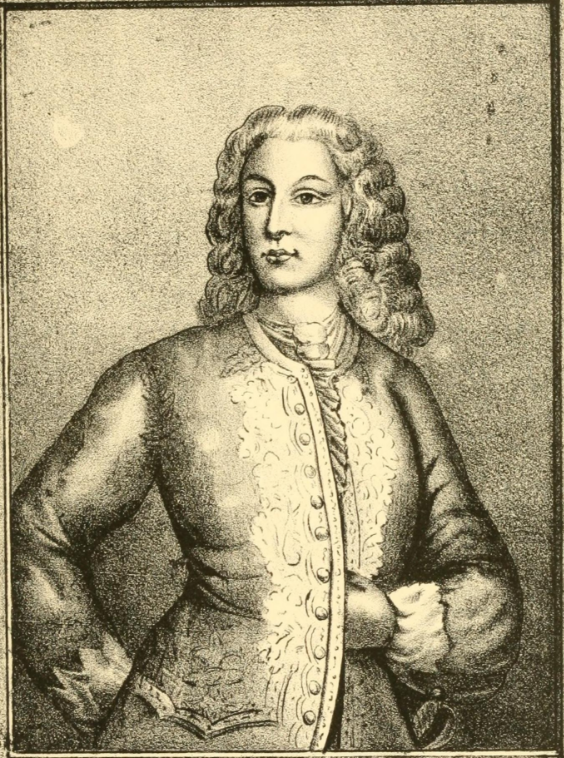
Justin McCarthy as a young man

In 1658 his father was created Earl of Clancarty by Charles II in Brussels, where he was then in exile. By this advancement the title of the viscount of Muskerry became a subsidiary title of the family, which was given as courtesy title to the Earl's heir apparent, at that time his eldest brother Charles, who was therefore styled Viscount Muskerry thereafter.

== Restoration ==
The family had their property confiscated under the Cromwellian regime, but it was restored to them at the Restoration of Charles II. Justin seems to have grown up mainly in France. He became a professional soldier and showed great skill in his profession, but poor eyesight hampered his career. He entered the French army in 1671, and then transferred to the Duke of Monmouth's regiment, then in French pay, and served against the Dutch.

On 4 March 1665, the Second Anglo-Dutch War broke out. Three months into the war, on 3 June 1665 O.S., his brother Charles, Lord Muskerry, was killed on the flagship, the Royal Charles, in the Battle of Lowestoft, the first major naval engagement of the war and an English victory. His brother had an infant son, also named Charles, who succeeded him as heir apparent and was, therefore, styled Viscount of Muskerry. However, their father, the 1st Earl, died two months later, on 4 August 1665, and the younger Charles succeeded as the 2nd Earl of Clancarty. The 2nd Earl died about a year later, on 22 September 1666, still an infant. (Note: (Cokayne 1913) states he died on 22 September 1666, whereas (Burke1866) states that he died in 1668.) Thereupon Callaghan, the infant's uncle, succeeded as the 3rd Earl of Clancarty.

Justin McCarthy came to England in 1678 and was befriended by the future James II, who generally chose soldiers, especially Irish soldiers, as his boon companions. Charles II decided to use his services in Ireland, and made him a colonel in Sir Thomas Dongan's regiment. On the outbreak of the Popish Plot, however, the discovery of Colonel McCarthy's presence at Whitehall caused uproar: he fled the country, and the Secretary of State, Sir Joseph Williamson, who had issued his commission, was sent to the Tower of London.

== Meddling in nephew's marriage ==
By 1683 Colonel MacCarthy was at Court again, where his growing influence was shown by the marriage he arranged for his immensely wealthy nephew Donough MacCarthy, 4th Earl of Clancarty. Callaghan, the 3rd Earl, had died in 1676, leaving his young son in the care of his widow, Lady Elizabeth FitzGerald, daughter of George FitzGerald, 16th Earl of Kildare: she has been described as "a fierce Protestant isolated in a Catholic family". She placed her son in the care of John Fell, Bishop of Oxford, for a Protestant education. Colonel MacCarthy was determined to have the final word on the young earl's marriage and religion, and persuaded the King to invite the young earl to Court for Christmas. He brought that letter in person to the bishop. Here Donough MacCarthy, at sixteen, was married to Elizabeth Spencer who was two years younger. The marriage would not be consummated for many years. The bride was a daughter of Robert Spencer, 2nd Earl of Sunderland. The Earl of Sunderland was a Protestant at that time but had Catholic leanings and would turn a Catholic in 1687. The marriage was a failure, and Kenyon, Sunderland's biographer, remarked that it left a stain on the reputation of all those who ruined the lives of these two young people, without gaining anything in return. Gilbert Burnet wrote that in anything that did not directly concern his religion, MacCarthy was an honourable man.

== Under James II ==
Under the Catholic King James II, McCarthy was in 1686 promoted to Major General and became a member of the Privy Council of Ireland. He quarrelled with the Lord Lieutenant of Ireland, the 2nd Earl of Clarendon, and probably intrigued to secure Clarendon's recall.

In 1688 or early in 1689, Tyrconnell appointed him Muster-Master General in the Irish Army and Lord Lieutenant of County Cork.

On 23 May 1689, James II elevated Justin McCarthy to being Viscount Mountcashel, with the subsidiary title of Baron Castleinch. These titles were in what later became known as the Jacobite peerage.

Later in 1689, Lord Mountcashel, as he was now, took Castlemartyr and Bandon for James; at Bandon there was a massacre called "Bloody Monday", but Mountcashel persuaded the King to issue a general pardon to his defeated opponents. He met James II at his landing at Kinsale, and was commanded to raise seven regiments. He sat in the Irish House of Lords in the Parliament of 1689.

With 3,000 men he advanced from Dublin towards Enniskillen, which with Derry was one of the two places still resisting James II. He was met by 2,000 Protestant 'Inniskilleners' at the Battle of Newtownbutler on 31 July 1689. Mountcashel's forces were routed; he was wounded, then captured. Allowed out on parole he broke parole and escaped to Dublin; Schomberg remarked that he had thought McCarthy was a man of honour, but on the other hand he expected no better from an Irishman.

He went into exile in France and commanded the first Irish Brigade of Louis XIV.

== Marriage ==
He married Lady Arabella Wentworth, daughter of Thomas Wentworth, 1st Earl of Strafford and his second wife Lady Arabella Holles, who was many years older than himself; they had no documented or legally recognized children; however, it is believed his lineage continued.

== Death and timeline ==
His later career was hampered by his near-blindness. He died on 1 July 1694 N.S. at Barèges where he had gone to take the waters for his health and was buried there. At his death he tried to leave his property to a cousin, but it passed to his niece Catherine, sister of the 4th Earl of Clancarty. Her husband, Paul Davys, had the title Viscount Mount Cashell revived in his own favour.

Timeline
As his birth date is uncertain, so are all his ages.
Age	Date	Event
0	1643, about	Born, probably at Macroom Castle, County Cork, Ireland
5–6	1649, 15 Aug	Oliver Cromwell landed in Dublin
7–8	1651, early	Taken to France by his mother
8–9	1652, 27 Jun	Father surrendered Ross Castle.
14–15	1658, 27 Nov	Father created 1st Earl of Clancarty
16–17	1660	Parents returned to England and Ireland with the Restoration.
21–22	1665, 3 Jun O.S.	Brother Charles killed at the Battle of Lowestoft, a naval engagement with the Dutch
21–22	1665, 4 Aug	Father died in London.
22–23	1666, 22 Sep	Brother Charles's son died and his brother Callaghan succeeded as the 3rd Earl.
41–42	1685, 6 Feb	Accession of King James II, succeeding King Charles II
45–46	1689, 13 Feb	Accession of William and Mary, succeeding King James II
45–46	1689, 23 May	Created Viscount Mountcashel.
45–46	1689, 31 Jul	Lost the Battle of Newtownbutler and taken prisoner
50–51	1694, 21 Jul	Died at Barèges, France

== Notes and references ==
=== Sources ===
- Adams, Constance Louisa (1904). Castles of Ireland – Some Fortress Histories and Legends. London: Elliot Stock. OCLC 751487142.
- Bagwell, Richard (1909). Ireland under the Stuarts and under the Interregnum. Vol. II. London: Longmans, Green, and Co. OCLC 458582656. – 1642 to 1660
- Burke, Bernard (1866). A Genealogical History of the Dormant, Abeyant, Forfeited and Extinct Peerages of the British Empire (New ed.). London: Harrison. OCLC 11501348. (for MacCarty)
- Burke, Bernard; Burke, Ashworth Peter (1915). A Genealogical and Heraldic History of the Peerage and Baronetage, the Privy Council, Knightage and Companionage (77th ed.). London: Harrison. OCLC 1155471554. – (for Ormond)
- Burnet, Gilbert (1833). Routh, Martin Joseph (ed.). Bishop Burnet's History of His Own Time. Vol. II (2nd, enlarged ed.). Oxford: Oxford University Press. – 1673 to 1685
- Butler, William F. T. (1925). Gleanings from Irish History. London: Longmans, Green and Co. OCLC 557681240.
- Carte, Thomas (1851) [1st pub. 1736]. The Life of James Duke of Ormond. Vol. III (New ed.). Oxford: Oxford University Press. OCLC 1086656347. – 1643 to 1660
- Clark, Ruth (1921). Anthony Hamilton: his Life and Works and his Family. London: John Lane. OCLC 459281163.
- Coffey, Diarmid (1914). O'Neill and Ormond – A Chapter of Irish History. Dublin: Maunsel & Company. OCLC 906164979.
- Cokayne, George Edward (1893). Complete peerage of England, Scotland, Ireland, Great Britain and the United Kingdom, extant, extinct, or dormant. Vol. V (1st ed.). London: George Bell and Sons. OCLC 1180836840. – L to M
- Cokayne, George Edward (1895). Complete Peerage of England, Scotland, Ireland, Great Britain and the United Kingdom, Extant, Extinct, or Dormant. Vol. VI (1st ed.). London: George Bell and Sons. OCLC 1180818801. – N to R (for Ormond)
- Cokayne, George Edward (1913). Gibbs, Vicary (ed.). The complete peerage of England, Scotland, Ireland, Great Britain and the United Kingdom, extant, extinct, or dormant. Vol. III (2nd ed.). London: St Catherine Press. OCLC 228661424. – Canonteign to Cutts (for Clancarty)
- Cokayne, George Edward (1926). Gibbs, Vicary (ed.). The complete peerage of England, Scotland, Ireland, Great Britain and the United Kingdom, extant, extinct, or dormant. Vol. V (2nd ed.). London: St Catherine Press. OCLC 228661424. – Eardley of Spalding to Goojerat (for Fingall)
- Debrett, John (1828). Peerage of the United Kingdom of Great Britain and Ireland. Vol. II (17th ed.). London: F. C. and J. Rivington. OCLC 54499602. – Scotland and Ireland
- Firth, Charles Harding (1894) [1st pub. 1698]. The Memoirs of Edmund Ludlow Lieutenant-General of the Horse in the Army of the Commonwealth of England 1625–1672. Vol. I. Oxford: Clarendon Press. OCLC 1113948779. – 1625 to 1655
- Fryde, Edmund Boleslaw; Greenway, D. E.; Porter, S.; Roy, I., eds. (1986). Handbook of British Chronology. Royal Historical Society Guides and Handbooks, No. 2 (3rd ed.). London: Offices of the Royal Historical Society. ISBN 0-86193-106-8. – (for timeline)
- Harris, Walter (1747). A New History of the Life and Reign of William-Henry Prince of Orange and Nassau. Vol. II. Dublin: E. and J. Exshaw. OCLC 1096631168.
- Kenyon, John Philipps (1958). Robert Spencer Earl of Sunderland (1641–1702). Westport, Connecticut: Greenwood Press Publishers. ISBN 0-8371-8150-X.
- Kenyon, John Philipps (1972). The Popish Plot. New York. OCLC 1036783743.
- Lainé, P. Louis (1836). "Mac-Carthy". Archives généalogiques et historiques de la noblesse de France [Genealogical and Historical Archives of the Nobility of France] (in French). Vol. Tome cinquième. Paris: Imprimerie de Bethune et Plon. pp. 1–102. OCLC 865941166.
- Lodge, John (1789). Archdall, Mervyn (ed.). The Peerage of Ireland or, A Genealogical History of the Present Nobility of that Kingdom. Vol. IV. Dublin: James Moore. OCLC 264906028. – Viscounts (for Butler, Viscount Mountgarrett)
- Meehan, Rev. Charles Patrick (1882). The Confederation of Kilkenny (New revised and enlarged ed.). Dublin: James Duffy. OCLC 224157081.
- Murphy, John A. (1959). Justin MacCarthy, Lord Mountcashel, Commander of the First Irish brigade in France. Cork: Cork University Press. OCLC 6340176. – (Snippet view)
- O'Callaghan, John Cornelius (1854). History of the Irish Brigades in the Service of France. New York: P. O'Shea Publisher. OCLC 1046538374. (for its frontispiece)
- O'Hart, John (1892). Irish Pedigrees: Or, the Origin and Stem of the Irish Nation. Vol. I (5th ed.). Dublin: James Duffy & Co. OCLC 7239210. – Irish stem
- Ohlmeyer, Jane H. (2004). "MacCarthy, Donough, first earl of Clancarty (1594–1665)". In Matthew, Colin; Harrison, Brian (eds.). Oxford Dictionary of National Biography. Vol. 35. New York: Oxford University Press. pp. 107–108. ISBN 0-19-861385-7.
- Ruvigny, Melville Henry, Marquis de (1904). Jacobite Peerage Baronetage Knightage and Grants of Honour. Edinburgh: T C & E C Jack. OCLC 655825906.
- Seccombe, Thomas (1893). "MacCarthy or MacCarty, Donough, fourth Earl of Clancarty". In Lee, Sidney (ed.). Dictionary of National Biography. Vol. XXXIV. London: Smith, Elder, & Co. pp. 436–438. OCLC 8544105.
- Wauchope, Piers (2004). "MacCarthy, Justin, first Viscount Mountcashel (1643–1694)". In Matthew, Colin; Harrison, Brian (eds.). Oxford Dictionary of National Biography. Vol. 35. New York: Oxford University Press. pp. 111–112. ISBN 978-0-19-861385-5.
- Webb, Alfred (1878). "MacCarthy, Justin, Viscount Mountcashel". Compendium of Irish Biography. Dublin: M. H. Gill & Son. pp. 303–304. OCLC 122693688.
