= Callaghan MacCarty, 3rd Earl of Clancarty =

French seminarian and Irish earl (died 1676)

Callaghan MacCarty
- Earl of Clancarty
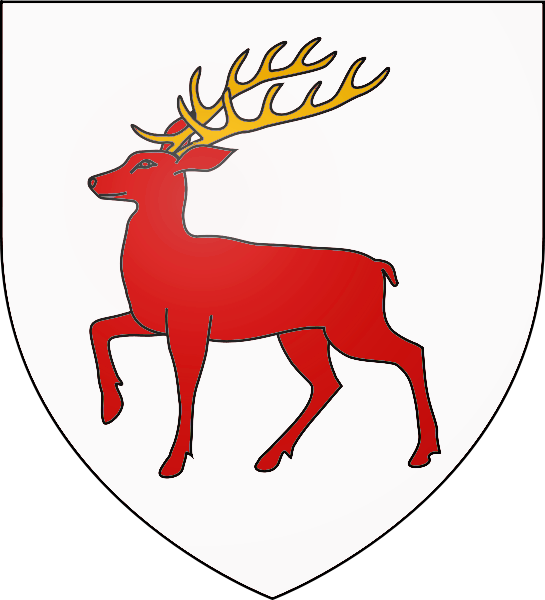
- Tenure: 1666–1676
- Predecessor: Charles, 2nd Earl of Clancarty (an infant)
- Successor: Donough, 4th Earl of Clancarty
- Known for: Former seminarian
- Died: 21 November 1676
- Spouse: Elizabeth FitzGerald
- Issue Detail: Donough & others
- Father: Donough, 1st Earl of Clancarty
- Mother: Eleanor Butler

Callaghan MacCarty, 3rd Earl of Clancarty (died 1676) was the second son of Donough MacCarty, 1st Earl of Clancarty. Callaghan was destined for a Catholic religious career and entered a seminary in France where his family was in exile during Cromwell's rule. When his elder brother died in the Battle of Lowestoft, and the 2nd Earl, his nephew, died in infancy, he unexpectedly left his religious institution, returned to Ireland, and assumed the title. He became a Protestant and married a Protestant wife. Late in life he converted back to Catholicism.

== Birth and origins ==
Callaghan was born in the late 1630s (Note: Callaghan's year of birth is bracketed between 1633 or 1634, the birth of his older brother, and about 1643, the birth of his younger brother.) in County Cork, most likely at Blarney Castle or Macroom Castle, residences of his parents. He was the second son of Donough MacCarty and his wife Eleanor Butler. At the time of his birth, Callaghan's father was the 2nd Viscount Muskerry, but he would be advanced to Earl of Clancarty in 1658. His father was a member of the MacCarthy of Muskerry dynasty, a Gaelic Irish family descended from the kings of Desmond.

Callaghan's mother was the eldest sister of James Butler, 1st Duke of Ormond. Her family, the Butler dynasty, was Old English and descended from Theobald Walter, who had been appointed Chief Butler of Ireland by King Henry II in 1177. Callaghan's parents were both Catholic; they had married before 1641. Callaghan had two brothers and two sisters, who are listed in his father's article.

Family tree

Callaghan MacCarty with wife, parents, and other selected relatives. (Note: This family tree is based on a two graphic trees and on written genealogies of the Earls of Clancarty, the MacCarthy of Muskerry family, and the Earls of Ormond. Also see the list of children in the text.)

Charles; 1st Viscount; Muskerry d. 1641	Margaret; O'Brien m. 1590	Thomas; Viscount; Thurles d. 1619 d.v.p.*	Elizabeth; Pointz
Donough; 1st Earl; 1594–1665	Eleanor; Butler; 1612–1682	James; 1st Duke; Ormond; 1610–1688
Charles; Viscount; Muskerry** c. 1633 – 1665 d.v.p.*	Callaghan; 3rd Earl d. 1676	Elizabeth; Fitz- Gerald d. 1698	Justin; Viscount; Mount- cashel c. 1643 – 1694
Charles; 2nd Earl; 1663–1666	Donough; 4th Earl; 1668–1734	Elizabeth; Spencer; 1671–1704
Robert; MacCarty; 1698–1769	Elizabeth; Farnelly

Legend

XXX	Callaghan; MacCarty	XXX	Viscounts Muskerry, & Earls of Clancarty	XXX	Dukes of Ormond

*d.v.p. = predeceased his father (decessit vita patris).
**courtesy title

== Irish wars ==
While Callaghan was a child, his father, Lord Muskerry, in March 1642 joined the Confederates to defend the Catholic faith and, as he thought, the King. Muskerry commanded the Confederates' Munster army in the Irish Confederate Wars. In October 1645 Giovanni Battista Rinuccini, the papal nuncio arrived in Ireland and visited Macroom Castle where Callaghan and his family were living. Muskerry disagreed with Rinuccini's policies and resigned early in August 1647 from his command.

In May 1647 Muskerry sent Callaghan's elder brother, Cormac, with a regiment to France to serve Louis XIV. After Rinuccini had left Ireland on 23 February 1649, Muskerry took up arms again to resist the Cromwellian Conquest of Ireland. He fought to the bitter end and surrendered Ross Castle near Killarney to Edmund Ludlow on 27 June 1652, disbanding his 5000-strong army.

To guarantee his compliance with the terms, Muskerry gave one of his sons to Ludlow as hostage. This must have been Callaghan, aged about 14, as his eldest, Cormac, was away with his regiment in France and Justin, aged 9, was probably with his mother in exile, also in France.

== Exile ==
Muskerry was allowed to embark to Spain. The family's estates were lost in the Act of Settlement of 1652, passed by the English Rump Parliament on 12 August.

Some time before the fall of Ross Castle, Muskerry had sent his wife, Callaghan's mother, to safety in France. She was probably accompanied by Callaghan's youngest brother, Justin, and his sisters. His mother lived with her sister Mary Butler, Lady Hamilton, in the convent of the Feuillantines in Paris. In the late 1650s Callaghan entered a seminary in France.

On 27 November 1658 his father was created Earl of Clancarty by Charles II in Brussels, where the King was then in exile. By this advancement the title of Viscount of Muskerry became a subsidiary title of the family, which was given as a courtesy title to the Earl's heir apparent. Callaghan's elder brother Charles (or Cormac) was from there on styled Lord Muskerry.

== Restoration ==
At the Restoration, Callaghan, aged about 13, and his elder brother, Cormac, stayed behind in France, while his parents, his younger brother, Justin, and his sisters returned to the British Isles. Cormac stayed behind in Dunkirk with his regiment, whereas Callaghan continued to prepare for the priesthood in a French seminary, (Note: Cokayne 1913 maintains he was a monk but this seems to be wrong.) In 1662 his father, Earl Clancarty, recovered his estates in the Act of Settlement. By 1664 Callaghan was a student at the Irish College in Toulouse. This was a small school with historic links to Munster. It never had more than 12 students.

== Earl of Clancarty ==
On 4 March 1665, the Second Anglo-Dutch War broke out. Three months into the war, on 3 June 1665 O.S., his brother Charles, Lord Muskerry, was killed on the flagship, the Royal Charles, in the Battle of Lowestoft, the first major naval engagement of the war and an English victory. His brother had an infant son, also named Charles, who succeeded him as heir apparent and Viscount of Muskerry. However, their father, the 1st Earl, died two months later, on 4 August 1665, and the younger Charles succeeded as the 2nd Earl of Clancarty. The 2nd Earl died about a year later, on 22 September 1666, still an infant. (Note: The 2nd Earl's date of death seems to be in dispute. This text follows the more recent publication, Cokayne (1913), which gives 22 September 1666, whereas Burke (1866) gives 1668.)

At this point Justin, the third son, expected to succeed as 3rd Earl, as Callaghan, being in holy orders, would be passed over, but Callaghan hearing of the opening of the succession decided to claim the title. He left his college at Toulouse and returned to Ireland, where he conformed to the established religion, leaving the Catholic Church and joining the Protestant Church of Ireland. He therefore succeeded as the 3rd Earl of Clancarty.

== Marriage and children ==
In 1667 Lord Clancarty, as he was now, married Elizabeth FitzGerald, sixth and youngest daughter of George FitzGerald, 16th Earl of Kildare and his wife Lady Joan Boyle. The FitzGeralds were an Old English family whose ancestor came to Ireland during the Norman invasion of that country. His wife has been described as "a fierce Protestant isolated in a Catholic family".

Callaghan and Elizabeth had one son:

1. Donough (1668–1734), became the 4th and last Earl of Clancarty

—and four daughters of whom three are known by name:

1. Catharine, married Paul Davys, 1st Viscount Mount Cashell
2. Margaret, died childless
3. Elizabeth, died childless

== Death, succession, and timeline ==
Clancarty died of a stroke ("Apoplexy") on 21 November 1676 in Dublin, aged about 38. He died "out of the community of the Church of England" and seemed to have returned to his original Catholic religion some time after his marriage. He was buried in Christ Church Cathedral, Dublin. He was succeeded by his only son Donough, aged eight at the time. His widow remarried to Sir William Davys, Lord Chief Justice of Ireland, and died in 1698.

Timeline
As his birth date is uncertain, so are all his ages.
Age	Date	Event
0	1638, estimate	Born in Ireland (Note: For the needs of the timeline, Callaghan's birth year is assumed to be 1638, as his older brother was born in 1633 or 1634 and his younger brother was born about 1643.)
6–7	1645, Oct	Met Rinuccini, the papal nuncio, at Macroom Castle where he was living
10–11	1649, 23 Feb	Rinuccini, the papal nuncio, left Ireland.
10–11	1649, 15 Aug	Oliver Cromwell landed in Dublin.
13–14	1652, 27 Jun	Father surrendered Ross Castle.
19–20	1658, 27 Nov	Father created 1st Earl of Clancarty.
21–22	1660	Parents and brother Justin returned to England and Ireland with the Restoration.
26–27	1665, 3 Jun O.S.	Brother Charles killed at the Battle of Lowestoft, a naval engagement with the Dutch.
26–27	1665, 4 Aug	Father died in London.
27–28	1666, 22 Sep	Succeeded his nephew as the 3rd Earl of Clancarty
28–29	1667, about	Married Elizabeth FitzGerald
37–38	1676, 21 Nov	Died

== Notes and references ==
=== Sources ===
Subject matter monographs:

- Click here. Creighton in Dictionary of Irish Biography
- Boyle, Patrick (1910). "Irish Colleges". In Herbermann, Charles George (ed.). Catholic Encyclopedia. Vol. VIII. New York: The Encyclopedia Press. pp. 158–163. OCLC 1157968788.
- Burke, Bernard (1866). A Genealogical History of the Dormant, Abeyant, Forfeited and Extinct Peerages of the British Empire (New ed.). London: Harrison. OCLC 11501348. (for MacCarty)
- Burke, Bernard; Burke, Ashworth Peter (1915). A Genealogical and Heraldic History of the Peerage and Baronetage, the Privy Council, Knightage and Companionage (77th ed.). London: Harrison. OCLC 1155471554. – (for Ormond)
- Butler, William F. T. (1925). Gleanings from Irish History. London: Longmans, Green and Co. OCLC 557681240.
- Carte, Thomas (1851) [1st pub. 1736]. The Life of James Duke of Ormond. Vol. III (New ed.). Oxford: Oxford University Press. OCLC 1086656347. – 1643 to 1660
- Clark, Ruth (1921). Anthony Hamilton: his Life and Works and his Family. London: John Lane. OCLC 459281163.
- Coffey, Diarmid (1914). O'Neill and Ormond – A Chapter of Irish History. Dublin: Maunsel & Company. OCLC 906164979.
- Cokayne, George Edward (1893). Complete peerage of England, Scotland, Ireland, Great Britain and the United Kingdom, extant, extinct, or dormant. Vol. V (1st ed.). London: George Bell and Sons. OCLC 1180836840. – L to M (for Mountcashel)
- Cokayne, George Edward (1913). Gibbs, Vicary (ed.). The complete peerage of England, Scotland, Ireland, Great Britain and the United Kingdom, extant, extinct, or dormant. Vol. III (2nd ed.). London: St Catherine Press. OCLC 228661424. – Canonteign to Cutts (for Clancarty)
- Creighton, Anne (October 2009). McGuire, James; Quinn, James (eds.). "MacCarthy, Callaghan". Dictionary of Irish Biography.
- D'Alton, Rev. Edward Alfred (1910). History of Ireland from the Earliest Times to the Present Day. Vol. Half-volume IV. London: The Gresham Publishing Company. OCLC 749686820. – 1649 to 1782
- Debrett, John (1828). Peerage of the United Kingdom of Great Britain and Ireland. Vol. II (17th ed.). London: F. C. and J. Rivington. OCLC 54499602. – Scotland and Ireland
- Firth, Charles Harding (1894) [1st pub. 1698]. The Memoirs of Edmund Ludlow Lieutenant-General of the Horse in the Army of the Commonwealth of England 1625–1672. Vol. I. Oxford: Clarendon Press. OCLC 1113948779. – 1625 to 1655
- Firth, Charles Harding; Rait, R. S. (1911). The Acts and Ordinances of the Interregnum. Vol. II. London: His/Her Majesty's Stationery Office. OCLC 271021959.
- Kenyon, John Philipps (1958). Robert Spencer Earl of Sunderland (1641–1702). Westport, Connecticut: Greenwood Press Publishers. ISBN 0-8371-8150-X.
- Lainé, P. Louis (1836). "Mac-Carthy". Archives généalogiques et historiques de la noblesse de France [Genealogical and Historical Archives of the Nobility of France] (in French). Vol. Tome cinquième. Paris: Imprimerie de Bethune et Plon. pp. 1–102. OCLC 865941166.
- Lodge, John (1789a). Archdall, Mervyn (ed.). The Peerage of Ireland or, A Genealogical History of the Present Nobility of that Kingdom. Vol. I. Dublin: James Moore. OCLC 264906028. – Blood royal, dukes, earls (for Earl of Kildare)
- Lodge, John (1789b). Archdall, Mervyn (ed.). The Peerage of Ireland or, A Genealogical History of the Present Nobility of that Kingdom. Vol. IV. Dublin: James Moore. OCLC 264906028. – Viscounts (for Thurles)
- McCarthy, Samuel Trant (1922). The MacCarthys of Munster. Dundalk: The Dundalgan Press. OCLC 1157128759.
- Meehan, Rev. Charles Patrick (1882). The Confederation of Kilkenny (New revised and enlarged ed.). Dublin: James Duffy. OCLC 224157081.
- M'Enery, M. J. (1904). "A Diary of the Siege of Limerick Castle, 1642". The Journal of the Royal Society of Antiquaries of Ireland. 5th. 34 (2): 163–187. JSTOR 25507363.
- Moody, Theodore William; Martin, F. X.; Byrne, Francis John, eds. (1984). A New History of Ireland. Vol. IX:Maps, Genealogies, Lists. Oxford: Oxford University Press. ISBN 0-19-821745-5.
- Murphy, John A. (1959). Justin MacCarthy, Lord Mountcashel, Commander of the First Irish brigade in France. Cork: Cork University Press. OCLC 6340176. – (Snippet view)
- O'Hart, John (1892). Irish Pedigrees: Or, the Origin and Stem of the Irish Nation. Vol. I (5th ed.). Dublin: James Duffy & Co. OCLC 7239210. – Irish stem
- Ohlmeyer, Jane H. (2004). "MacCarthy, Donough, first earl of Clancarty (1594–1665)". In Matthew, Colin; Harrison, Brian (eds.). Oxford Dictionary of National Biography. Vol. 35. New York: Oxford University Press. pp. 107–108. ISBN 0-19-861385-7.
- O'Sullivan, Mary Donovan (1983) [1st pub. 1942]. Old Galloway: the history of a Norman colony in Ireland. Galway: Kennys Bookshops and Art Galleries. ISBN 978-0-906312-21-6.
- Seccombe, Thomas (1893). "MacCarthy or MacCarty, Donough, fourth Earl of Clancarty". In Lee, Sidney (ed.). Dictionary of National Biography. Vol. XXXIV. London: Smith, Elder, & Co. pp. 436–438. OCLC 8544105.
- Webb, Alfred (1878). "MacCarty, Donough, Viscount Muskerry, Earl of Clancarty". Compendium of Irish Biography. Dublin: M. H. Gill & Son. p. 303, right column. OCLC 122693688. – (for his father)

Peerage of Ireland
Preceded by Charles MacCarty	Earl of Clancarty; 1666–1676	Succeeded by Donough MacCarty
