= Charles MacCarty, Viscount Muskerry =

Irish soldier (died 1665)

Charles MacCarty
- Viscount Muskerry (courtesy title)
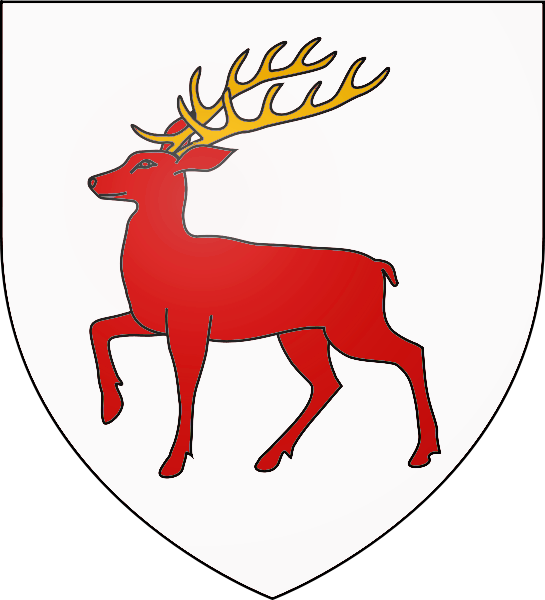
- Born: 1633 or 1634
- Died: 3 June 1665
- Spouse: Margaret Bourke
- Issue Detail: Frances & Charles
- Father: Donough, 1st Earl of Clancarty
- Mother: Eleanor Butler

Charles MacCarty, Viscount Muskerry (1633 or 1634 – 1665), called Cormac in Irish, commanded a royalist battalion at the Battle of the Dunes during the interregnum. He was heir apparent to Donough MacCarty, 1st Earl of Clancarty but was killed at the age of 31 at the Battle of Lowestoft, a sea-fight against the Dutch, during the Second Anglo-Dutch War, and thus never succeeded to the earldom. He was buried in Westminster Abbey.

== Birth and origins ==
Charles (i.e. Cormac) was born in 1633 or 1634, (Note: Knowing that Charles died on 3 June 1635, aged 31, he must have been born between the 4 June 1633 and the 3 June 1634.) probably at Macroom Castle, County Cork, Ireland, his parents' habitual residence. He was the eldest son of Donough MacCarty and his wife Eleanor (or Ellen) Butler. He is also known as Cormac and this seems to have been his original name, whereas Charles seems to be a later English or French adaptation. At the time of his birth, Charles's father was the 2nd Viscount Muskerry, but he would be advanced to Earl of Clancarty in 1658. His father's family were the MacCartys of Muskerry, a Gaelic Irish dynasty that branched from the MacCarthy-Mor line with Dermot MacCarthy, second son of Cormac MacCarthy-Mor, a medieval Prince of Desmond. This second son had been granted the Muskerry area as appanage.

Family tree

Charles (Cormac) MacCarty with wife, parents, and other selected relatives. (Note: This family tree is based on a two graphic trees and on written genealogies of the Earls of Clancarty, the MacCarthy of Muskerry family, and the Earls of Ormond. Also see the list of children in the text.)

Charles; 1st Viscount; Muskerry; 1564–1641	Margaret; O'Brien	Thomas; Viscount; Thurles d. 1619 d.v.p.*	Elizabeth; Pointz
Donough; 1st Earl; 1594–1665	Eleanor; Butler; 1612–1682	James; 1st Duke; Ormond; 1610–1688
Charles; Viscount; Muskerry** c. 1633 – 1665 d.v.p.*	Margaret; Bourke d. 1698	Callaghan; 3rd Earl c. 1638 – 1676	Elizabeth; Fitz- Gerald d. 1698
Charles James; 2nd Earl; 1663–1666 infant	Donough; 4th Earl; 1668–1734	Elizabeth; Spencer; 1671–1704

Legend

XXX	Subject of the article	XXX	Viscounts Muskerry & Earls of Clancarty	XXX	Dukes of Ormond

*d.v.p. = predeceased his father (decessit vita patris)
**courtesy title

Charles's mother (1612–1682) was the eldest sister of James Butler, the future Duke of Ormond. Her family, the Butler dynasty, was Old English and descended from Theobald Walter, who had been appointed Chief Butler of Ireland by King Henry II in 1177. Charles's parents were both Catholic. He had two brothers and two sisters, who are listed in his father's article.

== Irish wars ==
At the time of his birth, Ireland enjoyed a period of peace between the end of Tyrone's Rebellion (1593–1603) and the Irish Rebellion of 1641. His father, after some hesitation, joined the Confederates in March 1642 and fought in that year at the Siege of Limerick and the Battle of Liscarroll.

In 1645 Pope Innocent X sent Giovanni Battista Rinuccini as nuncio to Ireland. Rinuccini landed at Kenmare, County Kerry. and passed by Macroom Castle on his way to Kilkenny. Cormac, about 11 years old, met Rinuccini, who was welcomed by his mother at the castle. His father opposed Rinuccini and was detained when Rinuccini overturned the Confederate government in a coup d'état.

in May 1647, when Charles was but 13 years old, his father sent him to France with a regiment to take service in Louis XIV's army. Charles sailed from Waterford on 15 May 1647. He was accompanied by John Callaghan, a Catholic priest and Jansenist, who was his tutor.

In April 1650 his family lost Macroom Castle, where Charles had spent his childhood, in the context of the Battle of Macroom. Around that time, anticipating the loss of Macroom or because of it, his father sent Cormac's mother, sisters and youngest brother to security in France. His mother then lived in Paris, where she rented an apartment in the convent of the Feuillantines.

After Rinuccini's departure, his father took up arms again to fight the Cromwellians but was defeated in 1651 by Broghill at Knocknaclashy and surrendered his last stronghold, Ross Castle, to Edmund Ludlow in 1652.

== On the continent ==
In France, MacCarty (Charles or Cormac) and his Irish regiment were employed to fight the Spanish in the Franco-Spanish War (1635–1659) on the border between France and the Spanish Netherlands.

=== Condé-sur-l'Escaut ===
MacCarty's regiment was part of the garrison of Condé-sur-l'Escaut when the town was taken by the Spanish shortly after their victory over the French at the Battle of Valenciennes on 16 July 1656.

King Charles II, in exile in the Spanish Netherlands since March 1656, sent the Marquess of Ormond, MacCarty's uncle, to ask him to join him with his regiment. He refused to change sides without having laid down his commission in proper form. Having done this, however, he obeyed his king and changed sides together with his regiment, thereafter serving Charles II in Spanish pay. This regiment was then called the Duke of York's regiment after Charles II's brother the Duke of York and future James II.

=== Battle of the Dunes ===
MacCarty fought with his regiment at the Battle of the Dunes on 14 June 1658 where it formed part of the English royalist army under the Duke of York that fought together with the Spanish on the losing side against the victorious French and Protectorate English.

On 27 November 1658 his father was created Earl of Clancarty by Charles II in Brussels. By this advancement, the title of Viscount of Muskerry became the highest subsidiary title of the family, which was then given as courtesy title to the Earl's heir apparent. In consequence, MacCarty was styled Viscount Muskerry thereafter.

== Restoration ==
At the Restoration Muskerry, as he now was, did not accompany the king to Dover in May 1660 but stayed with his regiment at Dunkirk until at least March 1662. He seems to have left shortly before the Sale of Dunkirk in November 1662. His father, the 1st Earl of Clancarty, had meanwhile returned to Ireland and recovered his estates by virtue of Charles II "Gracious Declaration" of the 30 November 1660. His father sat as Lord Clancarty in the Irish Parliament of 1661–1666 and was part of a committee that organised a gift of £30,000 for the Duke of Ormond. On 19 August 1662, Muskerry was called to the parliament to replace his father on that committee.

== Marriage and children ==
In 1660 or 1661 Muskerry married Margaret Bourke, a rich heiress, the only child of Ulick Burke, 1st Marquess of Clanricarde and Lady Anne Compton.

Charles and Margaret had a girl and a boy:

1. Frances (1662–1675), died young
2. Charles (1663–1666), succeeded his grandfather as the 2nd Earl, but died as an infant

== Life at the Restoration court ==
Lord and Lady Muskerry frequently attended the court at Whitehall. In July 1663 they went with the court to take the waters at Tunbridge Wells during which visit the Muskerrys as well as Elizabeth Hamilton and Elizabeth Wetenhall stayed at nearby Somerhill House, which had been built by Lady Muskerry's grandfather, Richard Burke, 4th Earl of Clanricarde and had been given back to her at the Restoration. This visit to Tunbridge is described by Antoine Hamilton in his semi-fictional Mémoires du comte de Gramont (written 1704–1710).

The Mémoires du comte de Gramont (Chapter 7) tell how Elizabeth Hamilton made fun of Lady Muskerry by making her believe that the King had invited her to a masquerade and that she had to disguise herself as a Babylonian woman. She was however not invited to this masquerade, which took place in February 1665.

== Death, succession, and timeline ==
The Second Anglo-Dutch War broke out on 4 March 1665. Muskerry was killed on 3 June 1665 in the Battle of Lowestoft, a naval engagement, on board of the flagship, the Royal Charles, by a cannonball, which also killed Charles Berkeley, 1st Earl of Falmouth. He was 31 years old. Muskerry was buried on 19 June with great pomp at Westminster Abbey.

Muskerry had an infant son, Charles James, who succeeded him as heir apparent and Viscount of Muskerry. However, the 1st Earl, his father, died on 4 August 1665 surviving him by only two months, and the little Charles James, therefore, succeeded as the 2nd Earl but died about a year later, on 22 September 1666, still an infant. Thereupon Callaghan, his uncle, succeeded as the 3rd Earl of Clancarty.

His widow made two further marriages: to Robert Villiers, and to Robert Fielding. She died in 1698 at Somerhill House. Her widower made a scandalous and bigamous marriage to Barbara Palmer, 1st Duchess of Cleveland, former royal mistress of Charles II.

Timeline
Age	Date	Event
0	1633 or 1634	Born, probably at Macroom Castle
8	1642, Mar	Father joined the Confederates.
11	1645, Oct	Met Rinuccini, the papal nuncio, at Macroom Castle where he was living
12	1646, Sep	Rinuccini overturned the Confederate government in a coup d'état.
13	1647, May	Went to France with a regiment
15	1649, 30 Jan	King Charles I beheaded.
15	1649, 15 Aug	Oliver Cromwell landed in Dublin
17–18	1651, early	Mother and his young siblings fled to France.
18	1652, 27 Jun	Father surrendered Ross Castle to the Parliamentarians.
22	1656, 2 Apr	Charles concluded the Treaty of Brussels with Spain.
22–23	1656	Surrendered to the Spanish at the capture of Condé-sur-l'Escaut
24	1658, 14 Jun N.S.	Commanded a battalion at the Battle of the Dunes
24	1658, 3 Sep	Oliver Cromwell died.
24	1658, 27 Nov	Became Viscount Muskerry as his father was promoted Earl of Clancarty
26	1660, 29 May	Restoration of King Charles II
27–28	1661	Came back to England and Ireland after the Restoration
27–28	1661, about	Married Margaret Bourke, only child of Ulick Burke, 1st Marquess of Clanricarde
28–29	1662	Daughter Frances born
31	1665, 3 Jun O.S.	Killed at the Battle of Lowestoft, a naval engagement with the Dutch

== Notes and references ==
=== Sources ===
Subject matter monographs:

- Click here. Webb 1878 in Compendium of Irish Biography

—

- Adams, Constance Louisa (1904). Castles of Ireland – Some Fortress Histories and Legends. London: Elliot Stock. OCLC 751487142.
- Airy, Osmund (1905). The English Restoration and Louis XIV. London: Longmans, Green, and Co. OCLC 651778597.
- Bagwell, Richard (1909). Ireland under the Stuarts and under the Interregnum. Vol. II. London: Longmans, Green, and Co. OCLC 458582656. – 1642 to 1660
- Butler, William F. T. (1925). Gleanings from Irish History. London: Longmans, Green and Co. OCLC 557681240.
- Burke, Bernard (1866). A Genealogical History of the Dormant, Abeyant, Forfeited and Extinct Peerages of the British Empire (New ed.). London: Harrison. OCLC 11501348. – (for MacCarty)
- Burke, Bernard; Burke, Ashworth Peter (1915). A Genealogical and Heraldic History of the Peerage and Baronetage, the Privy Council, Knightage and Companionage (77th ed.). London: Harrison. OCLC 1155471554. – (for Ormond)
- Carte, Thomas (1851) [1st pub. 1736]. The Life of James Duke of Ormond. Vol. III (New ed.). Oxford: Oxford University Press. OCLC 1086656347. – 1643 to 1660
- Chester, Joseph Lemuel (1876). Registers of Westminster Abbey. London: Private Edition. OCLC 1140248. – Marriages, baptisms and burials from about 1660 to 1875
- Clark, Ruth (1921). Anthony Hamilton: his Life and Works and his Family. London: John Lane. OCLC 459281163.
- Clark, Ruth (1972) [1st pub. 1932]. Strangers and Sojourners at Port Royal. New York: Octagon Books. ISBN 0-374-91664-0.
- Coffey, Diarmid (1914). O'Neill and Ormond – A Chapter of Irish History. Dublin: Maunsel & Company. OCLC 906164979.
- Cokayne, George Edward (1913). Gibbs, Vicary (ed.). The complete peerage of England, Scotland, Ireland, Great Britain and the United Kingdom, extant, extinct, or dormant. Vol. III (2nd ed.). London: St Catherine Press. OCLC 228661424. – Canonteign to Cutts (for Clancarty)
- Cunningham, Peter (1888). "Appendix A: On the chronology of the English portion of de Grammont's memoirs". The Story of Nell Gwyn. New York: J. Wiley's sons. OCLC 663332125.
- Debrett, John (1828). Peerage of the United Kingdom of Great Britain and Ireland. Vol. II (17th ed.). London: F. C. and J. Rivington. OCLC 54499602. – Scotland and Ireland
- Evelyn, John (1901). Bray, William (ed.). The Diary of John Evelyn. Vol. II (New, in two volumes ed.). New York & London: M. Walter Dunn. OCLC 954140620. – 1665 to 1706
- Firth, Charles Harding (1888). "Cromwell, Oliver (1599–1658)". In Lee, Sidney (ed.). Dictionary of National Biography. Vol. XIII. New York: MacMillan and Co. pp. 155–186. OCLC 1043016614.
- Firth, Charles Harding (1894) [1st pub. 1698]. The Memoirs of Edmund Ludlow Lieutenant-General of the Horse in the Army of the Commonwealth of England 1625–1672. Vol. I. Oxford: Clarendon Press. OCLC 1113948779. – 1625 to 1655
- Firth, Charles Harding (1903). "Royalist and Cromwellian Armies in Flanders (1657–1662)". Transactions of the Royal Historical Society. New Series. 17: 67–119. doi:10.2307/3678138. JSTOR 3678138. S2CID 163012566.
- Fraser, Antonia (1980) [1st pub. 1979]. Royal Charles: Charles II and the Restoration. New York: Dell Publishing. ISBN 0-440-56960-5.
- Fryde, Edmund Boleslaw; Greenway, D. E.; Porter, S.; Roy, I., eds. (1986). Handbook of British Chronology. Royal Historical Society Guides and Handbooks, No. 2 (3rd ed.). London: Offices of the Royal Historical Society. ISBN 0-86193-106-8. – (for timeline)
- Hamilton, Anthony (1930). Memoirs of the Comte de Gramont. Translated by Quennell, Peter. New York: E. P. Dutton and Company. OCLC 1150292676.
- House of Lords (1779). Journals of the House of Lords (PDF). Vol. I. Dublin: William Sleater. OCLC 35009219. – 1634 to 1699
- Hyde, Edward (1827). The Life of Edward Earl of Clarendon. Vol. II (A new ed.). Oxford: The Clarendon Printing House. OCLC 1283560. – 1661 to 1665
- Lainé, P. Louis (1836). "Mac-Carthy". Archives généalogiques et historiques de la noblesse de France [Genealogical and Historical Archives of the Nobility of France] (in French). Vol. Tome cinquième. Paris: Imprimerie de Bethune et Plon. pp. 1–102. OCLC 865941166.
- Lodge, John (1789a). Archdall, Mervyn (ed.). The Peerage of Ireland or, A Genealogical History of the Present Nobility of that Kingdom. Vol. I. Dublin: James Moore. OCLC 264906028. – Blood royal, dukes, earls (for Clanricarde)
- Lodge, John (1789b). Archdall, Mervyn (ed.). The Peerage of Ireland or, A Genealogical History of the Present Nobility of that Kingdom. Vol. IV. Dublin: James Moore. OCLC 264906028. – Viscounts (for Thurles)
- Meehan, Rev. Charles Patrick (1882). The Confederation of Kilkenny (New revised and enlarged ed.). Dublin: James Duffy. OCLC 224157081.
- M'Enery, M. J. (1904). "A Diary of the Siege of Limerick Castle, 1642". The Journal of the Royal Society of Antiquaries of Ireland. 5th. 34 (2): 163–187. JSTOR 25507363.
- Millar, Alexander Hastie (1890). "Hamilton, James, first Earl of Abercorn (d.1617)". In Lee, Sidney (ed.). Dictionary of National Biography. Vol. XXIV. New York: MacMillan and Co. pp. 176–177. OCLC 8544105.
- Moody, Theodore William; Martin, F. X.; Byrne, Francis John, eds. (1984). A New History of Ireland. Vol. IX:Maps, Genealogies, Lists. Oxford: Oxford University Press. ISBN 0-19-821745-5.
- O'Hart, John (1892). Irish Pedigrees: Or, the Origin and Stem of the Irish Nation. Vol. I (5th ed.). Dublin: James Duffy & Co. OCLC 7239210. – Irish stem
- Ohlmeyer, Jane H. (2004). "MacCarthy, Donough, first earl of Clancarty (1594–1665)". In Matthew, Colin; Harrison, Brian (eds.). Oxford Dictionary of National Biography. Vol. 35. New York: Oxford University Press. pp. 107–108. ISBN 0-19-861385-7.
- Ohlmeyer, Jane H. (2012). Making Ireland English: The Irish Aristocracy in the Seventeenth Century. New Haven, Connecticut: Yale University Press. ISBN 978-0-300-11834-6. – (Preview)
- Pepys, Samuel (1894). Wheatley, Henry Benjamin (ed.). The Diary of Samuel Pepys. Vol. IV. London: George Bell and Sons. OCLC 503692830. – 1 January 1664 to 29/30 June 1665
- Phippen, James (1840). Colbran's New Guide to Tunbridge Wells. London: John Lane. OCLC 1040669272.
- Stuart, James (1962) [1st pub. 1696]. The Memoirs of James II. Translated by Sells, A. Lytton. Bloomington, Indiana: Indiana University Press. OCLC 340343.
- Turner, David (2004). "Feilding, Robert (1650/51–1712)". In Matthew, Colin; Harrison, Brian (eds.). Oxford Dictionary of National Biography. Vol. 19. New York: Oxford University Press. pp. 242–243. ISBN 0-19-861369-5.
- Webb, Alfred (1878). "MacCarthy, Charles". Compendium of Irish Biography. Dublin: M. H. Gill & Son. p. 303, right column, line 53. OCLC 122693688.
- Wills, Rev. James (1841). "Ulick, fifth Earl of Clanricarde". Lives of Illustrious and Distinguished Irishmen, from the earliest times to the present period. Vol. III. Glasgow: MacGregor, Polson & Co. pp. 74–78. OCLC 1048786228.
