= Capture of Bandon =

1689 capture of Bandon, Ireland from Protestants

- Part of Williamite War in Ireland
Date	February–March 1689
Location	Bandon, County Cork, Ireland
Result	Jacobite victory

Belligerents
Williamites	Jacobites

Commanders and leaders
Unknown	Justin McCarthy

Strength
Unknown	Unknown

Casualties and losses
Light	Light

The Capture of Bandon occurred in 1689 when the town of Bandon in County Cork, Ireland was forcibly seized from its rebellious Protestant inhabitants by force of Irish Army troops under Justin McCarthy. The skirmishing at the town took place during the early stages of the Williamite War in Ireland. The Jacobite success at Bandon helped suppress any chance of a general Munster uprising against the rule of James II similar to that which occurred in Ulster the same year. The slogan "No Surrender!" is believed to have been first used at Bandon and subsequently taken up, more famously, by the defenders at the Siege of Derry the same year.

== Background ==
In 1685, the Catholic James II had come to the throne. This led to a sharp reversal of government policy in Ireland, which had previously favoured the Protestant inhabitants. This was quickly changed by James' representative Richard Talbot, 1st Earl of Tyrconnell. Under Tyrconnell's administration, the army and civil government were mostly purged by Protestants, who were replaced by Catholics. In Bandon, the previous town burgesses were replaced by Catholic nominees.

Tyrconnell's actions led to a growing hostility amongst the Protestant inhabitants across the island towards the King and his Irish government. Bandon was a historic centre of Protestants, dating back to the Plantation of Munster in the Elizabethan era and was a natural focus of dissent against James's rule. In 1688, a similar opposition in England led to the Glorious Revolution, in which William III successfully invaded with a Dutch Army. Many Protestants now believed William to be their rightful King while Catholics, and some Protestants, remained loyal to James. During the growing turmoil, many rural County Cork Protestants came to shelter in Bandon.

== Uprising ==
Fearing a potential outbreak of rebellion in Bandon would occur, the government sent a detachment of the Irish Army under Captain Daniel O'Neill to take the town. They reportedly entered on a Sunday morning while the inhabitants were attending church services. The following day on the 24th of February, sometimes referred to as "Black Monday", the townspeople rose and attacked the soldiers. Various sources say between three and eight of the redcoats were killed and the remainder were driven out of the town. Using their captured weapons, the Protestants then made an effort to prepare Bandon to withstand an assault.

Having received word about the growing rebellion in the county, Tyrconnell in Dublin had already dispatched six companies of infantry under Justin McCarthy, an experienced Irish Catholic soldier. Instead of immediately assaulting Bandon, McCarthy had first seized nearby Cork, another major centre of Protestants in the south of the country, and clamped down on other potential dissidents. He then proceeded to Bandon with his troops, plus some cavalry and artillery. Although they had previously hung out a banner proclaiming "No Surrender", the defenders negotiated a surrender in exchange for generous conditions. Despite the usual punishment for rebellion being death, the town corporation was fined £1,000 and the walls were ordered to be demolished.

The comparatively light terms imposed on the town were part of a wider attempt by King James to convince Protestants of his goodwill towards them. It angered more hardline Catholics, including McCarthy's nephew Lord Clancarty, who wanted a harsher punishment for the rebels.

== Aftermath ==
The fighting at Bandon was part of a succession of defeats of locally raised Protestant troops both across Munster (at Castlemartyr) and Ireland as a whole, with the Ulster-raised Army of the North suffering heavy defeats at the Break of Dromore and the Battle of Cladyford. The advance of the mainly Catholic Jacobite Army was halted by the successful Protestant Defence of Enniskillen and Derry. The arrival of large-scale reinforcements under Marshal Schomberg and King William reversed the tide, and Dublin was captured following the Battle of the Boyne in 1690. The same year, Bandon was re-taken by Protestant forces following Marlborough's successful Siege of Cork. The walls were not rebuilt, as they were becoming increasingly militarily obsolete.

== Bibliography ==
- Childs, John. The Williamite Wars in Ireland. Bloomsbury Publishing, 2007.
- Wauchope, Piers. Patrick Sarsfield and the Williamite War. Irish Academic Press, 1992.
