= Tryphon (play) =

1668 play

- Original language: English
- Written by: Roger Boyle, 1st Earl of Orrery
- Genre: Tragedy

Premiere
- Date: December 1668
- Place: Lincoln's Inn Fields Theatre, London

Tryphon is a 1668 tragedy by the Irish writer Roger Boyle, 1st Earl of Orrery. It was originally staged by the Duke's Company at the Lincoln's Inn Fields Theatre in London. The original cast is unknown.

The opening prologue of the play is an interaction between a character named Nokes and a character named Angles where they discuss the merits of including or not including a prologue to the play. https://xtf.lib.virginia.edu/xtf/view?docId=chadwyck_evd/uvaGenText/tei/chevd_V2.0124.xml&chunk.id=d4&toc.id=&brand=default

== Bibliography ==
- Keenan, Tim. Restoration Staging, 1660-74. Taylor & Francis, 2016.
- Maguire, Nancy Klein. Regicide and Restoration: English Tragicomedy, 1660-1671. Cambridge University Press, 1992.
- Van Lennep, W. The London Stage, 1660-1800: Volume One, 1660-1700. Southern Illinois University Press, 1960.
