= Donough MacCarthy, 4th Earl of Clancarty =

Irish earl (1668–1734)

Donough MacCarthy
- Earl of Clancarty
- Tenure: 1676–1734
- Predecessor: Callaghan, 3rd Earl of Clancarty
- Born: 1668
- Died: 1 October 1734
- Noble family: MacCarthy of Muskerry
- Spouse: Elizabeth Spencer
- Issue Detail: Robert, Justin, & Charlotte
- Father: Callaghan, 3rd Earl of Clancarty
- Mother: Elizabeth Fitzgerald

Donough MacCarthy, 4th Earl of Clancarty (1668–1734) fought for James II in the Williamite War in Ireland at the Siege of Derry. He was attainted in 1691 after the defeat. MacCarthy went into exile to the Netherlands, where he lived for some time on the tiny island of Rottumeroog, and in Germany near Hamburg where he died.

== Birth and origins ==
Donough was born in 1668 at Blarney, Ireland. He was the only son of Callaghan MacCarty and his wife Elizabeth Fitzgerald. His father was the 3rd Earl of Clancarty. His father's family, the MacCarthys of Muskerry descended from the kings of Desmond. Donough's mother was from the FitzGerald dynasty, an Old English family. She was a daughter of George FitzGerald, 16th Earl of Kildare, and Lady Joan Boyle. Both parents were Protestant, but his father had originally been Catholic. His parents had married before 1641. He was an only son but had three sisters, who are listed in his father's article.

Family tree

Donough MacCarty with wife, parents, and other selected relatives. (Note: This family tree is based on a two graphic trees and on written genealogies of the Earls of Clancarty, and the MacCarthy of Muskerry family. Also see the list of children in the text.)

Donough; 1st Earl; Clancarty; 1594–1665	Eleanor; Butler; 1612–1682
Charles; Viscount; Muskerry c. 1633 – 1665 d.v.p.*	Callaghan; 3rd Earl d. 1676	Elizabeth; FitzGerald d. 1698	Justin; Viscount; Mountcashel d. 1694
Charles; 2nd Earl; 1663– 1666	Donough; 4th Earl; 1668–1734	Elizabeth; Spencer; 1671–1704
Robert; MacCarty; 1698–1769	Elizabeth; Farnelly

Legend

XXX	Subject of the article	XXX	Earls of Clancarty

*d.v.p. = predeceased his father (decessit vita patris).

== 4th Earl ==
MacCarty, aged eight, succeeded his father in 1676 as the 4th Earl of Clancarty and inherited his father's massive Irish estates in County Cork and County Kerry. Clancarty's upbringing became a matter of high policy. His mother, one of the few protestants in the family, brought him to England and placed him under the tutelage of John Fell, Bishop of Oxford, for a Protestant education. She then remarried to Sir William Davys, the Lord Chief Justice of Ireland.

== Marriage ==
However, neither his mother nor the bishop could match the influence of his uncle Justin McCarthy, Viscount Mountcashel, who was one of the closest advisers of the Duke of York, the future James II. They convinced King Charles II to provide a royal letter, countersigned by Robert Spencer, 2nd Earl of Sunderland, then the principal Secretary of State in England, inviting Clancarty to the Palace of Whitehall for the 1684 Christmas celebrations where, with Justin's connivance, Clancarty was married to Sunderland's daughter Elizabeth Spencer (1671–1704). However, (Burke 1866) reports that they had married earlier on 30 October 1684.

They were sixteen and thirteen years old respectively. The couple soon separated and the marriage was not consummated until many years later. At that time Clancarty, his bride and his father-in-law all were Protestants. In February 1685 James II, the Catholic, succeeded to the throne. Clancarty and his father-in-law became Catholics in the summer of 1686.

== Williamite War in Ireland ==
When James II landed in Kinsale on 12 March 1689, Clancarty received him in the house he owned there. James made him a Lord of the Bed Chamber.

Clancarty then raised a regiment of foot for James II. During the Siege of Derry he marched his regiment up from Munster to Derry where he arrived on 28 June 1689. He then led a daring night attack against the Butchers Gate immediately on the evening of his arrival. The besieged were surprised and the attackers were able to come up against the gate and touch it but were eventually thrown back.

He was taken prisoner at the Siege of Cork in 1690 and held in the Tower of London. He was outlawed and attainted in Ireland by the Williamites on 11 May 1691, forfeiting his titles and losing his estates.

== With his wife in exile ==
Having been detained for three years, he escaped from the Tower of London in 1694 and fled to James II's court at the Château de Saint-Germain-en-Laye.

He returned to England in the new year 1698 and sought out his wife Elizabeth to finally begin their married life, only to be turned in to the authorities by his brother-in-law, Lord Spencer, who had been alerted by the family servants. The case raised a public furore and William III, who did not take the matter seriously, said that he had never been bothered so much over anything so trivial as the affair of "that little spark Clancarty". Months later, MacCarthy was permitted to flee to exile on the continent, accompanied by his wife. Most of his estates were appropriated by the king's main adviser, the Dutchman Hans Willem Bentinck, 1st Earl of Portland.

The couple settled down in Hamburg-Altona and Lübeck. In 1702 they were living in the 'Irish house' close to the Altona sawmill. The following year MacCarthy bought a small tavern near the fishing village of Blankenese on the northern shore of the Elbe estuary, and in 1706 he bought the island and seigneurie of Rottumeroog, in the Netherlands, where he lived with his libertine household until it was washed away by the Christmas flood of 1717. From then on, he spent the winters elsewhere, but returned to the island each summer until he sold it in 1731. In 1723 he acquired a tiny country house in Oudwoude in Friesland. The assertion that he bought the house from Archibald Campbell, 10th Earl of Argyll is not supported by contemporary documents. In 1729 the anti-Orangist statesman Evert Joost Lewe allowed him to live at Elmersma, a manor house in the village of Hoogkerk near Groningen, without paying rent.

Donough and Elizabeth had three children, two sons:

1. Robert (1698–1769), became a captain in the Royal Navy and commanded HMS Adventure
2. Justin, became an officer in the Neapolitan Army

—and a daughter:

- Charlotte, married John West, 1st Earl De La Warr

MacCarthy was a typical adventurer, crossing the Wadden Sea on his yacht and making a living by plundering shipwrecks and gathering washed-up merchandise. The authorities disapproved of his methods and suspected him of supporting the Jacobite cause. He was commonly known to the Dutch as "de malle graaf" (the crazy earl). In 1721 he visited London and was restored to his former titles, but without getting back his estates.

A carefully orchestrated story of his successful enterprises was published in 1732. It prompted the myth told to his former countrymen that he owned a large manor near Hamburg.

== Death and timeline ==
He died on 1 October 1734 at the Prahlenhof near Hamburg-St. Pauli, leaving severe debts leading to a bankruptcy sale.

Timeline
Age	Date	Event
0	1668	Born at Blarney, Ireland.
7–8	1676, 21 Nov	Father died.
15–16	1684, Dec	Married Elizabeth Spencer, daughter of Robert Spencer, 2nd Earl of Sunderland.
16–17	1685, 6 Feb	Accession of King James II, succeeding King Charles II
20–21	1689, 13 Feb	Accession of William and Mary, succeeding King James II
20–21	1689, 12 Mar	Welcomed James II at his arrival in Kinsale.
20–21	1689, 28 Jun	Tried to storm the Butchers Gate during the Siege of Derry.
25–26	1694	Escaped from the Tower and fled to France.
29–30	1698	Fetched his wife in England and went with her to Germany.
33–34	1702, 8 Mar	Accession of Queen Anne, succeeding King William III
35–36	1704	Wife died.
45–46	1714, 1 Aug	Accession of King George I, succeeding Queen Anne
58–59	1727, 11 Jun	Accession of King George II, succeeding King George I
65–66	1734, 1 Oct	Died at the Prahlenhof near Hamburg, Germany.

== Notes and references ==
=== Sources ===
- Burke, Bernard (1866). A Genealogical History of the Dormant, Abeyant, Forfeited and Extinct Peerages of the British Empire (New ed.). London: Harrison. OCLC 11501348.
- Butler, William F. T. (1925). Gleanings from Irish History. London: Longmans, Green and Co. OCLC 557681240.
- Carafano, James Jay (2004). "Maccarthy, Donough, styled fourth earl of Clancarty (1668–1734)". In Matthew, Colin; Harrison, Brian (eds.). Oxford Dictionary of National Biography. Vol. 35. New York: Oxford University Press. pp. 108–110. ISBN 0-19-861385-7.
- Cokayne, George Edward (1913). Gibbs, Vicary (ed.). The complete peerage of England, Scotland, Ireland, Great Britain and the United Kingdom, extant, extinct, or dormant. Vol. III (2nd ed.). London: St Catherine Press. OCLC 228661424. – Canonteign to Cutts (for Clancarty)
- Ehrenberg, Richard (1897). Aus der Vorzeit von Blankenese und den benachbarten Ortschaften Wedel, Deckenbuden, Nienstedten und Flottbek (in German). Hamburg: Otto Meißners Verlag. OCLC 457541794.
- Fryde, E. B.; Greenway, D. E.; Porter, S.; Roy, I., eds. (1986). Handbook of British Chronology. Royal Historical Society Guides and Handbooks, No. 2 (3rd ed.). London: Offices of the Royal Historical Society. ISBN 0-86193-106-8. – (for timeline)
- Graham, Rev. John (1829). A History of the Siege of Londonderry and Defence of Enniskillen in 1688–9 (2nd ed.). Dublin: William Curry. OCLC 19596078.
- Kenyon, John Philipps (1958). Robert Spencer Earl of Sunderland (1641–1702). Westport, Connecticut: Greenwood Press Publishers. ISBN 0-8371-8150-X.
- Lainé, P. Louis (1836). "Mac-Carthy". Archives généalogiques et historiques de la noblesse de France [Genealogical and Historical Archives of the Nobility of France] (in French). Vol. Tome cinquième. Paris: Imprimerie de Bethune et Plon. pp. 1–102. OCLC 865941166.
- Lodge, John (1789). Archdall, Mervyn (ed.). The Peerage of Ireland or, A Genealogical History of the Present Nobility of that Kingdom. Vol. I. Dublin: James Moore. OCLC 264906028. – Blood royal, dukes, earls (for Earl of Kildare)
- Macaulay, Thomas Babington (1898). The History of England from the Accession of James the Second. Vol. VI. London: Longman, Green, Longman, Roberts, & Green. – 1695 to 1702
- Moody, Theodore William; Martin, F. X.; Byrne, Francis John, eds. (1984). A New History of Ireland. Vol. IX:Maps, Genealogies, Lists. Oxford: Oxford University Press. ISBN 0-19-821745-5.
- O'Hart, John (1892). Irish Pedigrees: Or, the Origin and Stem of the Irish Nation. Vol. I (5th ed.). Dublin: James Duffy & Co. OCLC 7239210. – Irish stem
- Seccombe, Thomas (1893). "MacCarthy or MacCarty, Donough, fourth Earl of Clancarty". In Lee, Sidney (ed.). Dictionary of National Biography. Vol. XXXIV. London: Smith, Elder, & Co. pp. 436–438. OCLC 8544105.
- Speck, William Arthur (2004). "Spencer, Robert, second Earl of Sunderland". In Matthew, Colin; Harrison, Brian (eds.). Oxford Dictionary of National Biography. Vol. 51. New York: Oxford University Press. pp. 882–892. ISBN 0-19-861401-2.
- Witherow, Thomas (1879). Derry and Enniskillen in the Year 1689. London & Belfast: William Mallan & Son. OCLC 82779901.

Peerage of Ireland
Preceded by Callaghan MacCarty	Earl of Clancarty; 1st creation 1676–1691	Forfeit
