= Battle of Newtownbutler =

Battle in County Fermanagh, Ireland in 1689

Coordinates: 54.184°N 7.366°W

- Part of the Williamite War in Ireland
Date	31 July 1689
Location	near Newtownbutler, Ireland
Result	Williamite victory

Belligerents
Williamites	Jacobites

Commanders and leaders
William Wolseley	Mountcashel (surrendered)

Strength
2,000	5,000

Casualties and losses
Low	2,000 killed, 400 men and 40 officers captured (Williamite claim); 800–900 killed, wounded and missing (modern estimate)

The Battle of Newtownbutler took place near Enniskillen in County Fermanagh, Ireland, in 1689 and was part of the Williamite War in Ireland between the forces of William III and Mary II and those of King James II.

== War in Western Ulster ==
In Enniskillen, armed Williamite civilians drawn from the local Protestant population organised a formidable irregular military force. The armed civilians of Enniskillen ignored an order from Robert Lundy that they should fall back to Derry and instead launched guerrilla attacks against the Jacobites. Operating with Enniskillen as a base, they carried out raids against the Jacobite forces in Connacht and Ulster, plundering Trillick, burning Augher Castle, and raiding Clones.

A Jacobite army of about 3,000 men, led by the 1st Viscount Mountcashel (in the Jacobite peerage), advanced on them from Dublin. Lord Mountcashel's men consisted of three regiments of infantry and two of dragoons. The regiments included his own regiment, Mountcashel (approx. 650 men in 13 companies), The O'Brien regiment (also 13 companies of 650 men), and the Lord Bophin (Burke) regiment. He also had the dragoon regiments of Cotter and Clare, each with seven companies of about 350 dragoons. On 28 July 1689, Mountcashel's force encamped near Enniskillen and bombarded the Williamite outpost of Crom Castle to the south-east of Enniskillen. Crom (pronounced 'Crumb') Castle is almost 20 miles (32 km) from Enniskillen by road and about 5 miles (8.0 km) from Newtownbutler.

== Battle ==
Two days later, they were confronted by about 2,000 Williamite 'Inniskilliniers' under Colonel Berry, Colonel William Wolseley and Gustave Hamilton. The Jacobite dragoons under Anthony Hamilton stumbled into an ambush laid by Berry's men near Lisnaskea and were routed, taking 230 casualties. Mountcashel managed to drive off Berry's cavalry with his main force but was then faced with the bulk of the Williamite strength under Wolseley. There is some debate in the sources over troop numbers, though it is thought that Mountcashel had a large number of poorly armed conscripts. Unwisely, Mountcashel halted and drew up his men for battle about a mile south of Newtownbutler.

Williamite histories claim that many of the Jacobite troops fled as the first shots were fired; that up to 1,500 of them were hacked down or drowned in Upper Lough Erne when pursued by the Williamite cavalry; that of 500 men who tried to swim across the Lough, only one survived; and that about 400 Jacobite officers, along with Lord Mountcashel, the Jacobite commander, were captured and later exchanged for Williamite prisoners, with the other Jacobites being killed. These claims seem unlikely, for several reasons. Each Irish regiment included approximately 40 officers; the entire force, therefore, would have included only approximately 200 officers. Many of these officers are accounted for in an October 1689 roll call, which shows approximately a 15–20% change in the officer roll call since July for the infantry regiments and 5% for the dragoons. This would total some 20–30 officers in all. Also, the Mountcashel regiment's roll call for October shows that companies which would normally have 50–60 men had around 25, which would result in a loss of approximately 300–400 men for this regiment. The Cotter and Clare dragoons who rode away from the battle did not have significant losses, based on the October 1689 roll call. Assuming the other two infantry regiments suffered similar losses would give a total loss of 1,200–1,300. Given their officers are recorded in the October roll and show fewer losses than the Mountcashel regiment among officers, there may have been fewer losses in the ranks as well. The Williamite histories acknowledge that they captured approximately 400, including men who were later sent to Derry, which would indicate a total loss of killed, wounded, and missing of 800–900, and likely less. This number is necessarily an estimate based on the available data but should be contrasted with Williamite claims that they killed and drowned 2,000. It appears likely that a couple of hundred men from Mountcashel's regiment may have fled into the bogs toward Lough Erne, and some of them who made it to the river tried to swim and were drowned, leading to the story of the hundreds drowned.

Lord Mountcashel was wounded by a bullet and narrowly avoided being killed. He later escaped from Enniskillen and returned to lead the Irish Brigade in the French army. The Jacobite colonel Sir Thomas Newcomen, 5th Baronet, was killed.

The Williamite victory at Newtownbutler ensured that a landing by the Duke of Schomberg in County Down in August 1689 was unopposed.

The battle is still commemorated by the Orange Order in Ulster and is mentioned in the traditional unionist song, "The Sash".

The battle is significant in another way: the regiments on both sides went on to have long and famous histories. On the Williamite side, the Innsikilling Regiment (27th Foot), and on the Jacobite side, the Clare and Mountcashel/Lee/Bulkeley regiments of the Irish Brigade. The two Irish regiments would face off again at the Battle of Fontenoy in 1745, where the Irish Brigade famously drove the British army from the battlefield with a charge in the final stage of the battle.

== See also ==
- 27th (Inniskilling) Regiment of Foot

== Sources ==
- Kevin Haddick Flynn, Sarsfield and the Jacobites, Mercier, London 2003, ISBN 1-85635-408-3.
