= Robert MacCarty, Viscount Muskerry =

Newfoundland colonial leader (1698–1769)

Captain The Right Honourable The Viscount Muskerry
- Born: 1698
- Died: 19 September 1769 (aged 70–71); Boulogne, France
- Spouses: Joanna Player (1693–1759); Elizabeth Farnelly (d. 1790)
- Military career
- Allegiance: Kingdom of Great Britain
- Branch: Royal Navy
- Service years: 1713–1734
- Rank: Captain
- Commands: HMS Solebay; HMS Hampshire; HMS Adventure; HMS Romney; Newfoundland Command

Viceregal styles of The Viscount Muskerry
- Reference style: His Excellency
- Spoken style: Your Excellency

Robert MacCarty, Viscount Muskerry (1698 – 19 September 1769) was an Irish officer of the Royal Navy and a colonial administrator. He belonged to the MacCarthy of Muskerry dynasty.

Muskerry was the son of Donough MacCarty, 4th Earl of Clancarty, and Lady Elizabeth, daughter of Robert Spencer, 2nd Earl of Sunderland. He was educated at St Paul's School. His father was attainted in 1691 after serving in the Jacobite Irish Army of the Catholic James II, with his titles forfeited, and Muskerry was never allowed to succeed in the earldom. However, he continued to be known under his courtesy title Viscount Muskerry. From 1733 to 1734, he served as Commodore Governor of Newfoundland, becoming the first Irishman to hold this post.

In 1741 he resigned his commission in order to join the Jacobites and moved to the exiled Stuart court at Château de Saint-Germain-en-Laye. As a result, he was excepted from the Indemnity Act 1747, which pardoned many Jacobites. He was granted a pension of 1,000 livres per year by Louis XV.

Muskerry married Joanna, daughter of Henry Player, in 1722 firstly. They had no children, and she died in 1759. He married his second wife, Elizabeth Farnelly. They had one daughter. Lord Muskerry died in Boulogne, France, in September 1769.

== See also ==
- Earl of Clancarty

Political offices
Preceded by Edward Falkingham	Commodore Governor of Newfoundland; 1733–1734	Succeeded by FitzRoy Henry Lee
