= Battle of Macroom =

Battle during Cromwell's conquest of Ireland in 1650

Coordinates: 51.904354°N 8.956947°W

- Part of the Cromwellian Conquest of Ireland
Date	10 May 1650
Location	Macroom, County Cork
Result	English victory

Belligerents
Irish Confederation	Commonwealth of England

Commanders and leaders
David Roche	Roger Boyle

Strength
4,000 foot 300 horse	1,500 horse

Casualties and losses
Several hundred killed	Low

Ireland and Macroom

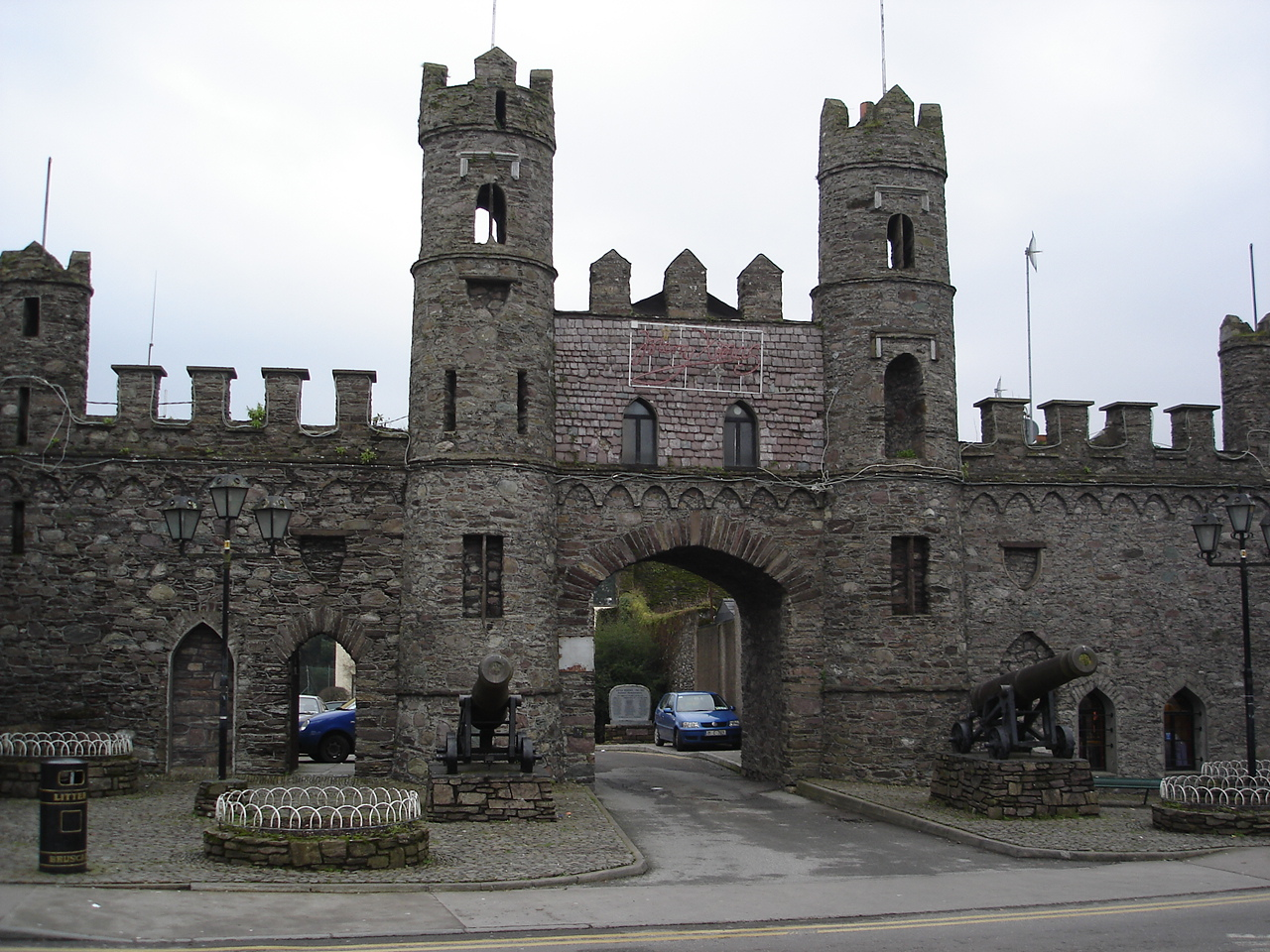
Castle Macroom

The Battle of Macroom was a skirmish fought on 10 May 1650, near Macroom, County Cork, in southern Ireland, during the Cromwellian conquest of Ireland. An English Parliamentarian force under Roger Boyle, (Lord Broghill), defeated an Irish Confederate force under David Roche.

== Background ==
Boyle had taken Cork for the English Parliamentarians by inducing its English Royalist garrison to defect to the Parliamentary side, which they had served until 1648. This was a major help to Oliver Cromwell's campaign in Ireland, as it secured for him most of Munster and its port towns. The Irish and Royalist troops in the province retreated to western County Kerry, which is a natural stronghold due to its remote and mountainous terrain.

== Battle ==
David Roche, an Irish officer, organised an offensive, out of Kerry with 1,400 men in May 1650, in an effort to relieve the Siege of Clonmel. Cromwell sent Boyle to intercept Roche's force with 1,500 infantry and 500 cavalrymen. When Roche realised that he was being pursued, he turned back. Rather than let the Irish force escape, Boyle followed them with his cavalry alone. He caught them at Macroom on 10 May. The English surprised the Irish with a cavalry charge before they could form up for battle and routed them. Several hundred Irish soldiers were killed. The Parliamentarian's losses were light. Roche's force broke up in disorder and fell back towards the mountains of Kerry.

== Aftermath ==
The following day, Boyle besieged and took Carrigadrohid castle. His men had taken Boetius MacEgan, the Catholic Bishop of Ross, prisoner and warned the garrison that they would kill him unless they surrendered. MacEgan told the garrison not to surrender and he was then hanged in view of the castle walls. The garrison surrendered shortly afterwards but was allowed to march away unmolested.
