= Charles Patrick Meehan =

Irish Catholic priest, historian, & editor (1812–1890)

Charles Patrick Meehan (12 July 1812 – 14 March 1890) was an Irish Catholic priest, historian and editor.

== Life ==
Meehan was born at 141 Great Britain Street, Dublin, on 12 July 1812. He received his early education at Ballymahon, County Longford, the native place of his parents. In 1828 he went to the Irish Catholic College, Rome, where he studied until he was ordained a priest in 1834. Returning to Dublin in the same year Meehan was appointed to a curacy at Rathdrum, County Wicklow. After nine months he was transferred to a curacy at the parish church of Saints Michael and John, Dublin. In that position he continued till his death, on 14 March 1890.

A friend and confessor to the poet James Clarence Mangan, Meehan encouraged him to write his autobiography. Meehan was also elected a member of the Royal Irish Academy.

== Works ==
He wrote poetry for The Nation, a radical nationalist newspaper, under the pen-name 'Clericus'. He wrote signed articles for Duffy's Hibernian Magazine (1860–1865), becoming editor in 1862 when it relaunched as Duffy's Hibernian Sixpence Magazine.

From materials gathered while in Wicklow, he compiled a "History of the O'Tooles, Lords Powerscourt", published without his name and long out of print. Meehan also wrote "Tales for the Young", and translated others which he named "Flowers from Foreign Fields". He edited Thomas Davis's "Literary and Historical Essays" (1883), Mangan's "Essays and Poems" (1884), and Richard Robert Madden's "Literary Remains of the United Irishmen" (1887). He also wrote verse, which is to be found in various anthologies.

His book "The Fate and Fortunes of Hugh O'Neill, Earl of Tyrone and Rory O'Donnel, Earl of Tyrconnel; Their Flight from Ireland, and Death in Exile", was highly praised on publication. It gave a new and romantic name, "The Flight of the Earls", to an event that was known in Gaelic as, "The Departure of the Chiefs of Ulster". The Limerick Vindicator claimed, "Father Meehan .... boldly lifts the veil off those foul and treacherous deeds which fill some of the blackest pages in Ireland's disastrous history".

He also published a biography of Mangan in 1884. His other works are:

- "History of the Confederation of Kilkenny" (1846);
- "The Geraldines, their Rise, Increase and Ruin" (1847); reprinted 1878.
- translation of Alessandro Manzoni's La monaca di Monza" (1848);
- "Portrait of a Christian Bishop" (1848); biography of Francis Kirwan, Bishop of Killala, translated from the Latin of John Lynch";
- "Lives of the most eminent Painters, Sculptors, and Architects, of the Order of St. Dominic, translated from the Italian of Vincenzo Marchese" (1852);
- "Fate and Fortunes of the Earls of Tyrone and Tyrconnell" (1868);
- The Fate and Fortunes of the Earls of Tyrone (Hugh O'Neill) and Tyrconnel (Rory O'Donel), their flight from Ireland and death in exile (1 ed.). Dublin: James Duffy. 1868. OCLC 1045393976.
- Rise and Fall of the Irish Franciscan Monasteries and Memoirs of the Irish Hierarchy in the Seventeenth Century, Dublin: J. Duffy and Sons, 1877.
- "Confederation of Kilkenny"; new ed., rev. & enlarged, J. Duffy, Dublin, 1882

== Notes ==
Attribution

- This article incorporates text from a publication now in the public domain: Gilbert, John Thomas (1894). "Meehan, Charles Patrick". In Lee, Sidney (ed.). Dictionary of National Biography. Vol. 37. London: Smith, Elder & Co.
