= Charles Firth (historian) =

British historian (1857–1936)

Sir Charles Harding Firth FBA
- Born: 16 March 1857; Broom Spring House, Wilkinson Street, Ecclesall, Sheffield, England
- Died: 19 February 1936 (aged 78); Acland Hospital, Oxford, England
- Resting place: Wolvercote, Oxford
- Education: Clifton College
- Alma mater: Balliol College, Oxford
- Occupation: Historian
- Known for: Works on the English Civil War and the Commonwealth
- Title: Regius Professor of Modern History
- Term: 1904–1925
- Predecessor: Frederick York Powell
- Successor: Henry William Carless Davis

Sir Charles Harding Firth (16 March 1857 – 19 February 1936) was a British historian. He was one of the founders of the Historical Association in 1906. Esmond de Beer wrote that Firth "knew the men and women of the seventeenth century much as a man knows his friends and acquaintances, not only as characters but also in the whole moral and intellectual world in which they lived."

== Career ==
Born in Sheffield, Firth was educated at Clifton College and at Balliol College, Oxford. At university he received the Stanhope prize for an essay on Richard Wellesley, 1st Marquess Wellesley in 1877 and was a member of the exclusive Stubbs Society for high-achieving historians. He became lecturer at Pembroke College in 1887, and fellow of All Souls College in 1901. He was Ford's lecturer in English history in 1900, was elected FBA in 1903 and became Regius Professor of Modern History at Oxford in succession to Frederick York Powell in 1904. Firth's historical work was almost entirely confined to English history during the time of the English Civil War and the Commonwealth; and although he is somewhat overshadowed by S. R. Gardiner, who wrote about the same period, his books were highly regarded.

== Teaching vs scholarship ==
Firth was a great friend and ally of T. F. Tout, who was professionalising the History undergraduate programme at Manchester University, especially by introducing a key element of individual study of original sources and production of a thesis. Firth's attempts to do likewise at Oxford brought him into bitter conflict with the college fellows, who had little research expertise of their own and saw no reason why their undergraduates should be made to acquire such arcane, even artisan, skills, given their likely careers. They saw Firth as a power-seeker for the university professoriate as against the role of the colleges as proven finishing-schools for the country and empire's future establishment. Firth failed but the twentieth century saw universities go his and Tout's way.

He was elected a member of the American Antiquarian Society in 1892.

He served as president of the Royal Historical Society from 1913 to 1917.

His letters to Tout are in the latter's collection in the John Rylands Library, Manchester University.

== Major works ==
- Life of the Duke of Newcastle (1886)
- Scotland and the Commonwealth (1895)
- Scotland and the Protectorate (1899)
- Narrative of General Venables (1900)
- Oliver Cromwell and the Rule of the Puritans in England (1900)
- Cromwell's Army: A History of the English Soldier during the Civil Wars, the Commonwealth and the Protectorate (1902) (publication of Firth's Ford Lectures given at Oxford, 1900–1901)
- The standard edition of Ludlow's Memoirs (1894).

He also edited the Clarke Papers (1891–1901), and Mrs Hutchinson's Memoirs of Colonel Hutchinson (1885), and wrote an introduction to the Stuart Tracts, 1603–1693 (1903), besides contributions to the Dictionary of National Biography. In 1909 he published The Last Years of the Protectorate.

Godfrey Davies, who had been Firth's student and then his research assistant at Oxford between 1910 and 1925, edited and published Firth's posthumously published works.

== See also ==
- Historiography of the United Kingdom
- Oliver Cromwell
- Duke of Newcastle
- Edmund Ludlow
- Colonel John Hutchinson
- Robert Venables
- Sir William Clarke

Academic offices
| Preceded by William Cunningham | President of the Royal Historical Society; 1913–1917 | Succeeded by Charles Oman |
