= Ross Castle =

15th century castle in Ireland

- Caisleán an Rois (Irish)
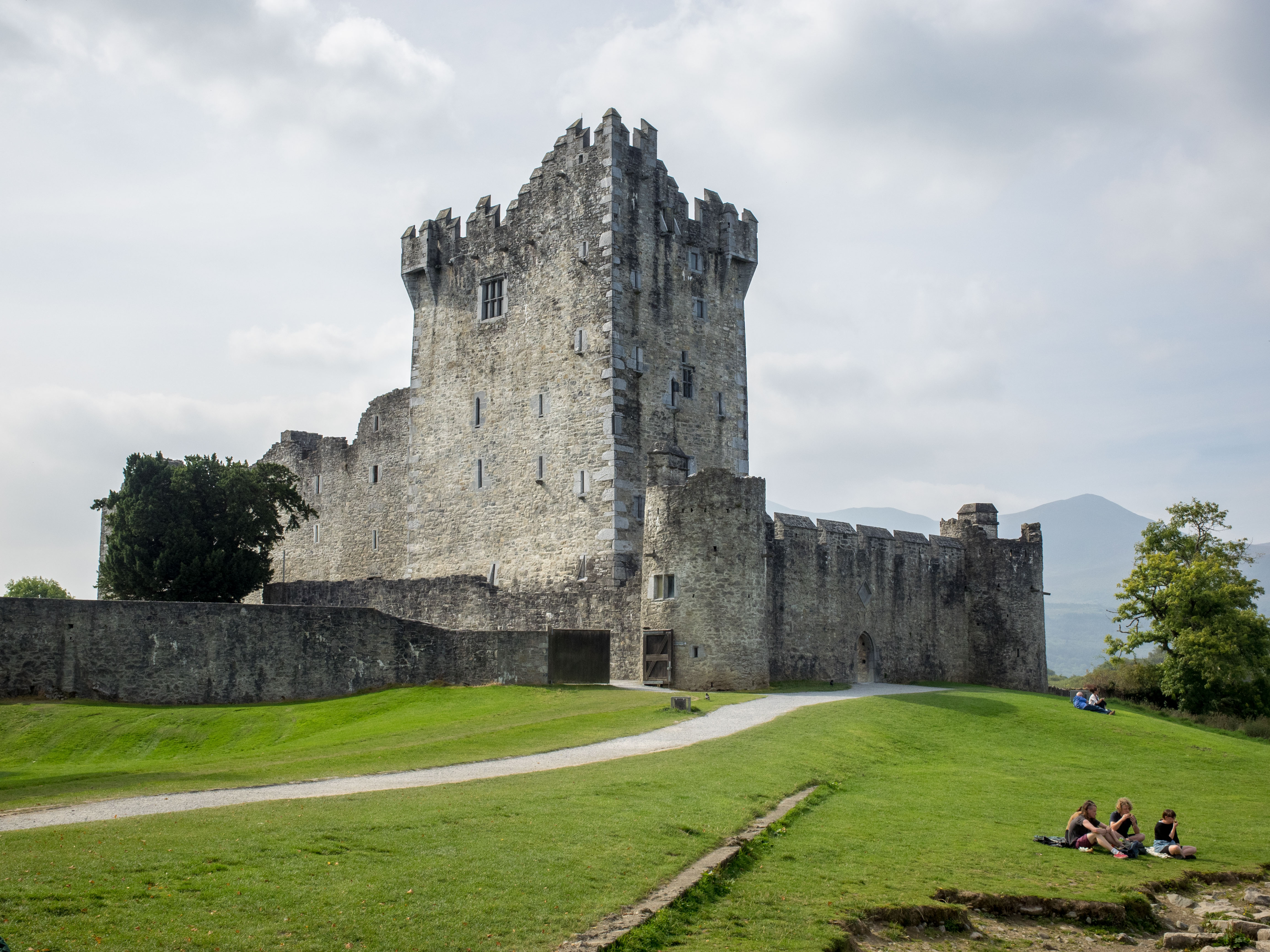
- Image of Ross Castle by Lough Leane

- Ross Castle in Ireland
- 52.041°N 9.531°W

History
- Built: 15th century
- Built for: O'Donoghue family

Site notes
- Area: Killarney, County Kerry, Ireland
- Architectural styles: Tower house and keep
- Restored: 1970-1993
- Governing body: Office of Public Works

Ross Castle (Irish: Caisleán an Rois) is a 15th-century tower house and keep on the edge of Lough Leane, in Killarney National Park, County Kerry, Ireland. It is the ancestral home of the Chiefs of the Clan O'Donoghue, later associated with the Brownes of Killarney.

The castle is operated by the Office of Public Works, and is open to the public seasonally with guided tours.

== History ==
Ross Castle was built in the late 15th century by local ruling clan the O'Donoghues Mór (Ross), though ownership changed hands during the Second Desmond Rebellion of the 1580s to the MacCarthy Mór. He then leased the castle and the lands to Sir Valentine Browne, ancestor of the Earls of Kenmare. The castle was amongst the last to surrender to Oliver Cromwell's Roundheads during the Irish Confederate Wars, and was only taken when artillery was brought by boat via the River Laune. Lord Muskerry (MacCarthy) held the castle against Edmund Ludlow who marched to Ross with 4,000 foot-soldiers and 200 horse; however, it was by water that he attacked the stronghold. The Irish had a prophecy that Ross could never be taken until a warship could swim on the lake, an unbelievable prospect.

Ross may all assault disdain
Till on Lough Lein strange ship shall sail.

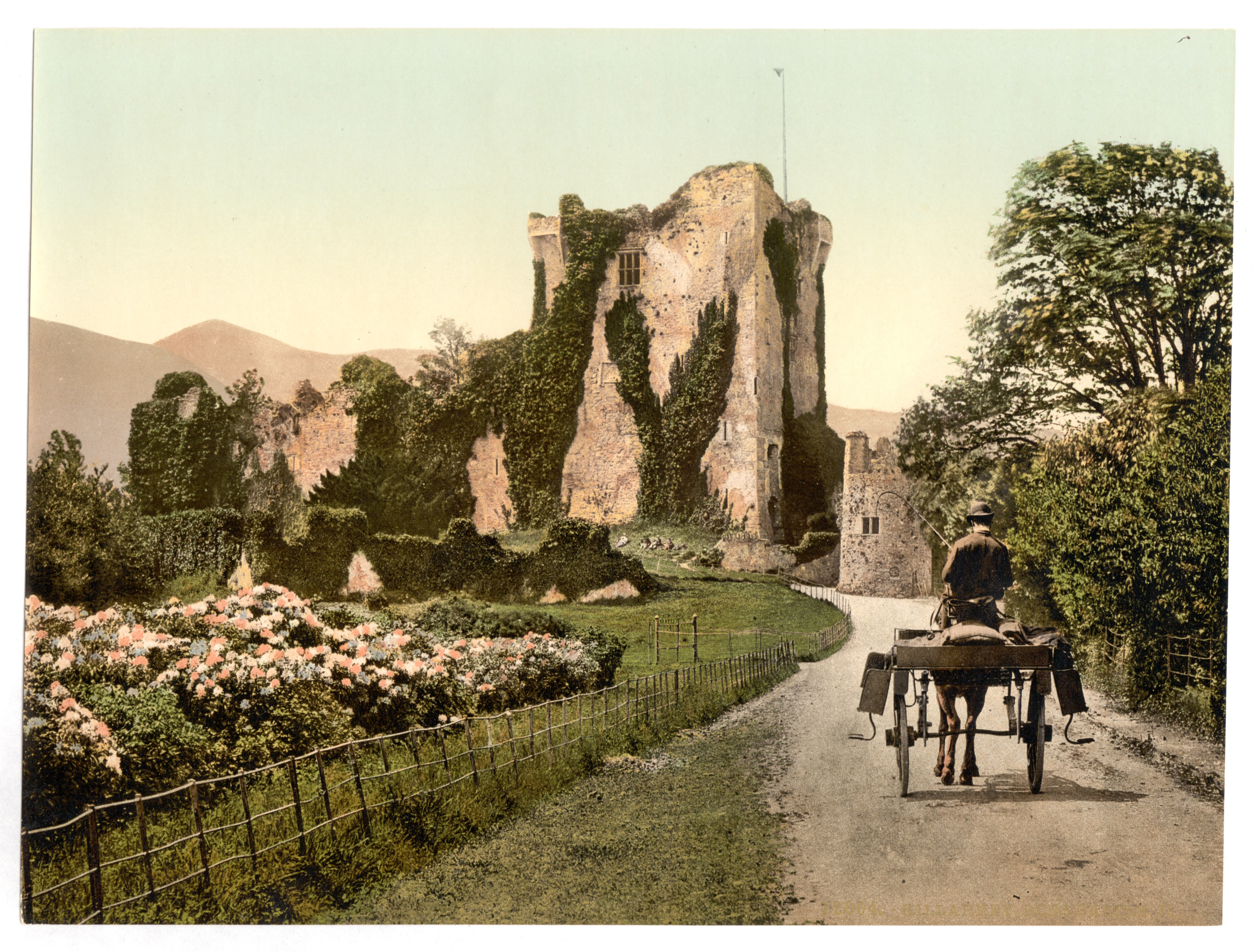
Ross Castle in the last decade of the 19th century

At the end of the wars, the Brownes were able to show that their heir was too young to have taken part in the rebellion and they retained the lands. By about 1688, they had erected a mansion house near the castle, but their adherence to King James II of England after the Glorious Revolution caused them to be exiled. The castle became a military barracks, which remained so until early in the 19th century. The Brownes did not return to live at Ross but built Kenmare House near Killarney.

There is a legend that O'Donoghue leapt or was sucked out of the window of the grand chamber at the top of the castle and disappeared into the waters of the lake along with his horse, his table and his library. It is said that O'Donoghue now lives in a great palace at the bottom of the lake where he keeps a close eye on everything that he sees.

=== Governors ===
Governors of the garrison at Ross Castle included:

- –1652: Pierce Ferriter
- Sir John Peyton, Bt (died 1675)
- c. 1679 – c. 1701: Colonel Sir John Edgeworth
- c. 1705 – c. 1714: Colonel Richard Hedges
- 1715: John Sterling
- 1721: William FitzMaurice, 2nd Earl of Kerry (died 1747)
- 1753–1762: Lieut-General John Folliot
- 1762: Sir Francis Lumm, 1st Baronet (died 1797) (High Sheriff of King's County, 1755)
- –1801: Lieut-General Charles Eustace (1736-1801) (MP for Fethard, Wexford)
- 1801–1835: Lieut-General Sir Henry Johnson

== Defensive features ==
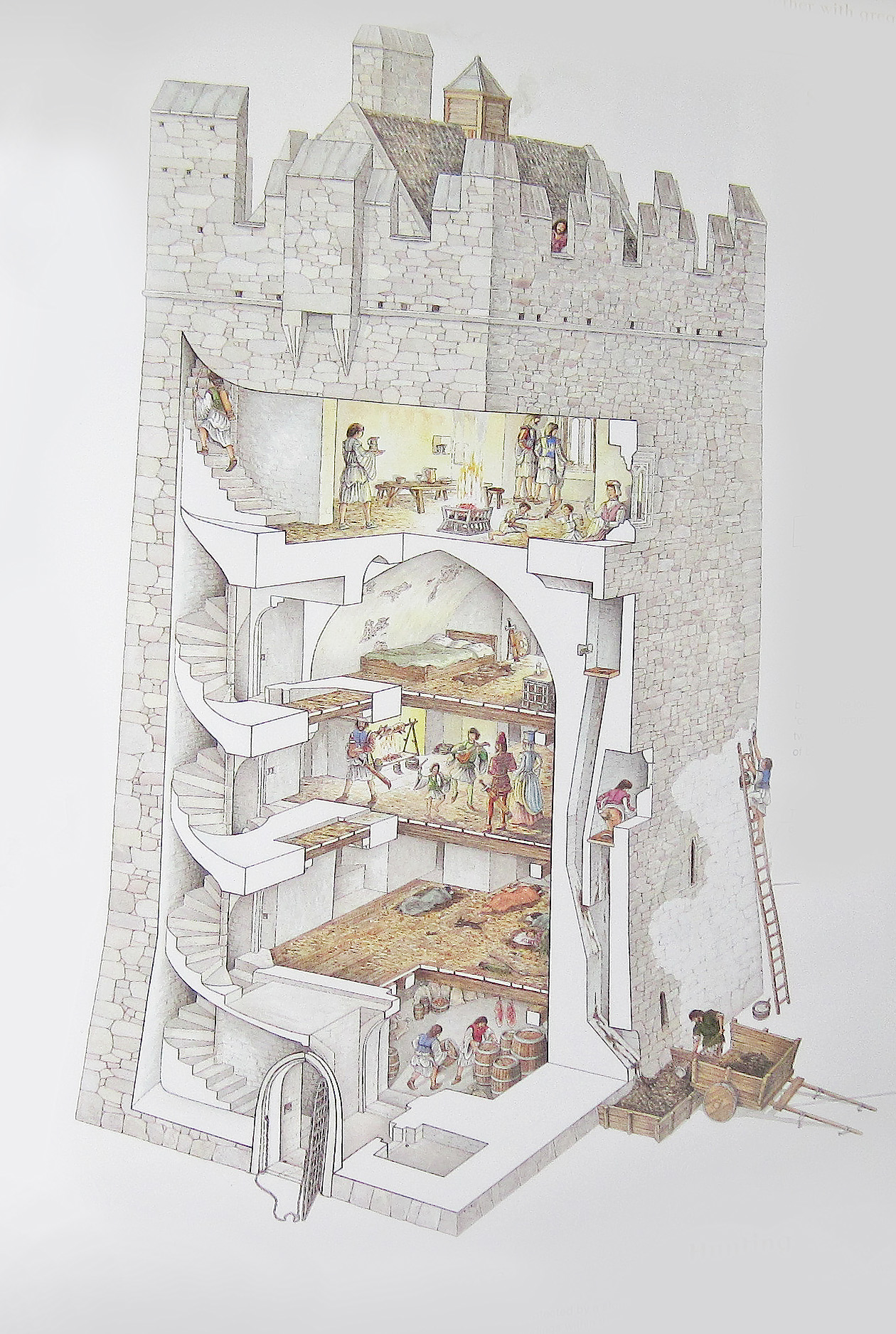
Illustration of Ross Castle inner structure

=== Basic structure ===
The castle is typical of strongholds of Irish chieftains built during the Middle Ages. The tower house had square bartizans on diagonally opposite corners and a thick end wall. The tower was originally surrounded by a square bawn defended by round corner towers on each end.

=== Front entrance ===
The front entrance was a small anteroom secured by an iron grill or 'yett' at the outer wall. The yett could be closed from the inside via a chain that could then be secured even if the front door was closed. This room provided small side access holes and a "murder-hole" above which allowed the defenders to attack anybody in the room.

The front door, on the inside of the anteroom, was constructed of two layers of thick Irish oak, one layer 90 degrees to the other with the boards riveted together. If the door was a single layer with the wood fibres going in a single direction, it would have been possible to split the door. The second cross-layer prevented that. The door opened inward and was backed by two heavy beams fitted into the stone structure.

=== Windows ===
Windows at the lower levels were vertical thin slits preventing entrance into the structure but allowing persons inside to aim and fire arrows or guns at attackers. The windows on the top levels were larger to allow in light. It was felt that attackers would not be able to scale to those heights so larger windows were safe.

=== Machicolation ===
Machicolations were stone structures at the top of the castle protruding out from the wall with a hole in the floor. There are two on Ross Castle, one over the front door and another on the back wall. The one at the front would allow defenders to drop stones or boiling oil on attackers at the front door, the only entrance to the castle.

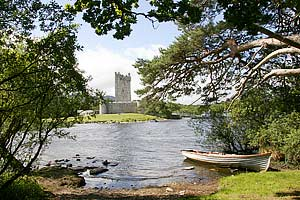
Ross Castle from Lough Leane lake

=== Parapet ===
The parapet at roof level is 'crenellated' providing ups, 'merlons' and downs, 'crenels', to allow defenders to hide behind the merlons while firing arrows or guns through the crenels.

=== Inner rooms ===
The first floor was used for storage.

The second floor was a living space for the house attendants and guards. Straw was spread on the floor to sleep on. There was typically no furniture.

The third floor was for food preparation and living and eating space for the house attendants and guards.

The fourth floor was the sleeping and living space for the chieftain and his family. The fourth floor had an arched stone roof supporting a stone floor of the fifth story as compared to the wood beam floors of the lower stories.

The fifth floor was the great room where the chieftain ate and entertained. This room was also the last sanctuary as it had a stone floor as a fire break from fire in the lower floors.

== Gallery ==
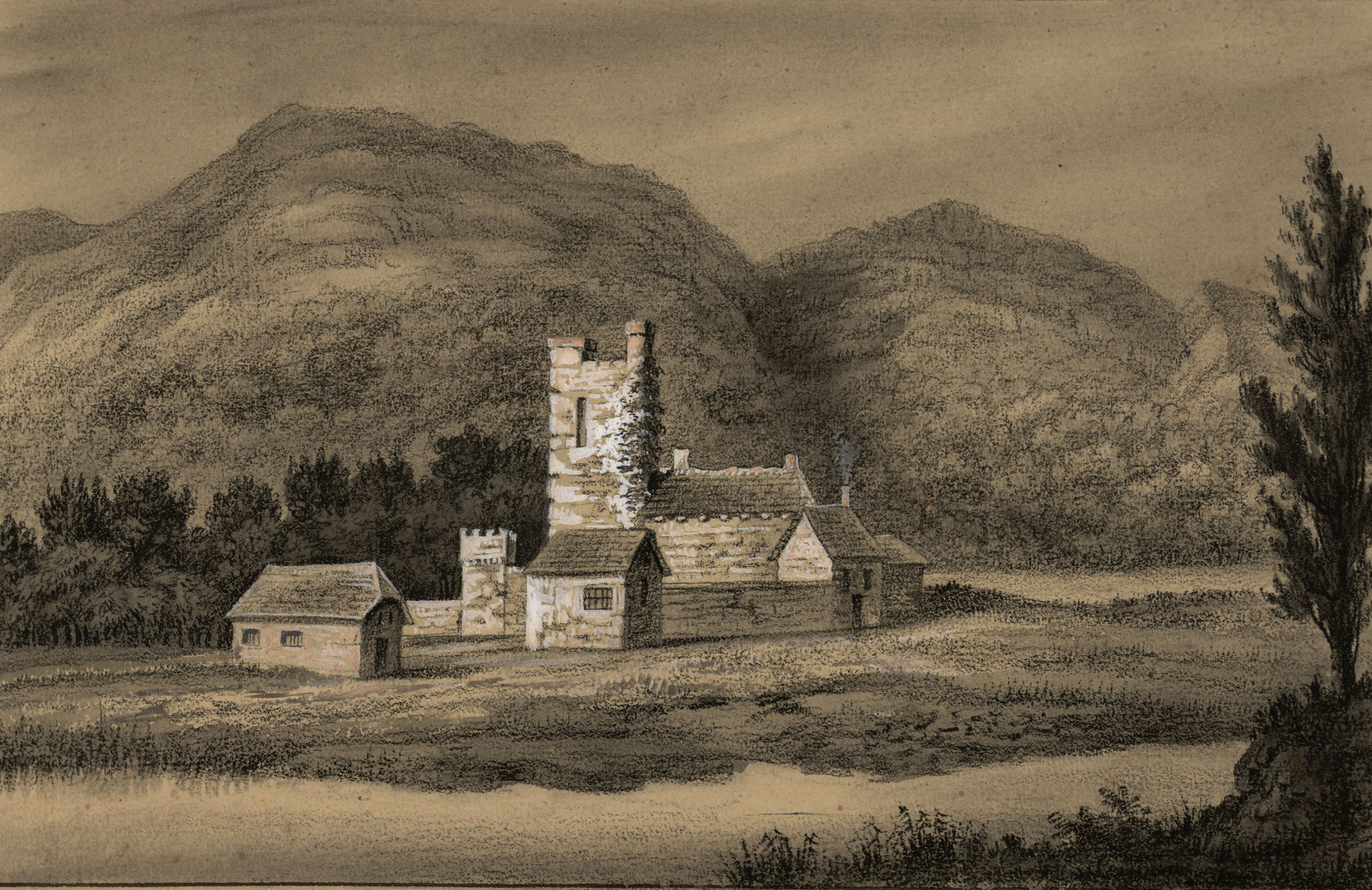
Sketch of Ross Castle, 1830

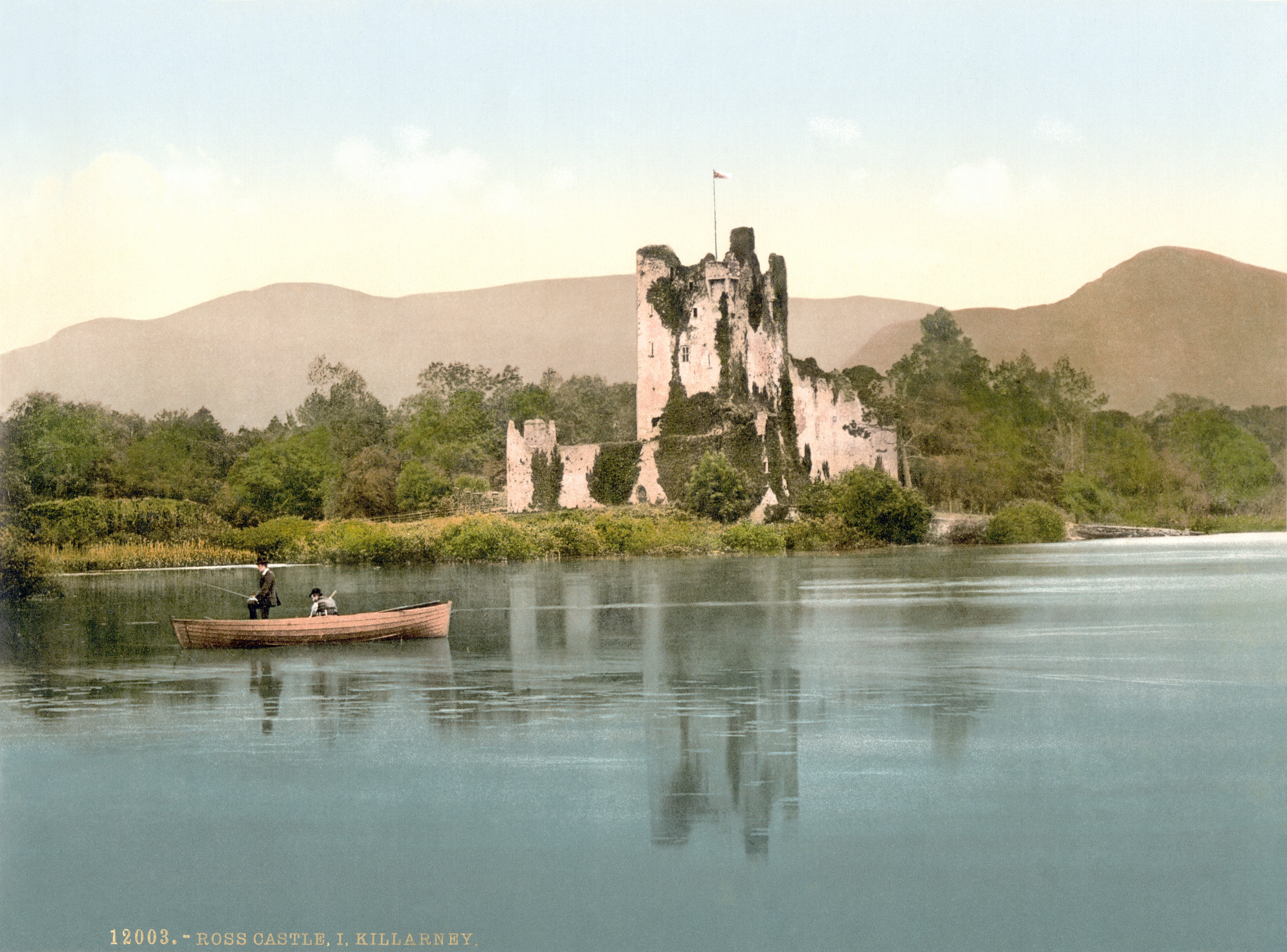
Photo of Ross Castle, circa 1900

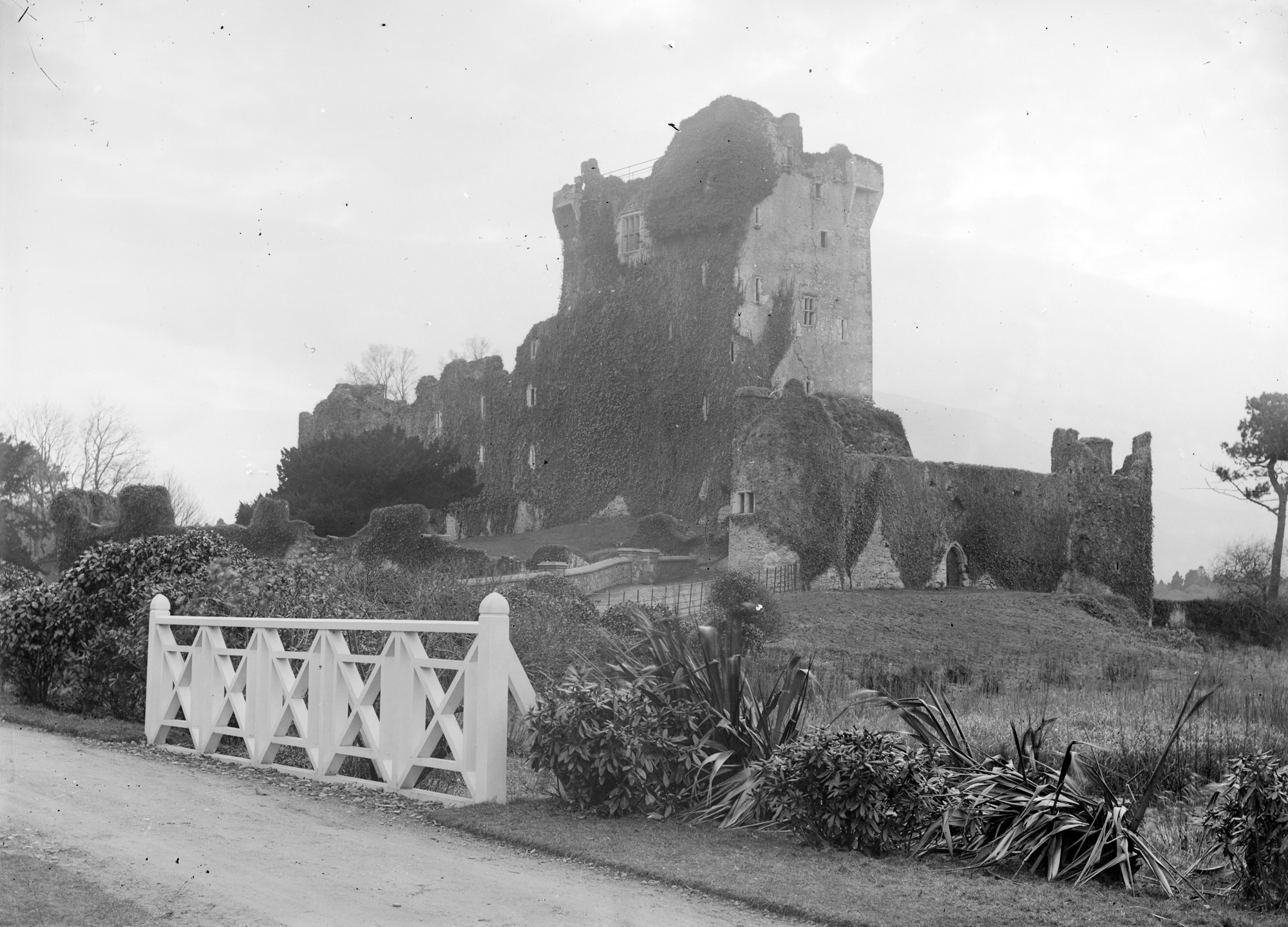
Ross Castle circa 1910

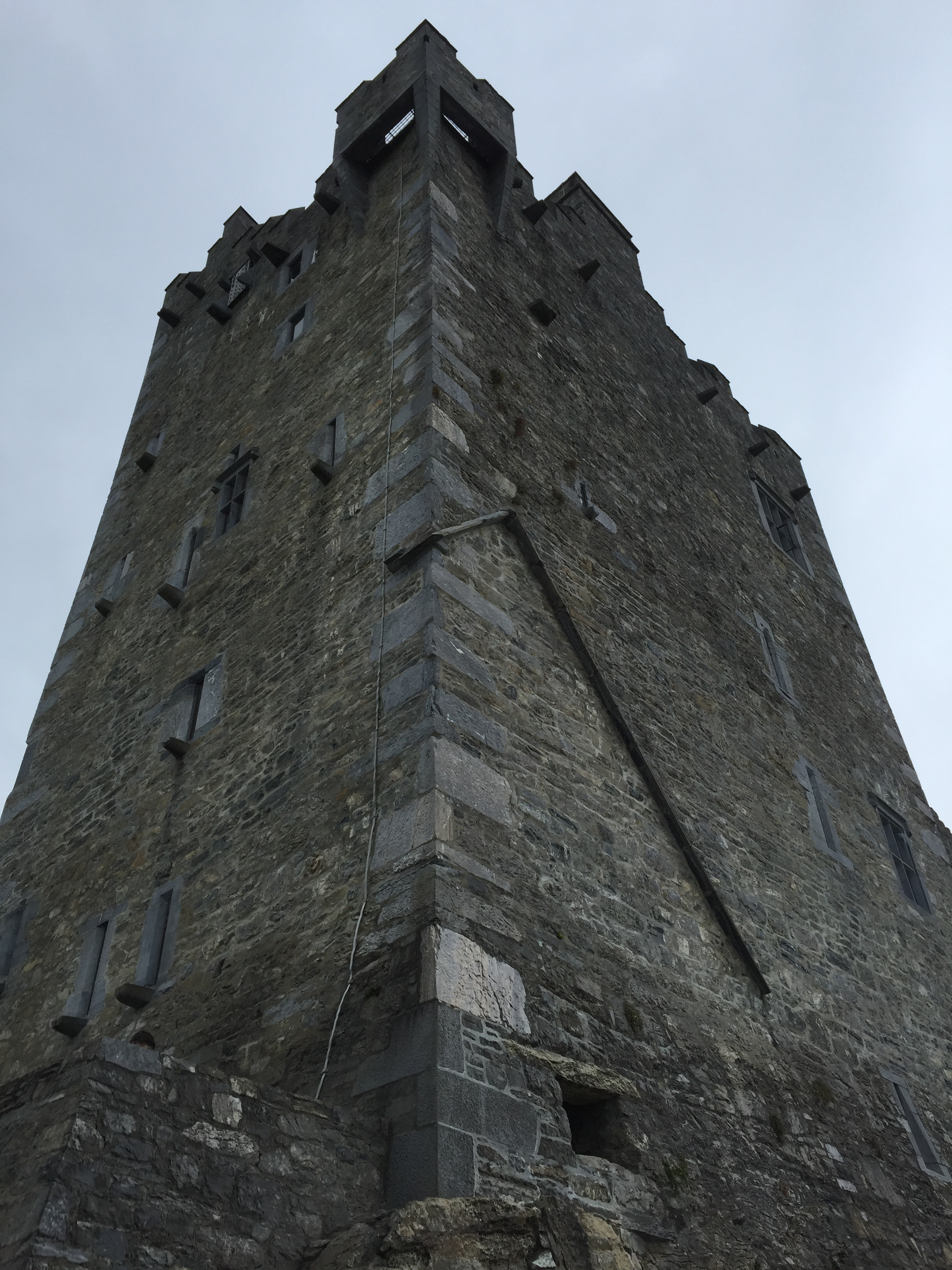
Ross Castle keep

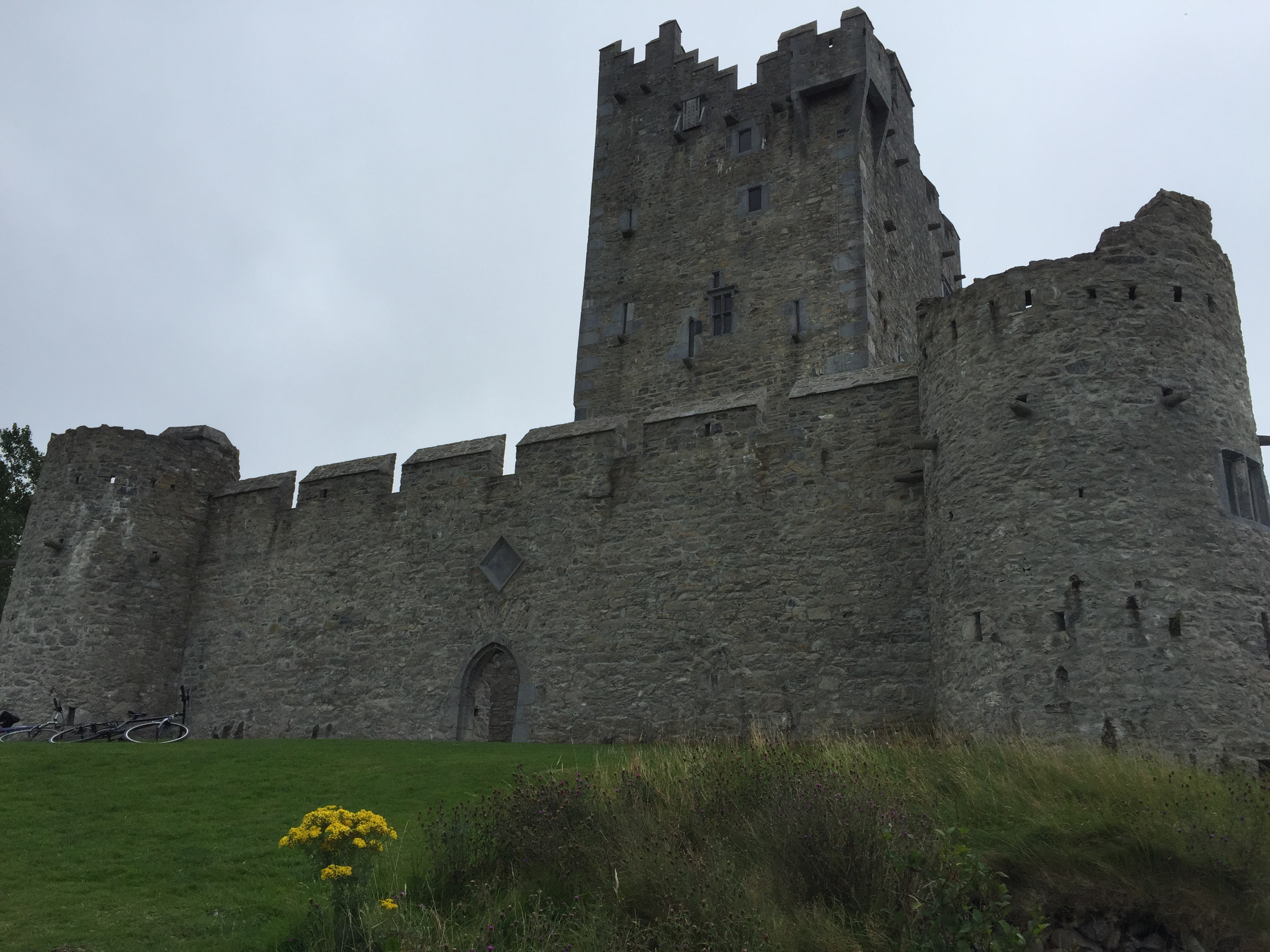
The main gate

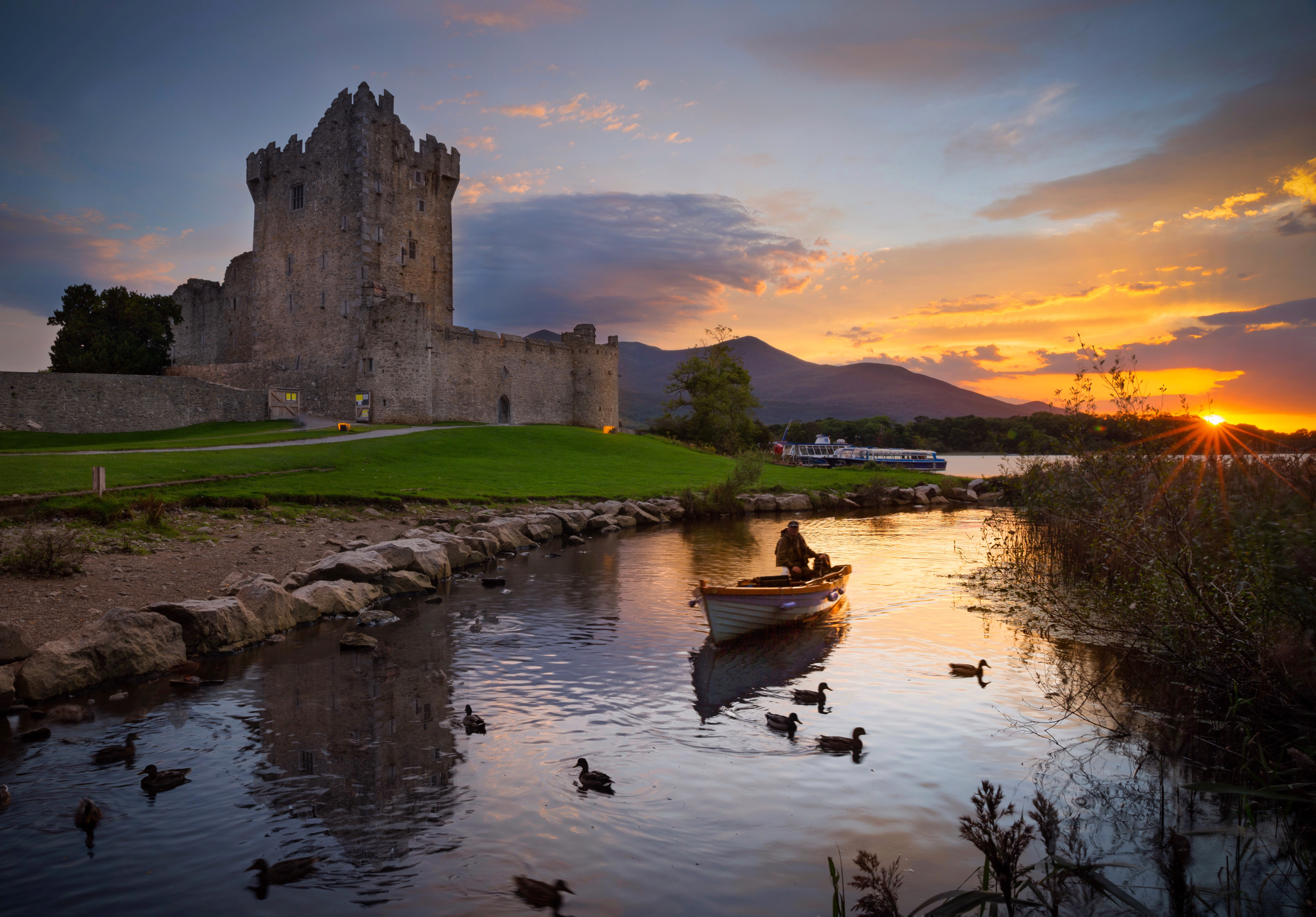
Sunset at Ross Castle

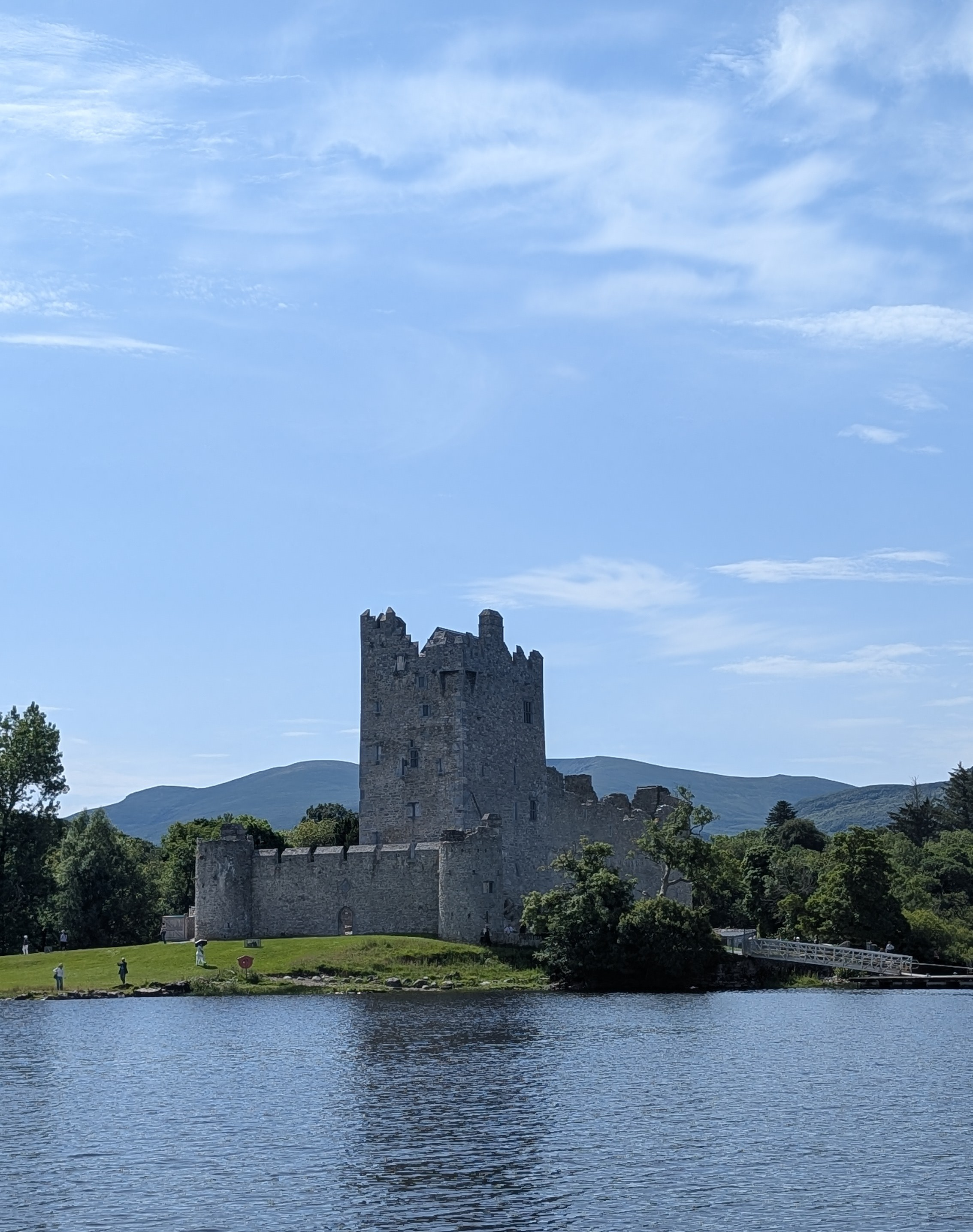
Ross Castle viewed from Loch Leane
