= James Duffy (Irish publisher) =

Irish author and publisher

James Duffy (1809 – 4 July 1871) was a prominent Irish author and publisher. Duffy's business would become one of the major publishers of Irish nationalist books, bibles, magazines, Missals and religious texts throughout the 19th and 20th centuries. He was also a major publisher of Irish fiction. He was described as having "invented a new kind of cosy family Catholicism."

== Career ==
Duffy was born in Monaghan. He was educated at a hedge school and began his business as a bookseller through purchasing Protestant bibles given to Catholics. He then traveled to Liverpool where he traded them for more valuable books. In 1830 he founded his own company, James Duffy and Sons and issued Boney's Oraculum, or Napoleon's Book of Fate, which experienced huge sales. Boney's Oraculum would later be the object of an allusion in a speech of Capt. Boyle in Seán O'Casey's 1924 play Juno and the Paycock. Another great editorial success was achieved when he collaborated with Charles Gavan Duffy (no relation) from 1843 to 1846 to publish poetry from the writers of The Nation.

By the 1860s he was employing 120 staff members at his various enterprises in Dublin. In 1860 he started Duffy's Hibernian Magazine, edited by Martin Haverty. It was a monthly, price eight pence, and ran for two years. The contributors included Charles Patrick Meehan, Julia Kavanagh, Denis Florence MacCarthy, John O'Donovan, William Carleton, Thomas D'Arcy McGee, and William John Fitzpatrick, and the articles were all signed. A second series began in 1862, renamed Duffy's Hibernian Sixpence Magazine, with Meehan as editor, which extended to six volumes and ended in June 1865. These and other relatively cheap magazines took advantage of the new-found confidence in home-grown literature and also offered an outlet for Irish authors.

Among the magazines he published were:

- Duffy's Irish Catholic Magazine (1847)
- Catholic Guardian
- Christian Family Library
- Duffy's Hibernian Magazine
- Illustrated Dublin Journal
- Duffy's Fireside Magazine: A Monthly Miscellany (November 1850 – October 1852) (price: 4d)
- Duffy's Hibernian Sixpence Magazine (ceased publication in 1864)

Duffy's magazines are seen as a forerunner of Ireland's Own today.

Among books he published were:

- The Spirit of the Nation. Ballads and Songs by the Writers of The Nation, with Original and Ancient Music (1845)
- The Poetry of Ireland. Further collections from the writers of The Nation (1845-1846)
- The Ballad Poetry of Ireland
- The Book of Irish Ballads
- an 1861 edition of the Douay Bible, a copy of which is owned by the Central Catholic Library in Dublin
- John O'Hart, Irish landed gentry: when Cromwell came to Ireland (Dublin: James Duffy & Sons, 1887)
- John O’Hanlon, Lives of the Irish Saints, Vol 6 (James Duffy and Sons, 1891)
- Gerald Griffin The Invasion (Dublin, James Duffy & Sons)

Books series he published included:

- Duffy's Cabinet Library
- Duffy's Library of Ireland
- The Orators of Ireland

== Publishing House ==
The publishing house was based at 7 Wellington Quay, Dublin, and later at 14 & 15 Wellington Quay. James Duffy and Co. Ltd. of 38 Westmoreland Street was still in business in the late 20th century.
