= Irish folk music (1950–1959) =

== Births and deaths ==
=== Births ===
- Liam O'Flynn (1950)
- Frankie Gavin (1956)

=== Deaths ===
- Johnny Doran (1907–1950)
- Elizabeth Cronin (1879–1956)

== Recordings ==
- 1954 "Cucanandy-Nandy" (Elizabeth Cronin)
- 1958 "The Rising of the Moon" (The Clancy Brothers)
- 1958 "Her Mantle So Green" (Margaret Barry)
- 1959 "The Bunch of Roses" (Seamus Ennis)
