= St Gobnait's well =

Religious complex in Ireland

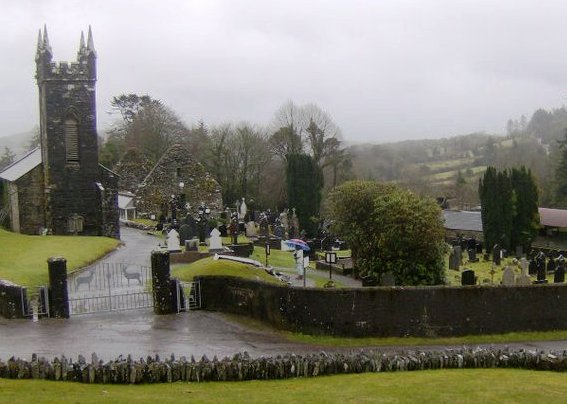
View of the churches and modern graveyard

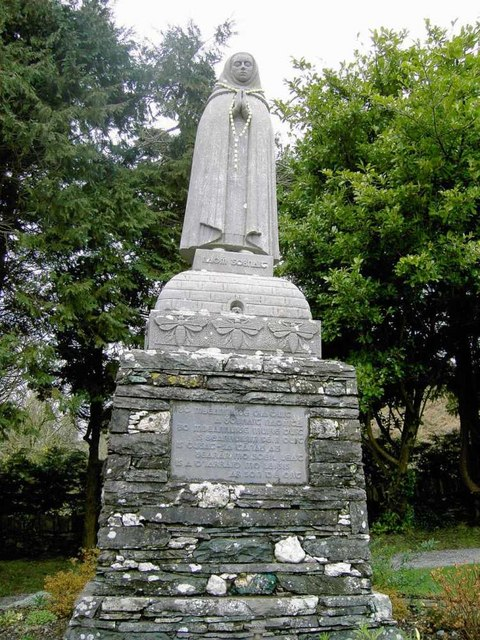
View of the 1951 Séamus Murphy statue on the site of the medieval holy well

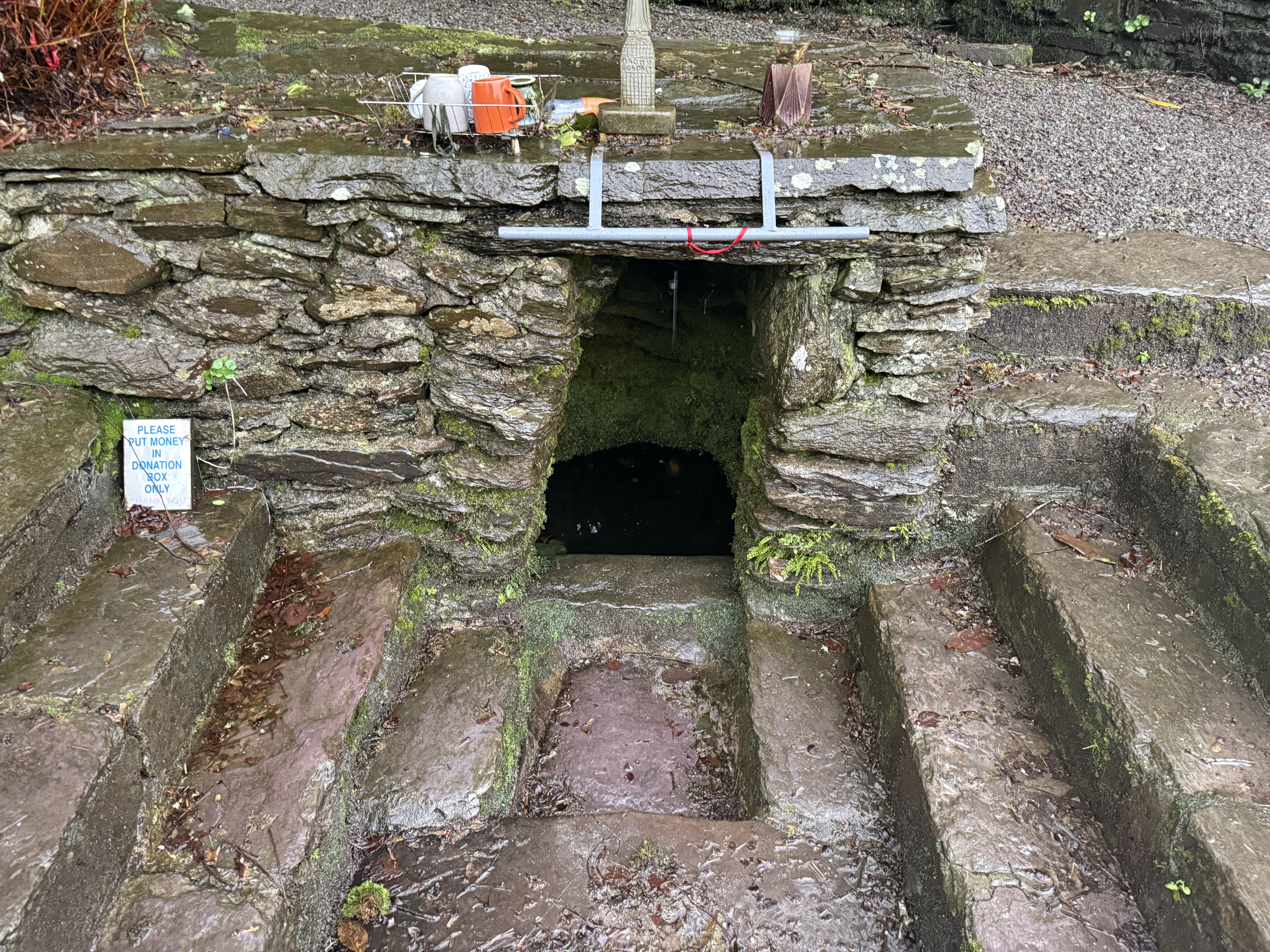
St. Gobnait's well.

St Gobnait's well is a religious complex built on the site of a 6th or 7th century nunnery near Ballyvourney, County Cork, Ireland. Consisting of a holy well, two churches and a graveyard, it dates to the Middle Ages. The site is associated with the 8th century saint Gobnait, and today it is a place of veneration and pilgrimage, where people walk around the site reciting the rosary (an act known locally as "doing the rounds in Ballyvourney", Irish: Turas Ghobnatan) to pray for the dying and dead. Eleventh February (Gobnait's feast day) and Whit Sunday are the two central dates of gathering.

Gobnait was born in the late 6th or early 7th century and became known as the patron saint of beekeepers after sending a swarm of bees to chase away cattle rustlers. The site consists of a well and a 1951 statue of Gobnait, which is separated by a road from a graveyard containing a late medieval Catholic Church (known as St Gobnait's Church, now in ruins) and a more recent Protestant church, both of which are disused. The site is a popular location for rites of the rosary, having a well defined circular path for pilgrims to walk in prayer, either in remembrance of the dead or to ask Gobnait to aid the dying.

== Background ==
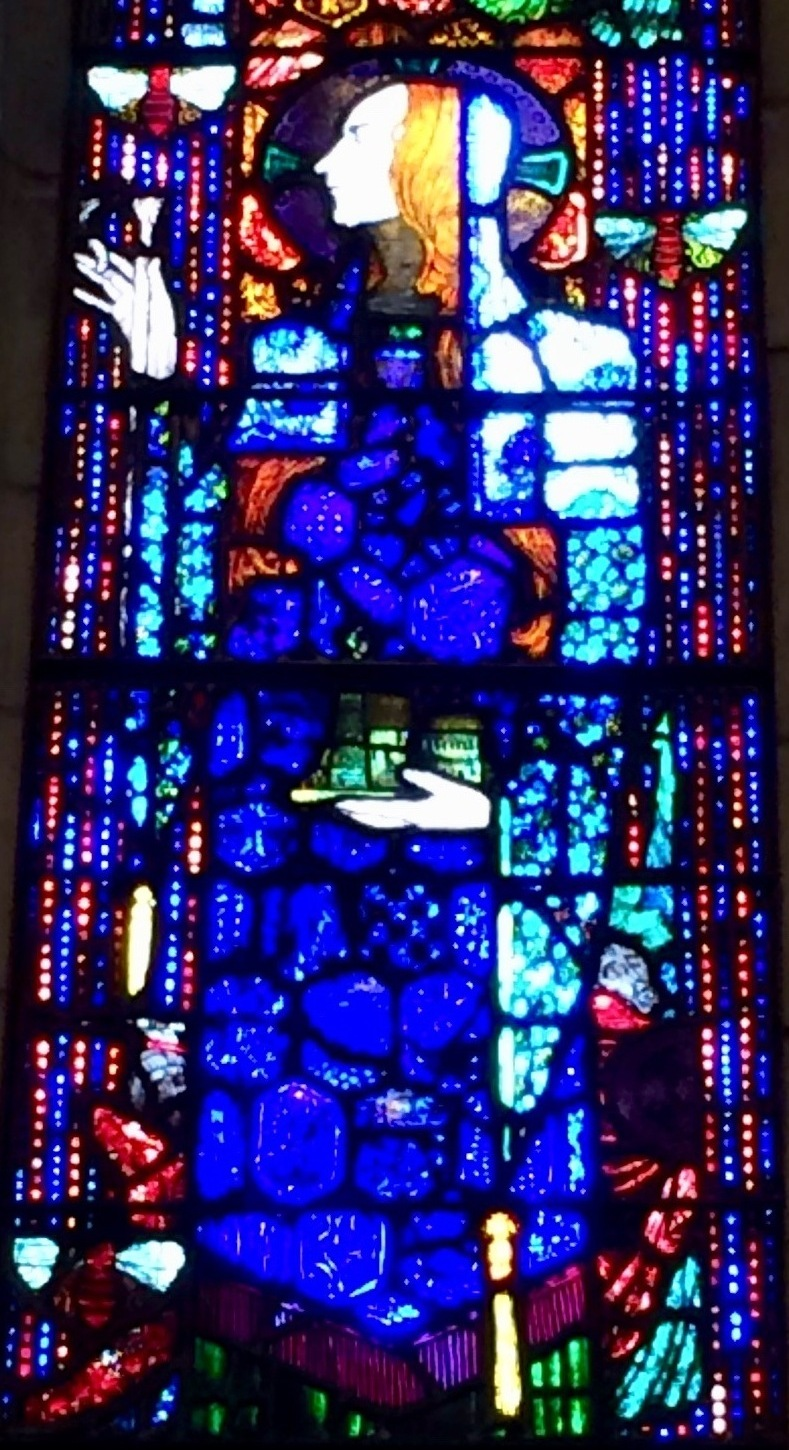
Detail of the 1914 Harry Clarke stained glass Gobnait window in the Honan Chapel, Cork City.

Gobnait was an 6th or 7th century abbess and saint who lived for a time on the island of Inisheer, where she founded a church. She became a healer and established a convent in Ballyvourney, County Cork.

Gobnait is well represented in art: her best-known portrait is Harry Clarke's 1914 stained glass window for the Honan Chapel." Another example is a small wooden statue held by the Catholic church in Ballyvourney and brought out for display once a year on 11 February, her feast day.

== Description ==
The site consists of a holy well associated with Gobnait and a modern graveyard supposedly built around Gobnait's burial mound. The graveyard is active today, with most gravestones dating from the early 20th century to the present. It is built on the grounds of a medieval Protestant church and the ruins of an older Catholic church known as St Gobnait's Abbey.

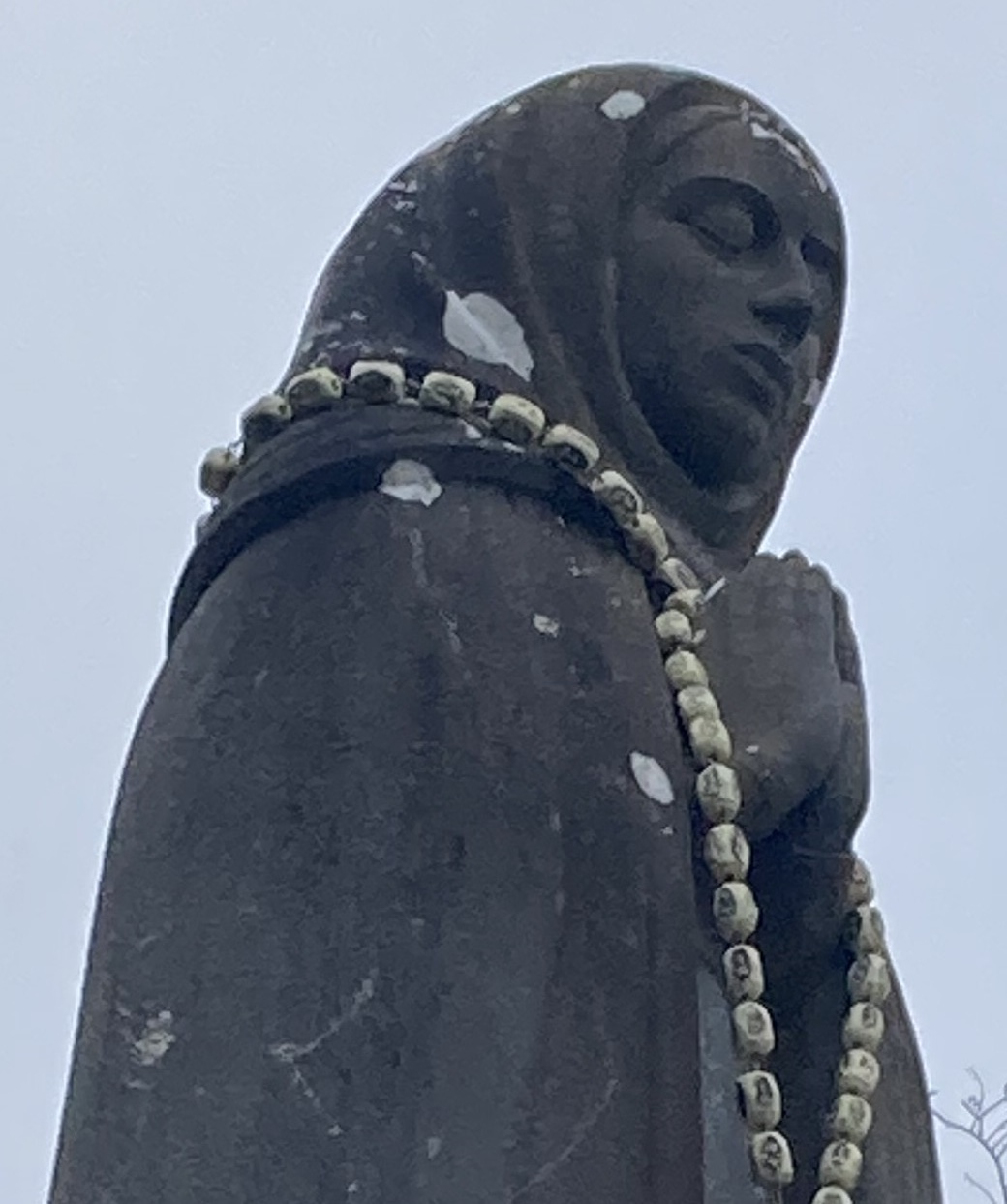
Detail of Séamus Murphy's statue

The site contains a life-sized limestone statue of Saint Gobnait commissioned by locals from the Irish sculptor Séamus Murphy. It was completed in 1951 and unveiled that year on Whit Sunday. Murphy was one of the best known Irish sculptors at the time, and his design is renowned for its "simplicity and beauty". Gobnait is shown standing on a pedestal, under which is a beehive. The sides of the pedestal are lined with carvings of bees and stags, reflecting her legend, while a set of independent rosary beads hangs from her neck.

A small, weather-damaged female figure carved from limestone on a window of the Catholic abbey was once thought to be a representation of Gobnait. It is now believed by archaeologists to be a Sheela na gig, a type of erotic/fertility stone carving sometimes placed on the walls of Romanesque churches (11th–12th centuries). By tradition, female pilgrims hoping to have a child would climb the wall to rub the figure's genitals for luck.

== Gallery ==
=== Venerated features ===
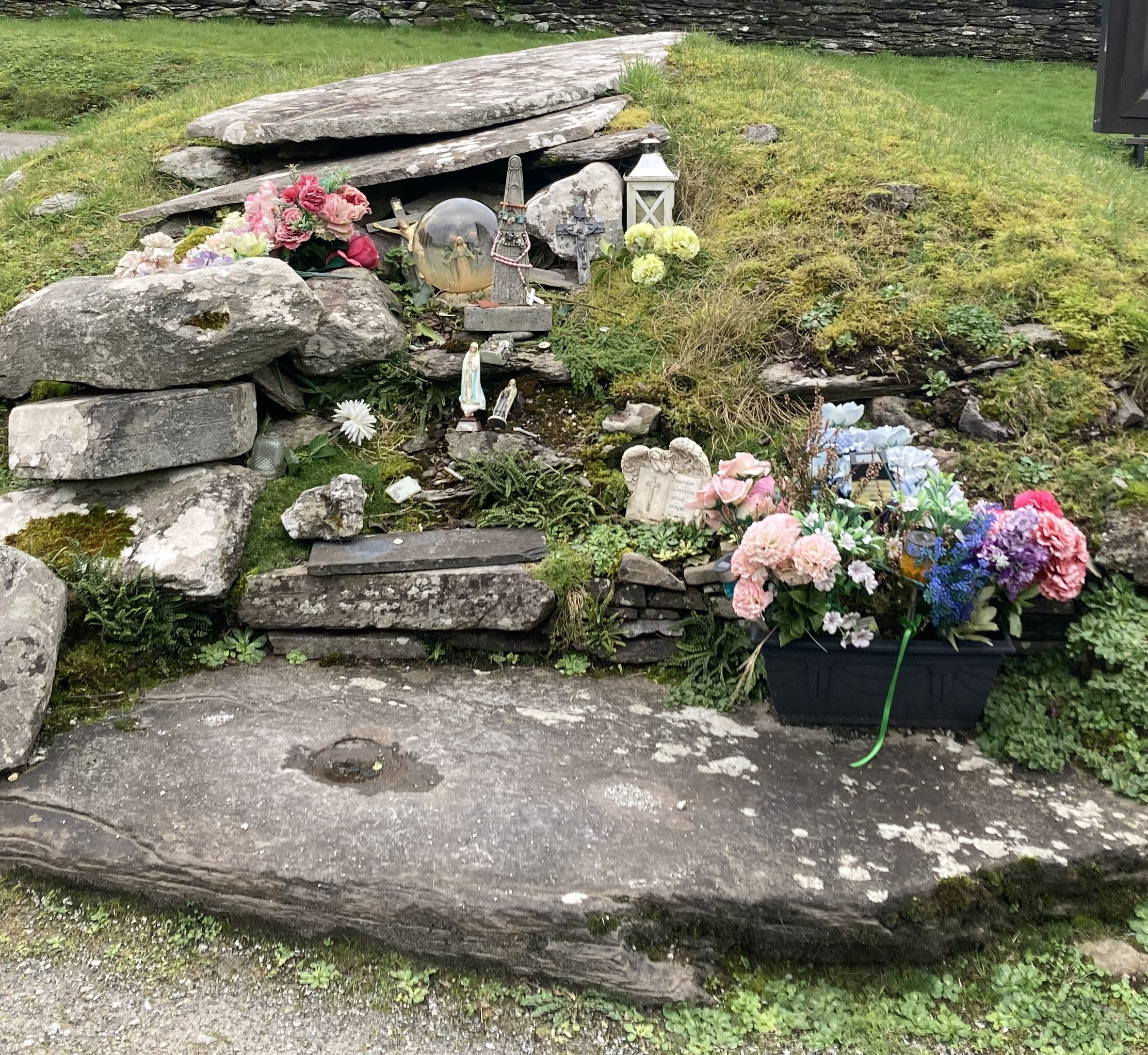
St Gobnait's supposed burial mound

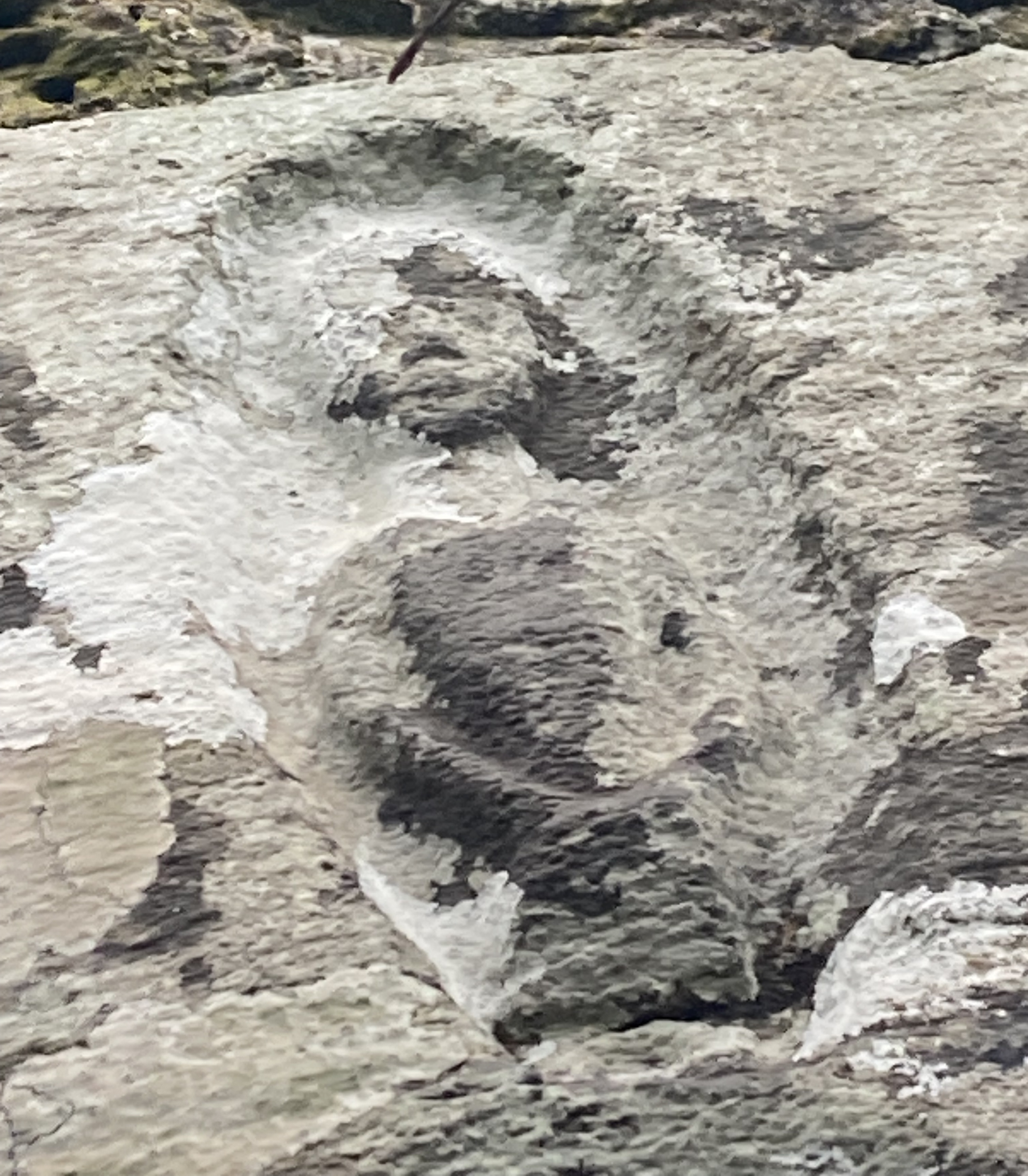
Faded Sheela na gig on an outer wall of the Catholic church

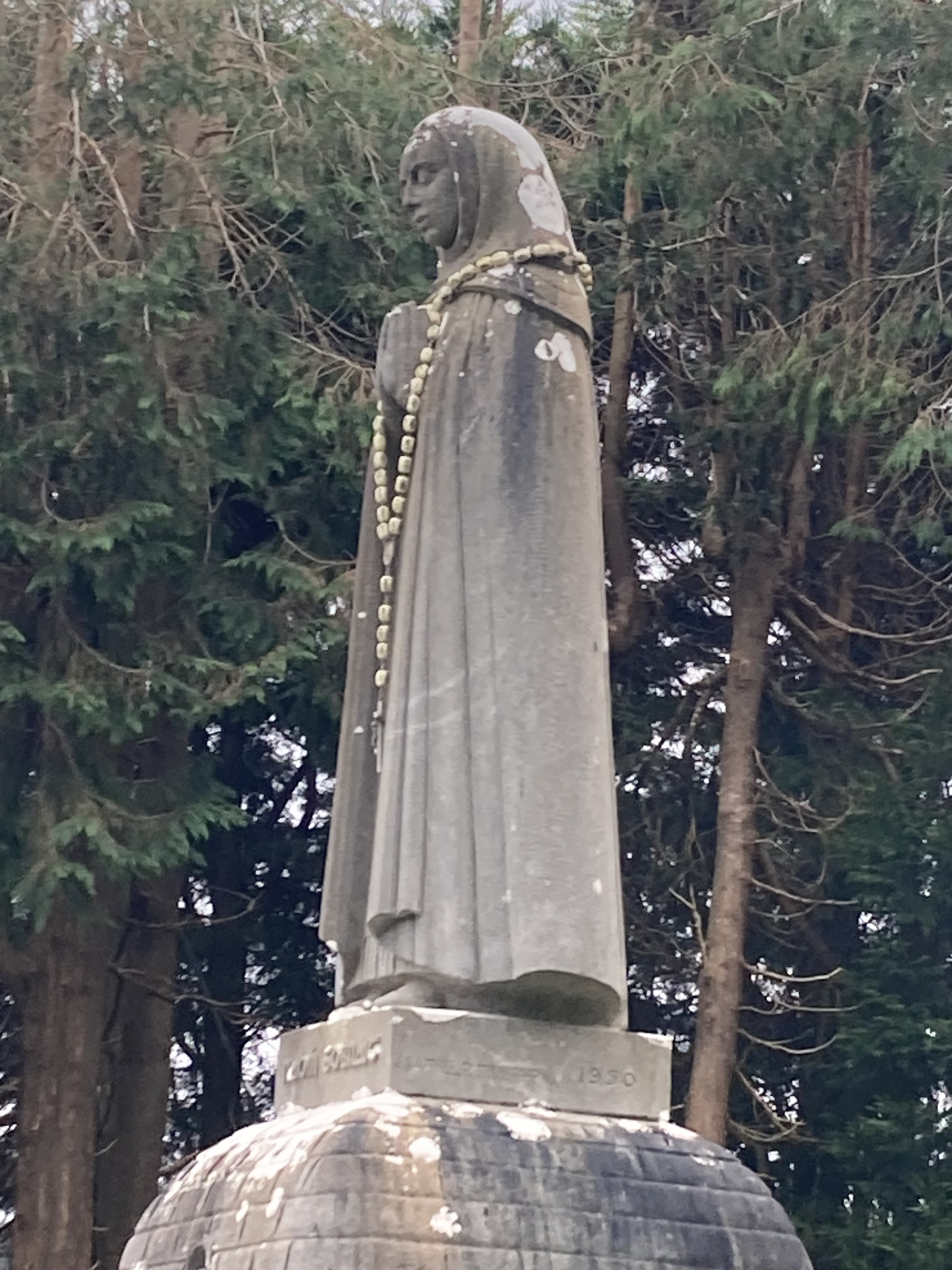
View the statue of St Gobnait

=== Modern churches and graveyard ===
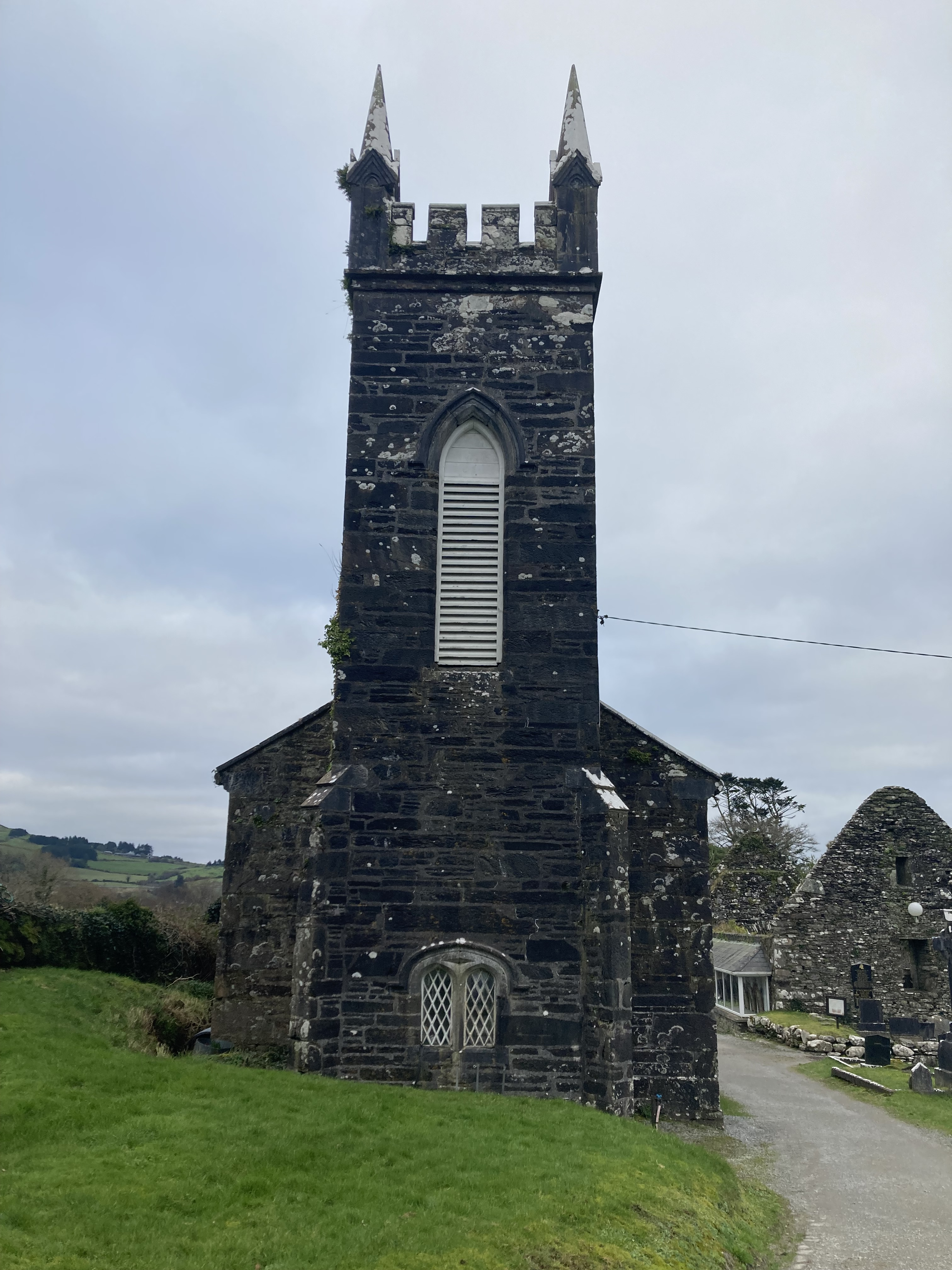
The Protestant church

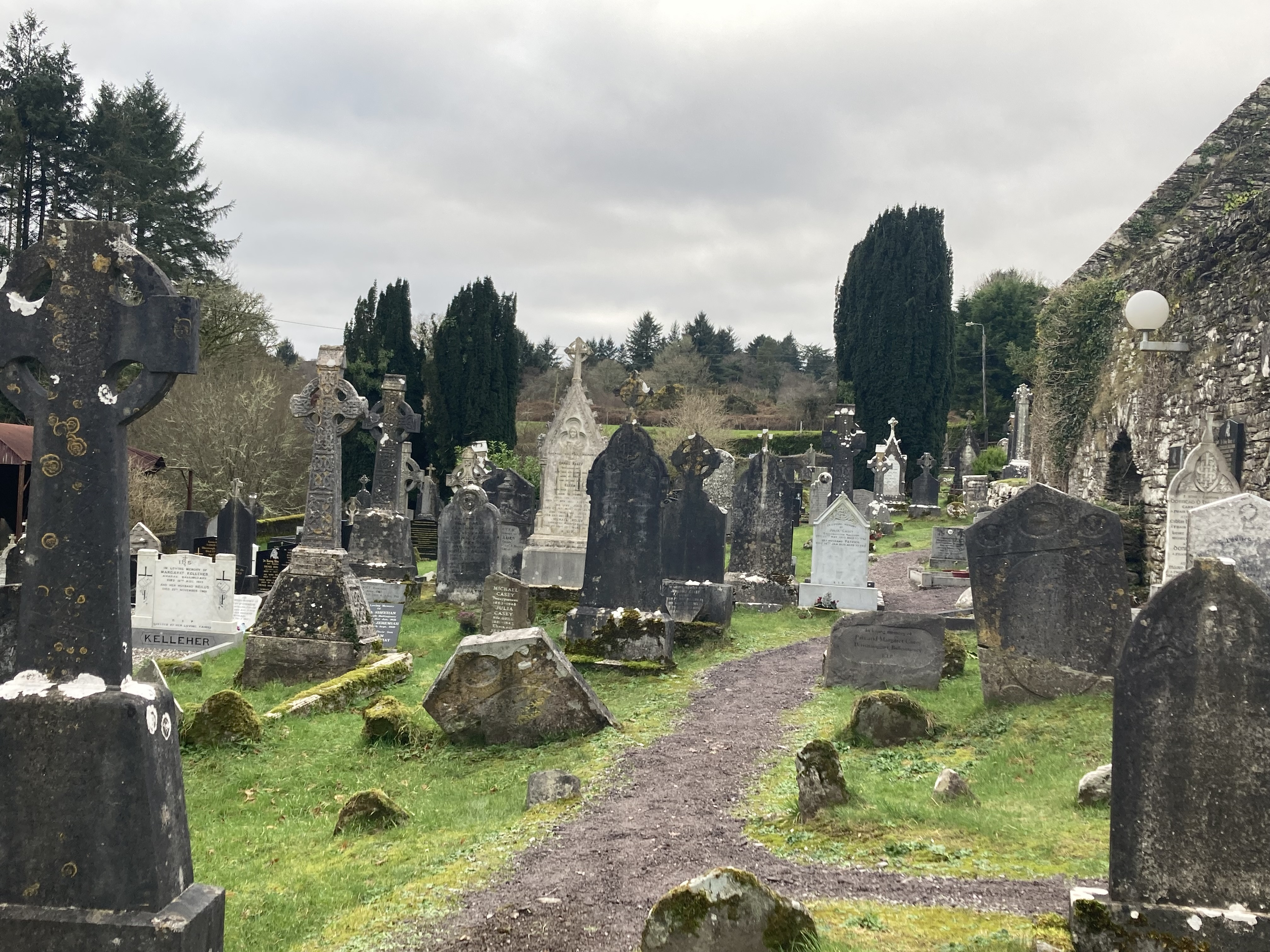
The graveyard

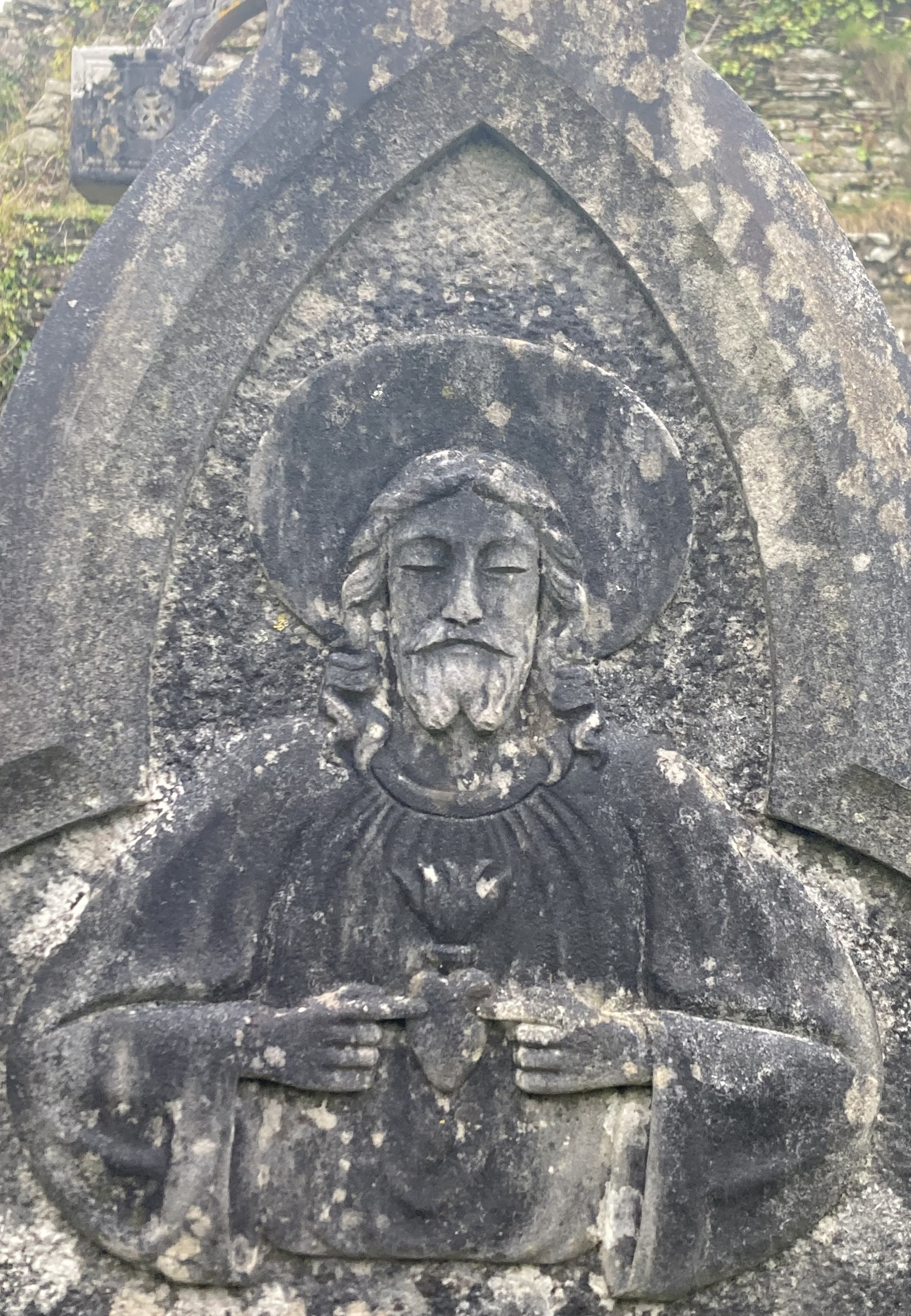
Engraving on the Protestant church

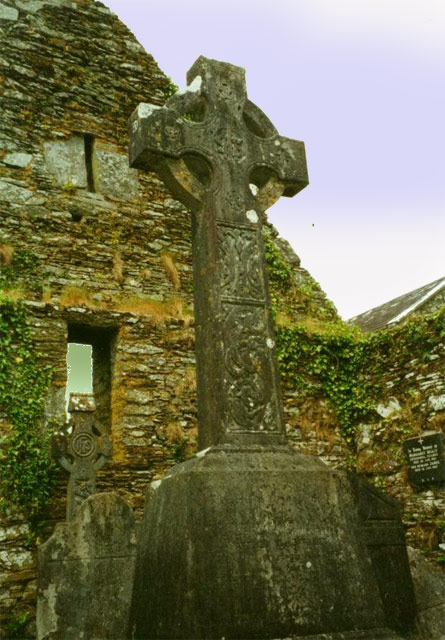
High cross in the Catholic Gobnait's Abbey.

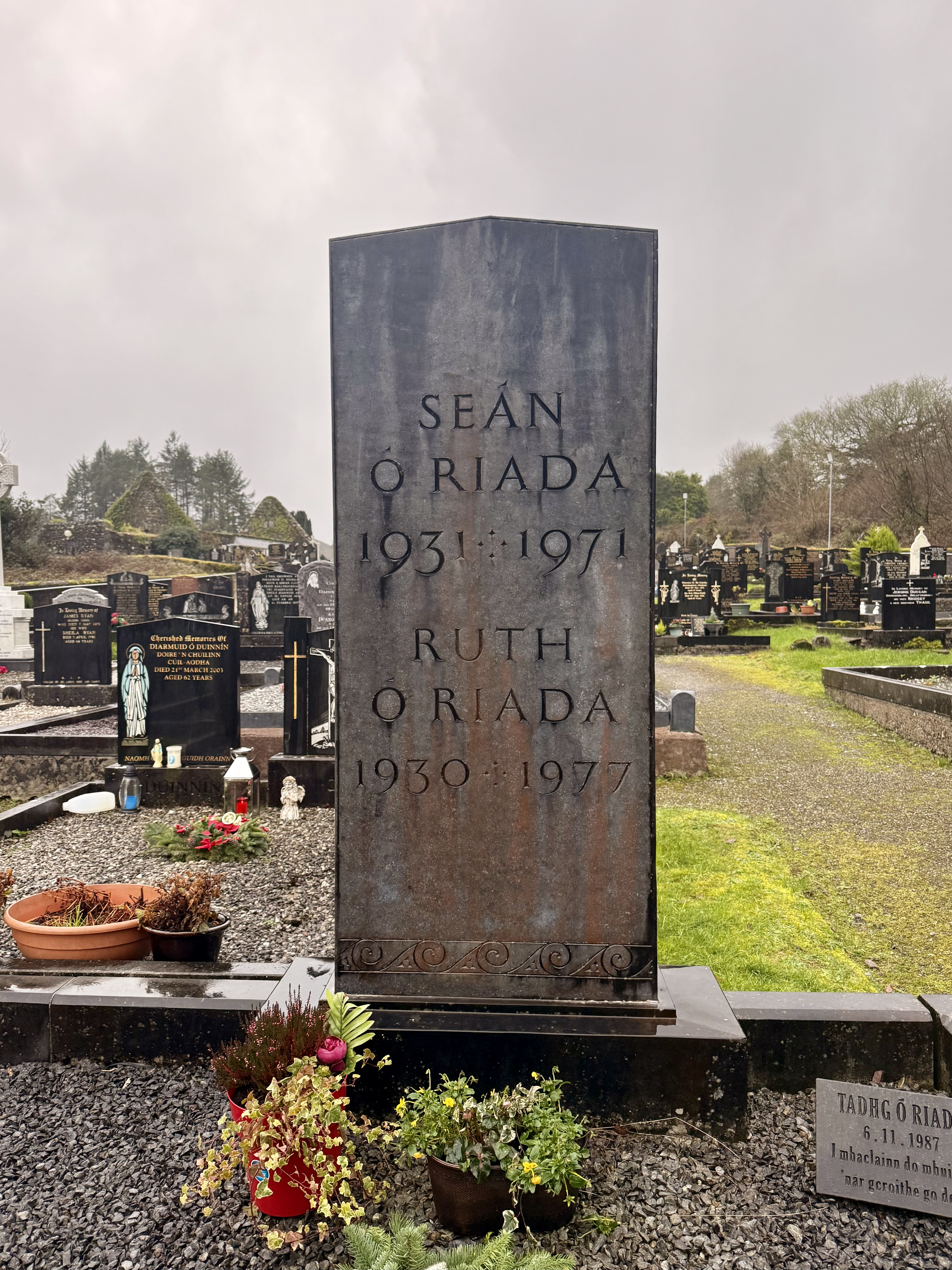
Gravestone of Seán Ó Riada.

== Sources ==
- Carol, Barron. "Holy Wells of Ireland: Sacred Realms and Popular Domains". Indiana University Press, 2023. ISBN 978-0-2530-6669-5
- Harbison, Peter. "Pilgrimage in Ireland: The Monuments and the People". Syracuse University Press, 1995. ISBN 978-0-8156-0312-2
- Hopkin, Alannah. West Cork: The People and the Place. Cork: Collins Press, 2008.
- Harris, Dorothy. "Saint Gobnet, Abbess of Ballyvourney". Journal of the Royal Society of Antiquaries of Ireland, Seventh Series, Vol. 8, No. 2, December 31, 1938. JSTOR 25510140
- O'Kelly, Michael. "St. Gobnet's House, Ballyvourney, Co. Cork". Journal of the Cork Historical and Archaeological Society, volume 57, 1952
- Ray, Celeste. "The Origins of Ireland’s Holy Wells". Archaeopress Publishing, 2014.
- Rogers, Patricia. "Bees and Butterflies: Two Drawings by Harry Clarke". Journal of Glass Studies, volume 39, 1997. JSTOR 24190174
- Teehan, Virginia; Heckett, Elizabeth. The Honan Chapel: A Golden Vision. Cork: Cork University Press, 2005. ISBN 978-1-8591-8346-5
- Ua hÉaluighthe, Diarmuid. "St. Gobnet of Ballyvourney". Journal of the Cork Historical and Archaeological Society, volume 57, 1952
- Whitty, Audrey. "St. Gobnait, the patron saint of beekeeping: Design drawings for stained glass windows by Harry Clarke. Corning Museum of Glass, 26 September 2020
- Zucchelli, Christine. Sacred Stones of Ireland. Cork: Collins Press, 2007. ISBN 978-1-8488-9726-7
