= Seán Ó Riada =

Irish composer (1931–1971)

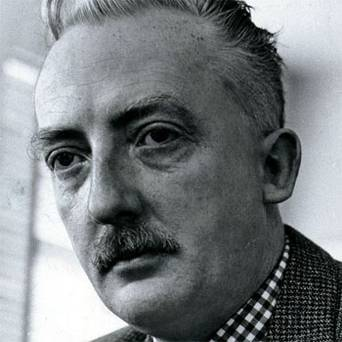

Background information
- Born: John Reidy; 1 August 1931; Cork, Ireland
- Died: 3 October 1971 (aged 40) London, England
- Occupation: Composer
- Years active: 1954–1971

Seán Ó Riada (Irish: [ˈʃaːnˠ oː ˈɾˠiəd̪ˠə]; born John Reidy; 1 August 1931 – 3 October 1971) was an Irish composer and arranger of Irish traditional music. Through his incorporation of modern and traditional techniques he became the single most influential figure in the revival of Irish traditional music during the 1960s.

Born in Cork City, Ó Riada's career began as a music director at Radio Éireann from 1954, after which he worked at the Abbey Theatre from 1955 to 1962. He lectured in music at University College Cork from 1963 until his death in 1971. He became a household name in Ireland through his participation in Ceoltóirí Chualann, compositions, writings and broadcasts. His best-known pieces in the classical tradition include Nomos No. 1: Hercules Dux Ferrariae (1957), but he became particularly famous for his film scores Mise Éire (1959) and Saoirse? (1960). He left a lasting influence as founder and director of the ensemble Ceoltóirí Chualann (from 1961). His music still endures: his mass in Irish is still sung to this day in many churches in the Irish-speaking regions of Ireland.

Ó Riada died in 1971, aged 40.

== Early life ==
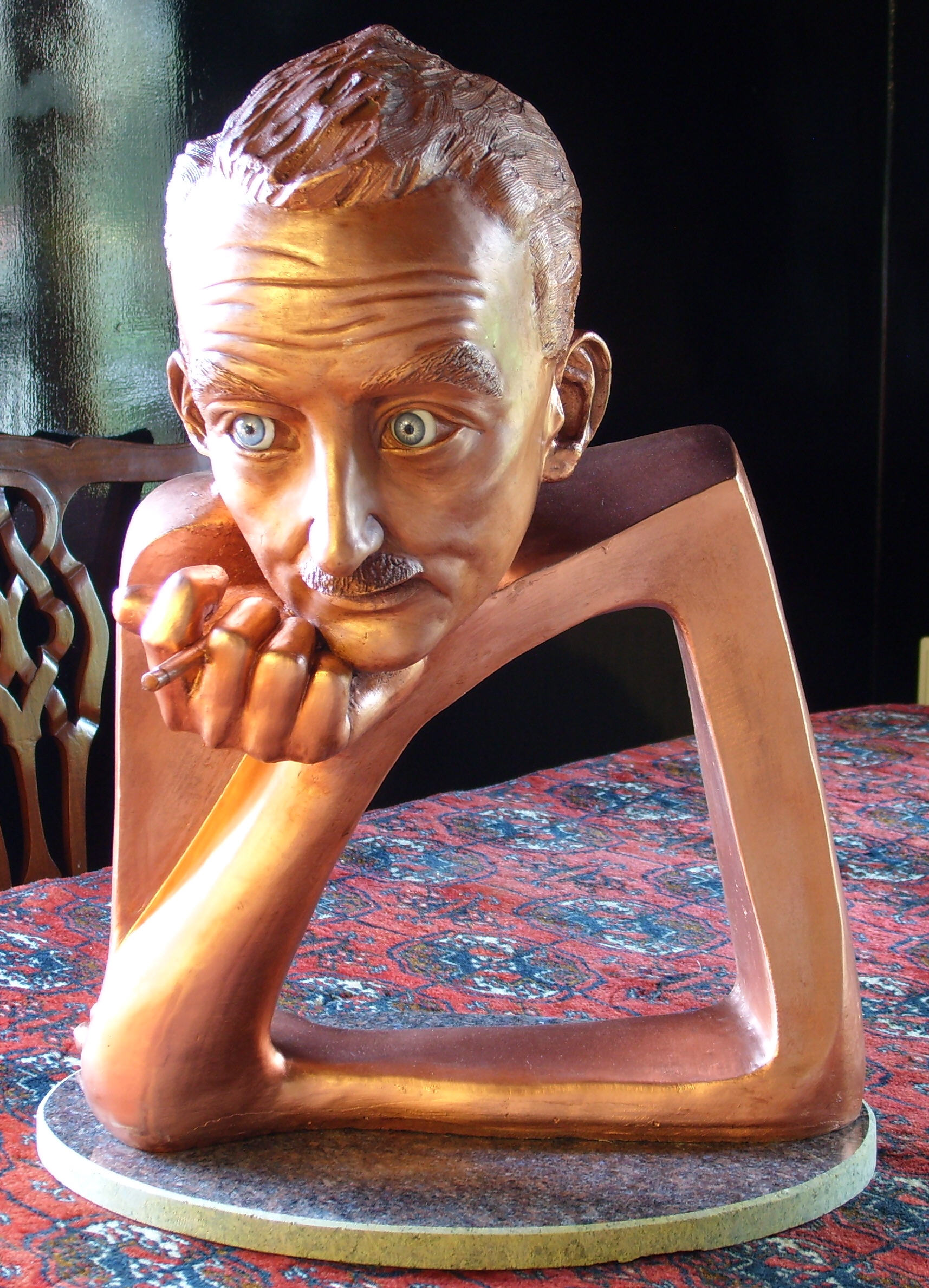
Séan Ó Riada in Copper Sculpture

Ó Riada was born John Reidy in Cork City. He spent his early years in Adare, County Limerick, where his father, a Garda sergeant, was stationed. After beginning school in Adare, he later attended St Finbarr's College, Farranferris and whilst he was there he received musical education from Aloys Fleischmann (Senior). He moved to St Munchin's College in Limerick where he completed his Leaving Certificate in 1948.

He played violin, piano and organ, and studied Greek, Latin, and Classics at University College Cork, with Aloys Fleischmann (Junior) and graduated in 1952. While at college, Ó Riada was the auditor of the UCC Philosophical Society. That year he became assistant director for Radio Éireann. He married Ruth Coughlan in 1953.

During the evening he played piano with dance bands. He spent several months in France in 1955, and consolidated his interest in modernist music. On his return in July he became music director of the Abbey Theatre, Dublin (until 1962), where he wrote, arranged and directed music for the small pit orchestra, also continuing his work in radio. Most of his original, modern orchestral compositions were also written in this time, which included his Nomos No. 1: Hercules Dux Ferrariae for string orchestra (1957), Nomos No. 4 for piano and orchestra (1958) and the Triptyche pour orchestre (1960) as well as an early version of his ambitious Nomos No. 2 for baritone solo, mixed choir and orchestra (1965). As his work with Ceoltóirí Chualann developed, his engagement with the modern musical avantgarde decreased, but was never abandoned.

== Mise Éire ==
Ó Riada composed and directed orchestral music for theatre and film, combining traditional Irish tunes and "sean-nós" (old style) songs in the classical tradition, similar to nationalist composers such as Dvořák (Czech), Bartók (Hungarian) and Ralph Vaughan Williams (English). In 1959 he scored a documentary film by George Morrison called Mise Éire ("I am Ireland"), about the founding of the Irish Republic. The recording is conducted by Ó Riada himself. Mise Éire brought him national acclaim and allowed him to start a series of programmes on Irish radio called Our Musical Heritage. Ó Riada told people that one should listen to sean-nós singing either as a child would listen or as if they were songs from India.

== Ceoltóirí Chualann ==
Between 1961 and 1969 Ó Riada led the Ceoltóirí Chualann group. They played in concert halls dressed in black suits with white shirts and black bow ties, but relied on traditional songs and tunes. An ordinary céili band or show-band would have musicians who competed with each other to grab the audience's attention. Ceoltóirí Chualann played sparse lucid arrangements. Ó Riada sat in the middle at front playing a harpsichord and a bodhrán, a hand-held frame-drum. This was an instrument that had almost died out, being played only by small boys in street parades. Ceilí bands generally had jazz-band drum-kits. Ó Riada also wanted to use the cláirseach or wire-strung harp in the band, but as these were as yet unavailable, he played the harpsichord instead – in his opinion the nearest sound to a cláirseach. The harpsichord he used on a regular basis was made by Cathal Gannon. Unknown to Ó Riada, Irish folk music was being played ensemble-style in London pubs, but for most people of Ireland this was the first time they heard these tunes played by a band. For some, the membership of Ceoltóirí Chualann overlapped with that of The Chieftains. They recorded the soundtrack of the film Playboy of the Western World (original play by John Millington Synge) in 1962. Their last public performance was in 1969, the album was then called "Ó Riada Sa Gaiety".

== Final years ==
In 1963, Ó Riada was appointed lecturer in music at University College, Cork. He moved to Baile Bhúirne, and not Cúil Aodha (a common misconception) in County Cork, an Irish-speaking area, where he established Cór Chúil Aodha, a male voice choir. He turned toward choral church music, composing two settings of the Mass. Ceol an Aifrinn ("Music of the Mass") was the first Mass written in the Irish language. This featured the hymn "Ag Críost an Síol", which has become popular in its own right, and with such good phrasing, that it is (wrongly) thought by many today to be an ancient medieval tune. Aifreann 2 ("Mass 2") premiered posthumously in 1979. Further works in the "classical" tradition include Five Epigrams from the Greek Anthology (1958) and In memoriam Aloys G. Fleischmann (1964) to words by Hölderlin. Ó Riada also set the poetry of Thomas Kinsella (Three Poems, 1954), who returned the favour by praising Ó Riada in verse.

He became involved in Irish politics and was a friend of several influential leaders. Ó Riada and his wife Ruth drank regularly at a local pub which still advertises itself as being his local.

== Death ==
He suffered cirrhosis of the liver. He was flown to King's College Hospital, London, for treatment and died there. He is buried in St Gobnait's graveyard, Baile Bhuirne, County Cork. Willie Clancy played at his funeral.

== Legacy ==
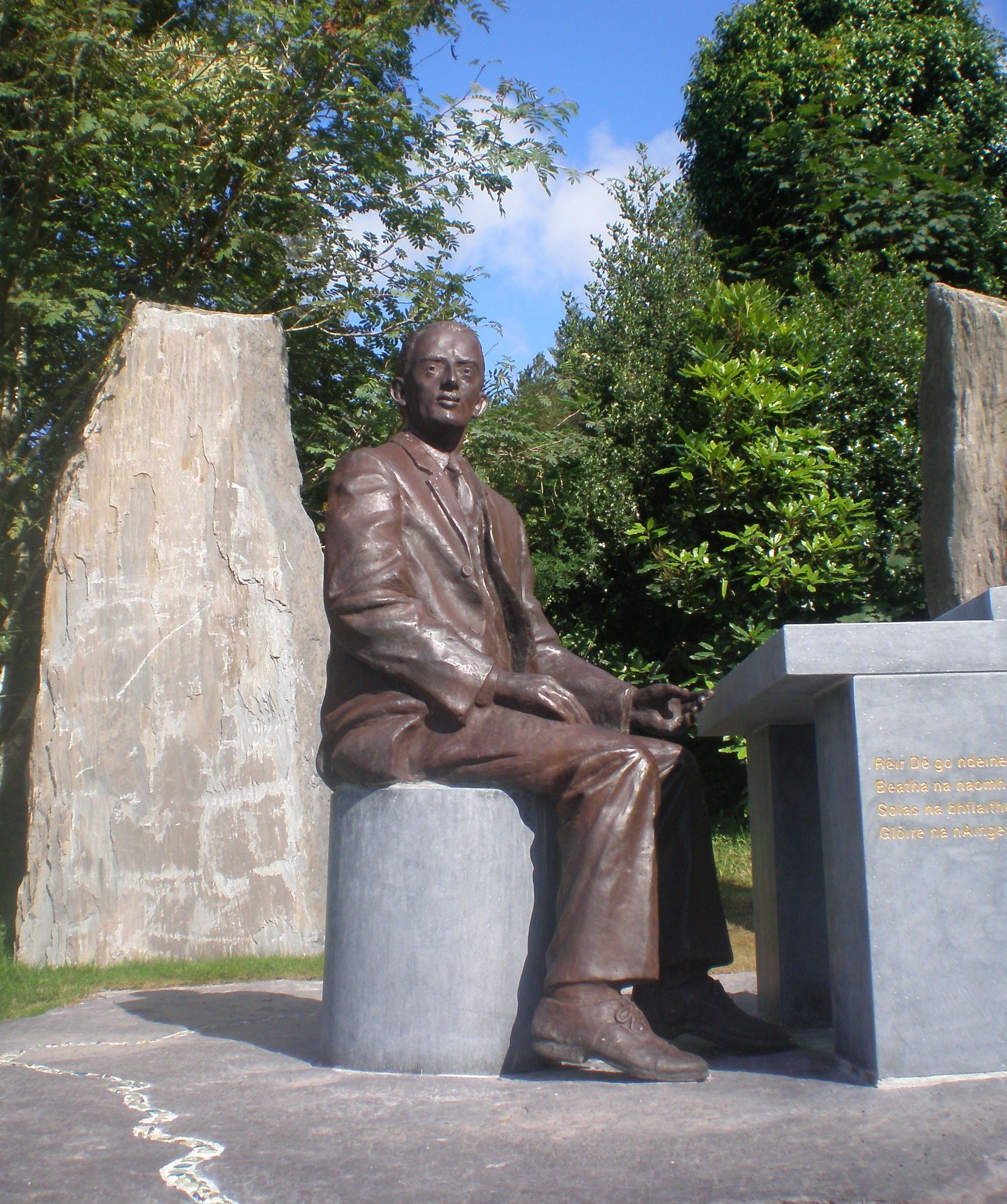
Seán Ó Riada Sculpture in Cúil Aodha church yard

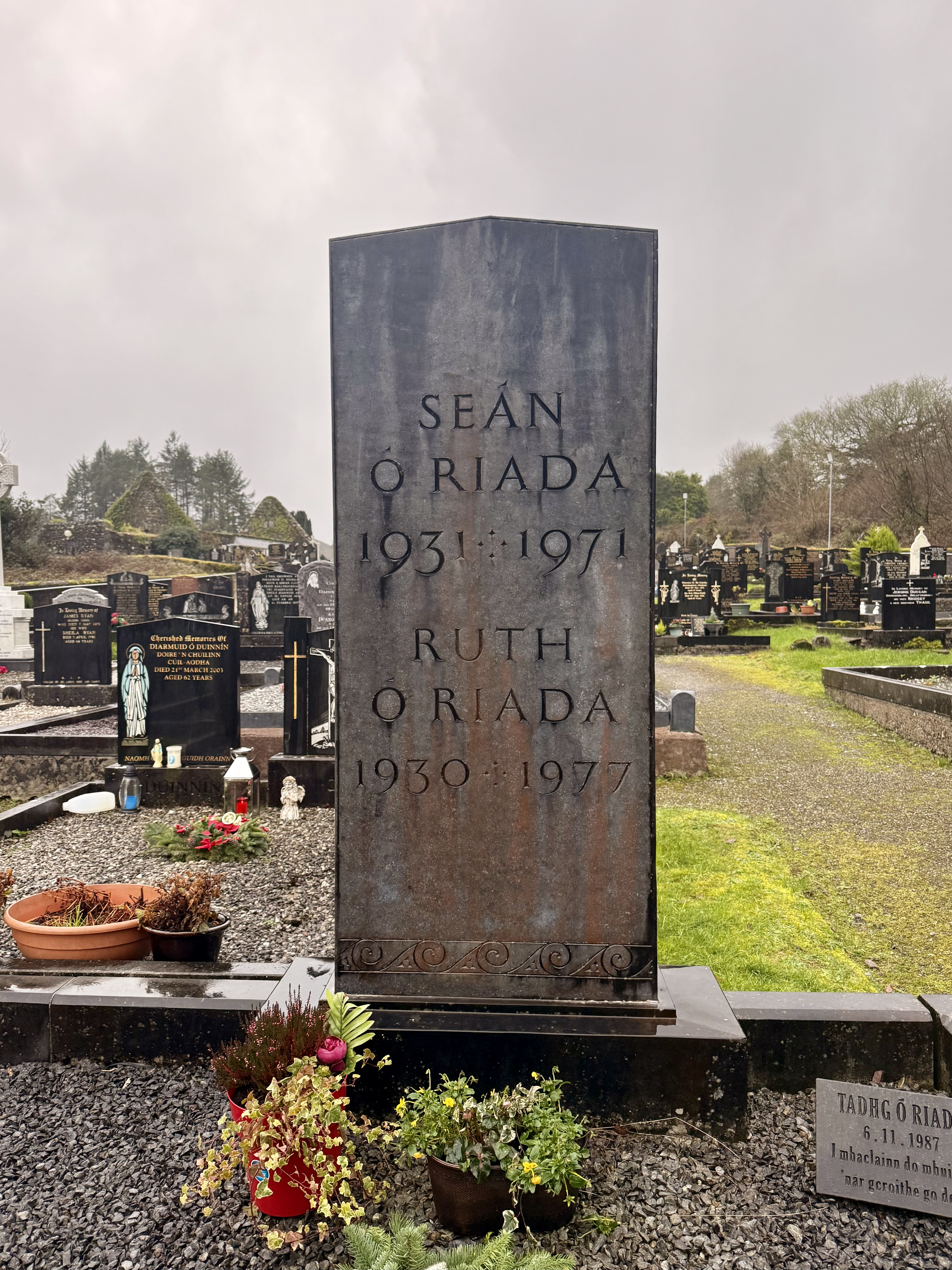
Ó Riada's gravestone, near St Gobnait's well.

Seán Ó Riada and Ceoltóirí Chualann set to music the Peadar Ó Doirnín lyric Mná na hÉireann, which has been recorded or re-used by many artists. As performed by the Chieftains, it is used as a romantic overture throughout the Stanley Kubrick movie Barry Lyndon and is the basis of The Christians' 1989 single Words. His daughter Liadh Ní Riada was elected as Sinn Féin Member of the European Parliament in 2014. She was the Sinn Féin candidate in the 2018 presidential election.

The Irish poet Séamus Heaney included the poem "In Memoriam Seán Ó Riada" in his 1979 collection Field Work. In 2008, a life-sized statue was erected in the grounds of Sépéil Naomh Gobnait, Cúil Aodha.

On 23 April 2010 Ceoltóirí Chualann reformed under the leadership of Peadar Ó Riada to play a tribute concert to Seán Ó Riada in Dublin's Liberty Hall. In 2011, A festival, Féile na Laoch, was organised in his honour by his son, Peadar, between 30 September and 3 October in the honour of heroes (laochra) from the seven 'Muses': Storytelling, Sport, Singing, Poetry, Music, Dancing and Acting centring on Ó Riada. Two schools are named 'Scoil Uí Riada' after him: a Gaelscoil in Kilcock, County Kildare, and another, in Bishopstown, Cork City.

== Works ==
Opera

- Spailpín a Rúin. Opera in 3 acts (1960). First performance: Dublin, Damer Theatre (St Stephen's Green), 15 September 1960.

Orchestral

- Papillons (Schumann) orchestrated (1952)
- Overture Olynthiac (1955)
- The Banks of Sulán. A Pastoral Elegy (1956)
- Nomos No. 1: Hercules Dux Ferrariae for string orchestra (1957)
- Nomos No. 4 for piano and orchestra (1958)
- Aspects of Irish Traditional Music (1959)
- Seoladh na nGamhan. Festival Overture (1959)
- Triptyche pour orchestre symphonique (1960)
- Nomos No. 6 (1966)

Voice with orchestra

- The Lords and the Bards (Robert Farren) for narrator, soloists, chorus, orch. (1959)
- Nomos No. 2 (Sophocles) for baritone, chorus, orch. (1963)

Choral music (without orchestra)

- 'Five Epigrams from the Greek Anthology (anon.) for flute, guitar and mixed chorus (1958)
- Ceathramhhaintí Éagsamhla (words?) for SATB choir a capella (1962)
- Díoghlann Ceoil agus Dána (old Irish liturgy) for SATB choir (1963)
- Requiem for a Soldier (words?) for soloists, chorus and organ (1968)

Songs for voice and piano

- Four Songs (1954). Contains: Autumn; Winter; Spring; Summer.
- Lustra (anon. Chinese in transl.) (1954)
- Three Poems by Thomas Kinsella (1954). Contains: Classical; Night Song 1; Night Song 2.
- Serenade (words?) (1955)
- Four Nursery Rhymes (trad.) (1956). Contains: Humpty Dumpty; Tom, Tom; Rockabye, Baby; Seothín Seó.
- In memoriam Aloys G. Fleischmann: Four Hölderlin Songs (Johann Christian Hölderlin) : Die Heimath; Fragment; Hälfte des Lebens; An Zimmern (1956)
- Hill Field (John Montague) (1965)
- Sekundenzeiger (Hans Arp) (1966)
- Lovers on Aran (Seámus Heaney) (1968)
- Mná na hÉireann (Peadar Ó Doirnín) (1968)

Piano

- Eight Short Preludes (1953)
- Five Epigrams (1954)
- Piano Piece (1957)
- Aon lá sa Mhuileann for harpsichord (1968)
- Ceol (n.d.)

Film scores for orchestra

- Mise Éire (1959)
- Saoirse? (1960)
- Kennedy's Ireland (1960)
- The Death of a Lord Mayor (1960)
- Young Cassidy (1965)
- An Tine Bheo (1966)
- Ceol na Laoi (c.1966)

Others

- Suite of Greek Folksongs for flute, oboe, viola, cello, piano (1958)
- Ceol Máirseála i gcóir Socraide for military band (1968)

Religious music

- Ceol an Aifrinn / Ó Riada Mass (1968)
- Aifreann nua / Aifreann 2 (1970)
- Requiem Mass (1970)

Incidental music to several plays at the Abbey Theatre including An Crúiscín Lán (1956), The Playboy of the Western World (1956), Súgán Sneachta (1959), Mac Uí Rudaí (1961), Ulysses agus Penelope (1965).

== Recordings ==
- Ceolta Éireann / Music of Ireland: Gael-Linn CEF 001 (LP, 1958), re-issued as Gael-Linn CEFCD 001 (CD, 2009). Contains eight traditional Irish songs arranged for baritone and piano.
- Mise Éire: Gael-Linn CEF 002 (EP, 1960); re-issued on Gael-Linn CEF 080 (LP & MC, 1979).
- Saoirse?: Gael-Linn GL 1 (EP, 1960); re-issued on Gael-Linn CEF 080 (LP & MC, 1979).
- Irische Volkslieder: Harmonia Mundi HMS 30691 (LP, 1965). Contains five traditional Irish songs arranged for chamber choir.
- An Tine Bheo: Gael-Linn GL 2 (EP, 1966); re-issued on Gael-Linn CEF 080 (LP & MC, 1979).
- Ceol na Laoi: Gael-Linn GL 14 (EP, 1966).
- Vertical Man: Claddagh Records CSM 1 (LP & MC, 1969). Contains: Nomos No. 1: Hercules Dux Ferrariae, Three Poems by Thomas Kinsella, In memoriam Aloys G. Fleischmann, Hill Field, Sekundenzeiger, Lovers on Aran.
- Ceol na hÉireann – Music of Ireland: Gael-Linn CEF 019 (LP, 1969). Contains: Slán le máigh, Feirmeoir an ghallbhaile (trad. arr. for orch.).
- Ceol an Aifrinn / Ó Riada Mass: Gael-Linn CB 3 (LP & MC, 1971).
- Aifreann nua / Aifreann 2: Gael-Linn CEF 081 (LP & MC, 1979).
- Mise Éire: Gael-Linn CEF CD 134 (CD & LP, 1987). Contains: Mise Éire, Saoirse?, An Tine Bheo.
- Romantic Ireland: Marco Polo 8.223804 (CD, 1995). Contains: The Banks of Sulán.
- Seán Ó Riada: Orchestral Works: RTÉ Lyric fm CD 136 (CD, 2011). Contains: Overture Olynthiac, The Banks of Sulán, Nomos No. 1: Hercules Dux Ferrariae, Seoladh na nGamhan, Nomos No. 4, Mise Éire.
- Ó Riada's Farewell: Claddagh Records CC 12 (LP, 1972). Traditional Irish music played on harpsichord

Recordings by Ceoltóirí Chualann

- Reacaireacht an Riadaigh: Gael-Linn CEF 010 (LP, 1961).
- The Playboy of the Western World: Gael-Linn CEF 012 (LP, 1962).
- Ceol na nUasal: Gael-Linn CEF 015 (LP, 1967).
- ding dong: Gael-Linn CEF 016 (LP, 1967).
- Ó Riada sa Gaiety: (LP, 1971); currently available as Gael-Linn ORIADACD01.
- Port na bPúcaí (Ó Riada solo, but with trad. material, previously unreleased recordings): Gael-Linn ORIADACD07 (CD, 2014)

== Bibliography ==
- Charles Acton: "Seán Ó Riada: The Next Phase", in: Éire-Ireland 2 (1967) 4, pp. 113–22.
- Charles Acton: "Interview with Seán Ó Riada", in: Éire-Ireland 6 (1970) 4, pp. 106–15.
- Aloys Fleischmann: "Seán Ó Riada", Counterpoint: The Magazine of the Music Association of Ireland, November 1971, pp. 12–14; Cork Evening Echo, 11 October 1971, p. 3; The Cork Examiner, 27 September 1991, p. 8.
- Bernard Harris & Grattan Freyer: Integrating Tradition: The Achievement of Seán O Riada (Ballina: Irish Humanities Centre & Keohanes, and Chester Springs, Penn.: Dufour Editions, 1981); ISBN 0-906462-04-5.
- Thomas Kinsella & Tomas Ó Cannain: Our Musical Heritage (Dublin: Dolmen Press, 1982); ISBN 0-85105-389-0.
- Tomás Ó Canainn / Gearóid Mac an Bhua Gerard Victory: Seán Ó Riada: A Shaol agus a Shaothar (Blackrock, Co. Dublin: Gartan, 1993); ISBN 1-85607-090-5.
- Harry White: The Keeper's Recital: Music and Cultural History in Ireland 1770–1970 (Cork: Cork University Press, 1998); ISBN 1-85918-171-6.
- Tomás Ó Canainn: Seán Ó Riada: His Life and Work (Cork: Collins Press, 2003); ISBN 1-903464-40-4.
- Harry White: "Ó Riada, Seán", in: The Encyclopaedia of Music in Ireland, ed. H. White & B.Boydell (Dublin: UCD Press, 2013), vol. 2, p. 803–6; ISBN 978-1-906359-78-2.
