= Donncha Ó Cróinín =

Irish scholar

- Born: 8 December 1919; Ballymakeera, County Cork, Ireland
- Died: 5 June 1990 (aged 70)
- Education: University College Dublin
- Spouse: Margaret Honan (m. 1949)
- Children: 4, including Dáibhí Ó Cróinín
- Mother: Elizabeth Cronin

Donncha Ó Cróinín (8 December 1919 – 5 June 1990) was an Irish scholar. He was the son of the sean-nós singer Elizabeth Cronin and the father of the historian Dáibhí Ó Cróinín.

== Publications ==
- Dillon, Myles; Ó Cróinín, Donncha (1961). Teach Yourself Irish. London: English Universities Press.
