= Ballyvourney =

Village in County Cork, Ireland

Ballyvourney Baile Bhuirne
- Village
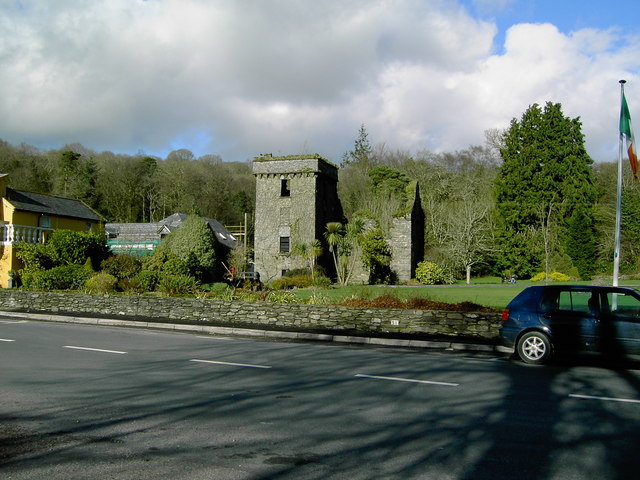
- Ruin of former Colthurst residence, The Mills Inn, Ballyvourney

- Location in Ireland
- Coordinates: 51°56′41.2″N 9°9′47.67″W
- Country: Ireland
- Province: Munster
- County: County Cork
- Irish Grid Reference: W195770
- Baile Bhúirne is the only official name as it is situated in a Gaeltacht (Irish-speaking area).

Ballyvourney (Irish: Baile Bhuirne [ˌbˠalʲə ˈwuːɾˠn̠ʲə], meaning 'Town of the Beloved', also spelled Baile Mhúirne) is a Gaeltacht village in southwest County Cork, Ireland. Ballyvourney is also a civil parish in the barony of Muskerry West, and an ecclesiastical parish in the Roman Catholic Diocese of Cloyne.

== Location and access ==
The village stretches along the N22 road which links Cork city (48 km to the southeast) with Killarney (to the northwest). The nearest large town is Macroom (14 km), while the nearest international airport is Cork Airport. As of 2015, there has been a proposal to construct 22 km of dual carriageway from Coolcour at the eastern side of Macroom, bypassing Macroom to the north and finishing west of Ballyvourney. Bus Éireann Expressway Route 40 between Rosslare Europort and Tralee runs through Ballyvourney.

== Physical geography and political subdivisions ==
The village lies on the River Sullane. In A Topographical Dictionary of Ireland, published by Samuel Lewis in 1837, the river is described as having "its source in the parish, in the mountains bordering on the county of Kerry" and flowing on "eastern course through the parish of Clondrohid to the town of Macroom" before it joins the River Lee.

In this part of Cork, the rivers mainly drain longitudinally from west to east; this is true of the Lee and the Munster Blackwater. Between these rivers lies the valley of the Sullane. To the north of the parish, the Derrynasaggart Mountains and the Boggeragh Mountains separate the valley from the Blackwater valley. To the south, the upland area of Reananerree and the Shehies separate it from the Lee valley. The surrounding district of Muskerry straddles the counties of Cork and Kerry. The highest point in the parish, at 694m, is Mullaghanish (Irish: Mullach an Ois) located just northeast of the village.

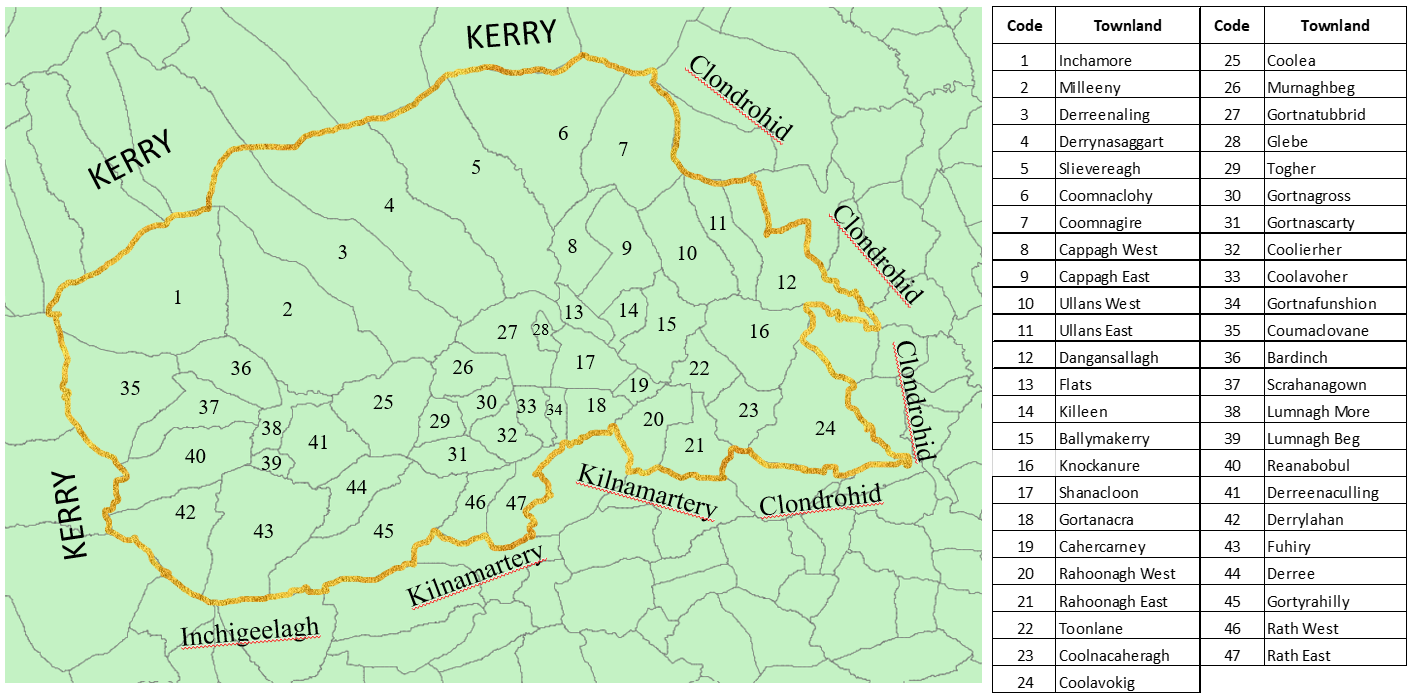
Annotated map of Ballyvourney civil parish

Ballyvourney is one of the 24 civil parishes in the barony of Muskerry West. The barony is the namesake of Baron Muskerry. There are 47 townlands in the civil parish.

Townlands in the civil parish
| Name in Irish | Name in English |
|---|---|
| Baile Mhic Íre | Ballymakeery |
| Barr Duínse | Bardinch |
| Cathair Chearnaigh | Cahercarney |
| An Cheapach Thiar | Cappagh West |
| An Cheapach Thoir | Cappagh East |
| Na Cillíní | Killeen |
| Cnoc an Iúir | Knockanure |
| Com an Ghadhair | Coomnagire |
| Com na Cloiche | Coomnaclohy |
| Com Uí Chlúmháin | Coumaclovane |
| Cúil an Bhuacaigh | Coolavokig |
| Cúil an Mhothair | Coolavoher |
| Cúil Aodha | Coolea |
| An Chúil Iarthach | Coolierher |
| Cúil na Cathrach | Coolnacaheragh |
| Daingean na Saileach | Dangansallagh |
| Doire an Chuilinn | Derreenaculling |
| An Doire Leathan | Derrylahan |
| Doire na Sagart | Derrynasaggart |
| Na Doirí | Derree |
| An Doirín Álainn | Derreenaling |
| Na Foithrí | Fuhiry |
| Gort an Acra | Gortanacra |
| Gort na Fuinseann | Gortnafunshion |
| Gort na gCros | Gortnagross |
| Gort na Scairte | Gortnascarty |
| Gort na Tiobratan | Gortnatubbrid |
| Gort Uí Raithile | Gortyrahilly |
| An Inse Mhór | Inchamore |
| An Lománach Bheag | Lumnagh Beg |
| An Lománach Mhór | Lumnagh More |
| Magh Réidh | Flats |
| Na Millíní | Milleeny |
| An Muirneach Beag | Murnaghbeg |
| An Ráth Thiar | Rath West |
| An Ráth Thoir | Rath East |
| An Rathúnach Thiar | Rahoonagh West |
| An Rathúnach Thoir | Rahoonagh East |
| Ré na bPobal | Reanabobul |
| Screathan na nGabhann | Scrahanagown |
| An tSeanchluain | Shanacloon |
| An Seantóir | Glebe |
| An Sliabh Riabhach | Slievereagh |
| An Tóchar | Togher |
| Tonn Láin | Toonlane |
| Na hUláin Thiar | Ullanes West |
| Na hUláin Thoir | Ullanes East |

The parish is in the electoral division (ED) of An Sliabh Riabhach in the former rural district of Macroom. The ED is part of the Dáil constituency of Cork North-West.

== History ==
Historically, the people of Múscraige had the Corcu Loígde as their overlords. However, they switched allegiance to the Eóganachta and facilitated their rise to power as Kings of Munster. In "Griffith's Valuation of Ireland (1837)", 548 unique records are recorded in the civil parish. Of these, the top 11 surnames accounted for over half over the entries. The townlands with the most recorded surnames, from greatest to least, are: Coolavokig, Derrylahan, Slievereagh, Ballymakeery, Gortnatubbud, Dangansallagh, Derreenaling, Knockanure, Milleeny and Coolea.

During the Irish War of Independence, the IRA ambushed a British rations lorry just south of Ballyvourney on 18 July 1921, resulting in the deaths of two British soldiers, including James Airy.

== Tourism and culture ==
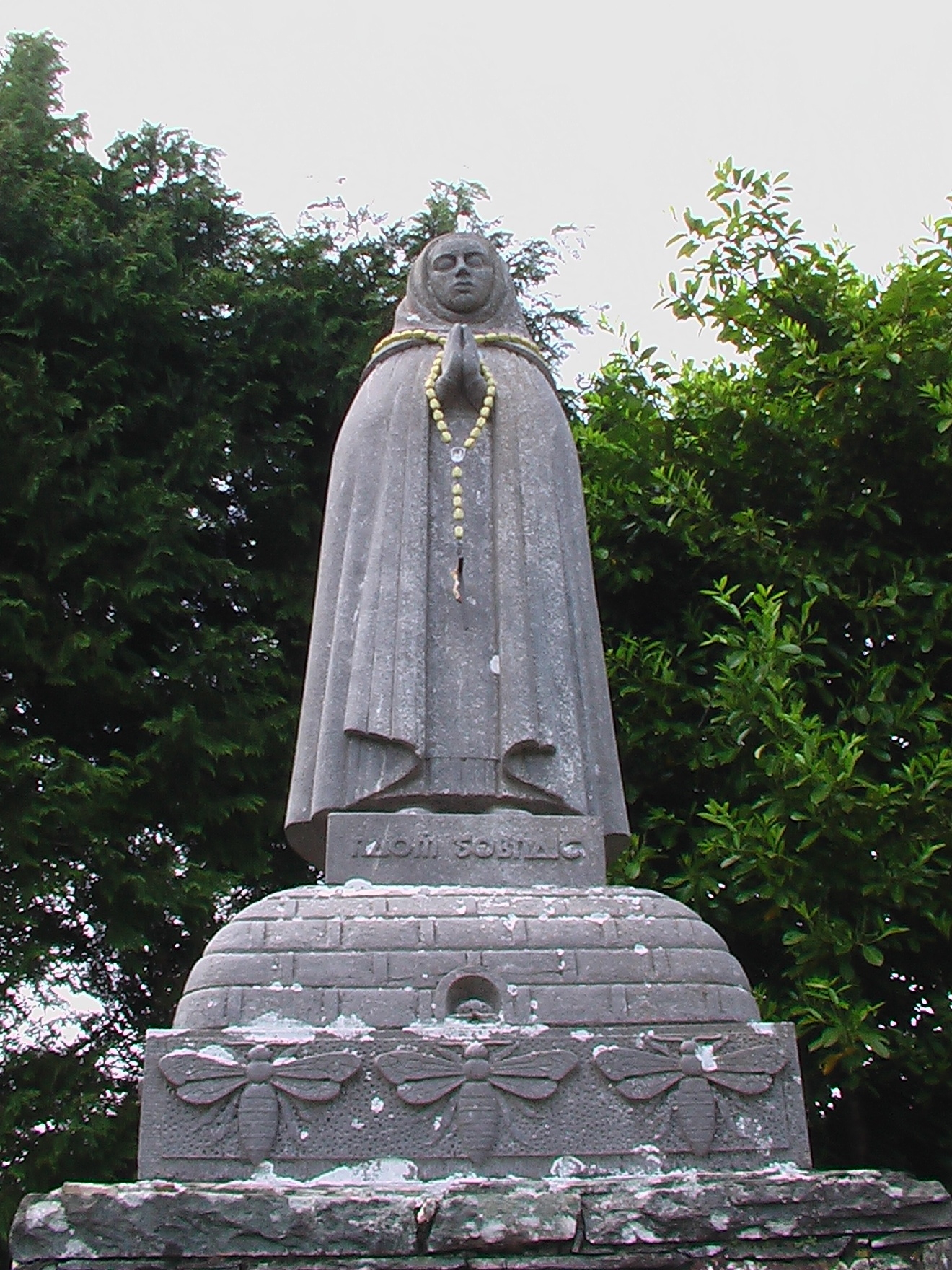
Statue of Saint Gobnait

=== Language ===
Today, the district gives its name to the Muskerry Gaeltacht which is an officially designated Irish-speaking area. According to the 2016 Census about 21% of the population of the "An Sliabh Riabhach" electoral division (where Ballyvourney is located) speak Irish on a daily basis outside the education system. The area's Gaeltacht status draws visitors—as does its architectural heritage.

=== Religion ===
The town is associated with Saint Gobnait and is the site of her abbey, cells and St Gobnait's well. Her Pattern Day, 11 February, is still celebrated by the community. During a Mass at the well, everyone takes water from it. According to legend, Gobnait was born in County Clare in the 6th century. Fleeing from Clare, she took refuge in the Aran Islands, where she encountered an angel who instructed her to go on a journey. The angel told her that when she came upon nine white deer, that would be her place. Travelling south, she came to Clondrohid where she found three white deer. She followed them to Killeens, Ballymakeera where she saw six more. When she found the nine white deer in Baile Bhuirne, she stayed and founded a convent. The remains of the convent are still the locus of pilgrimage, which while it is ostensibly Christian, may well be pagan in origin.

The abbey contains an example of a Sheela na Gigand there are a number of stone circles, stone rows and fulachtaí fia in the area.

=== Music and dance ===
The composer Seán Ó Riada is buried in the cemetery there. The sean-nós singer Elizabeth Cronin spent her whole life in the area.

The village gives its name to an Irish dance figure—the Baile Bhuirne Set The town is the home of Ionad Cultúrtha, a regional cultural centre for the traditional and contemporary arts. It holds many music and visual art events.

The village hosts the annual Crinniú na bhFliúit ('Flute Meet') festival which celebrates traditional Irish flute music. The festival began in 2008 and features classes, workshops, lectures and concerts by traditional musicians including Catherine McEvoy, Conal Ó Gráda, Louise Mulcahy, Hammy Hamilton and Aoife Granville.

== Amenities and attractions ==
St. Gobnet's Wood is an old 30 ha woodland mainly planted in old Sessile Oak. The local national school is called Scoil Aban Naofa and is named after Aban, a saint associated with the area. The secondary school, Coláiste Ghobnatan, was formed in 1989 following the merger of Coláiste Iosagáin (opened c. 1940) and Scoil Ghobnatan (opened 1950). According to the school principal, the school is "named in honour of Saint Gobnait, patron Saint of Baile Bhúirne and indeed we place all our work under her protection".

The grounds of Coláiste Íosagáin, a former De La Salle college, were used as a filming location for Song for a Raggy Boy. The film The Wind That Shakes the Barley was also filmed in nearby locations.

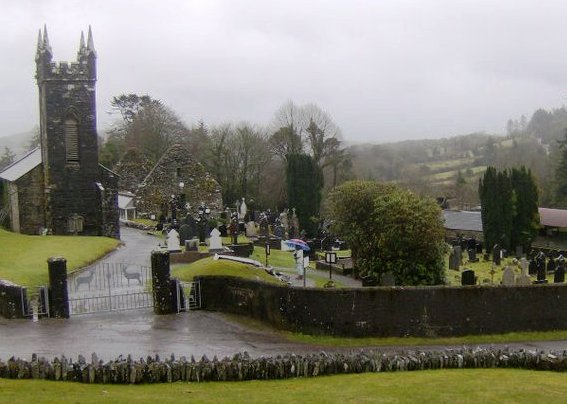
Former church of the Church of Ireland and ruins of St Gobnait's priory

There are several bars and restaurants in the village. One of these, The Mills Inn, is built on the site of the former police barracks. Cultural events include:

- Patron Saint's Day (Irish: Lá Pátrúin), 11 February.
- Whit Sunday feast day.
- Ballyvourney - Coolea Annual Show (Irish: Taispeántas Bhaile Bhúirne), College Field.
- Cultural & Heritage Centre (Irish: Ionad Cultúrtha Baile Bhúirne) which also holds educational programmes and traditional music concerts.
- Irish language courses organised by Gael-Linn in the Irish College (Irish: Coláiste Bhaile Bhúirne).

== Economy ==
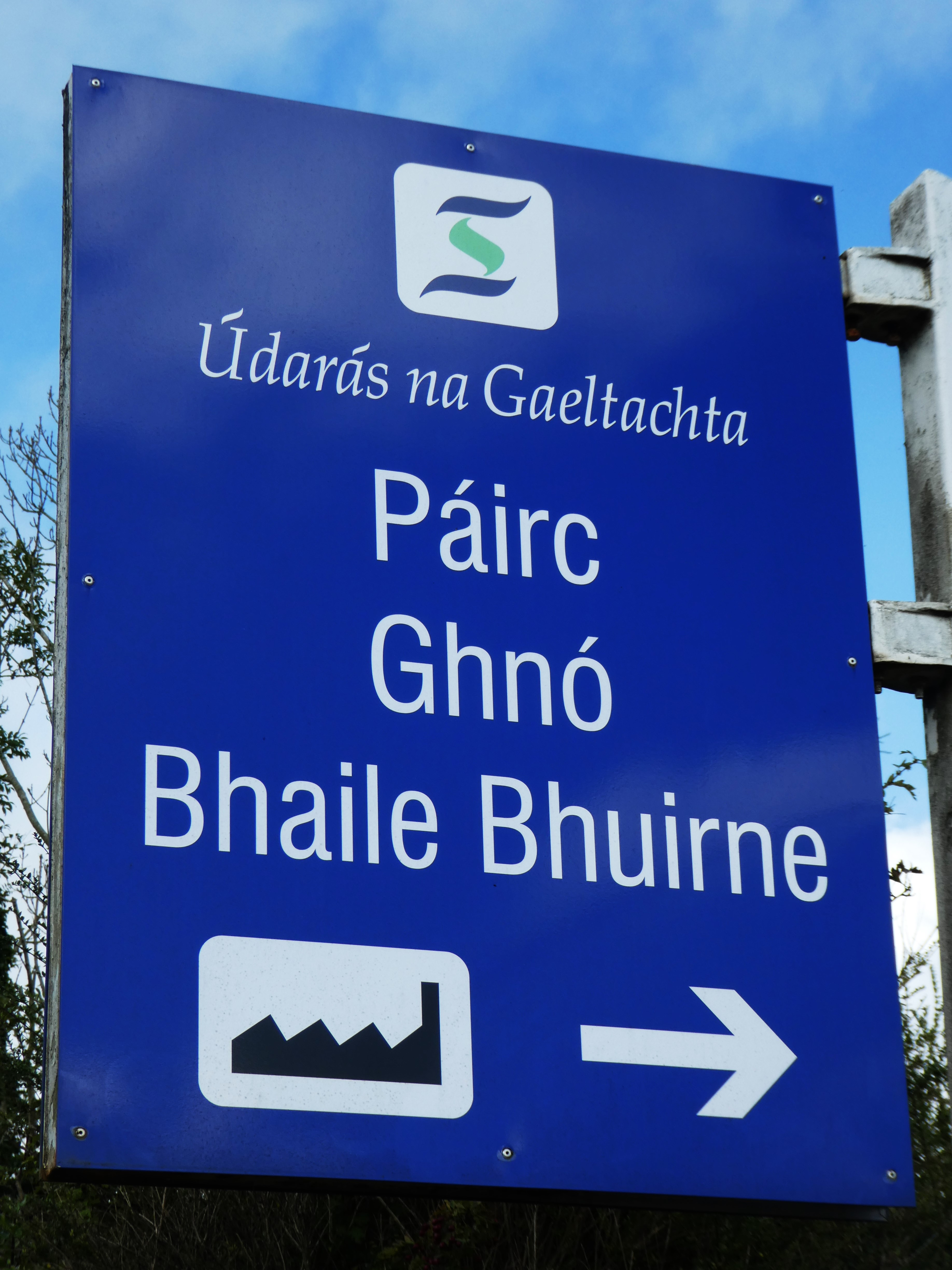
Údarás na Gaeltachta signage at Ballyvourney's business park

Employment opportunities in Ballyvourney range from agricultural, industrial to hospitality sectors. Údarás na Gaeltachta provide grants for businesses, many of which are situated in Ballyvourney's industrial estate.

In 2026, Taoiseach Micheál Martin officially opened Campas Íosagáin, an enterprise, training and research hub in the former Coláiste Íosagáin secondary school.

== Sport ==
The Senior Gaelic football club, Naomh Abán GAA, has a number of championship titles to its name. Anthony Lynch, a native of Ballyvourney and a player on the local football team also plays for the Cork senior football team.

The local association football (soccer) club, Sullane F.C., fields teams in the West Cork league in senior and underage divisions.

== See also ==
- List of towns and villages in Ireland
- List of civil parishes of County Cork
