= Kilgobnet, County Kerry =

Townland in County Kerry, Ireland

Coordinates: 52.0632°N 9.7212°W

Kilgobnet (Irish: Cill Ghobnait, meaning 'St. Gobnet's Church') is a townland and electoral division in County Kerry, Ireland. Located near Killorglin, it is overlooked by the MacGillycuddy's Reeks mountain range. Kilgobnet townland, which is in the civil parish of Knockane, has an area of approximately 1.1 square kilometres (0.42 sq mi). It had a population of 45 people as of the 2011 census.

The townland is named for a medieval church, now in ruins, traditionally associated with St. Gobnait. Other archaeological sites in the townland include a possible Ogham stone and several standing stone and ring fort sites.

The local national (primary) school, Kilgobnet National School, was built in the 1980s to replace an earlier 19th-century building. As of 2024, it had an enrollment of 82 pupils.

== See also ==
- Beaufort, County Kerry
