= Cúil Aodha =

Village in County Cork, Ireland

Cúil Aodha Coolea
- Village
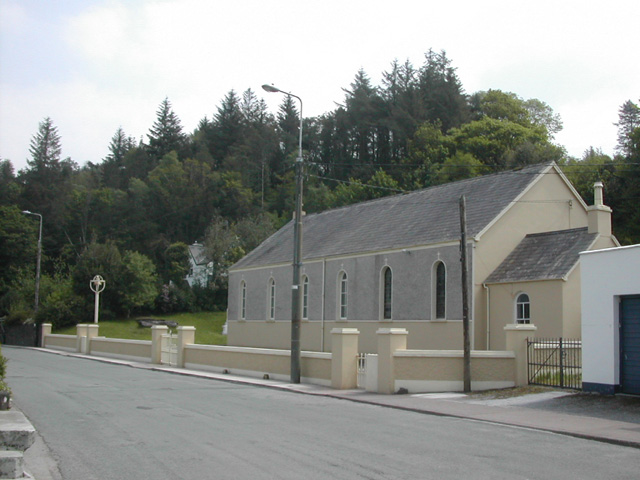
- Church in Cúil Aodha

- Location in Ireland
- Coordinates: 51°55′41″N 09°13′07″W
- Country: Ireland
- Province: Munster
- County: County Cork
- Cúil Aodha is the only official name.

Cúil Aodha (pronounced [ˌkuːlʲ ˈeː]), anglicised as Coolea, is a townland and village in the Gaeltacht region of Muskerry in County Cork, Ireland. The area is near the source of the River Sullane in the Derrynasaggart Mountains.

== Geography ==
Cúil Aodha townland is in the civil parish of Ballyvourney, and is an official Gaeltacht area, where the Irish language is used alongside English.

The village of Cúil Aodha is close to a number of wind farms which are located on the mountains which mark the border between County Cork and County Kerry. The area is mountainous and is led to by mainly narrow roadways.

Cúil Aodha lies within the Cork North-West Dáil constituency.

According to the 2016 census, of the 216 people living in Cúil Aodha and the small area surrounding it, 86% were able to speak Irish. In the Gort na Tiobratan electoral division, in which the village is located, 45% of that population (353 people) stated that they speak Irish on a daily basis outside the education system.

== Economy ==
Coolea cheese is produced in the area. The Mark Éire factory, which specialises in climate control technology, opened in 1987 and is still manages its Irish operations from Cúil Aodha village. There are no amenities such as bars, shops or restaurants in the village. These can be found in nearby Ballyvourney.

== Culture ==
The area surrounding Cúil Aodha was used as a filming location for both Song for a Raggy Boy (2003), directed by Aisling Walsh, and The Wind That Shakes the Barley (2006), directed by Ken Loach.

In 1986, Cúil Aodha was twinned with the village of Peumerit-Quintin in Brittany in northwestern France.

== People ==
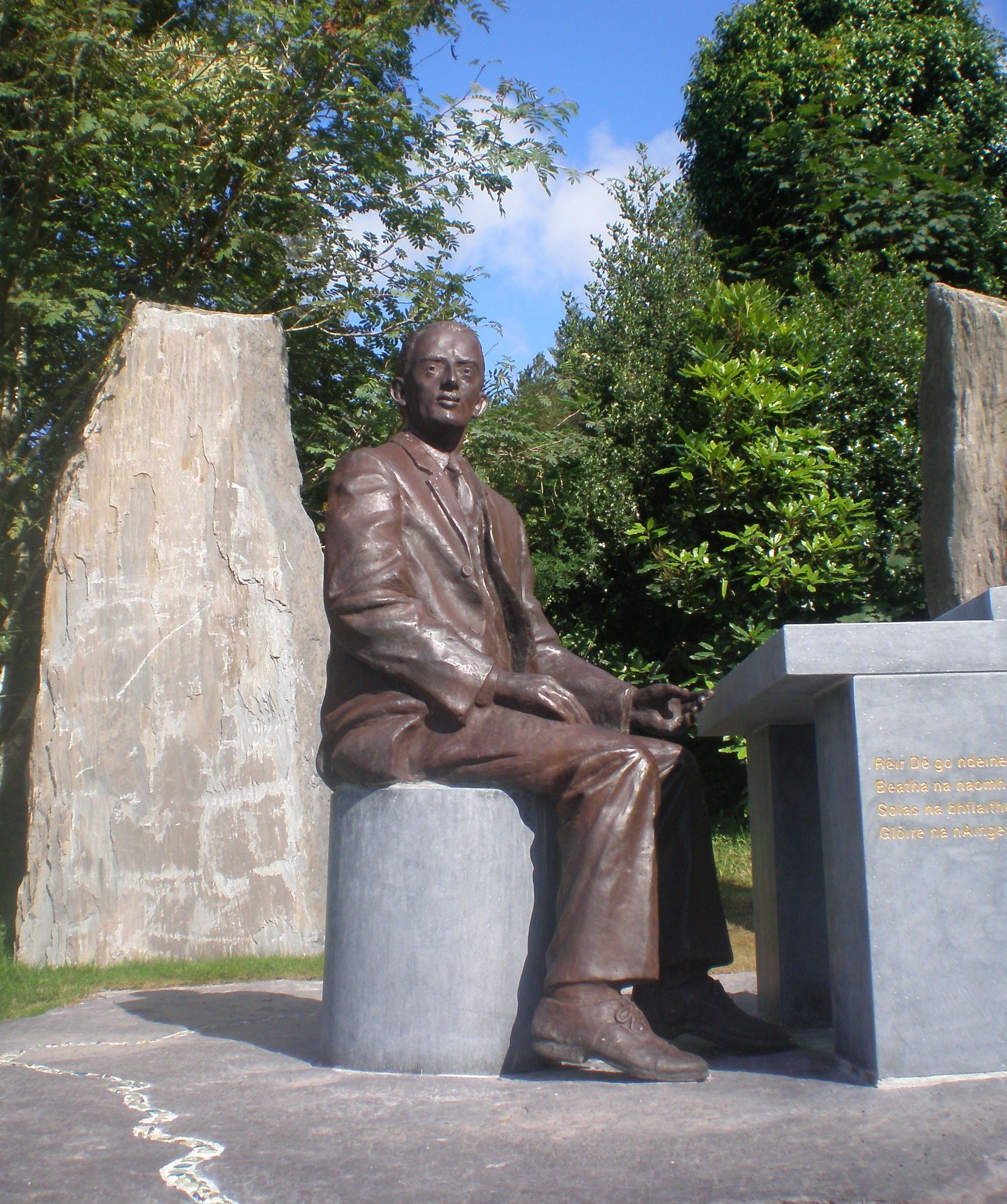
Seán Ó Riada sculpture in Cúil Aodha

- Seán Ó Riada (1931–1971), Irish composer, lived in the area between Cúil Aodha village and Ballyvourney until his death, and a bronze monument commemorating him was erected in the area in 2008. His son, Peadar Ó Riada, still conducts the choir 'Cór Chúl Aodha'.
- William Hedges (1632–1701), first governor of the East India Company)
- Iarla Ó Lionáird (b. 1964), singer and record producer
- Páidí Ó Lionáird (b. 1968), television presenter and columnist
- Donncha Ó Céileachair (1918–1960), writer and biographer
- Síle Ní Chéileachair (1924–1985), short story writer

== Transport ==
The area is rural and has a dispersed population around the valley. No bus service operates to the village. The nearest Bus Éireann route is the Cork to Tralee route which passes through Ballyvourney which is approximately 2 miles from Cúil Aodha village.

== See also ==
- List of towns and villages in Ireland
