= Dáibhí Ó Cróinín =

Irish historian

Professor Dáibhí Ó Cróinín
- Born: Dáibhí Iarla Ó Cróinín; 29 August 1954 (age 72)
- Occupation: Academic
- Known for: His 1985 discovery in a manuscript in Padua of the "lost" Irish 84-year Easter table
- Parent: Donncha Ó Cróinín (father)
- Relatives: Elizabeth Cronin (grandmother)

Academic background
- Education: B.A. in Early Irish History (1975); M.Phil. in Medieval Studies (1977); Ph.D. (1985)
- Alma mater: University College Dublin; University College Galway

Academic work
- Discipline: Historian
- Sub-discipline: Middle Ages
- Institutions: NUI Galway

Dáibhí Iarla Ó Cróinín (born 29 August 1954) is an Irish historian and authority on Hiberno-Latin texts, noted for his significant mid-1980s discovery in a manuscript in Padua of the "lost" Irish 84-year Easter table. Ó Cróinín was professor of history at NUI Galway and Member of the Royal Irish Academy. He specialises in the history of Ireland, Britain and Europe during the Middle Ages and Hiberno-Latin texts.

== Early life and education ==
Ó Cróinín received a B.A. in Early Irish History from University College Dublin (UCD) in 1975 and an M.Phil. in Medieval Studies from the same in 1977.

== Academia ==
While wandering around Padua in the mid-1980s Ó Cróinín happened upon an example of the Irish 84-year Easter table in a manuscript there - this Easter table, so central to the Easter controversy, had until that time been presumed lost but Ó Cróinín had found one covering the period AD 438–521. For this he received his Ph.D. from University College Galway in 1985; the Pontifical Institute of Mediaeval Studies at the University of Toronto published Ó Cróinín's work on that seventh-century Hiberno-Latin computistical tract which he had discovered. Alongside Daniel McCarthy, Ó Cróinín published "The 'Lost' Irish 84-Year Easter Table Rediscovered" in the journal Peritia in the late 1980s, explaining the implications of his discovery for our understanding of the period.

Ó Cróinín succeeded Donnchadh Ó Corráin as editor of Peritia at some point in the mid-2010s.

== Publications ==
A list of Ó Cróinín's books follows:

- The Irish Sex Aetates Mundi, Dublin (1982)
- Cummian's letter 'De controversia Paschali' together with a related Irish compustical tract 'De rationae conputanti', edited with Maura Walsh (Pontifical Institute of Medieval Studies; Studies and texts, lxxxvi), Toronto (1988)
- An Cúigiú Díochlaonadh, Indreabhan, Connamara (1994)
- Early Medieval Ireland, 400–1200, London and New York (1995)
- The Songs of Elizabeth Cronin, Irish Traditional Singer, Dublin (2000)
- Early Irish History and Chronology, Dublin (2003)
- A New History of Ireland, volume one, Dublin (2006)

== Awards and honours ==
Ó Cróinín was awarded the Parnell Fellowship in Irish Studies at the University of Cambridge for the year 2017–18.

== Personal life ==
His father was the scholar Donncha Ó Cróinín (1919–1990), and his paternal grandmother was the sean-nós singer Elizabeth Cronin (1879–1956).
