= Síle Ní Chéileachair =

Síle Ní Chéileachair (1924 – 1985) was an Irish short story writer who wrote in the Irish language. She was one of the authors of a highly regarded collection published jointly with her brother, Donncha Ó Céileachair.

She was born on 25 July 1924 in Cúil Aodha, an Irish-speaking district in County Cork. She trained as a teacher at Mary Immaculate College in Limerick and subsequently taught at Harold's Cross and at Crumlin, Dublin. In 1953 she married Dónal Ó Cochláin and they had three sons and three daughters. The household lived in Dublin.

She and her brother were involved with Cumann na Scríbhneoirí (The Irish-language Writers’ Association) in Dublin in the nineteen fifties. She won a prize for a short story at the 1950 Oireachtas, and in 1955 she and Donncha published Bullaí Mhártain, an acclaimed collection of 14 stories dealing with urban and rural themes. This collection has been praised for its concise style and broad range of subject matter.

She died on 26 August 1985 and was buried at Bohernabreena in Dublin.
