= Peadar Ó Riada =

Irish composer

- Born: 1954 (age 71–72); Cúil Aodha, Cork, Ireland
- Occupation: Composer
- Years active: 1971-present

Peadar Ó Riada (born 1954) is an Irish composer, musician and broadcaster. Living in the Muskerry Gaeltacht region of Cúil Aodha, he is the son and eldest child of the Irish composer, Seán Ó Riada.

== Early life ==
O'Riada was born in Cúil Aodha in 1954. He attended University College Cork where he graduated with a degree in music in 1976. After his father's death in 1971, he took over as choir director of Cór Chúl Aodha where he continued to compose both liturgic and secular works.

== Career ==
Ó Riada has released numerous CDs in various genres related to the Irish idiom including; choral, traditional, piano. He has published several books and articles on various subjects including the children’s book Scéalta Shéamuis.

== Musical works ==
- Triúr sa Draighean
- Triúr arís 2011
- Amidst These Hills
- Winds gentle whisper
- Laoi na Laoithe
- Go mBeannaítear Duit
- Ceol Is Cibeal Chúil Aodha (1978)
- Dir Cúm Thola is Cúil Aodha
- Caoineadh Airt Uí Laoghaire
- Go mBeannaitear Duit (2008)
- Ceol Rinnce Gaelach Nua (2022)

O'Riada is also a broadcaster and has a weekly traditional music show on RTÉ Raidió na Gaeltachta.

== Personal life ==
O'Riada lives today in Cúil Aodha. He has also been a professional beekeeper, founding the company "Mil an tSuláin".

In June 2020, he was named Cork Person of the Month. He was awarded an honorary masters degree in music from University College, Cork, in 2023.

He is a brother of the Sinn Féin politician Liadh Ní Riada and an uncle of musician and broadcaster Doireann Ní Ghlacáin. In 2026 he announced that he was undergoing treatment for cancer.

== Publications ==
- The Mass Settings of Seán and Peadar Ó Riada (2017) - ISBN 978-1-78-205235-7
- Ceoltóirí Chualann: The Band that Changed the Course of Irish Music (2024) - ISBN 978-1-78-117869-0
