= St. Gobnet's Wood =

Conservation area near Ballyvourney, County Cork, Ireland

Coordinates: 51°56′29″N 9°10′00″W

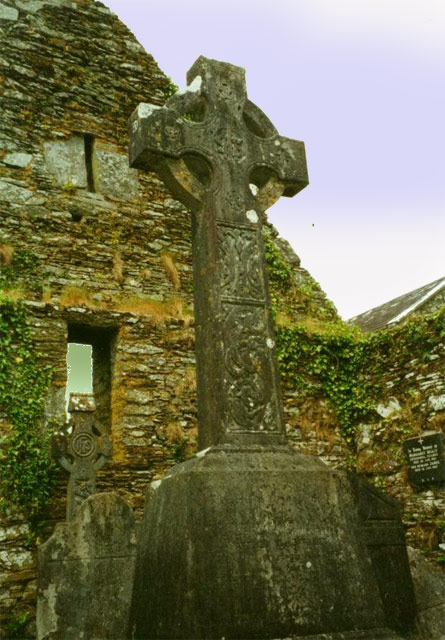
St Gobnait's Wood is named for Saint Gobnait, whose church lies just south of the wood

St Gobnet's Wood (alternative spelling: St. Gobnait's Wood) is a protected area of oak woodland at Baile Bhuirne, County Cork, Ireland. It is on the north-east side of a hill immediately south of the village, and takes its name from the church of Saint Gobnait (or Gobnet) which is also nearby. Along with Cascade Wood, St Gobnet's Wood is included in a fragmented Special Area of Conservation.

In 1998 St Gobnet's Wood was proposed as a Site of Community Importance under the EU Habitats Directive. The National Parks and Wildlife Service gave the area of the wood as about 30 hectares (ha). Subsequently, Cascade Wood, on the northern side of the N22 road, was identified as supporting various species of bats and the Kerry slug, animals protected under the Habitats Directive. In 2007 the Irish Environment Minister, John Gormley, proposed the expansion of the 'St Gobnet's Wood Special Area of Conservation' to include Cascade Wood. The European Environment Agency's records show the site as covering 44 ha on both sides of the main road, following an update in 2008.

== Impact of upgrade to road ==
When the Irish government gave protection to Cascade Wood, it was intended that the alignment of a proposed by-pass should avoid the SAC. However, it proved difficult to find a new route for the road in question, the Macroom-Baile Bhuirne section of the N22, leading the authorities to go ahead with a route through Cascade Wood, as had previously been proposed.

It was decided to relocate Kerry slugs in the path of the upgraded road to suitable habitat elsewhere, and in 2018 it was reported that the necessary environmental works were underway. Construction of the road itself began in 2020.
