= Donncha Ó Céileachair =

Irish-language writer

Donncha Ó Céileachair (1918 – 1960) was a prominent writer in the Irish language. He and his sister, Síle Ní Chéileachair, published an influential collection of short stories, and he was also notable as a biographer and travel writer.

== Personal life ==
He was born in Cúil Aodha in West Cork and was raised in an environment in which Irish was the family language. He qualified as a teacher in De La Salle College in Waterford. He was teaching in a Christian Brothers school in Dublin when the Education Department recruited him to work on the English-Irish dictionary edited by Tomás de Bhaldraithe (published 1959). Before returning to teaching he spent some time working for the Irish Placenames Commission. He acquired an MA on the Irish of Muskerry from University College Dublin. He married Eistir Ní Éalaithe, also a teacher, in 1952, and they had four children. He died unexpectedly of poliomyelitis on 21 July 1960. He is buried in Glasnevin Cemetery, Dublin.

== Writing career ==
Ó Céileachair, described as "a prolific and highly regarded author of short stories and non-fiction in Irish," acquired his first experience in writing from helping his father, a traditional native speaker of Irish, write his autobiography. He attended a course given by the writer Daniel Corkery in Cúil Aodha on the art of the short story, and in 1955 he and his sister Síle published a jointly written and well-received collection of 14 stories called Bullaí Mhártain, with both rural and urban settings. The collection has been praised for its concision, variety and ease of style.

In 1958 Ó Céileachair and Proinsias Ó Conluain published An Duinníneach, a joint biography of the lexicographer and literary scholar Father Patrick Dinneen, a leading figure in the Gaelic Revival. This has been described as an extremely important work, not least because of the impressive density of the social, political and literary background.

He also wrote Dialann Oilithrigh, an account of a pilgrimage to Rome, described by critics as being not a traditionally pious description but a lively and stylish diary with clear insight into the author’s mind.

Ó Céileachair also wrote articles for various newspapers and was responsible for several translations, sometimes in collaboration with the authors.
