= Ballymakeera =

Village in County Cork, Ireland

Ballymakeera Baile Mhic Íre
- Village
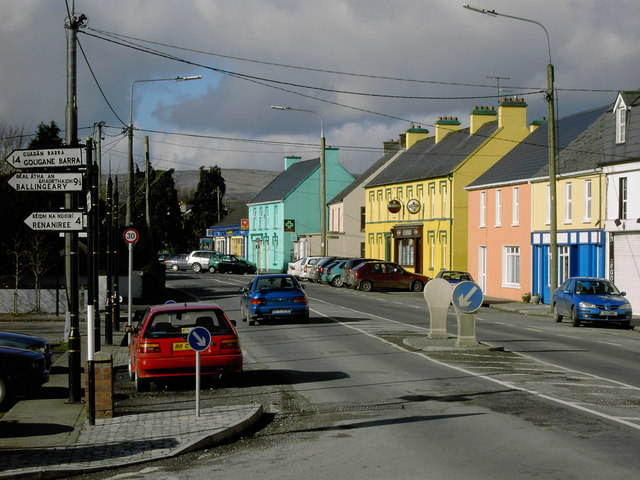
- Baile Mhic Íre on the N22

- Location in Ireland
- Coordinates: 51.93558°N 9.143667°W
- Country: Ireland
- Province: Munster
- County: County Cork
- Elevation: 118 m (387 ft)

Population (2022)
  - Total: 366

Ballymakeera or Ballymakeery (Irish: Baile Mhic Íre [ˈbˠalʲə vʲɪc ˈiːɾʲə], meaning "Townland of the Sons of Íre") is a small townland and Gaeltacht village in the civil parish of Ballyvourney, barony of Muskerry West, County Cork, Ireland.

The village, which in turn has postal addresses of Ballymakeera East and Ballymakeera West, forms part of the twin villages of Ballymakeery and Ballyvourney. The village is situated in the valley of the River Sullane on the N22 national primary road. It is within the Muskerry Gaeltacht. Ballymakeera is part of the Dáil constituency of Cork North-West.

Three Ogham stones are nearby with the somewhat later addition of a Christian shrine to St Abán.

== Notable people ==
The sean-nós singer Elizabeth Cronin lived in the village.

== See also ==
- List of towns and villages in Ireland
