= Elizabeth Cronin =

Irish singer (1879–1956)

- Eibhlís Uí Chróinín
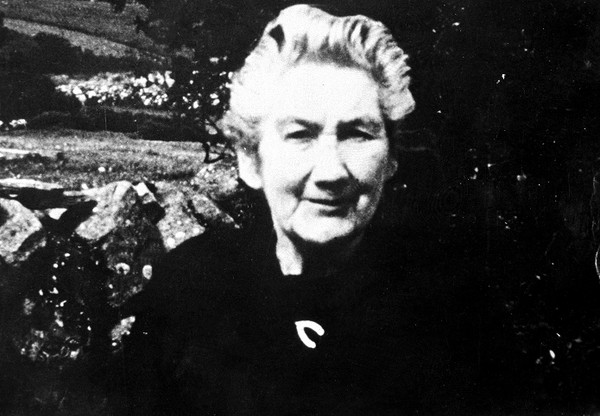
- Born: Eibhlís Ní Iarlaithe; 29 May 1879; Ballyvourney, County Cork, Ireland
- Died: 2 June 1956 (aged 77); Macroom, County Cork, Ireland
- Known for: Sean-nós singing
- Children: 5, including Donncha Ó Cróinín
- Relatives: Dáibhí Ó Cróinín (grandson)

Elizabeth "Bess" Cronin (Irish: Eibhlís Uí Chróinín; 29 May 1879 – 2 June 1956) was an influential singer of Irish traditional music in the sean-nós style. She sang hundreds of songs which she learnt as a youth, half of which were in the Irish language, which was her first language. She was visited and recorded by prominent collectors of traditional music including Alan Lomax, Jean Ritchie, Peter Kennedy and Seamus Ennis. Some of her songs inspired popular recordings, such as her version of Siúil a Rún, which was covered by Clannad and Celtic Women.

== Early life and family ==
Elizabeth Cronin was born on 29 May 1879 in Rath West (Irish: An Ráth Thiar), in the civil parish of Ballyvourney, County Cork. Her name at birth was Eibhlis Ní Iarlaithe, but she was nicknamed ‘Bess’, and later ‘The Muskerry Queen of Song’ and 'The Queen of Irish Song'. Cronin was the eldest daughter of Maighréad Ní Thuama and Seán ‘Máistir’ Ó hIarlaithe, who was a village headmaster in a school of Barr d’Ínse (hence ‘Máistir'), in the Fuithirí area of West Cork, near the Cork-Kerry border. Cronin had five other siblings, four sisters: Mary Anne (b. 1882), Johanna (b. 1885), Nora (b. 1890) and Ellie (b. 1891), one brother: Tom (b. 1888) and two half-brothers: Dan and Tim, from her father's first marriage. The entire Cronin family, including Elizabeth, spoke Irish as their first language and worked to promote it, and her mother was a professor of the language.

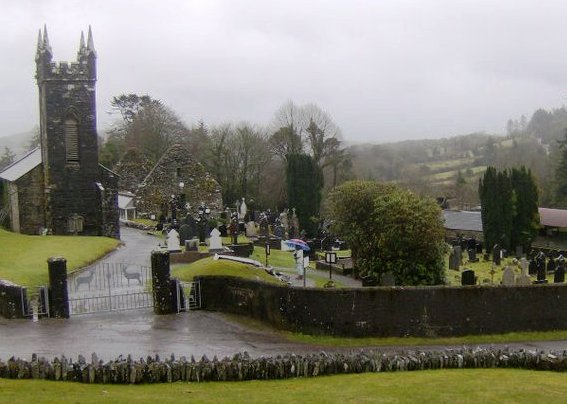
Ballyvourney Churchyard

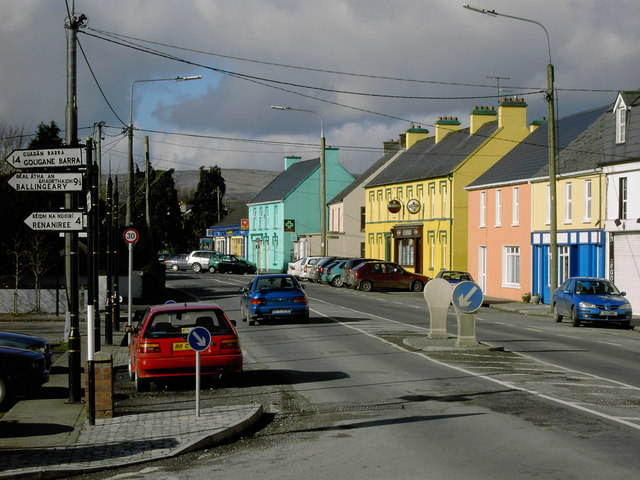
Baile Mhic Íre (Ballymakeera)

She spent her teenage years on a nearby farm owned by her childless aunt (her mother's sister) and uncle, Tomás Ó hIarfhlaithe (Tomás Bheirty). She learnt many of her songs and stories as a young teenager from farm servants who came and went for periods of five to six months, as well as others from her mother, cousins and friends.

Due to Cronin's father being a teacher and her grandfather and uncle having a big interest in books, she was exposed to literature and the written word more than most would have been at the time.

After she married Seán Ó Croinin, she moved to Carraig an Adhmaid, Baile Mhic Íre (Ballmakeera) to the Cronin family farm which was known as 'The Old Plantation'. She remained in the Baile Bhuirne area her whole life.

== Music ==
Cronin sang songs both in English and in her local dialect of the Irish language, which particularly interested collectors.

She made her first public appearance in 1899 at the age of 20 in a Feis in Macroom, singing two sean-nós songs in Irish. Her career as a youth involved singing at weddings and parties, whilst also singing to pass the time when milking cows.

She was visited and recorded by The Irish Folklore Commission, Seamus Ennis and Marie Slocombe (both with the BBC), Peter Kennedy, Jean Ritchie / George Pickow, Diane Hamilton, Brian George, Robin Roberts, and the ethnomusicologist and folklorist Alan Lomax. Lomax included her songs in the Irish volume of his 18-volume "Columbia World Library of Folk and Primitive Music," which he edited whilst in London during the 1950s.

Over 80 of Cronin's songs are on tape, however many are not available to the public but confined to her private collection. She never received a recording contract from her career in Irish traditional music.

Her sons Donncha and Sean assisted in the physical recording of many of their mother's songs, and her grandson Daibhi O Croinin, a professor of early medieval history, compiled a book of 200 of her songs.

Towards the latter-end of Cronin's life, her music was grouped together into a collection called "The Commercial Recordings".

There is a version of "Lord Gregory" (The Lass of Roch Royall) by Cronin on the Cultural Equity website.

== Illness and death ==
In Cronin's last recordings, including "The Bonny Blue-Eyed Lassie" recorded by Diane Hamilton in 1955, it was evident that she had become exhausted and struggled to sing. Cronin fell ill to the blood-related diseases toxaemia and anaemia,. She died in hospital in Macroom on 2 June 1956, at the age of 77.

== Legacy ==
Séamus Ennis referred to Cronin as the "Muskerry Queen of Song".

She created some records during her life which are still to this day widely available in the Irish traditional music archive. Most of her songs covered the topics of home and family, including "The Little Pack of Tailors", "Pussy Cats Party", "The Good Ship Kangaroo" and "Uncle Rat".

The tune and the lyrics of her version of Siúil a Rún were the foundation of many subsequent recordings, including those of Clannad and Celtic Women. Cronin also influenced Irish singers such as Christy Moore and Martin Carthy and Seamus Ennis. Her songs are still played on RTÉ Radio and are available on YouTube and Spotify.

Her continued use of the local Irish dialect "galvanised her local community".

Many of Bess Cronin's songs are regularly performed in her native Baile Mhuirne and further afield. Among those who sing songs associated with Bess is celebrated singer Iarla Ó Lionáird - who is a grand-nephew of Bess' - grandson of Eibhlín Ní Iarfhlaithe (Uí Shúilleabháin), of Gort na Scairte, Baile Mhuirne.
