= Gobnait =

Irish saint

Saint Gobnait
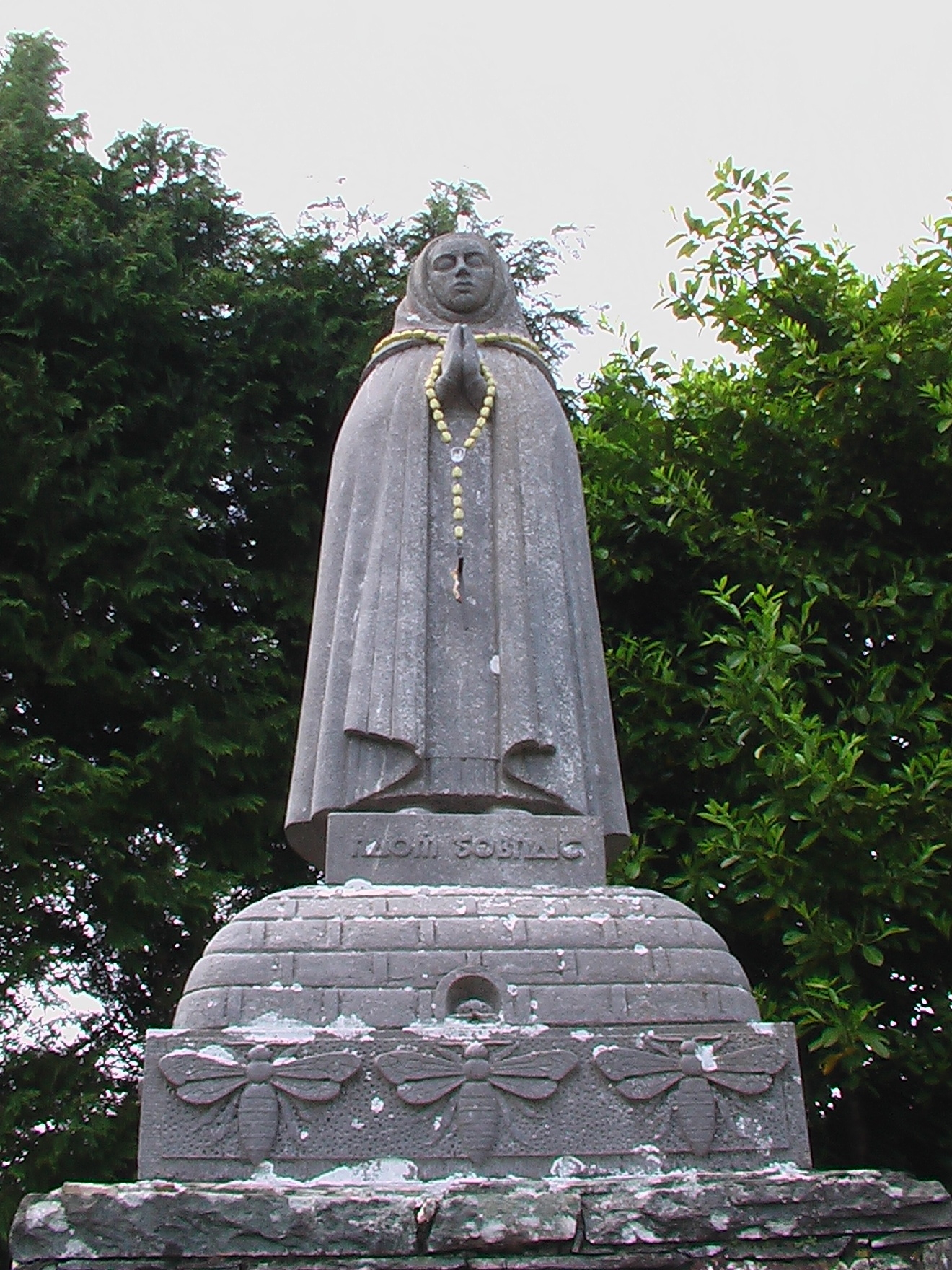
- Statue of Saint Gobnait, by Séamus Murphy, 1951

Monastic Foundress
- Born: fl. 6th century
- Venerated in: Roman Catholic Church; Eastern Orthodox Church
- Feast: February 11
- Patronage: bees

Saint Gobnait (fl. 6th century?), also known as Gobnat or Mo Gobnat or Abigail or Deborah, is the name of an early medieval female Irish saint whose church was Móin Mór, later Bairnech, in the village of Ballyvourney (Irish: Baile Bhuirne), County Cork in Ireland. She is associated with the Múscraige and her church and convent lay on the borders between the Múscraige Mittine and Eóganacht Locha Léin. Her feast day is February 11.

== Sources ==
No hagiographical Life is known to have described her life and miracles, but she appears in the Life of her senior companion St Abbán moccu Corbmaic, written in the early thirteenth century but known only through later recensions. Saint Finbarr's Life implies that Gobnait's church belonged to Finbarr's foundation at Cork by alleging that it was not founded by her, but by one of his disciples. In spite of this, Gobnait's cult continued to thrive here and the ruins of a medieval church dedicated to her are still visible today.

The Félire Óengusso and the Martyrology of Donegal give her feast-day on 11 February.

"Mo Gobnat from Muscraige Mitaine, i.e. a sharp-beaked nun,
Ernaide is the name of the place in which she is.
Or Gobnat of Bairnech in Món Mór in the south of Ireland,
and of the race of Conaire she is; a virgin of Conaire's race"
–Note to the Félire Óengusso, tr. Whitley Stokes, p. 73

== Life ==
Gobnait was born in County Clare in the fifth or sixth Century, and is said to have been the sister of Saint Abban. She fled a family feud, taking refuge in Inisheer in the Aran Islands. In early Christian times St Gobnait was said to be the only woman allowed on the island. While on Inisheer, an angel appeared and told her that she was not destined to remain there, and that she should look for a place where she would find nine white deer grazing. She found the deer at the place now known as St. Gobnet's Wood. Saint Abban is said to have worked with her on the foundation of the convent and to have placed Saint Gobnait over it as abbess.

Celtic lore held bees in high esteem, believing the soul left the body as a bee or a butterfly. Gobnait is said to have added beekeeping to her life's work, developing a lifelong affinity with them. She started a religious order and dedicated her days to helping the sick. It has been speculated that she used honey as a healing aid. She is credited with saving the people at Ballyvourney from the plague.

== Legends ==
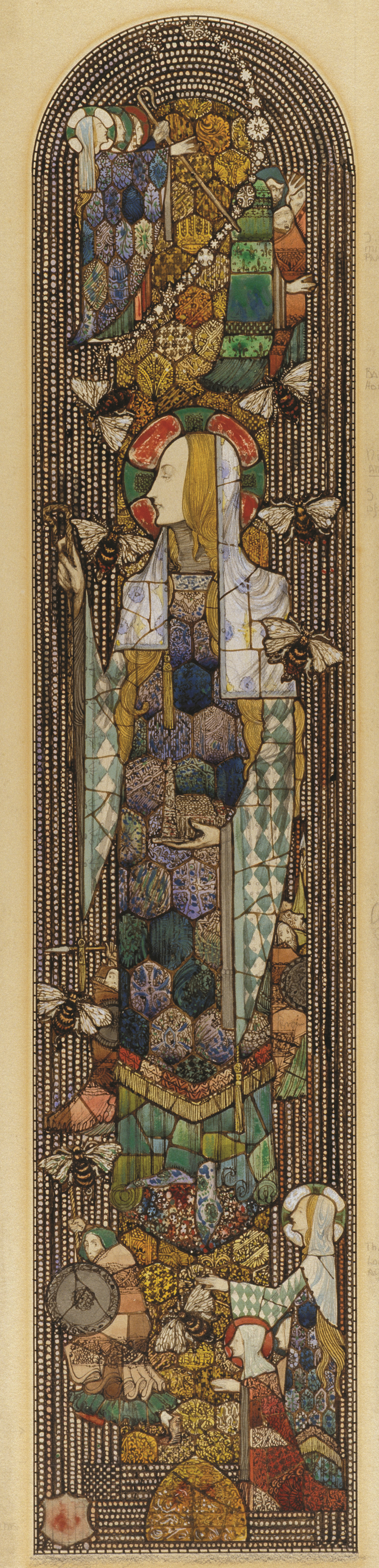
Harry Clarke's design drawing for the Saint Gobnait window, Honan Chapel, Cork, (1914)

One story tells of how she drove off a brigand by sending a swarm of bees after him and making him restore the cattle he had stolen.

Some traditions associate her with the legendary saint Latiaran, the patron of a sacred well in Cullen, making them two of three sisters.

== Well ==
St Gobnait's well is situated to the north of Ballyagran in a high field to the left of the road to Castletown. Rounds were made and a pattern was held on 11 February until around 1870. The well has now dried up but the site is still known. It is said that a white stag could sometimes be seen at the well. There is also a well in Dún Chaoin County Kerry and is visited on 11 February every year by locals.

== Veneration and depictions in art ==
In 1601 Pope Clement VIII granted a special indulgence to those who, on Gobnait's day, visited the parish church, went to Confession and Communion and prayed for peace among 'Christian princes', expulsion of heresy and the exaltation of the church. Gobnait was originally a patron of ironworkers. Excavation at the church in Ballyvourney yielded considerable evidence of ironworking on the site.

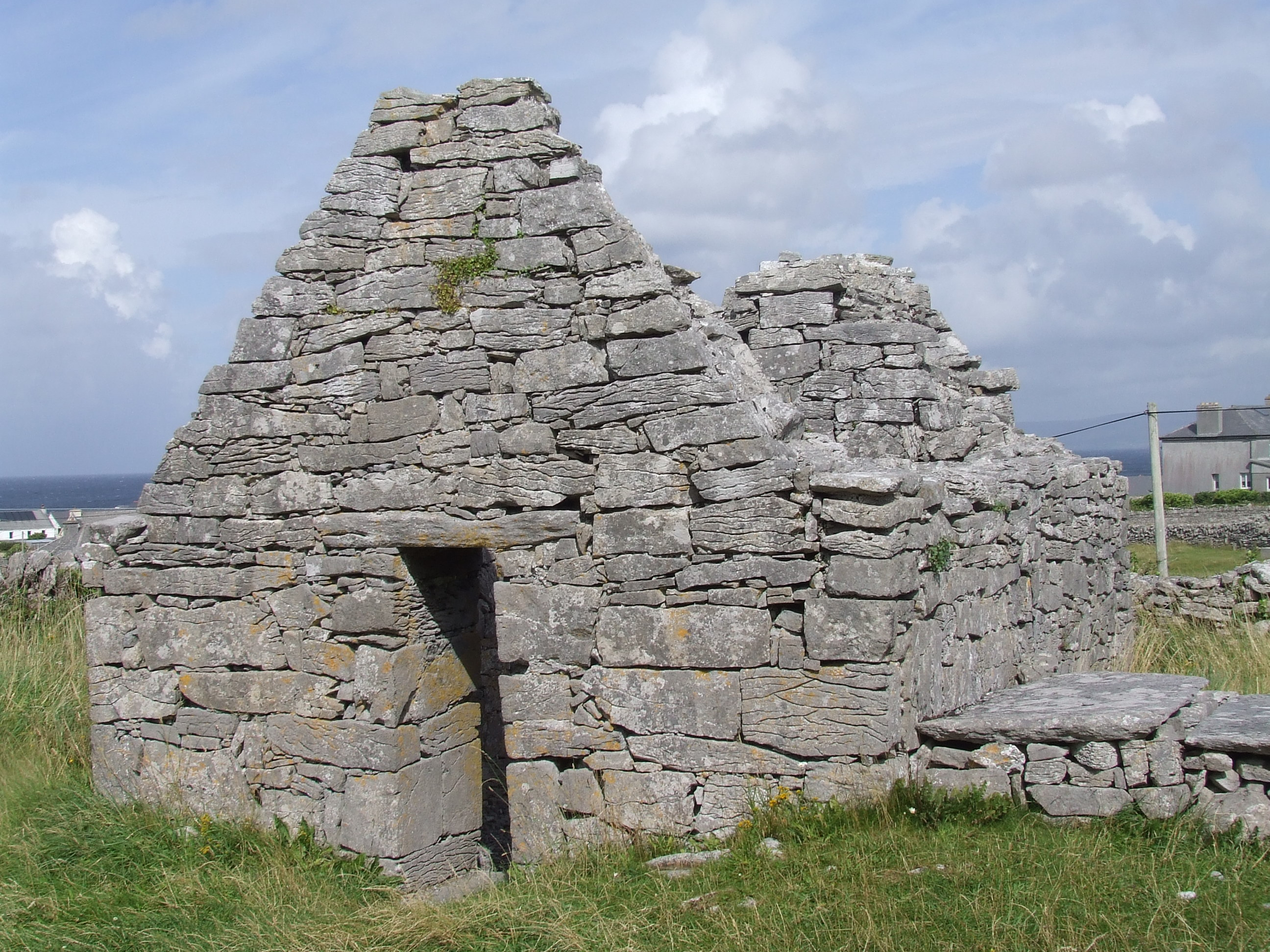
St. Gobnet's Church, Inisheer; although the church is 11th century, it claims to derive from a foundation by Gobnait and to contain the remains of her beehive hut.

The saint is still locally venerated today, and is among a group of Irish saints whose feast day has been given national rather than just local recognition. The main centres of devotion to Gobnait are Inis Oírr (Aran Islands), Dún Chaoin in West Kerry and Balleyvourney near the Cork / Kerry border. She is depicted on a stained glass window at Honan Chapel in Cork, which was made by artist Harry Clarke in 1916. The bottom of the design features the story of Gobnait driving off the brigand.

Former churches dedicated to Gobnait are commemorated in townlands and other places named Kilgobnet (Irish: Cill Ghobnait "church of Gobnait"): in counties Kerry (at Dunquin and at Kilgobnet near Milltown), Waterford (near Dungarvan), Limerick (in Ballyagran), and Cork (near Glantane, Dripsey, and Clondrohid).
