= Redmond Roche =

Irish MP (c. 1610 – after 1654)

- Born: About 1610
- Died: After 1654
- Spouses: 1. Jane Dowdall; 2. Alice Smith
- Children: Jane
- Parent(s): David Roche, Joan Barry

Redmond Roche (c. 1610 – after 1654) was an Irish politician who sat for County Cork in the Parliament of 1640–1649. He was a Protestant during his earlier life but joined the Confederateses in 1642.

== Birth and origins ==
Family tree

Redmond Roche with wife, parents, and other selected relatives. (Note: This family tree is based on genealogies of the Viscounts of Fermoy. Also see the lists of children in the text.)

Eleanor; FitzGerald	Maurice; 6th Viscount d. 1600	Catherine; FitzGerald
David; 7th Viscount; 1573–1635	Joan; Barry
Maurice; 8th Viscount; 1597–1670	Jane; Dowdall d. bef. 1638	Redmond; Roche	Alice; Smith
David; 9th Viscount d. 1703; Naval officer	John; Roche	Jane; Roche	Richard; Waller
Ulick; 10th Viscount d. 1733

Legend

XXX	Subject of the article	XXX	Viscounts; Fermoy

Redmond was born about 1610, (Note: His birth year is constrained by his eldest brother's birth in 1593 plus the gestations of his elder siblings, and the year 1620 as he must have been 21 to stand for election as MP in 1641.) probably at Castletownroche in Munster, Ireland. Redmond was the fifth and youngest son of David Roche and his wife Joan Barry. His father had succeeded in 1600 as the 7th Viscount Fermoy. As son of a viscount, Redmond was entitled to the honorific "The Honourable" from birth. His father's family, the Roches, were Old English and descended from Adam de Rupe who had come to Ireland from Wales with Robert FitzStephen during the Anglo-Norman invasion of Ireland.

Redmond's mother was a daughter of James FitzRichard Barry, 3rd Viscount Buttevant. Redmond's mother's family, the de Barrys, were Old English like his father's. They descended from Philip de Barry, who had come to Ireland from Wales in 1183.

Redmond was one of nine siblings, who are listed in his father's article. Of note are here his eldest brother, Maurice, the future 8th Viscount Fermoy, and his eldest sister, Helen, who would become the second wife of Charles MacCarthy, 1st Viscount Muskerry.

== Marriages ==
Roche married first Jane Dowdall, the third daughter of Sir John Dowdall and his wife Elizabeth Southwell.

Redmond and Jane had one daughter:

- Jane, who married Richard Waller, Esquire, of Dublin.

His first wife died before 1638.

He married secondly, after 1636, Alice Smith, widow of William Wiseman of Bandon (died 1636), daughter of Sir Richard Smith of Ballinatray and his wife Mary Boyle, sister of Richard Boyle, 1st Earl of Cork. Alice's first husband had been MP for Bandonbridge in the Irish Parliament of 1634–1635, the 1st Irish Parliament of King Charles I.

Nothing is known about children he may have had from the second marriage.

It is significant that both wives were Protestants.

== Parliament ==
Roche was elected to the Irish Parliament of 1640–1649, (Note: Also called the "Parliament 1639–1648" as its start date and end date are both affected by the shift in the start of the year from 25 March to 1 January in the calendar reform of 1750. The opening date, the 16 March 1640, was still in 1639 according to the Old Style (O.S.) calendar, in force in Great Britain and Ireland at the time. Similarly, the end date, 30 January 1649 (the execution of Charles I), was still in 1648 according to O.S.) the 2nd Irish Parliament of King Charles I, in a by-election held to replace Donough MacCarty in one of the two seats for County Cork. MacCarty had to vacate his seat in the Commons as he had on 20 February 1641 succeeded as the 2nd Viscount of Muskerry and moved to the House of Lords. Roche contested and won the resulting by-election some time early in 1641.

MacCarty was Roche's nephew by marriage Sir Donough MacCarty, who had been elected as member (MP) for County Cork. MacCarty's father, the 1st Lord Muskerry had in 1599 married Roche's eldest sister Helen as his second wife. Helen was thus MacCarty's stepmother and Roche was his uncle by marriage.

County MPs were then known as knights of the shire. Traditionally they had to be knights and the MacCartys had arranged for Donough to be knighted before his first term in the Irish Parliament of 1634–1635. Roche had never been knighted and therefore became a knight of the shire who was only an esquire. This was already well accepted in the 17th century.

Roche probably sat from May 1641 to June 1642. When he arrived, Thomas Wentworth, 1st Earl of Strafford, the Lord Lieutenant was about to be executed (12 May 1641) or this had just been done. Ireland was ruled (since 10 February 1641) by the joint Lord Justices Sir William Parsons, 1st Baronet of Bellamont and John Borlase.

The parliamentarian records show that at the time Roche lived at Caherduggan Castle, a tower house that stood along the road between Mallow and Doneraile. (Note: The site of the former Caherduggan Castle has been excavated in 2011 by the archaeological firm Rubicon Heritage in advance of the realignment of the R581 between Doneraile and Newtwopothouse in 2013.)

== Irish wars ==
Phelim O'Neill launched the Irish Rebellion of 1641 from the northern province of Ulster in October 1641. Redmond's brother Maurice, Lord Fermoy, was one of the first of the Catholic noblemen of Munster to join the rebellion and was its leader in the early times. Roche initially supported William St Leger and accompanied him in December 1641 on his expedition into County Waterford to repress the rebellion there, but later followed his family into the rebellion despite his links to the Boyles through his second wife. On 22 June 1642 Roche was expelled from parliament for having joined the rebels. Lady Dowdall, his mother in law by his first wife, Jane Dowdall defended Kilfinny Castle in 1642 against the insurgents but had to surrender it on 29 July 1642.

Roche surprised and seized Caherduggan Castle for the insurgents in April 1644.

== Death ==
Redmond Roche died after 1654.

Timeline
As his birth date is uncertain, so are all his ages.
Age	Date	Event
0	1610, about	Born
14–15	1625, 27 Mar	Accession of King Charles I, succeeding King James I
21–22	1632, 12 Jan	Thomas Wentworth, later Earl of Strafford, appointed Lord Deputy of Ireland
24–25	1635, 22 Mar	Eldest brother Maurice succeeded his father as the 8th Viscount. Fermoy
30–31	1641, 20 Feb	Charles MacCarthy, 1st Viscount Muskerry, died in London.
30–31	1641, early	Replaced Donough MacCarty as MP for County Cork
30–31	1641, 12 May	Strafford beheaded
30–31	1641, 23 Oct	Outbreak of the Rebellion
31–32	1642, 22 Jun	Expelled from parliament as a rebel
31–32	1642, 29 Jul	Lady Dowdall surrendered Kilfinny Castle. She was his mother-in-law by his first wife.
33–34	1644, April	Captured Caherduggan Castle.
34–35	1645, 21 Oct	Giovanni Battista Rinuccini, the papal nuncio, landed in Ireland.
35–36	1646, 5 Jun	Battle of Benburb
38–39	1649, 30 Jan	King Charles I beheaded.
38–39	1649, 23 Feb	Giovanni Battista Rinuccini, the papal nuncio, left Ireland
38–39	1649, 15 Aug	Oliver Cromwell landed in Dublin
40–41	1651, 3 Sep	Battle of Worcester
41–42	1652, 12 May	Fall of Galway
43–44	1654, after	Died

== Notes and references ==
=== Sources ===
- Asch, Ronald G. (2004). "Wentworth, Thomas, first earl of Strafford (1593–1641)". In Matthew, Colin; Harrison, Brian (eds.). Oxford Dictionary of National Biography. Vol. 56. New York: Oxford University Press. pp. 142–157. ISBN 0-19-861408-X.
- Atkinson, Charles Francis (1911). "Great Rebellion" . In Chisholm, Hugh (ed.). Encyclopædia Britannica. Vol. 12 (11th ed.). Cambridge University Press. pp. 403–421.
- Burke, Bernard (1883). A Genealogical History of the Dormant, Abeyant, Forfeited and Extinct Peerages of the British Empire (New ed.). London: Harrison. OCLC 499232768. – (for MacCarty and Roche)
- Burke, Sir Bernard (1898). A Genealogical and Heraldic History of the Landed Gentry of Great Britain and Ireland. Vol. II (9th ed.). London: Harrison. OCLC 669078411. – Great Britain: Pack to Yuille; Ireland: Adams to Young (for Smyth of Ballynatray)
- Coffey, Diarmid (1914). O'Neill and Ormond – A Chapter of Irish History. Dublin: Maunsel & Company. OCLC 906164979.
- Cusack, Mary Frances (1871). A Compendium of Irish History. Boston: Patrick Donahoe. OCLC 873009963.
- Dunlop, Robert (1895). "Parsons, Sir William (1570? – 1650)". In Lee, Sidney (ed.). Dictionary of National Biography. Vol. XLIII. London: Smith, Elder, & Co. pp. 419–421. OCLC 8544105.
- Dunlop, Robert (1897). "Roche, David, Viscount Fermoy (1573?–635)". In Lee, Sidney (ed.). Dictionary of National Biography. Vol. IL. London: Smith, Elder, & Co. p. 68. OCLC 8544105.
- Dunlop, Robert; Cunningham, Bernadette (2004). "Roche, David, seventh viscount Roche of Fermoy (1573?–1635)". In Matthew, Colin; Harrison, Brian (eds.). Oxford Dictionary of National Biography. Vol. 47. New York: Oxford University Press. pp. 460–461. ISBN 0-19-861397-0.
- Fryde, Edmund Boleslaw; Greenway, D. E.; Porter, S.; Roy, I., eds. (1986). Handbook of British Chronology. Royal Historical Society Guides and Handbooks, No. 2 (3rd ed.). London: Offices of the Royal Historical Society. ISBN 0-86193-106-8. – (for timeline)
- Furnivall, Frederick J. (1896). The English Conquest of Ireland A.D. 1166–1185. London: Kegan Paul, Trench, Trübner & Co. OCLC 697742469.
- Gerard, John (1913). "Chronology, General". In Herbermann, Charles George (ed.). Catholic Encyclopedia. Vol. III. New York: The Encyclopedia Press. pp. 738–742. OCLC 1157968788.
- Harris, William Torrey (1930). Webster's New International Dictionary of the English Language. Springfield, Massachusetts: G. & C. Merriam Company. OCLC 1158283506.
- House of Commons (1878). Return. Members of Parliament – Part II. Parliaments of Great Britain, 1705–1796. Parliaments of the United Kingdom, 1801–1874. Parliaments and Conventions of the Estates of Scotland, 1357–1707. Parliaments of Ireland, 1599–1800. London: His/Her Majesty's Stationery Office. OCLC 13112546.
- Lodge, John (1789). Archdall, Mervyn (ed.). The Peerage of Ireland or, A Genealogical History of the Present Nobility of that Kingdom. Vol. VI. Dublin: James Moore. OCLC 264906028. – Viscounts, barons
- McGrath, Brid (1997). "Redmond Roche Cork County". A Biographical Dictionary of the Membership of the Irish House of Commons 1640 to 1641 (Ph.D.). Vol. 1. Dublin: Trinity College. pp. 257–258. – Parliaments & Biographies (PDF downloadable from given URL)
- Nicholl, John (September 2016). "Some leather finds from Caherduggan Castle, Doneraile, Co. Cork. Ireland". Newsletter of the Archaeological Leather Group (44).
- Ohlmeyer, Jane H. (2004). "MacCarthy, Donough, first earl of Clancarty (1594–1665)". In Matthew, Colin; Harrison, Brian (eds.). Oxford Dictionary of National Biography. Vol. 35. New York: Oxford University Press. pp. 107–108. ISBN 0-19-861385-7.
- Ó Siochrú, Micheál (October 2009). McGuire, James; Quinn, James (eds.). "MacCarthy, Donough". Dictionary of Irish Biography.
- O'Sullivan, Mary Donovan (1983) [1st pub. 1942]. Old Galloway: the history of a Norman colony in Ireland. Galway: Kennys Bookshops and Art Galleries. ISBN 978-0-906312-21-6.
- Perceval-Maxwell, Michael (1994). The Outbreak of the Irish Rebellion of 1641. Montreal: McGill-Queen's University Press. ISBN 0-7735-1157-1. – (Preview)
- Warner, Ferdinand (1768). History of the Rebellion and Civil-War in Ireland. Vol. I. Dublin: James William. OCLC 82770539. – 1641 to 1643

Parliament of Ireland
Preceded by Donough MacCarty; Sir William St Leger	Member of Parliament for County Cork; 1641–1642; With: Sir William St Leger	Succeeded by Sir William St Leger
