= Charles MacCarthy, 1st Viscount Muskerry =

Irish lord (died 1641)

Charles MacCarthy
- Viscount Muskerry
- Tenure: 1628–1641
- Predecessor: Cormac, 16th Lord of Muskerry
- Successor: Donough, 1st Earl of Clancarty
- Born: c. 1570
- Died: 20 February 1641; London
- Buried: Westminster Abbey
- Spouses: 1. Margaret O'Brien; 2. Ellen Roche
- Issue Detail: Donough & others
- Father: Cormac, 16th Lord of Muskerry
- Mother: Mary Butler

Sir Charles MacCarthy, 1st Viscount of Muskerry (died 1641), also called Cormac Oge, especially in Irish, was from a family of Irish chieftains who were the Lords of Muskerry, related to the Old English through maternal lines. He became the 17th Lord of Muskerry upon his father's death in 1616. He acquired a noble title under English law, becoming 1st Viscount Muskerry and 1st Baron Blarney under letters patent. He sat in the House of Lords in both Irish parliaments of King Charles I. He opposed Strafford, the king's viceroy in Ireland, and in 1641 contributed to his demise by submitting grievances to the king in London. Muskerry died during this mission and was buried in Westminster Abbey.

== Birth and origins ==
Family tree

Charles MacCarthy with his two wives, his parents, and other selected relatives. (Note: This family tree is based on a two graphic trees and on written genealogies of the Earls of Clancarty, the MacCarthy of Muskerry family, the Earls of Thomond, and the Earls of Ormond. Also see the list of children in the text.)

Dermot; 13th Lord; 1501–1570 | Theobald; 1st Baron Cahir d. 1596
Donogh; O'Brien; 4th Earl d. 1624 | Cormac; MacDermot; 16th Lord; 1552–1616 | Mary; Butler | David Roche; 7th Viscount; Fermoy; 1573–1635
Margaret; O'Brien m. 1590 | Charles; 1st Viscount d. 1641 | Ellen; Roche | Donal; MacCarthy; Reagh; Kilbrittain
Donough; 1st Earl; Clancarty; 1594–1665 | Eleanor; Butler; 1612–1682 | Charles; Kilbrittain | Eleanor; MacCarthy m. 1636
Charles; Viscount; Muskerry** c. 1633 – 1665 d.v.p.* | Callaghan; 3rd Earl c. 1638 – 1676 | Justin; Viscount; Mountcashel c. 1643 – 1694

Legend

| XXX | Subject of the article | XXX | Lords & Viscounts Muskerry, & Earls of Clancarty |

| XXX | Barons; Cahir | XXX | Earls of Thomond | XXX | Viscounts; Fermoy |

*d.v.p. = predeceased his father (decessit vita patris)
**courtesy title

Charles, also called Cormac, was probably born in the 1570s in County Cork, southern Ireland. (Note: Burke (1866) and Cokayne (1893) mention Charles in their genealogies but omit his birth date. Cronnelly (1865) and O'Hart (1892) give 1564, but also state that his father was born in 1552, which would mean his father was only 12 years older. The entry for Charles MacCarty in the Alumni Oxonienses tells us that this student was 14 on 2 February 1602, meaning that he was most likely born in 1587, too late to marry in about 1590 and to have a son in 1594.) Living in a bilingual context, he had two names, Charles in English and Cormac in Irish. He was the eldest son of Cormac MacDermot MacCarthy and his wife Mary Butler. As his father's name also was Cormac, he was distinguished as "Cormac oge", the younger, (Note: There are many Cormacs in MacCarthy's near family, his father (Cormac MacDermot), he himself (Cormac Oge), his eldest (disabled) son, and his grandson. He carried the generational suffix "oge", (or "óg"; cf. Irish óg, young, or "óige", younger). Many examples for the use of og, óg, oge, or óge can be given in this sense and context. The form with the final e seems to be rarer but occurs in the names Henry O'Neill, Hugh Oge O'Neill, Hugh Oge MacMahon, John Óge Burke, John Óge Lynch, Richard Óge Martyn and William Óge Martyn. With progressive anglicisation at least two of these Cormacs were also called Charles: he himself and his eldest grandson.) whereas his father usually included the patronymic "MacDermot" (son of Dermot) in his name. MacDermot (Charles's father) was the 16th Lord of Muskerry. (Note: According to an alternative regnal numbering scheme, MacCarthy's father was numbered the 17th Lord of Muskerry.) MacDermot had conformed to the established religion, in other words: become a Protestant, by adhering to the Church of Ireland. Charles's father's family were the MacCarthys of Muskerry, a Gaelic Irish dynasty that had branched from the MacCarthy-Mor line in the 14th century when a younger son received Muskerry as appanage.

Charles's mother was the second daughter of Theobald Butler, 1st Baron Cahir. His mother's family was a cadet branch of the Butler Dynasty. The Butlers were Old English and descended from Theobald Walter, who had been appointed chief butler of Ireland by King Henry II in 1177. Charles was one of four siblings. see the list in his father's article.

MacCarthy seems to have been a Protestant in his youth but later became Catholic. (Note: According to O'Hart, Charles MacDermot MacCarthy (Donough's father) studied at Oxford University. Indeed, a Charles MacCarty matriculated on 2 February 1602, aged 14, at Broadgates Hall, a precursor of Pembroke College. However, this date and age make his birth year 1587 or 1588, too late to marry in 1590 and have a son in 1594. Whoever this student was, he must have been a Protestant as Catholics were not accepted at Oxford University in his time.)

== First marriage and children ==
MacCarthy married Margaret O'Brien in about 1590. She was a daughter of Donogh O'Brien, 4th Earl of Thomond, a Protestant. Her family, the O'Briens, were another Gaelic Irish dynasty, descending, in her case, from Brian Boru, a medieval high king of Ireland.

Charles and Margaret had two sons:

1. Cormac, disabled, died young predeceasing his father
2. Donough (1594–1665), 1st earl of Clancarty and 2nd viscount of Muskerry

—and five daughters (in an unordered list as their birth order is poorly known): (Note: Burke (1866) and Lainé (1836) each list only three sisters. Lodge (1789) indicates that Mary is the 2nd daughter and mentions a fifth, Helen, but omits the name of the mother. Helen could be from his father's second marriage.)

- Julia, also called Sheela (d. 1633), married Sir Valentine Browne, 1st Baronet of Molahiffe, County Kerry, as his 2nd wife
- Mary, the 2nd daughter, married 1st Sir Valentine Browne, 2nd Baronet of Molahiffe, and had Valentine Browne, 1st Viscount Kenmare as son
- Elena, married John Power and was ancestress of Frances Power, who married Richard Trench and was mother of William Trench, 1st Earl of Clancarty of the 2nd creation
- Eleanor, married in 1636 Charles MacCarthy Reagh, son of Donal MacCarthy Reagh; they had three sons: Finin, Donal, Donogh, and a daughter, Ellen, who married John de Courcy, 21st Baron Kingsale
- Helen, the 5th daughter, married Colonel Edmund Fitzmaurice, eldest son of the second marriage of Thomas Fitzmaurice, 18th Baron Kerry

== Tyrone's Rebellion ==
MacDermot (MacCarthy's father) fought in Tyrone's Rebellion, also called the Nine Years' War, which lasted from 1593 to 1603. He sided with the English and fought the Spanish during the Siege of Kinsale in 1601. Most of MacCarthy's life fell into the subsequent period of almost 40 years of peace in southern Ireland from the Treaty of Mellifont, which ended the Nine Years' War, to the Irish Rebellion of 1641.

== Lord and Viscount ==
In 1616 MacCarthy succeeded his father as the 17th Lord of Muskerry. Lord Deputy Oliver St John knighted him in 1620. In 1628 Charles I, King of Ireland, England, and Scotland, created him Baron Blarney and Viscount Muskerry. The titles were probably bought. They had a special remainder that designated his second son Donough as successor, excluding his eldest son Cormac, who was alive at the time but disabled.

This is the first creation of the title Muskerry. The title would become extinct with the attainder of the 4th earl in 1691 but be resurrected in the 2nd creation as Baron Muskerry in favour of Robert Tilson Deane, 1st Baron Muskerry in 1781.

== Parliament of 1634–1635 ==
Muskerry, as he was now, sat in the House of Lords during the two Irish parliaments of King Charles I. The Irish Parliament of 1634–1635 was opened on 14 July 1634 by the new Lord Deputy of Ireland, Thomas Wentworth (the future Lord Strafford), who had taken office in July 1633. Muskerry took his seat immediately at the opening. Wentworth dissolved parliament on 18 April 1635.

== Second marriage ==
When his first wife died, Muskerry remarried in or after 1636 to Ellen Roche, eldest daughter of David Roche, 7th Viscount Fermoy, a zealous Catholic. It was also her second marriage. She was the widow of Donal MacCarthy Reagh of Kilbrittain, Prince of Carbery in the Gaelic tradition, with whom she had had a son called Charles MacCarthy Reagh of Kilbrittain, who had in 1636 before his father's death, married Eleanor, one of Muskerry's daughters from his first marriage. Muskerry thus married the mother of one of his sons-in-law. (Note: Cokayne (1936) and Ohlmeyer (2004) propose 1599 or earlier for the date of Muskerry's 2nd marriage. This date is too near (26 years) to his father-in-law's birth in 1573: not enough time for his father-in-law to grow up, marry, have a daughter who marries and has a son who marries Muskerry's daughter Eleanor, then becomes a widow, and marries Muskerry as her 2nd husband.)

Muskerry was a Catholic during his later life. He probably converted after the death of his first wife, whose father had been a Protestant.

== Parliament of 1640–1649 ==
The Irish Parliament of 1640–1649 (Note: Also called the "Parliament of 1639–1648" as its start date and end date are both affected by the shift in the start of the year from 25 March to 1 January in the calendar reform of 1750. The opening date, the 16 March 1640, was still in 1639 according to the Old Style (O.S.) calendar, in force in Great Britain and Ireland at the time. Similarly, the end date, 30 January 1649 (the execution of Charles I), was still in 1648 according to O.S.) was opened on 16 March 1640 by Christopher Wandesford, whom Strafford, as Wentworth was now called, had appointed lord deputy after he himself had been promoted lord lieutenant. Strafford arrived two days later. In its first session the parliament unanimously voted four subsidies of £45,000 (about £9,500,000 in 2025) to raise an Irish army of 9000 for use by the King against the Scots in the Second Bishops' War. While attending parliament, Muskerry probably stayed at his new townhouse built about that time on Dublin's College Green.

On 3 April 1640 Strafford left Ireland. Wandesford stood in for him. The Commons formed a commission of grievances that gathered evidence for Strafford's abuse of power. They sent a delegation to Westminster where they submitted the grievances to the King. This delegation included Muskerry's son Donough.

Unlike the Commons, the Lords had not acted on grievances during the third parliamentary session, but afterwards some of them decided to send Lords Muskerry, Gormanston, Dillon, and Kilmallock to London to submit their grievances to the King. Parliament met again on 26 January 1641. Lord Deputy Wandesford had died on 3 December 1640, and the Irish government devolved to Lords Justices, first Robert Dillon and Parsons, but in February 1641 Borlase replaced Roscommon.

The House of Lords recognised its members who had gone to London as constituting one of its committees and excused their absence. On 18 February 1641 the lords' grievances were written up in 18 articles. The lords complained that Strafford had overtaxed them.

== Death and timeline ==
Muskerry died on 20 February 1641 in London during his parliamentary mission. He was buried in Westminster Abbey. (Note: Sources agree that the 1st Viscount Muskerry died in London and was buried in Westminster Abbey. Cokayne states that he died on 20 February 1640 and was buried on 27 May. The Abbey's registers record the burial of Viscount Musgrove from Ireland on 27 May 1640. This Musgrove has been identified with Muskerry. The deformation is not too far-fetched as his name has also been deformed to Musgrave. However, parliamentary records show that his son and heir Donough MacCarty served as MP in the Irish House of Commons in March 1640. Muskerry must have been alive and one of the Lords at that time. Cokayne must be wrong. Muskerry died later than February 1640.) Muskerry was succeeded by his second son Donough. As the ailing elder brother had died some time before, the title's special remainder did not need to be invoked. His widow married Thomas, 4th son of Thomas Fitzmaurice, 18th Baron Kerry.

Timeline
As his birth date is uncertain, so are all his ages. Italics for historical background.
| Age | Date | Event |
| 0 | 1564 | Born according to O'Hart. |
| 0 | About 1570 | Born |
| 19–20 | About 1590 | Married Margaret O'Brien |
| 23–24 | 1594 | Son Donough born |
| 30–31 | 22 Sep 1601 | The Spanish landed at Kinsale |
| 32–33 | 24 Mar 1603 | Accession of James I, succeeding Elizabeth I |
| 32–33 | 30 Mar 1603 | Treaty of Mellifont ended Tyrone's Rebellion. |
| 44–45 | 2 Jul 1615 | Oliver St John, appointed lord deputy of Ireland |
| 45–46 | 23 Feb 1616 | Succeeded his father as 17th Lord of Muskerry |
| 54–55 | 27 Mar 1625 | Accession of Charles I, succeeding James I |
| 57–58 | 15 Nov 1628 | Created Baron Blarney and Viscount Muskerry |
| 61–62 | 12 Jan 1632 | Thomas Wentworth, later Earl of Stafford, appointed lord deputy of Ireland |
| 65–66 | 1636 | 2nd wife's 1st husband, Donal MacCarthy Reagh of Kilbrittain, died. |
| 70–71 | 20 Feb 1641 | Died in London |

== Notes and references ==
=== Sources ===
- Asch, Ronald G. (2004). "Wentworth, Thomas, first earl of Strafford (1593–1641)". In Matthew, Colin; Harrison, Brian (eds.). Oxford Dictionary of National Biography. Vol. 56. New York: Oxford University Press. pp. 142–157. ISBN 0-19-861408-X.
- Augusteijn, Joost (2004). "Mellifont, treaty of". In Connolly, Sean Joseph (ed.). The Oxford Companion to Irish History (2nd ed.). Oxford: Oxford University Press. pp. 373–374. ISBN 0-19-280501-0.
- Bagwell, Richard (1909). Ireland under the Stuarts and under the Interregnum. Vol. I. London: Longmans, Green, and Co. OCLC 458582656. – 1603 to 1642
- Buckley, James (1898). "The battle of Liscarroll, 1642" (PDF). Journal of the Cork Historical and Archaeological Society. 4 (38): 83–100.
- Burke, Bernard (1866). A Genealogical History of the Dormant, Abeyant, Forfeited and Extinct Peerages of the British Empire (New ed.). London: Harrison. OCLC 11501348. – (for MacCarty & Roche)
- Burke, Bernard; Burke, Ashworth Peter (1915). A Genealogical and Heraldic History of the Peerage and Baronetage, the Privy Council, Knightage and Companionage (77th ed.). London: Harrison. OCLC 1155471554. – (for Ormond)
- Butler, William F. T. (1904). "The Barony of Carbery" (PDF). Journal of the Cork Historical and Archaeological Society. 10 (61): 1–10. – West Carbery
- Butler, William F. T. (1925). Gleanings from Irish History. London: Longmans, Green and Co. OCLC 557681240.
- Carte, Thomas (1851a) [1st pub. 1736]. The Life of James Duke of Ormond. Vol. I (New ed.). Oxford: Oxford University Press. OCLC 1086656347. – 1613 to 1641
- Carte, Thomas (1851b) [1st pub. 1736]. The Life of James Duke of Ormond. Vol. III (New ed.). Oxford: Oxford University Press. OCLC 1086656347. – 1643 to 1660
- Chester, Joseph Lemuel (1876). Registers of Westminster Abbey. London: Private Edition. OCLC 1140248. – Marriages, baptisms and burials from about 1660 to 1875
- Coghlan, Ronan; Grehan, Ida; Joyce, P. W. (1989). Book of Irish Names – First, Family, and Placenames. New York: Sterling Publisher Co., Inc. ISBN 0-8069-6944-X.
- Cokayne, George Edward (1892). Complete Peerage of England, Scotland, Ireland, Great Britain and the United Kingdom, Extant, Extinct, or Dormant. Vol. IV (1st ed.). London: George Bell and Sons. OCLC 1180828941. – G to K (for Valentine Brown, Earl of Kenmare)
- Cokayne, George Edward (1893). Complete peerage of England, Scotland, Ireland, Great Britain and the United Kingdom, extant, extinct, or dormant. Vol. V (1st ed.). London: George Bell and Sons. OCLC 1180836840. – L to M (for Muskerry)
- Cokayne, George Edward (1896). Complete Peerage of England, Scotland, Ireland, Great Britain and the United Kingdom, Extant, Extinct, or Dormant. Vol. VII (1st ed.). London: George Bell and Sons. OCLC 1180891114. – S to T (for Strafford and Thomond)
- Cokayne, George Edward (1900). Complete Baronetage, 1611 to 1800. Vol. I (1st ed.). Exeter: William Pollard & Co. OCLC 866278985. – 1611 to 1625 (for Browne)
- Cokayne, George Edward (1913). Gibbs, Vicary (ed.). The complete peerage of England, Scotland, Ireland, Great Britain and the United Kingdom, extant, extinct, or dormant. Vol. III (2nd ed.). London: St Catherine Press. OCLC 228661424. – Canonteign to Cutts (for Clancarty)
- Cokayne, George Edward (1936). Doubleday, H. A (ed.). The complete peerage of England, Scotland, Ireland, Great Britain and the United Kingdom, extant, extinct, or dormant. Vol. IX (2nd ed.). London: St Catherine Press. – Moels to Nuneham
- Cronnelly, Richard Francis (1865). Irish Family History. Being an Historical and Genealogical Account of the Gaedhals from the Earliest Period to the Present Time; Compiled from Authentic Sources. Vol. I. Dublin: N. H. Tallon and Company. – (Preview)
- Cunningham, Bernadette (October 2009). "O'Brien, Donough". Dictionary of Irish Biography.
- Debrett, John (1828). Peerage of the United Kingdom of Great Britain and Ireland. Vol. II (17th ed.). London: F. C. and J. Rivington. OCLC 54499602. – Scotland and Ireland
- Dunlop, Robert (1895). "Parsons, Sir William (1570? – 1650)". In Lee, Sidney (ed.). Dictionary of National Biography. Vol. XLIII. London: Smith, Elder, & Co. pp. 419–421. OCLC 8544105.
- Dunlop, Robert; Cunningham, Bernadette (2004). "Roche, David, seventh viscount Roche of Fermoy (1573?–1635)". In Matthew, Colin; Harrison, Brian (eds.). Oxford Dictionary of National Biography. Vol. 47. New York: Oxford University Press. pp. 460–461. ISBN 0-19-861397-0.
- Firth, Charles Harding (1903). "Royalist and Cromwellian Armies in Flanders (1657–1662)". Transactions of the Royal Historical Society. New Series. 17: 67–119. doi:10.2307/3678138. JSTOR 3678138. S2CID 163012566.
- Fryde, Edmund Boleslaw; Greenway, D. E.; Porter, S.; Roy, I., eds. (1986). Handbook of British Chronology. Royal Historical Society Guides and Handbooks, No. 2 (3rd ed.). London: Offices of the Royal Historical Society. ISBN 0-86193-106-8. – (for timeline)
- Gardiner, Samuel Rawson (1899). "Wentworth, Thomas, first Earl of Strafford (1593–1641)". In Lee, Sidney (ed.). Dictionary of National Biography. Vol. LX. London: Smith, Elder, & Co. pp. 268–283. OCLC 8544105.
- G. E. C. (1893). Complete Peerage of England, Scotland, Ireland, Great Britain and the United Kingdom, Extant, Extinct, or Dormant. Vol. V (1st ed.). London: George Bell and Sons. OCLC 1180836840. – L to M
- G. E. C. (1896). Complete Peerage of England, Scotland, Ireland, Great Britain and the United Kingdom, Extant, Extinct, or Dormant. Vol. VII (1st ed.). London: George Bell and Sons. OCLC 1180891114. – S to T (for Strafford and Thomond)
- G. E. C. (1913). Gibbs, Vicary (ed.). The Complete Peerage of England, Scotland, Ireland, Great Britain and the United Kingdom, Extant, Extinct, or Dormant. Vol. III (2nd ed.). London: The St Catherine Press. OCLC 228661424. – Canonteign to Cutts
- G. E. C. (1936). Doubleday, Herbert Arthur (ed.). The Complete Peerage or a History of the House of Lords and all its Members from the Earliest Times. Vol. IX (2nd ed.). London: The St Catherine Press. OCLC 228661424. – Moels to Nuneham (Snippet view)
- Gerard, John (1913). "Chronology, General". In Herbermann, Charles George (ed.). Catholic Encyclopedia. Vol. III. New York: The Encyclopedia Press. pp. 738–742. OCLC 1157968788.
- Gibson, Charles Bernard (1861). The History of the County and City of Cork. Vol. I. London: Thomas C. Newby. OCLC 1046580159. – to 1603
- Gillespie, Raymond (2006). Seventeenth-Century Ireland: Making Ireland Modern. Dublin: Gill & MacMillan. ISBN 978-0-7171-3946-0.
- House of Commons (1878). Return. Members of Parliament – Part II. Parliaments of Great Britain, 1705–1796. Parliaments of the United Kingdom, 1801–1874. Parliaments and Conventions of the Estates of Scotland, 1357–1707. Parliaments of Ireland, 1599–1800. London: His/Her Majesty's Stationery Office. OCLC 13112546.
- House of Lords (1779). Journals of the House of Lords (PDF). Vol. I. Dublin: William Sleater. OCLC 35009219. – 1634 to 1699
- Hunter-Blair, D. O. (1913). "Oxford, University of". In Herbermann, Charles George (ed.). Catholic Encyclopedia. Vol. XI. New York: The Encyclopedia Press. p. 365. OCLC 1157968788.
- Joyce, Patrick Weston (1903). A Concise History of Ireland from the Earliest Times to 1837 (12th ed.). Dublin: M. H. Gill & Son. OCLC 815623752.
- Kearney, Hugh F. (1959). Strafford in Ireland 1633–1641 – a Study in Absolutism. Manchester: Manchester University Press. OCLC 857142293.
- Lainé, P. Louis (1836). "Mac-Carthy". Archives généalogiques et historiques de la noblesse de France [Genealogical and Historical Archives of the Nobility of France] (in French). Vol. Tome cinquième. Paris: Imprimerie de Bethune et Plon. pp. 1–102. OCLC 865941166.
- Lenihan, Pádraig (2008). Consolidating Conquest: Ireland 1603–1727. London: Routledge. ISBN 978-0-582-77217-5. – (Preview)
- Lodge, John (1789a). Archdall, Mervyn (ed.). The Peerage of Ireland or, A Genealogical History of the Present Nobility of that Kingdom. Vol. II. Dublin: James Moore. OCLC 264906028. – Earls (for Kerry)
- Lodge, John (1789b). Archdall, Mervyn (ed.). The Peerage of Ireland or, A Genealogical History of the Present Nobility of that Kingdom. Vol. VII. Dublin: James Moore. OCLC 264906028. – Barons (under Aylmer)
- MacMathúna, Séamus; Ó Corrain, Ailbhe (1995). Irish Dictionary. Glasgow: Collins Gem. ISBN 0-00-470753-2.
- Mahaffy, John Pentland (1891). "From the Caroline Reform to the Settlement of William III". In Wright, Edward Perceval (ed.). The Book of Trinity College, Dublin 1591 1891. Belfast: Marcus Ward & Co.
- Matheson, Robert E. (1901). Varieties and Synonymes of Surnames and Christian Names in Ireland. Dublin: His/Her Majesty's Stationery Office. OCLC 1158195042.
- McCarthy, Samuel Trant (1913). "The Clann Carthaigh (continued)". Kerry Archaeological Magazine. 2 (10): 53–74. doi:10.2307/30059665. JSTOR 30059665.
- McCarthy, Samuel Trant (1922). The MacCarthys of Munster. Dundalk: The Dundalgan Press. OCLC 1157128759.
- Moody, Theodore William; Martin, F. X.; Byrne, Francis John, eds. (1984). A New History of Ireland. Vol. IX:Maps, Genealogies, Lists. Oxford: Oxford University Press. ISBN 0-19-821745-5.
- Morgan, Hiram (2004). "rising of 1641". In Connolly, Sean Joseph (ed.). The Oxford Companion to Irish History (2nd ed.). Oxford: Oxford University Press. pp. 513–514. ISBN 0-19-280501-0.
- Mountmorres, Hervey Redmond Morres, Viscount (1792). The History of the Principal Transactions of the Irish Parliament from the Year 1634 to 1666. Vol. II. London: T. Cadell. OCLC 843863159. – House of Commons
- Ó Cuív, Brian (1976). "Chapter XX: The Irish Language in the Early Modern Period". In Moody, Theodore William; Martin, F. X.; Byrne, Francis John (eds.). A New History of Ireland. Vol. III. Oxford: Oxford University Press. pp. 509–545. ISBN 978-0-1982-0242-4.
- O'Hart, John (1892). Irish Pedigrees: Or, the Origin and Stem of the Irish Nation. Vol. I (5th ed.). Dublin: James Duffy & Co. OCLC 7239210. – Irish stem
- Ó Siochrú, Micheál (October 2009a). "MacCarthy, Donough". Dictionary of Irish Biography.
- Ó Siochrú, Micheál (October 2009b). "Roche, David". Dictionary of Irish Biography.
- Ohlmeyer, Jane H. (1996). "Chapter 8: The Wars of Religion, 1603–1660". In Bartlett, Thomas; Jeffery, Keith (eds.). A Military History of Ireland. Cambridge: Cambridge University Press. pp. 160–187. ISBN 0-521-41599-3.
- Ohlmeyer, Jane H. (2004). "MacCarthy, Donough, first earl of Clancarty (1594–1665)". In Matthew, Colin; Harrison, Brian (eds.). Oxford Dictionary of National Biography. Vol. 35. New York: Oxford University Press. pp. 107–108. ISBN 0-19-861385-7.
- Perceval-Maxwell, Michael (1994). The Outbreak of the Irish Rebellion of 1641. Montreal: McGill-Queen's University Press. ISBN 0-7735-1157-1. – (Preview)
- Shaw, William Arthur (1906). The Knights of England: A complete record from the earliest time to the present day of the knights of all the orders of chivalry in England, Scotland, and Ireland, and of knights bachelors, incorporating a complete list of knights bachelors dubbed in Ireland. Vol. II. London: Sherratt & Hughes. – Knights bachelors & Index
- Smith, Charles (1893) [1st pub. 1750]. The Ancient and Present State of the County and City of Cork. Vol. II. Cork: Guy and Co. OCLC 559463963. – History
- Wedgwood, Cicely Veronica (1961). Thomas Wentworth, First Earl of Strafford 1593–1641. A Revaluation. London: Jonathan Cape. OCLC 1068569885.
- Wills, Rev. James (1840). "Cormac M'Carthy, Lord of Muskerry". Lives of illustrious and distinguished Irishmen, from the earliest times to the present period. Vol. II. Dublin: MacGregor, Polson & Co. pp. 171–174.
- Woolrych, Austin (2002). Britain in Revolution. Oxford: Oxford University Press. ISBN 0-19-820081-1.

Peerage of Ireland
| New creation | Viscount Muskerry; 1st creation 1628–1641 | Succeeded by Donough MacCarty |
