= Maurice Roche, 8th Viscount Fermoy =

Irish lord (1593–1670)

Maurice Roche
- Viscount Fermoy
- Tenure: 1635–1670
- Predecessor: David, 7th Viscount Fermoy
- Successor: David Roche, 9th Viscount Roche
- Born: 1597
- Died: 1670 (aged 72–73)
- Spouse: Ellen Power
- Issue Detail: David, John, & others
- Father: David, 7th Viscount Fermoy
- Mother: Joan Barry

Maurice Roche, 8th Viscount Fermoy (1597–1670) was an magnate and soldier in southern Ireland, and a politician of the Irish Catholic Confederation. He joined the rebels in the Irish Rebellion of 1641 in January 1642, early for Munster, by besieging Richard Boyle, 1st Earl of Cork, a Protestant, in Youghal. He fought for the Confederates in the Irish Confederate Wars and sat on three of their Supreme Councils. He fought against the Parliamentarians in the Cromwellian conquest of Ireland and was excluded from pardon at the surrender in 1652. At the restoration of the monarchy in 1660 he recovered his title but not his lands.

== Birth and origins ==
Family tree

Maurice Roche with wife, parents, and other selected relatives. (Note: This family tree is based on genealogies of the Viscounts of Fermoy, and the earls of Clancarty. Also see the lists of siblings and children in the text.)

Eleanor; FitzGerald	Maurice; 6th Viscount d. 1600	Catherine; FitzGerald
David; 7th Viscount; 1573–1635	Joan; Barry
Maurice; 8th Viscount; 1597–1670	Ellen; Power
David; 9th Viscount d. 1681	John; 10th Viscount d. 1694	Catherine; Condon
David; 11th Viscount d. 1703; Naval Officer

Legend

XXX	Subject of the article	XXX	Viscounts; Fermoy

Maurice was born in 1597, probably in Castletownroche, County Cork, Munster, Ireland. He was the eldest son of David Roche, 7th Viscount Fermoy and his wife, Joan Barry. At the time of his birth, his grandfather was the 6th Viscount Fermoy (also counted as the 1st). His father was heir apparent and would succeed as the 7th Viscount in 1600. His father's family, the Roches were Old English and descended from Adam de Rupe who had come to Ireland from Wales with Robert FitzStephen during the Anglo-Norman invasion of Ireland.

Maurice's mother was a daughter of James de Barry, 4th Viscount Buttevant, by his wife Ellen MacCarthy Reagh. His mother's family, the de Barrys, were Old English like his own and descended from Philip de Barry, who had come to Ireland from Wales in 1183.

He was one of nine siblings, which are listed in his father's article. Of note are Redmond Roche, MP for County Cork, and Ellen, who married Charles MacCarthy, 1st Viscount Muskerry as his second wife.

== Marriage and children ==
About 1625 Roche married Ellen (Eleanor), daughter of John Og Power, son and heir of Richard Power, 4th Baron Power of Curraghmore and sister of John Power, 5th Baron Power of Curraghmore.

Maurice and Ellen had two sons:

1. David (died 1681), succeeded as the 9th Viscount but died in London unmarried
2. John, succeeded as the 10th viscount and married Catharine Condon,

—and at least one daughter:

1. Ellen, married William, Lord Castle Connell

== Viscount ==
He succeeded his father as the 8th Viscount Fermoy on 22 March 1635. He is also counted as 3rd Viscount. Lord Fermoy took his seat in the House of Lords of the Parliament 1640–1649 on 26 October 1640.

== Irish wars ==
Ireland suffered 11 years of war from 1641 to 1652, which are usually divided into the Rebellion of 1641, the Confederate Wars, and the Cromwellian Conquest. This eleven years' war in turn formed part of the Wars of the Three Kingdoms, also known as the British Civil Wars.

Phelim O'Neill launched the Rebellion from the northern province of Ulster in October 1641. Fermoy was one of the first in the southern province of Munster to join the rebels and was the leader of the Confederates in Munster in the early times. In January 1642 Fermoy, together with Garret Barry, besieged Richard Boyle, 1st Earl of Cork, the most powerful of the Munster Protestants, in Youghal. The siege was soon relieved from Lismore Castle by troops under his sons-in-law George FitzGerald, 16th Earl of Kildare, and David Barry, 1st Earl of Barrymore. On 2 March 1642 Donough MacCarty, the 2nd Viscount Muskerry, joined the rebellion. (Note: Muskerry changed sides on Ash Wednesday 1642. Calculations with the Easter Calculator of the University of Utrecht or that of the IMCCE show that Ash Wednesday fell on 2 March in 1642.) Muskerry was Fermoy's nephew by marriage as Muskerry's father had married Fermoy's sister Ellen in 1599 as his second wife. In March and April, Muskerry and Fermoy with 4,000 men unsuccessfully besieged William St Leger, the Lord President of Munster, in Cork City. In May and June 1642, Muskerry, Garret Barry, Patrick Purcell of Croagh, and Fermoy attacked Limerick. The town opened its gates willingly, but the Protestants defended King John's Castle in the Siege of Limerick. The castle surrendered on 21 June. Fermoy was among the losers when Murrough O'Brien, 6th Baron of Inchiquin defeated the insurgeants at the Battle of Liscarroll on 3 September 1642.

When the insurgents organized themselves in the Irish Catholic Confederation, Fermoy was elected a member of the first Supreme Council, sitting from November 1642 to May 1643; and was re-elected for the second Supreme Council sitting from May 1643 to November 1643.

He then lost influence but made a come back in the seventh Supreme Council.

== Later life ==
Fermoy was excluded from pardon of life and estate in the Commonwealth's Act of Settlement on 12 August and therefore lost his estates.

At the Stuart Restoration he regained his title but not his estates.

== Death, succession, and timeline ==
Fermoy died on 22 March 1670 and was succeeded by his son David, a naval officier.

Timeline
Age	Date	Event
0	1597	Born
2–3	1600, 24 Oct	Father succeeded as 7th Viscount Fermoy
3–4	1601, 22 Sep	The Spanish landed at Kinsale
5–6	1603, 24 Mar	Accession of King James I, succeeding Queen Elizabeth I
15–16	1613, Mar	Father took his seat in the Parliament of Ireland
27–28	1625, 27 Mar	Accession of King Charles I, succeeding King James I
27–28	1625, about	Married Ellen, daughter of John Power
34–35	1632, 12 Jan	Thomas Wentworth, later Earl of Strafford, appointed Lord Deputy of Ireland
37–38	1635, 22 Mar	Succeeded his father as the 8th Viscount Fermoy
43–44	1641, 12 May	Strafford beheaded
43–44	1641, 23 Oct	Outbreak of the Rebellion
44–45	1642, Jan	Besieged Richard Boyle, 1st Earl of Cork in Youghal.
44–45	1642, 3 Sep	Was among the losers of the Battle of Liscarroll
44–45	1642, Nov	Elected to the 1st Supreme Council of the Irish Catholic Confederation
47–48	1645, 21 Oct	Giovanni Battista Rinuccini, the papal nuncio, landed in Ireland.
48–49	1646, 5 Jun	Battle of Benburb
51–52	1649, 30 Jan	King Charles I beheaded.
51–52	1649, 23 Feb	Giovanni Battista Rinuccini, the papal nuncio, left Ireland
51–52	1649, 15 Aug	Oliver Cromwell landed in Dublin
53–54	1651, 3 Sep	Battle of Worcester
54–55	1652, 12 May	Fall of Galway
60–61	1658, 3 Sep	Oliver Cromwell died.
62–63	1660, 29 May	Restoration of King Charles II
72–73	1670, 22 Mar	Died

== Notes and references ==
=== Sources ===
- Adams, Constance Louisa (1904). Castles of Ireland – Some Fortress Histories and Legends. London: Elliot Stock. OCLC 751487142.
- Asch, Ronald G. (2004). "Wentworth, Thomas, first earl of Strafford (1593–1641)". In Matthew, Colin; Harrison, Brian (eds.). Oxford Dictionary of National Biography. Vol. 56. New York: Oxford University Press. pp. 142–157. ISBN 0-19-861408-X.
- Atkinson, Charles Francis (1910). "Great Rebellion" . In Chisholm, Hugh (ed.). Encyclopædia Britannica. Vol. 12 (11th ed.). Cambridge University Press. pp. 403–421, see page 420. "58. Campaign of Worcester."
- Bagwell, Richard (1895). "O'Brien, Murrough, first Earl of Inchiquin (1614–1674)". In Lee, Sidney (ed.). Dictionary of National Biography. Vol. XLI. New York: MacMillan and Co. pp. 320–327. OCLC 8544105.
- Bagwell, Richard (1909). Ireland under the Stuarts and under the Interregnum. Vol. II. London: Longmans, Green, and Co. OCLC 458582656. – 1642 to 1660
- Burke, Bernard (1866). A Genealogical History of the Dormant, Abeyant, Forfeited and Extinct Peerages of the British Empire (New ed.). London: Harrison. OCLC 11501348. – (for MacCarty and Roche)
- Coffey, Diarmid (1914). O'Neill and Ormond – A Chapter of Irish History. Dublin: Maunsel & Company. OCLC 906164979.
- Cokayne, George Edward (1926). Gibbs, Vicary (ed.). The complete peerage of England, Scotland, Ireland, Great Britain and the United Kingdom, extant, extinct, or dormant. Vol. V (2nd ed.). London: St Catherine Press. OCLC 228661424. – Eardley of Spalding to Goojerat (for Fermoy)
- Cregan, Donal F. (1995). "The Confederate Catholics of Ireland: The Personal of the Confederation, 1642–9". Irish Historical Studies. 29 (116): 490–512. doi:10.1017/S0021121400012256. JSTOR 30006772. S2CID 159935676.
- Cusack, Mary Frances (1871). A Compendium of Irish History. Boston: Patrick Donahoe. OCLC 873009963.
- Dunlop, Robert (1895). "O'Neill, Phelim 1604?–1653". In Lee, Sidney (ed.). Dictionary of National Biography. Vol. XLII. New York: MacMillan and Co. pp. 204–208. OCLC 8544105.
- Dunlop, Robert (1897). "Roche, David, Viscount Fermoy (1573?–635)". In Lee, Sidney (ed.). Dictionary of National Biography. Vol. IL. London: Smith, Elder, & Co. p. 68. OCLC 8544105.
- Dunlop, Robert; Cunningham, Bernadette (2004). "Roche, David, seventh viscount Roche of Fermoy (1573?–1635)". In Matthew, Colin; Harrison, Brian (eds.). Oxford Dictionary of National Biography. Vol. 47. New York: Oxford University Press. pp. 460–461. ISBN 0-19-861397-0.
- Firth, Charles Harding (1888). "Cromwell, Oliver (1599–1658)". In Lee, Sidney (ed.). Dictionary of National Biography. Vol. XIII. New York: MacMillan and Co. pp. 155–186. OCLC 1043016614.
- Firth, Charles Harding; Rait, R. S. (1911). The Acts and Ordinances of the Interregnum. Vol. II. London: His/Her Majesty's Stationery Office. OCLC 271021959.
- Fryde, Edmund Boleslaw; Greenway, D. E.; Porter, S.; Roy, I., eds. (1986). Handbook of British Chronology. Royal Historical Society Guides and Handbooks, No. 2 (3rd ed.). London: Offices of the Royal Historical Society. ISBN 0-86193-106-8. – (for timeline)
- Furnivall, Frederick J. (1896). The English Conquest of Ireland A.D. 1166–1185. London: Kegan Paul, Trench, Trübner & Co. OCLC 697742469.
- House of Lords (1779). Journals of the House of Lords (PDF). Vol. I. Dublin: William Sleater. OCLC 35009219. – 1634 to 1699
- Joyce, Patrick Weston (1903). A Concise History of Ireland from the Earliest Times to 1837 (12th ed.). Dublin: M. H. Gill & Son. OCLC 815623752.
- McGrath, Brid (1997a). "Donough Mc Carthy, (1594–1665) Cork County". A Biographical Dictionary of the Membership of the Irish House of Commons 1640 to 1641 (Ph.D.). Vol. 1. Dublin: Trinity College. pp. 203–204. hdl:2262/77206. – Parliaments & Biographies (PDF downloadable from given URL)
- McGrath, Brid (1997b). "William St. Leger (c1580–1642) Cork County". A Biographical Dictionary of the Membership of the Irish House of Commons 1640 to 1641 (Ph.D.). Vol. 1. Dublin: Trinity College. pp. 265–266. hdl:2262/77206. – Parliaments & Biographies (PDF downloadable from given URL)
- M'Enery, M. J. (1904). "A Diary of the Siege of Limerick Castle, 1642". The Journal of the Royal Society of Antiquaries of Ireland. 5th. 34 (2): 163–187. JSTOR 25507363.
- Meehan, Rev. Charles Patrick (1882). The Confederation of Kilkenny (New revised and enlarged ed.). Dublin: James Duffy. OCLC 224157081.
- Morrill, John, ed. (1991). The Impact of the English Civil War. London: Collins & Brown. ISBN 1-85585-042-7.
- Ohlmeyer, Jane H. (2004). "MacCarthy, Donough, first earl of Clancarty (1594–1665)". In Matthew, Colin; Harrison, Brian (eds.). Oxford Dictionary of National Biography. Vol. 35. New York: Oxford University Press. pp. 107–108. ISBN 0-19-861385-7.
- Ó Siochrú, Micheál (October 2009). McGuire, James; Quinn, James (eds.). "Roche, Maurice". Dictionary of Irish Biography.
- O'Sullivan, Mary Donovan (1983) [1st pub. 1942]. Old Galloway: the history of a Norman colony in Ireland. Galway: Kennys Bookshops and Art Galleries. ISBN 978-0-906312-21-6.
- Pocock, John Greville Agard (1996). "The Atlantic Archipelago and the War of the Three Kingdoms". In Bradshaw, Brendan; Morrill, John (eds.). The British Problem, c. 1534–1707. London: MacMillan Education. pp. 172–191. doi:10.1007/978-1-349-24731-8_7. ISBN 978-0-333-59246-5.
- Townshend, Dorothea (1904). "The Irish Attack on Youghal in 1642" (PDF). Journal of the Cork Historical and Archaeological Society. 10 (62): 100–102.
- Warner, Ferdinand (1768). History of the Rebellion and Civil-War in Ireland. Vol. II. Dublin: James William. OCLC 82770539. – 1643 to 1660 and index

Peerage of Ireland
Preceded by David Roche	Viscount Fermoy; 1635–1670	Succeeded by David Roche
