= Battle of Liscarroll =

17th-century Irish battle

Coordinates: 52.2603°N 8.8037°W

- Part of the Irish Confederate Wars
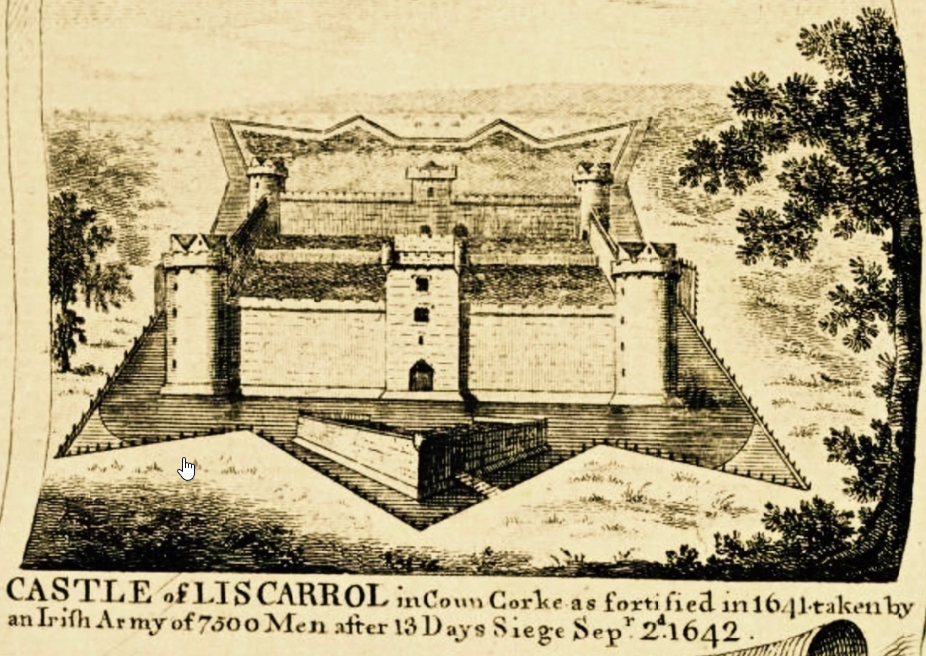
- Liscarroll Castle, captured by Muskerry the day before the battle
Date	3 September 1642
Location	Liscarroll, County Cork, Ireland
Result	Crown victory

Belligerents
Kingdom of Ireland	Irish Confederates

Commanders and leaders
Earl of Inchiquin	Garret Barry

Strength
2,000 foot 400 horse	7,000 foot 1,500 horse

Casualties and losses
Low	600

Liscarroll in Ireland

The Battle of Liscarroll was fought on 3 September 1642 in northern County Cork, Munster, between Irish Confederate and Royalist troops. The battle was part of the Irish Confederate Wars, which had started in the north in 1641 reaching Munster in 1642. The Confederates, about 8,500 strong, were led by Garret Barry, an Irish veteran from the Spanish Army of Flanders. The Royalist forces, about 2,400 strong, were commanded by Murrough O'Brien, 6th Baron of Inchiquin, an Irish Protestant. Despite his numerical disadvantage Inchiquin routed his enemies by the strength of his cavalry and the firepower of his musketeers.

== Background ==
Sir Phelim O'Neill launched the Rebellion in northern Ireland in October 1641, exploiting the King's weakness at the eve of the English Civil War. The rebellion spread south reaching Munster early in 1642. In January the Munster insurgents, led by the local Catholic noble Maurice Roche, 8th Viscount Fermoy, attacked the local English Protestant noble Richard Boyle, 1st Earl of Cork, at Youghal. In March and April the Munster insurgents, led by Fermoy and Donough MacCarty, 2nd Viscount Muskerry, besieged Cork City, but Murrough O'Brien, 6th Baron of Inchiquin, an Irish Protestant, counterattacked and drove the insurgents away. The Munster insurgents then gave the command of their army to Garret Barry, an Irish veteran from the Spanish Army of Flanders. In May and June Barry besieged and took Limerick. The insurgents also attacked castles given to English settlers during the Plantation of Munster. In summer 1642 the Munster insurgents attacked the castles of Sir Philip Perceval, an English knight. Muskerry took Annagh Castle, County Tipperary, and in August besieged Liscarroll Castle, northern County Cork. The castle surrendered on 2 September. (Note: The dates given for the sieges of Annagh and Liscarroll castles are confusing, but it is sure the sieges happened in the summer of 1642 and that Liscarrol fell on 2 September.) The next day Inchiquin with his army appeared before the castle, too late to save the castle but ready for battle.

== Battle ==
The Insurgents' army consisted of militia raised by the local Catholic lords. The insurgents' cavalry was led by Oliver Stephenson, who descended from Elizabethan English settlers but sided with the insurgents as he was Catholic.

The government force consisted of three English regiments and various local Protestant troops. The three English regiments had been sent to Ireland in February or early March 1642 to reinforce the army of Sir William St Leger, president of Munster. The first such regiment was commanded by Charles Vavasour, 1st Baronet, of Killingthorpe who landed with his regiment in Youghal in February Vavasour commanded the foot whereas Inchiquin was commander-in-chief and commanded the horse. Together they pursued the Irish when they finally fled.

The three eldest sons of the 1st Earl of Cork fought in the cavalry at the battle. They were: Richard Boyle, Viscount Dungarvan; Lewis, Viscount Boyle of Kinalmeaky; and Roger Boyle, Baron Broghill. Kinalmeaky was killed and succeeded by his elder brother as 2nd Viscount Kinalmeakey according to the special remainder of his title.

Stephenson's horsemen charged Inchiquin's force, putting them into disorder and even capturing Inchiquin himself. However, in the melee, Stephenson was shot dead by Inchiquin's brother (through the eye-piece of his helmet) and the Irish cavalry lost heart and fell back. The Irish infantry lacked the training and discipline to stand up to a cavalry charge and fled, leading to a rout of the Irish forces. The vast difference in the number of muskets was a major factor in the defeat of the Irish, some 1500 against 500. Most Irishmen wore pikes.

The next day Inchiquin with his army appeared before the castle. Despite inferior numbers the royalists defeated the insurgents under General Garret Barry in the ensuing Battle of Liscarroll. Muskerry allegedly panicked, fled, and caused others to flee. His Protestant acquaintance Barrymore died in September, supposedly of wounds received in the battle.

== Casualties and consequences ==
About 600 Irish Confederates were killed, among them a high proportion of officers like Stephenson. The local Catholic gentry were decimated by the battle, for instance the Fitzgerald family of the House of Desmond had 18 of their members killed. They were buried in a mass grave just outside Liscarroll. In addition, Inchiquin executed 50 more Confederate officers whom he had taken prisoner, hanging them the next morning. The battle meant that south central County Cork with the towns of Cork City, Bandon, Kinsale and Youghal would form an English and Protestant stronghold for the rest of the war.

== Notes, citations, and sources ==
=== Sources ===
- Adams, Constance Louisa (1904). Castles of Ireland – Some Fortress Histories and Legends. London: Elliot Stock. OCLC 751487142.
- Armstrong, Robert (October 2009). "Barry, David Fitz-David". Dictionary of Irish Biography. – Online edition
- Bagwell, Richard (1895). "O'Brien, Murrough, first Earl of Inchiquin (1614–1674)". In Lee, Sidney (ed.). Dictionary of National Biography. Vol. 41. New York: MacMillan and Co. pp. 320–327. OCLC 8544105.
- Bagwell, Richard (1909). Ireland under the Stuarts and under the Interregnum. Vol. 2. London: Longmans, Green, and Co. OCLC 458582656. – 1642 to 1660
- Buckley, James (1898). "The battle of Liscarroll, 1642" (PDF). Journal of the Cork Historical and Archaeological Society. 4 (38): 83–100.
- Coffey, Diarmid (1914). O'Neill and Ormond – A Chapter of Irish History. Dublin: Maunsel & Company. OCLC 906164979.
- Cregan, Donal F. (1995). "The Confederate Catholics of Ireland: The Personal of the Confederation, 1642–9". Irish Historical Studies. 29 (116): 490–512. doi:10.1017/S0021121400012256. JSTOR 30006772. S2CID 159935676.
- Gibson, Charles Bernard (1861). The History of the County and City of Cork. Vol. 2. London: Thomas C. Newby. OCLC 1046522071. – 1602 and later
- Little, Patrick (2004a). "O'Brien, Murrough, first earl of Inchiquin (1614–1674)". In Matthew, Colin; Harrison, Brian (eds.). Oxford Dictionary of National Biography. Vol. 41. New York: Oxford University Press. pp. 360–362. ISBN 0-19-861391-1.
- Little, Patrick (2004b). "Perceval, Sir Philip". In Matthew, Colin; Harrison, Brian (eds.). Oxford Dictionary of National Biography. Vol. 43. New York: Oxford University Press. pp. 661–637. ISBN 0-19-861393-8.
- Meehan, Rev. Charles Patrick (1882). The Confederation of Kilkenny (New revised and enlarged ed.). Dublin: James Duffy. OCLC 561870165.
- M'Enery, M. J. (1904). "A Diary of the Siege of Limerick Castle, 1642". The Journal of the Royal Society of Antiquaries of Ireland. 5th. 34 (2): 163–187. JSTOR 25507363.
- McGrath, Brid (1997). "William St. Leger (c1580–1642) Cork County". A Biographical Dictionary of the Membership of the Irish House of Commons 1640 to 1641 (Thesis). Vol. 1. Dublin: Trinity College. pp. 265–266. hdl:2262/77206. – Parliaments & Biographies (PDF downloadable from given URL)
- Moriarty, G. P. (1895). "Perceval, Sir Philip (1605–1647)". In Lee, Sidney (ed.). Dictionary of National Biography. Vol. 44. New York: MacMillan and Co. pp. 373–375. OCLC 1043016801.
- Murphy, John A. (October 2009). "O'Brien, Murrough". Dictionary of Irish Biography.
- Ohlmeyer, Jane H. (2004). "MacCarthy, Donough, first earl of Clancarty (1594–1665)". In Matthew, Colin; Harrison, Brian (eds.). Oxford Dictionary of National Biography. Vol. 35. New York: Oxford University Press. pp. 107–108. ISBN 0-19-861385-7.
- Ohlmeyer, Jane H. (2012). Making Ireland English: The Irish Aristocracy in the Seventeenth Century. New Haven, Connecticut: Yale University Press. ISBN 978-0-300-11834-6. – (Preview)
- Perceval-Maxwell, Michael (1994). The Outbreak of the Irish Rebellion of 1641. Montreal: McGill-Queen's University Press. ISBN 0-7735-1157-1. – (Preview)
- Smith, Charles (1893). The Ancient and Present State of the County and City of Cork. Vol. 2. Cork: Guy and Co. OCLC 559463963. – History
- Townshend, Dorothea (1904). "The Irish Attack on Youghal in 1642" (PDF). Journal of the Cork Historical and Archaeological Society. 10 (62): 100–102.
- "The Battle for Liscarroll Castle". Cork Independent. 25 February 2016.
- "Ireland's Wars: Liscarroll". Never Felt Better. Never Felt Better. 22 May 2013.
- O'Connell, Denis. "Battle of Liscarroll". Liscarroll. Liscarroll Community Council.
- Westropp, Thomas Johnson (1907). "The Principal Ancient Castles of the County Limerick: Part II Tudor Period". The Journal of the Royal Society of Antiquaries of Ireland. 37 (2): 153–164. JSTOR 25507604.
- Wiggins, Kenneth (2001). Anatomy of a Siege: King John's Castle, Limerick, 1642. London: The Boydell Press. ISBN 0-85115-827-7.
