= William St Leger =

Irish official, MP, and landlord (1586–1642)

Sir William St Leger
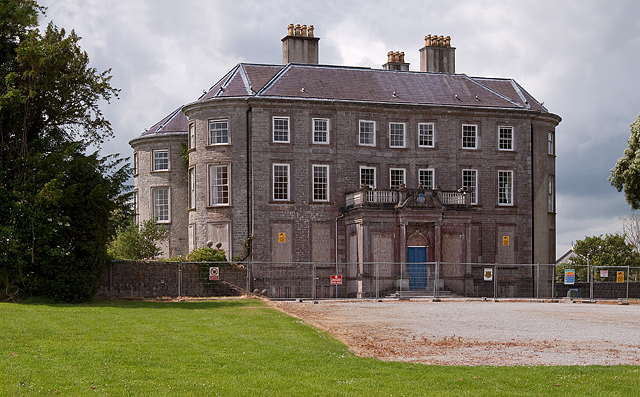
- St. Leger family home at Doneraile Court, rebuilt 1690s (Note: The original constructed by William St Leger in the 1630s was largely destroyed in 1645; now owned by the Irish state, the house is currently (2022) being restored.)

Lord President of Munster
- In office 1627–1642

Personal details
- Born: 12 August 1586 Ireland
- Died: 9 July 1642 (aged 55–56) Doneraile Court, County Cork
- Resting place: St Mary's, Doneraile
- Spouse(s): Gertrude de Vries (1615-1624); Gertrude Heywood
- Children: 3
- Parents: Sir Warham St Leger (1560–1600) (father); Elizabeth Rothe (1566–1620) (mother)

Military service
- Rank: Lieutenant-general
- Battles/wars: War of the Jülich Succession; Eighty Years War; Siege of Bergen op Zoom; Cádiz expedition; Anglo-French War (1627–1629); Siege of Saint-Martin-de-Ré; Bishops' Wars; Irish Confederate Wars; Capture of Dungarvan

Sir William St Leger PC (Ire) (1586–1642) was an Anglo-Irish landowner, administrator and soldier, who began his military career in the Eighty Years' War against Habsburg Spain. He settled in Ireland in 1624, where he was MP for County Cork in two Irish parliaments and Lord President of Munster. During the Irish Rebellion of 1641, he played a leading part in suppressing the rising in Munster before dying in 1642.

== Personal details ==
William St Leger was born in August 1586, probably in County Cork, eldest son of Sir Warham St Leger (1560–1600) and his wife Elizabeth Rothe, for whom it was her third marriage. His great-grandfather Anthony St Leger (1496–1559), had served as Lord Deputy of Ireland from 1540 to 1548, whereas his father held a number of administrative positions in Munster before he was killed during the Nine Years' War in 1600.

While resident in Dordrecht during the Dutch War of Independence, he married Gertrude de Vries (1588–1624) in 1616; they had two children, William (1620-1644), killed fighting for the Royalists during the First English Civil War, and Elizabeth (1618–1685), who in 1635 married St Leger's ward Murrough O'Brien, 1st Earl of Inchiquin. With his second wife Gertrude Heywood, he had another two children, John (1637–1692) and Barbara.

== Career ==
=== The Netherlands ===
Few details are known of St Leger's career before 1607, when he killed a man in a duel and took refuge from the law with Hugh O'Neill, Earl of Tyrone, one of the leaders of the rebellion in which his father died. When O'Neill and his companions went into exile a few months later, St Leger accompanied them to Brussels in the Spanish Netherlands but as a Protestant refused to follow them into Spanish service. Although the 1609 Twelve Years' Truce had temporarily halted the Eighty Years War, he moved to the Dutch Republic and took up a military career. In May 1610, he was pardoned by for the murder by James I and appointed captain in Lord Cecil's regiment, an English unit in Dutch service that fought in the War of the Jülich Succession, often viewed as the precursor of the Thirty Years War.

For many English officers in the Dutch States Army, local connections were seen as essential to secure promotion, which may have been a factor in St Leger's marriage to Gertrude de Vries in 1616. Shortly after, he became part of the patronage network around George Villiers, 1st Duke of Buckingham, whose personal relationship with James I made him extremely powerful. With Buckingham's support, St Leger was knighted in 1618 and awarded estates in Leinster, part of a policy of transferring lands from the Catholic Irish to Protestant settlers. After the truce ended in 1622, St Leger served under Sir Charles Morgan in the defence of Bergen op Zoom. In 1624, he was appointed agent for lands in Upper Ossory granted to Buckingham by James I.

In October 1625 he commanded a regiment during a failed attack on Cádiz; most of the landing force became drunk and St Leger claimed he "had never seen men acting with such beastliness". Although Buckingham retained his influence at court following the succession of Charles I, the damage to his reputation was enhanced by an equally disastrous assault on Saint-Martin-de-Ré in 1627 which St Leger also helped organise. Buckingham's assassination in August 1628 was greeted with widespread public rejoicing.

=== Ireland: 1627 to 1642 ===
In March 1627, St Leger joined the Privy Council of Ireland and succeeded Buckingham's half-brother Sir Edward Villiers as President of Munster. Along with this position, he inherited Buckingham's struggle for control of the province with his local rival Richard Boyle, 1st Earl of Cork, and to counter this, St Leger became an ally of Thomas Wentworth when the latter was named Lord Deputy of Ireland in January 1632. In 1630, St Leger had proposed a new plantation scheme in County Tipperary, which was never implemented but aligned with Strafford's long-term policy of expanding Protestant cultural and religious dominance in Ireland.

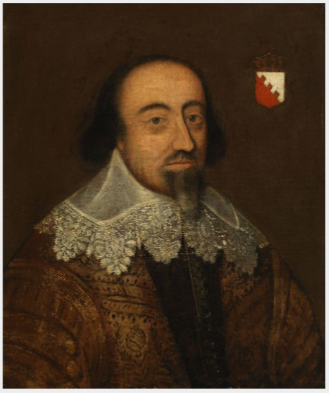
Richard Boyle, 1st Earl of Cork, St Leger's political rival in Munster

However, in the short term, Strafford was less concerned with religious issues and more focused on increasing royal income by reclaiming lands that rightfully belonged to the Crown and ending widespread corruption among government office holders. Both particularly impacted so-called New English settlers like Boyle, who were the primary beneficiaries of such practices and viewed Catholicism as an immediate threat to their positions. When St Leger was elected Member of Parliament for County Cork in the Irish Parliament of 1634–1635 where he backed Strafford's policy of making limited concessions to the Catholic gentry in return for subsidies.

The first of the Bishops' Wars in 1639 ended with the Covenanters in control of Scotland, a defeat Charles I was determined to reverse. To help achieve this, in December 1639 Stafford called the 2nd Irish Parliament of King Charles I to approve funding for an Irish expeditionary force that would land in Western Scotland. St Leger was re-elected for County Cork to the Irish Parliament of 1640–1649. (Note: Also called the "Parliament of 1639–1648" as its start date and end date are both affected by the shift in the start of the year from 25 March to 1 January in the calendar reform of 1750. The opening date, the 16 March 1640, was still in 1639 according to the Old Style (O.S.) calendar, in force in Great Britain and Ireland at the time, under which each year ended on 5 April. Similarly, the end date, 30 January 1649 (the execution of Charles I), was still in 1648 according to O.S.) Under Strafford's guidance, Parliament unanimously voted four subsidies of £45,000 to fund an Irish army of 9,000 for use against the Scots in the Second Bishops' War.

St Leger was appointed Sergeant Major (Note: The term was then used for a general officer, rather than its modern usage of a senior Non-commissioned officer.) with responsibility for training the new recruits, who were based in Carrickfergus ready for transport to Scotland or northern England. In July 1640, St Leger declared them ready for service but they remained in Ireland throughout the Second Bishops' War. The main impact was to deepen divisions between Strafford and his opponents in both the Irish and English Parliaments, which led to his trial and execution in May 1641.

An additional complication was what to do with the newly formed army, many of whom were Catholic and thus viewed with deep suspicion by the Protestant-dominated Dublin Castle administration. It was eventually agreed they could take service with Spain and when the Irish Rebellion began in October 1641, around 2,500 men under Garret Barry were waiting in Kinsale for shipment to the Army of Flanders.

As Lord President, St Leger was responsible for dealing with the insurgents in Munster, but the forces and supplies placed at his disposal were inadequate. In February 1942 he was reinforced by the arrival at Youghal of Charles Vavasour and his regiment. He also brought St Leger the royal declaration of 1 January 1642 in which the King denounced the rebels. St Leger was still struggling with the insurrection when he died on 2 July 1642, either at Doneraile Court or at Cork.

== Reputation ==
His reputation in the minds of Irish nationalist historians is that he executed martial law in his province with the greatest severity, hanging large numbers of rebels, often without much proof of guilt. In 1843, Daniel O'Connell quoted him as saying about the harsh policy adopted by the government in Dublin: "The undue promulgation of that severe determination to extirpate the Irish and papacy out of the kingdom, your Lordship rightly apprehends to be too unseasonably published." in such sense that he approved of the policy of extirpation. O'Connell went on "This St. Leger was himself one of the chief extirpators".

== Sources ==
- Asch, Ronald G. (2004). "Wentworth, Thomas, first earl of Strafford (1593–1641)". In Matthew, Colin; Harrison, Brian (eds.). Oxford Dictionary of National Biography. Vol. 56. New York: Oxford University Press. pp. 142–157. ISBN 0-19-861408-X.
- Bagwell, Richard (1897). "St. Leger, William (d. 1642)". In Lee, Sidney (ed.). Dictionary of National Biography. Vol. L. London: Smith, Elder, & Co. pp. 168–171. OCLC 8544105.
- Bagwell, Richard (1909). Ireland under the Stuarts and under the Interregnum. Vol. II. London: Longmans, Green, and Co. OCLC 458582656. – 1642 to 1660
- Burke, Bernard; Burke, Ashworth Peter (1909). A Genealogical and Heraldic History of the Peerage and Baronetage, the Privy Council, Knightage and Companionage (71st ed.). London: Harrison. OCLC 28297274.
- Clavin, Terry (2004). "St. Leger, William, d. 1642". Oxford Dictionary of National Biography (online ed.). Oxford University Press. doi:10.1093/ref:odnb/24516. (Subscription, Wikipedia Library access or UK public library membership required.)
- Cokayne, George Edward (1896). Complete Peerage of England, Scotland, Ireland, Great Britain and the United Kingdom, Extant, Extinct, or Dormant. Vol. 7 (1st ed.). London: George Bell and Sons. OCLC 1180891114. – S to T (for Strafford)
- Cokayne, George Edward (1916). Gibbs, Vicary (ed.). The complete peerage of England, Scotland, Ireland, Great Britain and the United Kingdom, extant, extinct, or dormant. Vol. IV (2nd ed.). London: St Catherine Press. OCLC 228661424. – Dacre to Dysart
- Corish, Patrick J. (1976). "Chapter XI: The rising of 1641 and the Catholic Confederacy, 1641–5". In Moody, Theodore William; Martin, F. X.; Byrne, Francis John (eds.). A New History of Ireland. Vol. 3. Oxford: Oxford University Press. pp. 289–316. ISBN 978-0-19-820242-4. – 1641 to 1645 (Preview)
- Fryde, E. B.; Greenway, D. E.; Porter, S.; Roy, I., eds. (1986). Handbook of British Chronology. Royal Historical Society Guides and Handbooks, No. 2 (3rd ed.). London: Offices of the Royal Historical Society. ISBN 0-86193-106-8. – (for timeline)
- Gerard, John (1913). "Chronology, General". In Herbermann, Charles George (ed.). Catholic Encyclopedia. Vol. III. New York: The Encyclopedia Press. pp. 738–742. OCLC 1157968788.
- Gibson, Charles Bernard (1861). The History of the County and City of Cork. Vol. II. London: Thomas C. Newby. OCLC 1046522071. – 1603 to 1860
- Gillespie, Raymond (2006). Seventeenth-Century Ireland: Making Ireland Modern. Dublin: Gill & MacMillan. ISBN 978-0-7171-3946-0.
- Harris, Tim (2014). Rebellion, Britains's First Stuart Kings 1567-1642. Oxford: Oxford University Press. ISBN 978-0-19-920900-2. – (Preview)
- House of Commons (1878). Return. Members of Parliament – Part II. Parliaments of Great Britain, 1705–1796. Parliaments of the United Kingdom, 1801–1874. Parliaments and Conventions of the Estates of Scotland, 1357–1707. Parliaments of Ireland, 1599–1800. London: His/Her Majesty's Stationery Office. OCLC 13112546.
- Lenihan, Pádraig (2001). Confederate Catholics at War, 1641–49. Cork: Cork University Press. ISBN 1-85918-244-5. – Does not seem to be available online
- Lockyer, Roger (2004). "Villiers, George, first duke of Buckingham (1592–1628)". Oxford Dictionary of National Biography (online ed.). Oxford University Press. doi:10.1093/ref:odnb/28293. (Subscription, Wikipedia Library access or UK public library membership required.)
- McCarthy, Patrick (2001). "The 1641 Rebellion in Cork to the battle of Liscarroll, 3 September 1642". The Irish Sword. 22 (90): 369–372.
- Murphy, Elaine (October 2009). "St Leger, Sir William". Dictionary of Irish Biography.
- O'Connell, Daniel (1869) [1st pub. 1843]. A memoir of Ireland native and Saxon. Dublin: James Duffy. OCLC 1048802636.
- Ohlmeyer, Jane H. (2001) [1st pub. 1993]. Civil War and Restoration in the Three Stuart Kingdoms: The Career of Randal MacDonnell, Marquis of Antrim (2nd ed.). Dublin: Four Courts Press. ISBN 1-85182-626-2. – (Snippet view)
- Perceval-Maxwell, Michael (1994). The Outbreak of the Irish Rebellion of 1641. Montreal: McGill-Queen's University Press. ISBN 0-7735-1157-1. – (Preview)
- Stearns, Stephen (2007). "Military order and martial disorder in early Stuart England". In Sharp, Buchanon; Fissel, Mark Charles (eds.). Law and authority in early modern England: essays presented to Thomas Garden Barnes. Newark: University of Delaware Press. ISBN 978-0-87413-959-4.
- Trim, David (2002). Fighting 'Jacob's Wars'; the employment of English & Welsh mercenaries in the European Wars of Religion - France and the Netherlands, 1562-1610 (PDF) (PHD). King's College, London.
- Wedgwood, Cicely Veronica (1961). Thomas Wentworth, First Earl of Strafford 1593–1641. A Revaluation. London: Jonathan Cape. OCLC 1068569885.

Political offices
Preceded by Edward Villiers	Lord President of Munster; 1627–1642	Succeeded by Jerome Weston, 2nd Earl of Portland
Parliament of Ireland
Preceded by Dermod McCarthy; Andrew Barret	Member of Parliament for County Cork; 1634–1635; With: Sir Donough MacCarty	Succeeded by Donough MacCarty; Sir William St Leger
Preceded by Donough MacCarty; Sir William St Leger	Member of Parliament for County Cork; 1640–1642; With: Sir Donough MacCarty; Redmond Roche	Vacant
