= Charles Vavasour, 1st Baronet, of Killingthorpe =

English soldier (died 1644)

Sir Charles Vavasour
- Baronet Vavasour of Killingthorpe
- Tenure: 1631–1644
- Died: February 1644; Oxford
- Father: Sir Thomas Vavasour
- Mother: Mary Dodges

Sir Charles Vavasour, 1st Baronet, of Killingthorpe (c. 1585 – 1644) was an English soldier who fought the insurgents in the Irish Rebellion of 1641 where he excelled at the Battle of Liscarroll in 1642 but was defeated in the Battle of Cloughleagh of the ensuing Irish Confederate Wars. After the cease-fire of September 1643 he was sent to England to fight the Parliamentarians in the First English Civil War, but his regiment mutinied and he resigned his commission, dying soon after in Oxford.

== Birth, origins, and early life ==
Charles was born the third but became the eldest surviving son of Sir Thomas Vavasour of Copmanthorpe, County York, and his wife Mary Dodges. He must not be confused with his younger brother who was to become Sir William Vavasour, 1st Baronet of Copmansthorpe, and would pursue a similar military career but rising to major general, outshining his brother.

Vavasour succeeded his father in 1620. He was created Baronet of Killingthorpe on 22 June 1636 but with a precedence of 29 June 1611. It seems that in his youth he fought in the Thirty Years' War in Germany.

== Irish wars ==
During the Irish Rebellion of 1641 Vavasour commanded one of the three English regiments that reinforced the army of Sir William St Leger in February or early March 1642. Vavasour landed in February with his regiment in Youghal on the Irish south coast. He also brought St Leger the royal declaration of 1 January 1642 in which the King denounced the rebels.

In March and April, Donough MacCarty, 2nd Viscount Muskerry and Maurice Roche, 8th Viscount Fermoy. with 4,000 men besieged St Leger in Cork City. On 13 April 1642 Vavasour fought under Murrough O'Brien, 6th Baron of Inchiquin, an Irish Protestant, in the sally that lifted the siege by driving the rebels from their base at Rochfordstown.

Next Vavasour commanded the foot at the Battle of Liscarrol on 3 September 1642, again under Inchiquin who was commander-in-chief and commanded the horse. and pursued the Irish when they finally fled. He was then appointed to succeed Lewis Boyle, 1st Viscount of Kinalmeaky, who had been killed at the battle, as governor of Bandon.

In the ensuing Irish Confederate Wars Vavasour was defeated on 4 June 1643 by James Tuchet, 3rd Earl of Castlehaven at the Battle of Cloughleagh and taken prisoner.

== First English Civil War ==
On 15 September 1643 James Butler, 1st Marquess of Ormond, the Lord Lieutenant of Ireland signed a ceasefire, called the Cessation, with the Irish Catholic Confederation. Ormond sent five regiments to England to fight the Parliamentarians in the First English Civil War. Vavasour with his regiment landed in October in Bristol. They became part of the army commanded by Ralph Hopton, 1st Baron Hopton, but the regiment mutinied and Vavasour resigned his commission. The regiment was pacified and Matthew Appleyard succeeded Vavasour as its colonel. (Note: Samuel Rawson Gardiner writes in History of the Great Civil War, 1642–1649 that Charles Vavasour with his regiment was posted near Gloucester and was then called to Oxford to reinforce the main army but it seems that this Vavasour was William, not Charles.)

== Death ==
Sir Charles Vavasour died at Oxford unmarried in February 1644.

== Notes and references ==
=== Sources ===
- Bagwell, Richard (1895). "O'Brien, Murrough, first Earl of Inchiquin (1614–1674)". In Lee, Sidney (ed.). Dictionary of National Biography. Vol. XLI. New York: MacMillan and Co. pp. 320–327. OCLC 8544105.
- Bagwell, Richard (1909). Ireland under the Stuarts and under the Interregnum. Vol. II. London: Longmans, Green, and Co. OCLC 458582656. – 1642 to 1660
- Burke, John; Burke, Bernard (1844). A Genealogical and Heraldic History of the Extinct and Dormant Baronetcies of England, Ireland, and Scotland (2nd ed.). London: John Russell Smith.
- Cokayne, George Edward (1902). Complete Baronetage, 1611 to 1800. Vol. II (1st ed.). Exeter: William Pollard & Co. OCLC 866278985. – 1625 to 1649
- Cregan, Donal F. (1995). "The Confederate Catholics of Ireland: The Personal of the Confederation, 1642–9". Irish Historical Studies. XXIX (116): 490–512. doi:10.1017/S0021121400012256. JSTOR 30006772. S2CID 159935676.
- Gardiner, Samuel Rawson (1886). History of the Great Civil War 1642–1649. Vol. I. London: Longmans, Green & Co. OCLC 874431332. – 1642 to 1644
- Gibson, Charles Bernard (1861). The History of the County and City of Cork. Vol. II. London: Thomas C. Newby. OCLC 1046522071. – 1603 to 1860
- McGrath, Brid (1997). "William St. Leger (c1580–1642) Cork County". A Biographical Dictionary of the Membership of the Irish House of Commons 1640 to 1641 (Ph.D.). Vol. 1. Dublin: Trinity College. pp. 265–266. hdl:2262/77206. – Parliaments & Biographies (PDF downloadable from given URL)
- Meehan, Rev. Charles Patrick (1882). The Confederation of Kilkenny (New revised and enlarged ed.). Dublin: James Duffy. OCLC 224157081.
- Newman, P. R. (1993). The Old Service: Royalist Regiment Colonels and the Civil War, 1642–1646. Manchester: Manchester University Press. ISBN 0-7190-3752-2. – (Preview)
- Ohlmeyer, Jane H. (2004). "MacCarthy, Donough, first earl of Clancarty (1594–1665)". In Matthew, Colin; Harrison, Brian (eds.). Oxford Dictionary of National Biography. Vol. 35. New York: Oxford University Press. pp. 107–108. ISBN 0-19-861385-7.
- Smith, Charles (1893) [1st pub. 1750]. The Ancient and Present State of the County and City of Cork. Vol. II. Cork: Guy and Co. OCLC 559463963. – History
- Wiggins, Kenneth (2001). Anatomy of a Siege: King John's Castle, Limerick, 1642. London: The Boydell Press. ISBN 0-85115-827-7. – (Preview)

Baronetage of England
Preceded by Grenville baronets	Vavasour baronets of Killingthorpe; 22 June 1631	Succeeded by Tyrrell baronets
