= David Roche, 7th Viscount Fermoy =

Irish lord (died 1635)

David Roche
- Viscount Fermoy
- Tenure: 1600–1635
- Predecessor: Maurice, 6th Viscount Fermoy
- Successor: Maurice, 8th Viscount Fermoy
- Born: c. 1573
- Died: 22 March 1635; Castletownroche
- Buried: Bridgetown Abbey
- Spouse: Joan Barry
- Issue Detail: Maurice & others
- Father: Maurice, 6th Viscount Fermoy
- Mother: Eleanor FitzGerald

David Roche, 7th Viscount Fermoy (1573–1635) was an Irish magnate, soldier, and politician.

== Birth and origins ==
David was born about 1573, probably in Castletownroche, County Cork, Ireland. He was the only surviving son of Maurice Roche and his first wife, Eleanor FitzGerald. His father was the 6th Viscount Fermoy (also counted as the 1st). His father's family, the Roches were Old English and descended from Adam de Rupe who had come to Ireland from Wales with Robert FitzStephen.

His mother was a daughter of Sir Maurice fitz John FitzGerald of Totane, younger brother of James FitzJohn FitzGerald, 13th Earl of Desmond and third son of the de facto 12th Earl of Desmond. She also was a sister of James FitzMaurice FitzGerald, the "archtraitor", who led the first Desmond Rebellion. Her family were the FitzGeralds of Desmond, a cadet branch of the Old English Geraldines, whose senior branch were the FitzGeralds of Kildare.

Family tree

David Roche with wife, parents, and other selected relatives. (Note: This family tree is based on genealogies of the viscounts of Fermoy, the earls of Clancarty, the MacCarthy of Muskerry family, and the earls of Desmond. Also see the lists of siblings and children in the text.)

John de facto 12th Earl d. 1536
James; 13th Earl d. 1558	Maurice; FitzJohn of Totane
Gerald; 14th Earl c. 1533 – 1583; Rebel Earl	David; 5th Viscount; Fermoy d. 1582	Ellen; Butler
James; FitzMaurice d. 1579; Archtraitor	Eleanor; FitzGerald	Maurice; 6th Viscount; Fermoy d. 1600	Catherine; FitzGerald
David; 7th Viscount; Fermoy; 1573–1635	Joan; Barry
Maurice; 8th Viscount; Fermoy; 1597–1670	Ellen; Power	Donal; MacCarty; Reagh d. 1636	Ellen; Roche	Charles; 1st Viscount; Muskerry; 1564–1641
David; 9th Viscount; Fermoy d. 1703; Naval officer	Charles; Kilbrittain	Eleanor; MacCarthy

Legend

XXX	Subject of the article	XXX	Viscounts; Fermoy	XXX	Viscounts Muskerry & Earls of Clancarty	XXX	Earls of Desmond

David listed among his brothers
He was the eldest of three brothers:
1. David (1573–1635)
2. Theobald, married Grany daughter of Sir Owen MacCarthy
3. John, of whom only the name is known

David's sisters
1. Ellen, also called Joan, married Donogh O'Brien, 4th Earl of Thomond.
2. Amy, married Dermot MacCarthy of Duhallow

== Early life and Desmond Rebellions ==
Despite these family relations, his father and grandfather fought against the insurgents in the Desmond Rebellions during which two of his paternal uncles were killed. His father succeeded his grandfather as the 6th Viscount Fermoy in 1581 or 1582. David was about ten in 1583 when the Desmond Rebellions ended with the killing of Gerald FitzGerald, the rebel earl.

His mother was still alive in 1590, but she predeceased his father, who remarried to Catherine FitzGerald, third daughter of the rebel earl by his second wife, Eleanor Butler.

== Marriage and children ==
Before 1593 Roche married Joan, daughter of James de Barry, 4th Viscount Buttevant, by his wife Ellen MacCarthy Reagh. His wife's family, the de Barrys, were Old English like his own and descended from Philip de Barry, who had come to Ireland from Wales in 1183.

David and Joan had five sons:

1. Maurice (1593–1670), who succeeded as the 8th Viscount Fermoy
2. John, deaf and dumb, died unmarried
3. Theobald, married Julia, daughter of Dominick Sarsfield, 1st Viscount Sarsfield, but had no issue
4. Ulick, married Gyles (Cecilia) daughter of John O'Conor Kerry, of Carrigfoyll, County Kerry
5. Redmond, accompanied St. Leger to Waterford in 1641 to submit the insurgents.

—and four daughters:

1. Ellen, who married first Donal MacCarthy Reagh of Kilbrittain, secondly Charles MacCarthy, 1st Viscount Muskerry, and thirdly Thomas Fitzmaurice, 4th son of Thomas Fitzmaurice, 18th Baron Kerry.
2. Elinor
3. Joan
4. Amy, married John Everard of Fethard, County Tipperary, as his second wife. (Note: John Everard of Fethard married Catherine Comerford, who predeceased him. Amy seems to have been his second wife.)

== 7th Viscount ==
Roche succeeded his father as the 7th Viscount Fermoy on 24 October 1600. He is also counted as 2nd Viscount.

== Proclamation of James I ==
Queen Elizabeth I died on 24 March 1603. Charles Blount, 8th Baron Mountjoy, her Lord Deputy of Ireland, proclaimed James VI and I as King. Several Irish towns, dominated by Old English families delayed the proclamation still hoping for a Catholic succession. This was the case of Cork. On 11 April Mountjoy sent Captain Morgan to Cork to proclaim James. Thornton and Fermoy, as he now was, proclaimed James I as King on 13 April 1603, outside the walls in the northern suburbs when the mayor, Thomas Sarsfield, hesitated to do so.

== House of Lords ==
Fermoy sat in the House of Lords of the Irish Parliament 1613–1615, the only Irish Parliament of James I. He coordinated the opposition to the electoral abuses of James I, together with Jenico Preston, 5th Viscount Gormanston

The Irish Parliament of 1634–1635 was opened on 14 July 1634 by the new Lord Deputy of Ireland, Thomas Wentworth (later to become Lord Strafford), who had taken up office in July 1633. Lord Fermoy, an old man, sat by proxy in the House of Lords of the Parliament 1634–1635.

== Death and timeline ==
Fermoy died on 22 March 1635 at Castlerochetown and was buried at Bridgetown Abbey. He was succeeded by his son Maurice as the 8th Viscount (also counted as the 3rd).

Timeline
As his birth date is uncertain, so are all his ages.
Age	Date	Event
0	1573, about	Born
7–8	1581 or 1582	His father succeeded his grandfather as the 6th Viscount Fermoy.
9–10	1583, 11 Nov	His stepmother's father, the 14th Earl of Desmond killed at the end of the 2nd Desmond Rebellion.
16–17	1590, 27 May	His mother was still alive but predeceased his father.
19–20	1593	Eldest son, Maurice, born
26–27	1600, 24 Oct	Succeeded as 7th Viscount Fermoy
27–28	1601, 22 Sep	The Spanish landed at Kinsale
29–30	1603, 24 Mar	Accession of King James I, succeeding Queen Elizabeth I
39–40	1613, Mar	Took his seat in the Parliament of Ireland
51–52	1625, 27 Mar	Accession of King Charles I, succeeding King James I
60–61	1634, 26 July	Took his seat by proxy in the Parliament of Ireland 1634–1635
61–62	1635, 22 Mar	Died at Castletownroche

== Notes, citations, and sources ==
=== Sources ===
- Burke, Bernard (1866). A Genealogical History of the Dormant, Abeyant, Forfeited and Extinct Peerages of the British Empire (New ed.). London: Harrison. OCLC 11501348. (for MacCarty and Roche)
- Cokayne, George Edward (1890). Complete Peerage of England, Scotland, Ireland, Great Britain and the United Kingdom, Extant, Extinct, or Dormant. Vol. III (1st ed.). London: George Bell and Sons. OCLC 1180838776. – D to F (for Fermoy)
- Cokayne, George Edward (1896). Complete Peerage of England, Scotland, Ireland, Great Britain and the United Kingdom, Extant, Extinct, or Dormant. Vol. VII (1st ed.). London: George Bell and Sons. OCLC 1180891114. – S to T (for Thomond)
- Cokayne, George Edward (1913). Gibbs, Vicary (ed.). The complete peerage of England, Scotland, Ireland, Great Britain and the United Kingdom, extant, extinct, or dormant. Vol. III (2nd ed.). London: St Catherine Press. OCLC 228661424. – Canonteign to Cutts (for Clancarty)
- Cokayne, George Edward (1916). Gibbs, Vicary (ed.). The complete peerage of England, Scotland, Ireland, Great Britain and the United Kingdom, extant, extinct, or dormant. Vol. IV (2nd ed.). London: St Catherine Press. OCLC 228661424. – Dacre to Dysart (for Desmond)
- Cokayne, George Edward (1926). Gibbs, Vicary (ed.). The complete peerage of England, Scotland, Ireland, Great Britain and the United Kingdom, extant, extinct, or dormant. Vol. V (2nd ed.). London: St Catherine Press. OCLC 228661424. – Eardley of Spalding to Goojerat (for Fermoy)
- Dunlop, Robert (1897). "Roche, David, Viscount Fermoy (1573?–635)". In Lee, Sidney (ed.). Dictionary of National Biography. Vol. IL. London: Smith, Elder, & Co. p. 68. OCLC 8544105.
- Dunlop, Robert; Cunningham, Bernadette (2004). "Roche, David, seventh viscount Roche of Fermoy (1573?–1635)". In Matthew, Colin; Harrison, Brian (eds.). Oxford Dictionary of National Biography. Vol. 47. New York: Oxford University Press. pp. 460–461. ISBN 0-19-861397-0.
- Fitzpatrick, Brendan (1989). Seventeenth-Century Ireland: The War of Religions. Totowa, New Jersey: Barnes & Noble Books. ISBN 0-389-20814-0.
- Fryde, E. B.; Greenway, D. E.; Porter, S.; Roy, I., eds. (1986). Handbook of British Chronology. Royal Historical Society Guides and Handbooks, No. 2 (3rd ed.). London: Offices of the Royal Historical Society. ISBN 0-86193-106-8. – (for timeline)
- Furnivall, Frederick J. (1896). The English Conquest of Ireland A.D. 1166–1185. London: Kegan Paul, Trench, Trübner & Co. OCLC 697742469.
- Gardiner, Samuel Rawson (1899). "Wentworth, Thomas, first Earl of Strafford (1593–1641)". In Lee, Sidney (ed.). Dictionary of National Biography. Vol. LX. London: Smith, Elder, & Co. pp. 268–283. OCLC 8544105.
- Gibson, Charles Bernard (1861). The History of the County and City of Cork. Vol. II. London: Thomas C. Newby. OCLC 1046522071. – 1603 to 1860
- House of Lords (1779). Journals of the House of Lords (PDF). Vol. I. Dublin: William Sleater. OCLC 35009219. – 1634 to 1699
- Joyce, Patrick Weston (1903). A Concise History of Ireland from the Earliest Times to 1837 (12th ed.). Dublin: M. H. Gill & Son. OCLC 815623752.
- Kearney, Hugh F. (1959). Strafford in Ireland 1633–1641 – a Study in Absolutism. Manchester: Manchester University Press. OCLC 857142293.
- Lainé, P. Louis (1836). "Mac-Carthy". Archives généalogiques et historiques de la noblesse de France [Genealogical and Historical Archives of the Nobility of France] (in French). Vol. Tome cinquième. Paris: Imprimerie de Bethune et Plon. pp. 1–102. OCLC 865941166.
- O'Hart, John (1892). Irish Pedigrees: Or, the Origin and Stem of the Irish Nation. Vol. II (5th ed.). Dublin: James Duffy & Co. OCLC 7239210. – Normans, English, Huguenots etc. (for Everard)
- Ó Siochrú, Micheál (October 2009). "Roche, David". Dictionary of Irish Biography.
- Smith, Charles (1893) [1st pub. 1750]. The Ancient and Present State of the County and City of Cork. Vol. II. Cork: Guy and Co. OCLC 559463963. – History
- Wedgwood, Cicely Veronica (1961). Thomas Wentworth, First Earl of Strafford 1593–1641. A Revaluation. London: Jonathan Cape. OCLC 1068569885.
- Yorke, Philip Chesney (1911). "Strafford, Thomas Wentworth, Earl of" . In Chisholm, Hugh (ed.). Encyclopædia Britannica. Vol. 25 (11th ed.). Cambridge University Press. pp. 978–980.

Peerage of Ireland
Preceded by Maurice Roche	Viscount Fermoy; 1600–1635	Succeeded by Maurice Roche
