= 2nd Irish Parliament of King Charles I =

Irish Parliament 1640–1649, the second of Charles I

The Parliament 1640–1649, also called Parliament 1639–1648 using an unadjusted Old Style (O.S.) calendar, (Note: The parliament's start date and end date are both affected by the shift in the start of the year from 25 March to 1 January in the calendar reform of 1750. The opening date, the 16 March 1640, was still in 1639 according to the Old Style (O.S.) calendar, in force in Great Britain and Ireland at the time. Similarly, the end date, 30 January 1649 (the execution of Charles I), was still in 1648 according to O.S.) was the second of the two Irish parliaments of King Charles I of England. It voted taxes in 1640 and was then overshadowed by the Irish Rebellion of 1641. It was legally dissolved by the King's death in 1649.

== Background ==
The Parliament was called by the Earl of Strafford, the Lord Lieutenant of Ireland, because of King Charles I's need to raise funds and men to fight against the Scots in the Second Bishops' War. The main item on the agenda therefore was taxation.

Parliaments: previous, subject of the article, and next
| Monarch | # | Years | Remark |
|---|---|---|---|
| Charles I of England | 1 | 1634–1635 | |
| Charles I of England | 2 | 1640–1649 | |
| Charles II of England | 1 | 1661–1666 | |

== Proceedings ==
=== 1st session ===
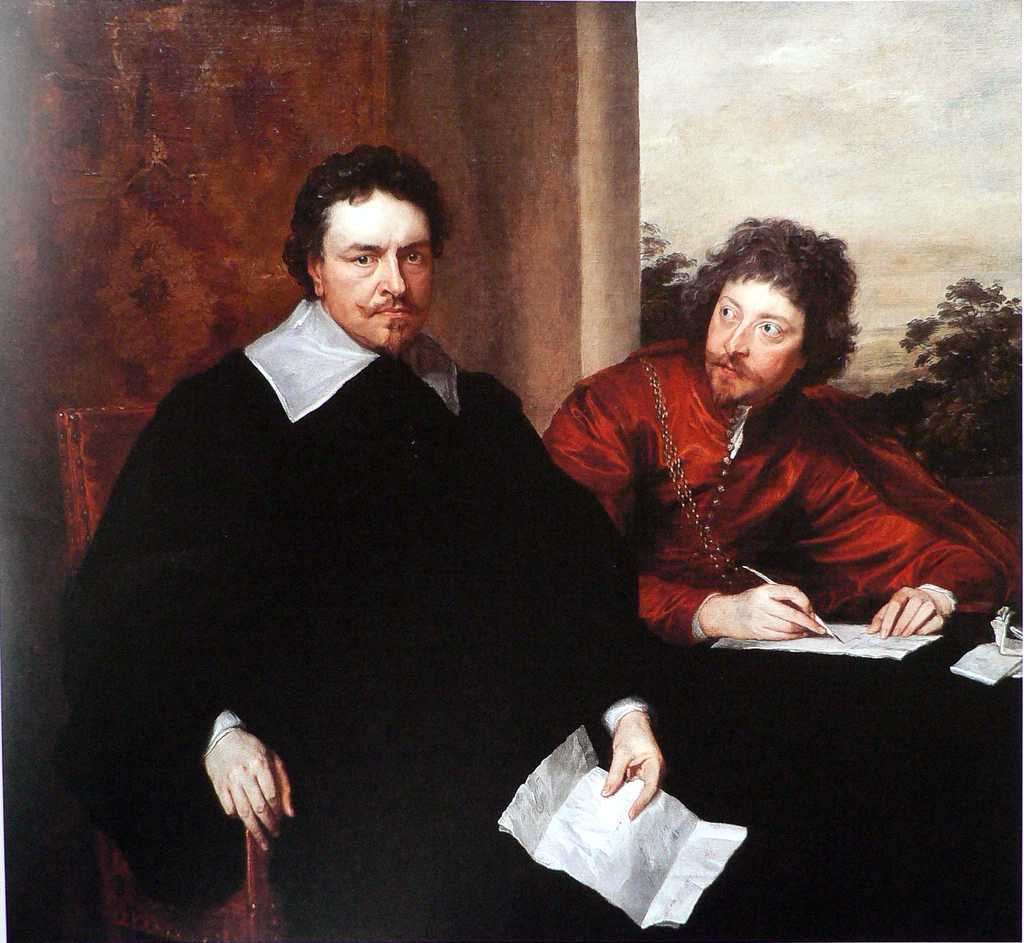
Lord Lieutenant Strafford

Parliament was opened on 16 March 1640 by Christopher Wandesford, whom the Lord Lieutenant Strafford had appointed his Lord Deputy. On that same day the parliament elected Sir Maurice Eustace, one of the two members for County Kildare, as speaker. Strafford arrived two days later. The parliament then unanimously voted four subsidies of £45,000 (about £9,500,000 in 2025) to raise an Irish army of 9,000 for use by the king against the Scots in the Second Bishops' War. On 31 March Strafford prorogued parliament until the first week of June. On 3 April 1640 Strafford left Ireland.

=== 2nd session ===
Lord Deputy Wandesford opened the 2nd Session on 1 June. News from England was the Short Parliament had refused subsidies to the King. The Irish MPs regretted having voted subsidies and wanted to sabotage their action by changing how the subsidies would be evaluated and collected. After two weeks of inconclusive discussions, Wandesford prorogued parliament on 17 June.

=== 3rd session ===
Parliament reconvened on 1 October 1640 for its 3rd Session. The Commons created a committee for grievances. The committee prepared a remonstrance (complaint) against Strafford, that was then approved by the House of Commons. This remonstrance is also called the "November Petition". Wandesford prorogued parliament on 12 November, a day after Strafford's impeachment in Westminster by the Long Parliament. A delegation of 13 MPs, headed by Audley Mervyn, travelled to London to submit the remonstrance to the King, arriving on 21 November. On 12 November Wandesford prorogued Parliament until 26 January 1641. The Irish House of Lords had not acted on grievances during the 3rd Session, but after its prorogation some Lords decided to send Gormanston, Dillon, Kilmallock, and Muskerry to London to present separate Lords' grievances.

=== 4th session ===
The Irish Parliament met in its 4th Session on 26 January 1641. Lord Deputy Wandesford had died on 3 December and the Irish government had devolved upon the Lords Justices, Parsons and Borlase. The Lords recognised its members who had gone to London as one of its committees. On 18 February the Lords' grievances were written up in 18 articles. The main complaint was that Strafford had overtaxed them.

On 20 February 1641, Muskerry, aged about 70, died in London during his parliamentary mission. His son, Charles MacCarty, one of the two MPs of County Cork, succeeded his father at the Lords. In the resulting byelection Redmond Roche was elected to his seat at the Commons. Muskerry's place in the Lords' delegation in London stayed vacant until 3 March when the Lords appointed Thomas Roper, 2nd Viscount Baltinglass in his stead. The Lords Justices prorogued parliament on 6 March.

=== 5th session ===
On 11 May 1641 parliament reconvened for its 5th session. The Catholic MPs tried to impeach Loftus, the chancellor, and Ranelagh, the vice-president of Connaught, but failed.

Table of sessions
Later sessions are poorly recorded.
| Session | Start | End | Remark |
| 1st | 16 Mar 1640 | 31 Mar 1640 | Voted 4 subsidies unanimously |
| 2nd | 1 Jun 1640 | 17 Jun 1640 | Inconclusive |
| 3rd | 1 Oct 1640 | 12 Nov 1640 | Remonstrance passed |
| 4th | 26 Jan 1641 | 6 Mar 1641 | |
| 5th | 11 May 1641 | 7 Aug 1641 | Impeachments of Loftus and Ranelagh failed |
| 6th | 9 Nov 1641 | 9 Nov 1641 | Adjourned on the same day. |
| 6th | 16 Nov 1641 | 17 Nov 1641 | Voted a protest against the rising |
| 7th | 11 Jan 1642 | | |
| 8th | 1 Aug 1642 | | |

== Expulsions and cessation ==
In June 1642 Sir Robert Lynch and Redmond Roche (on the 22nd) were expelled from parliament for having joined the rebels. There must have been others in the same case. William H. Grattan Flood in his ‘History of Enniscorthy’ (1898) says on 22 June 1642, nine MPs from Co. Wexford, described as “rotten and unprofitable members, fit to be cut off,” were formally expelled. Sir Thomas Esmonde, MP for Enniscorthy; Christopher Hollywood and Gerald Cheevers for the Borough of Bannow; John Furlong and Patrick French MPs for Wexford; Nicholas Dormer and Christopher Brooke for New Ross; Hugh Rochford and Nicholas Stafford for Fethard. These were nine of forty members who were expelled

The sessions of the Parliament ceased in 1647 when Marquess of Ormond handed Dublin over to the Parliamentarians, but King Charles I never formally dissolved the parliament. Legally, the Parliament is considered dissolved by King Charles I's execution in 1649.

== See also ==
- List of acts of the Parliament of Ireland, 1600–1690
- List of Irish MPs 1639–1649
- List of parliaments of Ireland

== Notes and references ==
=== Sources ===
- Airy, Osmund (1886). "Butler, James, twelfth Earl and first Duke of Ormonde (1610–1688)". In Lee, Sidney (ed.). Dictionary of National Biography. Vol. VIII. New York: MacMillan and Co. pp. 52–60. OCLC 8544105.
- Asch, Ronald G. (2004). "Wentworth, Thomas, first earl of Strafford (1593–1641)". In Matthew, Colin; Harrison, Brian (eds.). Oxford Dictionary of National Biography. Vol. 56. New York: Oxford University Press. pp. 142–157. ISBN 0-19-861408-X.
- Bagwell, Richard (1909). Ireland under the Stuarts and under the Interregnum. Vol. I. London: Longmans, Green, and Co. OCLC 458582656. – 1603 to 1642
- Carte, Thomas (1851) [1st pub. 1736]. The Life of James Duke of Ormond. Vol. I (New ed.). Oxford: Oxford University Press. OCLC 1086656347. – 1613 to 1641
- Clarke, Aidan (1976). "Chapter X: The Breakdown of Authority". In Moody, Theodore William; Martin, F. X.; Byrne, Francis John (eds.). A New History of Ireland. Vol. III. Oxford: Oxford University Press. pp. 270–288. ISBN 0-19-820242-3. – 1640 to 1641
- Clavin, Terry (October 2009). McGuire, James; Quinn, James (eds.). "Wandesford, Christopher". Dictionary of Irish Biography.
- Cokayne, George Edward (1900). Complete Baronetage, 1611 to 1800. Vol. I (1st ed.). Exeter: William Pollard & Co. OCLC 866278985. – 1611 to 1625
- Fryde, E. B.; Greenway, D. E.; Porter, S.; Roy, I., eds. (1986). Handbook of British Chronology. Royal Historical Society Guides and Handbooks, No. 2 (3rd ed.). London: Offices of the Royal Historical Society. ISBN 0-86193-106-8. – (for timeline)
- Gardiner, Samuel Rawson (1904). History of England from the Accession of James I to the Outbreak of the Civil War. Vol. IX. London: Longmans, Green & Co. OCLC 559091724. – 1639 to 1641
- Gerard, John (1913). "Chronology, General". In Herbermann, Charles George (ed.). Catholic Encyclopedia. Vol. III. New York: The Encyclopedia Press. pp. 738–742. OCLC 1157968788.
- House of Commons (1878). Return. Members of Parliament – Part II. Parliaments of Great Britain, 1705–1796. Parliaments of the United Kingdom, 1801–1874. Parliaments and Conventions of the Estates of Scotland, 1357–1707. Parliaments of Ireland, 1599–1800. London: His/Her Majesty's Stationery Office. OCLC 13112546.
- House of Lords (1779). Journals of the House of Lords (PDF). Vol. I. Dublin: William Sleater. OCLC 35009219. – 1634 to 1699
- Kearney, Hugh Francis (1959). Strafford in Ireland 1633–1641 – a Study in Absolutism. Manchester: Manchester University Press. OCLC 857142293.
- Mahaffy, Robert Pentland, ed. (1900). Calendar of the State Papers Relating to Ireland, of the Reign of Charles I. 1633–1647. London: His/Her Majesty's Stationery Office.
- McGrath, Brid (1997). A Biographical Dictionary of the Membership of the Irish House of Commons 1640 to 1641 (Ph.D.). Vol. 1. Dublin: Trinity College. hdl:2262/77206. – Parliaments & Biographies (PDF downloadable from given URL)
- Lord Mountmorres (1792a). The History of the Principal Transactions of the Irish Parliament from the Year 1634 to 1666. Vol. I. London: T. Cadell. OCLC 843863159. – House of Lords
- Lord Mountmorres (1792b). The History of the Principal Transactions of the Irish Parliament from the Year 1634 to 1666. Vol. II. London: T. Cadell. OCLC 843863159. – House of Commons
- Ó Siochrú, Micheál (October 2009). McGuire, James; Quinn, James (eds.). "MacCarthy, Donough". Dictionary of Irish Biography.
- Perceval-Maxwell, Michael (1994). The Outbreak of the Irish Rebellion of 1641. Montreal: McGill-Queen's University Press. ISBN 0-7735-1157-1. – (Preview)
- Wedgwood, Cicely Veronica (1961). Thomas Wentworth, First Earl of Strafford 1593–1641. A Revaluation. London: Jonathan Cape. OCLC 1068569885.
- Woolrych, Austin (2002). Britain in Revolution. Oxford: Oxford University Press. ISBN 0-19-820081-1.
