= 1st Irish Parliament of King Charles I =

Irish Parliament 1634–1635, the first of Charles I

The Parliament 1634–1635 was the first of the two Irish parliaments of Charles I. The main purpose was to raise money by taxation and to ratify the Graces, a bundle of concessions to Irish Catholic landowners. Six years of taxes were voted, but few of the graces were ratified.

== Background ==
Charles I, king of England, Scotland, and Ireland, summoned the Irish Parliament of 1634–1635 to put the Irish government on a sound financial footing. The preceding parliament had been the Parliament of 1613–1615, the only Irish parliament of James I. In this parliament James I had created more than 30 pocket boroughs under Protestant control. The Irish House of Commons of 1634 therefore had 254 members: 112 Catholic and 142 Protestant. In 1632 Charles I had appointed Thomas Wentworth (the future Earl of Strafford) as his lord deputy of Ireland. Wentworth had taken office in July 1633.

Irish Parliaments:
Monarch	#	Years	Chief governor (Note: The title "chief governor of Ireland" is a general term for the king's representative and head of the executive in Ireland. The actual title was either Lord Lieutenant (L.L.), Lord Deputy (L.D.), or Lord Justice.)	Remark
James I	1	1613–1614	Chichester, L.D.	The 1st with a Protestant majority
Charles I	1	1634–1635	Strafford, L.D. then L.L.	
Charles I	2	1640–1649	Strafford, L.D. then L.L.	
Charles I	2	1640–1649	Leicester, L.L.	
Charles I	2	1640–1649	Ormond, L.L.	

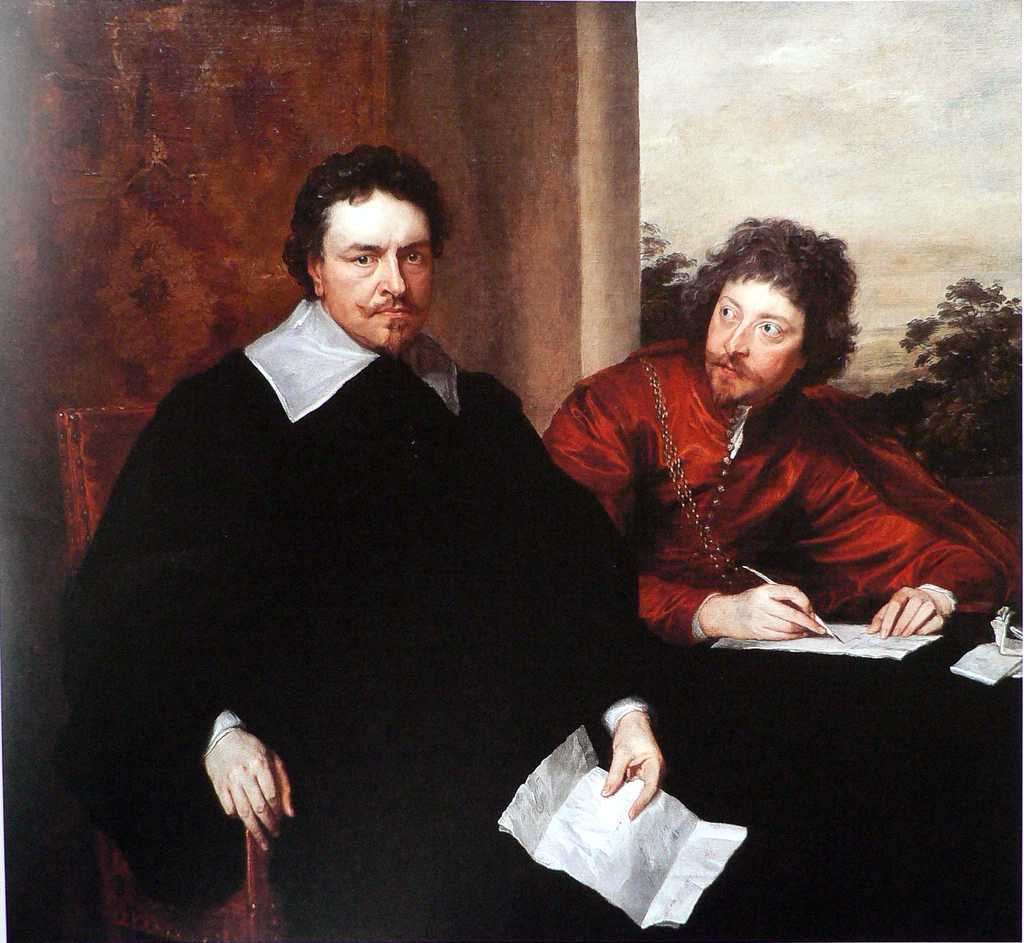
The Lord Deputy Thomas Wentworth

== Proceedings ==
During the parliament the King stayed in England and was represented at the parliament in Dublin by his lord deputy. Parliament was opened on 14 July 1634 at Dublin Castle by the lord deputy. Nathaniel Catelyn, one of the two members for Dublin City, was elected speaker.

=== Taxation ===
Wentworth insisted that subsidies needed to be attended to first. Six subsidies of £50,000 (about £9,700,000 in 2025) each, or according to another source £240,000 (about £46,700,000 in 2025) altogether, were voted by the Commons unanimously on 19 July 1634. These subsidies were approved by the Lords on 2 August, when the 1st session was closed and prorogued to the 4 November by the lord deputy.

=== The Graces ===
King Charles I had indicated in 1626 that he would concede certain rights to the Irish Catholics if paid well enough. These concessions are known as the Graces. At Whitehall in 1628 the King and a delegation of Irish noblemen had agreed on 51 articles. At the core of the Graces were land rights and religious freedom. The payment had been fixed at £120,000 sterling (about £28,000,000 in 2025) in three yearly instalments. The Irish Parliament should have confirmed the Graces promptly, but the then lord deputy, Lord Falkland, had never summoned that parliament. The parliament summoned in 1634 was the first Irish parliament since the proclamation of the Graces. Irish Catholics, therefore, expected to see them confirmed in this parliament while Wentworth expected trouble when he refused.

The ratification of the Graces was tabled afterwards. Of the 51 articles Wentworth let 10 be voted into law, the others would be left at the discretion of the government, except articles 24 and 25, concerning land tenure, which he rejected.

=== Other laws ===
The Catholic MPs expressed their anger by voting against any law later proposed by Wentworth and due to absenteeism among the Protestant MPs, the Catholics were able to vote several laws down. The government recalled the absent Protestant MPs, and the laws passed. Wentworth dissolved parliament on 18 April 1635.

Table of sessions
Session	Start	End	Remark
1st	14 Jul 1634	2 Aug 1634	Voted 6 subsidies unanimously
2nd	4 Nov 1634	15 Dec 1634	Legislation voted, including ratification of some of the Graces"
3rd	26 Jan 1635	18 Apr 1635	Legislation voted, including ratification of some of the Graces"

== See also ==
- List of acts of the Parliament of Ireland, 1600–1690
- List of parliaments of Ireland

== Notes and references ==
=== Sources ===
- Asch, Ronald G. (2004). "Wentworth, Thomas, first earl of Strafford (1593–1641)". In Matthew, Colin; Harrison, Brian (eds.). Oxford Dictionary of National Biography. Vol. 56. New York: Oxford University Press. pp. 142–157. ISBN 0-19-861408-X.
- Bagwell, Richard (1909). Ireland under the Stuarts and under the Interregnum. Vol. 1. London: Longmans, Green, and Co. OCLC 458582656. – 1603 to 1642
- Carte, Thomas (1851) [1st pub. 1736]. The Life of James Duke of Ormond. Vol. 1 (New ed.). Oxford: Oxford University Press. OCLC 1086656347. – 1613 to 1641
- Clarke, Aidan (1976). "Chapter 8: Selling Royal Favours, 1624–32". In Moody, Theodore William; Martin, F. X.; Byrne, Francis John (eds.). A New History of Ireland. Vol. 3. Oxford: Oxford University Press. pp. 233–242. ISBN 0-19-820242-3. – 1624 to 1632
- Cusack, M. F. (1871). A Compendium of Irish History. Boston: Patrick Donahoe. OCLC 1042465804.
- Gardiner, Samuel Rawson (1883). History of England from the Accession of James I to the Outbreak of the Civil War. Vol. 1. London: Longmans, Green & Co. OCLC 559091724. – 1603 to 1607
- Gardiner, Samuel Rawson (1884). History of England from the Accession of James I to the Outbreak of the Civil War. Vol. 8. London: Longmans, Green & Co. OCLC 559091724. – 1635 to 1639
- Gardiner, Samuel Rawson (1899). "Wentworth, Thomas, first Earl of Strafford (1593–1641)". In Lee, Sidney (ed.). Dictionary of National Biography. Vol. 60. London: Smith, Elder, & Co. pp. 268–283. OCLC 8544105.
- Gillespie, Raymond (2006). Seventeenth-Century Ireland: Making Ireland Modern. Dublin: Gill & MacMillan. ISBN 978-0-7171-3946-0.
- House of Lords (1779). Journals of the House of Lords (PDF). Vol. 1. Dublin: William Sleater. OCLC 35009219. – 1634 to 1699
- Joyce, Patrick Weston (1903). A Concise History of Ireland from the Earliest Times to 1837 (12th ed.). Dublin: M. H. Gill & Son. OCLC 815623752.
- Kearney, Hugh Francis (1959). Strafford in Ireland 1633–1641 – a Study in Absolutism. Manchester: Manchester University Press. OCLC 857142293.
- Kelsey, Sean (2004). "Cary, Henry, first viscount Falkland". In Matthew, Henry Colin Gray.; Harrison, Brian (eds.). Oxford Dictionary of National Biography. Vol. 10. New York: Oxford University Press. pp. 430–432. ISBN 978-0-1986-1360-2.
- MacNeill, John Gordon Swift (1917). The Constitutional and Parliamentary History of Ireland till the Union. Dublin: The Talbot Press. – Snippet view
- Lord Mountmorres (1792). The History of the Principal Transactions of the Irish Parliament from the Year 1634 to 1666. Vol. I. London: T. Cadell. OCLC 843863159. – House of Lords
- Wallace, Martin (1973). A Short History of Ireland. Newton Abbot, Devon: David & Charles. ISBN 978-0-7153-6306-5.
- Wedgwood, C. V. (1961). Thomas Wentworth, First Earl of Strafford 1593–1641. A Revaluation. London: Jonathan Cape. OCLC 1068569885.
- Wood, Herbert (1935). "The titles of the chief governors of Ireland". Bulletin of the Institute of Historical Research. 13 (37): 1–8. doi:10.1111/j.1468-2281.1935.tb00065.x.
