= Viscount Fermoy =

Viscount Fermoy was a title in the Peerage of Ireland. The title had a number of creations. Holders of the title, including members of the Roche family of Blackwater Castle in Castletownroche in County Cork, included:

- Maurice Roche (or De Rupe), sometimes known as "Maurice the mad", is recorded as the 1st (and sometimes 6th) Viscount Fermoy (c. 1550–1600)
- David Roche, 2nd (or 7th) Viscount Fermoy (1573–1635)
- Maurice Roche, 3rd (or 8th) Viscount Fermoy (1597–1670)

== See also ==
- Baron Fermoy
