= Charles Smith (topographer) =

Irish topographer and writer (1715–1762)

Charles Smith (1715–1762) was an Irish topographer and writer.

He was educated at Trinity College, Dublin. He qualified as a doctor and practised as an apothecary in Dungarvan, County Waterford.

In the 1730s, along with Walter Harris he discussed a scheme to compile and publish histories of all the Irish counties. The first of these, a history of County Down, jointly edited by Walter Harris and Charles Smith, was printed in 1744. Waterford and Cork followed, but then the society funding the venture broke up, so that he alone carried through the final volume, Kerry, in 1756.

From the 1730s, he was involved with the Physico-Historical Society and the Royal Dublin Society, both societies with similar aims, along with Robert Jocelyn, Samuel Madden, the philanthropist; Thomas Prior, the founder of the Royal Dublin Society; John Rutty the physician and naturalist; John Lodge, author of Peerage of Ireland and Walter Harris.

== See also ==
- Mervyn Archdall
- Castle Salem
