= Francis John Byrne =

Irish historian

- Born: 14 October 1934; Shanghai, China
- Died: 30 December 2017 (aged 83)
- Education: University College Dublin
- Occupation: Historian

Francis John Byrne (14 October 1934 – 30 December 2017) was an Irish historian.

Born in Shanghai where his father, a Dundalk man, captained a ship on the Yellow River, Byrne was evacuated with his mother to Australia on the outbreak of World War II. After the war, his mother returned to Ireland, where his father, who had survived internment in Japanese hands, returned to take up work as a harbour master in Howth.

Byrne attended Blackrock College in County Dublin where he learned Latin and Greek, to add to the Chinese he had learned in his Shanghai childhood. He studied Early Irish History at University College Dublin where he excelled, graduating with first class honours. He studied Paleography and Medieval Latin in Germany, and then lectured on Celtic languages in Sweden, before returning to University College in 1964 to take up a professorship.

Byrne's best known work is his Irish Kings and High-Kings (1973). He was joint editor of the Royal Irish Academy's New History of Ireland (9 volumes). A festschrift in his honour, Seanchas (1999), was published under the editorship of his former student Alfred P. Smyth.

He retired in 2000, and died in December 2017.

== Select bibliography ==
- Irish Kings and High-Kings. 3rd revised edition, Dublin: Four Courts Press, 2001. ISBN 978-1-85182-196-9
- Smyth, Alfred P. (ed.), Seanchas: Studies in Early and Medieval Irish Archaeology, History and Literature in Honour of Francis J. Byrne. Dublin: Four Courts, 1999. ISBN 978-1-85182-489-2
