= Robert Dunlop (historian) =

British historian

Robert Dunlop (12 March 1861 – 6 October 1930) was a British historian who specialised in the history of Ireland.

A lecturer in Irish history at the University of Manchester, Dunlop was a major contributor to The Cambridge Modern History and wrote a large number of articles for the Dictionary of National Biography.

== Early life ==
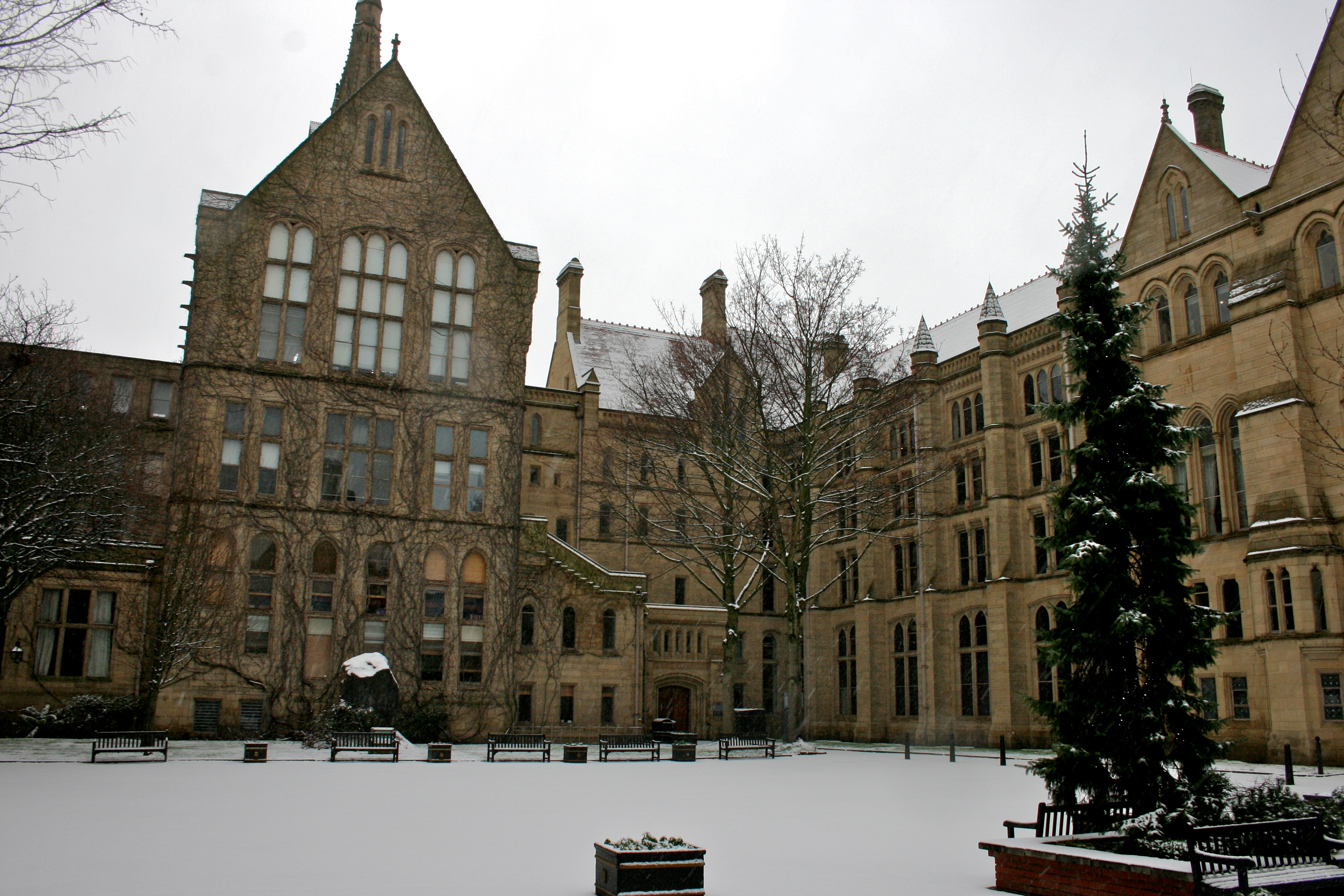
Owens College

Born in Rusholme, Manchester, Dunlop was the son of John Mair Dunlop and Emily Nairn, both of whom had been born in Scotland, and was baptised on 28 April 1861 at the Greenheys United Presbyterian Church, Coupland Street, Hulme. His father was a bank manager, and he had a younger brother, James Nairn Dunlop, who became a dentist, and two younger sisters, Jeanie and Jessie.

Dunlop grew up in Southport, Lancashire. He was educated at Owens College, Manchester, between 1879 and 1882, where in 1882 he took the honours degree of BA in history. In 1885 he graduated MA.

== Career ==
Dunlop's first published article, which was about the Irish Rebellion of 1641, appeared in the English Historical Review in 1886.

In 1888, Dunlop was elected to a Bishop Berkeley Fellowship of Owens College, worth £100 a year for two years, to support original research, and was encouraged by Adolphus Ward to continue with the history of Ireland as his field of study. His first significant work was to make a calendar of the documents in the Irish Record Office relating to the Cromwellian settlement of Ireland, plus some from Trinity College, Dublin. This work remained unpublished until 1913, but was made available to scholars in manuscript.

At the census of 1891, Dunlop was living in Kingston upon Thames with a wife born in Vienna, Josephine Dunlop, a six-month old son, Robert P. Dunlop, and his brother James.

Early in the twentieth century Dunlop was appointed as lecturer in Irish history at the University of Manchester and held the position for some ten years. He was the only major contributor on Ireland to The Cambridge Modern History, in which his chapters in the five volumes published between 1904 and 1910 amounted to a complete history of the country from the 16th century to 1910. He also wrote a large number of articles for the Dictionary of National Biography.

In 1908, Dunlop reviewed Alice Stopford Green’s The Making of Ireland and its Undoing, 1200–1600 and was critical of it. Dunlop objected to partisanship in history, and was satisfied with his own objectivity. He wrote on this point "Fortunately I have no theory to serve. Historically, Ireland is as remote to me as ancient Egypt. My only concern is to get at the truth." A survey of the sources for early modern Irish history has noted that Dunlop, unlike Mrs Green, made no use of documents written in the Irish language, even after some were made accessible by the Irish Texts Society.

By 1919, Dunlop had been living for several years in Austria, his wife's native land, and in February he wrote an article on the situation there following the Assembly elections of 1919, the first after the end of the First World War, won by the Social Democrats. He had suffered significant financial losses as a result of the war, and returned to England. He got little compensation, but his problems were relieved by a grant from the Royal Literary Fund, and in 1923 he returned to Austria, where he changed the focus of his interest in history. In April 1929 he wrote an article on "The Italianisation of the South Tyrol", and the same year he wrote to a friend that he was now concentrating on the history of Austria. However, he died there in October 1930, in Graz. His obituary in The Times called him "the authority on modern Irish history".

== Selected publications ==
- "The Depositions relating to the Irish Massacres of 1641", English Historical Review, Vol. 1 (1886), pp. 740–744
- "The Plantation of Munster, 1584–1589", English Historical Review, Vol. 3 (1888), pp. 250–269
- Some 150 contributions to the Dictionary of National Biography (1886–1900)
- Daniel O'Connell and the Revival of National Life in Ireland (New York: G. P. Putnam's Sons, 1900)
- "Ireland to the Settlement of Ulster", Chapter 18 of The Cambridge Modern History, Vol. III. The Wars of Religion (1904)
- "Sixteenth-Century Maps of Ireland", in English Historical Review, Vol. 20 (1905), pp. 309–337
- "Ireland from the Plantation of Ulster to the Cromwellian Settlement (1611–1659)", Chapter 18 of The Cambridge Modern History, IV. The Thirty Years' War (1906)
- "The Revolution and the Revolution Settlement in Great Britain: Ireland from the Restoration to the Age of Resumption (1660–1700)" Chapter 10 (3) of The Cambridge Modern History, V. The Age of Louis XIV (1908)
- "Ireland in the Eighteenth Century", Chapter 14 of The Cambridge Modern History, VI. The Eighteenth Century (1909)
- "Ireland and the Home Rule Movement", Chapter 4 of The Cambridge Modern History, VII. The Latest Age (1910)
- Ireland under the Commonwealth: Being a Selection of Documents Relating to the Government of Ireland from 1651 to 1659 (Manchester University Press, two volumes, 1913)
- "The Revolution in Vienna" in The Living Age, 22 February 1919, reprinted in Vol. 300 (1919), 449–451
- A History of Ireland (Oxford University Press, 1921)
- "Some Notes on Barbour’s Bruce, Books XIV-XVI and XVIII", in A. G. Little, F. M. Powicke, Essays in Medieval History Presented to Thomas Frederick Tout (Manchester University Press, 1925)
- "The Italianisation of the South Tyrol" (April 1929)
- "Austria: a Retrospect and a Forecast", Quarterly Review, January 1930
