= Jane Ohlmeyer =

Historian

Jane Helen Ohlmeyer, MRIA, is a historian and academic, specialising in early modern Irish and British history. She is the Erasmus Smith's Professor of Modern History (1762) at Trinity College Dublin and Chair of the Irish Research Council, which funds frontier research across all disciplines.

Ohlmeyer was the founding Head of the School of Histories and Humanities at Trinity College Dublin, Trinity's first vice-president for Global Relations (2011–14), and Director of the Trinity Long Room Hub Arts and Humanities Research Institute (2015–20).

Ohlmeyer has been the Principal Investigator (PI) or co-PI for 25 research and research infrastructure projects with awards totalling c. €22 million from national, European and international funders.

In addition to historical research, Ohlmeyer regularly speaks on topics that relate more generally to the importance of the arts and humanities, the value of inter- and trans-disciplinarity, educational policy, and digital humanities. She has commented on the barriers facing women in the university sector and launched a free Democracy Curriculum in 2020. She is a committed advocate of the public humanities and policy engagement and is a notable public commentator on contemporary issues, including Brexit.

In 2021, Ohlmeyer delivered the Ford Lectures on 'Ireland, Empire and the Early Modern World' at the University of Oxford. She was the eleventh woman to deliver the prestigious lectures since they were founded in 1896. Ohlmeyer was the first person from a university in Ireland to since F.S.L Lyons in 1977. Due to the COVID-19 pandemic, this was the first time the lectures were delivered online. The lectures are now available on the RTÉ website.

== Early life and education ==
Ohlmeyer was born in Zambia to a Northern Irish mother and a South African father, moving to Belfast in 1969. She read history as an undergraduate at the University of St Andrews before going on to complete an MA at the University of Illinois and a PhD at Trinity College Dublin in 1991.

== Career ==
Ohlmeyer was appointed Erasmus Smith's Professor of Modern History at Trinity College Dublin in 2003. Prior to that appointment, she held posts at the University of California at Santa Barbara, Yale University and, from 1995 to 2003, at the University of Aberdeen. Upon her promotion to Professor in 2000, Ohlmeyer was the first woman to hold a chair in History at the University of Aberdeen, and the first chair of Irish History in Scotland.

Ohlmeyer has taught undergraduate and postgraduate students at Trinity College Dublin, at Yale, the University of Aberdeen, New York University and Ashoka University in New Delhi. At Trinity, she has supervised 11 PhD students and mentored eight postdoctoral fellows and nine Marie Skłodowska-Curie Cofund Fellows. She has served as an external examiner for theses in the English and History Faculties at the Universities of Oxford, Cambridge, Edinburgh, New South Wales, Galway, UCD and Maynooth.

In 2015 Ohlmeyer was appointed Chair of the Irish Research Council. The Irish Research Council (IRC) awards competitive funding on the basis of research excellence. The council also advises the government on research-related policy issues, as well as lobbying ministers in Dublin and Brussels, and was the first funding agency in Ireland to publish a gender strategy and introduce gender-blind assessment. The Council introduced the #LoveIrishResearch social media campaign to empower Irish researchers to communicate why their research matters.

From 2015 to 2020 Ohlmeyer was Director of the Trinity Long Room Hub Arts and Humanities Research Institute, having previously worked with colleagues to develop the concept and secure funding (2008). The Trinity Long Room Hub advances research excellence in the arts and humanities; fosters innovation in research, including interdisciplinarity, and draws attention to issues of national and international importance through an extensive public humanities initiative. In 2020 Ohlmeyer led the institute's 10th-anniversary celebrations.

In 2011 Ohlmeyer was appointed Trinity's first Vice President for Global relations, a post she held until 2014. Ohlmeyer designed and implemented Trinity's "Global Relations Strategy".

Ohlmeyer has held visiting fellowships at the University of Oxford, Ashoka University, São Paulo University, São Paulo, Jawaharlal Nehru University, University of Cambridge, Folger Institute, New York University, École des hautes Études en Sciences Sociales and the Huntington Library.

She is member of the Royal Irish Academy, the Irish Manuscripts Commission and of a number of editorial and advisory boards including the Consortium of Humanities Centers and Institutes.

In 2021 she was considered for the role of Provost of the college when the position was being considered for one of three women, including Linda Hogan and Linda Doyle, making it the first time a woman was provost since the founding of the college.

== Research ==
Ohlmeyer is the author or editor of numerous articles and 13 books, including Volume 2 of The Cambridge History of Ireland, published in 2018. The Cambridge History of Ireland was launched in Dublin by President Michael D. Higgins, in London by former UK Prime Minister John Major and in Washington DC by President-elect Joe Biden.

In 2020 she published an edition of Edward Hyde, 1st Earl of Clarendon's A Short View of the State and Condition of the Kingdom of Ireland (Oxford, 2020).

In 2023 she published Making Empire: Ireland, Imperialism and the Early Modern World, based on James Ford Lectures given at the University of Oxford in 2021.

To date, Ohlmeyer has been the Principal Investigator (PI) or co-PI for 25 research and research infrastructure projects, with awards totalling €22 million including:

- SHAPE-ID (2018–21), an EU-funded project that aims to improve inter- and trans-disciplinary cooperation between the Arts, Humanities and Social Sciences (AHSS) and Science, Technology, Engineering and Mathematics (STEM) disciplines.
- Human+ (2020–25), a ground-breaking project co-funded by the European Commission's Horizon 2020 Marie Skłodowska-Curie Actions and undertaken in partnership with the Adapt Centre which places the human at the centre of technology innovation to serve the long-term and collective needs of society.
- The Global Humanities Institute on the 'Crises of Democracy' (2017–19), funded by the Mellon Foundation, brought together a consortium of humanities scholars spanning four continents to explore the various threats to democracy through the lens of cultural trauma.
- 1641 Deposition Project (2007-10), a flagship technology project which digitised 8,000 witness accounts from the 1641 rebellion, making these controversial documents available online in a fully Text Encoding Initiative (TEI) compliant format. The website was launched in 2010 by President Mary McAleese and Ian Paisley, Lord Bannside and a Research Impact Showcase was held to mark the tenth anniversary of the project on 22 October 2020. Ian Adamson, the once Honorary Historian of the Ulster Unionist party also accompanied Ian paisley and Jane to the symposium.

== Public engagement and advocacy ==
Ohlmeyer was closely involved in the development and launch of History Scotland, an illustrated and interdisciplinary quarterly magazine that is aimed at members of the general public. She has contributed to a number of television (BBC, RTÉ, TV3, Channel 4, Channel 5) and radio programmes (BBC Radio 4's In Our Time, PBS, Radio Scotland, RTÉ, Newstalk, Near FM) and is currently the executive producer for a 6-part documentary series, From That Small Island: The Story of the Irish.

As Director of the Trinity Long Room Hub, she developed the "Behind the Headlines" discussion series and hosted 25 discussions on pressing and complex issues.

Ohlmeyer regularly speaks on topics that relate more generally to the importance of the arts and humanities, the value of inter- and trans-disciplinarity, educational policy, and digital humanities. She has commented on the barriers facing women in the university sector and launched a free Democracy Curriculum in 2020. She is a committed advocate of the public humanities and policy engagement and is a notable public commentator on contemporary issues.

Ohlmeyer is also co-chair of the Royal Irish Academy's Brexit Taskforce, a group of academics from across Ireland assessing the impact that Brexit could have on research and education on the island.

== Honours ==
- 2021: The Ford Lectures on 'Ireland, Empire and the early modern world' at the History Faculty, University of Oxford
- 2020: Stand up for Research – Research Excellence Award, Trinity College Dublin
- 2018: Societal Impact – Innovation Award, Trinity College Dublin
- 2012-13: A 'Choice Outstanding Academic Title' for Making Ireland English
- 2011: Elected Member of the Royal Irish Academy
- 2015: Elected Fellow of Trinity College Dublin
- 1994: Civil War and Restoration in the Three Stuart Kingdoms American Conference on Irish Studies (ACIS) book prize for History and Social Sciences
- 1993: Civil War and Restoration in the Three Stuart Kingdoms The Whitfield Prize: awarded Proxime Accesit for the best book on British history published in the United Kingdom

== Selected works ==
- Ohlmeyer, Jane H. (1993). Civil War and Restoration in the Three Stuart Kingdoms: The Career of Randall MacDonnell, Marquis of Antrim, 1609-1683. Cambridge: Cambridge University Press. ISBN 978-0521419789.
- Ohlmeyer, Jane H., ed. (1995). Ireland from Independence to Occupation, 1641–1660. Cambridge: Cambridge University Press. ISBN 978-0521434799.
- Kenyon, John; Ohlmeyer, Jane, eds. (1998). The Civil Wars: A Military History of England, Scotland and Ireland, 1638-60. Oxford: Oxford University Press. ISBN 978-0198662228.
- Ohlmeyer, Jane, ed. (2000). Political Thought in Seventeenth-Century Ireland: Kingdom or Colony. Cambridge: Cambridge University Press. ISBN 978-0521650830.
- Ohlmeyer, Jane (2012). Making Ireland English: the Irish aristocracy in the seventeenth century. New Haven: Yale University Press. ISBN 978-0300118346.
- Ohlmeyer, Jane, ed. (2018). The Cambridge History of Ireland: Volume 2, 1550–1730. Cambridge: Cambridge University Press. ISBN 978-1107117631.
- Ohlmeyer, Jane, ed. (2020). A Short View of the State and Condition of the Kingdom of Ireland. Oxford: Oxford University Press. ISBN 9780198791072.
- Ohlmeyer, Jane (2023). Making Empire: Ireland, Imperialism and the Early Modern World. Oxford University Press.

Ohlmeyer has published 13 academic books (2 monographs and 11 edited or co-edited), over forty articles and was one of the four co-editors of the Irish Manuscripts Commission The 1641 Depositions in 12 volumes (2014–20).
