= Dictionary of Irish Biography =

Multi-volume biographical collection

- Publisher: Cambridge University Press
- Publication date: November 2009
- ISBN: 9780521633314

The Dictionary of Irish Biography (DIB) is a biographical dictionary of notable Irish people and people not born in the country who had notable careers in Ireland, including both Northern Ireland and the Republic of Ireland.

== History ==
The work was supervised by a board of editors which included the historian Edith Johnston.

It was published as a nine-volume set in 2009 by Cambridge University Press in collaboration with the Royal Irish Academy (RIA), and contained about 9,000 entries. The 2009 version of the dictionary was also published online via a digital subscription and was predominantly used by academics, researchers, and civil servants. An online version is now open access, having been launched on 17 March 2021 (St. Patrick's Day), and new entries are added to that version periodically. Funding is from the Higher Education Authority, Department of Foreign Affairs, and Dublin City Council Libraries. The biographies range from 200 to 15,000 words in length, with about 11,000 entries in total as of March 2021.

For subjects to be eligible for inclusion, they must have been dead for at least five years and must either be born on the island of Ireland or have had a significant career there.
