= Colin Matthew =

British historian (1941–1999)

Professor Colin Matthew FRHistS
- Born: Henry Colin Gray Matthew; 15 January 1941; Inverness, Scotland
- Died: 29 October 1999 (aged 58); Oxford, England
- Occupations: Historian and academic
- Spouse: Sue Ann Curry
- Awards: Wolfson History Prize

Academic background
- Education: Edinburgh Academy; Sedbergh School; Christ Church, Oxford

Academic work
- Discipline: History
- Sub-discipline: Political history; William Ewart Gladstone
- Institutions: Christ Church, Oxford; St Hugh's College, Oxford

Henry Colin Gray Matthew FRHistS (15 January 1941 – 29 October 1999) was a British historian and academic. He was an editor of the Oxford Dictionary of National Biography and editor of the diaries of William Ewart Gladstone.

== Early life ==
Matthew was born in Inverness on 15 January 1941. He was educated at Edinburgh Academy and later at the English public school, Sedbergh. He proceeded to Christ Church in the University of Oxford in 1960 to read Modern History. He graduated Bachelor of Arts (BA) in 1963.

== Academic career ==
In 1963, Matthew moved to work as a teacher in what is now Tanzania in East Africa, where he met his American wife Sue Ann Curry (born 1941). They moved to Oxford in 1966, where they married. Matthew began first an uncompleted diploma in politics and economics, and then a doctorate on the imperial wing of the Liberal Party in the 1890s and 1900s, completed in 1970.

In 1970, Matthew was appointed lecturer in Gladstone studies at Christ Church, Oxford, a post tied to the assistant editorship of the Gladstone Diaries, then being prepared for publication by M. R. D. Foot. In 1972 Matthew succeeded Foot as the sole editor, and completed the project. In 1978 Matthew was elected fellow and tutor in modern history at St Hugh's College, Oxford. He was made a full professor in 1992.

When Oxford University Press proposed a revision of the Dictionary of National Biography in the early 1990s, Matthew's work on the Gladstone Diaries recommended him for the position. He began work in 1992 and devised the editorial structure and guidelines for the dictionary, as well as writing or revising several hundred articles for the work. Other editorial roles included chairing the publications committee of Oxford Historical Monographs and membership of the Royal Historical Manuscripts Commission.

Matthew died from a heart attack in Oxford on 29 October 1999. The dictionary was published in 2004 following Matthew's plan.

== Honours and memorials ==
Matthew was elected a Fellow of the Royal Historical Society in 1976 and served as the society's Literary Director from 1985-1989 and Vice-President from 1993-1997. After his death the society established the annual Colin Matthew Memorial Lecture for the Public Understanding of History in his memory, co-hosted with Gresham College.

The History Faculty building at the University of Oxford contains a room named after Matthew. St Hugh's College also maintains a travel fund in Matthew's name available to all students at the University of Oxford to undertake historical research.
