= Brian Harrison (historian) =

British historian and academic (born 1937)

Sir Brian Harrison FBA FRHistS
- Born: 9 July 1937 (age 89)
- Occupations: Historian and academic
- Title: Professor of Modern History
- Spouse: Vicky Greggain (m. 1967)

Academic background
- Education: Merchant Taylors' School, Northwood
- Alma mater: St John's College, Oxford
- Thesis: The temperance question in England, 1829-1869 (1966)
- Doctoral advisor: Peter Mathias

Academic work
- Discipline: History
- Sub-discipline: Modern history; British history; social history; political history
- Institutions: Corpus Christi College, Oxford; Oxford Dictionary of National Biography

Sir Brian Howard Harrison (born 9 July 1937) is a British historian and academic. From 1996 to 2004, he was Professor of Modern History at the University of Oxford. From 2000 to 2004, he was also the editor of the Oxford Dictionary of National Biography.

== Early life, family and education ==
Harrison was born on 9 July 1937. He was educated at Merchant Taylors' School, Northwood, an independent school in London. From 1956 to 1958, between school and university, he undertook his national service with the Malta Signal Squadron.

He studied modern history at St John's College, Oxford, graduating with a first class honours Bachelor of Arts (BA) degree in 1961: as per tradition, his BA was promoted to a Master of Arts (MA Oxon) degree. From 1961-4 he was a senior scholar at St. Antony's College, Oxford, and from 1964-7 he was a Junior Research Fellow at Nuffield College, Oxford, where in 1966, he completed his D.Phil. thesis The temperance question in England, 1829–1869. The thesis was supervised by Peter Mathias.

== Academic career ==
Harrison was Professor of Modern History at the University of Oxford from 1996 to 2004. He was additionally the editor of Oxford Dictionary of National Biography from January 2000 to September 2004. Since 2004, he has been an emeritus fellow of Corpus Christi College, Oxford.

Harrison has published extensively on British social and political history from the 1790s to the present. His first book was Drink and the Victorians. The Temperance Question in England 1815–1872, based on his doctoral thesis. His most recent publications are two volumes in the New Oxford History of England series covering British history from 1951.

National Life Stories conducted an oral history interview (C1149/24) with Harrison in 2012 for its Oral History of Oral History collection held by the British Library. Harrison also did a video interview with the Cambridge historian and social anthropologist Alan Macfarlane in 2012, which was also published in prose format.

Between 1974 and 1981 Harrison conducted a series of oral history interviews with surviving suffrage campaigners, their relatives and employees, known as The Suffrage Interviews, or Oral evidence on the suffragette and suffragist movements: the Brian Harrison interviews. The recordings were deposited with The Women's Library in 1981, and are now available online via The British Library of Political and Economic Science. The Library is working on a Wikidata project, WikiProject LSESuffrageInterviewsProject, which seeks to explore connections between individuals and organizations mentioned within the collection, and make the resource accessible to researchers in new ways.

== Personal life ==
In 1967, Harrison married Vicky Greggain. She is a retired administrator who worked in the public and charitable sectors, including as executive secretary/chief executive) of the Wolfson Foundation (1997–2006).

== Honours ==
Harrison was appointed Knight Bachelor in the 2005 New Year Honours for "services to scholarship". He was elected a Fellow of the British Academy (FBA) on 30 July 2005. He is also an elected fellow of the Royal Historical Society (FRHistS).

A book of essays, Reform and its Complexities in Modern Britain: Essays Inspired by Sir Brian Harrison, was published in his honour in 2022.

== Selected works ==
- Harrison, Brian Howard (1971). Drink and the Victorians: the temperance question in England 1815–1872. London: Faber and Faber. ISBN 978-0-571-09381-6.
- Harrison, Brian Howard (1978). Separate spheres: the opposition to women's suffrage in Britain. Croom Helm social history series. London: Croom Helm. ISBN 978-0-85664-689-8.
- Harrison, Brian Howard (1982). Peaceable kingdom: stability and change in modern Britain. Oxford : New York: Clarendon Press; Oxford University Press. ISBN 978-0-19-822603-1.
- Harrison, Brian Howard (1987). Prudent revolutionaries: portraits of British feminists between the wars. Oxford [Oxfordshire] : New York: Clarendon Press; Oxford University Press. ISBN 978-0-19-820119-9.
- Harrison, Brian Howard (1996). The transformation of British politics, 1860–1995. Oxford; New York: Oxford University Press. ISBN 978-0-19-873121-4.
- Harrison, Brian Howard (2009). Seeking a role: the United Kingdom, 1951–1970. New Oxford history of England. Oxford : New York: Clarendon Press; Oxford University Press. ISBN 978-0-19-820476-3. OCLC 263498309.
- Harrison, Brian Howard (2010). Finding a role? the United Kingdom, 1970–1990. The new Oxford history of England. Oxford : Oxford; New York: Clarendon Press; Oxford University Press. ISBN 978-0-19-954875-0. OCLC 458730398.
- Harrison, Brian Howard (2026). Yesterday: The United Kingdom from Thatcher to Covid. Oxford : Princeton, New Jersey: Princeton University Press. ISBN 978-0-69-126987-0.
