= Donough MacCarty, 1st Earl of Clancarty =

Irish soldier and politician (1594–1665)

Donough MacCarty
- Earl of Clancarty
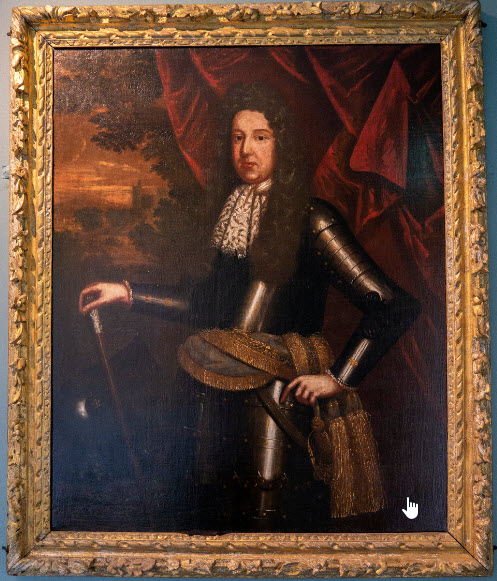
- Detail from the portrait below
- Tenure: 1658–1665
- Predecessor: Charles, 1st Viscount Muskerry
- Successor: Charles James, 2nd Earl of Clancarty (an infant)
- Born: 1594
- Died: 4 or 5 August 1665; London
- Spouse: Eleanor Butler
- Issue Detail: Charles, Callaghan, Justin, Helen, & others
- Father: Charles, 1st Viscount Muskerry
- Mother: Margaret O'Brien

Sir Donough MacCarty, (Note: His first name is variously spelled Donough Donogh, Donoch, or Donagh. His family name is variously spelled MacCarty, MacCarthy, McCarthy, M'Carthy, M'Carty, or Mc Carthy.) 1st Earl of Clancarty (1594–1665), was an Irish soldier and politician. He succeeded his father as 2nd Viscount Muskerry (Note: His title as viscount is spelled Muskerry in recent sources, but some older ones use Muskery, Muskry, Musgry, or Muscry.) in 1641. He rebelled against the government and joined the Irish Catholic Confederation, demanding religious freedom as a Catholic and defending the rights of the Gaelic nobility. Later, he supported the King against his Parliamentarian enemies during the Cromwellian conquest of Ireland.

He sat in the House of Commons of the Irish parliaments of 1634–1635 and 1640–1649 where he opposed Strafford, King Charles I's authoritarian viceroy. (Note: Viceroy or "chief governor of Ireland" are general terms for the king's representative and head of the executive in Ireland. Wentworth's (later Strafford's) title was first lord deputy and then lord lieutenant.) In 1642, he sided with the Irish Rebellion when it reached his estates in Munster. He fought for the insurgents at the Siege of Limerick and the Battle of Liscarroll. He joined the Irish Catholic Confederates and sat on their Supreme Council. Having fought in the Irish Confederate Wars, he negotiated the Cessation of 1643, a cease-fire between the Confederates and the King. He tried to transform this cease-fire into a permanent peace and was the leader of the Confederates' peace party, which opposed the clerical faction led by Rinuccini, the papal nuncio. Together with President Mountgarret, he negotiated the Glamorgan Peace in 1645, which was disavowed by the King. In 1646 he captured Bunratty Castle from the Parliamentarians and negotiated the First Ormond Peace, which was rejected by Rinuccini, who excommunicated him. During the Cromwellian conquest, he lost the Battle of Knocknaclashy in 1651 but held on until 1652, defending Ross Castle against Edmund Ludlow. He was one of the last to surrender.

In 1653 during the Commonwealth he stood trial for war crimes but was acquitted. In exile on the continent, Charles II created him Earl of Clancarty. He recovered his lands at the restoration of the monarchy in 1660.

Family tree

Donough MacCarty with wife, parents, and other selected relatives. (Note: This family tree is based on three graphic trees and on written genealogies of the Earls of Clancarty, the MacCarthy of Muskerry family, the Earls of Thomond, and the Earls of Ormond. Also see the list of children in the text.)

Donogh; O'Brien; 4th Earl; Thomond d. 1624	Cormac; MacDermot; 16th Lord; 1552–1616	David; Roche; 7th Viscount; Fermoy; 1573–1635
Margaret; O'Brien m. 1590	Charles; 1st Viscount; Muskerry d. 1641	Ellen; Roche
Donough; 1st Earl; Clancarty; 1594–1665	Eleanor; Butler; 1612–1682	James; 1st Duke; 1610–1688
Charles; Viscount; Muskerry c. 1633 – 1665 d.v.p.*	Margaret; Bourke d. 1698	Callaghan; 3rd Earl d. 1676	Justin; Viscount; Mountcashel c. 1643 – 1694
Charles James; 2nd Earl; 1663–1666 infant	Donough; 4th Earl; 1668–1734	Elizabeth; Spencer; 1671–1704

Legend

XXX	Subject of the article	XXX	Lords & Viscounts Muskerry, as well as Earls of Clancarty

XXX	Earls & dukes of Ormond	XXX	Earls of Thomond	XXX	Viscounts; Fermoy

*d.v.p. = predeceased his father (decessit vita patris)

== Birth and origins ==
Donough MacCarty was born in 1594 in County Cork, most likely at Blarney Castle or Macroom Castle, residences of his parents. He was the second but eldest surviving son of Charles (alias Cormac Oge) MacCarthy and his first wife Margaret O'Brien. His father was at that time known as Sir Charles MacCarthy while his paternal grandfather, Cormac MacDermot MacCarthy, held the title as 16th Lord of Muskerry (Note: His grandfather is also counted as the 17th Lord of Muskerry.) and owned the ancestral land covering large parts of central County Cork. His father's family were the MacCarthys of Muskerry, a Gaelic Irish dynasty that had branched from the MacCarthy-Mor line in the 14th century when a younger son received Muskerry as appanage.

Donough's mother was the eldest daughter of Donogh O'Brien, 4th Earl of Thomond. Donough was named for this grandfather (there were no Donoughs in the line of the MacCarthy of Muskerry). The name is an anglicised, shortened form of the Gaelic first name Donnchadh. Her family, the O'Briens, were another Gaelic Irish dynasty that descended from Brian Boru, medieval high king of Ireland.

His parents had married about 1590. He was one of seven siblings (two brothers (Note: His elder brother Cormac, probably intellectually disabled, died young predeceasing his father.) and five sisters). See the list in his father's article.

=== Religion ===
Although most Irish remained Catholics under the Protestant monarchs Henry VIII and Queen Elizabeth, both of MacCarty's grandfathers were Protestants. His paternal grandfather, Cormac MacDermot MacCarthy, had conformed to the established religion. MacCarty's maternal grandfather, Donogh O'Brien, 4th Earl of Thomond, had been brought up as Protestant at the English court. MacCarty's father seems to have been a Protestant in his youth but later became Catholic. (Note: According to O'Hart, Charles MacDermot MacCarthy (Donough's father) studied at Oxford University. Indeed a Charles MacCarty matriculated on 2 February 1602, aged 14, at Broadgates Hall, a precursor of Pembroke College. However, this date and age make his birth year 1587 or 1588, too late to marry in 1590 and have a son in 1594. Whoever this student was, he must have been a Protestant as Catholics were not accepted at Oxford University in his time.)

== Early life, marriage, and children ==
When MacCarty's mother died, his father remarried to Ellen Roche. She was the eldest daughter of David Roche, 7th Viscount Fermoy and widow of Donal MacCarthy Reagh of Kilbrittain, who had died in 1636. None of the cited works mentions children from his father's second marriage. MacCarty's stepmother's father was a zealous Catholic but a loyal supporter of the government.

In 1616 MacCarty's father succeeded as the 17th Lord of Muskerry. In 1628 King Charles I created MacCarty's father Baron Blarney and Viscount Muskerry. The titles were probably purchased. They had a special remainder that designated Donough as successor, excluding his elder brother, who was alive at the time but probably had an intellectual disability.

MacCarty married Eleanor Butler (Note: Recent sources call MacCarty's wife Eleanor, but some older ones call her Helena or Ellen. Her younger sister who married Sir Andrew Aylmer was also known as Eleanor.) some time before 1633 as their eldest son was born in 1633 or 1634. (Note: MacCarty's eldest son, Charles (or Cormac), was born between 4 June 1633 and 3 June 1634 as he died on 3 June 1635, aged 31.) She was a Catholic, the eldest daughter of Thomas Butler, Viscount Thurles. The Butlers were an Old English family descending from Theobald Walter, who came to Ireland during the reign of King Henry II. MacCarty was already in his late thirties while she was about twenty. (Note: Her age when she married (about 20) can be deduced as John Lodge states that she died in April 1682 aged 70.) He had been married before and had a son Donall from this wife, but this earlier marriage seems to have been ignored by his family. (Note: This marriage is mentioned by John O'Hart but not by Bernard Burke, George Edward Cokayne, and Louis Lainé.) His marriage to Eleanor made him a brother-in-law of James Butler, who succeeded as 12th Earl of Ormond in 1633, just before or just after MacCarty's marriage. Ormond was a Protestant, as he had been brought up in England.

Donough and Eleanor had three sons:

1. Charles (1633 or 1634 – 1665), also called Cormac, predeceased his father, being slain at sea in the Battle of Lowestoft
2. Callaghan (d. 1676), succeeded his elder brother's infant son, Charles James, as the 3rd Earl of Clancarty
3. Justin (c. 1643 – 1694), fought for the Jacobites and became Viscount Mountcashel

—and two daughters:

1. Helen (d. 1722), became countess of Clanricarde. She married 1st Sir John FitzGerald of Dromana and 2ndly William Burke, 7th Earl of Clanricarde.
2. Margaret (d. 1704), became countess of Fingall by marrying Luke Plunket, 3rd Earl of Fingall

== House of Commons ==
When Charles I summoned the Irish Parliament of 1634–1635, MacCarty, already in his forties, stood for County Cork and was elected as one of its two "knights of the shire" as county MPs were then called. He had been knighted in 1634. The Lord Deputy of Ireland, Thomas Wentworth (the future Lord Strafford) asked to vote taxes: six subsidies of £50,000 (equivalent to about £9,700,000 in 2025) were passed unanimously. The parliament also belatedly and incompletely ratified the Graces of 1628, in which the King conceded rights for money.

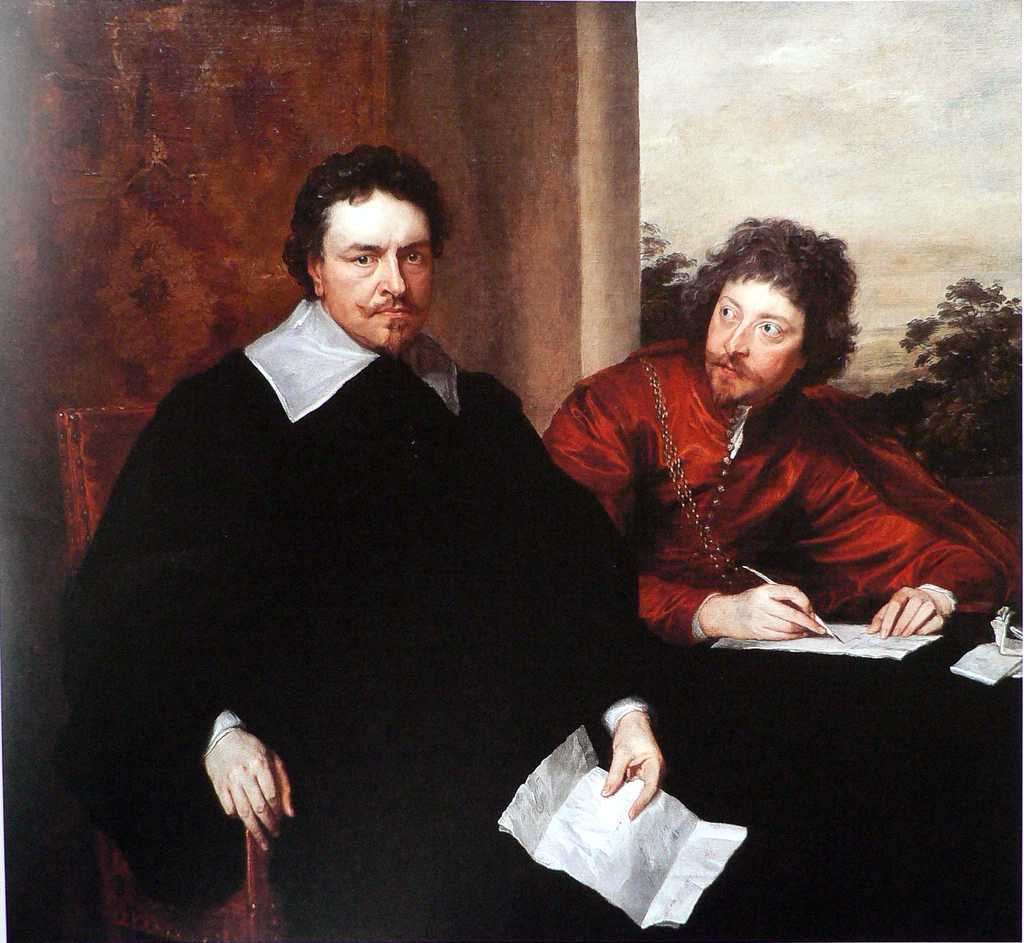
Thomas Wentworth, 1st Earl of Strafford

MacCarty was re-elected for County Cork to the Irish Parliament of 1640–1649. (Note: Also called the "Parliament of 1639–1648" as its start date and end date are both affected by the shift in the start of the year from 25 March to 1 January in the calendar reform of 1750. The opening date, the 16 March 1640, was still in 1639 according to the Old Style (O.S.) calendar, in force in Great Britain and Ireland at the time, under which each year ended on 5 April. Similarly, the end date, 30 January 1649 (the execution of Charles I), was still in 1648 according to O.S.) The parliamentary records list him as a knight, but about 1638 his father had bought him a baronetcy of Nova Scotia. The King sold these for 3,000 merk Scots each or £166 13s. 4d. sterling (Note: The merk Scots was worth 2/3 of a pound Scots, which in turn was worth 1/12 of a pound sterling.) (equivalent to about £299,000 in 2025). Under Strafford's guidance, the parliament unanimously voted four subsidies of £45,000 (equivalent to about £9,500,000 in 2025) to raise an Irish army of 9,000 for use against the Scots in the Second Bishops' War.

In April Strafford left Ireland to advise the King during the Short Parliament at Westminster. The Irish Commons saw their chance to complain about Strafford's authoritarian regime. They formed a committee for grievances of which MacCarty was a member. The committee prepared a remonstrance, called the November Petition, which was signed by all its members. The petition was then voted and approved by the Commons. MacCarty also was part of the delegation of 13 MPs that went to London in November to submit the petition to the King. The Lords sent a separate delegation for their grievances. MacCarty's father was part of it.

== Viscount Muskerry ==
In February 1641, MacCarty's father, aged about 70, died in London during his parliamentary mission. He was buried in Westminster Abbey. MacCarty succeeded as 2nd Viscount Muskerry. He lost his seat in the Commons where he was replaced by Redmond Roche, an uncle by his stepmother. As his ailing elder brother had died some time before, the title's special remainder did not need to be invoked. In March when Strafford was tried by the English House of Lords, Muskerry gave evidence that Strafford had prevented Irish people from seeing the King. When he came back to Dublin, Muskerry took his seat in the Irish House of Lords.

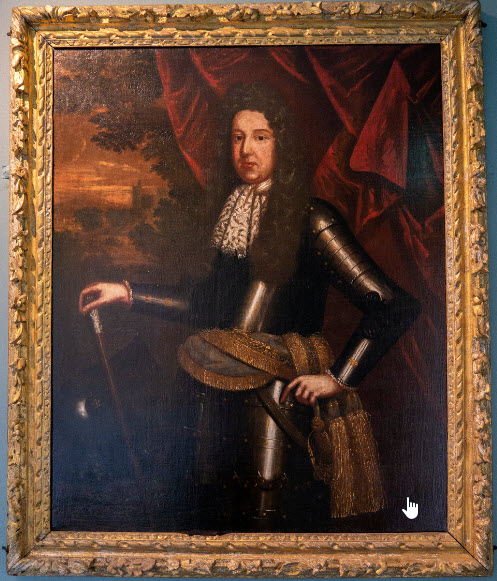
Muskerry as army general

== Irish wars ==
Ireland suffered 11 years of war from 1641 to 1652, which can be divided into the Rebellion of 1641, the Confederate Wars, and the Cromwellian Conquest. This Eleven Year War or Eleven Years War was a theatre of the Wars of the Three Kingdoms, also known as the British Civil Wars.

=== Rebellion ===
Seeing the King weak and trying to oppose plantations, Sir Phelim O'Neill launched the Rebellion from the northern province of Ulster in October 1641. He pretended, in his Proclamation of Dungannon, to have a royal commission sanctioning his actions. In Munster Muskerry socialised with Richard Boyle, 1st Earl of Cork, an English Protestant established in Ireland, with whom he had opposed Strafford. News of the rebellion reached Lord Cork at a dinner at Castlelyons where David Barry, 1st Earl of Barrymore entertained Muskerry and Cork's son Roger, Lord Broghill. Barrymore was an Irish Protestant and Cork's son-in-law. Muskerry would later oppose Barrymore and Broghill in battle, but in February 1642 Muskerry still sided with Sir William St Leger, Lord President of Munster, against the insurgents. Muskerry offered to raise an armed force of his tenants and dependants to maintain law and order. He and his wife tried to save Protestants fleeing from the insurgents. In January 1642 the Munster insurgents under Maurice Roche, 8th Viscount Fermoy besieged Lord Cork in Youghal.

However, the rebellion was gaining ground, and on 2 March, (Note: Muskerry changed sides on Ash Wednesday 1642. Calculations with the Easter Calculator of the University of Utrecht or that of the IMCCE show that Ash Wednesday fell on 2 March in 1642.) Muskerry changed sides, to defend the Catholic faith and the King as he explained on 17 March in a letter to Barrymore. Muskerry believed Phelim O'Neill acted under a royal warrant, but the King had already denounced the Irish insurgents as traitors in January. Hearing of his defection, the Irish Parliament declared Muskerry's estates forfeit. He lost the Dublin townhouse that his father had built about 1640, but the government could not seize his Munster estates.

Like many Catholic royalists, Muskerry imagined Charles could be convinced to accept Catholicism in Ireland as he accepted Presbyterianism in Scotland. He was also prompted to take up arms by the atrocities committed by William St Leger against the Catholic population and by the approach of Richard Butler, 3rd Viscount Mountgarret with his rebel army. Muskerry refused to serve under Mountgarret and competed for the leadership in Munster with Fermoy, an uncle by his stepmother. Fermoy had led the rebellion in Munster before Muskerry joined and outclassed him in terms of precedence, (Note: Fermoy and Muskerry were both viscounts, but the Muskerry viscountcy had only been created in 1628, whereas the Fermoy viscountcy was much older.) but Muskerry was richer. At a meeting of the leaders at Blarney, Garret Barry, a veteran of the Spanish Army of Flanders, was made general of the Munster insurgents' army as a compromise. Muskerry was his second-in-command.

In March and April, Muskerry and Fermoy with 4,000 men unsuccessfully besieged St Leger in Cork City. On 13 April Murrough O'Brien, 6th Baron Inchiquin, an Irish Protestant, lifted the siege by driving the insurgents from their base at Rochfordstown. Muskerry lost his armour, tent, and trunks in this action. He and his lady stayed nearby at Blarney Castle at the time. On 16 May, Muskerry and Fermoy captured Barrymore Castle at Castlelyons, Barrymore's seat. St Leger died on 2 July, and Inchiquin, the vice-president, took over the command of the government forces in Munster.

==== Siege of Limerick ====
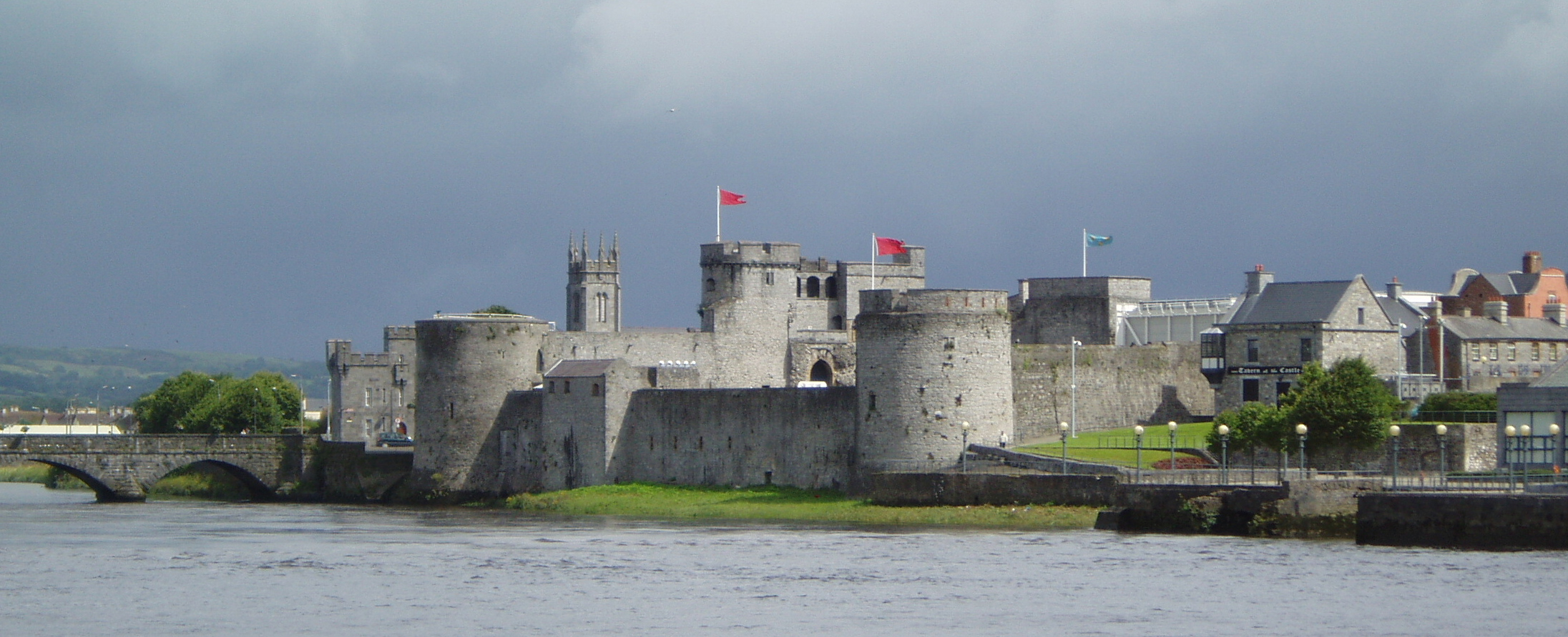
Limerick Castle on the River Shannon

In May and June 1642, Muskerry, Garret Barry, Patrick Purcell of Croagh, and Fermoy attacked Limerick. The town opened its gates willingly, but the Protestants defended King John's Castle in the Siege of Limerick. They were led by George Courtenay, 1st Baronet, of Newcastle, who was the constable of Limerick Castle.

Muskerry had a cannon placed on the tower of St Mary's Cathedral, which overlooked the castle. The besiegers attacked the castle's eastern wall and the bastion on its south-east corner by digging mines. The castle surrendered on 21 June and Muskerry took possession. The insurgents had already attacked castles in the Connello area west of Limerick, which had been settled with English during the Plantation of Munster. On 26 March Patrick Purcell had laid siege to Castletown, defended by Hardress Waller, the future Cromwellian general. The castle fell in May. In July, Muskerry and Patrick Purcell used artillery, captured at King John's Castle, to take Kilfinny, defended by Elizabeth Dowdall, Waller's mother-in-law.

==== Siege and Battle of Liscarroll ====
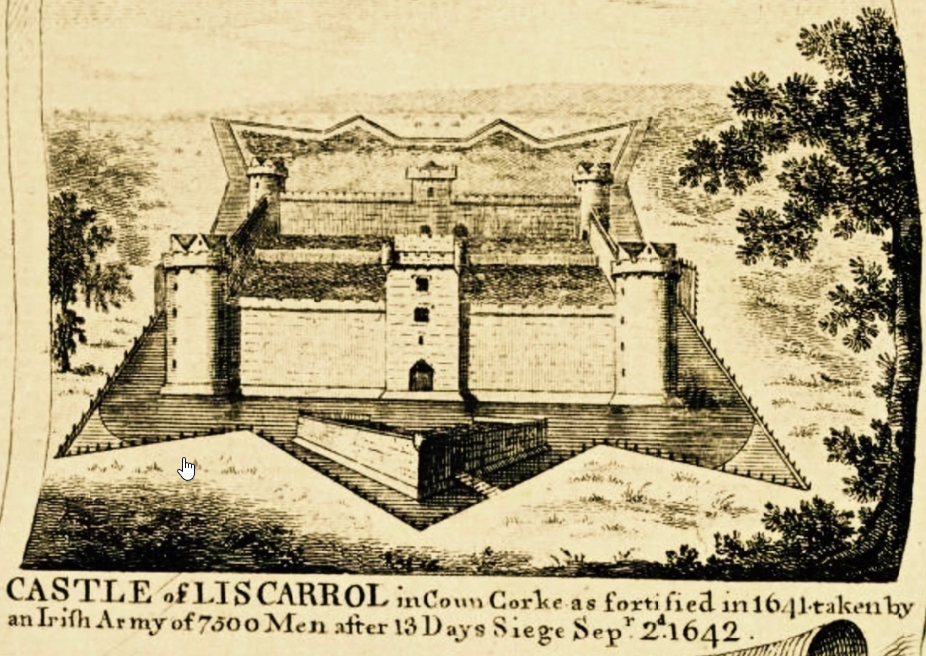
Liscarroll Castle, captured by Muskerry the day before the battle

The Munster insurgents then attacked the castles of Sir Philip Perceval. In the summer of 1642 Muskerry took Annagh Castle, County Tipperary, and in August besieged Liscarroll Castle, County Cork. The castle surrendered on 2 September. (Note: The dates given for the sieges of Annagh and Liscarroll castles are confusing, but it is sure the sieges happened in the summer of 1642 and that Liscarrol fell on 2 September.) The next day Inchiquin with his army appeared before the castle. Despite inferior numbers Inchiquin defeated the insurgents under General Garret Barry in the ensuing Battle of Liscarroll. Muskerry allegedly panicked, fled, and caused others to flee. His Protestant acquaintance Barrymore died in September, supposedly of wounds received in the battle.

=== Confederation ===
In 1642 the insurgents organised themselves in the Irish Catholic Confederation. In May the Catholic Church declared the war lawful. An oath of association was dawn up. In October Muskerry attended the first Confederate General Assembly at Kilkenny where Mountgarret was elected president of the Confederation. Muskerry was not elected to the Supreme Council, but his rival Fermoy was. Garret Barry was made general of the Munster Army, despite his recent defeat and advanced age. Barry seems to have held the position until his death in March 1646 in Limerick, but others commanded in his stead. In 1643 Muskerry and Fermoy were both elected to the Supreme Council. (Note: Authors agree that Muskerry and Fermoy sat together in a Supreme Council in 1643. According to Cregan (1995) and Ó Siochrú (1997) this was the Second Supreme Council, May to November 1643, but McGrath (1997) and Jane Ohlmeyer (2004) maintain it was the third, November 1643 to July 1644.)

Muskerry commanded the infantry at the Battle of Cloughleagh on 4 June 1643 where the Irish cavalry under James Tuchet, 3rd Earl of Castlehaven, routed a detachment of Inchiquin's troops under Sir Charles Vavasour, 1st Baronet, of Killingthorpe, who had taken the Cloughleagh Tower House near Fermoy the day before. Muskerry with the infantry arrived only after the decisive cavalry charge. Castlehaven considered him slow and called him "the old general".

Later that year, Muskerry led the Munster Army in an offensive against Inchiquin in County Waterford. Lieutenant-Colonel, Patrick Purcell, unsuccessfully besieged Lismore Castle, the seat of the Earls of Cork. Muskerry was about to take Cappoquin but engaged in parleys and was outwitted by Inchiquin, who delayed the town's surrender until September when the cease-fire ended the war.

==== Cessation and Oxford conference ====
Muskerry, like most of the magnates among the Confederates, was afraid to lose title and land when the King regained control. He therefore adhered to a faction within the Confederates, called the peace party or the Ormondists, that sought an agreement that would protect against such a loss. The King, on the other hand, sought peace with the Confederates to be able to withdraw troops from Ireland for use in the English Civil War. In 1643, the King asked Ormond to open talks with the Confederates. On 15 September 1643 at Sigginstown, Strafford's unfinished house, the Confederates signed a cease-fire with Ormond, called the "Cessation". Muskerry was one of the signatories. The Confederates agreed to pay the King £30,000 (equivalent to about £6,000,000 in 2025) in several instalments. In return, the Confederates gained some degree of diplomatic recognition. The articles of the Cessation gave Lismore Castle and Cappoquin to Inchiquin.

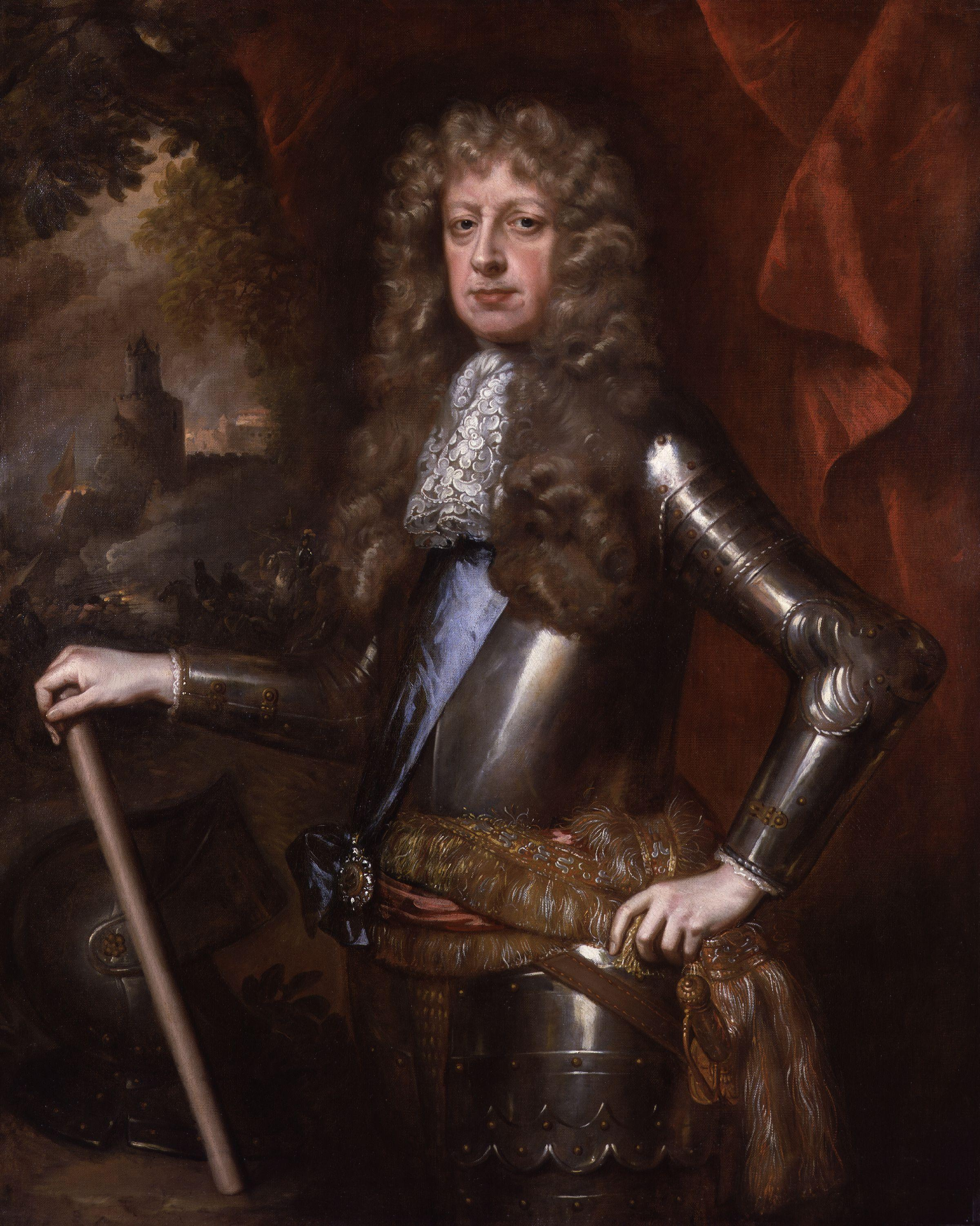
Marquess of Ormond

In November 1643 the Supreme Council appointed seven delegates, with Muskerry as leader, to submit grievances to the King and negotiate a peace treaty. In January 1644 they obtained safe-conducts from the Lords Justices. It must have been their last days in office as Ormond was sworn in as lord lieutenant of Ireland on 21 January. The delegates arrived on 24 March at Oxford where the King held his court. Muskerry demanded public exercise of the Catholic religion, independence from the English parliament, and full amnesty for their rebellion. The King offered Muskerry an earldom, which he refused. A competing Irish Protestant delegation arrived on 17 April. End of June the Confederate delegates returned to Ireland empty-handed.

The Cessation allowed the Confederates to focus on their war with the Covenanters in Ulster, who were aligned with the English Parliament. Owen Roe O'Neill led the Confederate Ulster army, deployed on that front, but the Supreme Council imposed Castlehaven as general-in-chief for the campaign of 1644. Castlehaven marched north to Charlemont but did not bring the Covenanters to battle. In July Inchiquin declared for Parliament, reactivating the southern front around the city of Cork, where the Munster Army was deployed. The fourth general assembly, in July 1644, elected the fourth Supreme Council. Muskerry regained his seat, but Fermoy did not. The cessation had a duration of one year, expiring on 15 September 1644. It was extended twice: by Muskerry and Ormond in August 1644 until 1 December; and by Muskerry and Lord Chancellor Bolton in September until 31 January 1645.

In the campaign of 1645, Castlehaven commanded the Munster Army in its fight against Inchiquin. Under Castlehaven's command Patrick Purcell took Lismore Castle, but Inchiquin doggedly defended the rest. In the fifth general assembly in summer 1645, Muskerry was re-elected to the Supreme Council.

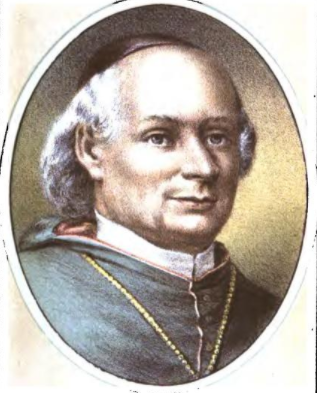
Giovanni Battista Rinuccini

==== Glamorgan Treaty ====
In 1645 the King sent Edward Somerset, Earl of Glamorgan, to Ireland to speed up the peace negotiations with the Confederates. Glamorgan was an English Catholic and son of Henry Somerset, 1st Marquess of Worcester, an important royalist. Ormond sent Glamorgan to Kilkenny with a letter of introduction to Muskerry dated 11 August. He was received by Mountgarret and Muskerry. On 25 August Glamorgan signed the first Glamorgan Treaty with the Confederates. Muskerry was one of the signatories. The treaty was kept secret. It ceded to the Catholics the churches that the Confederates had seized since the beginning of the rebellion. Sir Charles Coote divulged it in October after he found a copy in the luggage of Malachy Queally, bishop of Tuam, killed in action near Sligo. The King disavowed the treaty in January 1646.

==== Nuncio ====
In 1645 the pope sent Giovanni Battista Rinuccini as nuncio to the Irish Catholic Confederation. Rinuccini landed in October on Ireland's south-west coast with money and weapons. On his way to Kilkenny, the Confederate capital, Rinuccini visited Macroom Castle where Lady Muskerry and her 11-year-old eldest son, Charles, received him while her husband was negotiating with Ormond in Dublin. The nuncio stayed for four days and then continued to Kilkenny arriving on 12 November.

In town, the nuncio was attended to by Muskerry, who had just returned from Dublin, and by General Preston. They accompanied him to Kilkenny Castle for his official reception by Mountgarret and escorted him back to his residence.

==== First Ormond Peace ====
The Confederate assembly on 6 March 1646 authorised its delegates to conclude a peace with Ormond. Muskerry signed the "First Ormond Peace" on 28 March 1646 for the Confederates. The treaty's 30 articles covered civil rights, but left the religious ones to be decided by a future Irish parliament. The parties agreed to defer the treaty's publication for now. According to the treaty, the Confederates were expected to send an Irish army of 10,000 men, about half the Confederate army, to England before 1 May, but by then it was already too late. Bristol had fallen in September 1645 and Chester in February 1646, depriving the King of his main harbours on the Irish sea. Admiral Richard Swanley and Captain William Penn patrolled the sea with the Irish Squadron of the Parliamentarian Navy. Muskerry wrote to Ormond on 3 April that the Irish army's expedition to England had to be abandoned. The First English Civil War ended shortly after the First Ormond Peace was signed. The Scots took the King into custody on 5 May.

==== Siege of Bunratty ====
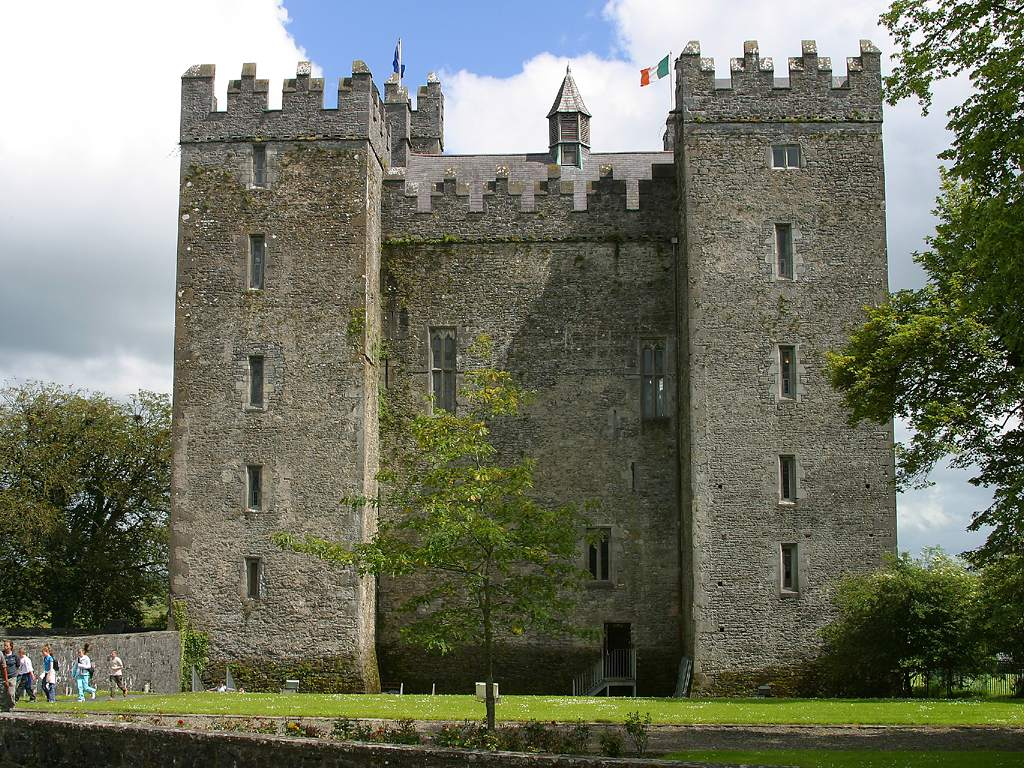
Bunratty Castle, captured by Muskerry in 1646

As the Confederates sent no troops to the King, their armies kept their full strength. The Munster Army, under Glamorgan, favoured by Rinuccini, was sent to besiege Bunratty Castle near Limerick, into which the 6th Earl of Thomond, a Protestant, had admitted a Parliamentarian garrison in March 1646. The Confederates lacked money to pay their army. After a setback on 1 April, in which the garrison drove the besiegers from their camp at Sixmilebridge, the Supreme Council replaced Glamorgan with Muskerry at the end of May. Muskerry had Lieutenant-General Purcell, Major-General Stephenson, and Colonel Purcell under him with three Leinster regiments and all the Munster forces. The castle's defences had been modernised by surrounding the castle proper, essentially a big tower house, with modern earthworks and forts defended by cannons. These fortifications abutted on the sea and Bunratty was supported by a small squadron of the Parliamentarian Navy under now-Vice-Admiral Penn. On 9 May, Lord Thomond left Bunratty for England by sea. On 13 June arrived the news of Owen Roe O'Neill's victory over the Covenanters at Benburb, won with the financial support from the nuncio. At the end of June Rinuccini came and paid the soldiers £600 (equivalent of about £115,000 in 2025), exhausting the last of his funds. Muskerry brought two heavy cannons from Limerick for the siege. His rivals accused him of having spared the castle because Thomond was his uncle. When on 1 July a chance shot through a window killed McAdam, the Parliamentarian commander, Muskerry pressed on and the castle capitulated on 14 July. The garrison was evacuated to Cork by the Parliamentarian Navy, but had to leave arms, ammunition, and provisions behind.

Early in 1646, while Muskerry was at the siege of Bunratty, Broghill with a Parliamentarian force from Cork captured Blarney Castle. It must have been a bold coup as Muskerry was accused of having betrayed the castle.

In May, Lady Muskerry, with her children was brought to Dublin for their security. Similar rescues were organised for her mother, Lady Thurles, and her sisters, Lady Hamilton and Lady Loughmoe.

==== Rejection of the First Ormond Peace ====
Muskerry and Ormond confirmed and signed the First Ormond Peace again in July 1646. The peace was thus concluded twice: on 28 March and in July 1646. Muskerry got the treaty ratified by a vote in the Supreme Council despite the nuncio's opposition. Ormond had it proclaimed in Dublin on 30 July and the Supreme Council did so in Kilkenny on 3 August.

Rinuccini held a meeting of the clergy at Waterford, which on 12 August 1646 condemned the treaty. Rinuccini then excommunicated Muskerry and others who supported it. On 18 September, Rinuccini overturned the Confederate government in a coup d'état with help of the Ulster Army, which Owen Roe O'Neill had marched to Leinster. On 26 September Rinuccini made himself president and appointed a new, the seventh, Supreme Council in which sat Glamorgan, Fermoy, and Owen Roe O'Neill. Rinuccini arrested Muskerry, Richard Bellings, and other Ormondist members of the previous Supreme Council. Most were detained in Kilkenny Castle, but Muskerry was put under house arrest. Muskerry had to cede the command of the Munster Army to Glamorgan. Being under arrest in Kilkenny Muskerry missed out on the attempted siege of Dublin by Owen Roe O'Neill and Preston in November 1646.

Having failed to take Dublin, Rinuccini released Muskerry and other political prisoners as demanded by Nicholas Plunkett, and called a general assembly, which met on 10 January 1647 in Kilkenny. It lasted until the beginning of April. The assembly elected a new Supreme Council, the eighth, with the Marquess of Antrim as president. It was dominated by the clerical faction but also included Muskerry and three other Ormondists.

==== Mutiny of the Munster Army ====
The Supreme Council had in 1647 confirmed Glamorgan, who had become the 2nd Marquess of Worcester in December 1646, as general of the Munster Army, but the Confederation lacked the funds to pay the army. Worcester was unpopular with the troops and the Munster gentry because he was English. Several regiments mutinied demanding that Muskerry should be appointed general. Three Dominican chaplains of the army insinuated that killing Muskerry would not be a sin. One of them was Patrick Hackett, a Gaelic poet. Gaelic was still the predominant language among the rank and file.

Early in June 1647 the Supreme Council met at Clonmel near the Munster Army's camp. On 12 June Muskerry, together with Patrick Purcell, rode over from the council meeting to the army's camp where the troops acclaimed him as their leader and turned Worcester out of his command. The Supreme Council ignored Muskerry's de facto take-over, upheld Worcester as the de jure commander who then passed the command officially to Muskerry. Early in August Muskerry handed the command over to Theobald Viscount Taaffe of Corren. Neither Worcester, nor Muskerry, nor Taaffe stopped Inchiquin, who took Cappoquin and Dungarvan in May and sacked Cashel in September.

==== Decline of the Confederation ====
Meanwhile, on 6 June 1647, Ormond had accepted Colonel Michael Jones with 2,000 Parliamentarian troops into Dublin. On 28 July, Ormond handed Dublin over to the Parliamentarians and left for England. In August Preston tried to march on Dublin with the Leinster army, but Jones defeated him at Dungan's Hill. Muskerry called in Owen Roe O'Neill to defend Leinster. In November, Taaffe lost the Battle of Knocknanuss against Inchiquin.

Towards the end of 1647, the Supreme Council sent Muskerry, Geoffrey Browne, and the Marquess of Antrim to negotiate with the exiled Queen Henrietta Maria, at the Château-Neuf de Saint-Germain-en-Laye, France. They wanted to invite the Prince of Wales, the future Charles II, then aged 17, to Ireland, and negotiate another peace to replace the one concluded with Ormond. In February 1648 Ormond left England and joined the Queen. Antrim departed before Muskerry and Browne and arrived early in March. Muskerry and Browne departed in February and had reached Saint-Germain by 23 March. On 24 March 1648, the Queen received the three envoys in an audience. However, 1648 was the year of the Second English Civil War and plans were made for the Prince of Wales to go to Scotland to support the Engagers rather than to go to Ireland, but eventually, he stayed in France. With regard to a new peace, Antrim, representing the clerical faction, insisted that no peace should be accepted in Ireland without the pope's approval and that a Catholic lord lieutenant should be appointed, an office he hoped to obtain for himself.

On 3 April 1648, Inchiquin changed sides, leaving the Parliamentarians and declaring for the king. Muskerry convinced the Queen to appoint Ormond as lord lieutenant and accept Inchiquin as an ally. Muskerry returned to Ireland in June to prepare for Ormond's arrival. Ormond landed at Cork in September. Muskerry was made Irish lord high admiral and president of the high Court of Admiralty. In November he signed letters of marque for the privateers Mary of Antrim and the St John of Waterford.

In January 1649, the Second Ormond Peace was signed. The Irish Catholic Confederation was dissolved, and replaced with a provisional royalist government. Power was handed to 12 Commissioners of Trust. Muskerry was one of them.

=== Cromwellian conquest ===
On 15 August 1649, Oliver Cromwell landed in Dublin. He wanted to avenge the uprising of 1641, confiscate enough Irish Catholic-owned land to pay off the English Parliament's debts, and eliminate a dangerous outpost of royalism.

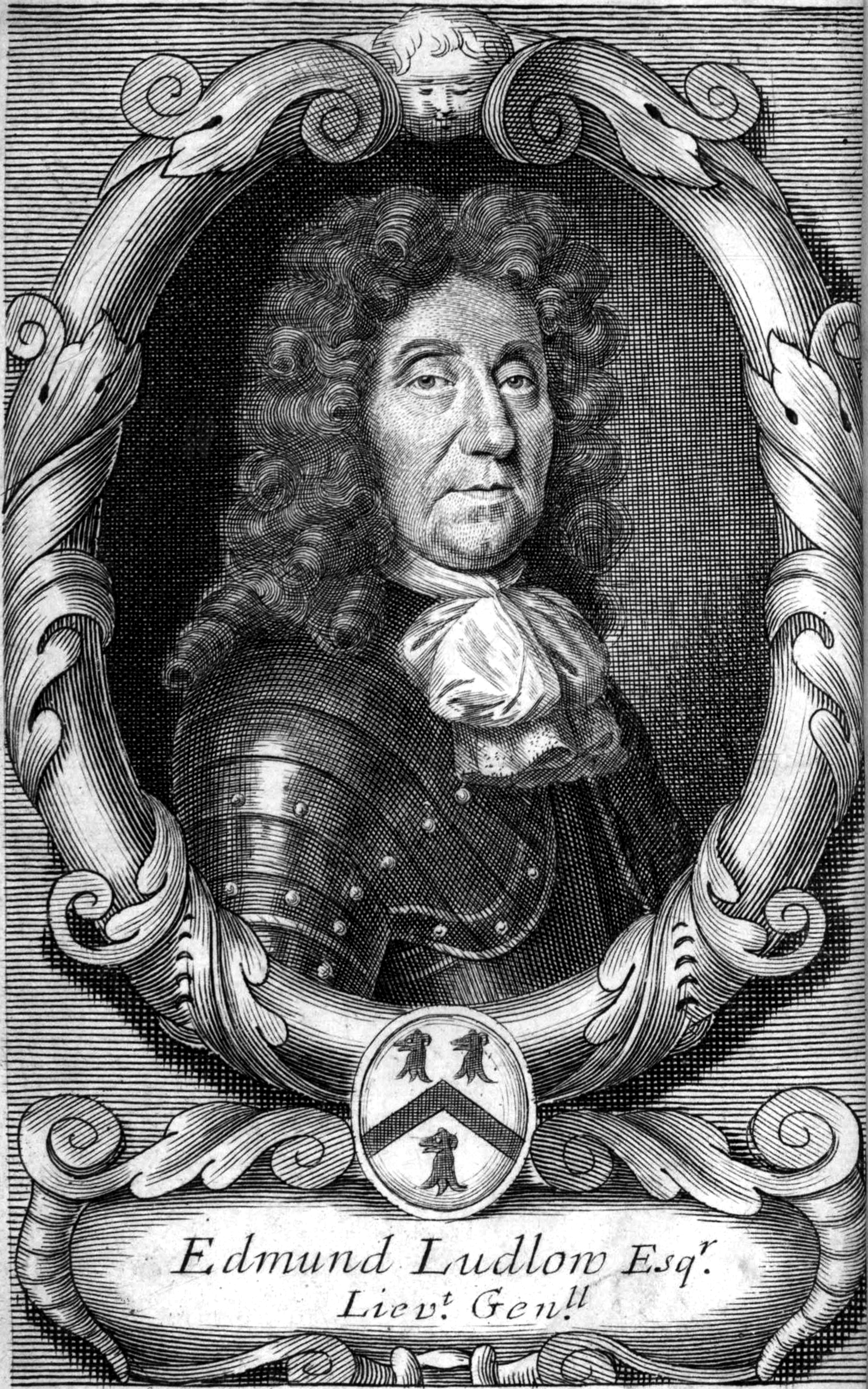
General Edmund Ludlow

In April 1650, Muskerry lost Macroom Castle. An Irish force raised by Fermoy and Boetius MacEgan, Catholic Bishop of Ross, tried to relieve the Siege of Clonmel. Led by Colonel David Roche and the bishop, this force passed by Macroom and camped in the castle's park. Macroom's garrison burned the castle and joined Roche's force, Cromwell sent Broghill to intercept the Irish, which were routed in the Battle of Macroom on 10 April. Clonmel surrendered to Cromwell in May. (Note: The date of the surrender varies with authors and is either 10 or 18 May 1650.) Cromwell had to hurry away to counter a threat from Scotland and passed the Irish command to Henry Ireton on 19 May.

In April 1651 Ulick Burke, 1st Marquess of Clanricarde, appointed Muskerry supreme commander in Munster. Muskerry tried to relieve the Siege of Limerick, but Broghill intercepted and defeated him on 26 July 1651 at the Battle of Knocknaclashy (also called Knockbrack), near Dromagh Castle, west of Kanturk, the war's last pitched battle. Limerick surrendered in October.

Muskerry fell back into the mountains of Kerry and based himself at Ross Castle near Killarney, owned by Sir Valentine Browne, his nephew by his sister Mary. Browne, born in 1638, was a minor and had become Muskerry's ward after his father's untimely death. In 1652 the government put a bounty of £500 (about £90,000 in 2025) on Muskerry's head. Muskerry hoped that the Duke of Lorraine would intervene to save the Irish royalists.

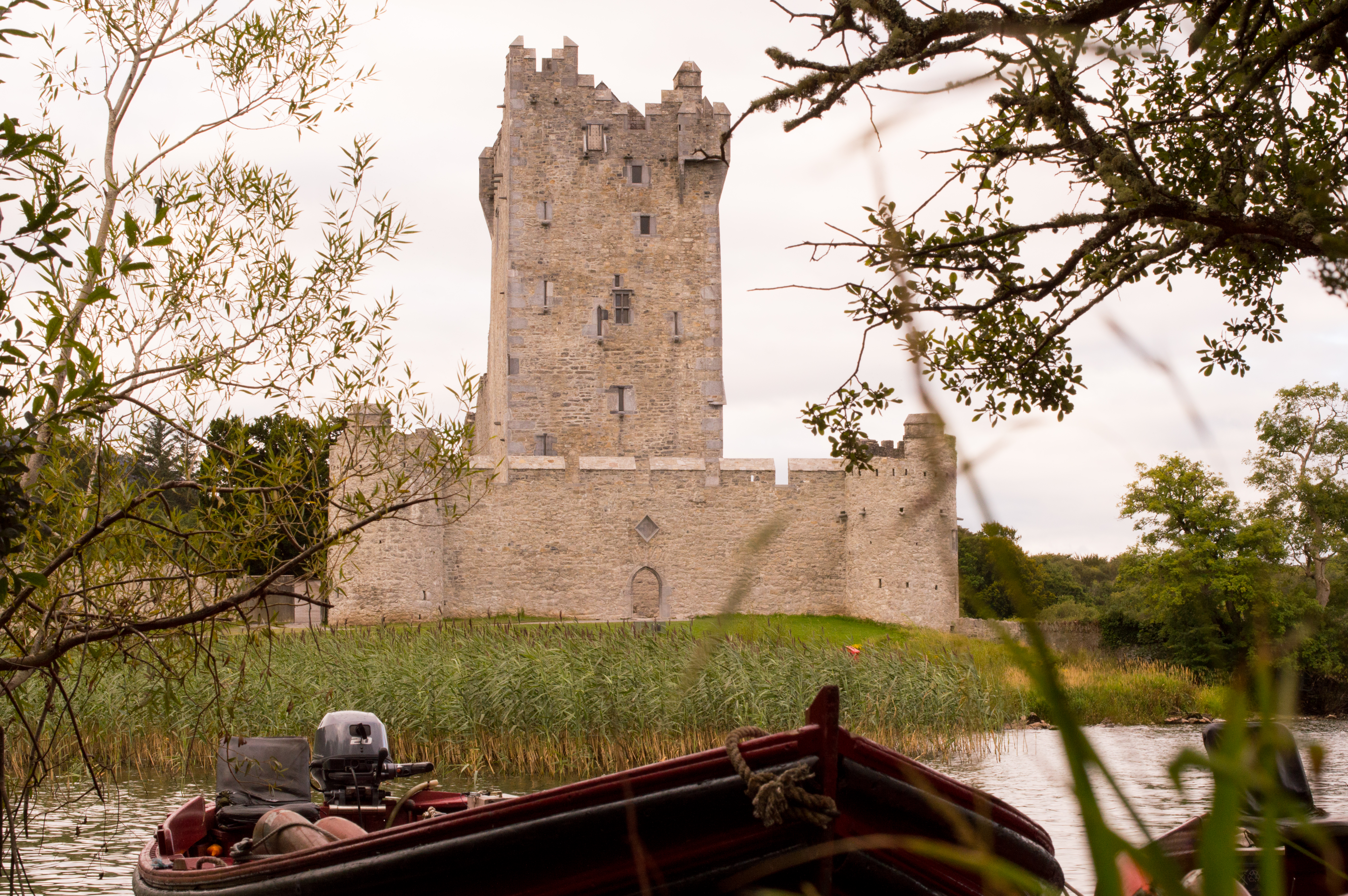
Ross Castle, Muskerry's last stand

Edmund Ludlow besieged Muskerry in Ross Castle, on the shore of Lough Leane. The defenders were supplied by boat over the lake. Ludlow brought boats of his own whereupon Muskerry surrendered on 27 June 1652 after a siege of three weeks. The terms took a possible prosecution into account. Muskerry gave two hostages to guarantee his compliance with the terms: one of his sons and "Daniel O'Brien".Daniel O'Brien. This son probably was Callaghan, whereas the Daniel O'Brien probably was the future 3rd Viscount Clare, about 30 at the time, rather than the future 1st Viscount, who was about 70. Muskerry disbanded his 5,000-strong army. He was excluded from pardon of life and estate in the Commonwealth's Act of Settlement on 12 August and therefore lost his estates. His surrender was one of the last, but Clanricarde, 28 June, and Philip O'Reilly, 27 April 1653, surrendered later.

== Exile and prosecution ==
Muskerry was allowed to embark for Spain where he was rejected as Ormondist. He then sought employment with the Venetian Republic for himself and the Irish soldiers that he brought with him, but the project fell through. He returned to Ireland late in 1653 landing at Cork to recruit soldiers for service on the continent but was arrested for war crimes and detained until the opening of his trial on 1 December in Dublin. He was accused of having been an accessory to murders of English settlers on three occasions.

The first case was the murder of William Deane and others at Kilfinny, County Limerick, by soldiers of the Munster army on 29 July 1642. The victims died when Lady Dowdall surrendered Kilfinny Castle to Patrick Purcell, who commanded the besiegers. It had been agreed that the English would be allowed to leave escorted by a detachment sent by Inchiquin. (Note: Lady Dowdall's narration is found in the 2nd volume of Gilbert's History (1882), which can be read in the original or, more easily, in a version with modernised spelling.) The second case was the murder of Mrs Hussey and others near Blarney Castle, County Cork, by Irish soldiers on 1 August 1642. The victims were refugees that Muskerry had sheltered at Macroom and was sending to Cork in a guarded convoy so that they could leave the country. The third case was the murder of Roger Skinner and others at Inniskerry, County Cork, in August 1642. Muskerry was acquitted of these three charges.

In February 1654 he was tried for having participated in royalist conspiracies. Lady Ormond, who had been allowed to return to Ireland from her French exile, secretly visited Gerard Lowther, president of the High Court of Justice at the time, who gave her legal advice for Muskerry. This helped him convince the court of his innocence and he was acquitted.

In May 1654 he had to defend himself against another murder charge concerning the killing of an unnamed man and woman. He was acquitted.

Muskerry was again allowed to embark for Spain but went to France. Henrietta Maria, now the Queen Mother, still lived there, but in July 1654 Charles II and his exile court were about to leave France and start their wanderings in the Netherlands and Germany. Lady Muskerry lived in Paris. Muskerry's daughter Helen found shelter at the abbey of Port-Royal-des-Champs near Versailles. The abbess, La Mère Angélique, tried to help Muskerry and his Irish soldiers in their need. In November 1654 she wrote to Queen Marie Louise Gonzaga of Poland proposing to employ Muskerry and his followers – 5,000 men – in Polish service. In 1655 Muskerry and Bellings led them to the Polish King, who fought the Swedes in the Second Northern War. Muskerry and Bellings returned with £20,000 for Charles II. In 1657 the King sent Muskerry to Madrid to ask the Spanish to let the Irish exiles now in Spain invade Ireland. They stayed seven months but achieved nothing. Muskerry's eldest son fought the French and Cromwell's English at the Battle of the Dunes in June 1658 The King, in exile at Brussels, rewarded Muskerry in November 1658 with the title of Earl of Clancarty. His title of Viscount Muskerry, now subsidiary, passed to his eldest son Charles, his heir apparent, as courtesy title.

== Restoration and death ==
At the Restoration of the Stuarts, Clancarty, as he now was, returned to Ireland. He used Ormond's influence to recover his estates, which Charles II confirmed to him in his "Gracious Declaration" of 30 November 1660. The Cromwellian occupiers had to leave at once. Now-Admiral William Penn, to whom Macroom had been granted in 1654, was compensated with land at Shanagarry (east of Cork). Broghill had to return Blarney and Kilcrea. The Clancartys repaired and enlarged Macroom Castle. Clancarty also recovered his townhouse, which now became Clancarty House. Clancarty found wealthy Irish spouses for his eldest son and his two daughters. This son married Margaret Bourke in 1660 or 1661. She was a rich heiress, the only child of Ulick Burke, 1st Marquess of Clanricarde. Clancarty's elder daughter Helen married twice. First, after 1660 Sir John FitzGerald of Dromana, a Protestant, as his second wife. The marriage was childless. After his death in 1664, Helen married secondly William Burke, 7th Earl of Clanricarde. Clancarty's younger daughter Margaret married Luke Plunket, 3rd Earl of Fingall, before 1666.

In the winter of 1661–1662, Clancarty signed the Catholic Remonstrance drawn up by Bellings and promoted by Peter Walsh. in an attempt to improve the Catholics' condition in Ireland by demonstrating their loyalty to the King. However, the remonstrance proved inefficient, mainly because too few of the clergy signed.

In August 1660, Charles II made George Monck, 1st Duke of Albemarle, lord lieutenant of Ireland. As Albemarle never went to Ireland, the King appointed three lords justices to govern in his stead. When the King summoned the Parliament of 1661–1666, it was opened by the lords justices on 8 May 1661. Clancarty joined the House of Lords on 20 May. On 11 June Clancarty became the proxy of Lord Inchiquin, therefore voting in his stead. The passing of the Act of Settlement was one of the main purposes of the parliament. Clancarty was absent on 30 May 1662 when the Lords finally passed it. Clancarty sat on the committee that organised the gift of £30,000 (about £4,700,000 in 2025) made to the Duke of Ormond. However, Clancarty's eldest son, Charles MacCarty, replaced him in that function on 19 August. On 11 December, the Lords passed the Irish version of the Tenures Abolition Act 1660. Clancarty attended parliament regularly until April 1663 when he moved to London. He visited his Irish estates in 1664 for a last time and returned to England.

On 3 June 1665, Charles, Viscount Muskerry, Clancarty's eldest son and heir apparent, was killed during the Second Anglo-Dutch War in the Battle of Lowestoft, a naval engagement with the Dutch and buried in Westminster Abbey as his grandfather, the 1st Viscount, had been. Charles left an infant son, called Charles James, who became the new heir apparent.

Only one and a half months later, on 4 or 5 August 1665, Clancarty died at Ormond's house at Moor Park, Hertfordshire. Ormond, despite being a Protestant, called in a Catholic priest for the last rites of his friend. The Catholic political pamphlet The Unkinde Deserter of Loyall Men and True Frinds claims that in his last hour Clancarty expressed regret at having trusted Ormond.

Charles's infant son Charles James succeeded his grandfather as the 2nd Earl of Clancarty but died a year later. The succession then reverted to the 1st Earl's second son, Callaghan, who succeeded as the 3rd Earl of Clancarty.

== Arms ==
Coat of arms of Donough MacCarty, 1st Earl of Clancarty
Coronet A coronet of an Earl Crest A dexter arm in armour proper cuffed argent erect and couped at the wrist, holding in the hand a lizard both also proper. Escutcheon Argent a stag trippant gules attired and unguled or. Supporters Two angels proper vested argent habited gules winged or, each holding in the exterior hand a shield, thereon a human head affrontée erased. Motto Forti et fideli nihil difficile.

== Notes and references ==
=== Sources ===
Subject matter monographs:

- Click here. McGrath 1997a in A Biographical Dictionary of the Membership of the Irish House of Commons 1640 to 1641
- Click here. Ohlmeyer 2004 in Oxford Dictionary of National Biography
- Click here. Ó Siochrú in Dictionary of Irish Biography
- Click here. Seccombe 1893 in Dictionary of National Biography—This is about the 4th earl but the 1st earl is treated as a co-subject
- Click here. Webb 1878 in Compendium of Irish Biography
- Adams, Constance Louisa (1904). Castles of Ireland – Some Fortress Histories and Legends. London: Elliot Stock. OCLC 751487142.
- Aiazza, Giuseppe (1873). The Embassy in Ireland of Monsignor G. B. Rinuccini, Archbishop of Fermo, in the Years 1645–1649. Translated by Hutton, Annie. Dublin: Alexander Thom. OCLC 1037551732.
- Airy, Osmund (1886). "Butler, James, twelfth Earl and first Duke of Ormonde (1610–1688)". In Lee, Sidney (ed.). Dictionary of National Biography. Vol. VIII. New York: MacMillan and Co. pp. 52–60. OCLC 8544105.
- Armstrong, Robert (October 2009). McGuire, James; Quinn, James (eds.). "Barry, David Fitz-David". Dictionary of Irish Biography.
- Asch, Ronald G. (2004). "Wentworth, Thomas, first earl of Strafford (1593–1641)". In Matthew, Colin; Harrison, Brian (eds.). Oxford Dictionary of National Biography. Vol. 56. New York: Oxford University Press. pp. 142–157. ISBN 0-19-861408-X.
- Ashley, Maurice (1954). Cromwell's Generals. London: Jonathan Cape. OCLC 186584936.
- Ashley, Maurice (1977). General Monck. Totowa, New Jersey: Rowman and Littlefield. ISBN 0-87471-934-8.
- Atkinson, Charles Francis (1911). "Great Rebellion" . In Chisholm, Hugh (ed.). Encyclopædia Britannica. Vol. 12 (11th ed.). Cambridge University Press. pp. 403–421.
- Bagwell, Richard (1895). "O'Brien, Murrough, first Earl of Inchiquin (1614–1674)". In Lee, Sidney (ed.). Dictionary of National Biography. Vol. XLI. New York: MacMillan and Co. pp. 320–327. OCLC 8544105.
- Bagwell, Richard (1909a). Ireland under the Stuarts and under the Interregnum. Vol. I. London: Longmans, Green, and Co. OCLC 458582656. – 1603 to 1642
- Bagwell, Richard (1909b). Ireland under the Stuarts and under the Interregnum. Vol. II. London: Longmans, Green, and Co. OCLC 458582656. – 1642 to 1660
- Ball, Francis Elrington (1926). The Judges in Ireland 1221–1921. Vol. I (1st ed.). London: John Murray. OCLC 832154869. – 1221 to 1690
- Barnard, Toby Christopher; Fenlon, Jane (2000). The Dukes of Ormonde, 1610–1745. Woodbridge: The Boydell Press. ISBN 0-85115-761-0.
- Barnard, Toby (2004a). "Boyle, Roger, first earl of Orrery (1621–1679)". In Matthew, Henry Colin Gray.; Harrison, Brian (eds.). Oxford Dictionary of National Biography. Vol. 7. New York: Oxford University Press. pp. 109–114. ISBN 0-19-861357-1. – Known as Baron Broghill 1628 to 1660
- Barnard, Toby (2004b). "Butler, James, first duke of Ormond (1610–1688)". In Matthew, Henry Colin Gray.; Harrison, Brian (eds.). Oxford Dictionary of National Biography. Vol. 9. New York: Oxford University Press. pp. 153–163. ISBN 0-19-861359-8.
- Beckett, James Camlin (1966). The Making of Modern Ireland. New York: Alfred A. Knopf. OCLC 1036657621.
- Belloc, Hilaire (1934). Cromwell. Philadelphia: J. B. Lippincott & Co. OCLC 615038242.
- Borlase, Edmund; Hyde, Edward (1680). The History of the Execrable Irish Rebellion. London: Robert Clavel. OCLC 1069418781.
- Bourke, Angela, ed. (2002). The Field Day Anthology of Irish Writing. Vol. V. New York: New York University Press. ISBN 0-8147-9907-8. – Volume title: Irish Women's Writing and Traditions (for Lady Dowdall's narration)
- Boyce, David George (1995) [1st pub. 1982]. Nationalism in Ireland (3rd ed.). New York: Routledge. ISBN 0-415-12776-9.
- Breffny, Brian de (1977). Castles of Ireland. London: Thames and Hudson. ISBN 978-0-500-27398-2.
- Brewer, James Norris (1826). The Beauties of Ireland. Vol. II. London: Sherwood, Gilbert, & Piper. OCLC 4286306. – Leinster (continued (Carlow, Kildare, Queen’s County, King’s County, Meath, Westmeath, Longford, Louth), & Munster
- Buckley, James (1898). "The battle of Liscarroll, 1642" (PDF). Journal of the Cork Historical and Archaeological Society. 4 (38): 83–100.
- Budgell, Eustace (2003) [1st pub. 1732]. Brady, Donald (ed.). Memoirs of the Lives and Characters of the Illustrious Family of the Boyles; Particularly of the Eminently Learned Charles, Earl of Orrery. Lismore: County Waterford Council. ISBN 0-9532022-3-2.
- Burghclere, Winifred Anne Henrietta Christina Herbert Gardner, Baroness (1912). Life of James, first Duke of Ormonde, 1610–1688. London: J. Murray. OCLC 1048334435.
- Burke, Bernard (1866). A Genealogical History of the Dormant, Abeyant, Forfeited and Extinct Peerages of the British Empire (New ed.). London: Harrison. OCLC 11501348. (for MacCarty and Thomond)
- Burke, Bernard; Burke, Ashworth Peter (1915). A Genealogical and Heraldic History of the Peerage and Baronetage, the Privy Council, Knightage and Companionage (77th ed.). London: Harrison. OCLC 1155471554. – (for Ormond)
- Burke, Rev. William (1907). History of Clonmel. Clonmel: The Clonmel Library Committee. OCLC 903076885.
- Butler, William F. T. (1904). "The Barony of Carbery" (PDF). Journal of the Cork Historical and Archaeological Society. 10 (61): 1–10. – West Carbery
- Butler, William F. T. (1925). Gleanings from Irish History. London: Longmans, Green and Co. OCLC 557681240.
- Carte, Thomas (1851a) [1st pub. 1736]. The Life of James Duke of Ormond. Vol. I (New ed.). Oxford: Oxford University Press. OCLC 1086656347. – 1613 to 1641
- Carte, Thomas (1851b) [1st pub. 1736]. The Life of James Duke of Ormond. Vol. II (New ed.). Oxford: Oxford University Press. OCLC 1086656347. – 1641 to 1643
- Carte, Thomas (1851c) [1st pub. 1736]. The Life of James Duke of Ormond. Vol. III (New ed.). Oxford: Oxford University Press. OCLC 1086656347. – 1643 to 1660
- Castlehaven, James Touchet (1815) [1st pub. 1684]. Earl of Castlehaven's Review or his Memoirs of his Engagement and Carriage in the Irish Wars. Dublin: George Mullens. OCLC 906518547.
- Casway, Jerrold I. (2004). "O'Neill, Owen Roe [Eoghan Ruadh O'Neill] (c.1550–1649)". In Matthew, Colin; Harrison, Brian (eds.). Oxford Dictionary of National Biography. Vol. 41. New York: Oxford University Press. pp. 851–856. ISBN 0-19-861391-1.
- Chester, Joseph Lemuel (1876). Registers of Westminster Abbey. London: Private Edition. OCLC 1140248. – Marriages, baptisms and burials from about 1660 to 1875
- Clark, Ruth (1921). Anthony Hamilton: his Life and Works and his Family. London: John Lane. OCLC 459281163.
- Clark, Ruth (1972) [1st pub. 1932]. Strangers and Sojourners at Port Royal. New York: Octagon Books. ISBN 0-374-91664-0.
- Clavin, Terry (2004). "St. Leger, William, d. 1642". In Matthew, Colin; Harrison, Brian (eds.). Oxford Dictionary of National Biography. Vol. 48. New York: Oxford University Press. pp. 658–660. ISBN 0-19-861398-9.
- Coffey, Diarmid (1914). O'Neill and Ormond – A Chapter of Irish History. Dublin: Maunsel & Company. OCLC 906164979.
- Cokayne, George Edward (1890). Complete Peerage of England, Scotland, Ireland, Great Britain and the United Kingdom, Extant, Extinct, or Dormant. Vol. III (1st ed.). London: George Bell and Sons. OCLC 1180838776. – D to F (for Fermoy)
- Cokayne, George Edward (1893). Complete peerage of England, Scotland, Ireland, Great Britain and the United Kingdom, extant, extinct, or dormant. Vol. V (1st ed.). London: George Bell and Sons. OCLC 1180836840. – L to M (for Mountcashel & Muskerry)
- Cokayne, George Edward (1896). Complete Peerage of England, Scotland, Ireland, Great Britain and the United Kingdom, Extant, Extinct, or Dormant. Vol. VII (1st ed.). London: George Bell and Sons. OCLC 1180891114. – S to T (for Strafford and Thomond)
- Cokayne, George Edward (1900). Complete Baronetage, 1611 to 1800. Vol. I (1st ed.). Exeter: William Pollard & Co. OCLC 866278985. – 1611 to 1625 (for Browne)
- Cokayne, George Edward (1902). Complete Baronetage, 1611 to 1800. Vol. II (1st ed.). Exeter: William Pollard & Co. OCLC 866278985. – 1625 to 1649 (for the subject)
- Cokayne, George Edward (1913). Gibbs, Vicary (ed.). The complete peerage of England, Scotland, Ireland, Great Britain and the United Kingdom, extant, extinct, or dormant. Vol. III (2nd ed.). London: St Catherine Press. OCLC 228661424. – Canonteign to Cutts (for Clancarty and Fermoy)
- Cokayne, George Edward (1926). Gibbs, Vicary (ed.). The complete peerage of England, Scotland, Ireland, Great Britain and the United Kingdom, extant, extinct, or dormant. Vol. V (2nd ed.). London: St Catherine Press. OCLC 228661424. – Eardley of Spalding to Goojerat (for Fermoy and Fingall)
- Coolahan, Marie-Louise (9 May 2019). "Dowdall [née Southwell], Elizabeth". Oxford Dictionary of National Biography. doi:10.1093/odnb/9780198614128.013.112775. – ODBC on line
- Coonan, Thomas L. (1954). The Irish Catholic Confederacy and the Puritan Revolution. Dublin: Clonmore & Reynolds Ltd. OCLC 1154300579. – Moels to Nuneham
- Corish, Patrick J. (1976a). "Chapter XI: The rising of 1641 and the Catholic Confederacy, 1641–5". In Moody, Theodore William; Martin, F. X.; Byrne, Francis John (eds.). A New History of Ireland. Vol. III. Oxford: Oxford University Press. pp. 289–316. ISBN 978-0-19-820242-4. – 1641 to 1645 (Preview)
- Corish, Patrick J. (1976b). "Chapter XII: Ormond, Rinuccini, and the confederates". In Moody, Theodore William; Martin, F. X.; Byrne, Francis John (eds.). A New History of Ireland. Vol. III. Oxford: Oxford University Press. pp. 317–335. ISBN 978-0-19-820242-4. – 1645 to 1649 (Preview)
- Corish, Patrick J. (1976c). "Chapter XIII: Cromwellian Conquest". In Moody, Theodore William; Martin, F. X.; Byrne, Francis John (eds.). A New History of Ireland. Vol. III. Oxford: Oxford University Press. pp. 336–353. ISBN 978-0-19-820242-4. – 1650 to 1653 (Preview)
- Corish, Patrick J. (2004). "Queally, Malachy". In Matthew, Colin; Harrison, Brian (eds.). Oxford Dictionary of National Biography. Vol. 45. New York: Oxford University Press. pp. 667–668. ISBN 0-19-861395-4.
- Cregan, Donal F. (1973). "The Confederation of Kilkenny". In Farrell, Brian (ed.). The Irish Parliamentary Tradition. Dublin: Gill & MacMillan. pp. 102–115. ISBN 0-7171-0594-6.
- Cregan, Donal F. (1995). "The Confederate Catholics of Ireland: The Personal of the Confederation, 1642–9". Irish Historical Studies. 29 (116): 490–512. doi:10.1017/S0021121400012256. JSTOR 30006772. S2CID 159935676.
- Creighton, Anne (2004). "The Remonstrance of December 1661 and Catholic Politics in Restoration Ireland". Irish Historical Studies. 34 (133): 16–41. doi:10.1017/S0021121400004065. JSTOR 30008650. S2CID 155960043.
- Creighton, Anne (October 2009). "Plunket, Luke". Dictionary of Irish Biography.
- Cunningham, Bernadette (October 2009). "O'Brien, Donough". Dictionary of Irish Biography.
- Cusack, Mary Frances (1871). A Compendium of Irish History. Boston: Patrick Donahoe. OCLC 873009963.
- Dorney, John (10 January 2014). "The Eleven Years War 1641–52 – A Brief Overview". The Irish Story.
- Duffy, Seán (2002). The Illustrated History of Ireland. New York: Contemporary Books. ISBN 0-8092-2437-2.
- Dunlop, Robert (1906). "Chapter 18: Ireland from the Plantation of Ulster to the Cromwellian Settlement (1611–1659)". In Ward, Adolphus William; Prothero, G. W.; Leathes, Stanley (eds.). The Cambridge Modern History. Vol. IV. Cambridge: Cambridge University Press. pp. 513–538. OCLC 1156334955. – 1611 to 1659
- Dunlop, Robert; Cunningham, Bernadette (2004). "Roche, David, seventh viscount Roche of Fermoy (1573?–1635)". In Matthew, Colin; Harrison, Brian (eds.). Oxford Dictionary of National Biography. Vol. 47. New York: Oxford University Press. pp. 460–461. ISBN 0-19-861397-0.
- Firth, Charles Harding (1894) [1st pub. 1698]. The Memoirs of Edmund Ludlow Lieutenant-General of the Horse in the Army of the Commonwealth of England 1625–1672. Vol. I. Oxford: Clarendon Press. OCLC 1113948779. – 1625 to 1655
- Firth, Charles Harding (1899). "Waller, Sir Hardress (1604?–1666?)". In Lee, Sidney (ed.). Dictionary of National Biography. Vol. LIX. New York: The MacMillan Company. pp. 127–129. OCLC 8544105.
- Firth, Charles Harding (1903). "Royalist and Cromwellian Armies in Flanders (1657–1662)". Transactions of the Royal Historical Society. New Series. 17: 67–119. doi:10.2307/3678138. JSTOR 3678138. S2CID 163012566.
- Firth, Charles Harding; Rait, R. S. (1911). The Acts and Ordinances of the Interregnum. Laws, etc. Vol. II. London: His/Her Majesty's Stationery Office. OCLC 271021959.
- Foster, Robert Fitzroy (1989). The Oxford History of Ireland. Oxford: Oxford University Press. ISBN 978-0-19-280202-6.
- French, Rev. Nicholas (1846) [1st pub. 1676]. Bindon, Samuel Henry (ed.). The Historical Works of the Right Rev. Nicholas French. Vol. II. Dublin: James Duffy. OCLC 4187137. – Contains "The Unkinde Desertor of Loyall Men and True Frinds"
- Fryde, Edmund Boleslaw; Greenway, D. E.; Porter, S.; Roy, I., eds. (1986). Handbook of British Chronology. Royal Historical Society Guides and Handbooks, No. 2 (3rd ed.). London: Offices of the Royal Historical Society. ISBN 0-86193-106-8. – (for timeline)
- Gardiner, Samuel Rawson (1886). History of the Great Civil War 1642–1649. Vol. I. London: Longmans, Green & Co. OCLC 874431332. – 1642 to 1644
- Gardiner, Samuel Rawson (1887). "Charles and the Earl of Glamorgan". The English Historical Review. 2 (8): 687–708. JSTOR 546913.
- Gardiner, Samuel Rawson (1893a). History of the Great Civil War 1642–1649. Vol. III (New ed.). London: Longmans, Green & Co. OCLC 174542284. – 1645 to 1647
- Gardiner, Samuel Rawson (1893b). History of the Great Civil War 1642–1649. Vol. IV (New ed.). London: Longmans, Green & Co. OCLC 174542285. – 1647 to 1649 & Index
- Gerard, John (1913). "Chronology, General". In Herbermann, Charles George (ed.). Catholic Encyclopedia. Vol. III. New York: The Encyclopedia Press. pp. 738–742. OCLC 1157968788.
- Gibson, Charles Bernard (1861a). The History of the County and City of Cork. Vol. I. London: Thomas C. Newby. OCLC 1046580159. – to 1603
- Gibson, Charles Bernard (1861b). The History of the County and City of Cork. Vol. II. London: Thomas C. Newby. OCLC 1046522071. – 1603 to 1860
- Gibson, A. J. S.; Smout, Thomas Christopher (1995). Prices, Food and Wages in Scotland, 1550–1780. Cambridge: Cambridge University Press. ISBN 0-521-34656-8.
- Gilbert, John Thomas, ed. (1879). A Contemporary History of Affairs in Ireland from 1641 to 1652. Vol. I. Dublin: Irish Archeological and Celtic Society. OCLC 831383411. – Aphorismical Discovery, 1641 to 1648
- Gilbert, John Thomas, ed. (1882a). History of the Irish Confederation and the War in Ireland 1641–1643. Historic literature of Ireland. Vol. I (limited to two hundred copies ed.). Dublin: Printed for the editor by M. H. Gill & Son. OCLC 220683699. – History based on Richard Bellings’s memoirs
- Gilbert, John Thomas, ed. (1882b). History of the Irish Confederation and the War in Ireland 1641–1643. Historic literature of Ireland. Vol. II (limited to two hundred copies ed.). Dublin: Printed for the editor by M. H. Gill & Son. OCLC 220683699. – Letters, acts, and Lady Dowdall's narration
- Gillespie, Raymond (2006). Seventeenth-Century Ireland: Making Ireland Modern. Dublin: Gill & MacMillan. ISBN 978-0-7171-3946-0.
- Gillman, Herbert Webb (1892). "Historical Pedigree 1380 to 1641 A.D., of MacCarthys, Lord of Muskerry, Co. Cork" (PDF). Journal of the Cork Historical and Archaeological Society. 1 (10). fold-out.
- Godwin, William (1827). History of the Commonwealth of England. Vol. The Third. London: Henry Colburn. OCLC 310477851. – 1649 to 1653
- Hagan, J. (1912). "Walsh, Peter". In Herbermann, Charles George (ed.). Catholic Encyclopedia. Vol. XV. New York: The Encyclopedia Press. p. 541. OCLC 1157968788.
- Hanks, Patrick; Hodges, Flavia (1990). A Dictionary of First Names. Oxford: Oxford University Press. ISBN 0-19-860764-4. – (for Donough)
- Hamlyn, Kate (2007). "Blarney Castle: Myth and Reality". Irish Arts Review. 24 (4): 126–129. JSTOR 25503636.
- Harris, Tim (2014). Rebellion, Britains's First Stuart Kings 1567–1642. Oxford: Oxford University Press. ISBN 978-0-19-920900-2. – (Preview)
- Harris, William Torrey (1930). Webster's New International Dictionary of the English Language. Springfield, Massachusetts: G. & C. Merriam Company. OCLC 1158283506.
- Hayes-McCoy, Gerard Anthony (1990) [1st pub. 1969]. Irish Battles: A Military History of Ireland. Belfast: The Appletree Press. ISBN 0-86281-250-X.
- Hey, David (1996). The Oxford Companion to Family and Local History. Oxford: Oxford University Press. ISBN 0-19-211688-6.
- Hickson, Mary Agnes (1884a). Ireland in the Seventeenth Century: Or the Massacres of 1641–2. Vol. I. London: Longmans, Green, and Co. OCLC 1047479300. – Preface, Introduction, Depositions
- Hickson, Mary Agnes (1884b). Ireland in the Seventeenth Century: Or the Massacres of 1641–2. Vol. II. London: Longmans, Green, and Co. OCLC 1047479046. – Depositions (continued), Records of the High Court of Justice, and Appendix
- Hill, Rev. George (1873). An Historical Account of the MacDonnells of Antrim. Belfast: Archer & Sons. OCLC 1046037789.
- House of Commons (1878). Return. Members of Parliament – Part II. Parliaments of Great Britain, 1705–1796. Parliaments of the United Kingdom, 1801–1874. Parliaments and Conventions of the Estates of Scotland, 1357–1707. Parliaments of Ireland, 1599–1800. London: His/Her Majesty's Stationery Office. OCLC 13112546.
- House of Lords (1779). Journals of the House of Lords (PDF). Vol. I. Dublin: William Sleater. OCLC 35009219. – 1634 to 1699
- Hunter-Blair, D. O. (1913). "Oxford, University of". In Herbermann, Charles George (ed.). Catholic Encyclopedia. Vol. XI. New York: The Encyclopedia Press. p. 365. OCLC 1157968788.
- Hyde, Edward (1827). The Life of Edward Earl of Clarendon. Vol. II (A new ed.). Oxford: The Clarendon Printing House. OCLC 1283560. – 1661 to 1665
- J. C. (1908). "Admiral Penn, William Penn, and their descendants in the County Cork" (PDF). Journal of the Cork Historical and Archaeological Society. 14 (79): 105–114.
- Joyce, Patrick Weston (1903). A Concise History of Ireland from the Earliest Times to 1837 (12th ed.). Dublin: M. H. Gill & Son. OCLC 815623752.
- Kearney, Hugh Francis (1959). Strafford in Ireland 1633–1641 – a Study in Absolutism. Manchester: Manchester University Press. OCLC 857142293.
- Kelsey, Sean (2004). "Butler, Richard, third viscount Mountgarret (1578–1651)". In Matthew, Henry Colin Gray; Harrison, Brian (eds.). Oxford Dictionary of National Biography. Vol. 9. New York: Oxford University Press. pp. 196–197. ISBN 0-19-861359-8.
- Lainé, P. Louis (1836). "Mac-Carthy". Archives généalogiques et historiques de la noblesse de France [Genealogical and Historical Archives of the Nobility of France] (in French). Vol. Tome cinquième. Paris: Imprimerie de Bethune et Plon. pp. 1–102. OCLC 865941166.
- Lenihan, Padraig (1997). "War and Population 1649–52". Irish Economic and Social History. 24: 1–21. doi:10.1177/033248939702400101. JSTOR 24340829. S2CID 165107823.
- Lenihan, Pádraig (2004). "Barry, Gerat (d. 1646)". In Matthew, Henry Colin Gray; Harrison, Brian (eds.). Oxford Dictionary of National Biography. Vol. 4. New York: Oxford University Press. pp. 130–131. ISBN 0-19-861354-7.
- Lenihan, Pádraig (2008). Consolidating Conquest: Ireland 1603–1727. London: Routledge. ISBN 978-0-582-77217-5. – (Preview)
- Little, Patrick (2004a). "O'Brien, Murrough, first earl of Inchiquin (1614–1674)". In Matthew, Colin; Harrison, Brian (eds.). Oxford Dictionary of National Biography. Vol. 41. New York: Oxford University Press. pp. 373–380. ISBN 0-19-861391-1.
- Little, Patrick (2004b). "Perceval, Sir Philip". In Matthew, Colin; Harrison, Brian (eds.). Oxford Dictionary of National Biography. Vol. 43. New York: Oxford University Press. pp. 661–637. ISBN 0-19-861393-8.
- Little, Patrick (2004c). "Waller, Sir Hardress (c.1604–1666)". In Matthew, Colin; Harrison, Brian (eds.). Oxford Dictionary of National Biography. Vol. 56. New York: Oxford University Press. pp. 977–979. ISBN 0-19-861406-3.
- Lodge, John (1789a). Archdall, Mervyn (ed.). The Peerage of Ireland or, A Genealogical History of the Present Nobility of that Kingdom. Vol. II. Dublin: James Moore. OCLC 264906028. – Earls
- Lodge, John (1789b). Archdall, Mervyn (ed.). The Peerage of Ireland or, A Genealogical History of the Present Nobility of that Kingdom. Vol. IV. Dublin: James Moore. OCLC 264906028. – Viscounts
- Lodge, John (1789c). Archdall, Mervyn (ed.). The Peerage of Ireland or, A Genealogical History of the Present Nobility of that Kingdom. Vol. VI. Dublin: James Moore. OCLC 264906028. – Viscounts, barons
- Lodge, John (1789d). Archdall, Mervyn (ed.). The Peerage of Ireland or, A Genealogical History of the Present Nobility of that Kingdom. Vol. VII. Dublin: James Moore. OCLC 264906028. – Barons (for his sister Mary)
- Mackenzie, Thérèse Muir (1907). Dromana: the Memoirs of an Irish Family. Dublin: Sealy, Bryers, and Walker. OCLC 1156362488.
- Macray, Rev. W. Dunn, ed. (1876). Calendar of the Clarendon State Papers. Vol. III. Oxford: Clarendon Press. OCLC 1041641193. – 1655 to 1657
- Mahaffy, John Pentland (1891). "From the Caroline Reform to the Settlement of William III". In Wright, Edward Perceval (ed.). The Book of Trinity College, Dublin 1591 1891. Belfast: Marcus Ward & Co.
- Mangianiello, Stephen C. (2004). The Concise Encyclopedia of the Revolutions and Wars of England, Scotland, and Ireland 1639–1660. Lanham MD: Scarecrow Press. ISBN 0-8108-5100-8.
- Manning, Conleth (2001). "The Two Sir George Hamiltons and their Connections with the Castles of Roscrea and Nenagh" (PDF). Tipperary Historical Journal: 149–154.
- McCarthy, Samuel Trant (1913). "The Clann Carthaigh (continued)". Kerry Archaeological Magazine. 2 (10): 53–74. doi:10.2307/30059665. JSTOR 30059665.
- McCarthy, Samuel Trant (1922). The MacCarthys of Munster. Dundalk: The Dundalgan Press. OCLC 1157128759.
- McGettigan, Darren (October 2009). "Somerset, Edward". Dictionary of Irish Biography.
- McGrath, Brid (1997a). "Donough Mc Carthy, (1594–1665) Cork County". A Biographical Dictionary of the Membership of the Irish House of Commons 1640 to 1641 (Ph.D.). Vol. 1. Dublin: Trinity College. pp. 203–204. hdl:2262/77206. – Parliaments & Biographies (PDF downloadable from given URL)
- McGrath, Brid (1997b). "Redmond Roche Cork County". A Biographical Dictionary of the Membership of the Irish House of Commons 1640 to 1641 (Ph.D.). Vol. 1. Dublin: Trinity College. pp. 257–258. hdl:2262/77206. – Parliaments & Biographies (PDF downloadable from given URL)
- McGrath, Brid (1997c). "William St. Leger (c1580–1642) Cork County". A Biographical Dictionary of the Membership of the Irish House of Commons 1640 to 1641 (Ph.D.). Vol. 1. Dublin: Trinity College. pp. 265–266. hdl:2262/77206. – Parliaments & Biographies (PDF downloadable from given URL)
- McGurk, J. J. N. (2004). "O'Brien, Donough, fourth earl of Thomond (d. 1624)". In Matthew, Colin; Harrison, Brian (eds.). Oxford Dictionary of National Biography. Vol. 41. New York: Oxford University Press. pp. 360–362. ISBN 0-19-861391-1.
- Meehan, Rev. Charles Patrick (1882). The Confederation of Kilkenny (New revised and enlarged ed.). Dublin: James Duffy. OCLC 224157081.
- M'Enery, M. J. (1904). "A Diary of the Siege of Limerick Castle, 1642". The Journal of the Royal Society of Antiquaries of Ireland. 5th. 34 (2): 163–187. JSTOR 25507363.
- Moody, Theodore William; Martin, F. X. (2001) [1st pub. 1967]. The Course of Irish History (4th ed.). Oxford: Roberts Rinehart Publishers. ISBN 1-58979-002-2.
- Moody, Theodore William; Martin, F. X.; Byrne, Francis John, eds. (1984). A New History of Ireland. Vol. IX:Maps, Genealogies, Lists. Oxford: Oxford University Press. ISBN 0-19-821745-5.
- Morgan, Hiram (2004). "Confederate War". In Connolly, Sean Joseph (ed.). The Oxford Companion to Irish History (2nd ed.). Oxford: Oxford University Press. pp. 115–116. ISBN 0-19-280501-0.
- Moriarty, G. P. (1895). "Perceval, Sir Philip (1605–1647)". In Lee, Sidney (ed.). Dictionary of National Biography. Vol. XLIV. New York: MacMillan and Co. pp. 373–375. OCLC 1043016801.
- Morrill, John, ed. (1991). The Impact of the English Civil War. London: Collins & Brown. ISBN 1-85585-042-7.
- Morrill, John (2004). "Cromwell, Oliver (1599–1658)". In Matthew, Colin; Harrison, Brian (eds.). Oxford Dictionary of National Biography. Vol. 14. New York: Oxford University Press. pp. 321–354. ISBN 0-19-861364-4.
- Morley, Vincent (2016). "The Irish Language". In Bourke, Richard; McBride, Ian (eds.). The Princeton History of Modern Ireland. Princeton: Princeton University Press. pp. 320–342. ISBN 978-0-691-15406-0.
- Mountmorres, Hervey Redmond Morres, Viscount (1792). The History of the Principal Transactions of the Irish Parliament from the Year 1634 to 1666. Vol. I. London: T. Cadell. OCLC 843863159. – House of Lords
- Murphy, Elaine (2012a). Ireland and the War at Sea 1641–1653. Rochester NY: The Boydell Press. ISBN 978-0-86193-318-1.
- Murphy, Elaine (2012b). "Two Inventories of Goods Belonging to Sir Hardress Waller in Ireland". Journal of the Royal Society of Antiquaries of Ireland. 142/143: 140–154. JSTOR 24892516.
- Murphy, John A. (1959). Justin MacCarthy, Lord Mountcashel, Commander of the First Irish brigade in France. Cork: Cork University Press. OCLC 6340176. – (Snippet view)
- Murphy, John A. (October 2009). "O'Brien, Murrough". Dictionary of Irish Biography.
- Ó hAnnracháin, Tadhg (2008). "The poet and the Mutinies: Pádraigín Haicéad and the Munster Army in 1647". Proceedings of the Royal Irish Academy. Section C: Archaeology, Celtic Studies, History, Linguistics, Literature. 108C: 65–74. doi:10.1353/ria.2008.0002. JSTOR 40657922. S2CID 245848315.
- O Callaghan, Joseph F. (1990). "The O Callaghans and the Rebellion of 1641" (PDF). Journal of the Cork Historical and Archaeological Society. 95: 30–40.
- Ó Cuív, Brian (1976). "Chapter XX: The Irish Language in the Early Modern Period". In Moody, Theodore William; Martin, F. X.; Byrne, Francis John (eds.). A New History of Ireland. Vol. III. Oxford: Oxford University Press. pp. 509–545. ISBN 978-0-19-820242-4.
- O'Donoghue, John (1860). Historical Memoir of the O'Briens. Dublin: Hodges Smith & Co. OCLC 316665132.
- O'Hart, John (1892). Irish Pedigrees: Or, the Origin and Stem of the Irish Nation. Vol. I (5th ed.). Dublin: James Duffy & Co. OCLC 7239210. – Irish stem
- Ohlmeyer, Jane H. (2001) [1st pub. 1993]. Civil War and Restoration in the Three Stuart Kingdoms: The Career of Randal MacDonnell, Marquis of Antrim (2nd ed.). Dublin: Four Courts Press. ISBN 1-85182-626-2. – (Snippet view)
- Ohlmeyer, Jane H. (2004). "MacCarthy, Donough, first earl of Clancarty (1594–1665)". In Matthew, Colin; Harrison, Brian (eds.). Oxford Dictionary of National Biography. Vol. 35. New York: Oxford University Press. pp. 107–108. ISBN 0-19-861385-7.
- Ohlmeyer, Jane H. (2012). Making Ireland English: The Irish Aristocracy in the Seventeenth Century. New Haven, Connecticut: Yale University Press. ISBN 978-0-300-11834-6. – (Preview)
- Ó Siochrú, Micheál (1997). Confederate Ireland 1642–1649: A Constitutional and Political Analysis (Ph.D.). Dublin: Trinity College. hdl:2262/77228. – (PDF downloadable from given URL)
- Ó Siochrú, Micheál (2005). "The Duke of Lorraine and the International Struggle for Ireland, 1649–1653". The Historical Journal. 48 (4): 905–932. doi:10.1017/S0018246X05004851. JSTOR 4091642. S2CID 159714186.
- Ó Siochrú, Micheál (2007). "Atrocity, Codes of Conduct, and the Irish in the British Civil Wars 1641–1653". Past & Present (195): 55–86. doi:10.1093/pastj/gtl029. JSTOR 25096669.
- Ó Siochrú, Micheál (October 2009a). McGuire, James; Quinn, James (eds.). "Bellings (Bealing), Richard". Dictionary of Irish Biography.
- Ó Siochrú, Micheál (October 2009b). McGuire, James; Quinn, James (eds.). "MacCarthy, Donough". Dictionary of Irish Biography.
- Ó Siochrú, Micheál (October 2009c). McGuire, James; Quinn, James (eds.). "O'Brien, Sir Daniel". Dictionary of Irish Biography.
- Ó Siochrú, Micheál (October 2009d). McGuire, James; Quinn, James (eds.). "Roche, David". Dictionary of Irish Biography.
- Ó Siochrú, Micheál (October 2009e). McGuire, James; Quinn, James (eds.). "Roche, Maurice". Dictionary of Irish Biography.
- Pemsel, Helmut (1977). A History of War at Sea. Translated by Smith, D. G. Annapolis: The Naval Institute Press. ISBN 0-87021-803-4.
- Perceval-Maxwell, Michael (1994). The Outbreak of the Irish Rebellion of 1641. Montreal: McGill-Queen's University Press. ISBN 0-7735-1157-1. – (Preview)
- Perceval-Maxwell, Michael (2004). "Butler [née Preston] Elizabeth, duchess of Ormond and suo jure Lady Dingwall (1615–1684)". In Matthew, Henry Colin Gray.; Harrison, Brian (eds.). Oxford Dictionary of National Biography. Vol. 9. New York: Oxford University Press. pp. 130–131. ISBN 0-19-861359-8.
- Pocock, John Greville Agard (1996). "The Atlantic Archipelago and the War of the Three Kingdoms". In Bradshaw, Brendan; Morrill, John (eds.). The British Problem c. 1534–1707: State Formation in the Atlantic Archipelago. London: MacMillan Education. pp. 172–191. doi:10.1007/978-1-349-24731-8_7. ISBN 978-0-333-59246-5.
- Pollard, Albert Frederick (1898). "Somerset, Edward (1601–1667)". In Lee, Sidney (ed.). Dictionary of National Biography. Vol. LIII. London: Smith, Elder, & Co. p. 232. OCLC 8544105.
- Prendergast, John Patrick (1854). "The Surrender of Ross Castle, Killarney,22nd June 1652". Proceedings and Transactions of the Kilkenny and South-East of Ireland Archaeological Society. 3 (1): 146–151. JSTOR 25493639.
- Prendergast, John Patrick (1868). The Cromwellian Settlement of Ireland. New York: P. M. Haverty. OCLC 700629664.
- Quinn; Nichols (1976). "Chapter I: Ireland in 1534". In Moody, Theodore William; Martin, F. X.; Byrne, Francis John (eds.). A New History of Ireland. Vol. III. Oxford: Oxford University Press. pp. 1–38. ISBN 978-0-19-820242-4. – 1534–1691
- Roberts, Stephen K. (2004). "Somerset, Edward, 2nd Marquess of Worcester (d. 1667)". In Matthew, Colin; Harrison, Brian (eds.). Oxford Dictionary of National Biography. Vol. 51. New York: Oxford University Press. pp. 577–581. ISBN 0-19-861401-2.
- Round, John Horace (1911). "Baronet" . In Chisholm, Hugh (ed.). Encyclopædia Britannica. Vol. 3 (11th ed.). Cambridge University Press. pp. 423–424.
- Sainte-Beuve, Charles-Augustin (1878). Port-Royal (in French). Vol. Tome deuxième (4th ed.). Paris: Hachette. OCLC 493070637.
- Sanford, George (2003). Historical Dictionary of Poland. Lanham, Maryland: Scarecrow Press. ISBN 978-0-8108-6594-5.
- Scott, Eva (1905). The King in Exile. The Wanderings of Charles II from June 1646 to July 1654. New York: E. P. Dutton and Company .
- Seaward, Paul (2004). "Charles II". In Matthew, Henry Colin Gray; Harrison, Brian (eds.). Oxford Dictionary of National Biography. Vol. 11. New York: Oxford University Press. pp. 122–145. ISBN 0-19-861361-X.
- Seccombe, Thomas (1893). "MacCarthy or MacCarty, Donough, fourth Earl of Clancarty". In Lee, Sidney (ed.). Dictionary of National Biography. Vol. XXXIV. London: Smith, Elder, & Co. pp. 436–438. OCLC 8544105.
- Simms, John Gerald (1986). War and Politics in Ireland 1649–1730. London: The Hambledon Press. ISBN 0-907628-72-9.
- Smith, Charles (1893) [1st pub. 1750]. The Ancient and Present State of the County and City of Cork. Vol. II. Cork: Guy and Co. OCLC 559463963. – History
- Street, Lucie (1988). An Uncommon Sailor: A Portrait of Admiral Sir William Penn. New York: St. Martin's Press. ISBN 978-0-312-01526-8.
- Sullivan, Alexander Martin (1894). The Story of Ireland (New ed.). Dublin: M. H. Gill & Son. OCLC 1085325651.
- Tomassetti, Stefano (2016). Romanelli, Raffaele (ed.). "Rinuccini, Giovanni Battista". Dizionario Biografico degli Italiani (in Italian). – Online edition
- Townshend, Dorothea (1904). "The Irish Attack on Youghal in 1642". Journal of the Cork Historical and Archaeological Society. 10 (62): 100–102.
- Vigors, Philip D. (1896). "Rebellion 1641–2 Described in a Letter from Rev. Urban Vigors to Rev. Henry Jones". Journal of the Cork Historical and Archaeological Society. 2nd. II: 289–306.
- Warner, Ferdinand (1768). History of the Rebellion and Civil-War in Ireland. Vol. II. Dublin: James William. OCLC 82770539. – 1643 to 1660 and index
- Wauchope, Piers (2004). "MacCarthy, Justin, first Viscount Mountcashel (1643–1694)". In Matthew, Colin; Harrison, Brian (eds.). Oxford Dictionary of National Biography. Vol. 35. New York: Oxford University Press. pp. 111–112. ISBN 978-0-19-861385-5.
- Webb, Alfred (1878). "MacCarty, Donough, Viscount Muskerry, Earl of Clancarty". Compendium of Irish Biography. Dublin: M. H. Gill & Son. p. 303, right column. OCLC 122693688.
- Wedgwood, Cicely Veronica (1961). Thomas Wentworth, First Earl of Strafford 1593–1641. A Revaluation. London: Jonathan Cape. OCLC 1068569885.
- Wedgwood, Cicely Veronica (1978) [1st pub. 1958]. The King's War 1641–1647. London: Collins. ISBN 0-00-211404-6.
- Wells, Jennifer (2015). "English Law, Irish Trials and Cromwellian State Building in the 1650s". Past & Present (227): 77–119. doi:10.1093/pastj/gtv021. JSTOR 24544866.
- Westropp, Thomas Johnson (1907). "The Principal Ancient Castles of the County Limerick: Part II Tudor Period". The Journal of the Royal Society of Antiquaries of Ireland. 37 (2): 153–164. JSTOR 25507604.
- Westropp, Thomas Johnson (1908). "The Monastery of St. Brigid, Kilcrea, and the Castle of the MacCarthys" (PDF). Journal of the Cork Historical and Archaeological Society. 14 (80): 157–177.
- Wiggins, Kenneth (2001). Anatomy of a Siege: King John's Castle, Limerick, 1642. London: The Boydell Press. ISBN 0-85115-827-7. – (Preview)
- Wood, Herbert (1935). "The titles of the chief governors of Ireland". Bulletin of the Institute of Historical Research. 13 (37): 1–8. doi:10.1111/j.1468-2281.1935.tb00065.x.
- Woolrych, Austin (2002). Britain in Revolution. Oxford: Oxford University Press. ISBN 0-19-820081-1.

Parliament of Ireland
Preceded by Dermod McCarthy; Andrew Barret	Member of Parliament for County Cork; 1634–1635; With: Sir William St Leger	Succeeded by Donough MacCarty; Sir William St Leger
Preceded by Donough MacCarty; Sir William St Leger	Member of Parliament for County Cork; 1640–1641; With: Sir William St Leger	Succeeded by Redmond Roche; Sir William St Leger
Peerage of Ireland
New creation	Earl of Clancarty; 1st creation 1658–1665	Succeeded by Charles James MacCarty
Preceded by Charles MacCarty	Viscount Muskerry; 1641–1665	Succeeded by Charles James MacCarty
Baronetage of Nova Scotia
New creation	Baronet (of Muskerry) c. 1638 – 1665	Succeeded by Charles James MacCarty
