= Ahane =

Ahane may refer to:

- Ahane, County Kerry, a townland in County Kerry, Ireland
- Ahane, County Limerick, a populated area in County Limerick, Ireland
  - Ahane GAA, a Gaelic Athletic Association club in County Limerick, Ireland
- Ahane (surname), a surname of Ryukyuan origin

== People with the surname ==
- Ayano Ahane (亜波根 綾乃, born 1981), Japanese singer-songwriter
