= Ahane (surname) =

Ahane or Ahagon (Kanji: 阿波根 or 亜波根) is a Ryukyuan surname. Notable people with the surname include:

- Ayano Ahane (亜波根 綾乃), Japanese singer

== Fictional characters ==
- Umiko Ahagon (阿波根うみこ), character in the anime series New Game!

== See also ==
- Okinawan name
