= Dromagh Castle =

Ruined tower house in County Cork, Ireland

- Caisleán Dhromach
- Dromagh, County Cork, Ireland
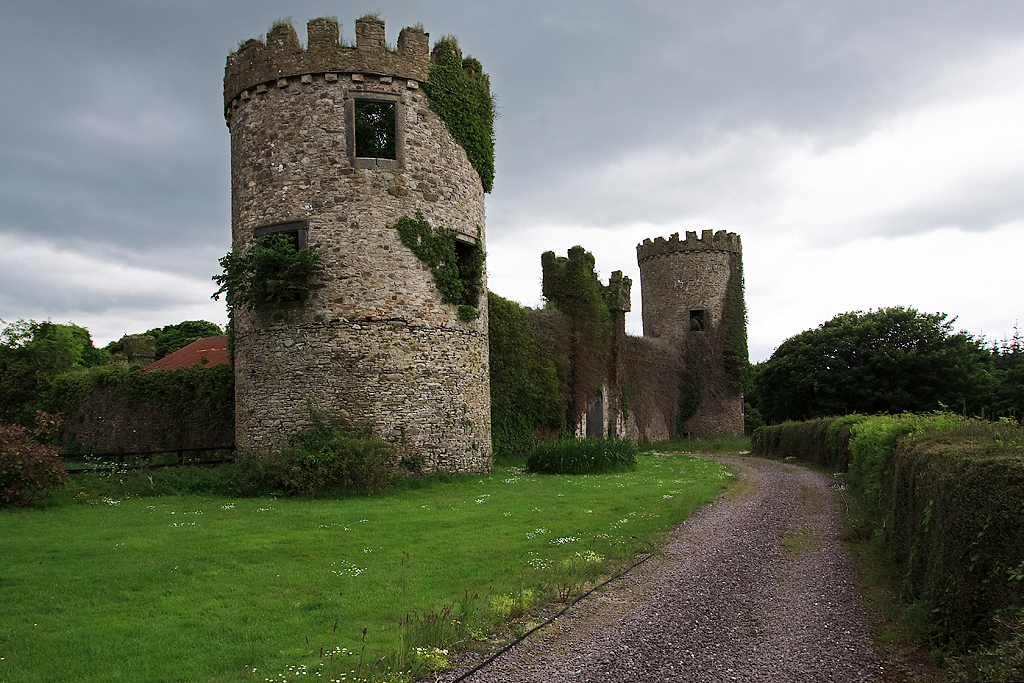
- Ruins of Dromagh Castle, 2012

Site information
- Type: Tower house
- Owner: Private
- Open to the public: No
- Condition: Ruins

Location
- Location within Ireland
- Coordinates: 52.1304°N 8.9712°W

Site history
- Built: c.1582
- Built by: Art Ó Caoimh
- Materials: Stone
- Demolished: 1921

Dromagh Castle (Irish: Caisleán Dhromach) is a ruined tower house located near the village of Dromagh, County Cork, Ireland. Built in the late 16th century by Art Ó Caoimh, it served as the principal seat of the O'Keeffe clan, one of the prominent Gaelic families of north Cork. After the Cromwellian conquest of Ireland, the property passed to the Leader family, who converted it into a country house in the 19th century. The castle was burned by the Irish Republican Army during the Irish War of Independence in 1921 and it currently sits in ruins, surrounded by farmland.

== History ==
=== Ownership ===
The O'Keeffe clan, a Gaelic Irish clan that historically belonged to Eóganacht dynasty, specifically to the Eóganacht Rathlind branch, were the original owners of the castle. According to tradition, the clan claimed both a mythological and a historical line of descent. Regarding the first, the family traced their ancestry to the Celtic goddess Clíodhna, who was considered the Queen of the Banshees. This legendary descent gave the clan a semi-divine heritage.

The O'Keefes held numerous territories around the plains of Fermoy, but were eventually forced to move westward due to the advance of the Norman families, such as the Roches, the Condons, and the FitzGeralds. They settled in the Dromagh area, where they established their principal stronghold in the region. Other castles were built at Duarigle and Drominagh, along with fortified houses at Ahane, Ballyquirk and Cullen.

The barony of Duhallow, along with the MacCarthy dynasty, comprised three clans: the O'Keeffe, the O'Callaghan and the MacAuliffe. The O'Keeffe territory enclosed the source of the Munster Blackwater, extending eastward as far as Dromagh Castle.

In the late 17th century, the castle belonged to Daniel O'Keeffe, proven by Conor O'Callaghan who witnessed the signing of his will, dated 10 March 1699. The document mentioned his wife, Joan Everard, and other relatives, including his brother Donagh McDaniel O'Keeffe. It also included the provision, "In case God should be pleased to restore my heir to the full estate of his father," reflecting the concern about the impending forfeiture of his lands during this politically unstable period. In 1703, O'Keefe was attainted for his loyalty to James II of England. The castle and approximately 5,000 acres of his land were confiscated and sold to the Hollow Sword Blade Company.

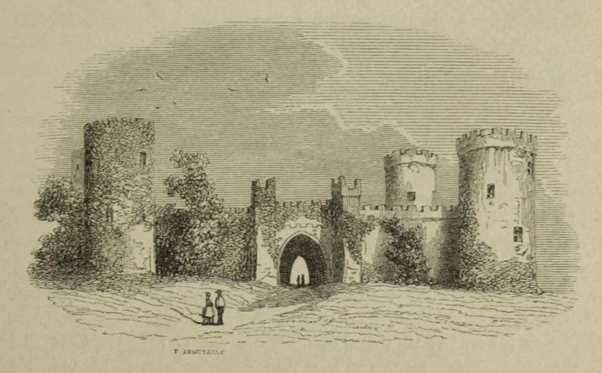
Historical illustration of Dromagh Castle from J. R. O'Flanagan's book The Blackwater in Munster, published in 1844. Illustrations supervised by Mr. Thomas Armstrong.

In the mid-19th century (1839–1852) the castle was owned by the Irish politician Nicholas Philpot Leader, who also served as a local justice of the peace and member of the Royal Irish Academy. Dromagh Castle was situated at the centre of the local coal or culm district, which extended to within 2.4 kilometers (1.5 miles) of Kanturk. Nicholas Philpot Leader is noted for having utilized this opportunity to extract coal and culm in considerable amounts.

=== The role of Dromagh Castle in the battle of Knocknaclashy (1651) ===
During the final stages of the Irish Confederate Wars, Dromagh Castle served as a strategic base for the armies of Viscount Muskerry. In July 1651, units of Muskerry's Confederate cavalry allegedly mustered at or near the castle before moving to engage Lord Broghill's Parliamentarian forces.

The resulting Battle of Knocknaclashy, fought on 26 July 1651 between Dromagh and Kanturk, was a decisive Parliamentarian victory. As a result of the defeat, the O'Keeffe family, were dispossessed of their land. After the Restoration of Charles II in 1660, the ownership of Dromagh Castle returned to the O'Keeffes.

=== Decline and destruction ===
Large country houses had often been raided by the Irish Republican Army (IRA) during the Irish War of Independence (1919–1921). According to local tradition, on the night of 16 March 1921, members of the Millstreet Battalion of the IRA set fire to the castle upon discovering that it was prepared for the use of the Auxiliary Division of the Royal Irish Constabulary. The Freeman's Journal, an Irish newspaper, reported that "about 100 men, wearing disguises, set the Castle on fire and also the farm buildings."

The fire destroyed nearly the entire structure, leaving only parts of the medieval walls and the corner towers intact, and although some of the lower buildings within the walls remained in use for some period following the fire, the castle itself was never restored. Following the death of the last Leader owner without heirs in 1931, the lands surrounding the site were transferred to the Irish Land Commission in the 1930s. Today, the remaining ruins are located on private grounds as part of a farm.

== Architecture ==
=== Structure and dimensions ===
Dromagh Castle was constructed as a rectangular structure measuring approximately 46 by 32 metres (50 by 35 yards), with an east-facing orientation. In each of the castle's four corners there are defense towers, round-shaped and approximately 15 metres (49 ft) high, connecting the perimetric battlements.

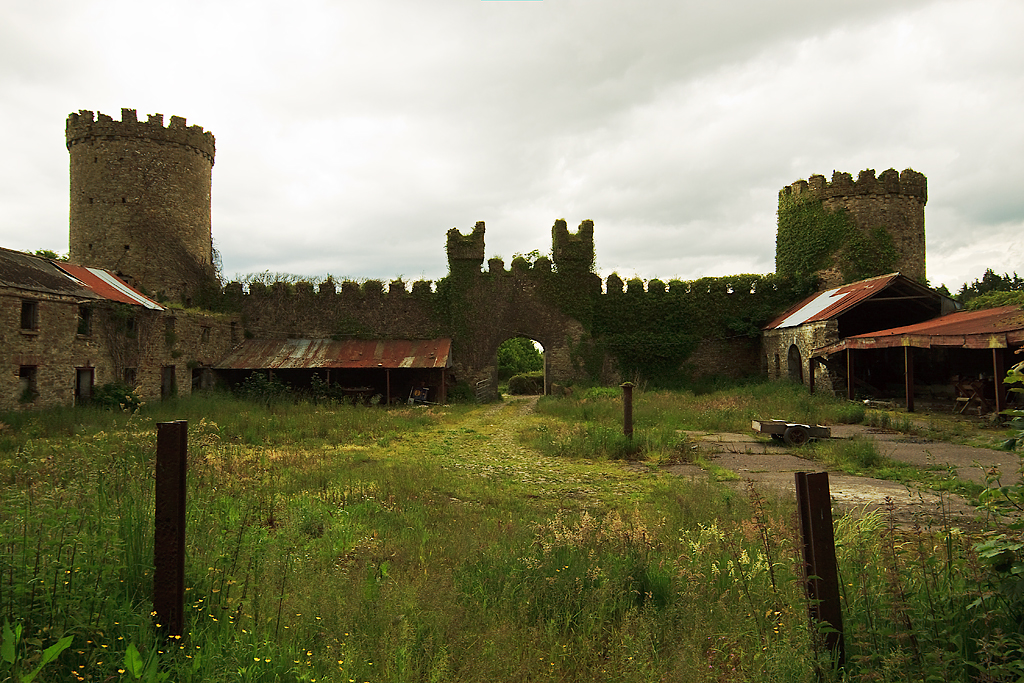
The main arched entrance of Dromagh Castle, with the northeast and southeast towers on either side, viewed from the inner courtyard (photographed in 2012).

An arched gateway forms the main entrance to the castle, while a smaller secondary gateway stands on the opposite side. Both entrances can be reached from the N72 road via two different paths, located less than one kilometre apart.

The castle was originally constructed with a tower house situated within its fortified enclosures, at the centre of the courtyard. Only the foundations of the tower now survive, though it was said to be approximately five storeys tall. The stronghold was designed with two moats: one surrounding the outer wall of the castle, and the other within the inner courtyard, which separated the main walls from the tower house.

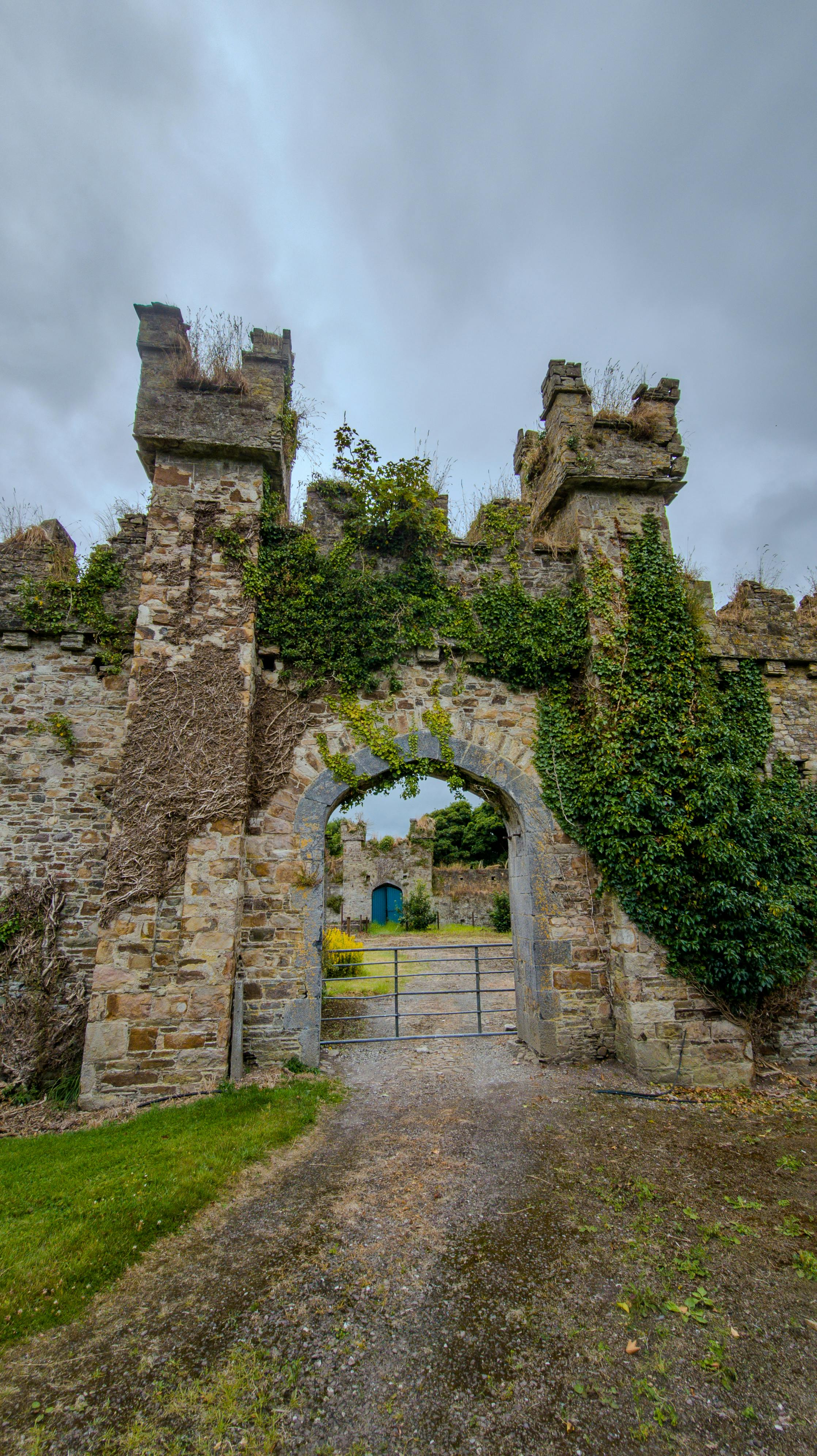
The gate of Dromagh Castle is a ruined stone archway with fragmented battlements, now partially covered in ivy and opening into the castle's inner courtyard.

During the 19th century, Dromagh Castle ceased to function as a fortified residence and was converted into a country house by the Leader family. Some architectural modifications were made to give the building a more domestic character, aligning it with the "Big House" tradition. These included fitting out the interior courtyard with offices and adding living accommodation within the circular corner towers. The towers were also heightened, and battlements were added to the outer defensive walls. However, the thinner walls and larger windows of these upper additions indicated that the alterations were primarily decorative rather than defensive, leading to its description as a "pasteboard castle".

=== Modern status ===
Following its destruction during the Irish War of Independence, Dromagh Castle remained in ruins. Although the buildings that were once part of the castle's fortification continue to exist, they show signs of extensive damage and partial collapse. The towers have lost their internal floors and roofs, and the site is now heavily overgrown with vegetation.

The ruins of Dromagh Castle are listed as a protected structure (RMP code CO028-041) by the National Monuments Service. The site lies on private farmland and is not accessible to the public, although it remains visible from the nearby N72 road.

Dromagh Castle is also included in the Cork County Development Plan 2014 and is recorded in the National Inventory of Architectural Heritage (NIAH).

== Folklore ==
Over the many centuries, many legends and oral traditions have grown around Dromagh Castle over the centuries, reflecting its long history and the cultural heritage of the surrounding region. Many of these tales have been transmitted through oral tradition and preserved among families in Duhallow and within the O'Keeffe clan.

According to local legend, the O'Keeffes hid a treasure of valuables within the castle during the Cromwellian wars to prevent it from falling into enemy hands. Despite several searches, the treasure was never found, and it remains part of the local folklore. This legend is similar to the historical difficulties the O'Keeffe family experienced, as Daniel O'Keeffe's will, dated 10 March 1699, referred to the possible recovery of family property, by indicating what his heir should do "in case God should be pleased to restore my heir to the full estate of his father," shortly before his extensive lands were confiscated in 1703.

Another widespread tale relates to an alleged underground tunnel leading from the castle to a local farm, supposedly used by several defenders to escape when the castle was besieged in the seventeenth century. While some local residents have claimed knowledge of the tunnel's exit point, no archaeological evidence has verified its existence. The castle also featured in major seventeenth-century conflicts, serving as a point of military action during the Irish Confederate Wars; Lord Muskerry is recorded as having marched cavalry from Dromagh Castle in 1652 to engage in the Battle of Knocknaclashy near Clonmeen.

A further legend relates to the "Field of the Spurs" (Páirc na Spúr), near the River Blackwater, where a battle is said to have occurred between the O'Keefes of Dromagh and forces loyal to O'Sullivan Beare. The name is traditionally explained by the discovery of cavalry equipment in the field following the conflict.

Another story concerns a mysterious inscribed stone allegedly once located in one of the castle's corner towers, bearing four partially legible Irish letters ("l, f, g, t"). Both the stone's meaning and location remain unknown.

Although unverified, these legends illustrate the enduring interest in Dromagh Castle and the interplay between historical memory and local folklore in the Irish landscape.

== See also ==
- Castles in Ireland
- Tower house
- Irish Confederate Wars
- O'Keeffe
- Castles in Great Britain and Ireland
