= Toby Barnard =

British historian

Toby Barnard FBA FRHistS
- Born: Toby Christopher Barnard; 17 April 1945 (age 81)

Academic background
- Education: The Queen's College, Oxford
- Thesis: The social policy of the Commonwealth and Protectorate in Ireland (1972)
- Doctoral advisor: Hugh Trevor-Roper

Academic work
- Discipline: History
- Sub-discipline: History of Ireland (1536-1691); History of Ireland (1691-1800); Political history; Commonwealth of England; Cromwellian conquest of Ireland
- Institutions: Royal Holloway, University of London; Hertford College, Oxford

Toby Christopher Barnard FBA FRHistS (born 17 April 1945) is a British historian, emeritus fellow in history at Hertford College, Oxford.

== Life ==
Barnard completed his undergraduate studies at the Queen's College, Oxford. However, he knew much about Hertford College prior to his arrival as a fellow from his history teacher at school, Stephen Pratt. Pratt had been a pupil of the previous generation of historians at Hertford, C. A. J. Armstrong and Felix Markham.

Barnard joined the college in 1976 and retired in 2012. With the arrival of Roy Foster as Carroll Professor of Irish History in 1991 and Tom Paulin as G. M. Young Lecturer in English Literature in 1994, Hertford became "the focus for Irish studies at Oxford" with a "triumvirate of Irish specialists".

Barnard was formerly lecturer in history at Royal Holloway (1970-1976). He is a specialist in the political, social and cultural histories of Ireland and England, c. 1600–1800. His A New Anatomy of Ireland (2003) was notable for the depth of primary research that Barnard carried out to complete it. One reviewer commented that "This task of discovery and accumulation by itself is an heroic achievement." Barnard is a fellow of the British Academy and the Royal Historical Society. He was supervised for his DPhil by Hugh Trevor-Roper.

== Works ==
- Barnard, Toby Christopher (1975). Cromwellian Ireland: English Government and Reform in Ireland 1649-1660. Oxford University Press. ISBN 0-19-820857-X.
- The English Republic, 1649-60. Longman, London, 1982. (Seminar Studies in History)
- The abduction of a Limerick heiress: Social and political relations in mid-eighteenth-century Ireland. Irish Academic Press, 1998. ISBN 0716527154
- Barnard, Toby, and Jane Fenlon (eds.). The Dukes of Ormonde, 1610-1745. Boydell Press, 2000. ISBN 978-0-85115-761-0 OCLC 44956083
- A new anatomy of Ireland: the Irish Protestants, 1649-1770. Yale University Press, 2003.
- Irish Protestant Ascents and Descents, 1641-1770. Four Courts Press, 2004. ISBN 1-85182-693-9
- Making the Grand Figure: Lives and possessions in Ireland, 1641-1700. Yale University Press, 2004. ISBN 0-300-10309-3 OCLC 54111545
- The Kingdom of Ireland, 1641-1760. Palgrave Macmillan, 2004. ISBN 0-333-61076-8
- A guide to the sources for the history of material culture in Ireland: 1500-2000. Four Courts Press, 2005. ISBN 1-85182-822-2 OCLC 61512061 OCLC 56642381 OCLC 232530969
- Improving Ireland? Projectors, prophets and profiteers, 1641-1786. Four Courts Press, 2008. ISBN 1-84682-055-3
- Murdoch, Tessa (ed.), foreword by Toby Barnard (2022). Great Irish Households: Inventories from the Long Eighteenth Century. Cambridge: John Adamson, foreword, pp. 11–15 ISBN 978-1-898565-17-8 OCLC 1233305993
- Brought to Book: Print in Ireland, 1680-1741. Four Courts Press, 2017. ISBN 9781846826290

=== Contributions to the Oxford Dictionary of National Biography ===
- Barnard, Toby (2004). "Boyle, Roger, first earl of Orrery (1621–1679)". In Matthew, Henry Colin Gray.; Harrison, Brian (eds.). Oxford Dictionary of National Biography. Vol. 7. New York: Oxford University Press. pp. 109–114. ISBN 0-19-861357-1. – Baron Broghill 1628 to 1660
- Barnard, Toby (2004). "Butler, James, first duke of Ormond (1610–1688)". In Matthew, Henry Colin Gray.; Harrison, Brian (eds.). Oxford Dictionary of National Biography. Vol. 9. New York: Oxford University Press. pp. 153–163. ISBN 0-19-861359-8.
