= Jigginstown Castle =

Castle built late 1630s near Dublin

- Caisleán Bhaile an tSigínigh
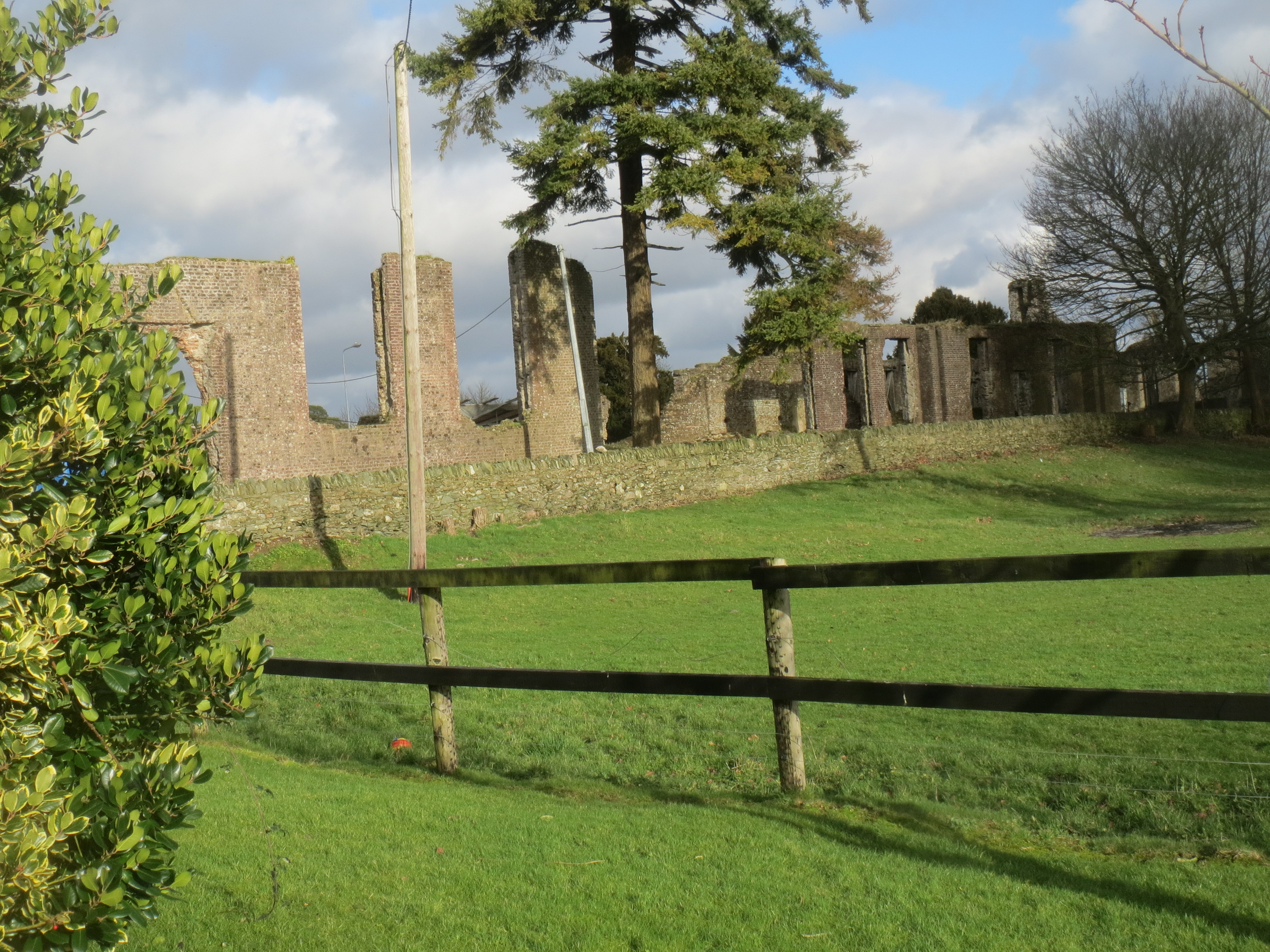

- Location within Ireland
- Alternative names: Strafford's Folly, Sigginstown Castle/House, Jigginstown House
- Etymology: Placename is first recorded in 1280 as Sigineston, meaning "Siggins' settlement"

General information
- Architectural style: Tudor
- Location: Jigginstown, Naas, Ireland
- Coordinates: 53.2139°N 6.6822°W
- Elevation: 92 metres (302 ft)
- Construction started: c. 1632
- Completed: late 1630s
- Destroyed: 1640s
- Cost: c. £6,000
- Owner: Irish state

Dimensions
- Other dimensions: Length 448 ft (137 m); facade length 380 ft (120 m)

Technical details
- Material: Red brick, marble, lead, steel
- Floor count: 3

Design and construction
- Architect: John Allen

Other information
- Public transit: Jiggstown Green bus stop (Bus Éireann routes 125, 126)

Jigginstown Castle is a ruined 17th-century house and National Monument near Naas, County Kildare, Ireland. It was constructed in the late 1630s when Ireland was under the reign of Charles I (1625–1649). At the time it was one of the largest buildings in Ireland, and the first to be constructed of red brick said to have been imported from Holland: the plans provided for pavement and columns of Kilkenny marble.

Jigginstown Castle was built on the periphery of an area known as The Pale, which was on the outskirts of Dublin. It was an area which was guarded on its outskirts by the English plantation settlers to protect valuables and livestock. The castle has also been previously known as Siggingstown Castle.

Thomas Wentworth, Earl of Strafford and Lord Lieutenant of Ireland in the 1630s, in his time the most powerful figure in Ireland, was responsible for the construction. His intention was for the castle to be a place where the King could reside on royal visits to Ireland. The downfall and execution for treason of Lord Strafford in 1641 meant that the house was never completed, and it was largely destroyed during the civil strife of the 1640s. According to Strafford's biographer Veronica Wedgwood, the ruins were still visible in the 1950s. The basement and castle's ground floor still stand to this day.
