= Mary Agnes Hickson =

Irish antiquarian and genealogist

- Born: 7 April 1821; Tralee, County Kerry
- Died: 6 April 1899 (aged 77); Mitchelstown, County Cork
- Occupations: Antiquarian and genealogist

Mary Agnes Hickson (7 April 1821 – 6 April 1899) was an Irish antiquarian and genealogist.

== Biography ==
Mary Agnes Hickson was born in Tralee, Kerry on 7 April 1821 to John James Hickson and Sarah Day. She was able to trace her family, through her mother to Anne Blennerhassett of 1694 and Denis McGillicuddy of McGillycuddy of the Reeks. Hickson was educated locally and at a boarding school and was a good student. The family suffered a financial set back during the Irish Famine when their tenants were unable to pay the rents leaving the family unable to pay their own rents and they had to sell land. Hickson lived in rooms with her mother until her death and then with relatives in Ireland and Great Britain until eventually returning to live in County Kerry. Hickson wrote for the Kerry Evening Post with a series called the Old Kerry Records. She joined the Royal Society of Antiquaries of Ireland. A renowned genealogist and historian, Hickson wrote three volumes of histories about Ireland and Kerry. She focused heavily on the Blennerhassett family.

Hickson is now recognised for her different perspective on Irish history as a financially insecure Protestant Unionist during a time when nationalism was the growing movement. She was friends with significant figures in the field including W.E.H. Lecky. Her work on the history of Ireland in 1641 created controversy about the veracity of testimonies about the violence of Irish Catholics against Protestant settlers. Though attempting to be as unbiased as possible she overestimated the number of Protestants killed significantly. Hickson was concerned by the lack of attention given to this interpretation. Her work was not aimed at appealing to the popular. The preface was written by James Anthony Froude. Transcriptions she made are currently in the London library of Society of Genealogists and the National Library of Ireland. She lived at "Hillville" in Cloghane, County Kerry. Her father built this on the site of an earlier house in 1833. Hickson died in Kingston College, Mitchelstown in 1899 and was brought home to be buried in Tralee.

== Bibliography ==
- Ireland in the seventeenth century: or, the Irish massacres of 1641-2: their causes and results, (1884)
- Selections from old Kerry records, Historical and Genealogical, (1856)
- The Old Countess of Desmond: a new solution of an old puzzle, Reliquary 22, (1881)
- Ardfert Friary and the Fitzmaurices, Lords of Kerry, (1895)
