= Richard Swanley =

British Royal Navy commander

- Died: September 1650
- Occupation: Royal Navy commander

Richard Swanley (died September 1650) was an English Royal Navy commander.

== Biography ==
Swanley is probably to be identified with the Richard Swanley, a commander in the East India Company's service, who in 1623 went out as master of the Great James with Captain John Weddell, and was in her in the four days' fight with the Portuguese near Ormuz, on 1–4 February 1625; but there was another captain of the name in the company's service at the same time, and the identification cannot be ascertained beyond doubt. In the summer of 1642 Swanley commanded the Charles in the Narrow Seas, and took a prominent part in the operations against Chichester, and in the reduction of the Isle of Wight for the parliament. He co-operated with William Waller against Portsmouth, and after its fall on 7 September 1642 summoned Southampton. In the fleet of 1643 Swanley commanded the Bonaventure of 34 guns as admiral of the Irish seas, and for good service in capturing the Fellowship of 28 guns in Milford Haven both he and William Smith, the vice-admiral, were granted by the parliament a chain of the value of 200l. In February 1644 he came off Milford Haven in the Leopard, and his squadron landed two hundred men to assist Colonel Rowland Laugharne against the royalists; and he was next ordered to cruise against an expected attempt from Brittany (Cal. State Papers, Dom. 1 and 15 June 1644). He continued serving throughout the summer, co-operating with the army in Pembrokeshire, and taking care that reinforcements from Ireland should not reach the royalists. One vessel laden with troops he captured, offered the covenant to the English on board, and flung the Irish into the sea (Gardiner, Civil War, i. 337). In the following summer he was again afloat, but in August was, on some charges which seemingly could not be sustained, superseded by Robert Moulton. On investigation it was determined to reinstate Richard Swanley, and he was accordingly appointed to the Lion, in which he continued, still on the same station and on similar service, till towards the end of 1647. He was afloat in July, but in November had left the sea, and in the following January was petitioning to have his accounts passed. For the next few years he resided at Limehouse, where he died in September 1650. He was buried in the churchyard of Stepney (Lysons, Environs of London, iii. 434, Suppl. 1811, p. 441). In his will (in Somerset House: Pembroke 149), dated 28 May 1649, and proved on 11 Sept. 1650, he mentions his wife Elizabeth, a daughter Mary, and two sons John and Richard, the latter of whom may probably be identified with the Richard Swanley bound apprentice to the East India Company in December 1633, who served afterwards in the navy, and was master of the Revenge in 1669.
