= Patrick Corish =

Priest, historian, President of Maynooth College

Patrick Corish (1921 - 2013) was a priest of the Diocese of Ferns, born in Ballycullane parish in County Wexford. He is best known as a distinguished Irish historian and a President of St. Patrick's College, Maynooth. For many years, he was Professor of Ecclesiastical History in Saint Patrick's College Maynooth, in succession to the late Cardinal Tomás Ó Fiaich.

== Career ==
Although he published many academic articles and was in demand as a reviewer Corish is best known for two books: The Irish Catholic Experience(1985), a one volume history of Catholicism in Ireland, and Maynooth College 1795-1995 (1995), published for the bi-centenary of Maynooth College. In addition, he was editor of the sources journal Archivium Hibernicum.

He had an extraordinarily long association with Maynooth College which started in 1939 when he arrived to commence his studies for the priesthood. He was ordained in the College Chapel on 17 June 1945, received a Doctorate in Theology and was appointed Professor of Ecclesiastical History in Saint Patrick's College, Maynooth in 1947. Twenty years later, in 1967, he was made College President but served only one year before resuming his duties as Professor of Ecclesiastical History. He was succeeded as president by Jeremiah Newman.

In his retirement, he took great delight in developing the rock garden which was part of the original walled garden in the College. In 1984 he joined the Alpine Garden Society and raised many plants from seed in the quarter acre garden.

He died in 2013 and is buried in the College cemetery. One obituary referred to Monsignor Paddy having "a sense of innocent mischief, or as some might say wicked cynicism fuelled at times with dark forebodings." While in his homily at the Requiem Mass, Bishop Denis Brennan of the Diocese of Ferns spoke of how Monsignor Corish "had developed an impish, good-humoured line in pessimism."

Since his death, an annual Monsignor Patrick J Corish Lecture has been held by Maynooth College in his memory.
