= Felix Markham =

British historian

Felix Maurice Hippisley Markham (1908 in Brighton – 1992) was a British historian, known for his biography of Napoleon.

Markham studied both Literae humaniores and modern history at Balliol College, Oxford. He was Fellow and History Tutor at Hertford College, Oxford, from 1931 until 1973.

Markham corresponded with film director Stanley Kubrick over a never-realised project of Kubrick's on Napoleon.

== Publications ==
- Napoleon, New American Library 1963, new edition, edited by Steve Englund, Signet Classics 2010
- Napoleon and the Awakening of Europe, English Universities Press 1954, Collier Books 1965
- The Bonapartes, New York, Taplinger Publishing 1975
- Herausgeber: Henri Comte de Saint-Simon, 1760–1825: Selected Writings, Blackwell 1952
- "The Napoleonic Adventure", in The New Cambridge Modern History, Volume 9, 1965
- Oxford, London 1975, preface by C. M. Bowra
