= Ahane, County Kerry =

Coordinates: 52.359°N 9.366°W

- Townland
- Interactive map of Ahane, County Kerry
- Country: Ireland

Ahane (Irish: Áthán) is a small townland approximately 8 kilometres (5 mi) west/northwest of Brosna village in County Kerry. It is close to the border with County Limerick. The area consists mostly of dairy farms. As of the 2011 census, it had a population of 32 people in 11 houses. Ahane townland is in the historic barony of Trughanacmy, and has an area of approximately 2.5 square kilometres (1 sq mi).
