= Ayano Ahane =

J-pop Japanese singer and songwriter (born 1981)

Ayano Ahane 亜波根 綾乃
- Born: January 6, 1981 (age 45); Okinawa, Japan
- Occupations: Singer, songwriter
- Years active: 1996–1999

Ayano Ahane (亜波根 綾乃, Ahane Ayano; born January 6, 1981) is a J-pop Japanese singer and songwriter who was active in the 1990s.

== Discography ==
=== Singles ===
Release date	Title	Comments
Oct 23, 1996	Ookina Kaze (大きな風)	debut single
Feb 26, 1997	Gambare Watashi (がんばれ私)	
May 14, 1997	Hikouki-gumo no Sora no Shita (ひこうき雲の空の下)	
Oct 22, 1997	Prism (プリズム)	
Feb 25, 1998	Lucky Goes On! -Shiawase ga Yuku- (しあわせがゆく)	
Apr 22, 1998	Kokoro no Chizu (心の地図)	
Aug 5, 1998	Chiisana Yuuki (小さな勇気)	
July 29, 1998	Harukana Watashi-tachi e(遥かなわたしたちへ) ~eternal ribbon in the air~	
Nov 5, 1998	warmth	
Mar 25, 1999	All my life/Ikiru Ashioto (生きる足音)	
Aug 25, 1999	My home	

=== Albums ===
Release date	Title	Comments
July 16, 1997	A-ray	debut album
Sept 9, 1998	Lin Nai～Fine Art Museum～	second original album
Mar 17, 1999	affettuoso	mini-album containing 6 tracks which are orchestra remixes of her previously released songs
Sept 22, 1999	Re.Birth	third original album
Dec 22, 1999	Best Selection	best-of album
