= James de Barry, 4th Viscount Buttevant =

Irish viscount (1520–1581)

James de Barry
- Viscount Buttevant
- Tenure: 1561–1581
- Predecessor: James Barry, 3rd Viscount
- Successor: David Barry, 5th Viscount
- Born: 1520
- Died: 10 April 1581 (aged 60–61); Dublin Castle
- Spouse: Ellen MacCarthy Reagh
- Issue Detail: David & others
- Father: Richard de Barry
- Mother: Isabel FitzGerald

James de Barry, 4th Viscount Buttevant and 17th Baron Barry (1520–1581) was an Irish magnate. He joined the rebels in the Desmond Rebellion and died in captivity at Dublin Castle.

== Birth and origins ==
James was born in 1520, probably at Rathbarry in Barryroe barony, eldest son of Richard de Barry and Isabel FitzGerald. His father was a son of James de Barry, Lord of Ibane, and his wife Elane MacCarthy of Muskerry. James's full name, inclusive of the patronymic, therefore was James FitzRichard de Barry.

His mother was a daughter of Sir James FitzGerald of Leixlip, a younger son of Gerald FitzGerald, 8th Earl of Kildare.

Family tree

James de Barry with wife, parents, and other selected relatives. (Note: This family tree is based on genealogies of the de Barrys.)

Richard de Barry	Isabel; FitzGerald
James de Barry; 4th Viscount; Buttevant; 1520–1581	Ellen; MacCarthy	David; 5th Viscount; Fermoy d. 1582
David; 5th Viscount c. 1550 – 1617	Ellen; Roche	Richard; Power; 4th Baron
David de Barry d. 1604 d.v.p.*	Elizabeth; Power	Richard; 1st Earl; Cork; 1566–1643
David Barry; 1st Earl; Barrymore; 1604–1642	Alice; Boyle

Legend

XXX	Subject of the article	XXX	Viscounts Buttevant and Earls of Barrymore	XXX	Viscounts; Fermoy

*d.v.p. = predeceased his father (decessit vita patris)

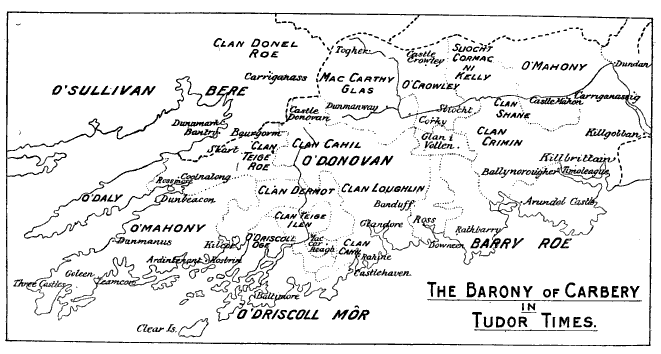
Carbery in Tudor times

== Marriage and children ==
Before 1550 Barry married Ellen (also called Ilene), an illegitimate daughter of Cormac na Haoine MacCarthy Reagh, 13th Prince of Carbery. This was a very good marriage for him, as a member of a cadet branch of the Barry dynasty.

James and Ellen had five sons:

1. Richard (died 1622), born deaf and dumb, was passed over in the succession and died unmarried.
2. David (1550–1617), the second son, succeeded as the 5th Viscount
3. William Barry, of Lislee.
4. Edmund Barry, married Eleanora, daughter of James Butler, Baron Dunboyne.
5. John Barry (died 1627)

—and five daughters, of which four are known by name:

1. Joan, married David Roche, 7th Viscount Fermoy
2. Honora, married Patrick Condon
3. Eleanor, married Sir Owen O'Sullivan, knight
4. Ilane, married Callaghan MacTeighe MacCarthy of Muskerry

== Viscount Buttevant, later life, and death ==
His predecessor in the viscountcy, James Fitz John Barry, died childless in 1558. Barry was his cousin but not his heir, but he seized the land and usurped the title.

In 1567 Buttevant was knighted in Limerick by the Henry Sidney, the Lord Deputy.

In 1570 Buttevant received a lease, to hold for twenty-one years, of "the site of the house of the friars at Killnamullagh, alias Buttevante, County Cork, with its appurtenances at an annual rent of 16 shillings and 8 pence".

In 1575 Barry received a pardon.

In 1579 at the outbreak of the second Desmond Rebellion, Buttevant as well as David, his son and successor, joined the rebels. Buttevant was arrested in July 1680 and detained at Dublin Castle where he died on 10 April 1581.

In the subsequent confiscations of his estates, the Buttevant Franciscan Friary, together with its glebe, passed into the hands of the poet, Edmund Spenser.

== Notes and references ==
=== Sources ===
- Barry, E. (1902). Barrymore: Records of the Barrys of County Cork. Cork: Guy and Co.
- Barry, Judy (October 2009). McGuire, James; Quinn, James (eds.). "Barry, David Fitz-James". Dictionary of Irish Biography.
- Cokayne, George Edward (1910). Gibbs, Vicary (ed.). The complete peerage of England, Scotland, Ireland, Great Britain and the United Kingdom, extant, extinct, or dormant. Vol. I (2nd ed.). London: St Catherine Press. OCLC 228661424. – Ab-Adam to Basing (for Barry)
- Burke, Bernard (1866). A Genealogical History of the Dormant, Abeyant, Forfeited and Extinct Peerages of the British Empire (New ed.). London: Harrison. OCLC 11501348.
- Dunlop, Robert; Cunningham, Bernadette (2004). "Roche, David, seventh viscount Roche of Fermoy (1573?–1635)". In Matthew, Colin; Harrison, Brian (eds.). Oxford Dictionary of National Biography. Vol. 47. New York: Oxford University Press. pp. 460–461. ISBN 0-19-861397-0.
- McGurk, J. J. N. (2004). "Barry, David fitz James, de facto third Viscount Buttevant (1550–1617)". In Matthew, Henry Colin Gray; Harrison, Brian (eds.). Oxford Dictionary of National Biography. Vol. 4. New York: Oxford University Press. p. 121. ISBN 0-19-861354-7.
- Shaw, William A. (1906). The Knights of England. Vol. II. London: Sherratt & Hughes. – Knights bachelors & Index

Peerage of Ireland
Preceded by James Barry	Viscount Buttevant; 1581–1617	Succeeded by David Barry
