= Somerset Light Infantry =

13th Regiment of Foot Somerset Light Infantry (Prince Albert's)
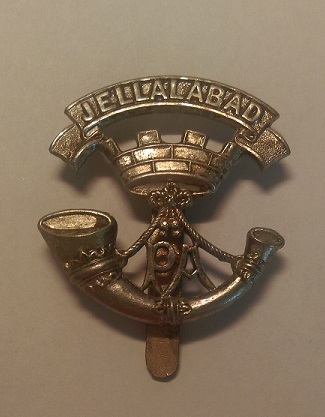
- The regimental cap badge
- Active: 1685–1959
- Country: Kingdom of England (to 1707) Kingdom of Great Britain (1707–1800) United Kingdom (1801–1959)
- Branch: British Army
- Type: Infantry
- Role: Light infantry
- Size: 1–2 regular battalions 1–2 militia and special reserve battalions 1–3 volunteer and territorial battalions Up to 13 hostilities-only battalions
- Garrison/HQ: Jellalabad Barracks, Taunton
- Nicknames: The Bleeders; The Illustrious Garrison; The Jellalabad Heroes
- Colors: Yellow facings until 1842, blue thereafter
- March: Prince Albert's March
- Engagements: Nine Years War; War of the Spanish Succession; War of 1812; First Anglo-Afghan War; Second Boer War; World War I World War II; Malayan Emergency; Suez Crisis

The Somerset Light Infantry (Prince Albert's) was a light infantry regiment of the British Army, which served under various titles from 1685 to 1959. In 1959, the regiment was amalgamated with the Duke of Cornwall's Light Infantry to form the Somerset and Cornwall Light Infantry which was again amalgamated, in 1968, with the King's Own Yorkshire Light Infantry, the King's Shropshire Light Infantry, and the Durham Light Infantry to form The Light Infantry. In 2007, however, The Light Infantry was amalgamated further with the Devonshire and Dorset Regiment, the Royal Gloucestershire, Berkshire and Wiltshire Regiment, and the Royal Green Jackets to form The Rifles.

== History ==
=== Early history ===
==== Formation ====
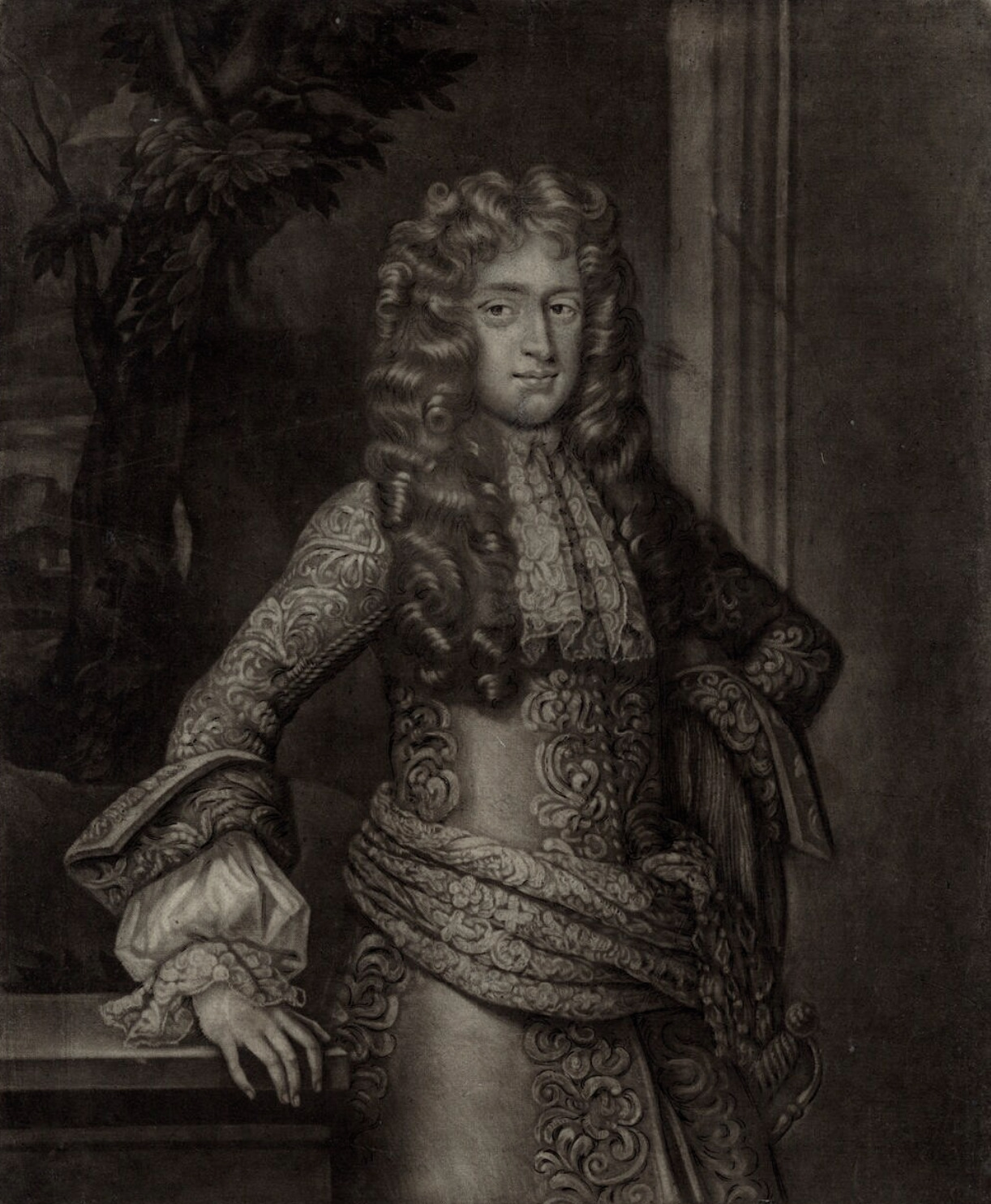
The Earl of Huntingdon, the founder of the regiment

Regimental line infantryman, grenadier and pikeman in 1686

The regiment was one of nine regiments of foot raised by James II when he expanded the size of the army in response to the Monmouth Rebellion. On 20 June 1685, Theophilus Hastings, 7th Earl of Huntingdon was issued with a warrant authorising him to raise a regiment, and accordingly the Earl of Huntingdon's Regiment of Foot was formed, mainly recruiting in the county of Buckinghamshire.

==== Jacobite wars ====
The regiment remained in existence when William III came to the throne in the Glorious Revolution of 1688. Ferdinando Hastings took over the colonelcy of the regiment, which accordingly became Hastings's Regiment of Foot. Hastings's Regiment first saw action at the Battle of Killiecrankie in July 1689, which was lost to the Jacobite forces. The regiment accompanied William to Ireland in the following year, fighting in the decisive Williamite victories at the Boyne and Cork.

==== Nine Years' War ====
The Jacobite struggles in Scotland and Ireland were part of a wider European conflict that became known as the Nine Years' War. In 1692, Hastings' Regiment sailed to Flanders and, in 1694, took part in the disastrous amphibious assault at Camaret on the French coast. In 1695, Colonel Fernando Hastings was found guilty of extortion, and dismissed. Sir John Jacob became the colonel, and it was as Jacob's Regiment of Foot that they returned to England at the end of the war in 1697.

==== War of the Spanish Succession ====
After a period of garrison duty in Ireland, Jacob's Regiment returned to Flanders in 1701. In the following year, the colonelcy again changed, with Sir John Jacob choosing to retire. He sold the colonelcy to his brother-in-law, Lieutenant-General James Barry, 4th Earl of Barrymore, for 1,400 guineas. With the outbreak of the War of the Spanish Succession, the Earl of Barrymore's Regiment of Foot saw action at the sieges or battles of Kaiserwerth, Venlo, Roermond, Huy, Limburg, and Liège.

In 1704, Barrymore's Regiment moved to the Iberian Peninsula taking part in the defence of the recently captured Gibraltar (1704–05) and the Siege of Barcelona (1705). In 1706, the bulk of the regiment was converted into a regiment of dragoons due to a shortage of cavalry. Barrymore returned to England with a small cadre; the regiment was re-raised and returned to Spain. The unit fought at the Battle of Almanza (1707), the Battle of La Caya (1709), the Battle of Tortosa (1711) and the Battle of St Mateo (1711). In 1711, the regiment started a long period of garrison duty at Gibraltar. In 1715, they became Cotton's Regiment of Foot when Stanhope Cotton succeeded Barrymore.

==== Anglo-Spanish War ====
When war broke out with Spain in 1727, Cotton's were part of the force that resisted the Spanish Siege of Gibraltar. The regiment returned to England in the following year. It remained there until 1742, with the name changing with the colonelcy: Kerr's Regiment of Foot (Lord Mark Kerr) in 1725, Middleton's Regiment of Foot (Brigadier-General John Middleton) in 1732 and Pulteney's Regiment of Foot (General Harry Pulteney) in 1739.

==== War of the Austrian Succession ====
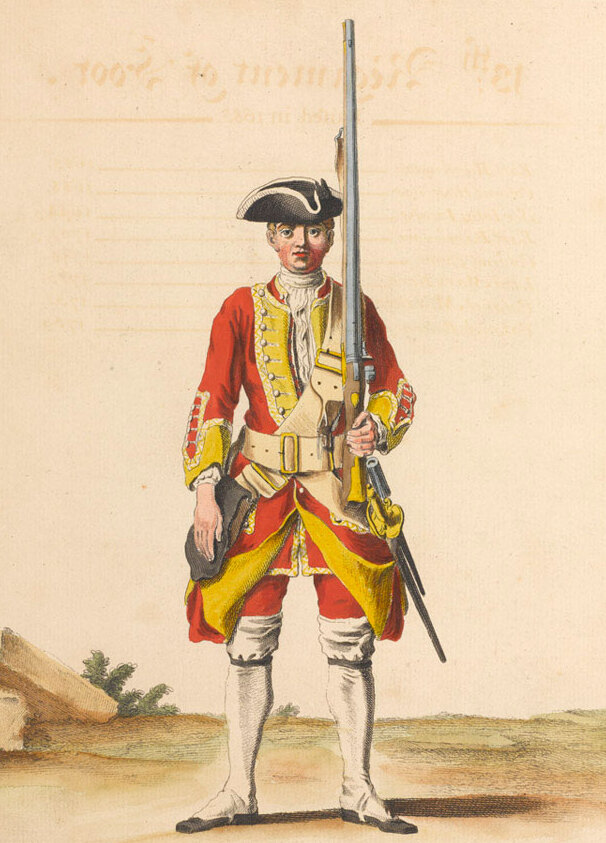
c. 1742 engraving of a regimental private

In 1742, Pulteney's Regiment sailed to Flanders, and in the following year was part of the joint British, Hanoverian and Austrian force that secured a victory over the French at the Battle of Dettingen in June 1743. In May 1745, the situation was reversed when they were part of the allied army closely defeated at the Battle of Fontenoy.

==== The "Forty Five" ====
In 1745, Pulteney's Regiment returned to Britain, moving to Scotland to suppress the Jacobite rising of 1745. They formed part of the defeated forces at the Battle of Falkirk in January 1746. Three months later, they took part in the final defeat of the Jacobites in Culloden.

==== Return to Europe ====
Following the ending of the Jacobite rising, Pulteney's Regiment returned to Flanders, where they fought at the Battle of Rocoux (October 1746) and the Battle of Lauffeld or Val (July 1747). In both cases, the allied forces were defeated by the French. The regiment returned to England in 1747, and the war was formally ended by the Treaty of Aix-la-Chapelle in 1748.

=== 13th Regiment of Foot ===
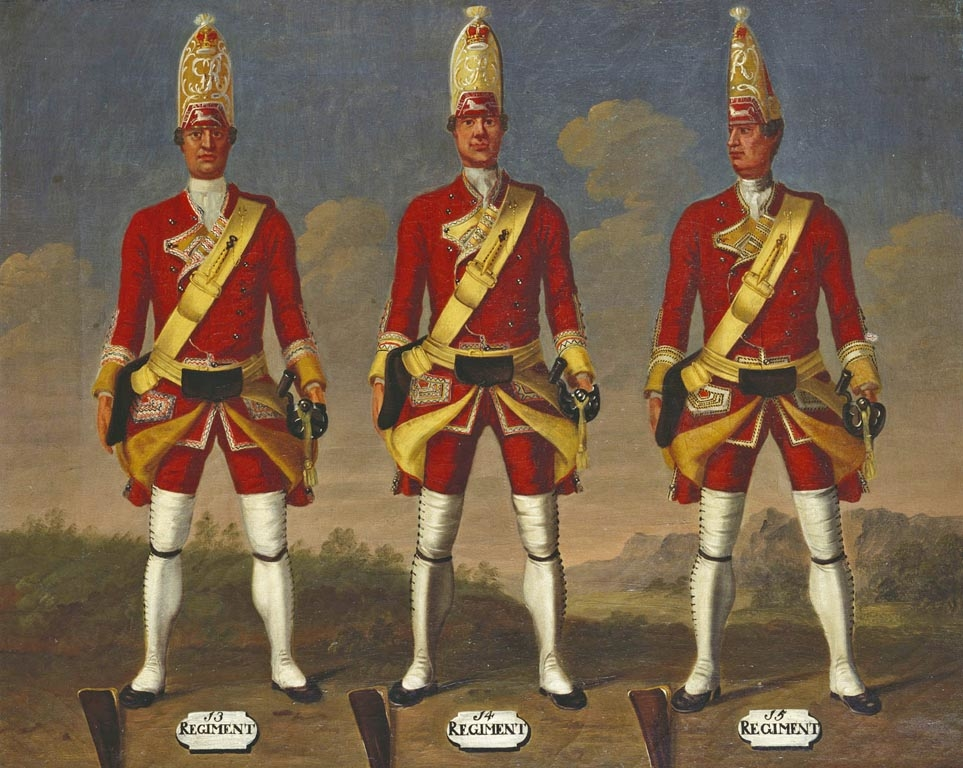
c. 1751 painting of a regimental grenadier (left)

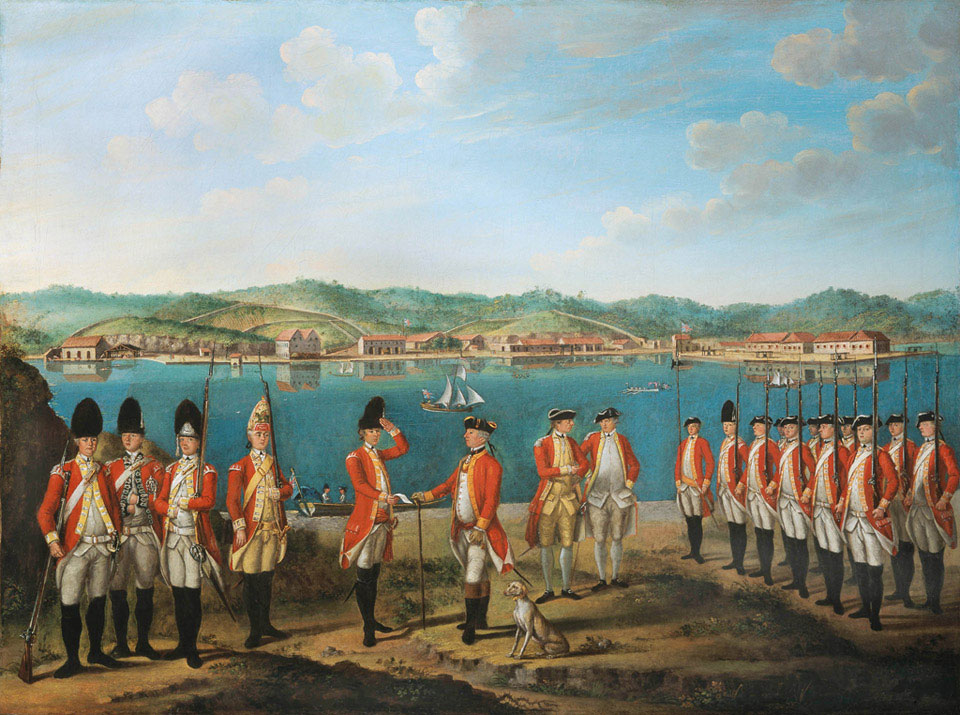
c. 1771 painting of a regimental grenadier (first from left) in Minorca

By the late seventeenth century, each regiment of the standing army had been allotted a "rank" in the order of precedence. These numbers came to be increasingly used until a royal warrant of 1751 decreed that regiments should in future be known by their numbers only. Accordingly, Pulteney's Regiment became the 13th Regiment of Foot. The redesignated 13th Foot entered a thirty-year period of garrison service in England, Ireland, Gibraltar and Minorca.

==== American War of Independence ====
In 1775 the American War of Independence broke out, widening into war with France from 1778 and Spain in 1779. The 13th Foot sailed for the West Indies, arriving in Barbados. They saw little active service, returning to England in 1782, moving on to Ireland in 1783.

=== 13th (1st Somersetshire) Regiment of Foot ===
It was at this time that the regiment's link to Somerset was first formed. On 21 August 1782, the Commander-in-Chief of the Forces, Henry Seymour Conway, issued a regulation giving an English county designation to each regiment of foot other than those with a royal title or highland regiments. The intention was to improve recruitment during the unpopular war, and the Secretary at War, Thomas Townshend issued a circular letter to the lieutenants of each county in England in the following terms:

My Lord,
The very great deficiency of men in the regiments of infantry being so very detrimental to the public service, the king has thought proper to give the names of the different counties to the old corps, in hopes that, by the zeal and activity of the principal nobility and gentry in the several counties, some considerable assistance may be given towards recruiting these regiments".

The regiment duly became the 13th (1st Somersetshire) Regiment of Foot (the 40th Foot becoming the "2nd Somersetshire"). The attempt to link regimental areas to specific counties was found to be impractical, with regiments preferring to recruit from major centres of population. By June 1783, each regiment was again recruiting throughout the country, although the county names were to remain.

==== French Revolutionary and Napoleonic Wars ====
In 1790, the regiment sailed to Jamaica. In 1793, Britain was again at war with France, this time with the revolutionary régime. The 13th Foot landed in the French colony of Saint-Domingue, where the Haitian Revolution was in progress.

Returning to Ireland in 1797 and England in 1799, the 13th were next engaged in a series of minor coastal assaults on the Spanish coast in 1800.

In 1801, the regiment sailed to Egypt to help repel the French invasion force. The 13th took part in the Siege of Alexandria. In 1802, the regiment was awarded the badge of a sphinx superscribed "Egypt" for display on the regimental colours in commemoration of the campaign.

A temporary end to hostilities with France came in March 1802, with the signing of the Treaty of Amiens. The 13th Foot left Egypt in that month, sailing to Malta, where they were stationed for a year, before moving to Gibraltar. In 1805, the regiment returned to England. After occupying various stations in the south of the country, the 13th sailed for Ireland in May 1807. The regiment was brought up to full strength by an intake of volunteers from the Irish militia and sailed to Bermuda, arriving in March 1808. The regiment lost large numbers of men to disease while on the island. War had again broken out with France, and the 13th Foot formed part of the force that invaded and occupied the French colony of Martinique in January and February 1809.

==== War with the United States ====
In 1812, the war had widened to include the United States of America. In the following year, the 13th Foot left Martinique for Quebec, from whence they proceeded to protect the frontiers of Upper Canada. The regiment crossed the Saint Lawrence River and took part in minor actions around Plattsburgh and Lake Champlain. The war concluded in 1815, and the 13th Foot returned to England in July of that year.

The regiment spent the next few years on garrison duty in Jersey, Guernsey, England, Scotland and Ireland.

=== 13th (1st Somersetshire) Regiment (Light Infantry) ===
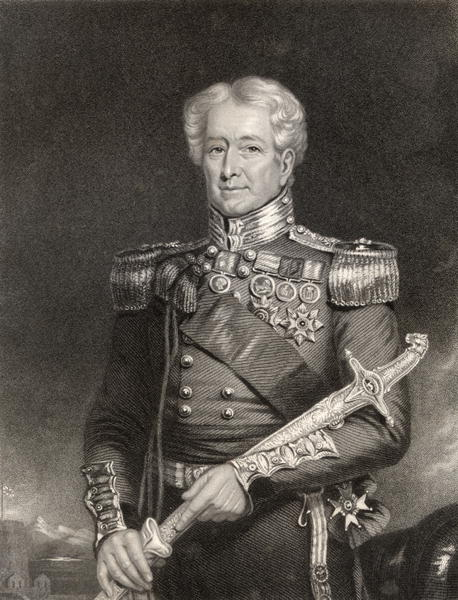
Sir Robert Sale, commanding officer of the regiment during the Burmese and Afghanistan campaigns, and colonel from 1843–1846

In September 1822, the 13th Foot was moved to Chatham in Kent, where it was brought up to strength for service in India. While there, it was reconstituted as a light infantry regiment in December and was retitled as the 13th (1st Somersetshire) Regiment (Light Infantry).

==== First Anglo-Burmese War ====
The 13th Light Infantry arrived in Kolkata in May and June 1823. Soon after arrival, Burmese forces attacked Cachar, a territory under British protection. War was formally declared on 5 March 1824, and the 13th took part in the campaign that lasted until February 1826, when a treaty was signed, with the King of Ava agreeing to cede territory and pay compensation to the British East India Company.

The 13th Light Infantry returned to garrison duty in India. From 1826 to 1838, they were stationed in Baharampur, Danapur, Agra and Karnal.

==== First Anglo-Afghan War ====
In 1837, Persian troops, allied to the Russians, occupied the Herat region of Afghanistan. The British, who feared Russian intervention in the area, decided to remove the emir of Afghanistan – Dost Muhammad – and to replace him with a pro-British monarch, Shuja Shah Durrani. Accordingly, an expeditionary force, known as the "Army of the Indus", was formed. The 13th Light Infantry formed part of the invasion force, joining the other units in November 1838. The army passed into Afghanistan in March 1839, taking Kandahar in April without resistance. The 13th took part in the decisive victory at Ghazni in July 1839. The British initially achieved their objective of enthroning Shuja in August 1839. The 13th formed part of the occupation force that attempted to enforce the rule of the new monarch; but, in October 1841, a popular uprising against Shuja broke out. The 13th found itself engaged in operations against the rebels who had overthrown Shuja and taken the capital, Kabul. In November 1841, the regiment was forced to retreat to the fortified town of Jalalabad.

The town was soon encircled, leading to a lengthy siege. In April of the following year, the garrison, under the command of Sir Robert Sale of the 13th, broke the siege and defeated the Afghan forces under Akbar Khan. Although the war, which ended in October 1842 with the return of the Army of the Indus to India, was essentially a reverse for the British forces, battle honours and campaign medals were awarded.

=== 13th (1st Somersetshire) (Prince Albert's Light Infantry) Regiment of Foot ===
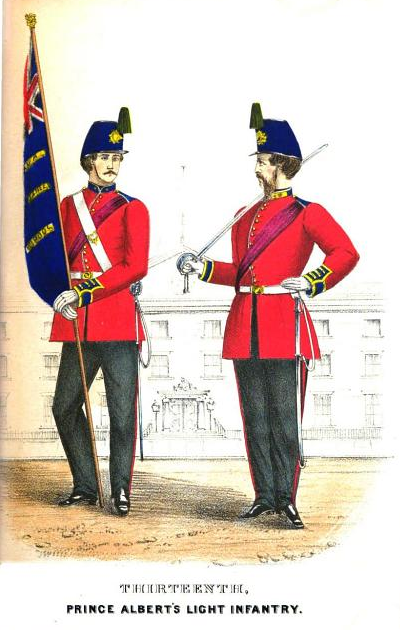
Standard bearer and officer in uniform of 1866. The dark blue facings authorised in 1842 appear on the tunic and regimental colours. The green feather plume on the shako head dress was a distinguishing mark for a light infantry regiment.

The conduct of the 13th at Jalalabad was officially rewarded on 26 August 1842, when Prince Albert offered his patronage to the regiment and permitted his name to be used in its title, becoming the 13th (1st Somersetshire) (Prince Albert's Light Infantry) Regiment of Foot. At the same time, the regimental facings were changed from yellow to (royal) blue, and the badge of a mural crown with a scroll inscribed "Jellalabad" was granted for display on the colours and uniform of the regiment. The unit was also honoured with the firing of a twenty-one gun salute at each army station it passed on its return to India.

The 13th Light Infantry returned to England in 1845 after 23 years of foreign service. Presented with new colours at Portsmouth in 1846, the regiment moved to Ireland in the following year, remaining there until 1850, before spending a year in Scotland. From 1851–1854, they were stationed in Gibraltar.

==== Crimean War ====
In 1854, the regiment was brought up to full strength and, in June of the following year, landed in the Crimea as part of the Anglo-French forces conducting a campaign against the Russians. They took part in the Siege of Sevastopol, and remained in the area after the ending of hostilities in February 1856, subsequently sailing to South Africa.

==== Return to India ====
In May 1857, the Indian Mutiny broke out. Reinforcements were requested, and the 13th arrived at Kolkata in October 1857. They took part in some minor actions.

The 1st Battalion saw active service in South Africa from 1877 to 1879, in the Bapedi (Sekukuni) campaign of 1878 to 1879, and in the Anglo-Zulu War of 1879.

==== Formation of second battalion ====
The British Army had been shown to be overstretched by the Crimean War, while the mutiny in India had led to the responsibility for providing a garrison in the subcontinent from the Honourable East India Company to the Crown forces. Accordingly, there was a need for an expansion and reorganisation of the existing regiments. Rather than raising new infantry regiments, the senior regiments of foot were each ordered to raise a second battalion, with the existing regiment being redesignated as the 1st Battalion. The 2nd Battalion of the 13th Light Infantry was raised at Winchester in January 1858. The two battalions, while sharing a depot, operated as separate units.

Locations of the battalions 1858–1881
1st Battalion	2nd Battalion
India 1858–1864	England 1858–1859, South Africa 1859–1863
England 1864–1866	Mauritius 1863–1867
Ireland 1866–1867	Mauritius 1863–1867
Gibraltar 1867–1872	England 1867–1871
Malta 1872–1874	Ireland 1871–1875
South Africa 1874–1879	Scotland 1875–1876, England 1876–1877
England 1879–1881	Malta 1877–1877, South Africa 1875–1881

The 1st Battalion saw active service in South Africa after 1875, fighting in the Bapedi campaign against Sekukuni in 1878 and Anglo-Zulu War of 1879.

=== Prince Albert's (Somerset Light Infantry) ===
==== Childers reforms ====
The regiment was not fundamentally affected by the Cardwell Reforms of the 1870s, which gave it a depot at Jellalabad Barracks in Taunton from 1873, or by the Childers reforms of 1881 – as it already possessed two battalions, there was no need for it to amalgamate with another regiment. Under the reforms the regiment became the Prince Albert's Light Infantry (Somersetshire Regiment) on 1 July 1881. As the county regiment of Somersetshire, it also gained the county's militia and rifle volunteer battalions, which were integrated into the regiment as numbered battalions. Within months the regiment had been retitled to Prince Albert's (Somersetshire Light Infantry).

On formation, the regiment had the following battalions:

- 1st Battalion (formerly 1st Battalion, 13th Foot)
- 2nd Battalion (formerly 2nd Battalion, 13th Foot)
- 3rd Battalion (formerly 1st Somerset Light Infantry Militia)
- 4th Battalion (formerly 2nd Somerset Light Infantry Militia)
- 1st Volunteer Battalion (formerly 1st Somersetshire Rifle Volunteer Corps)
- 2nd Volunteer Battalion (formerly 2nd Somersetshire Rifle Volunteer Corps)
- 3rd Volunteer Battalion (formerly 3rd Somersetshire Rifle Volunteer Corps)

The two regular battalions continued the system of alternating between home and foreign stations:

Locations of the regular battalions 1881–1914
1st Battalion	2nd Battalion
Ireland 1881–1886	India 1881–1884
Ireland 1881–1886	Burma 1884–1887
England 1886–1891	India 1887–1894
Gibraltar 1891–1893	India 1887–1894
India 1893–1908	England 1894–1895, Guernsey 1895–1897, England 1897–1899
India 1893–1908	South Africa 1899–1903
India 1893–1908	England 1903–1908
England 1908–1914	Malta 1908–1911
England 1908–1914	China 1911–1913
England 1908–1914	India 1913–1914

==== Actions in India and Burma ====
The 2nd Battalion took part in the Third Anglo-Burmese War of 1885 to 1887. Following an initial invasion, the battalion spent two years broken up into small groups pacifying the inhabitants of the country. While the unit lost only 17 men in combat, 150 were to die from disease. During its period in India, the 1st Battalion was mainly stationed in the North West Frontier Province, and took part in First Mohmand Campaign of 1897. The battalion was posted at Rawalpindi until late 1902 when it moved to Peshawar near the historic Khyber Pass on the border to Afghanistan.

==== Second Boer War ====
In October 1899, war broke out between British Empire and the Boer Republics of South Africa. The 2nd Battalion landed in the Cape in December 1899, and was part of the British forces defeated at the Battle of Spion Kop in January 1900. In February of the same year, the battalion helped to relieve the siege of Ladysmith. They spent the remainder of the conflict taking part in a number of minor actions.

The 4th (2nd Somerset Militia) Battalion was embodied in December 1899, and 415 officers and men embarked in the SS Kildonan Castle in early March 1900 for service in South Africa. A large contingent of the men returned home in May 1902 on the SS Sicilia.

==== Haldane reforms ====
The Boer War had severely stretched the resources of the British Army and had exposed the weakness of the militia and volunteers as an effective reserve force. In 1907–1908, Richard Haldane, Secretary of State for War reorganised these second-line units of the army as part of a larger series of reforms. The existing militia was reduced in size and redesignated as the "Special Reserve", while the Volunteer Force was merged with the Yeomanry to form a new Territorial Force, organised into 14 infantry divisions, liable for service in wartime.

In 1908, the Volunteers and Militia were reorganised nationally, with the former merging with the Yeomanry to become the Territorial Force and the latter the Special Reserve; the regiment now had one Reserve and two Territorial battalions.

==== First World War ====
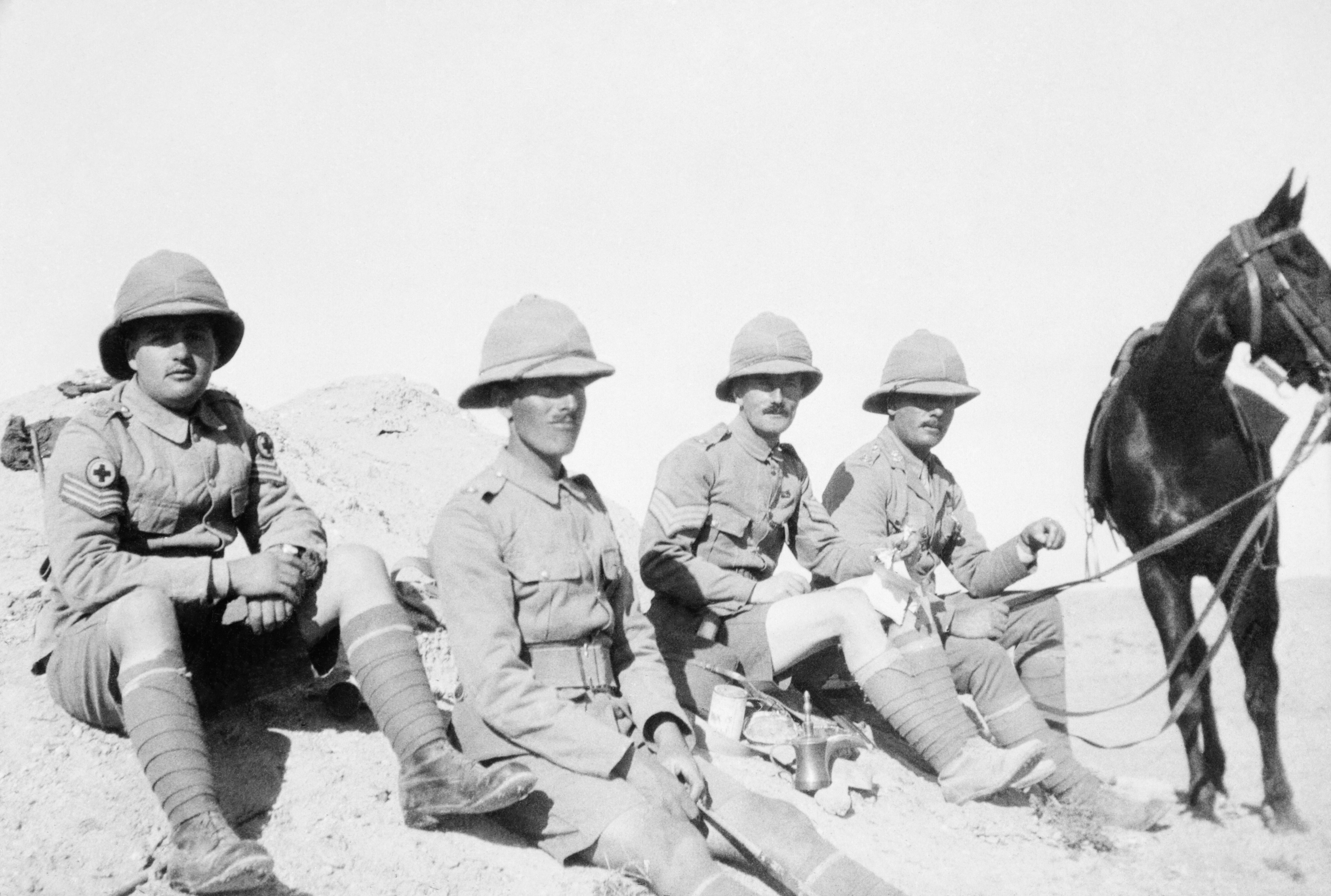
Non-commissioned officers of the 1/4th Battalion, Somerset Light Infantry in Mesopotamia, 1916.

The regiment's name was again changed to the Prince Albert's (Somerset Light Infantry) in 1912.

The Regiment saw active service in the First World War, with battalions involved on the Western Front, Mesopotamia (now Iraq) and Palestine. Altogether, 18 battalions existed during the war. One of the new battalions was formed by the conversion of the West Somerset Yeomanry, a Territorial Force Cavalry Regiment; the rest were formed by the duplication of the existing Territorial Force units or by the formation of new "service" battalions.

Battalions of the Somerset Light Infantry in the First World War
Battalion	Notes
1st Battalion	In England on outbreak of war, on Western Front from August 1914 (part of 4th Division)
2nd Battalion	In India on outbreak of war, and remained in the country (part of the 4th (Quetta) Division 1914–1917, 1st (Peshawar) Division 1917–1918).
3rd (Reserve) Battalion (SR)	Training unit through which recruits passed. Originally in Taunton, moved to Devonport in August 1914, to Derry in 1917 and Belfast in 1918.
1/4th Battalion (TF)	The original 4th Battalion, redesignated on the formation of duplicate 2/4th in September 1914. To India in November 1914 and Mesopotamia from 1916 (part of 3rd (Lahore) Division until September 1918, then 14th Indian Division)
2/4th Battalion (TF); 2/4th (Pioneer) Battalion	Duplicate of 4th Battalion, formed September 1914 as part of the 45th (2nd Wessex) Division. In India and the Andaman Islands from December 1914 – September 1917. To Egypt as part of the 75th Division September 1917, to France in January 1918. Converted to pioneer battalion, 34th Division June 1918.
3/4th Battalion (TF); 4th (Reserve) Battalion	Third-line duplicate of 4th Battalion, formed March 1915. Converted to reserve battalion in April 1916, remained in United Kingdom.
1/5th Battalion (TF)	The original 5th Battalion, redesignated on the formation of duplicate 2/5th in September 1914. To India in November 1914 and then Egypt as part of the 75th Division from May 1917.
2/5th Battalion (TF); 2/5th (Pioneer) Battalion	Duplicate of 5th Battalion, formed September 1914 as part of the 45th (2nd Wessex) Division. In India from December 1914 where they were attached to Burma Division.
3/5th Battalion (TF); 5th (Reserve) Battalion	Third-line duplicate of 5th Battalion, formed March 1915. Converted to reserve battalion in April 1916, remained in United Kingdom.
6th (Service) Battalion	Formed August 1914. To Western Front as part of 14th (Light) Division. Following heavy casualties they formed a composite unit with the 5th Battalion Oxfordshire and Buckinghamshire Light Infantry April 1918, returned to England for reconstruction and absorbed 13th Battalion Duke of Cornwall's Light Infantry, returned to France August 1918.
7th (Service) Battalion	Formed September 1914. To Western Front as part of 20th (Light) Division July 1915.
8th (Service) Battalion	Formed October 1914. To Western Front as part of 21st Division September 1915. Transferred to 37th Division July 1916.
9th (Service) Battalion; 9th (Reserve) Battalion	Formed October 1914 as part of 33rd Division. Converted to Reserve battalion April 1915, converted to 45th Training Reserve Battalion 1916. Remained in United Kingdom.
10th (Home Service) Battalion	Formed November 1916, disbanded November 1917
11th Battalion	Formed January 1917 by redesignation of 86th Provisional Battalion, TF. To France May 1918 as part of 59th (2nd North Midland) Division
12th (West Somerset Yeomanry) Battalion.	Formed January 1917 in Egypt by conversion of West Somerset Yeomanry. Part of 74th (Yeomanry) Division. To France May 1918.
13th (Home Service) Battalion	Formed April 1918 to replace 11th Battalion.
1st Garrison Battalion	Formed 1917. To India.

==== Inter-war period ====
Following the armistice ending the First World War, the war-raised battalions were rapidly disbanded. The regular battalions returned to the pre-war system of alternating home and foreign stations. The 1st Battalion was stationed in Northern Ireland and England, before being stationed in Egypt (1926–1928), Hong Kong (1928–1930) and India from 1930.

The 2nd Battalion, which had spent the entire war in India, fought in the brief Third Anglo-Afghan War in 1919, seeing active service in Afghanistan and on the North-West Frontier. Returning to India in 1920, the battalion moved to the Sudan in 1926 and England in 1927.

The Territorial Force was reorganised to become the Territorial Army in 1920, and the 4th and 5th Battalions were reconstituted. At the same time, the 3rd (Special Reserve) Battalion was placed in "suspended animation", and was never again embodied.

On 1 January 1921, the regimental title was changed a final time, becoming The Somerset Light Infantry (Prince Albert's).

=== Somerset Light Infantry (Prince Albert's) ===
==== Second World War ====
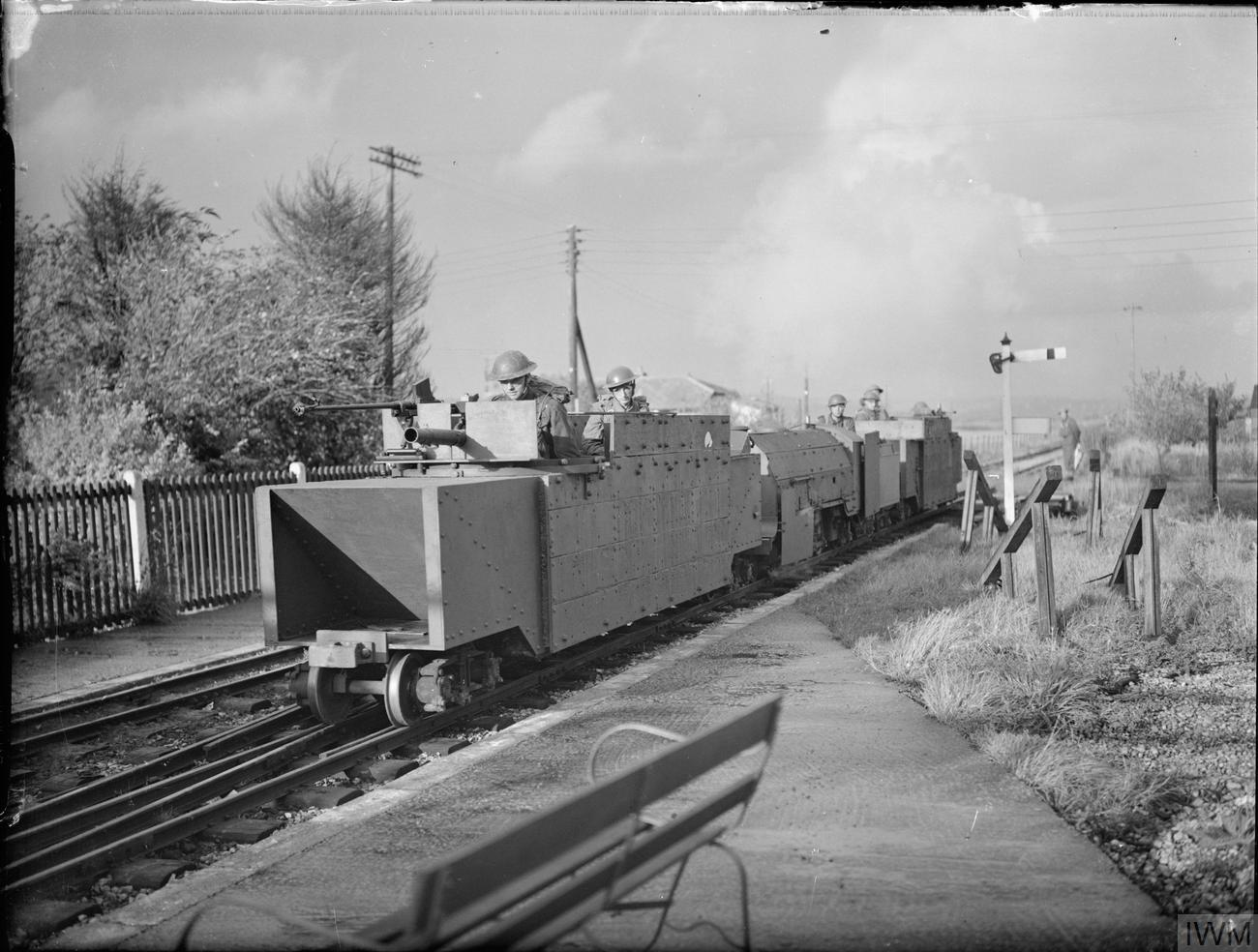
Men from the Somerset Light Infantry man an armoured train on the Romney, Hythe and Dymchurch miniature railway in Kent, 14 October 1940.

Altogether, the Somerset Light Infantry raised 11 battalions for service during the Second World War, six of which saw service overseas. In addition to the Regular Army 1st and 2nd battalions, the existing 4th and 5th Territorial Army battalions both formed 2nd Line duplicate units in 1939 prior to war being declared: the 6th and 7th battalions, both part of 45th (Wessex) Division on the outbreak of war. The 8th (Home Defence) Battalion, which was also formed in 1939, was renumbered as the 30th Battalion in 1941. The 9th, 10th, 11th (Holding) and 50th (Holding) Battalions were all formed in 1940, although the latter two had ceased to exist by the end of the year.

Battalions of the Somerset Light Infantry in the Second World War
Battalions	Notes
1st Battalion	On the outbreak of war, was stationed in British India, would remain in there for the remainder of the war (7th Indian Infantry Division).
2nd Battalion	In Gibraltar at the start of the war (2nd Gibraltar Brigade) and would later transfer with the rest of the brigade to the 4th Infantry Division.
4th (T.A.) Battalion	Was part of the 43rd (Wessex) Infantry Division prior to the war. The Battalion would see combat in Western Europe following D-day.
5th (T.A.) Battalion	Was transferred to the 45th Infantry Division in 1944.
6th (T.A.) Battalion	Duplicate of 4th Battalion, formed August 1939 as part of the 45th Infantry Division
7th (T.A.) Battalion	Duplicate of 7th Battalion, formed August 1939 as part of the 45th Infantry Division. It was later transfer to the 43rd (Wessex) Infantry Division in September 1943. The Battalion would see combat in Western Europe following D-day
8th (Home Defense) Battalion	Formed in 1939 from National Defense Companies, it would be renumbered 30th Battalion.
9th (Holding) Battalion	Formed in 1940 as part of the 45th Infantry Division. It was later transfer to the 43rd (Wessex) Infantry Division in September 1943.
10th (Holding) Battalion	Raised in 1940 and in 1942 was converted in to 7th (Light Infantry) Parachute Battalion. It would be part of the 6th Airborne Division and see combat in Western Europe.
11th (Holding) Battalion	Formed in 1940, disbanded in 1941 following end of a German invasion threat.
30th (Holding) Battalion	Renumbering of the 8th (Home Defense) Battalion, would be assigned to the 43rd Infantry Brigade where it would perform security duties in North African, and Italy.
50th (Holding) Battalion	Formed in 1940, disbanded in 1941 following end of a German invasion threat.

===== Regular Army =====
The 1st Battalion, Somerset Light Infantry, commanded by Lieutenant Colonel John Harding, was stationed in British India at the outbreak of war and would remain in the Far East throughout the conflict. The battalion fought in the Burma Campaign with the 114th Indian Infantry Brigade which was part of the 7th Indian Infantry Division, itself part of the British Fourteenth Army, led by Bill Slim. John Waddy served with the battalion in the early stages of the war.

The 2nd Battalion was serving with the 2nd Gibraltar Brigade as part of the garrison there, upon the outbreak of war in 1939. On 1 December 1943, the brigade was redesignated the 28th Infantry Brigade, which also included the 2nd King's Regiment (Liverpool) and 1st Argyll and Sutherland Highlanders (later 2/4th Royal Hampshire Regiment). On 24 December, the brigade became attached to the British 4th Infantry Division. The 2nd Somersets, with the rest of the division, arrived in Italy in March 1944 and served in the Italian Campaign as part of the British Eighth Army in many battles such as that of Monte Cassino, one of the worst battles of the Italian Campaign, in 1944, where they played an important role alongside 2nd King's and fought in Operation Diadem and on the Gothic Line from August–September 1944. In November, the 4th Division, with the rest of III Corps, was sent to Greece to help calm the Greek Civil War, which was caused after the German Army withdrew from the country.

===== Territorial Army =====
The regiment also had four Territorial battalions, although only two would serve overseas. Throughout the war, the 4th Battalion, Somerset Light Infantry served with the 129th Brigade, alongside the 4th and 5th Wiltshire Regiment, part of the 43rd (Wessex) Infantry Division, and spent most of its existence in the United Kingdom in Kent under XII Corps of Southern Command.

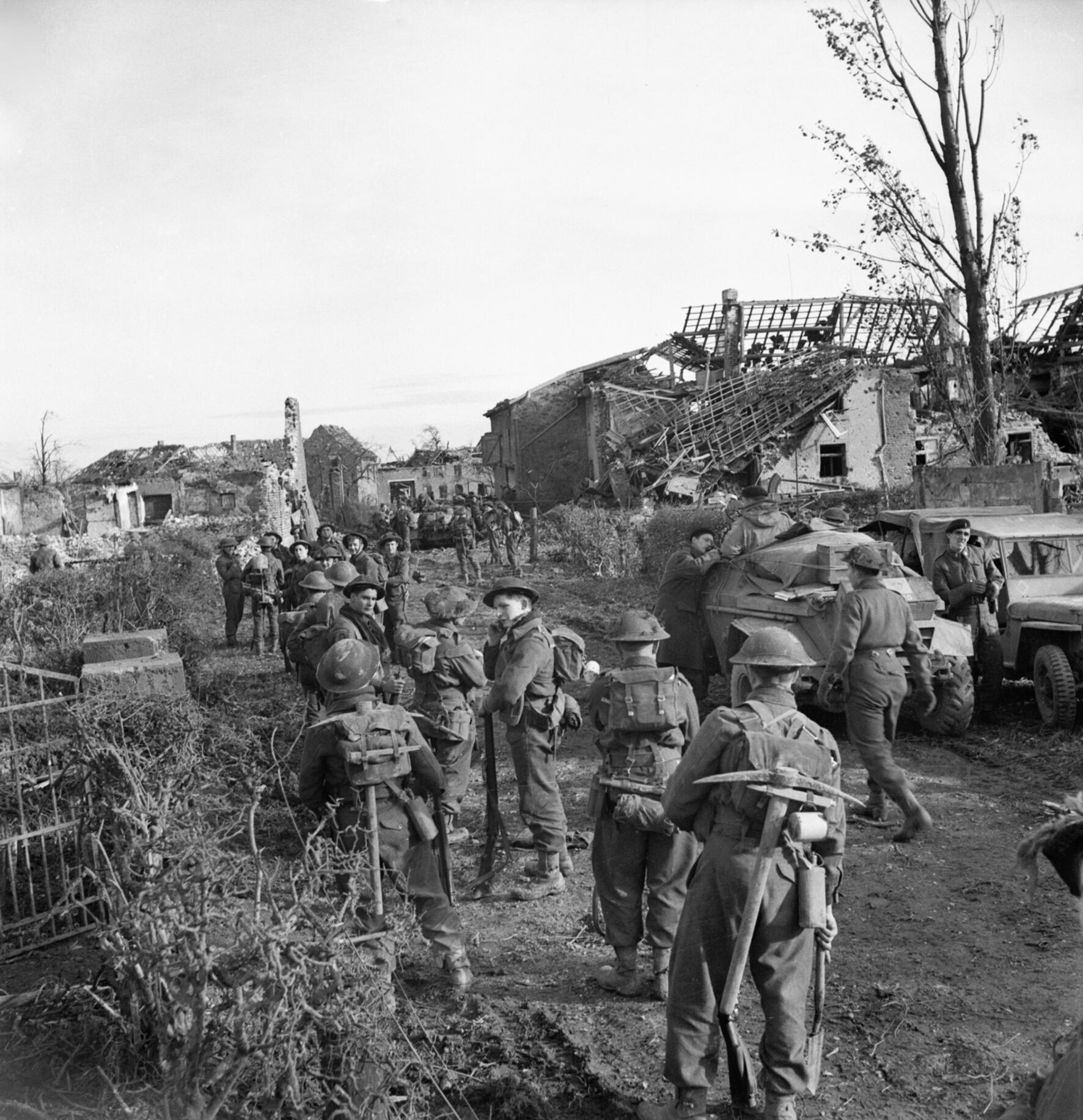
Men of the 7th Battalion, Somerset Light Infantry resting during the assault on Geilenkirchen in Germany, 18 November 1944.

The 7th Battalion, which had been created on 24 August 1939 as a 2nd Line duplicate of the 5th, was originally serving alongside both the 5th and 6th battalions in 135th Brigade, of the 45th Division. On 11 September 1942, the battalion was transferred to the 214th Infantry Brigade, which included the 5th Duke of Cornwall's Light Infantry and the 9th Somersets (later replaced by the 1st Worcestershire Regiment).

Both the 4th and 7th battalions served in the North West Europe Campaign after the Normandy landings on 6 June 1944, D-Day. The division fought very well in the Battle of Normandy, particularly so during the Battle for Caen in Operation Epsom in late June, at the Battle for Hill 112 (Operation Jupiter). During the battle, "the 4th Somersets suffered 556 casualties out of a strength of 845. Between 26 June and 14 July, 4th SLI received 19 reinforcement officers and 479 ORs as replacements." The battalion became involved in trench warfare similar to that of the Great War. They later played a large part in the disastrous Operation Market Garden, a small role in the Battle of the Bulge and finally took part in Operation Plunder, the crossing of the River Rhine by the Allies.

===== Hostilities-only =====
The other battalion to see active service was the 10th Battalion, raised in 1940, which was converted in 1942 into the 7th Parachute Battalion, and was now part of the Parachute Regiment, itself part of the British Army's airborne forces. They were assigned to the 3rd Parachute Brigade, which was originally part of the 1st Airborne Division, but were later assigned to the newly-raised 5th Parachute Brigade, part of the 6th Airborne Division, which had also just been raised. The 7th Parachute Battalion would see its first combat during Operation Tonga, the British airborne landings in Normandy, the night before 6 June 1944, D-Day. They would then go on to serve throughout the Battle of Normandy as normal infantrymen, The battalion then played a part in the Battle of the Bulge in December 1944 and then again in Operation Varsity in March 1945, the largest airborne drop of the war, including both the 6th Airborne and the US 17th Airborne Division, with well over 16,000 airborne troops being involved.

The SLI also had responsibility for defending local airfields, including RNAS Charlton Horethorne, where they prepared trenches, hardpoints and machine gun positions.

The 30th Battalion, of 43rd Infantry Brigade, formed part of the British First Army, and served in Tunisia and Italy.

==== Post war to amalgamation ====
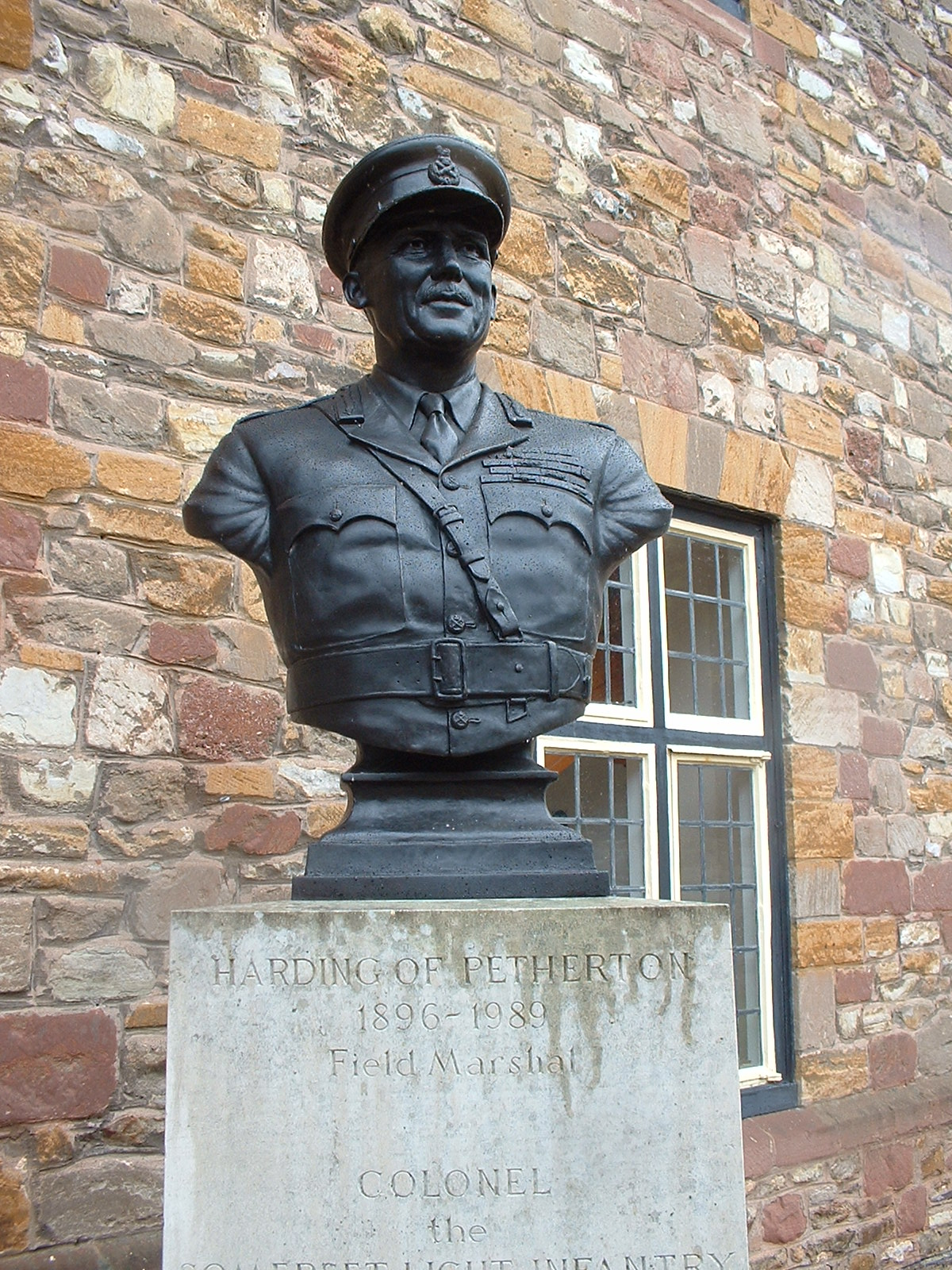
Allan Francis John Harding, 1st Baron Harding of Petherton. Colonel of the Somerset Light Infantry 1953–1959.

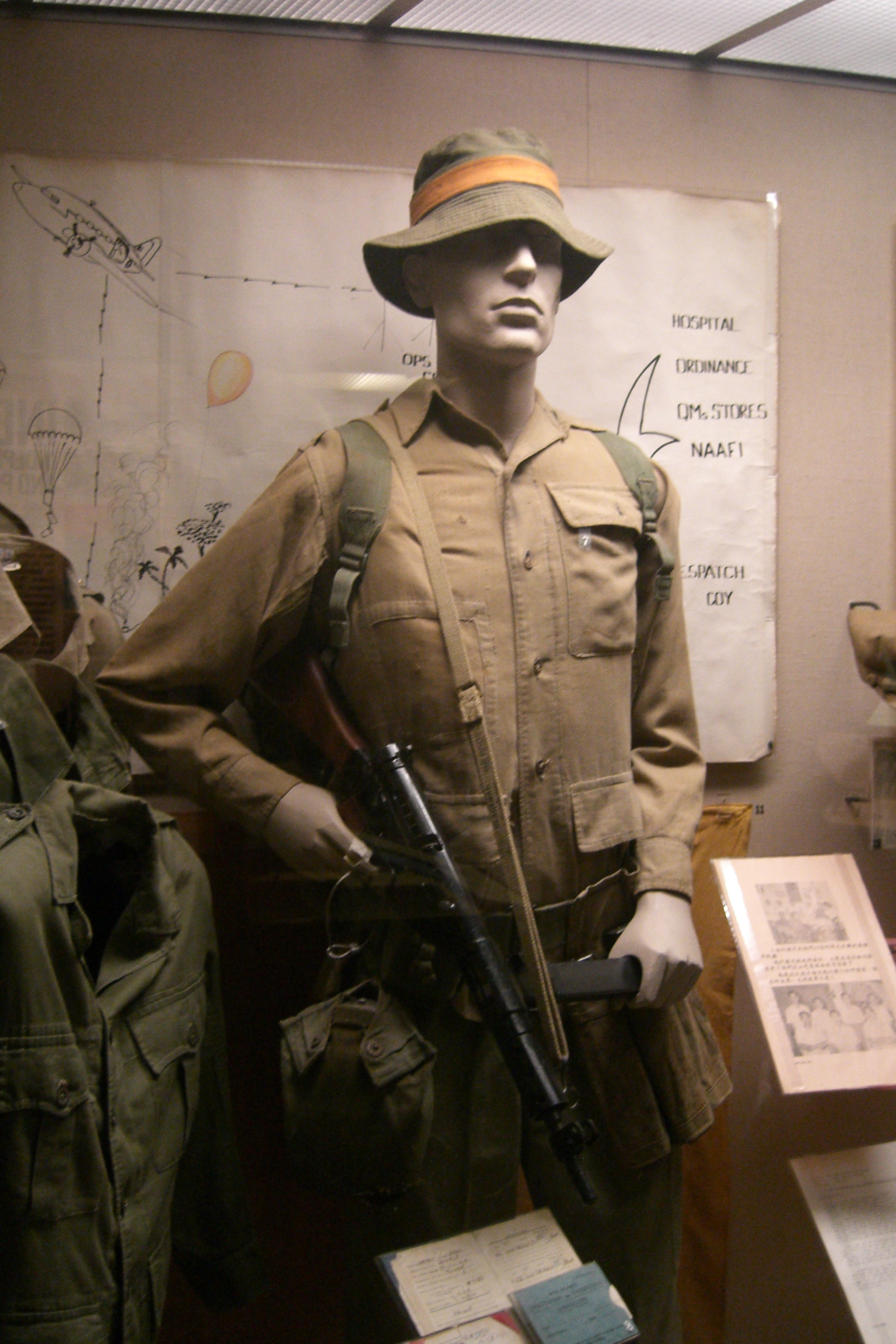
Lieutenant David McMurtrie's jungle service dress of the 1st Battalion Somerset Light Infantry used in the Malayan Emergency.

The 1st Battalion was the last British infantry battalion to leave India after its independence, departing on 28 February 1948. During the final ceremony, the battalion marched through Bombay (now Mumbai) and received a guard of honour from the newly formed Indian Army at the Gateway of India. The 2nd Battalion ended the war in Greece, subsequently forming part of the Allied occupation force of Austria. The two regular battalions returned to the United Kingdom where they were amalgamated into a single 1st Battalion on 28 June 1948 - this was part of a general reduction in the size of the infantry following Indian independence.

The reconstituted 1st Battalion was stationed in Germany as part of the British Army of the Rhine from 1951–1953. From 1952–1955, it formed part of the British forces fighting in the Malayan Emergency, where it took part in jungle warfare. In its final years, the battalion was involved in a number of conflicts: the anti-tank platoon formed part of the Anglo-French force that intervened in the Suez Crisis of 1956. The majority of the battalion was in Cyprus, where a nationalist uprising against British rule had broken out. In 1957, they returned to Germany.

In 1947, the Territorial Army was reconstituted and the 4th and 6th Battalion were reformed as infantry battalions; the 5th Battalion was reformed as a unit of the Royal Artillery. Three years later, the 4th Battalion absorbed the two other units.

=== Amalgamation ===
The regiment amalgamated with the Duke of Cornwall's Light Infantry in 1959 to form the Somerset and Cornwall Light Infantry. This, in turn, amalgamated with the three other regiments of the Light Infantry Brigade to form The Light Infantry in 1968.

== Regimental museum ==
The Somerset Military Museum is based at Taunton Castle.

== Battle honours ==
The regiment was awarded the following battle honours for display on the colours:

Displayed on the regimental colours

- Gibraltar 1704–5
- Dettingen
- Martinique 1809
- Ava
- Ghuznee 1839
- Affghanistan 1839 (sic)
- Cabool 1842
- Sevastopol
- South Africa 1878–9
- Burma 1885–87
- Relief of Ladysmith
- South Africa 1899–1902
- Afghanistan 1919
- The sphinx superscribed "Egypt"
- A mural crown superscribed "Jellalabad"

First World War
Battle honours in bold were selected for display on the King's/Queen's Colours.

- Le Cateau
- Retreat from Mons
- **Marne 1914 '18**
- **Aisne 1914**
- Armentières 1914
- **Ypres 1915 '17 '18**
- St. Julien
- Frezenberg
- Bellewaarde
- **Hooge 1915**
- Loos
- Mount Sorrel
- **Somme 1916 '18**
- **Albert 1916 '18**
- Delville Wood
- Guillemont
- Flers-Courcelette
- Morval
- Le Transloy
- Ancre 1916 '18
- **Arras 1917 '18**
- Vimy 1917
- Scarpe 1917 '18
- Arleux
- Langemarck 1917
- Menin Road
- Polygon Wood
- Broodseinde
- Poelcappelle
- Passchendaele
- **Cambrai 1917 '18**
- St. Quentin
- Bapaume 1918
- Rosières
- Avre
- Lys
- Hazebrouck
- Béthune
- Soissonais-Ourq
- Drocourt-Quéant
- Hindenburg Line
- Havrincourt
- Épehy
- Canal du Nord
- Courtrai
- Selle
- Valenciennes
- Sambre
- France and Flanders 1914–18
- Gaza
- El Mughar
- Nebi Samwil
- Jerusalem
- Megiddo
- Sharon
- **Palestine 1917 '18**
- **Tigris 1916**
- Sharqat
- Mesopotamia 1916–18
- N.W. Frontier India 1915

Second World War
Battle honours in bold were selected for display on the King's/Queen's Colours.

- Odon
- Caen
- **Hill 112**
- **Mont Pincon**
- Noireau Crossing
- Seine 1944
- Nederrijn
- Geilenkirchen
- Roer
- **Rhineland**
- Cleve
- Goch
- Hochwald
- Xanten
- **Rhine**
- Bremen
- **North-West Europe 1944–45**
- **Cassino II**
- Trasimene Line
- Arezzo
- Advance to Florence
- Capture of Forli
- **Cosina Canal Crossing**
- **Italy 1944–45**
- Athens
- Greece 1944–45
- **North Arakan**
- Buthidaung
- **Ngakyedauk Pass**
- Burma 1943–44

== Colonels ==
The colonels of the regiment were as follows:

=== Earl of Huntingdon's Regiment of Foot ===
- 1685–1688: Col Theophilus Hastings, 7th Earl of Huntingdon
- 1688–1695: Col Ferdinando Hastings
- 1695–1702: Col Sir John Jacob
- 1702–1715: Lt-Gen James Barry, 4th Earl of Barrymore
- 1715–1725: Col Stanhope Cotton
- 1725–1732: Gen Lord Mark Kerr
- 1732–1739: Brig-Gen John Middleton
- 1739–1766: Gen Hon Harry Pulteney

=== 13th Regiment of Foot ===
- 1766–1767: F.M. HRH William Henry, 1st Duke of Gloucester
- 1767–1789: Gen Hon James Murray

=== The 13th (1st Somersetshire) Regiment of Foot ===
- 1789–1804: Gen George Ainslie
- 1804–1813: Gen Alexander Campbell
- 1813–1843: Gen Edward Morrison

=== The 13th (1st Somersetshire) Prince Albert's Light Infantry ===
- 1843–1846: Major-Gen Sir Robert Henry Sale GCB
- 1846–1863: F.M. Sir William Maynard Gomm GCB
- 1863–1864: Major-Gen Philip McPherson
- 1864–1880: Gen Philip Spencer Stanhope

=== The Somerset Light Infantry (Prince Albert's) ===
- 1880–1900: Gen Lord Mark Ralph George Kerr GCB
- 1900–1901: Lt-Gen Sir John William Cox KCB
- 1901–1910: Major-Gen Edward Lutwyche England CB
- 1910–1914: Major-Gen Sir Henry Hallam Parr KCB CMG
- 1914–1919: Major-Gen Richard Lloyd Payne CB DSO
- 1919–1929: Lt-Gen Sir Thomas D'Oyly Snow KCB KCMG
- 1929–1938: Gen Sir Walter Pipon Braithwaite GCB
- 1938–1947: Major-Gen Vivian Henry Bruce Majendie CB DSO
- 1947–1953: Lt-Gen Sir John George des Reaux Swayne KCB CBE
- 1953–1959: F.M. John Harding, 1st Baron Harding of Petherton GCB CBE DSO MC

== Victoria Cross recipients ==
- Lieutenant George Albert Cairns
- Private Patrick Carlin
- Major William Knox Leet
- Sergeant William Napier
- Private Thomas Henry Sage

== Dress and insignia ==
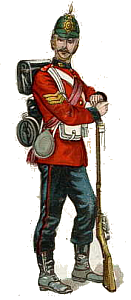
Sergeant of the regiment in 1898. Distinctive items of dress include the dark green helmet and sash tied over the left shoulder

=== Facings ===
From its establishment in 1685, the regiment had a red coat with yellow facings. This was originally the colour of the cloth lining of the coat, which appeared in the turned back cuffs, skirts and lapels. Later, as uniform styles changed, it became the colour of the collar and cuffs of the jacket or tunic. A royal warrant of 1751 first regulated the facing colours of the "Marching Regiments of Foot". Those of the 13th Foot, or Lieutenant-General Pulteney's Regiment, was given as "philemot" yellow, a description repeated in the next clothing regulation of 1768. "Philemot" was a corruption of the French feuille morte or "dead leaf", a shade of yellow approximating to that of a faded (Autumn) leaf. When the 13th Foot was given the title "Prince Albert's" in 1842, it became a "royal" regiment, and the facings were changed to dark blue. The braid and lace worn on officers' coats was silver until 1830 and thereafter gold. It had a black line threaded through it.

=== Sergeants' sash ===
A distinction unique to the regiment was that the warrant officers and sergeants wore their sashes over the left shoulder and tied on the right side, in the same manner as officers. This commemorated the regiment's stand at Culloden, where the large number of officer casualties led to the sergeants taking command. This was authorised in 1865, although appears to have been worn earlier without authority; the origin is disputed, since the regiment did not report any casualties as a result of Culloden. In 1898, officers of all regiments were ordered to wear the sash knotted on the left side, with the exception of the Somerset Light Infantry who were permitted to continue with the knot on the right.

=== Light infantry distinctions ===
In 1822, the regiment was granted light infantry distinctions, which survived in the scarlet full dress of 1914 as a dark green home service helmet (instead of the dark blue of line infantry) and a bugle-horn incorporated in the badge. The forage cap and postwar No.1 dress tunic worn by the regiment from 1947 were also dark green, while trousers remained dark blue with green piping.

=== Badges ===
The first distinctive badge awarded to the regiment was the sphinx for service in Egypt, authorised in 1802. From 1814, a stringed bugle-horn had been the approved badge of light infantry and rifle regiments. When the 13th Foot were converted to light infantry in 1822, the badge adopted for the shako head-dress was a "bugle-horn with strings with the numerals 13 in the centre and surmounted by the Sphinx". When a new model of shako was adopted in 1844, a mural crown and scroll inscribed "Jellalabad" were added. Similar devices were used on the plate of the home service helmet adopted in 1878. In 1898, when khaki service dress was introduced, a metal badge was designed for the new slouch hat. This consisted of a bugle surmounted by a mural crown above which was a scroll inscribed "Jellalabad". The cypher "PA" for Prince Albert was placed within the strings of the bugle horn. This remained the regiment's cap badge on various forms of head-dress until amalgamation.

== Bibliography ==
- Cannon, Richard (1848). Historical record of the Thirteenth, First Somerset or The Prince Albert's Regiment of Light Infantry; Containing an account of the formation of the regiment in 1685 and of its subsequent services to 1848. Parker, Furnivall and Park.
- Carter, Thomas (1867). Historical Record of the Thirteenth, First Somersetshire, or Prince Albert's Regiment of Light Infantry. London: W. O. Mitchell.
- Delaforce, Patrick (2012). The Fighting Wessex Wyverns: From Normandy to Bremerhaven with the 43rd Wessex Division. Fonthill Media. ISBN 978-1781550717.
- Joslen, Lt-Col H. F. (1960). Orders of Battle, United Kingdom and Colonial Formations and Units in the Second World War, 1939–1945. London: HM Stationery Office. ISBN 1843424746.
- Mackie, John H. F. (2002). Answering the Call: Letters from the Somerset Light Infantry 1914-1919. Raby. ISBN 1-84410-005-7.
- Mills, C. P. (1988). A Strange War. Gloucester: Alan Sutton. ISBN 0-86299-377-6.
- Popham, Hugh (1968). The Somerset Light Infantry. London: Hamish Hamilton. as part of the Famous Regiments series.
- Taylor, Arthur (1972). Discovering Military Traditions. Aylesbury: Shire Publications Ltd. ISBN 0-85-263171-5.
