= David de Barry, 5th Viscount Buttevant =

Irish viscount (1550–1617)

David de Barry
- Viscount Buttevant
- Tenure: 1581–1617
- Predecessor: James, 4th Viscount Buttevant
- Successor: David, 1st Earl of Barrymore
- Born: 1550
- Died: 10 April 1617 (aged 66–67)
- Spouses: 1. Ellen Roche; 2. Julia MacCarthy
- Issue Detail: David & others
- Father: James, 4th Viscount Buttevant
- Mother: Ellen MacCarthy Reagh

David Fitz-James de Barry, 18th Baron Barry, 5th Viscount Buttevant (1550–1617), sided initially with fitz Maurice, the rebel, in the 1st Desmond rebellion but changed sides and fought against the rebels. He also fought for the crown in the Nine Years' War.

== Birth and origins ==
David, born 1550, was the second son of James de Barry and Ellen MacCarthy Reagh. His father was the 4th Viscount Buttevant. His father's family was Old English and owned much land in southern County Cork.

His mother was an illegitimate daughter of Cormac na Haoine MacCarthy Reagh, 10th Prince of Carbery. Her family were the MacCarthy Reagh, a Gaelic Irish dynasty that branched from the MacCarthy-Mor line with Donal Gott MacCarthy, a medieval King of Desmond, whose sixth son Donal Maol MacCarthy Reagh was the first independent ruler of Carbery.

David had four brothers and five sisters, which are (as far as known) listed in his father's article. David was the de facto 5th viscount as his elder brother Richard, the de jure 5th viscount, was deaf and dumb and was passed over in the succession.

Family tree

David fitz James de Barry with his two wives, his parents, and other selected relatives. (Note: This family tree is partly derived from the Barry pedigree in Cokayne. Also see the list of children in the text.)

James; 4th Viscount; Buttevant d. 1581	Ellen; MacCarthy; Reagh
Ellen; Roche	David Barry; 5th Viscount; 1550–1617	Julia; MacCarthy
David; Barry d. 1604 d.v.p.*	Elizabeth; Power
David; 1st Earl; Barrimore; 1605–1642	Alice; Boyle

Legend

XXX	Subject of the article	XXX	Viscounts Buttevant; Earls of Barrymore

*d.v.p. = predeceased his father (decessit vita patris)

== First marriage and children ==
Barry married firstly Ellen Roche, daughter of David Roche, 5th Viscount Roche of Fermoy by his wife Ellen Butler, daughter of James Butler, 10th Baron Dunboyne.

David and Ellen had a son:

1. David (died c. 1604), married Elizabeth Power, daughter of Richard, 4th Baron le Power and Corroghmore; He died predeceasing his father; but had a posthumous son, who became David Barry, 1st Earl of Barrymore

—and six daughters:

1. Honora, married (1) Gerald FitzGerald of the Decies as his m2nd wife; (2) Patrick Browne
2. Helen, married (1) John "Oge" Power; (2) in 1601, Thomas Butler, 10th Earl of Ormonde; (3) in 1631, Thomas Somerset, 1st Viscount Somerset
3. a daughter whose name is not known who married James Tobin of Kumpshinagh
4. Ellen, married John Fitzgerald of Ballymaloe
5. Catherine, married Richard Burke, Esq.
6. Margaret, married (1) Sir Dermot O'Shaughnessy; and (2) Robert Dillon, 2nd Earl of Roscommon

== First Desmond Rebellion ==
At the outbreak of the First Desmond Rebellion in 1569, his father, the 4th Viscount Buttevant, supported the rebels. This rebellion ended when Fitz Maurice, the rebel leader, submitted to John Perrot, Lord President of Munster, at Kilmallock in 1573.

== Viscount and second marriage ==
Barry succeeded his father in 1581.

Buttevant, as he was now, married secondly, Julia MacCarthy (also called Sheelagh), daughter of Cormac MacDermot MacCarthy, 16th Lord of Muskerry by his wife Mary Butler.

David and Julia had three sons and four daughters but nothing more seems to be known about them, not even their names.

== Irish wars ==
In the subsequent confiscations of his estates, the friary in Buttevant, together with its glebe, passed into the hands of the poet, Edmund Spenser.

Buttevant was noted for his long and bitter feud with Sir Florence MacCarthy, the MacCarthy Mór, whose loyalty to the Crown was always suspect. Buttevant did great damage to his reputation by spreading rumours about MacCarthy's alleged acts of treason, in particular his links with Patrick O'Collun, whom Florence MacCarthy had once employed as a fencing master. In 1594 O'Collun was executed for conspiracy to kill Queen Elizabeth I. As a result, MacCarthy spent much of his later life in custody.

In 1601, during the Nine Years War Buttevant sided with the new President of Munster, Sir George Carew. In the wake of the Battle of Kinsale, he was granted large estates in Munster which had been forfeited by the MacCarthy Reagh.

== Death ==
Buttevant died at Barryscourt Castle 10 April 1617. His title and estate passed to his grandson, who became 1st Earl of Barrymore in 1628.

== Notes and references ==
=== Sources ===
- Austin, Preston Bruce (1885). "Barry, David FitzJame, Viscount Buttevant (1655–1617)". In Lee, Sidney (ed.). Dictionary of National Biography. Vol. III. New York: MacMillan and Co. pp. 313–314. OCLC 8544105.
- Barry, E. (1902). Barrymore: Records of the Barrys of County Cork. Cork: Guy and Co.
- Barry, Judy (October 2009). McGuire, James; Quinn, James (eds.). "Barry, David Fitz-James". Dictionary of Irish Biography.
- Burke, Bernard (1866). A Genealogical History of the Dormant, Abeyant, Forfeited and Extinct Peerages of the British Empire (New ed.). London: Harrison. OCLC 11501348.
- Cokayne, George Edward (1910). Gibbs, Vicary (ed.). The complete peerage of England, Scotland, Ireland, Great Britain and the United Kingdom, extant, extinct, or dormant. Vol. I (2nd ed.). London: St Catherine Press. OCLC 228661424. – Ab-Adam to Basing (for Barry)
- Edwards, David (2004). "Butler, Thomas, tenth earl of Ormond and third earl of Ossory (1531–1558)". In Matthew, Henry Colin Gray; Harrison, Brian (eds.). Oxford Dictionary of National Biography. Vol. 9. New York: Oxford University Press. pp. 220–225. ISBN 0-19-861359-8.
- Gibson, Charles Bernard (1861). The History of the County and City of Cork. Vol. I. London: Thomas C. Newby. OCLC 1046580159. – to 1603
- Lodge, John (1789). Archdall, Mervyn (ed.). The Peerage of Ireland or, A Genealogical History of the Present Nobility of that Kingdom. Vol. I. Dublin: James Moore. OCLC 264906028. – Blood royal, dukes, earls
- McCormack, Anthony M. (October 2009). McGuire, James; Quinn, James (eds.). "FitzGerald, James fitz Maurice". Dictionary of Irish Biography.
- McGurk, J. J. N. (2004). "Barry, David fitz James, de facto third Viscount Buttevant (1550–1617)". In Matthew, Henry Colin Gray; Harrison, Brian (eds.). Oxford Dictionary of National Biography. Vol. 4. New York: Oxford University Press. p. 121. ISBN 0-19-861354-7.
- O'Hart, John (1892). Irish Pedigrees: Or, the Origin and Stem of the Irish Nation. Vol. I (5th ed.). Dublin: James Duffy & Co. OCLC 7239210. – Irish stem

Peerage of Ireland
Preceded by James de Barry	Viscount Buttevant; 1581–1617	Succeeded by David Barry
