= Earl of Barrymore =

Title in the Peerage of Ireland

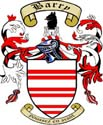
Arms of Barry: Argent, three bars gemelles gules; crest: Out of a castle argent a wolf's head sable

Earl of Barrymore was a title in the Peerage of Ireland. It was created for David Barry, 6th Viscount Buttevant, in 1627/28. Lord Barrymore held the subsidiary titles of Baron Barry (created c. 1261) and Viscount Buttevant (created 1541) in the County of Cork in Ireland. After the death of the 8th Earl in 1823, all these titles became extinct.

The Barrymore title was revived in 1902 in favour of Sir Arthur Smith-Barry, who was created Baron Barrymore in the Peerage of the United Kingdom. He was the grandson of John Smith Barry, an illegitimate son of James Hugh Smith Barry (died 1837), son of The Hon. John Smith Barry, younger son of The 4th Earl of Barrymore.

== Barons Barry (c. 1261) ==
- David de Barry, 1st Baron Barry (died 1278). In 1267, King Henry III of England appointed Lord David de Barry as Chief Justice of Ireland.
- John Barry, 2nd Baron Barry (died 1285)
- David FitzDavid Barry, 3rd Baron Barry (died 1290)
- John Barry, 4th Baron Barry (died 1330)
- David Barry, 5th Baron Barry (died 1347)
- David Barry, 6th Baron Barry (died 1392)
- John Barry, 7th Baron Barry (died 1420)
- William Barry, 8th Baron Barry (died 1480)
- John Barry, 9th Baron Barry (died 1486)
- Thomas de Barry, 10th Baron Barry (died 1488)
- William Barry, 11th Baron Barry (died 1500)
- John Barry, 12th Baron Barry (died 1530)
- John Barry, 13th Baron Barry (died 1534)
- John FitzJohn Barry, 14th Baron Barry (1517–1553) (created Viscount Buttevant in 1541)

== Viscounts Buttevant (1541) ==
- John FitzJohn Barry, 1st Viscount Buttevant (1517–1553)
- Edmund FitzJohn Barry, 2nd Viscount Buttevant (died 1556)
- James FitzJohn Barry, 3rd Viscount Buttevant (died 1557)
- James de Barry, 4th Viscount Buttevant (c. 1520–1581)
- David de Barry, 5th Viscount Buttevant (died 1617)
- David Barry, 6th Viscount Buttevant (1604–1642) (created Earl of Barrymore in 1627/28)

== Earls of Barrymore (1627/28) ==
- David Barry, 1st Earl of Barrymore (1604–1642)
- Richard Barry, 2nd Earl of Barrymore (1630–1694)
- Laurence Barry, 3rd Earl of Barrymore (1664–1699)
- James Barry, 4th Earl of Barrymore (1667–1747)
- James Barry, 5th Earl of Barrymore (1717–1751)
- Richard Barry, 6th Earl of Barrymore (1745–1773)
- Richard Barry, 7th Earl of Barrymore (1769–1793)
- Henry Barry, 8th Earl of Barrymore (1770–1823)

== See also ==
- De Barry family
- Arthur Smith-Barry, 1st Baron Barrymore of the second creation
