= David Barry, 1st Earl of Barrymore =

Protestant Irish noble (1605–1642)

David Barry
- Earl of Barrymore
- Tenure: 1628–1642
- Successor: Richard, 2nd Earl of Barrymore
- Born: 10 March 1605
- Died: 29 September 1642 (aged 37)
- Buried: Youghal
- Spouse: Alice Boyle
- Issue Detail: Richard & others
- Father: David de Barry
- Mother: Elizabeth Power

David Barry, 1st Earl of Barrymore (1605–1642), 6th Viscount Buttevant from 1617 to 1628, was a Protestant native Irish peer. He died of wounds received at the Battle of Liscarroll in September 1642.

== Birth and origins ==
Family tree

David Barry with wife, parents, and other selected relatives. (Note: This family tree is partly derived from the Barry pedigree in Cokayne. Also see the list of children in the text.)

Ellen; Roche	David Barry; 5th Viscount; 1550–1617	Julia; MacCarthy
David; Barry d. 1604 d.v.p.*	Elizabeth; Power
David; 1st Earl; Barrimore; 1605–1642	Alice; Boyle
Martha; Lawrence	Richard; 2nd Earl; 1630–1694	Dorothy; Ferrar
Laurence; 3rd Earl; 1664–1699	Martha; Lawrence	James; 4th Earl; 1667–1748	Elizabeth; Savage

Legend

XXX	Subject of the article	XXX	Viscounts Buttevant; Earls of Barrymore

*d.v.p. = predeceased his father (decessit vita patris)

David was born on 10 March 1605, probably at Buttevant, County Cork, a posthumous child of David de Barry and his wife Elizabeth Power. His father was an heir apparent who never acceded. David's grandfather was David de Barry, 5th Viscount Buttevant. The Barrys were an Old English family who had come from Wales at the time of the Anglo-Norman invasion of Ireland.

His mother was a daughter of Richard Power, 4th Baron le Power and Curraghmore.

== Early life and marriage ==
He succeeded as 6th Viscount Buttevant on 10 April 1617 on the death of his grandfather. Through Cork's influence, he was created Earl of Barrymore on 28 February 1628

== Marriage and children ==
In 1631 Buttevant, as he was now, married Alice Boyle, daughter of Richard Boyle, 1st Earl of Cork, by his second wife, Catherine Fenton.

== Irish wars ==
During the 1641 rebellion, he quite naturally sided with the Crown upon whom his title and lands depended. When the rebellion spread into Munster, he fought vigorously against the insurgents. On 10 May 1642, he stormed the Castle of Ballymacpatrick (now Careysville), near Fermoy, which was held by his grand-aunt, and hanged forty of the rebel leaders before breakfast. On 16 May, he lost Barrymore Castle at Castlelyons, his seat, to Maurice Roche, Viscount Fermoy and Donough MacCarty, 2nd Viscount Muskerry.

He led a regiment at the Battle of Liscarroll in September 1642. He died two weeks later on 29 September 1642 at his house in Castle Lyons probably of wounds received at the battle.

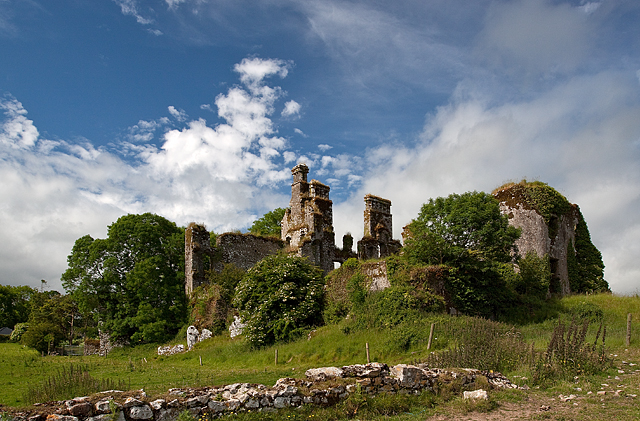
Barrymore Castle at Castlelyons

== Notes and references ==
=== Sources ===
- Armstrong, Robert (October 2009). McGuire, James; Quinn, James (eds.). "Barry, David Fitz-David". Dictionary of Irish Biography.
- Barry, Rev. E. (1902). Barrymore: Records of the Barrys of County Cork. Cork: Guy and Co.
- Cokayne, George Edward (1910). Gibbs, Vicary (ed.). The complete peerage of England, Scotland, Ireland, Great Britain and the United Kingdom, extant, extinct, or dormant. Vol. I (2nd ed.). London: St Catherine Press. OCLC 228661424. – Ab-Adam to Basing (for Barrymore)
- Harrison, Robert (1885). "Barry, David Fitz-David, first Earl of Barrymore (1605–1642)". In Lee, Sidney (ed.). Dictionary of National Biography. Vol. III. New York: MacMillan and Co. p. 313. OCLC 8544105.
- Harrison, Robert; Barry, Judith Hudson (2004). "Barry, David fitz David, first earl Barrymore (1605–1642)". In Matthew, Henry Colin Gray; Harrison, Brian (eds.). Oxford Dictionary of National Biography. Vol. 4. New York: Oxford University Press. pp. 120–121. ISBN 0-19-861354-7.
- Ohlmeyer, Jane H. (2004). "MacCarthy, Donough, first earl of Clancarty (1594–1665)". In Matthew, Colin; Harrison, Brian (eds.). Oxford Dictionary of National Biography. Vol. 35. New York: Oxford University Press. pp. 107–108. ISBN 0-19-861385-7.

Peerage of Ireland
New creation	Earl of Barrymore; 1628–1642	Succeeded by Richard Barry
Preceded by David de Barry	Viscount Buttevant; 1617–1642	Succeeded by Richard Barry
