= Richard Barry, 2nd Earl of Barrymore =

Richard Barry, 2nd Earl of Barrymore, 7th Viscount Buttevant, 20th Baron Barry (4 November 1630 – 1694) was the son of David Barry, 1st Earl of Barrymore and Lady Alice Boyle.

He was married first to Susan Killegrew, daughter of Sir William Killegrew, they had three children: Mary, Catherine, and Susan. Secondly, he married Martha Lawrence, daughter of Henry Lawrence and Amy Peyton, which produced Laurence Barry, 3rd Earl of Barrymore and Theodora. He married a third time to Dorothy Ferrar, daughter of John Ferrar of Dromore and his wife Dorothy Waldron, widow of the eminent judge Sir William Ryves, in February 1666. From this marriage, seven children were born including the firstborn James Barry, 4th Earl of Barrymore.

Peerage of Ireland
Preceded by David Barry	Earl of Barrymore; 1642–1694	Succeeded by Laurence Barry
