= Megiddo (battle honour) =

Megiddo is a battle honour awarded to units of the British Army, Royal Air Force and British Empire forces which successfully participated in the Battle of Megiddo in 1918 during the Palestine Campaign of the First World War.

Sharon and Nablus are subsidiary battle honours awarded for this campaign to units which participated in these actions.

== See also ==
- List of World War I battles
- Battle honours of the British and Imperial Armies
