= Buttevant Franciscan Friary =

13th-century Franciscan friary in County Cork, Ireland

Coordinates: 52°13′53″N 8°40′09″W

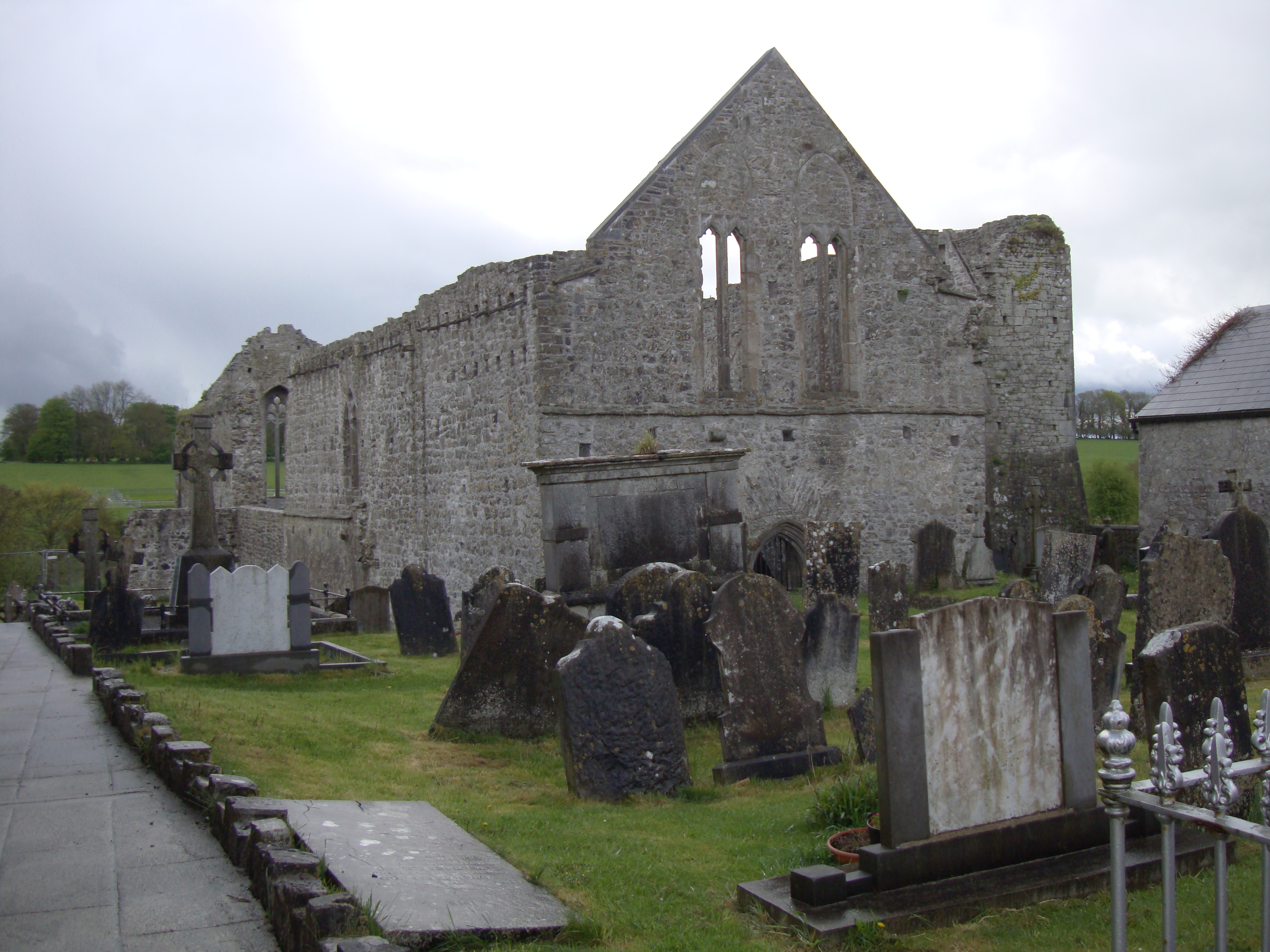

- Location within Ireland

Monastery information
- Order: Franciscans
- Established: c.1251

People
- Founder: David Óg Barry

Architecture
- Status: Inactive

Site
- Location: Buttevant, County Cork, Ireland
- Public access: Yes

Buttevant Friary, Smith's History of Cork, 1750. The tower fell in 1814.

Buttevant Friary Interior, Smith's History of Cork, 1750

The Buttevant Franciscan Friary is a ruined 13th-century Franciscan friary situated in the middle of the town of Buttevant, County Cork, Ireland. The Augustinian friary in nearby Ballybeg is often confused with the Buttevant Franciscan Friary in historical documents.

== History ==
The friary was founded circa. 1251, by David Óg Barry. It is dedicated to St Thomas Becket.

By 1324 Buttevant friary consisted of a community of Irish and Anglo-Norman friars and was sufficiently important to maintain its own studium, or house of studies. Racial tensions, however, troubled the community. In 1327 a commission established by Pope John XXII in 1317 to investigate the Irish Province of the Order determined the transfer of the Gaelic lector from Buttevant to one of its Gaelic friaries. In 1325, the general chapter of the Order, held at Lyons, was informed that the obedience of the friary of St. Thomas at Buttevant had been transferred to the recently erected custody of Cork, thereby taking the house out of Irish control and subjecting it to that of the Anglo-Norman custody of Cork.

In the medieval burgage of Buttevant, the friary porch was the place to make legal agreements, renew or grant leases on Lady Day and Michelmas, swear fealty, do homage and contract marriage.

At the time of its dissolution, c. 1540, the examining jurors certified that the friary at Buttevant consisted of the friary church and conventual buildings with no surplus appurtenances; a garden and cemetery containing an acre and a half of ground worth 6 shillings and 8 pence; and a watermill worth 30 shillings, bringing the total extent of its property to 36 shillings and 8 pence.

In 1570, James de Barry, 4th Viscount Buttevant, received a lease, to hold for twenty-one years, of "the site of the house of the friars at Killnamullagh, alias Buttevante, Co. Cork, with its appurtenances at an annual rent of 16 shillings and 8 pence". At the outbreak of the Desmond Rebellions, the Viscount Buttevant joined the rebels and on the subsequent confiscations of his estates, the friary in Buttevant, together with its glebe, passed into the hands of Edmund Spenser in the Munster Plantation, one of the first of the Plantations of Ireland.

A chalice dating to roughly the year 1600, and almost identical to the Timoleague (Dale-Browne) Chalice is associated with the friary.

While there is some evidence to suggest that the friary was re-occupied as early as the accession of James I, Father Donatus Mooney's Provincial Report of 1617/1618 establishes that the friary certainly had once again reverted to Lord Barry by 1615, or perhaps earlier, indicating that the 1570 lease of Buttevant friary from the crown had been renewed in favour of Lord Barry, albeit with conditions concerning the occupation of the conventual buildings by the friars. Two friars still continued to live in the town and officiated at burials. Father Mooney states that the friars "may not live in the convent because the brother of the late Lord de Barry is bound under pain of heavy fine to heretics, not to permit the friars to live there. He is a Catholic, and is unwillingly forced to act thus, for he holds the monastery from the King, and in other respects, as far as he can, favours the friars. His name is Lord John de Barry" (Bibliothèque Royale, Brussels).

The Brussels manuscript mentions that in 1615 the large church of the friary "still remains, roofed with wooden tiles, and in it are many of the tombs of the nobility. The friary buildings were not well-proportioned, but they were spacious and numerous".

In March 1607, the Protestant bishop of Cork, William Lyon, complained to the Lord Deputy that there was "an abbey at Buttevant where divers friars in their habits go up and down the country to the grief of the godly, in a kingdom where so godly a king as his Majesty reigneth. The warden's name is, as they call him, Conor M'Morice". The complaint also contains the names of the other friars then at Buttevant: "William Foy, Nicholas Sheynan and WIlliam Fer[...]" and notes that in the abbey there were "continual and daily masses and assemblies and conventicles, little for the good of the King and the State".

A further pertinent manuscript, the Brevis Synopsis Provincialis F.F. Minorum compiled between 1626 and 1629 by Father Francis Matthews, is preserved in the archive of the Irish Franciscan Convent of St. Isidore in Rome. It make two references to the friary in Buttevant. It recounts that "in the reign of Queen Elizabeth of England, the friars were at times expelled from thence; some were captured and imprisoned. Although the statues in the church were broken the church itself was left standing because of the tombs of the nobility therein; the convent buildings were, however, destroyed, and yet some of the friars have not ceased to live unto this day (1629) either in the convent or in its neighbourhood. The original founder of the convent was Lord Barry, Viscount of Buttevant, whose family, which has now branched out into the Counts of Barrymore, and other most noble families, have their tombs in the same convent, in which also Lord MacDonagh and many nobles of adjacent estates have been buried from ancient days".

After the outbreak of the Irish Rebellion of 1641, the Franciscan community in Buttevant welcomed the Confederate Catholic army of Lord Mountgarret – one of the leading Catholic magnates in the south of Ireland. The guardian, Father Boetius Egan, accompanied the army and took part in the Confederate Parliament in Kilkenny in 1642. In the ensuing war in Munster, the Protestant commander, Murrough O'Brien, Earl of Inchiquin, assembled his English Parliamentarian army in Buttevant and burned the friary church. Inchiquinn's conduct in the war earned him the nickname Murchadh na dTóiteán – "Murrough of the Burnings". A large quantity of bones from the nearby Battle of Knocknanuss (1647) were said to have been placed in the crypt under the church choir.

Robert Bettesworth, High Sheriff of Cork, reported on 26 November 1731: "There is but one friary in the county and that is in or near Buttevant. I could never hear of what number of fryers it consisted". Again, in the Abstract of the State of Popery in the Diocese of Cloyne compiled and presented to the House of Lords in 1731 it was noted that in the parish of Buttevant there was "one old Mass House. One popish priest. Convents of fryers and nuns; a thatched house within the precincts of the old abbey wherein one or two old fryers have dwelt some time past. One of these was lately dead".

An obituary list of the Clergy of the Diocese of Cloyne, compiled from memory by Bishop William Coppinger (1791–1830), dating from c. 1820, contains the names of those who must have been the last members of the Franciscan community at Buttevant Friary. Unfortunately the list was not written in chronological succession which makes it almost impossible to establish the exact dates of death of the four Franciscan friars mentioned in it. Bishop Coppinger merely states: "Pat Daly, a [Franciscan] [Friar] of Buttevant died of gout and scurvy; Pat O'Neill, a [Franciscan] [Friar] of Buttevant died of a fever in Cork; David Roche, a [Franciscan] [Friar] of Buttevant, of exemplary conduct, died of a fever in Buttevant; and Daniel McAuliffe, a [Franciscan] [Friar] of Buttevant, unemployed and turned horse jobber, died old". By 1820, the Franciscan presence in Buttevant had ended after almost six hundred years.

Samuel Lewis' Topographical Dictionary of Ireland (1837) notes the following of the Franciscan Friary at Buttevant: " The ruins of the abbey are finely situated on the steep bank of the river Awbeg, and consist chiefly of the walls of the nave, chancel, and some portions of the domestic buildings; the upper part of the central tower, supported on arches of light and graceful elevation, fell down in 1814; the tomb of the founder, David de Barry, is supposed to be in the centre of the chancel, but is marked only by some broken stones which appear to have formed an enclosure. On the south side of the nave are the remains of a finely proportioned chapel, in which, and also in the nave and chancel, are numerous tombs and inscriptions to the memory of the Barrys, Fitzgeralds, Lombards, and others".

== Architecture ==
Today, all that survives of the original structure of the monastery is the church, consisting of a nave and a choir. A bell tower stood until on the site until 1814, when it fell down. The cloister and the domestic buildings lay to the north of the remains – a feature typical of Irish Franciscan friaries — though almost nothing remains of them today.

== See also ==
- List of abbeys and priories in Ireland (County Cork)
