= James Barry, 4th Earl of Barrymore =

Irish army officer and politician (1667 – 1748)

The Right Honourable The Earl of Barrymore
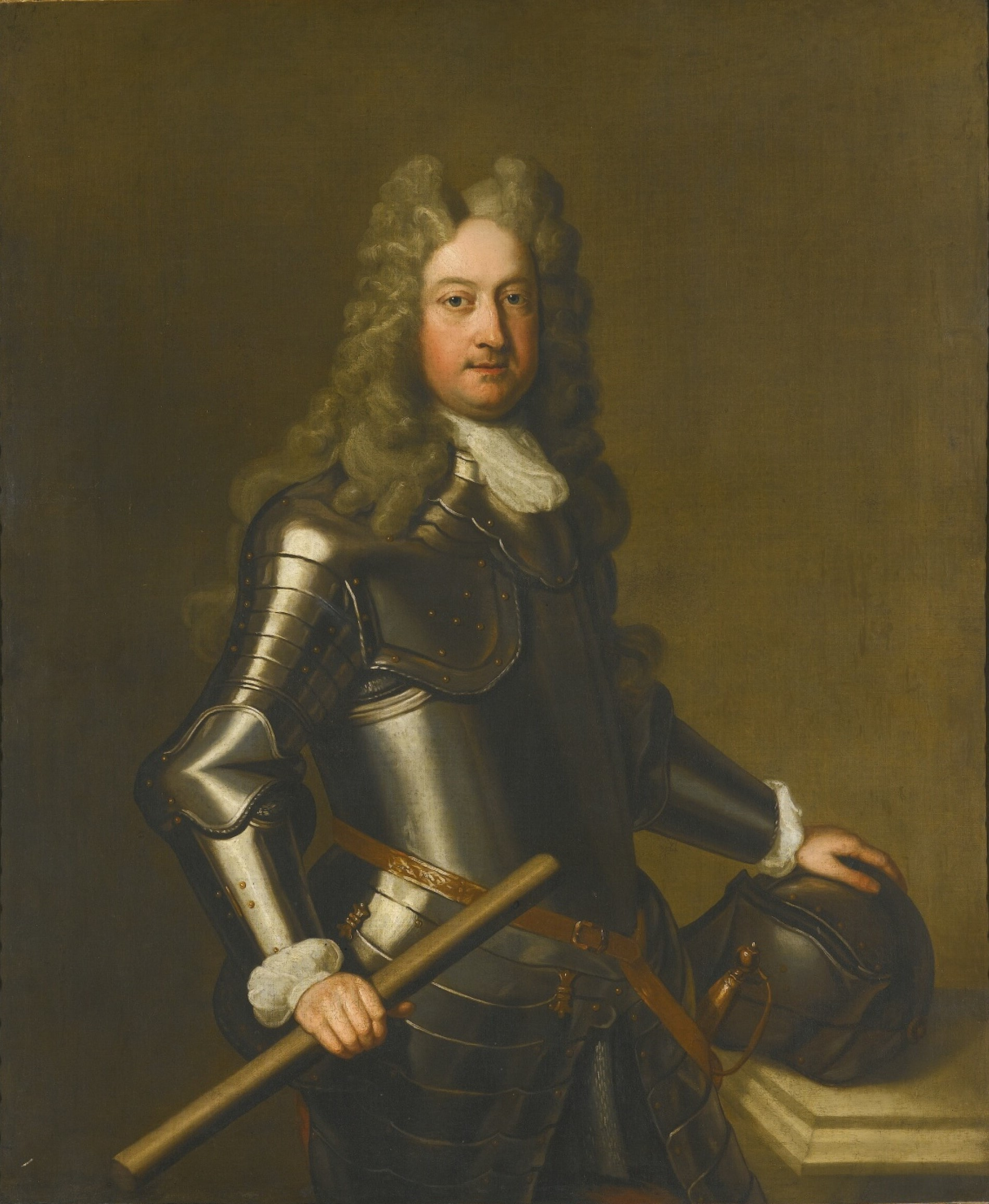
- Portrait by the studio of Sir Godfrey Kneller

Member of Parliament for Stockbridge
- In office 1710–1713 Serving with George Dashwood
- Preceded by: Sir Edward Lawrence; Sir John Hawles
- Succeeded by: Sir Richard Steele; Thomas Brodrick

Member of Parliament for Stockbridge
- In office 1714–1715 Serving with Thomas Brodrick
- Preceded by: Sir Richard Steele; Thomas Brodrick
- Succeeded by: Martin Bladen; Thomas Brodrick

Member of Parliament for Wigan
- In office 1715–1727 Serving with Sir Roger Bradshaigh
- Preceded by: George Kenyon; Sir Roger Bradshaigh
- Succeeded by: Peter Bold; Sir Roger Bradshaigh

Member of Parliament for Wigan
- In office 1734–1747 Serving with: Sir Roger Bradshaigh (1734–1747); Richard Clayton (1747)
- Preceded by: Peter Bold; Sir Roger Bradshaigh
- Succeeded by: Richard Clayton; Richard Barry

Personal details
- Born: 1667
- Died: 5 January 1748

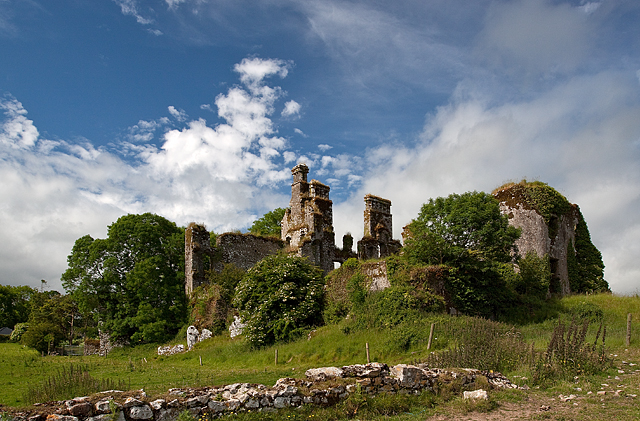
Barrymore Castle, Castle Lyons, Co Cork - ruined seat of the Barrymores

James Barry, 4th Earl of Barrymore (1667 – 5 January 1748) was an Irish army officer and politician.

== Early life ==
The son of Richard Barry, 2nd Earl of Barrymore and his wife Dorothy (née Ferrar), Barry succeeded his half-brother Laurence Barry, 3rd Earl of Barrymore to the Earldom of Barrymore on 17 April 1699.

== Military career ==
Upon William of Orange's invasion of England, Barrymore came out for William against James II and was subsequently appointed as a lieutenant colonel in William's army on 31 December 1688. After the outbreak of the War of the Spanish Succession in 1702, he purchased for 1,400 guineas the 13th Regiment of Foot from Sir John Jacob, 3rd Baronet (his brother-in-law) and became Colonel of the Regiment. He was in turn appointed brigadier-general (c. 1707), major-general (1709) and lieutenant-general (1711). He served under Lord Galway and was captured after the Battle of Almansa in 1707. Upon the accession of the first Hanoverian monarch George I and his proscription of the Tories in 1715, Barrymore was forced to sell his regiment.

== Political career ==
Barrymore took up his seat in the Irish House of Lords in 1704 and was elected Tory MP for Stockbridge for the British House of Commons in the Tory landslide of 1710. He lost his seat to the famous Whig writer Sir Richard Steele in 1713 but regained it upon appeal. In 1715 he was elected MP for Wigan, which he held until 1747 apart from a break during 1727–34. In 1714 he was appointed to the Irish Privy Council. He was a board member of the High Tory Loyal Brotherhood.

== Jacobitism ==
Barrymore embraced the Pretender's cause late in life. In 1740 he conspired with English Tories for a Stuart restoration aided by a French invasion and visited Cardinal Fleury to persuade him to support it. In 1743 Louis XV's master of horse, James Butler, 2nd Duke of Ormonde, travelled to London to meet Barrymore and other Tory peers to conspire to French invasion. The group also sent a communication to the French king through the Jacobite agent Francis Sempill, requesting support for a Frenco-Jacobite invasion. Barrymore was to be part of Charles Edward Stuart's council of regency should he successfully oust the Hanoverians. In February 1744 the British government discovered from a spy in their service in France the English members of the conspiracy and Barrymore was arrested. After the collapse of the Jacobite rising of 1745 the government decided not to prosecute Barrymore.

== Personal life ==
He married, firstly, Hon. Elizabeth Boyle, daughter of Charles Boyle, 3rd Viscount Dungarvan and his wife Lady Jane Seymour, before 1703. They had two daughters and a son:

- Lady Charlotte Barry (d. 1708)
- Lady Anne Barry, married James Maule and died soon afterwards
- an infant son (d. 30 May 1707)

He married, secondly, Lady Elizabeth Savage, daughter of Richard Savage, 4th Earl Rivers and Penelope Downes, in June 1706, unknown to her father. They had one daughter:

- Lady Penelope Barry (18 Apr 1708 – 13 Oct 1775), married General Hon. James Cholmondeley

Lady Elizabeth died in 1714 miscarrying a son.

He married, thirdly, Lady Anne Chichester, daughter of Maj.-Gen. Arthur Chichester, 3rd Earl of Donegall and Lady Catherine Forbes, on 12 July 1716 at St. Anne's, Soho, London, England. They had four sons and two daughters:

- James Barry, 5th Earl of Barrymore (25 Apr 1717 – 19 Dec 1751)
- Hon. Richard Barry (d. 23 Nov 1787)
- Lady Catherine Barry (d. 1738)
- Lady Anne Barry (d. 21 Mar 1758), married Mr. Taylor
- Hon. Arthur Barry (1724 – Oct 1770)
- Hon. John Smith-Barry (28 Jul 1725 – 1784), married Dorothy Smith in 1746 and had issue
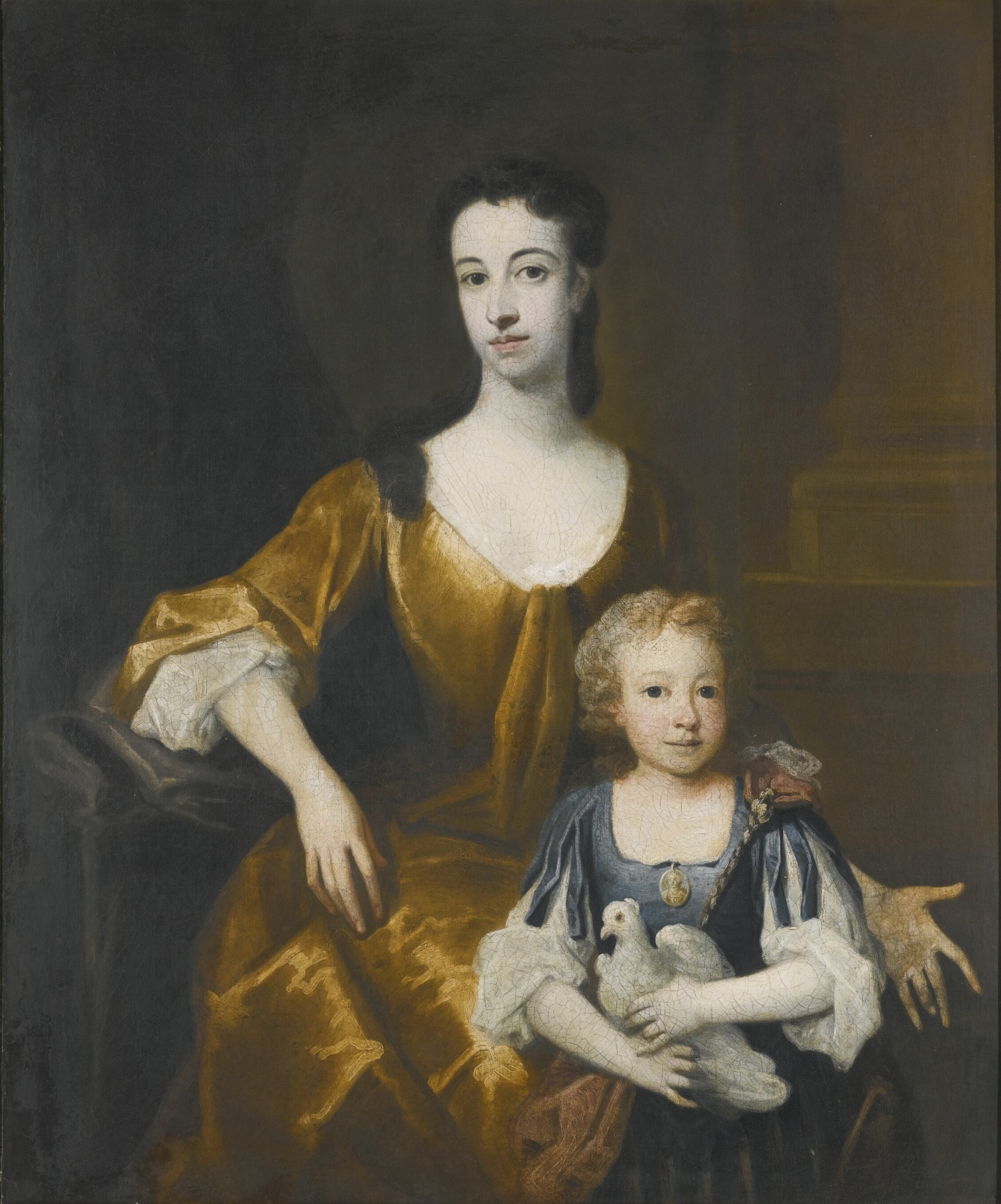
Lady Elizabeth Savage, with their eldest daughter Lady Penelope Barrymore

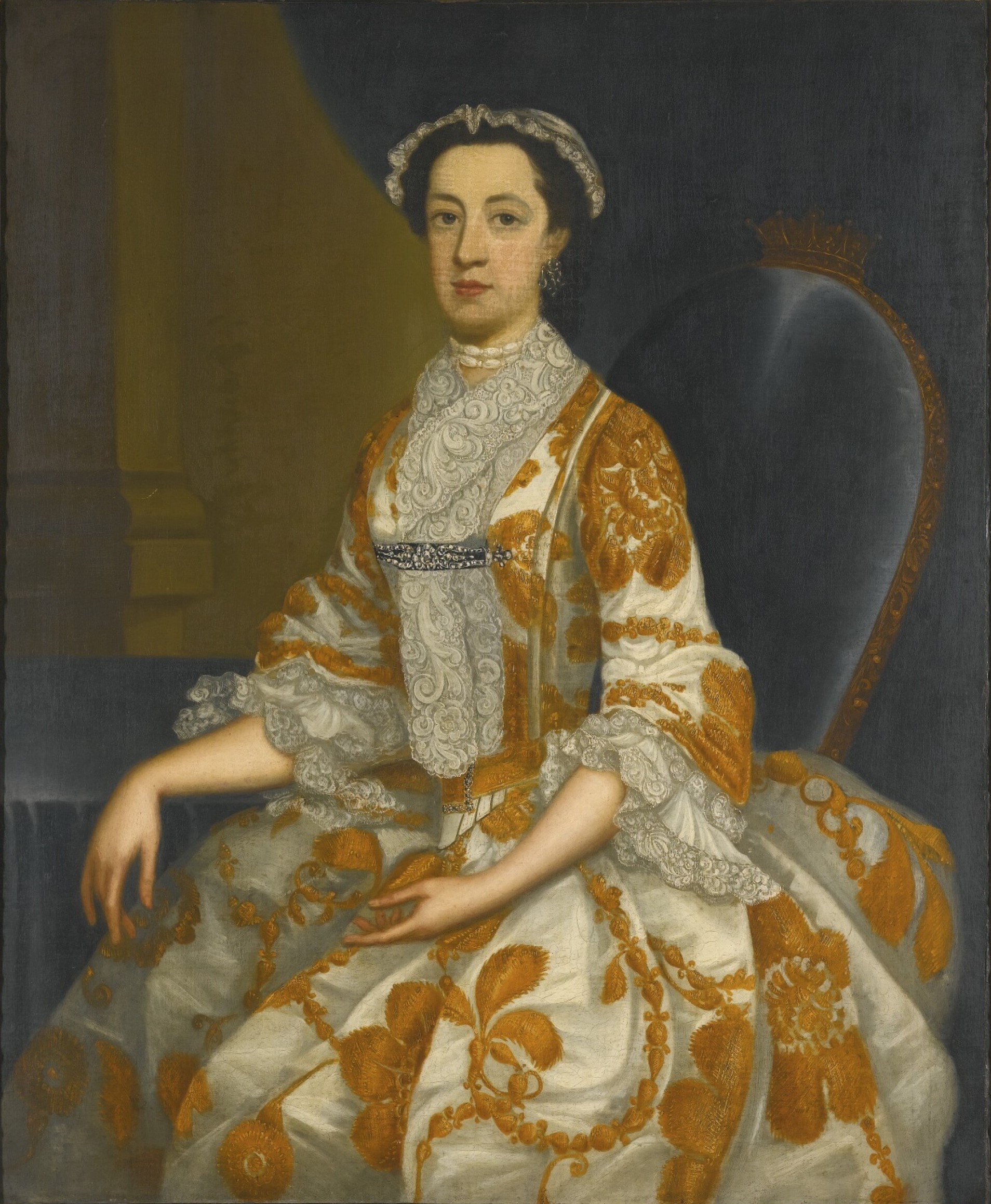
Lady Anne Chichester

== Notes ==
Parliament of Great Britain
| Preceded by Sir Edward Lawrence; Sir John Hawles | Member of Parliament for Stockbridge; 1710–1713; With: George Dashwood | Succeeded by Sir Richard Steele; Thomas Brodrick |
| Preceded by Sir Richard Steele; Thomas Brodrick | Member of Parliament for Stockbridge; 1714–1715; With: Thomas Brodrick | Succeeded by Martin Bladen; Thomas Brodrick |
| Preceded by George Kenyon; Sir Roger Bradshaigh | Member of Parliament for Wigan; 1715–1727; With: Sir Roger Bradshaigh | Succeeded by Peter Bold; Sir Roger Bradshaigh |
| Preceded by Peter Bold; Sir Roger Bradshaigh | Member of Parliament for Wigan; 1734–1747; With: Sir Roger Bradshaigh 1734–1747; Richard Clayton 1747 | Succeeded by Richard Clayton; Richard Barry |
Military offices
| Preceded by Sir John Jacob | Colonel of the Earl of Barrymore's Regiment of Foot; 1702–1715 | Succeeded by Stanhope Cotton |
Peerage of Ireland
| Preceded by Laurence Barry | Earl of Barrymore; 1699–1748 | Succeeded by James Barry |
