= Patrick Purcell of Croagh =

17th-century Irish soldier and landowner

- Died: November 1651; Limerick
- Allegiance: Irish Confederation
- Rank: Lieutenant-General
- Battles / wars: Siege of Limerick (1642); Battle of Knocknanuss; Battle of Rathmines; Siege of Limerick (1650–1651)

Lieutenant-General Patrick Purcell of Croagh (died 1651) was an Irish soldier. In his youth he fought in Germany during the Thirty Years' War. Back in Ireland he joined the Irish Rebellion of 1641 in 1642 when it reached Munster. He commanded units of the Confederate Munster Army, or precursors and successors of it, from 1642 to 1651 under their successive commanders-in-chief, Viscount Mountgarret, General Garret Barry, Viscount Muskerry, the Earl of Castlehaven, the Marquess of Ormond, and finally Hugh Dubh O'Neill. In 1651 at the surrender of Limerick to the Parliamentarians, he was excepted from pardon and executed by Henry Ireton.

== Early life ==
Purcell was probably born in Croagh, County Limerick, between Rathkeale and Adare, south west of Limerick City. His family was Catholic, a rather obscure cadet line of the Purcells, feudal Barons of Loughmoe in County Tipperary.

Purcell married Mary, daughter of Thomas Fitzmaurice, 18th Baron Kerry by his 2nd wife Gyles (or Julia), daughter of Richard Power, 4th Baron Power, of Curraghmore.

As a young man Purcell served Ferdinand III, Holy Roman Emperor, in the Thirty Years' War against Sweden and France. He served under the generals Gottfried Huyn von Geleen and Claus Dietrich von Sperreuth alongside Druckmüller's Croats and cuirassiers, against the Hessians and was wounded, probably at the Battle of Riebelsdorfer Berg on 15 November 1640. His military rank is given as supremus vigiliarum prefectus, which is Latin for the former German rank of Oberstwachtmeister, now Major.

== Irish Rebellion of 1641 ==
Purcell joined the Irish Rebellion of 1641 when it reached Munster early in 1642 and Richard Butler, 3rd Viscount Mountgarret with his rebel army entered County Tipperary from Leinster. Thereupon the Catholic nobles of Munster raised their own army. Donough MacCarty, 1st Earl of Clancarty and Maurice Roche, 8th Viscount Fermoy were foremost among them. Purcell as well as his relative Theobald Purcell, Baron of Loughmoe served in this army. They attacked the English settled there during the Plantation of Munster, besieging many of their castles.

=== Siege of Castletown ===
On 26 March 1642 Purcell besieged Castletown, County Limerick, south east of Limerick City, not far from Croagh, defended by Hardress Waller, the future Cromwellian general. The castle fell in May due to a shortage of water.

=== Siege of King John's Castle, Limerick ===
In May and June 1642 General Garret Barry with the Irish Catholic Munster Army and Purcell attacked Limerick. The town opened its gates willingly, but the Protestants, led by George Courtenay, 1st Baronet, of Newcastle, defended King John's Castle in the Siege of Limerick. The besiegers attacked the castle's eastern wall and the bastion on its south-east corner by digging mines. The castle surrendered on 21 June.

=== Siege of Kilfinny Castle ===
In July 1642, Purcell used artillery, captured at King John's Castle, to take Kilfinny Castle, defended by Elizabeth Dowdall, Waller's mother-in-law.

=== Siege of Newcastle ===
In July and August 1642 Purcell besieged Newcastle, the seat of George Courtenay, which fell on 6 August.

=== Siege of Askeaton Castle ===
On 14 August 1642 Askeaton Castle surrendered to Lieutenant-Colonel Purcell.

== Irish Confederate Wars ==
=== 1st siege of Lismore Castle ===
In 1643, Muskerry led the Confederate Munster Army in an offensive against Murrough O'Brien, 6th Baron of Inchiquin in County Waterford. Purcell unsuccessfully besieged Lismore Castle, the seat of the Earls of Cork. The offensive ended with the cease-fire, known as the Cessation, in September.

=== 2nd siege and capture of Lismore Castle ===
In the campaign of 1645, James Tuchet, 3rd Earl of Castlehaven commanded the Confederate Munster army in its fight against Inchiquin, who had allied himself with the Parliamentarians. Purcell, now Lieutenant-General, captured Lismore Castle, which was defended by Major Power, but Inchiquin doggedly defended the rest.

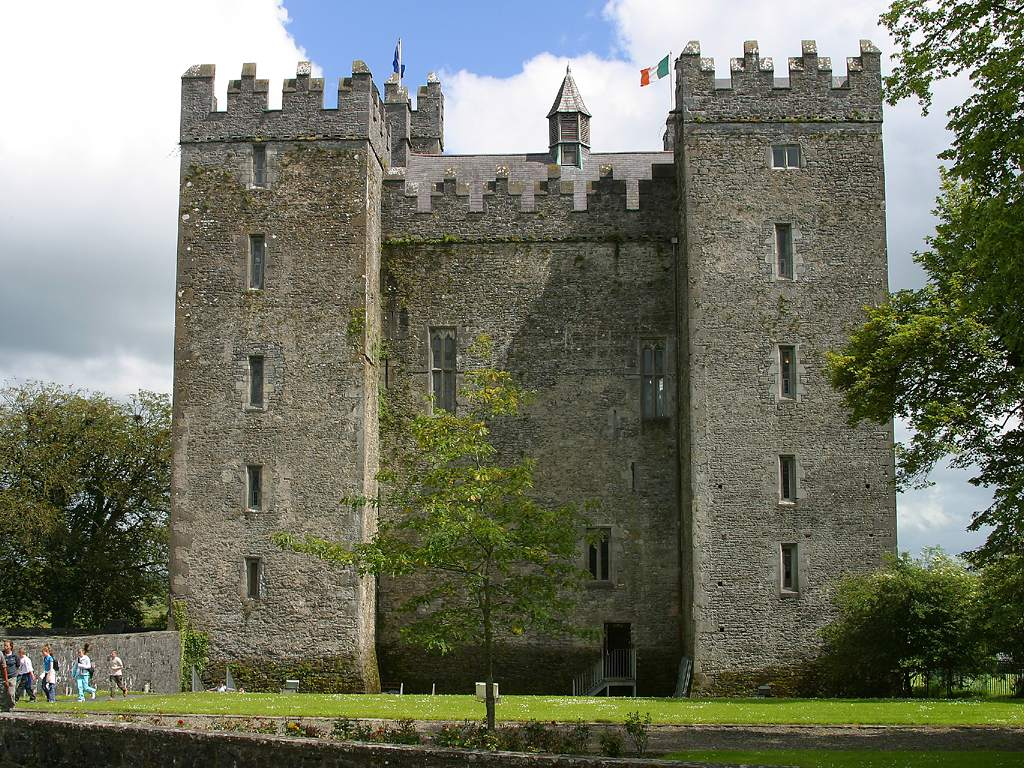
Bunratty Castle, captured by Lord Muskerry and Purcell

=== Siege of Bunratty ===
In 1646 the Munster army, under Edward Somerset, Earl of Glamorgan, who was favoured by Giovanni Battista Rinuccini, the papal nuncio, was sent to besiege Bunratty Castle near Limerick, into which the Barnabas O'Brien, 6th Earl of Thomond, a Protestant, had admitted a Parliamentarian garrison in March. The Confederates lacked money to pay their army. After a setback on 1 April, in which the garrison drove the besiegers from their camp at Sixmilebridge, the Supreme Council replaced Glamorgan with Muskerry at the end of May. Muskerry had Lieutenant-General Purcell, Major-General Stephenson, and Colonel Purcell under him with three Leinster regiments and all the Munster forces. The castle's defences had been modernised by surrounding the castle proper, essentially a big tower house, with modern earthworks and forts defended by cannons. These fortifications abutted on the sea and Bunratty was supported by a small squadron of the Parliamentarian Navy under Vice-Admiral William Penn. On 9 May, Lord Thomond left Bunratty for England by sea. At the end of June Rinuccini came and paid the soldiers £600 (equivalent of about £123,000 in 2023), exhausting the last of his funds. Muskerry brought two heavy cannons from Limerick for the siege. When on 1 July a chance shot through a window killed McAdam, the Parliamentarian commander, Muskerry pressed on and the castle capitulated on 14 July. The garrison was evacuated to Cork by the Parliamentarian Navy, but had to leave arms, munition, and provisions behind.

=== Mutiny of the Munster Army ===
The Confederate Supreme Council had in 1647 confirmed Glamorgan (Note: Glamorgan succeeded his father as 2nd Marquess of Worcester on 18 December 1646, but this change of title is usually ignored when dealing with Irish history.) as general of the Munster Army, but the Confederation lacked the funds to pay the soldiers. Glamorgan was unpopular with the troops and the Munster gentry because he was English. Several regiments mutinied demanding that Muskerry should be appointed general.

Early in June 1647 the Supreme Council met at Clonmel near the Munster Army's camp. On 12 June Muskerry, together with Lieutenant-General Purcell, rode over from the council meeting to the army's camp where the troops acclaimed him as their leader and turned Glamorgan out of his command. The Supreme Council ignored Muskerry's de facto take-over, upheld Glamorgan as the de jure commander who then passed the command officially to Muskerry. In early August Muskerry handed the command over to Theobald Taaffe, another member of the peace party. Neither Glamorgan, not Muskerry, nor Taaffe stopped Inchiquin, who took Cappoquin, Dromana, and Dungarvan in May and sacked Cashel in September.

=== Battle of Knocknanuss ===
On 13 November 1647 Taaffe with the Confederate Munster Army lost the Battle of Knocknanuss against Inchiquin. Purcell commanded two regiments of horse on the right wing alongside Alasdair Mac Colla and his redshanks.

== Cromwellian conquest of Ireland ==
=== Siege of Dublin and Battle of Rathmines ===
In January 1649, the Second Ormond Peace was signed. The Irish Catholic Confederation was dissolved, and replaced with the Royalist Alliance (also called Royalist Coalition) led by James Butler, 1st Marquess of Ormond as lord lieutenant of Ireland. Ormond decided to besiege Dublin, which was held by Michael Jones for the Parliamentarians. Ormond had Thomas Dillon, 4th Viscount Dillon and Purcell under him.

Ormond asked Purcell to occupy Baggotrath. On 2 August Jones sallied and defeated Purcell and Ormond at the Battle of Rathmines.

=== Siege of Limerick ===
Purcell helped to defend the town during the Siege of Limerick. At the surrender on 27 October 1651 he was one of the 22 exempted by name from pardon. He hid in the pest house and was arrested there together with the Terence O'Brien, bishop of Emly. At the court-marshal Purcell fell on his knees and begged for his life. At his hanging he was held up by two of Ireton's musqueteers. His head was affixed on St John's Gate, the southern gate of Limerick's Irishtown.

== Notes, citations, and sources ==
=== Sources ===
- Adams, Constance Louisa (1904). Castles of Ireland – Some Fortress Histories and Legends. London: Elliot Stock. OCLC 751487142.
- Aiazza, Giuseppe (1873). The Embassy in Ireland of Monsignor G. B. Rinuccini, Archbishop of Fermo, in the Years 1645–1649. Translated by Hutton, Annie. Dublin: Alexander Thom. OCLC 1037551732.
- Airy, Osmund (1886). "Butler, James, twelfth Earl and first Duke of Ormonde (1610–1688)". In Lee, Sidney (ed.). Dictionary of National Biography. Vol. 8. New York: MacMillan and Co. pp. 52–60. OCLC 8544105.
- Bagwell, Richard (1895). "O'Brien, Murrough, first Earl of Inchiquin (1614–1674)". In Lee, Sidney (ed.). Dictionary of National Biography. Vol. 41. New York: MacMillan and Co. pp. 320–327. OCLC 8544105.
- Bagwell, Richard (1909). Ireland under the Stuarts and under the Interregnum. Vol. 2. London: Longmans, Green, and Co. OCLC 458582656. – 1642 to 1660
- Carve, Thomas (1859) [1639]. Itinerarium Thomae Carve Tipperariensis (in Latin) (Nova editio ed.). London: Bernard Quaritch. OCLC 932848243.
- Castlehaven, James Touchet (1815) [1684]. Earl of Castlehaven's Review or his Memoirs of his Engagement and Carriage in the Irish Wars. Dublin: George Mullens. OCLC 906518547.
- Coffey, Diarmid (1914). O'Neill and Ormond – A Chapter of Irish History. Dublin: Maunsel & Company. OCLC 906164979.
- Coolahan, Marie-Louise (9 May 2019). "Dowdall [née Southwell], Elizabeth". Oxford Dictionary of National Biography (online ed.). Oxford University Press. (Subscription or UK public library membership required.)
- Coonan, Thomas L. (1954). The Irish Catholic Confederacy and the Puritan Revolution. Dublin: Clonmore & Reynolds Ltd. OCLC 1154300579.
- Duffy, Seán (2002). The Illustrated History of Ireland. New York: Contemporary Books. ISBN 0-8092-2437-2.
- Firth, Charles Harding (1899). "Waller, Sir Hardress (1604?–1666?)". In Lee, Sidney (ed.). Dictionary of National Biography. Vol. 59. New York: The MacMillan Company. pp. 127–129. OCLC 8544105.
- Gardiner, Samuel Rawson (1893a). History of the Great Civil War 1642–1649. Vol. 3 (New ed.). London: Longmans, Green & Co. OCLC 174542284. – 1645 to 1647
- Gilbert, John Thomas, ed. (1879). A Contemporary History of Affairs in Ireland from 1641 to 1652. Vol. 1. Dublin: Irish Archeological and Celtic Society. OCLC 831383411. – Aphorismical Discovery, 1641 to 1648
- Healy, Rev. William (1893). History and Antiquities of Kilkenny. Vol. 1. Kilkenny: P. M. Egan.
- Hennig, John (1952). "Irish Soldiers in the Thirty Years War". The Journal of the Royal Society of Antiquaries of Ireland. 82 (1): 28–36. JSTOR 25510804.
- Joyce, Patrick Weston (1903). A Concise History of Ireland from the Earliest Times to 1837 (12th ed.). Dublin: M. H. Gill & Son. OCLC 815623752.
- Lenihan, Maurice (1866). Limerick; its History and Antiquities. Dublin: Hodges, Smith, and Co. OCLC 1048327570.
- Little, Patrick (2004c). "Waller, Sir Hardress (c.1604–1666)". In Matthew, Colin; Harrison, Brian (eds.). Oxford Dictionary of National Biography. Vol. 56. New York: Oxford University Press. pp. 977–979. ISBN 0-19-861406-3.
- Lodge, John (1789a). Archdall, Mervyn (ed.). The Peerage of Ireland or, A Genealogical History of the Present Nobility of that Kingdom. Vol. 2. Dublin: James Moore. OCLC 264906028. – Earls
- Lodge, John (1789b). Archdall, Mervyn (ed.). The Peerage of Ireland or, A Genealogical History of the Present Nobility of that Kingdom. Vol. 6. Dublin: James Moore. OCLC 264906028. – Viscounts, barons
- M'Enery, M. J. (1904). "A Diary of the Siege of Limerick Castle, 1642". The Journal of the Royal Society of Antiquaries of Ireland. 5th. 34 (2): 163–187. JSTOR 25507363.
- McGettigan, Darren. "Somerset, Edward". Dictionary of Irish Biography. – Online edition (for Glamorgan)
- Meehan, Rev. Charles Patrick (1882). The Confederation of Kilkenny (New revised and enlarged ed.). Dublin: James Duffy. OCLC 561870165.
- Moody, Theodore William; Martin, F. X. (2001) [1967]. The Course of Irish History (4 ed.). Oxford: Roberts Rinehart Publishers. ISBN 1-58979-002-2.
- Murphy, Elaine (2012b). "Two Inventories of Goods Belonging to Sir Hardress Waller in Ireland". Journal of the Royal Society of Antiquaries of Ireland. 142/143: 140–154. JSTOR 24892516.
- Murphy, John A. "O'Brien, Murrough". Dictionary of Irish Biography. – Online edition
- O'Donoghue, John (1860). Historical Memoir of the O'Briens. Dublin: Hodges Smith & Co. OCLC 316665132.
- Prodinus, Antonius (1721). Descriptio Regni Hiberniae (in Latin). Rome: Bernabò. OCLC 458184263.
- Street, Lucie (1988). An Uncommon Sailor: A Portrait of Admiral Sir William Penn. New York: St. Martin's Press. ISBN 978-0-312-01526-8.
- Warner, Ferdinand (1768). History of the Rebellion and Civil-War in Ireland. Vol. 2. Dublin: James William. OCLC 82770539. – 1643 to 1660 and index
- Westropp, Thomas Johnson (1903). "Notes on Askeaton, County Limerick: Part II. The History after 1579". The Journal of the Royal Society of Antiquaries of Ireland. 33 (2): 153–174. JSTOR 25507288.
- Westropp, Thomas Johnson (1907). "The Principal Ancient Castles of the County Limerick: Part II Tudor Period". The Journal of the Royal Society of Antiquaries of Ireland. 37 (2): 153–164. JSTOR 25507604.
- Wiggins, Kenneth (2001). Anatomy of a Siege: King John's Castle, Limerick, 1642. London: The Boydell Press. ISBN 0-85115-827-7.
