= McInerney =

McInerney Mac an Airchinnigh
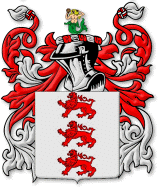
- McInerney Coat of Arms
- Parent house: Dál gCais
- Country: Kingdom of Thomond
- Founder: Donnchadha Mac Con Mara
- Titles: Lord of Ballysallagh; Lord of Ballynacraggie; Lord of Drumharsna

The name McInerney is of noble Irish origin where it is found in the modern Irish form of Mac an Airchinnigh (pronounced [ˌmˠak ənˠ ˈaɾʲəçɪn̠ʲiː]) and in the old and literary forms of Mac an Oirchinnigh and Mac an Oirchindig. The pronunciation of Mac an Oirchinnigh led the name to be sometimes anglicised as McEnherheny in Irish documents from the 16th–19th centuries. The name translates to "son of the erenagh" in Irish ("erenagh" being airchinneach), literally meaning "son of the Lord of church lands". Airchinneach may in turn derive from the twin components of air ("noble") and ceann ("head"), therefore meaning a 'noble-head' or 'Lord', denoting its aristocratic status in medieval Ireland. The coat of arms is three red lions passant, and the motto is Veritas, meaning "Truth". In some places, the motto can be found as Vincit Veritas, meaning "Truth Conquers", or "Truth Prevails".

According to historian C. Thomas Cairney, the MacInerneys were one of the chiefly families of the Dal gCais or Dalcassians who were a tribe of the Erainn who were the second wave of Celts to settle in Ireland between about 500 and 100 BC.

== Naming conventions ==
Male	Daughter	Wife (Long)	Wife (Short)
Mac an Airchinnigh	Nic an Airchinnigh	Bean Mhic an Airchinnigh	Mhic an Airchinnigh

== Erenagh origins ==
The erenagh was an important position in early medieval Ireland and originally was associated with hereditary ecclesiastical office among certain custodian families of monasteries and churches. Later, the office of erenagh passed into the hands of laymen. After the disorder of the Norse wars in the 10th and 11th centuries, the erenaghs were generally lay families who controlled the lands and therefore the economic base of the important churches and monasteries on behalf of the overlord clan. In turn, the erenagh received part of the rents from the land and normally held their own mensal estate which was generally hereditary and passed down among the principal family lineage (Irish, 'derbhfine') and occupied by the 'chief' of the erenagh family. The erenagh families held high social status and were often at odds with the ecclesiastical authorities over the ownership and management of church lands and were often in conflict with rival churches located in hostile clan lands. Some erenagh families maintained their influence over ecclesiastical property right down until the collapse of the Gaelic social system in the beginning of the 17th century.

Because of the proliferation of lay erenagh families, there are many unrelated erenagh families throughout Ireland. The name McInerney is by far the most popular form of the Irish Mac an Airchinnigh and the most numerous as well. Indeed, by 1890 the surname McInerney was the seventh most popular in County Clare, though it seems that its popularity sank over time as many of the family emigrated from Clare during the course of the 20th century. Nonetheless, the name is well established in its historical homeland of Co Clare where it is still a well known local surname.

The surname McInerney has retained a relatively close phonetic approximation of the original Irish surname Mac an Oirchinnigh, aka, Mac an Airchinnigh (son of the airchinneach) which has been anglicised in many different forms such as McEnerhynny, McInerhenny, McKinnerteny, Mckinnerney, Nerhinny, McEnearney, McEnerney, McNertny, and even Kinnerk. Another well known erenagh family is the present-day family of Nerney found in County Roscommon and who historically were the erenaghs of St Patrick's church in the Diocese of Elphin and at Tuam. Their forebears are occasionally mentioned in the Irish Annals during the Middle Ages (in AD1487 for example) and also among the native Irish who received Transplanter Certificates in the 1650s in the vicinity of Stokestown. Despite their ancient lineage, the Roscommon Nerneys appear not to have been as numerous as the McInerneys of County Clare who historically are an offshoot of the important Dál gCais line of the powerful McNamaras of eastern County Clare (historically known as Clann-Cuilein).

== McInerney of Thomond ==
The McInerney surname gave rise to a well known sept based in eastern Thomond, or Co Clare, where the name was first recorded in the early 14th century document 'Triumphs of Torlough' (Caithréim Thoirdhealbhaigh). In the 'Triumphs of Torlough' the McInerney sept is referred to on several occasions as being followers of the McNamaras and were present at the Battle of Dysert O'Dea in 1318 in which the English forces under De Clare were decisively defeated. The sept was an offshoot of the powerful McNamara clan and, tracing their descent to the 12th century Donnchadha Mac Con Mara (Donnough MacNamara) who was recorded as an airchinneach (erenagh) and from whom his son took the name Mac an Airchinnigh (i.e.'son of the airchinneach'). Some pedigrees indicate that this Donnchadha Mac Con Mara was the brother of Cu Mara beg, the Lord of Ui Caisin who was slain in 1151 and one of the early chiefs of the leading branch of the Mac Con Mara family. This would suggest that the McInerneys were an offshoot sept of the leading Mac Con Mara household of eastern Clare.

It is possible that this Donnchadh Mac Con Mara was an airchinneach based at Killaloe or another religious establishment in East Clare. The sept held extensive lands in the townlands of Ballysallagh, Ballynacraggie and Dromoland (parish of Kilnasoolagh near present-day Newmarket-on-Fergus) and were recorded as being in possession of the tower houses of Ballynacraggie and Ballysallagh during the 16th and 17th centuries respectively. These lands seem to have been the traditional 'mensal lands' of the head of the McInerney sept as the leading members of the family were variously recorded as residing on these lands from the 1560s–1650s.

According to papers the antiquarian R. W Twigge copied, the McInerneys built Dromoland Castle and Ballyconeely castle, of which the former has been rebuilt and was until recently the residence of the O'Brien Earl of Inchiquin, and the latter destroyed. R. W Twigge based his research off an 18th-century Irishman named William O’Lionain who wrote that Thomas, the son of Shane Mac Anerheny, erected Dromoland – probably between the 1450s–1550s. The Elizabethan Inquisition records (legal assessments of property transactions) of the late 16th century refer to a long-running land dispute between the two leading factions of the McInerneys. According to the Inquisition record of 1579:

Inquisition, taken at Ennis, on the May 16, 21st year of Elizabeth, before John Crofton, finds that John M‘Inerney, late of Ballykilty, died on the November 5, 1565, seized in fee of Ballysallagh and Ballykilty; that Mahone M‘Inerney, aged 17, at his father’s death, is the son and heir of said John; finds that Mahone, son of Loghlen, and Mahone’s son, Loghlen the younger, both relations of John, had laid claim to his lands and appropriated them to their own use for thirteen years past.

A subsequent Inquisition in 1606 during the reign of James I found that:

Inquisition, taken at the Windmill, on the March 13, 1606, by Humphrey Wynch, finds that Mahone, son of Loghlen MacInerney, died at Ballysallagh, on the November 12, 1572, being then owner in fee of Ballysallagh, Ballykilty with its water-mill, and of Carrigoran, and leaving his son Loghlen his heir-at-law. This son died at Carrigoran on the November 14, 1576, leaving his son Donogh, then aged six years, but now of full age, as his heir; finds that Mahone, son of John MacInerney, disputes the right of his cousin to the ownership of these lands, alleging that his father John, who was the true owner, had died at Dromoland, on the November 5, in the 7th year of the reign of Queen Elizabeth, leaving him, the said Mahone, his son and heir.

A subsequent Inquisition, taken in 1632, finds that Mahone had been in possession, and that he died about the year 1617, leaving a son John to succeed him, a man then of full age.

== Clan McInerney at the time of Elizabeth I ==
Several members of the family are variously recorded in the Elizabethan Fiant records as receiving pardons for various rebellious acts during the upheavals of the 1570s-early 17th century. It can be surmised that most of the 'rebellious activity' was due to the Crown's push for control of feudal duties and rents that were paid by the 'urraghts', or lesser landowners, to their more powerful overlord clans such as the O’Briens and McNamaras. The English policy of establishing a fixed rent for land that was to be paid to the English administration was consolidated in the 1585 agreement known as the 'Composition of Connaught'. During this period the Elizabethan Fiants record a 'Mahowne McShane McInErrihine of Ballykilly [sic Ballykilty] Co Clare, gent', as obtaining a pardon in 1577 for rebellious activities. The same man, 'Maghowne McInerinn of Ballesolloghe, gent' was again record as being pardoned for rebellion in 1589 while in 1602 a 'Mahowne ne Teige McInyrrymy of Ballsallagh', and a 'John Sellenger McEnerie of Ballisallagh gent', were recorded as pardoned rebels. These last two references appeared in the aftermath of Tyrone's Rebellion and these landowners possibly had some local involvement as some Thomond clans supported Hugh O'Neill despite the Earl of Thomond's support for the Tudor royal forces.

The two reliable lists of 'gentlemen and their castles in Thomond' during the reign of Elizabeth record a 'McEnerhyney' (no first name given) as having possession a tower house at 'Ballynacraggie' (now destroyed) in 1574, while the list of 'castles and their gentlemen' in 1570 conspicuously leaves the entry for Ballynacraggie blank, but does record a 'Conogher Oge MacClancy, a Brehon' as being the occupier of Ballysallagh castle – a castle and lands that in the 17th century were closely associated with the McInerneys.

Despite the upheavals following the 'Composition of Connaught' and the land changes of the early 17th century such as the introduction of English Common Law and the abolition of Brehon Law, the sept as a whole remained undisplaced as in 1641 they held, in fee, over 1,400 Irish acres (around 2,240 statute acres) of good pasture land, all primarily in the parishes of Kilnasoolagh, Quin and Clonloghlan.

From these records it appears that three main branches of the sept were active: those associated with the lands in and around Clonloghlan parish (centered on the townland of Caherteige and probably a junior line of the family); another leading branch headed by Mahone McInerney centred on the parish of Kilnasoolagh (especially in the townland of Ballysallagh) and a third branch (which may have a close connection with the Ballysallagh McInerneys) centered exclusively on the townland of Ballykilty in the parish of Quin and represented by John McInerney. It was this John McInerney who appears a direct descendant of the McInerney 'airchinneach' line from the 12th century, as shown by several Gaelic genealogical tracts of the family, and also from an unregistered 'Milesian Pedigree' currently lodged in the Genealogical Office in Dublin showing that on the death of Mathghamhain (Mahone) Mac an Oirchinnigh in 1617, his son John was his sole heir.

== Seventeenth-century upheavals ==
The Cromwellian settlement of 1651 resulted in a massive loss of lands and influence for the McInerneys, with much of their ancestral lands transferred in ownership to Sir Henry Ingoldsby. Much of the remainder of the sept sank in poverty and relative obscurity by the beginning of the 18th century. Notably, at least one member of the family suffered martyrdom during the Cromwellian wars and whose description comes down to us through Fr. Anthony MacBrody's 17th century compilation Propugnaculum Catholicæ Veritatis:

[in 1652] were also hanged Hugh Carrige a parish priest, Roger M‘Namara, Daniel Clancy, and Jeremiah McInerney, friars of Quin convent who were born in Tradree.

It appears that Jeremiah McInerney was born of wealthy Tradree parents, related to the Bunratty Barony and according to other descriptions he was initially beaten with sticks and, after refusing to recant his Catholic faith, the Cromwellian soldiers then dragged him to a tree and hanged him. Edward MacLysaght, in his book "The Surnames of Ireland", also mentions a Fr Lawrence McInerheny who was martyred in 1642, however there appears to be no reference to this individual in the historical record.

The 1659 Census shows that several members of the family (described as 'gent') managed to hold on to some of their traditional lands, while others were recorded in the 'Transplantation to Connacht' book as of receiving less fertile land in the north and west of Co Clare because of their 'rebellious activities' during the 1641 uprising. Several leading McInerneys were transplanted from their original lands in Bunratty barony to other areas including the infamous Burren. It appears that several members of the family were active during the 1641 rebellion, most notably Loghlin McInerney who was present at the siege of Ballyally Castle (he possibly served as a Justice of the Peace for the O’Brien Earl of Thomond) and Mahone McInerney. Both of these men were recorded as being transplanted under the Transplantation to Connacht scheme but it is likely that at least Mahone maintained a portion of his previous lands, as evidenced by his record 1659 as having 19 sub-tenants on his lands in Kilnasoolagh parish. Several other prominent McInerneys were recorded in the 1659 Census and the name was ranked as one of the more numerous in the barony of Bunratty, having 29 'tituladoes' (landowners of some merit). In the barony of Bunratty 'John McInerhidny gent' held lands in Dromkeeny in the parish of Killraghtrish along with 9 tenants under him. This John could have been the John McInerney who occupied Ballykilty near Quin in 1641. Nearby Bunratty is the barony of Inchiquin where 'Loghlen McInerny gent' held lands in 'Rathrahan East' and a total of 13 tenants. This Loghlen is probably the Loghlen McInerney who was an active rebel in the 1641 uprising and was one of the besiegers of Ballyally castle. His name also appears in the 'Transportation to Connacht' lists as receiving several 100 acres (400,000 m^{2}) of re-granted lands in Inchiquin barony, and a Loghlen McInerney is recorded as the 'senechal' of the Earl of Inchiquin manor courts in the 1670s. Further afield, 'Covara McInerny gent' held lands and 13 tenants in Ballyconna South in the parish of Killneeny in Burren barony. This Covera may be the son of Mahone McInerney of Ballysallagh as the namesake Cowerra McInerney was recorded as holding lands there in 1641 and is later recorded in the Inchiquin Manuscripts as undertaking a land contract at Ballysallagh in the 1650s. From these records it appears that Covara is used interchangeably with the names Cumara/Cowerra. In the townland of Fyntra in Kilferboy parish in the barony of Ibricknane, 'Teige McInerny gent' is recorded as holding land and 30 tenants in joint with several other tituladoes.

Numerous references to the name can be found in the Inchiquin Manuscripts and in other various documents dealing with 17th and 18th century land transactions. After the loss of their ancestral estates, members of the family dispersed into the surrounding counties, becoming relatively numerous in Galway and Limerick, as well as in Tipperary. As can be found in the Tithe Applotment Books (c1826) and the Griffth Valuation (c1851) records, McInerneys were quite numerous in Co Clare, as well as in Limerick city and in clusters around the Killaloe and Ballina area, as well as in the district of Castletownarra in north-west Tipperary. Following the 1845–48 famine many of family emigrated to the US, Canada, UK, Australia and New Zealand. By 1876 some McInerneys were still located on lands nearby their traditional patrimony in Kilnasoolagh parish and in that year a Patrick McInerney of Clenagh held 99 acres (400,000 m^{2}) outright as a landowner.

== McInerney folklore ==
According to the compilation of Clare folk stories by the antiquarian T.J. Westropp, stories from the peasantry point toward a connection between the McInerneys and massive iron-age hillfort at Moghane, nearby Newmarket-on-Fergus:

Near Sixmilebridge the tale ran that, in early days, Meihan mac Enerheny, a famous warrior, made the huge fort, or rather hill town, of Moghan as a 'fighting-ring' for himself. He would never allow his tribe to go to war until he had himself challenged and defeated all the enemy’s chiefs. He reigned in great esteem from the Fergus to the Owennagarna river. In his fighting-ring he always gave his opponents the choice of the sun and wind, in spite of which he overthrew them all. There was no king, nor soldier, nor monster that he feared to fight. His admiring tribe gave him a gold-embroidered cap, and the name of Oircheannach (Golden Head), and he died unconquered. I have never heard this tale in the neighbourhood of the fort. It seems artificial, and based on a folk-derivation to flatter the MacInerneys; it is perhaps genuine, though late.

It should be pointed out, however, that the translation of 'oircheannach' (or airchinneach) as 'golden head' is erroneous as it is the Irish word óir that means gold. The combined word airchinneach (air [noble] + ceann [head] ) is clearly the old Irish term for erenagh or steward of churches lands. Nonetheless, it should be remembered that Moghane hillfort lies almost adjunct to the traditional McInerney lands of Dromoland, Ballynacraggie and Ballysallagh.

== Other origins ==
A 19th-century manuscript held at the Royal Irish Academy was scribed by Conchubhair Mac In Oirchinnigh of Baile Ban (Ballybawn) in Clare. The scribal note sets out his direct paternal line stretching back to the 17th century and claims descent from Donnchadha Mac Con Mara, the 12th century progenitor of the McInerney line and erenagh of Cill Da Luadh (Killaloe). The note also refers to the McInerneys as loyal chiefs of the lands of Caherteige, Clonloghan, Drumgeely and Tullyvarragh which locate nearby to the present-day Shannon Airport. It is possible that these lands consisted of the original McInerney patrimony and were awarded to the sept for services rendered as erenaghs. However, by the mid 17th century we can be sure to say that while there was a McInerney interest in these lands, it was only Caherteige that was owned in fee simple by a junior branch of the family, represented by Murtagh and Daniel, sons of Donagh McInerney

The surname should not be confused with the phonetically similar surname McEnery (MacEnery, MacEniry), of Uí Fidgenti origin, not Dalcassian. These MacEnerys, thus cousins of the O'Donovans, held large estates in south-west Limerick well after the disintegration of Uí Fidgenti in the 13th century, and were associated with their feudal overlord, Fizmaurice of Desmond. In Irish MacEnery is Mac Inneirghe (derived from eirghe 'to arise') and the sept held extensive lands in Castletown MacEniry and several of the family were noted émigré in the service of France and Spain in the 17th and 18th centuries.

== Genealogical pedigree ==
MS 23 H.22 p. 11, Royal Irish Academy showing the two main branches of the McInerneys of Thomond. 19th century copy of the original pedigree dated c.1588.

                           Lochlainn
 Mathghamhain (Mahone)         |
    (c1548–1617)  Mathghamhain (Mahone)
         |                     |
   mac Sean (John)  Lochlainn
         |                     |
   mac Con mara  Mathghamhain (Mahone)
         |_____________________|
   mac Tomais
         |
   mac Mathghamhain (Mahone)
         |
   mac Domhnaill  (Donel)
         |
   mac Lochlainn
         |
   mac Lorcain
         |
   mac Murchadha (Murtagh)
         |
   mac Conchobhair (Connor)
         |
   mac Donnchadha i an airchineach agus Clann an oirchinnigh
         |
   mac Domhnaill (Donel)
         |
   mac Con mara
         |
   mac Domhnaill (Donel)
         |
   mac Meanman
         |
   mac Aodh Odhair (Hugh the paleface and 10th century ancestor of the McNamaras)

Several other genealogical pedigrees are in existence regarding the McInerney clan of Thomond.

== People with the surname ==
- Bernie McInerney (born 1936), American character actor
- Brandon McInerney, a student in the 2008 E.O. Green School shooting
- George E. McInerney (1915–1972), lawyer and political figure in New Brunswick, Canada
- George Valentine McInerney (1857–1908), lawyer and politician in New Brunswick
- Gerry McInerney (Galway hurler) (born 1965), Irish hurler
- Gerry McInerney (Clare hurler) (born 1961), Irish hurler
- Ian McInerney (born 1964), British professional footballer
- James O. McInerney (born 1969), Irish-born microbiologist
- Jay McInerney (born 1955), American writer
- Jeff McInerney (born 1960), head college football coach for the Central Connecticut State University Blue Devils
- John McInerney (born 1957), British singer and songwriter, front person of Bad Boys Blue
- John F. McInerney (1912–1967), physician and political figure in New Brunswick, Canada
- Justin McInerney (born 2000), Australian rules footballer
- Leo McInerney (1898–1963), Australian rules footballer who played for Essendon
- Megan McInerney, Australian singer known as Meg Mac
- Monica McInerney (born 1967), Australian-born author
- Niall McInerney (1950–2004), Irish sportsperson
- Nick McInerney (1897–1984), American football player
- Oscar McInerney (born 1994), Australian rules footballer
- Owen McInerney (1826–1890), Irish-born merchant and political figure in New Brunswick, Canada
- Paddy McInerney (1895–1983), Irish sportsperson
- Ralph McInerny (1929-2010), American philosopher, professor, and author
- Sarah McInerney, Irish journalist, radio broadcaster and television presenter
- Shane McInerney (born 1970), Australian rules football field umpire
- Thomas McInerney (born 1937), United States Air Force Lieutenant General
- Tim McInnerny (born 1956), English actor
- Tom McInerney (1905–1998), Irish sportsperson

== See also ==
- McAnearney
- McInerney Holdings, former Irish construction company
- McEnaney
- McEneaney
- McInerny
- Irish clans
