= McEneaney =

McEneaney is a surname. Notable people with the surname include:

- Eamon McEneaney (1954–2001), American lacrosse player
- Eamonn McEneaney, Irish Gaelic football player and manager
- Sarah McEneaney (born 1955), American artist
- William McEneaney, American engineer

== See also ==
- McEneaney Field, stadium in Sioux Falls, South Dakota
- McEnaney
- McInerney
