= Irish College in Seville =

Former seminary

Irish College Seville
- Type: Seminary
- Active: 1608-1612–1767
- Founders: Theobald Stapleton
- Religious affiliation: Roman Catholic; Jesuits(1619-1767)
- Academic affiliations: University of Seville

The Irish College in Seville, was founded in 1612 by Theobald Stapleton (who was also responsible for the establishment of the Irish College in Madrid), like many other Irish Colleges on continental Europe was to train priests to minister in Ireland, who could not be trained at home due to the Penal Laws. The college was dedicated to the Immaculate Conception, so the college was referred to as the Irish College of Immaculate Conception, Seville. In 1619 with King Philip III's support the Jesuit order assumed control of the college.

Prior to the foundation of the college, some Irishmen would have studied at the English College of St Gregory in Seville, including Patrick Fitzsimons (served as Archbishop of Dublin) and Michael Fitzwalter (who served as Auxiliary Bishop of Seville).

== Rectors ==
- Richard Conway, rector (1619-1623 and 1625-1626), appointed as the Jesuits began administering the college, also served as rector of the Irish College in Salamanca (1608-1618) in Santiago
- Thomas (O'Brien) Briones (1633-1644), served as Rector of Irish College at Compostella (1628–33)
- Richard Lynch (1644–47), also a former student.
- William Malone (1655–56), Superior of the Irish Jesuits, and formerly rector to the Irish College in Rome (1637-1642)
- John Usher (1656- ), prefect of studies

== Alumni ==
- John Bathe, martyred priest studied in the Irish College, along with other colleges in Seville
- Edmund Burke, became Archbishop of Dublin
- Luke Fagan, served as Bishop of Meath and Archbishop of Dublin
- Dominic Lynch, became president in the University of Seville.
- Conor O'Mahony, academic, writer and Jesuit priest

== Closure ==
The college like other colleges in Spain was merged into Irish College at Salamanca in 1767 (and following the Jesuit expulsion from Spain). The college archive was transferred to Salamanca, and subsequently as part of the Salamanca Archives in 1951 transferred to St. Patrick's College, Maynooth.
