= McInerny =

McInerny is a surname. Notable people with the surname include:

- Emily McInerny (born 1978), Australian women's basketball player
- Kathleen McInerney (born 1965), known professionally as Veronica Taylor, American voice actress
- Nora McInerny, American author
- Ralph McInerny (1929–2010), American author and professor

== See also ==
- McInerney
