= Irish College at Lisbon =

Jesuit college in Lisbon, Portugal

Irish College, Lisbon
- Portuguese: Collegio de Estudiantes Irlandeses sub invocacaon de San Patricio en Lisboa
- Other names: Irish College of St Patrick, Lisbon
- Type: Seminary
- Active: 1593–1834
- Founder: John Howling
- Religious affiliation: Roman Catholic, Jesuit

Irish College at Lisbon or St Patrick's College, Lisbon was set up during the Penal Times, by a group of Irish Jesuits, supported by a number of Portuguese Nobles, in Lisbon.

== History ==
The religious persecution under Elizabeth and James I lead to the suppression of the monastic schools in Ireland, in which the clergy for the most part had received their education. It became necessary, therefore, to seek education abroad, and many colleges for the training of the secular clergy were founded on the Continent, at Rome, in Spain and Portugal, in Belgium, and in France.

John Howling was born in County Wexford, in 1543. He trained as a priest, and joined the Jesuit order in Rome in 1583. In 1590, Howling was in Lisbon, residing at the Church of Saō Roque, ministering to the English and Irish merchants and sailors. With the help of some Irish and Portuguese merchants, he set up the Confraternity of Saint Patrick, with an aim to establishing a College for Irish clergy in Lisbon.

In 1593, the Irish College of St Patrick, Lisbon (or Collegio de Estudiantes Irlandeses sub invocacaon de San Patricio en Lisboa) was established by Royal Charter. Like other Irish colleges in the peninsula, it was placed under the management of the Jesuits. Howling died in 1599, in Lisbon, after the city had been ravaged by The Plague.

Following the suppression of the Jesuits in Portugal, the College was closed and confiscated by Pombal in 1769, under the pretext that it was a Jesuit establishment. The College re-opened in 1782 under an Irish secular priest, Michael Brady, with the support of the Irish Bishops. Brady was followed by a Bartholomew Crotty. Crotty was one of the first students to attend the re-established Irish College in Lisbon, Portugal. He then served on the staff of the college for almost twenty years, becoming rector in 1799. Crotty returned to Ireland in 1811 and two years later became president of Maynooth College. He was succeeded by a priest by the name of Dunne. The number of students in the Irish college at Lisbon during the eighteenth century was from twelve to fourteen. During the French Revolution, it increased to thirty or forty, falling again to fourteen after 1815.

In 1834, the college was closed, with a Joyce as the final rector. The building which served as the college from 1611 until its closure still stands and is used as a courthouse. Many papers from the College, as with others on the Iberian peninsula are part of the Irish College Salamanca Archive which is the Russell Library in Maynooth College.

=== Clergy educated at Lisbon ===
- Eustace Browne, Bishop of Killaloe, he gained his Doctorate from the University of Évora
- J (John Burke), Bishop of Clonfert (1641–1647), Archbishop of Tuam (1647–1667)
- Edmund Ffrench, Bishop of Kilmacduagh and Kilfenora, educated at the Dominican, College of Corpo Santo, Lisbon
- John Carpenter, Archbishop of Dublin (1770–1786).
- Patrick Geoghegan, Roman Catholic Bishop of Adelaide
- Patrick Kelly, Bishop of Richmond (1820–1822) and Bishop of Waterford and Lismore (1822–1829).
- John Linegar, Archbishop of Dublin (1734–1757)
- Michael Peter MacMahon, Bishop of Killaloe, educated at the Dominican, College of Corpo Santo, Lisbon
- Roche MacGeoghegan, Bishop of Kildare, studied humanities at the Irish College, Lisbon.
- John Murphy, Bishop of Cork, completed his studies in Lisbon.
- Conor O'Mahony, academic, writer and Jesuit priest, completed his studies, and formation as a Jesuit in lisbon, becoming Prefect of Studies at the Irish College
- Michael Rossiter, Bishop of Ferns a cousin of Luke Wadding
- Patrick Russell, Archbishop of Dublin
- Patrick Shee, Bishop of Ossory
- Robert Spence, Archbishop of Adelaide, studied at Corpo Santo, first mass said and Bom Sucesso.
- Alexius Stafford, Dean of Christchurch, MP in Jacobite Parliament
- John Verdon, Bishop of Ferns (1709–1728), ordained in Lisbon he also gained a doctorate from the University of Évora
- William Harold Vincent, educated in Corpo Santo, professor and briefly rector 1821
- Luke Wadding, President of Irish College, Salamanca (1617), Franciscan friar and historian.
- John Pius Leahy, Bishop of Dromore after spending 30 years in Lisbon, rising to be Professor of Philosophy, Theology and Ecclesiastical History.

=== Rectors ===
- John Howling
- Thomas White
- Michael Brady (1782–1799), re-established the college.
- Bartholomew Crotty (1799–1811)
- Joao (O'Duin) Dunne (1811–18??)
- Jacinto Joyce (18??–1834), final rector

== Irish Dominican College of Corpo Santo, Lisbon ==
An Irish Dominican College, was founded in Lisbon, in 1634 by Daniel O'Daly, who was its first rector. The College functioned as a seminary until the mid-nineteenth century, with the Irish Dominicans retaining a presence in Lisbon until 2021.

== See also ==
- English College, Lisbon
- Irish College at Salamanca
