= McEnaney =

McEnaney is a surname of Irish origin. Notable people with the surname include:

- Pat McEnaney (born 1962/1963), Irish Gaelic football referee
- Séamus McEnaney (born 1967/1968), Irish Gaelic football manager
- Will McEnaney (born 1952), American baseball player

== See also ==
Variations on the surname:

- McEnany (surname)
- McEneaney
- McInerney
