= John Bathe (Jesuit) =

John Bathe of Drogheda
- Title: secular priest

Personal life
- Born: John Bath; 26 August 1612 Drogheda
- Died: 5 September 1649 (aged 37) Drogheda

Religious life
- Religion: Catholic
- Institute: Society of Jesus

Senior posting
- Period in office: 1612-1649

John Bathe (1610–1649), was an Irish Jesuit.

Bathe was born at Drogheda in 1610, son of Christopher Bathe, mayor of that town, and his wife, Catherine Warine. He studied at the English Jesuit College at Seville, and was ordained in Spain. After spending a year as confessor at Drogheda, he was admitted in 1638 to the Society of Jesus at Dublin, and sent to the novitiate at Mechlin in the following year. Afterwards he was a missioner in the residence of Drogheda. When that town was sacked by the Cromwellian forces, Father Bathe and his brother, a secular priest, were conducted by the soldiers to the market-place and deliberately shot on 16 August 1649.

== Life ==
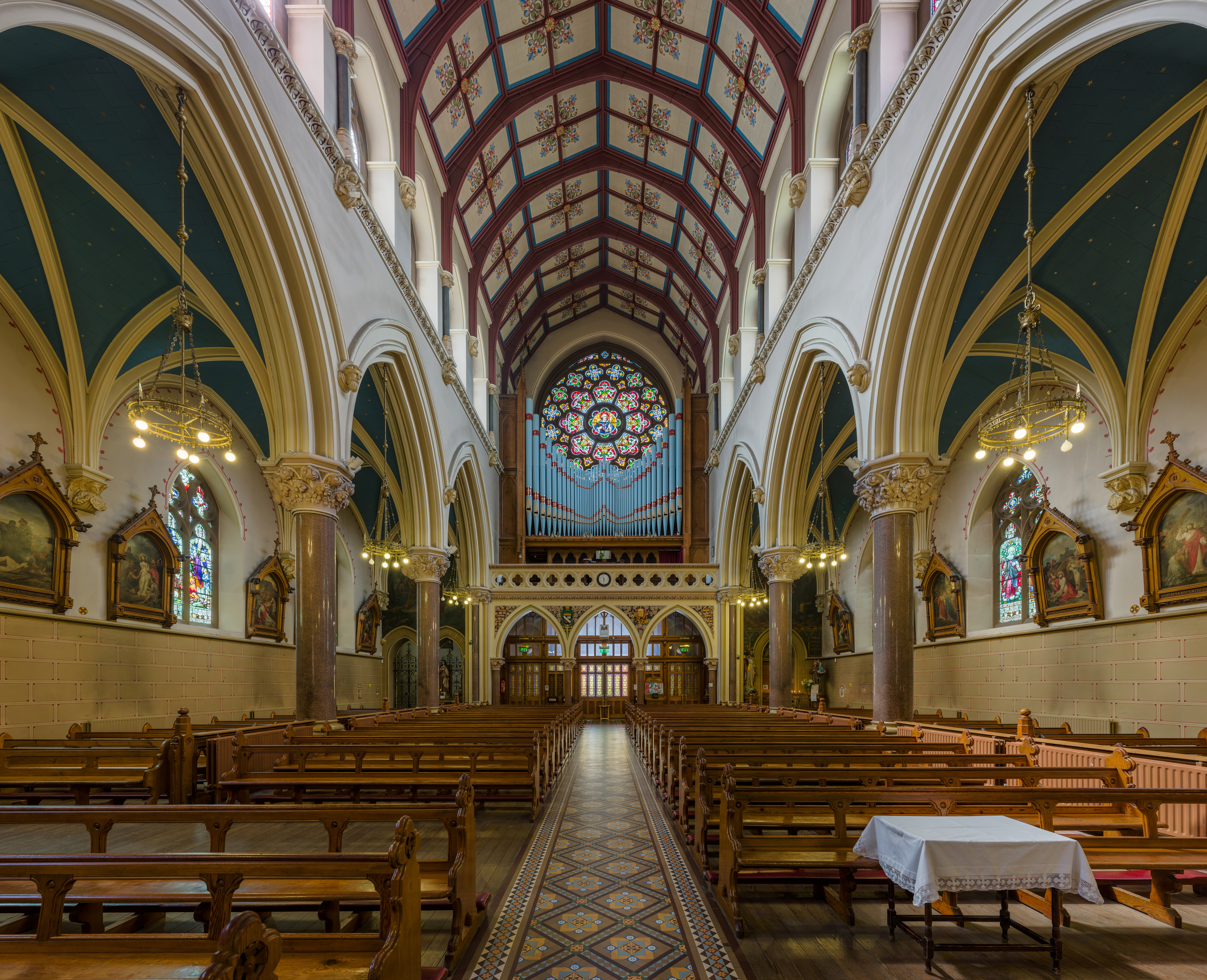
St Peter's Church Nave 2, Drogheda, Ireland - Diliff

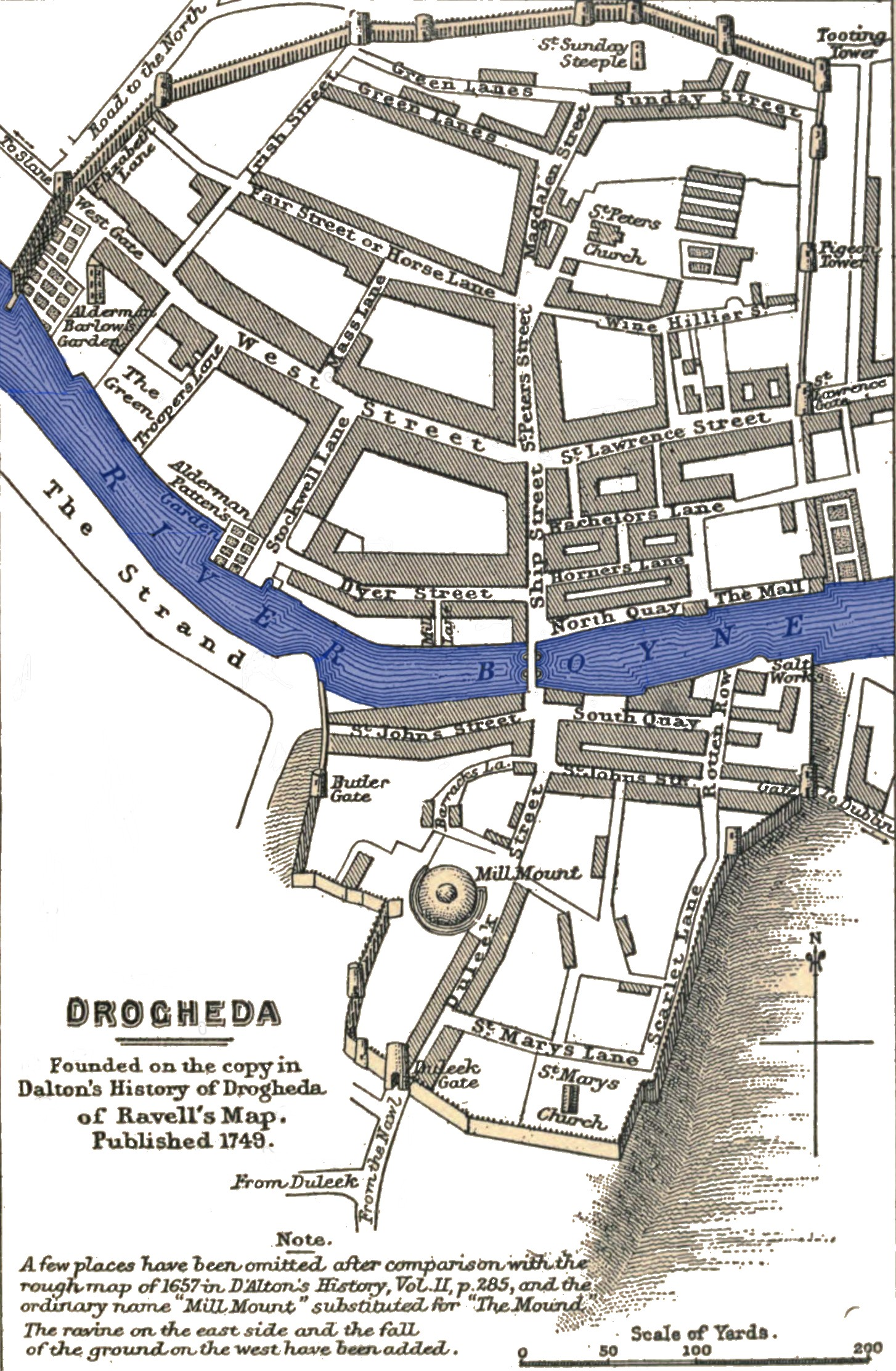
Drogheda 1649

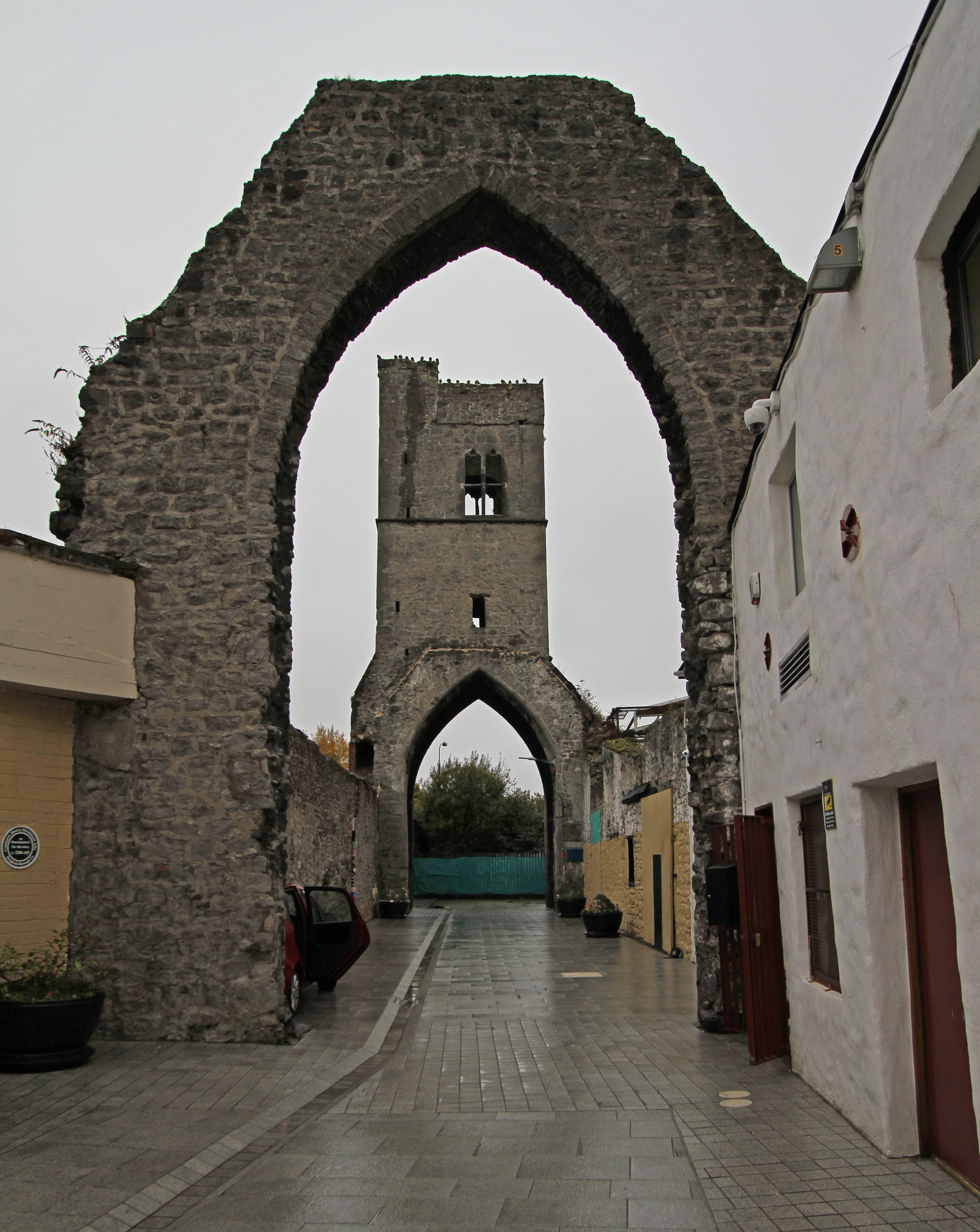
Drogheda-Alte Abtei-04-2017-gje

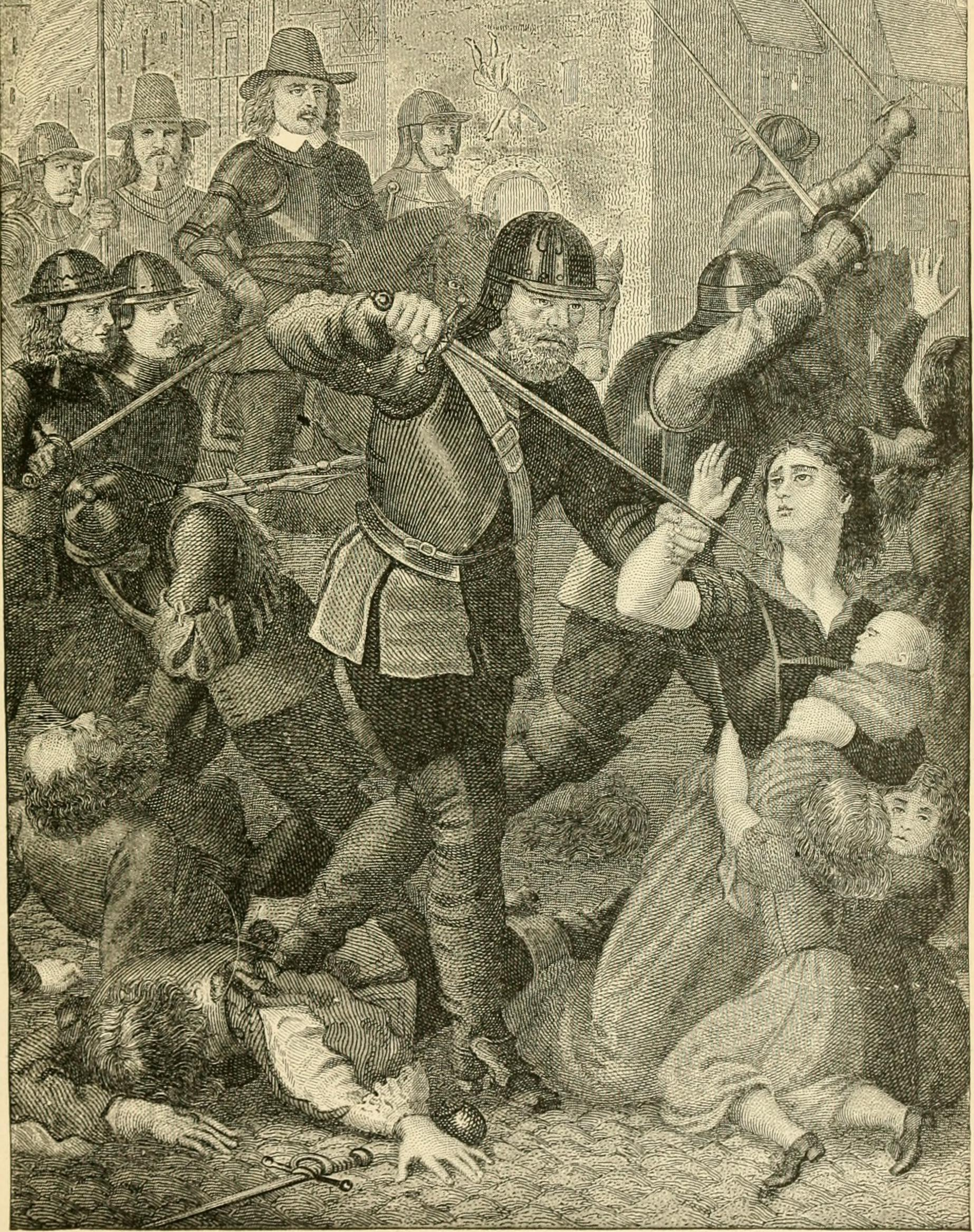
Lives of Irish Martyrs and Confessors (1880) (14781267925)

John Bath or BATHE was an Irish catholic and Jesuit priest during the early seventeenth century. Born on 23 June 1612, in Drogheda, Ireland his father was Alderman Christopher Bathe, a merchant and later Mayor of Drogheda and his wife Catherine (Warine). Her family owned the Drumcondra Castle estates when they married. Sir William Warine was suspected, with good reason of secret Catholicism by the Elizabethan establishment. He probably became a Jesuit later on in life because his uncle, Robert Bathe was a Jesuit in the town of Drogheda. His brother Thomas Bathe became a catholic priest in Ireland. His family was a cadet branch of the family settled at Athcarne Castle, County Meath. They had a long and distinguished history one being knighted as the first catholic member of parliament to be so in 1585. Sir William Bathe was from a most prominent dynasty.

The family owned 60 acres of land from the O’Brien clan of the Earls of Thomond, and another 80 acres at Drumcondra. After the Reformation James Bathe (1500–72) was Chief Baron of Irish Exchequer in Dublin. During the Elizabethan period a son, John Bathe (1525–86) was Chancellor of the Irish Exchequer. A branch of the family at Rathfeagh conspired with William Nugent against the Crown's Lord Deputy in 1581. The Chief Baron's son John Bathe became solicitor-general in Ireland in 1558. But in 1573, the Dublin Corporation revoked a grant of land from 61 years to 21 years prompting William Bathe to apply legal studies to his Jesuit education; he was appointed spiritual director. Clonturk and Drumcondra Castle therefore became a locus classicus for Roman Catholic legal resistance. Queen Elizabeth I did not want to be seen as a persecutor, and from 1560 was minded to appear tolerant in Ireland. William bathe became a personal friend of the Protestant Lord Deputy Sir John Perrot. However James Bathe quickly came under suspicion as a crypto-Catholic. In 1577, John Bathe, being a barrister of Middle Temple was replaced as attorney-general and principal solicitor after only a year in office with a promotion as Chancellor. Dublin Castle was encouraged by Westminster to trust Catholics. James brother John Bathe became a close friend of Duke of Buckingham, the swashbuckling cavalier royal favourite. After the Gunpowder Plot catholic priests were no longer welcome in England. Sir John Bathe became impassioned by the unfairness of discrimination against Catholics and devoted the rest of his life to a legal solution to the accusation of disloyalty. The New English however were not able to impose order in Ireland to sustain tolerance of the proposed "Graces" for Catholics. King Charles I issued warrants for both the Old English and the new settlers to swear the Oath of Supremacy protesting loyalty to the Crown. It was how he would raise "trained bands" for war of 2,700 Foot and 300 Horse.

A Humanities student with the Jesuits in Drogheda he was admitted to the Irish College in Seville with the Society of Jesus. From there he went to another Jesuit College at St Hermengild in Seville. His uncle William Bathe was ordained at the Jesuit College at Salamanca 25 years earlier where he had met Father Hollywood, the agitator for Jesuitical radicalism in Ireland. He was responsible for the Janua Linguarum (the advent of languages) that referred to the ancient tongues of Celtic Christianity. The Jesuits succeeded in linking education with religion, spiritual zeal with Catholic action. William's Anglo-Irish aristocratic connections - his wife was the niece of 10th Earl of Kildare, gave the Bathe family confidence of their security in Ireland. But Charles I demanded conformity in 1630 during the Personal Rule imposing control from Trinity College over the Jesuit colleges. In 1635 he was ordained a Catholic Priest in Spain. Three years later he returned to Drogheda to study with Robert Nugent, an Anglo-Irish Jesuit sent from England. He arrived by ship into Mechlin, Spanish Netherlands on 17 May 1639, where Bathe became a Novitiate to the Society of Jesus.

During the Civil wars Bathe made a secret journey to England where he was hidden by his old friend Father Nugent. The Irish biography that he returned to Drogheda in 1641. At the time the King's servant, Earl of Strafford was trying to put down a Protestant Revolt that had led to the massacre of Roman Catholics in the north of Ireland. The Rising brought an end to a period of toleration. Strafford was recalled by the Puritans in the Parliament against the King's wishes and sentenced to death for proving a diligent and successful king's messenger. Strafford's 'peace-keeping' role however had gained the enmity of Protestant merchant class so powerful in the House of Commons. It was the outbreak of violence in England in 1642 that spurred Bathe onwards into England to 'spy' for the King's and Catholic cause against the Parliament. Irish armies wanted supplicants, particularly among officers to receive the sacraments and holy eucharist. Priests came over with the Levies in Ireland and Wales from the west, often to great personal danger to themselves. Lord Herbert of Glamorgan was a well-known Roman Catholic, although his religion was banned by Parliament. And yet he fought as one of the generals (not very well) on the Welsh Marches and in the west of England. The Confederation of Kilkenny from 1642 was designed to bring Catholicity into Ireland and protect it. Kilkenny was designated a Jesuit capital "and so keep out Protestancy", wrote the Oxford historian Anthony a Wood. Bishop Father Nugent published White's Gesta Dei per Hibernos (1646) showing the erudition of the Irish Jesuits and their propensity for scholarship. The Counter-Reformation in Ireland was a continuance of the High Renaissance, preserving the usage of Latin in the church language and the vernacular traditions that were not English. The theocratic government of Kilkenny restored the Catholic Grammar School, while restoring plays towards a demonstration of Faith. The Confederation clergy members, like Bishop Emly sought out to defend the "seek the sheep and defend them from the wolf" Lord Inchiquin. The Truce signed by 13 bishops at Kilkenny on 27 April 1648. By 1649 the power of the Confederate priests was on the wane, yet they still opposed any placatory remarks with the Parliamentarians.

On 16 August 1649 he was executed by beating and musket shots during the siege of Drogheda on Cromwell's Orders. His brother Thomas Bath, a secular priest was also slain at Drogheda. In September 1649, Cromwell's army entered the town and set about punishing the inhabitants. No one was spared: men, women and children were put to the sword. In total about 2,000 civilians were killed in the siege. Cromwell's forces entered the town on 11 September and burnt St Paul's Church with its parishioners inside. The ferocity of Cromwell's response surprised the Irish Catholics; it spread fear and loathing throughout the land.

== Bibliography ==
- Tanner, Societas Jesu usque ad sanguinis et vitae profusionem militans, 138.
- Hogan, Catalogue of Irish Priests, 42.
- Hogan, Catalogue of Irish Jesuits, 9.
- Foley, Records, vii, 41.
- Oliver, Jesuit Collections, 232.
- Southwell, Bibliography Scriptorum Society Jesu, 313.
- Hawkins, History of Music, iii, 356–60.
- Fr Fergus O Donoghue S.J., 'Irish Priest Archives', Archivum Hibernicum, XLI, 1986, p. 64-6.
- Fr Fergus O’Donoghue S.J., Developments of the Irish Jesuits 2001,’ Unpublished Notes.
- Fr Denis Murphy S.J., Our Martyrs, (Dublin: Fallon & Co., 1896)
- Vera Moynes (ed.) 'The Jesuit Irish Mission: A Calendar of Correspondence, 1566–1752, XXXVIII (Subsidia series, vol.16)
- Fr Stephen Redmond, 'A Guide to the Irish Jesuit Province archives', Archivum Hibernicum, L, 1996, p. 127-131.
- Wood, Anthony a, Athenae Oxon (ed. Bliss) ii, 146.
- Biography Britannia ed. Kippis
- Ware, Writers of Ireland (ed. Harris), 101.
