= Conor O'Mahony (priest) =

Irish Catholic priest

The Reverend Conor O'Mahony Conchobhar Ó Mathghamhna SJ

- Arms of the O'Mahony clan.
- Born: 1594; Muskerry, Kingdom of Desmond
- Died: 28 February 1656 (aged 62); Lisbon, Portugal
- Education: Irish College in Seville; University of Évora; University of Lisbon
- Notable work: "An Argument Defending the Right of the Kingdom of Ireland for Irish Catholics against English Heretics"
- Title: Priest; Theologian; Author
- Theological work
- Tradition or movement: Catholicism (Counter-Reformation)
- Notable ideas: Restoration of High Kingship of Ireland & Irish Catholic independence

Conor O'Mahony (Irish: Conchobhar Ó Mathghamhna; 1594–28 February 1656) was an Irish Catholic priest, academic and author who belonged to the Society of Jesus. He was educated in Spain and Portugal, spending much of his life in the latter country. O'Mahony is best known for his 1645 work Disputatio apologetica de iure regni Hiberniae pro catholicis Hibernis adversus haereticos Anglos ("An Argument Defending the Right of the Kingdom of Ireland for Irish Catholics against English Heretics"), which, in the context of the Irish Confederate Wars was one of the most radical Irish nationalist arguments for full national sovereignty, calling for the restoration of the Gaelic kingship and creation of an explicitly Catholic state. Under the name "Mercurius Ibernicus" he is also the most likely candidate for having authored an anonymous news pamphlet in Lisbon.

== Biography ==
=== Early life and education ===
O'Mahony was born in Muskerry, in what is today western County Cork. He was born during the last days of the Gaelic Kingdom of Desmond, which was under the rule of the MacCarthy dynasty. The O'Mahony (Ó Mathghamhna) clan were their kinsmen, as fellow members of the Eóganachta. His childhood was thus during the years of the Tudor conquest of Ireland and harsh suppression of the native Irish Catholic population.

He travelled to Habsburg Spain in 1614 for his education, attending Theobald Stapleton's Irish College in Seville. Here he graduated as a Master of Arts and a Doctor of Divinity, having studied philosophy and theology. He decided on a vocation of consecrated life and was admitted to minor orders in June 1618, before becoming ordained to the Catholic priesthood the following year in December. He moved to the Kingdom of Portugal, where there was also an active Irish diaspora community at Lisbon. Here, as Cornelius a Sancto Patricio, in 1621, he entered the novitiate of the Society of Jesus (the Jesuits). He served as prefect of studies at the Irish College at Lisbon. He was a professor of Moral Theology at São Miguel Island's College in the Azores from 1626 to 1633. There was a large eruption at Furnas in 1630, in what is known as the "Year of the Ashtray", O'Mahony was involved in relief efforts at Ponta Delgada. Following this, he held the Chair of Moral Theology at the Jesuit-ran University of Évora back on the Portuguese mainland, from 1633 to 1635. After this, he was transferred to the capital city, where he was Professor of Dogmatic Theology at the University of Lisbon from 1636 to 1641.

=== Disputatio and Irish nationalism ===
Though careful not to offend his Habsburg hosts, O'Mahony lived in Portugal during the Iberian Union and the subsequent Portuguese Restoration War, whereby the Portuguese patriots wanted to restore their native House of Braganza to the throne in place of the Spanish Habsburgs and thus their national sovereignty. The year after the Portuguese Revolt began, in his homeland the Irish Rebellion of 1641 was taking place. Observing the apologetics of his Portuguese Jesuit colleagues, he took note and formed his own intellectual framework for justifying a similar position for the Irish Catholic provisional government of the Kingdom of Ireland formed by the Confederate Catholic Association of Ireland. After standing down from public teaching in universities, he authored and published his most notable text at Lisbon in 1645: Disputatio apologetica de iure regni Hiberniae pro catholicis Hibernis adversus haereticos Anglos ("An Argument Defending the Right of the Kingdom of Ireland for Irish Catholics against English Heretics"). It has two parts within it, an apology for the right of the Irish Catholics to revolt against the King of England and secondly the suggested path they should take next. To conceal his identity he published it under the name "C.M. Hiberno" and its publishing place as "Frankfurt."

In the work, O'Mahony laid out all of the arguments used to legitimise the presence of the English monarchy in Ireland, from Laudabiliter onwards and seeks to debunk them point by point, using a legal and moral basis. The major areas he measures English rule up against from a perspective of Catholic moral teaching are: just war, religious mission, consent and peaceful possession. O'Mahony argued that Henry II of England's invasion of Ireland was "evil" because it sought to restore an adulterer, Diarmaid mac Murchadha, to his throne. And, in any case, the invasion went well beyond restoring him to the Kingdom of Leinster and encroached upon the kingdoms and lands of other, uninvolved parties (failing to qualify under just war theory). In regards to the Irish kings who submitted to Richard II as Lord of Ireland, O'Mahony states this was not universal among all the kings and that this had been gained under duress; "The law of nature de facto will invalidate every contract concluded or extorted by grave fear and coercion." He also argued that Laudabiliter had been obtained by the Normans under "false pretences" in the first place, but whatever the argument may have been, now that England had embraced Protestantism (a heresy in the eyes of the Catholic Church), including its last three monarchs — Elizabeth I, James I and Charles I— its claims to "religious mission" in Ireland was now totally null and void. In formulating these arguments he drew on the works of Robert Bellarmine, Francisco Suárez and Luis de Molina.

The Exhortatio on which the work ends, draws upon Old Testament biblical analogies (calling on the Gaels to be like the Israelites in their revolt against Nahash, King of the Ammonites, a cruel tyrant who would "pluck the right eye out of every Hebrew"), he called upon the Irish Catholics to choose "a Catholic king, an indigenous or native-born Irishman who will be able to govern them as Catholics", as well as this, the remaining Protestant "heretics" in Ireland should either be driven out or killed. He warns the native Irish to be unified by a common cause in the campaign, as the English had always succeeded in playing Irish princes off against each other. Although the work was intended as a boost to the radical wing of the Catholic Confederacy; that of Owen Roe O'Neill and Cardinal Giovanni Battista Rinuccini, contrary to the more "moderate", compromising, pro-Stuart Old English Irish Catholic royalists who wanted to make peace with the Marquess of Ormond; it became a taboo and banned book. In general, the Confederates wanted to distance themselves from some killings of Protestant civilians which took place earlier in 1641 and also, leave the door open to at least the possibility of the rights of Catholics being restored under a Stuart monarchy. The Supreme Council of the Confederacy had it burned in Kilkenny and Franciscan Fr. Peter Valesius Walsh attacked it nine different sermons in St Canice's Cathedral. Even in Portugal, after pressure was applied by Sir Henry Compton, the book was condemned twice and banned by the state.

=== Influence and death ===
Although it had minimal influence, the book had a quasi-Black Legend afterlife in politics. The radical faction within the Confederates referred to the Confederate Oath of Association as their foundation, rather than the Disputatio apologetica. Nevertheless, Sir Kenelm Digby, an English Catholic diplomat, who represented Charles I in Rome, complained that Cardinal Rinuccini tolerated the Disputatio apologetica (he had refused to hand Athlone priest Fr. John Bane over to the authorities after he was found with a copy) and for the Old English within the Irish Confederacy they feared that the book was on the backburner to endorse making Owen Roe O'Neill the High King of Ireland in place of the Stuart dynasty if the opportunity availed itself.

Sometime after the defeat of the Irish Confederates (and also the Irish Royalists) following the Cromwellian conquest of Ireland, O'Mahony did eventually go public with the fact that he had authored the document. He admitted this to Patrick Plunkett, the Bishop of Ardagh. Although he was healthy and in good shape, soon after, he suddenly fell ill and died at the Jesuit House in Lisbon on 28 February 1656. The circumstances of his death have never been fully investigated. The "go-to" reference work for the Irish view of the period has tended to have been the six-volume Commentarius Rinuccinianus compiled by Fr. Barnabas O'Ferrall and Fr. Daniel O'Connell (later edited by Fr. Stanislaus Kavanagh) and makes no mention of the work. Protestants used the document as evidence of "Catholic treason" sporadically, even printing copies in 1826 in the campaign against Catholic Emancipation. The work was finally translated into English from the Latin by John Minahane of the Aubane Historical Society in 2010.

== Works ==
- Disputatio apologetica de iure regni Hiberniae pro catholicis Hibernis adversus haereticos Anglos — "An Argument Defending the Right of the Kingdom of Ireland for Irish Catholics against English Heretics" (1645)

The Prague-based Franciscan Fr. Anthony Bruodin published Propugnaculum Catholicae Veritatis — a catalogue of Irish Catholic martyrs under Henry VIII, Edward VI, Elizabeth I and James I — under the name of "Cornelius O'Mollony" (a reference to Conor O'Mahony), but O'Mahony was already dead in 1671 when it was published.

== See also ==
- Philip O'Sullivan Beare
- Anthony Bruodin
- Flaithrí Ó Maolchonaire
- John Cornelius (priest)
- Irish people in mainland Europe
- Edmund Spenser
