= McAnearney =

McAnearney is a surname, from Irish Mac an Airchinnigh, Mhic an Airchinnigh. Notable people with the surname include:

- Jim McAnearney (1935–2017), Scottish football player and manager
- Tom McAnearney (1933–2012), Scottish football player and manager

== See also ==
- McInerney
