= Anthony Bruodin =

Irish Franciscan friar and philosopher

Anthony Bruodin (Irish: Antóin Mac Bruideadha; 1625 – 7 May 1680), also known as Antonius Bruodinus or Bruodine, was an Irish Franciscan friar, philosopher, theologian and historian. He wrote works of theology, and compiled materials on Early Modern Catholic martyrology. Broudin was exiled from Ireland and while at Prague, authored his 1669 work Propugnaculum Catholicae Veritatis. He saw himself as defending the Irish Gaels from the slanders of Anglocentric writers such as William Camden, Richard Stanihurst and Thomas Carve. His family were hereditary ollamh to the Ó Briain when they were kings of Thomond.

== Life ==
Bruodin was born in County Clare, Kingdom of Ireland. The area he lived in had not long ago been an independent Gaelic kingdom known as Thomond and he came from a family of ollamh. He became a Recollect friar as a young man at Quin, County Clare. he joined the Franciscan order, completing his novitiate in Quin. Bruodin travelled to Rome in 1643 and studied under Luke Wadding, a fellow Franciscan.

Around the year 1650, Bruodin fled to Bohemia where he joined the Czech Franciscan community at Olomouc, where he was custos from 1663. He then moved to Prague in 1668, where he became a custos at the Church of Our Lady of the Snows and perhaps a convent at Jindřichův Hradec. As a scholar Bruodin taught first in the Irish Franciscan College in Prague, later in other Czech monasteries as a lecturer of philosophy (1656-1657).

== Works ==
Bruodin wrote:

- Œcodomia Minoriticæ Scholæ Solamonis, Johannia Duns Scoti, sive Universæ Theologiæ Scholasticæ Manualis Summa, Prague, 1663.
- Corolla Œcodomiæ Minoriticæ Scholæ Salamonis, Doctoris subtilis; sive pars altera Manualis Summæ totius Theologiæ Speculativæ, Prague, 1864.
- Propugnaculum Catholicæ Veritatis, Pars prima Historica, in quinque libros distributa, Prague, 1668. In its fifth book he attacked Lyra Hibernica by the Anglo-Irish historian Thomas Carve, in a chapter De Carve seu Carrani erroribus et imposturis. This provoked from Carve the Enchiridion Apologeticum, Nuremberg, 1670. In answer to this a tract Anatomicum Examen Enchiridii was published at Prague in 1671, by Bruodine under the pseudonym Cornelius O'Mollony. A final work in the controversy was the Responsio Veridica by Carve (Sulzbach, 1682).
- Armamentarium Theologicum, Prague.

Inaccuracies have been found in Bruodin's work on Irish martyrs.

The author Antonius Prodinus has been taken to be Bruodin; he wrote Descriptio Regni Hiberniæ, Sanctorum Insulæ, et de prima origine miseriarum & motuum in Anglia, Scotia, et Hibernia, regnante Carolo primo rege, printed at Rome, 1721, under the editorship of the exiled son of Phelim O'Neill.

== See also ==
- Philip O'Sullivan Beare
- John Colgan
- Conor O'Mahony (priest)
