= William McEneaney =

William McEneaney from the University of California, San Diego, was named Fellow of the Institute of Electrical and Electronics Engineers (IEEE) in 2014 "for contributions to optimal control and estimation in nonlinear systems".
