= Siege of Limerick (1642) =

Coordinates: 52.669722°N 8.625556°W

- Part of the Irish Confederate Wars
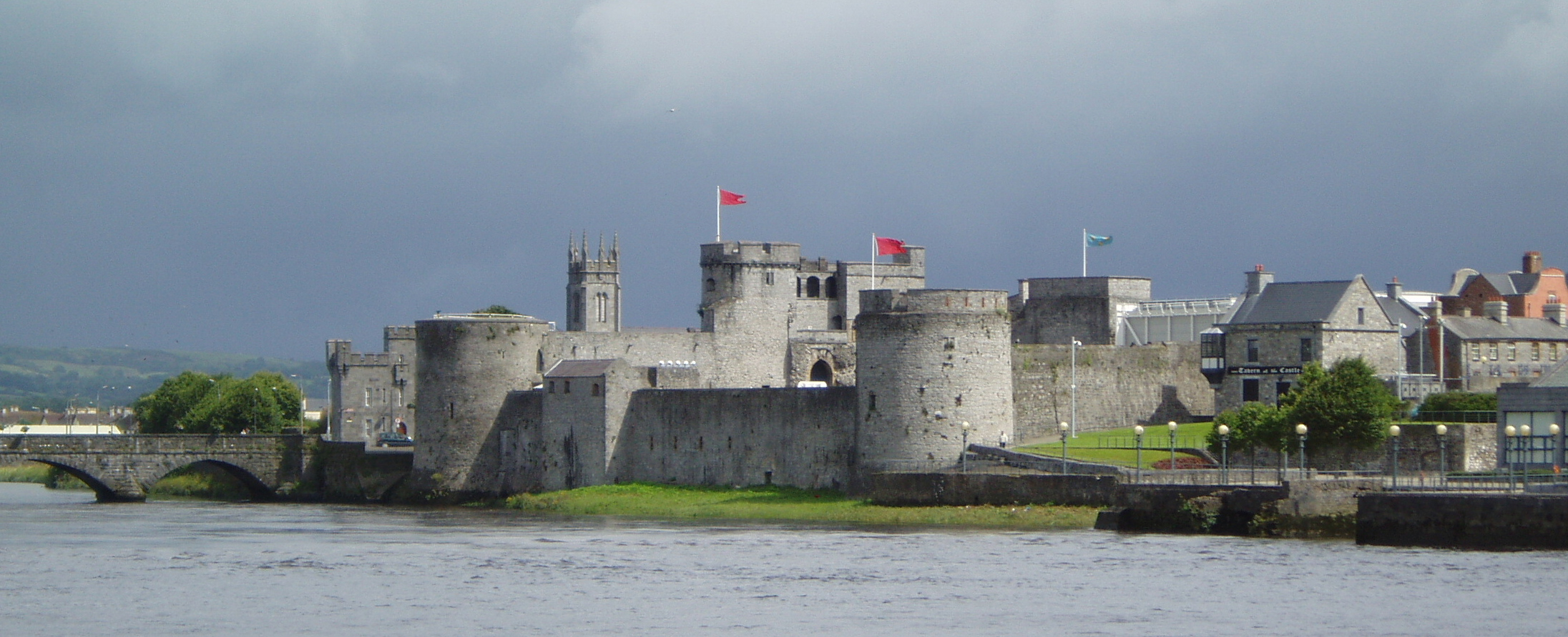
- King John's Castle on the River Shannon
Date	18 May – 23 June 1642 (1 month and 5 days)
Location	Limerick
Result	Irish Confederate victory

Belligerents
Irish Confederates	(Kingdom of England) England

Commanders and leaders
Garret Barry	George Courtenay

Strength
1,500 men	200 men

Ireland and St John's Castle

The city of Limerick was besieged five times during the 17th century. Two of these sieges took place during the Eleven Years' War. The first of these sieges occurred during the spring of 1642 when Irish Confederate troops besieged and took the town's citadel, King John's Castle from an English Protestant garrison.

== 1641 Rebellion ==
The Irish Confederacy’s taking of Limerick was made easier than subsequent attempts because they had the support of most of the city's population. About 600 English Protestant settlers had fled to the city to escape the Irish Rebellion of 1641 and had fortified themselves in King John's Castle in the centre of Limerick. They were led by Captain George Courtenay, 1st Baronet of Newcastle of Powderham in Devon. The city was predominantly Catholic and appealed to the new Confederate Catholic government at Kilkenny to capture this Protestant citadel.

== Confederate troops arrive ==
As a result, General Garret Barry, the commander of the Confederate Munster army, marched to Limerick with 1,500 men to secure it. As he had no siege artillery, Barry put his men to digging mines under the eastern curtain wall and the southeast bastion of the castle, which he intended to collapse by burning their supports. He also positioned snipers in the houses surrounding the castle to harass the defenders, particularly in St. Mary's Cathedral, which overlooked King John's Castle. Finally, he cut off the defenders' food and water supply.

== Surrender ==
After five weeks, when the English Protestants were ravaged by disease, they surrendered on terms, before Barry had to collapse his mines and assault the castle. The 400 surviving Protestants were evacuated to Dublin.
