= Garret Barry (soldier) =

Irish soldier (died 1646)

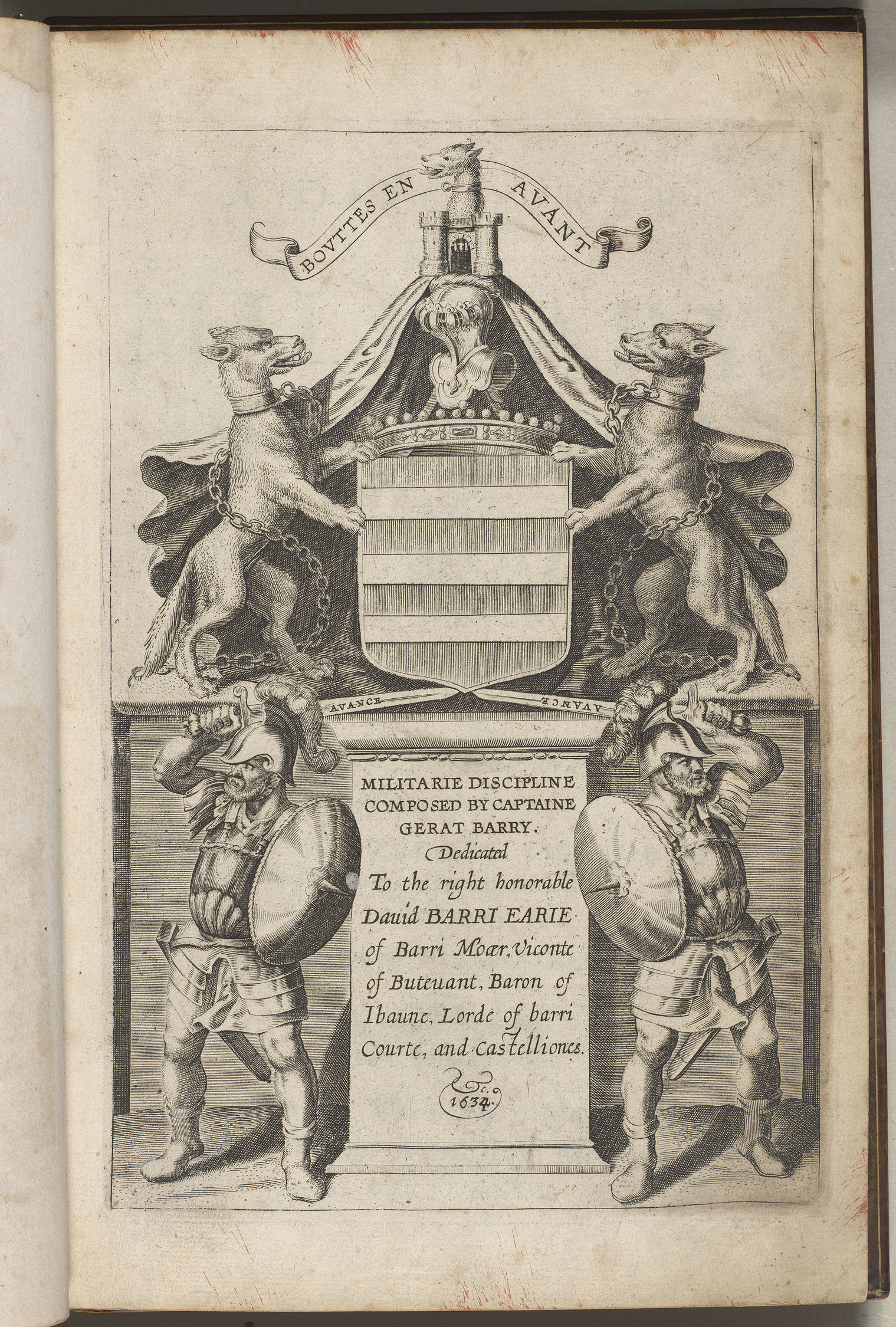
- Frontispiece of his book "A Discourse ..."
- Died: March 1646 Limerick
- Allegiance: Spain; Irish Confederation
- Rank: Captain in the Spanish service, General of the Confederate Munster army
- Conflicts: Eighty Years' War; Irish Confederate Wars

Garret Barry, also called Gerat (died 1646), was an Irish soldier and military writer, who fought for Spain in the Eighty Years' War and then for the Irish insurgents in the Rebellion and the Confederate Wars. When young he left Kinsale at its surrender in 1602 for Spain where he took service, first as marine in the Atlantic Fleet and then in the Army of Flanders. While in Spanish service, he fought at the Siege of Breda in 1624/1625. He retired with the rank of captain in 1632. Returning to Ireland he was at the Rebellion appointed general of the insurgents' Munster Army. He took Limerick in June 1642 but was defeated at Liscarroll by Inchiquin in September. He was confirmed as General of the Munster Army by the Irish Catholic Confederation but was in practice superseded by Castlehaven in 1643.

== Birth and origins ==
Garret was probably born near the end of the 16th century. and is probably the 'Garrot Barry', eldest of the four sons of 'David FitzGarret Barry', 'dwelling at Rincorran', who is mentioned in Pacata Hibernia in the context of the Siege of Kinsale, Munster, Ireland in 1602. Rincurran, also spelled Rincorran, is a locality near Kinsale. Rincurran Castle stood where Charles Fort, built in 1677, now stands. It was also called Barry Óg's Castle as it belonged to the Barry Óg (younger) branch of the de Barrys. Garret's father was a member of a cadet branch of the De Barrys, possibly the Barry Ogs. The de Barrys were a landed Old English family, seated in County Cork. During most of Barry's life, first David de Barry, 5th Viscount Buttevant and then David Barry, 1st Earl of Barrymore were heads of the family. Unlike Barry, both sided with the government.

== Siege of Kinsale ==
Tyrone's Rebellion, also called the Nine Years' War in Ireland was a theatre of the Anglo-Spanish War (1585–1604), the 4th Spanish Armada under Juan del Águila landed at Kinsale end September 1601 Old Style (O.S.). Águila garrisoned Rincurran Castle. Charles Blount, 8th Baron Mountjoy, Deputy of Ireland, rushed down to Munster and started the siege early in October. He took Rincurran Castle in November. After Tyrone's defeat at the battle of Kinsale in December and the surrender of Kinsale in February 1602, Barry, in company of his parents and three brothers, was allowed to leave Ireland together with the Spanish in March 1602.

== Spanish Service ==
Barry served for four years as a marine in the Spanish Atlantic Fleet in the Irish company of Hugh Mostyn. In June 1605 his unit was transferred to the Army of Flanders to bolster the offensive led by Ambrogio Spinola, against the United Provinces of the Netherlands. Barry landed at Dunkirk (part of the Spanish Netherlands at the time) in December 1605. His unit joined the newly created Irish Tercio, commanded by Henry O'Neill, a younger son of Hugh O'Neill, Earl of Tyrone. Barry fought as a soldier at the siege of Rheinberg in 1608. Some time between 1610 and 1621 Henry died and was succeeded as maestre de campo by Shane O'Neill, who was however too young and Owen Roe O'Neill was acting commander. Tyrone died in far away Rome and in the eyes of the Spanish Shane O'Neill, the eldest surviving son, succeeded as Conde de Tyrone. His tercio became Tyrone's Tercio.

Barry was promoted ensign in 1623. The tercio's maestre de campo, Henry O'Neill, died about 1626 and Owen Roe O'Neill succeeded in his post. Barry fought at the capture of Breda in 1624 and 1625. In 1628 he became captain in command of a company in Tyrone's Tercio. In 1632 he retired from active service.

In about 1639 he returned to Ireland to recruit for the Army of Flanders.

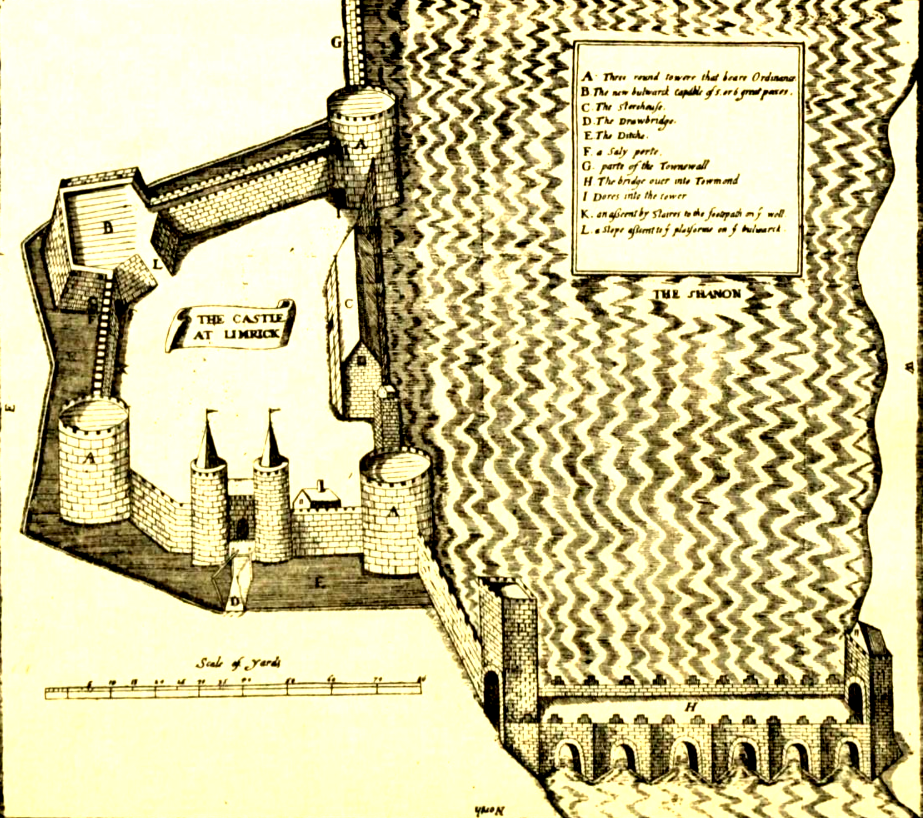
Limerick Castle captured by Barry in 1642

== General of the Munster Army ==
In October 1641 Phelim O'Neill launched the Irish Rebellion from the northern province of Ulster. When Barry visited Ireland in 1640 to recruit for the Spanish Army, his endeavour was interrupted by the arrival of the rebellion in Southern Ireland. Barry sided with his fellow Catholics.

In January 1642 Barry and Maurice Roche, 8th Viscount Fermoy besieged Richard Boyle, 1st Earl of Cork in Youghal. On 2 March 1642 Donough MacCarty, the 2nd Viscount Muskerry joined the rebellion (Note: Muskerry changed sides on Ash Wednesday 1642. Calculations with the Easter Calculator of the University of Utrecht or that of the IMCCE show that Ash Wednesday fell on 2 March in 1642.) To resolve the rivalry between Muskerry and Fermoy, Barry was chosen as General of the insurgents' Munster army.

In March 1642 Barry, Muskerry besieged William St Leger, the President of Munster, in Cork but were driven off by Murrough O'Brien, 6th Baron Inchiquin, on 13 April.

Barry then besieged King John's Castle in Limerick for the insurgents and took it through skillful use of the siege techniques he had learnt in Flanders—in particular undermining of the castle's walls (see Siege of Limerick 1642). The castle surrendered in June 1642. He then used the artillery captured at King John's Castle to capture other castles in County Limerick. He then tried to invade County Cork again but was driven off in disorder at the Battle of Liscarroll on 3 September 1642 by Inchiquin with a numerically much inferior force.

When the insurgents organised themselves as the Irish Catholic Confederates in October 1642, Barry was confirmed as commander of the Munster army by the general assembly.

In 1643 Barry prepared to besiege the town of Cappoquin in County Waterford, held by Inchiquin. When Ormond came south from Dublin and besieged New Ross in March 1643, Barry tried to relieve it with the Munster army, but Thomas Preston with the Leinster army got there first. Preston relieved the town but was beaten by Ormond at the Battle of New Ross on 18 March 1643. The war in southern Ireland was stopped by the Cessation signed on 15 September 1643.

Barry seems to have kept the position until his death in early March 1646 at Limerick but took little further part in the war.

Timeline
Age	Date	Event
0	1580, estimate	Born, probably at Rincurran, County Cork
20–21	1601, 23 Sep	The Spanish landed at Kinsale
21–22	1602, Mar	Left Ireland with his parents and his three brothers
22–23	1603, 24 Mar	Accession of King James I, succeeding Queen Elizabeth I
44–45	1625, 27 Mar	Accession of King Charles I, succeeding King James I
51–52	1632, 12 Jan	Thomas Wentworth, later Earl of Stafford, appointed Lord Deputy of Ireland
51–52	1632	Retired from active service for Spain
60–61	1641, 23 Oct	Outbreak of the Irish Rebellion
61–62	1642, 23 Jun	Captured Limerick Castle
62–63	1643, 15 Sep	Cessation (truce) between the Confederates and the government
62–63	1643, Nov	James Butler, 1st Marquess of Ormond appointed Lord Lieutenant of Ireland
64–65	1645, 21 Oct	Giovanni Battista Rinuccini, the papal nuncio, landed in Ireland.
65–66	1646, Mar	Died in Limerick

== Works ==
Barry wrote two published books:

- The Siege of Breda (Louvain: Henricus Hastenius, 1627) online at Google Books
- A Discourse of Military Discipline (Brussels: Widow of John Mommart, 1634) online at the University of Michigan

The Siege of Breda is essentially a translation into English of the Obsidio Bredana by Herman Hugo with some additions from Barry's own participation in this siege. Hugo's book had appeared in Latin in 1626.

The Discourse was meant as an introduction to the subject for young Irishmen envisaging to take Spanish service as infantry officers. It was dedicated to David Barry, 1st Earl of Barrymore: "To the Right Honorable David Barry, Earle of Barry-Moor, Viconte of Butevante, Baron of Ibaune, Lord of Barrycourte and Castelliones", who was the head of the Barrys, even if a Protestant.

== Notes and references ==
=== Sources ===
- Airy, Osmund (1886). "Butler, James, twelfth Earl and first Duke of Ormonde (1610–1688)". In Lee, Sidney (ed.). Dictionary of National Biography. Vol. VIII. New York: MacMillan and Co. pp. 52–60. OCLC 8544105.
- Armstrong, Robert (October 2009). McGuire, James; Quinn, James (eds.). "Barry, Garret (Gerat)". Dictionary of Irish Biography.
- Asch, Ronald G. (2004). "Wentworth, Thomas, first earl of Strafford (1593–1641)". In Matthew, Colin; Harrison, Brian (eds.). Oxford Dictionary of National Biography. Vol. 56. New York: Oxford University Press. pp. 142–157. ISBN 0-19-861408-X.
- Bagwell, Richard (1890). Ireland under the Tudors. Vol. III. London: Longmans, Green, and Co. OCLC 761857292. – 1579 to 1603
- Canny, Nicholas (2004). "O'Neill, Hugh [Aodh O'Neill], second earl of Tyrone (1583–1616)". In Matthew, Colin; Harrison, Brian (eds.). Oxford Dictionary of National Biography. Vol. 41. New York: Oxford University Press. pp. 837–845. ISBN 0-19-861391-1.
- Casway, Jerrold (1969). "Owen Roe O'Neill's Return to Ireland in 1642: The Diplomatic Background". Studia Hibernica (9): 48–64. doi:10.3828/sh.1969.9.2. JSTOR 20495923. S2CID 241936358.
- Coffey, Diarmid (1914). O'Neill and Ormond – A Chapter of Irish History. Dublin: Maunsel & Company. OCLC 906164979.
- Cokayne, George Edward (1895). Complete Peerage of England, Scotland, Ireland, Great Britain and the United Kingdom, Extant, Extinct, or Dormant. Vol. VI (1st ed.). London: George Bell and Sons. OCLC 1180818801. – N to R (for Ormond)
- Corish, Patrick J. (1976). "Chapter XI: The rising of 1641 and the Catholic Confederacy, 1641–5". In Moody, Theodore William; Martin, F. X.; Byrne, Francis John (eds.). A New History of Ireland. Vol. III. Oxford: Oxford University Press. pp. 289–316. ISBN 978-0-19-820242-4. – 1641 to 1645 (Preview)
- Dowen, Keith (2019). "Gerat Barry: Soldier, Military Theorist and the Irish Rebellion of 1641". In Jones, Serena (ed.). 'Britain turned Germany': the Thirty Years' War and Its Impact on the British Isles 1638-1660. Warwick, U.K.: Helion & Company. pp. 1–52. ISBN 978-1-9128666-2-5.
- Dunlop, Robert (1895a). "O'Neill, Hugh, third Baron of Dungannon and second Earl of Tyrone 1540?–1616". In Lee, Sidney (ed.). Dictionary of National Biography. Vol. XLII. New York: MacMillan and Co. pp. 188–196. OCLC 8544105.
- Dunlop, Robert (1895b). "O'Neill, Phelim 1604?–1653". In Lee, Sidney (ed.). Dictionary of National Biography. Vol. XLII. New York: MacMillan and Co. pp. 204–208. OCLC 8544105.
- Ekin, Des (2016). The Last Armada. New York: Pegasus Books. ISBN 978-1-60598-944-0.
- Fryde, Edmund Boleslaw; Greenway, D. E.; Porter, S.; Roy, I., eds. (1986). Handbook of British Chronology. Royal Historical Society Guides and Handbooks, No. 2 (3rd ed.). London: Offices of the Royal Historical Society. ISBN 0-86193-106-8. – (for timeline)
- Gilbert, John Thomas (1885). "Barry, Gerat or Gerald (fl. 1624–1642)". In Lee, Sidney (ed.). Dictionary of National Biography. Vol. III. New York: MacMillan and Co. pp. 319–320. OCLC 8544105.
- Hayes-McCoy, Gerard Anthony (1976). "Chapter IV: The Completion of the Tudor Conquest and the Advance of the Counterreformation". In Moody, Theodore William; Martin, F. X.; Byrne, Francis John (eds.). A New History of Ireland. Vol. III. Oxford: Oxford University Press. pp. 94–141. ISBN 978-0-19-820242-4. – 1534–1691
- Joyce, Patrick Weston (1903). A Concise History of Ireland from the Earliest Times to 1837 (12th ed.). Dublin: M. H. Gill & Son. OCLC 815623752.
- Lenihan, Maurice (1866). Limerick; its History and Antiquities. Dublin: Hodges, Smith, and Co. OCLC 1048327570.
- Lenihan, Pádraig (2004). "Barry, Gerat (d. 1646)". In Matthew, Henry Colin Gray; Harrison, Brian (eds.). Oxford Dictionary of National Biography. Vol. 4. New York: Oxford University Press. pp. 130–131. ISBN 0-19-861354-7.
- Lewis, Samuel (1840). A Topographical Dictionary of Ireland. Vol. II (2nd ed.). London: S. Lewis & Co. OCLC 1040258496. – G to Z
- McGrath, Brid (1997). "Donough Mc Carthy, (1594–1665) Cork County". A Biographical Dictionary of the Membership of the Irish House of Commons 1640 to 1641 (Ph.D.). Vol. 1. Dublin: Trinity College. pp. 203–204. hdl:2262/77206. – Parliaments & Biographies (PDF downloadable from given URL)
- M'Enery, M. J. (1904). "A Diary of the Siege of Limerick Castle, 1642". The Journal of the Royal Society of Antiquaries of Ireland. 5th. 34 (2): 163–187. JSTOR 25507363.
- Mesa, Eduardo de (2014). The Irish in the Spanish Armies in the Seventeenth Century. Woodbridge: The Boydell Press. ISBN 978-1-84383-951-4. – Preview
- Ó Siochrú, Micheál (October 2009). McGuire, James; Quinn, James (eds.). "MacCarthy, Donough". Dictionary of Irish Biography.
- Silke, John J. (1970). Kinsale: The Spanish Intervention in Ireland at the End of the Elizabethan Wars. Liverpool: Liverpool University Press. ISBN 9780853230908.
- Stafford, Thomas (1896) [1st pub. 1633]. O'Grady, Standish (ed.). Pacata Hibernia. Vol. II. London: Downey and Co. OCLC 4313009. – 1601 to 1602
- Thuillier, John R. (2014). Kinsale Harbour: A History. Dublin: Gill & MacMillan. ISBN 978-1-84889-848-6. – Preview
- Townshend, Dorothea (1904). "The Irish Attack on Youghal in 1642" (PDF). Journal of the Cork Historical and Archaeological Society. 10 (62): 100–102.
- Warner, Ferdinand (1768). History of the Rebellion and Civil-War in Ireland. Vol. I. Dublin: James William. OCLC 82770539. – 1641 to 1643
