= Thomas Carve =

Thomas Carve (1590 in County Tipperary, Ireland – c. 1672) was an Anglo-Irish historian. His correct name was Carew, that of a family of great influence in Munster during the fifteenth and sixteenth centuries.

== History ==
From his own works it is clear that the Butlers of Ormonde were his patrons during his early years. It is not certain where he was educated, but he was ordained priest, and passed some years in an Irish diocese.

On the invitation of Walter Butler, then Colonel of an Irish regiment serving in Austria, he left Ireland and remained for some time as chaplain to Butler's regiment. He returned to Ireland twice (1630, 1632), and on the death of Butler he acted as chaplain to Devereux, Butler's successor in the command of the Irish forces fighting under Ferdinand II. He accompanied the troops during several of the campaigns of the Thirty Years' War, and had thus a good opportunity of observing the events recorded in his history of the war. In 1640 he was appointed chaplain to the English, Scotch, and Irish forces in Austria, and continued to hold that position till 1643, when he went to reside at Vienna as a choral vicar of St. Stephen's Cathedral, Vienna. His last book was published in Sulzbach in 1672.

== Published works ==
(1) Itinerarium R. D. Thomae Carve Tipperariensis, Sacellani majoris in fortissima juxta et nobilissima legione strenuissimi Colonelli D. W. Devereux, etc. (Mainz, 1639–41, pts. I-II; Speyer, 1648, III; new ed., 1 vol., 1640–41). A new edition of the whole work was published in London in 1859. It gives a good account of the Thirty Years' War. In connection with the mysterious career of Wallenstein it is particularly valuable.

(2) Rerum Germanicarum ab anno 1617 ad annum 1641 gestarum Epitome (1641).

(3) Lyra seu Anacephalaeosis Hibernica, in qua de exordio, seu origine, nomine, moribus ritibusque Gentis Hibernicae succinte tractatur, cui quoque accessere Annales ejusdem Hiberniae necnon rerum gestarum per Europam 1148-1650 (Vienna, 1651; 2nd ed., Sulzbach, 1666).

(4) Enchiridion apologeticum Noribergae (1670).

(5) Responsio veridica ad illotum libellum cui nomen Anatomicum examen P. Antonii Bruodini, etc. (Sulzbach, 1672)
